= Harry Rogers Pratt =

American musical educator

Harry Rogers Pratt (January 17, 1884 – May 7, 1956) was a professor of music and drama at the University of Virginia from 1923 to 1954. Though he had no academic degree, he is credited with several accomplishments, including drawing the composer Randall Thompson to the university and founding the Virginia Players.

== Biography ==
Pratt was born in Boston and studied music at Harvard University before joining the University of Virginia faculty at the appointment of university president Edwin A. Alderman. He taught music and drama at Virginia and is credited with bringing Randall Thompson and Stephen Tuttle to join the music faculty as an associate professor.

Pratt, who directed the Virginia Glee Club from 1933 through 1943, was remembered as a director who had less polish than those who succeeded him, but who possessed great enthusiasm and who was responsible for bringing the Glee Club to national prominence through radio broadcasts and the group's first New York City performances. His work with the Virginia Players included a world premiere performance of Edgar Allan Poe's only play, Politian.
