= David Cornwall =

American musician

David Randolph Cornwall (May 18, 1937 – November 7, 2006) was an American composer and systems engineer. He wrote music for piano, horns, woodwinds and orchestra, composing more than 40 works in a span of less than five years leading up to the time of his death in November 2006.

== Biography ==
Cornwall was born in Denver, Colorado. Trained as a trombonist, Cornwall performed professionally with the New York City Opera and D'Oyly Carte Opera Company at the Central City Opera, where he performed in the world premiere of The Ballad of Baby Doe by Douglas Moore. After studying math and physics at Harvard College for one and a half years, he dropped out in 1957. Returning to Denver, he worked a systems engineer for United Airlines while performing for the Denver Philharmonic Orchestra (then known as the Denver Businessmen's Orchestra) and studying under its conductor, Antonia Brico. He was drafted by the US Army in 1961 and contributed to developing large systems for the Pentagon's National Military Command and Control Center, where he was named Chief Programmer for global nuclear war-game exercises.

After receiving an honorable discharge from the army, Cornwall returned to the airline industry, where he developed some of the first online systems for flight planning and real-time monitoring. Later in his career he received an MBA in economics from the University of Chicago.

== Composer career ==
Upon his retirement in 2001, Cornwall returned to music, this time as a composer. Over the next five years, he composed dozens of works at the University of Denver Lamont School of Music. Initially composing in neo-classical and neo-baroque styles, his compositions took a modern turn, reflecting the influences of Igor Stravinsky, Anton Webern, Witold Lutosławski and Arnold Schoenberg, among others. Cornwall's orchestral works have been performed by the Lamont Symphony Orchestra, including March of the Bride and Groom (2004), Parade of the Wedding Party (2005), The Grieving Maiden (2005), Triple Concerto for Piano, Violin and Cello: Birth of a Mountain River (2006) and Sonata for Violin and Piano (2006).

== Death ==
In late September 2006, several weeks after producing a draft of his final composition, Lullaby for Kayleigh, Cornwall developed severe sepsis following intestinal surgery. He died of complications from his illness on November 7, 2006 in Lone Tree, Colorado, a suburb of Denver. As part of his funeral the following week, his Fugue in Four Parts was performed on the pipe organ at the Cathedral of St. John in the Wilderness, Denver.

== Selected works ==
- A Wedding Suite (string quartet) (2003)
- After the Rain (piano) (2004)
- Buildings of Rome (horns, bass trombone, piano) (2004)
- Exercise in Brass (horns, bass trombone) (2004)
- Fugue in Four Parts (piano) (2004)
- Greenwich Village Voiticals (horns, bass trombone, timpani, soprano, piano) (2004)
- March of the Bride and Groom (orchestra) (2004)
- Oh, Christmas (chorus and alto recorder) (2004)
- The Puppet Dance (piano, later revised for quintet) (2004, 2005)
- Storm Over Budapest (horns, bass trombone, timpani, soprano, piano) (2004)
- Tender Moment (piano) (2004)
- Dance of the Veiled Lady (piano) (2005)
- The Grieving Maiden (chamber orchestra) (2005)
- Parade of the Wedding Party (orchestra) (2005)
- Yearning (quintet) (2005)
- Notes on Concerto (piano) (2005)
- Five Dances for Piano (piano) (2006)
- Triple Concerto for Piano, Violin and Cello: Birth of a Mountain River (orchestra) (2006)
- Sonata for Violin and Piano (orchestra) (2006)
- Lullaby for Kayleigh (piano and violin) (2006)
