= Colors of Love (Chanticleer album) =

Studio album by Chanticleer
- Released: 1999
- Genre: Choral

Chanticleer chronology
| Jerusalem: Matins for the Virgin of Guadalupe, 1764 (1998) | Colors of Love (1999) | Magnificat (2000) |

Colors of Love is a Grammy Award winning 1999 album of contemporary choral music by Chanticleer to a concept designed by Frank Albinder. The album won Grammy Award for Best Small Ensemble Performance at the 42nd Annual Grammy Awards.

== Track listing ==
- Cradle songs. Rouxinol do pico preto (Brazil) (4:22); Lulajze, jezuniu (Poland)(3:52); Buy baby ribbon (Tobago) (2:15) by Steven Stucky (10:14)
- Village wedding by John Tavener (9:39)
- Canti d'amor. Winds of May, that dance on the sea (1:13); O cool is the valley (1:08); This heart that flutters near my heart (2:17); Silently she's combing her long hair (1:28); Gentle lady, do not sing sad songs (2:27); Sleep now, O you unquiet heart (1:37); All day I hear the noise of waters (2:13) by Bernard Rands (12:32)
- Words of the sun by Zhou Long (4:43)
- Tang poems. Written on a rainy night (3:20); Wild grass (2:14) by Chen Yi (5:45)
- The rub of love by Augusta Read Thomas (2:33)
- In time of Steven Sametz (9:17)
- Love songs. Look out upon the stars, my love (1:22); Love is a beautiful dream (2:41); Alas, the love of women (2:43); For stony limits cannot hold love out (1:02); All mankind love a lover (0:58) Augusta Read Thomas (8:46)
