= Public domain film =

Film that is not protected by copyright

A public domain film is one that is not protected by copyright. A film can lack copyright protection for various reasons, but often it occurs following the end of a copyright term. Because copyright term varies by country, certain films might be public domain in one country but not another. For example, the film Metropolis entered the United States public domain in 2023, but under current EU copyright law, the film will remain under copyright in Germany and the rest of the European Union until the end of 2046, 70 years after Fritz Lang's death.

Due to the relatively shorter history of film compared to other artistic media the total number of films in the public domain is smaller. However, many films have become public domain because the copyright has expired, or they have been intentionally released by their creators.

== Public domain film by country ==
=== Australia ===
Australian law indicates movies become public domain 70 years after the year they were shown. If the film wasn't made public in the date it was made, it is the first year it was made public, plus 70 years.

=== India ===
Pursuant to the Indian Copyright Act of 1957, films in India are protected for a duration of 60 years from the date of their first publication.

=== Iran ===
Pursuant to the Act on Protection of Authors, Composers and Artists Rights of 1970, films in Iran are protected for a duration of 30 years from the date of their first publication.

=== Japan ===
In 2004, Japan extended its copyright protection of films from 50 years to 70 years. However, films released before 1971 remain under copyright until 38 years after the director dies.

In July 2006, following a lawsuit from Paramount Pictures, the Tokyo District Court ruled that films released before 1954 were in the Japanese public domain.

In 2008, following a lawsuit from Toho over the distribution of Akira Kurosawa's films, the Intellectual Property High Court ruled that films released before 1971 would have their copyrights restored if the director died less than 38 years ago.

=== Sudan ===
Pursuant to the Copyright and Neighboring Rights Protection Act, 1996, films in Sudan are protected for a duration of 25 years from the date of their first publication.

=== United States ===
In the United States, motion pictures published before 2002 are copyrighted for 95 years. All motion pictures made and exhibited before 1931 are indisputably in the public domain in the United States. This date will move forward one year, every year, meaning that films released in 1931 will enter the public domain on New Year's Day 2027, films from 1932 on New Year's Day 2028, and so on. All copyrightable works made by United States government employees as part of their official duties are in the public domain from their creation. The status of works made by contractors is dependent on the terms of their contract. State or local governments may or may not claim copyright over their works, depending on state laws.

Examples of films in the public domain in the United States

Night of the Living Dead entered the public domain immediately upon release due to having an improper copyright notice

Fear and Desire entered the public domain after its copyright was not renewed

Wings (1927 film), the first film to win the Academy Award for Best Picture, entered the public domain in 2023 following the end of its 95 year term

==== Re-imposing copyright following Uruguay Round ====
Another issue specifically affects copyright of foreign works in the United States. The Uruguay Round agreements on copyright led to the U.S. Congress re-imposing copyright on some items which had fallen into the public domain (in section 514 of the URAA Act), as of 1996.

In the course of changes made to both U.S. domestic law and international copyright agreements in the last two decades, some works which had fallen in the public domain had copyright restored in the U.S., and many others had new copyright protections placed on them for the first time. This was challenged on the grounds that works once in the public domain could not revert to copyright protection - a constitutional question. The see-saw course of court decisions on the matter has caused confusion, with many significant works (such as The Third Man) changing status several times in a short period.

Specifically, from a holding published on 3 April 2009 to a reversal on 21 June 2010, re-imposition of copyright was not permitted. That brief period came after the 2001 American case Golan v. Gonzales was reconsidered in Golan v. Holder, which held that the "limited time" language of the United States Constitution's Copyright Clause does not preclude the extension of copyright protections to works previously in the public domain.

Initially, Judge Babcock held that the First Amendment was not applicable to resurrecting foreign copyright claims. This holding followed tradition in that the First Amendment (which protects against suppression of free speech by government) has always been held not to prevail against the earlier copyright clause (copyrights are generally held by persons, not the U.S. government). Subsequently, Babcock reversed himself on advice by a higher court that such an act by an arm of government (Congress) changed the traditional interpretation of copyright and should be subject to First Amendment scrutiny. That reversal was itself reversed on appeal and summary judgement granted for the government. Babcock's holding - that "In the United States, that body of law includes the bedrock principle that works in the public domain remain in the public domain. Removing works from the public domain violated Plaintiffs’ vested First Amendment interests" - therefore no longer applies. In 2012, the United States Supreme Court decision in Golan upheld the ability of Congress to restore copyright to public domain works by international treaty.

Restored, subtitled, and dubbed versions of films can themselves be subject to copyright, even if other elements of the film are in the public domain. Thus even if a film dates from 1915 and as such is ineligible for copyright in the United States of America, a 2004 version with new visual or audio elements (including the addition of a new recording of the score of a silent film) may be itself eligible for a 2004 copyright to those new elements. Special features and packaging are themselves subject to copyright protection.

== See also ==
- List of films in the public domain in the United States
- List of countries' copyright length
- Public domain music
- Public Domain Day
