= Virginia Glee Club =

University of Virginia male chorus

- The Virginia Glee Club in 1893, including conductor Harrison Randolph and author of the Good Old Song E. A. Craighill. Courtesy, Special Collections, University of Virginia Library.

Background information
- Origin: Charlottesville, Virginia
- Genre: Classical
- Years active: 1871–1905, 1915–present
- Website: http://www.virginiagleeclub.org/

The Virginia Glee Club is a men's chorus based at the University of Virginia. It performs both traditional and contemporary vocal works typically in TTBB arrangements. Founded in 1871, the Glee Club is the university's oldest musical organization and one of the oldest all-male collegiate vocal ensembles in the United States. It is currently conducted by Frank Albinder.

== History ==
The Virginia Glee Club was founded in 1871 as the Cabell House Men. In the 1893–1894 session of the university, the Glee Club was combined with other extant student musical groups to form the Glee, Banjo, and Mandolin Club, a more permanent organization, with professor of mathematics (and University Chapel organist) Harrison Randolph as the director. During this period, the group toured major Southern cities annually, playing to standing room only crowds in Richmond and traveling as far afield as Atlanta, St. Louis. and Memphis, according to contemporary accounts, donating the profits to the Athletic Association of the University of Virginia. The group continued to perform and tour the South through the early 1900s; they are recorded as visiting Atlanta on tour under the direction of a student, John Shishmanian, in October 1905, and a contemporary letter attests to their existence in that fall 1905.

After the fall of 1905, the group disbanded and reformed periodically; University historian Philip Alexander Bruce indicates it disbanded in 1905, then reformed in 1910–1911 and began to perform again. The group went on hiatus for a year in the fall of 1912, citing "disadvantageous circumstances" with the hope of reforming later. It did reform in late 1913 or early 1914, based on a January 1914 photo of the group. Finally, in January 1915, it was reorganized under the leadership of Professor Alfred Lawrence (A.L.) Hall-Quest (professor of educational psychology); Hall-Quest is said to have modeled the group after the glee club of his alma mater, Princeton University.

Since 1915, the Virginia Glee Club has been in continuous existence as a men's chorus at the university. From the 1920s into the 1980s, the Glee Club enjoyed an association with the McIntire Department of Music through a series of directors who were members of the music faculty, including Arthur Fickenscher, Harry Rogers Pratt, Stephen Tuttle, Donald Macinnis, and Donald Loach. The group was viewed as an educational resource that enhanced other offerings; a course catalog from the 1920s offered students in the Composition class the opportunity to have their works performed by the Glee Club.

During the 1940s, the Glee Club worked with composer in residence Randall Thompson when director Stephen Tuttle commissioned Thompson to write The Testament of Freedom, a setting of Thomas Jefferson's words about liberty, for the Virginia Glee Club. In the later years of Tuttle's tenure, the Glee Club recorded an album with RCA of traditional university songs, accompanied by the University of Virginia Band.

In 1953, members of the Glee Club formed the Virginia Gentlemen, the oldest a cappella group at UVA, which originated as a performing subset of the Glee Club and became an independent organization in the 1980s.

The 1960s and 1970s found the group developing a specialty in Renaissance music under the direction of University professor Donald Loach, who developed a countertenor section within the group to meet the demands of the polyphonic style. At this time the group performed on national and international stages, including a performance at the State Department for the Washington Diplomatic Corps Banquet in 1968, the only college glee club to be so honored at the time. In 1971, the Z Society gave the Glee Club its Organization Award in recognition of its concerts and the recording of its album A Shadow's on the Sundial. The group toured Europe in 1972, funding the trip with individual and community contributions, as well as profits from their 1972 recording, A Shadow's on the Sundial.

In 1989, the Virginia Glee Club became a Contracted Independent Organization, with substantial assistance from Gilbert J. Sullivan and the UVA Alumni Association, when the Music Department moved unilaterally to combine it with the Virginia Women's Chorus into a mixed choir, which would have eliminated the Glee Club's independent identity.

In 2000, the Virginia Glee Club returned to the international stage with a two-week tour through France, making recordings that were released in the Club's Tour de France album. Funding for the trip camp from individual and community contributions, as well as profits from previous years' concerts.

=== Jeffersonian performances ===
The Glee Club has often provided musical accompaniment to public observances in honor of the founder of the University of Virginia, Thomas Jefferson, and his home, Monticello. They presented musical accompaniment to a visit to Monticello by the French Ambassador to the United States, Jules Jusserand, in 1904, and sang for the ceremony honoring the creation of the Thomas Jefferson Memorial Foundation in 1923. At one of the group's concerts in Washington, DC in 1912, the then-owner of Monticello, Jefferson Monroe Levy, was in attendance and was publicly baited for not turning Monticello over outright to the United States government.

The Glee Club was also active in the celebration of Jefferson's 200th and 250th birthdays in 1943 and 1993 with commissioned works and public performances (see Commissioned works for more details).

=== Notable alumni ===
Over the years the group has counted various famous UVA students among its alumni, including Woodrow Wilson, who joined the Glee Club while attending the University of Virginia School of Law, Harrison Randolph, who went on to serve as the president of the College of Charleston for nearly 50 years, Frank Hereford, who served as president of the university from 1974 to 1985, and Edward A. Craighill, author of The Good Old Song. Other notable alumni include Elbert Lee Trinkle, governor of Virginia from 1922 to 1926; Fulton Lewis, Jr., radio personality and author of the UVa fight song, "The Cavalier Song;" Ernest Mead, chair emeritus of the McIntire Department of Music at the University of Virginia; Charles S. Russell, justice on the Supreme Court of Virginia; John Entenza, architect and editor of Arts & Architecture Magazine; Frederick Nolting, ambassador to Vietnam; Prince Alexis Obolensky, socialite and the "father of modern backgammon"; Hollis B. Chenery, noted economist; James F. Jones, president of Trinity College (Connecticut); musicologist Charles Hamm, John Edgar Park, host of Make: television; Poulson C. Reed, Episcopal cleric and Bishop of Oklahoma; and Michael Butterman, Music Director of the Boulder Philharmonic Orchestra and the Shreveport Symphony Orchestra.

=== List of directors ===
In the early years of the Glee Club, the group's director was often a student. When Woodrow Wilson was a member in 1879, the director was John Duncan Emmet, who received his medical degree from the university in 1880. Similarly, in 1894, Harrison Randolph was a graduate student and instructor in mathematics, and Shishmanian in 1905 was a graduate student. From 1915 through 1989, the director was a member of the University faculty. Since the Club's separation from the music department, the post has been held by faculty, students, and outside professionals.

- John Duncan Emmet (late 1870s–1880)
- Harrison Randolph (ca. 1893–1895)
- John A. Shishmanian (ca. 1905)
- A.L. Hall-Quest (ca. 1915–1918)
- Arthur Fickenscher (ca. 1920–1933), head of the Music Department
- Harry Rogers Pratt (1933–1943)
- Stephen Tuttle (1942–1951)
- Donald MacInnis (1951–1957)
- David Davis (1957–1964)
- Donald Loach (1964 – Fall 1989)
- Scott DeVeaux (interim) (Spring 1989)
- Cheryl Brown-West (Fall 1989 – Spring 1990)
- Michael Butterman (Spring 1989 – Spring 1991)
- John R. Liepold (1991–1996)
- J. Craig Fennell (interim) (1996)
- Bruce Tammen (1996–2001)
- Burke Morton (interim) (2001–2002)
- Michael Slon (2002–2003)
- Frank Albinder (2003–present)

== The Glee Club today ==
Since its separation from the McIntire Department of Music in 1989, the Glee Club has existed as a Contracted Independent Organization at the university. The group currently receives no funds from the university, and is entirely student managed.

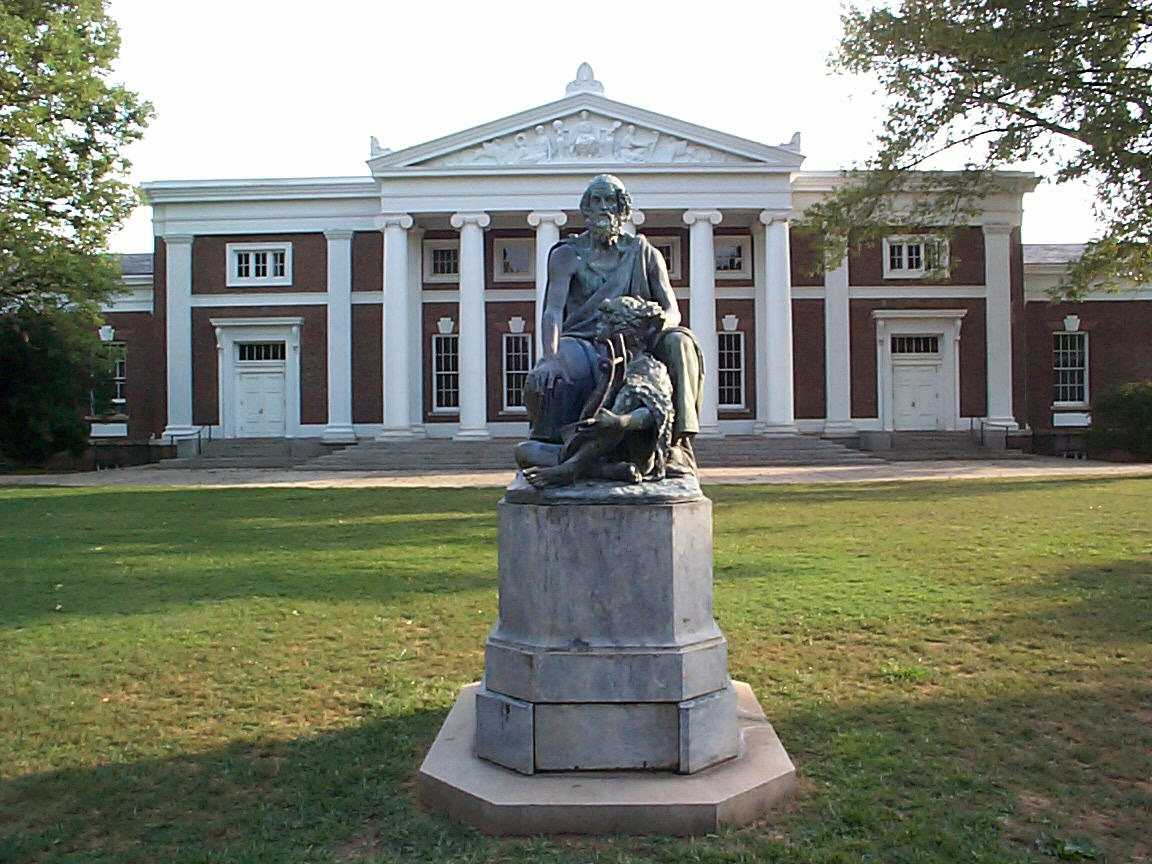
Old Cabell Hall, home of many of the Virginia Glee Club's Concerts

The Glee Club rehearses and performs the majority of its home concerts at Old Cabell Hall on the University of Virginia Lawn, where it recorded its 1947 record Songs of the University of Virginia. The Glee Club's concert schedule typically includes a mix of home and road concerts, mostly notably including its annual Christmas Concerts, which have been produced each year since 1940. The Glee Club also gives its Finals concert the night before University Commencement, during which graduating members are bid farewell. The Glee Club typically collaborates on the road with such women's choirs as the Wellesley College Choir.

The Glee Club was recognized in 2008 with a Jefferson Trust grant "to research, perform and record a collection of songs that reflect the historical significance of the University's choral music legacy," under a project called Songs of Virginia.

The Glee Club terms itself a "Fraternity of Talent". In its own words, the Glee Club is "committed to performing at a professional level, promoting fellowship, preserving longstanding tradition, and upholding the ideals of student self-governance." Members are said to adhere to the lifestyle set forth in the motto "Virginia's Messengers of Harmony, Love, and Brotherhood".

== Commissioned works ==
One of the high points of the group's early years was its 1943 premiere performance of The Testament of Freedom by American composer Randall Thompson, then a Virginia professor. The Glee Club commissioned Thompson to write the piece in honor of the 200th anniversary of the birth of University founder Thomas Jefferson.

The group continues to commission choral works for men's voices; recent examples include a men's voices version of James Erb's often performed version of "Shenandoah," and Young T.J., commissioned by the Glee Club from composer Neely Bruce in honor of Thomas Jefferson's 250th birthday. The latter piece was performed at various celebrations of Jefferson's 250th birthday on April 13, 1993, including a special performance for President Bill Clinton.

Other recent commissions include The Jabberwocky, a 2006 setting of the Lewis Carroll poem by Judith Shatin.

The Glee Club most recently was part of a group to commission a work by Lee Hoiby called Private First Class Jesse Givens. The lyrics are the text of the last letter sent home by PFC Givens before he died in Iraq in March, 2003.

== Discography ==
A list of currently available albums is available on the Glee Club web site.

- Songs of the University of Virginia (1947? 1951?) (RCA Victor 81952, LP)
- For unto us a Child is Born – Christmas 1967 (1967), Donald Loach, director
- A Shadow's On The Sundial (1972)
- 50th Annual Christmas Concert (1991) (cassette)
- 51st Annual Christmas Concert (1992) (cassette)
- Music for a Noble Acoustic (1994) (cassette)
- Notes from the Path (1996)
- Brothers, Sing On! (1998)
- Tour de France (2000)
- A Season with the Virginia Glee Club (2002)
- Virginia Glee Club Live! (2009)
- Songs of Virginia (2009)
- Christmas with the Virginia Glee Club (2009)
