= Durationator =

The Durationator is a copyright tool developed at Tulane Law School by Dr. Elizabeth Townsend Gard and her team of law students. The purpose of the tool is to determine the term, or duration, of copyright. It is now licensed to Limited Times, a social venture, to develop into a product. The Durationator takes research done at the law school and transforms it into code using what is designed to be an accessible tool, to determine the copyright status of a work.

The Durationator began as an idea in 2007, when Matt Miller, then a 2L law student with previous coding experience, applied to be a research assistant. Townsend Gard had been working on copyright, and in particular the copyright status of works. Legals terms can be complicated, and the idea was to blend the research and code. Initial estimates were for the project to be completed in the summer. Although both the initial "logic engine" for the Durationator code and a prototype of the legal framework were developed that summer, the process of researching worldwide laws and reducing those laws to a finite number of questions with discrete answers took ten years.

The research has focused on all of the elements that need to go into making a decision about the status of the work in whatever country is being searched. These elements can vary greatly. The team has also attempted to gather every law regarding copyright, creating a searchable database. The tool uses Logicnets as its platform, a logic tree search engine.

The Durationator has been indirectly cited by U.S. Justice Stephen Breyer in Golan v. Holder, referencing the complexity of copyright law and the need for code to sort it out.
