= Lawrence Golan =

American orchestral conductor and violinist

Lawrence Golan (born November 28, 1966) is an American orchestral conductor, composer, and violinist. He is the Helen N. Jewett Music Director & Conductor of the Yakima Symphony Orchestra in Washington state (2010–present), the Jody & Louis Appell, Jr. Music Director & Conductor of the York Symphony Orchestra in Pennsylvania (2014–present), and conductor of the Lamont Symphony Orchestra and Opera Theatre at the University of Denver’s Lamont School of Music (2001–present), where he is also director of orchestral studies and professor of conducting. In 2024, he was named the Official Conductor of the Concurso Internacional de Piano Compositores de España in Las Rozas de Madrid, Spain. Golan is also music director laureate of the Denver Philharmonic Orchestra, following an 11-year tenure as music director (2013–2024), during which he led the orchestra on international tours and established its annual International Conducting Workshop, Concert, and Competition. He has conducted orchestras in 28 U.S. states and 24 countries worldwide, including China, France, Germany, Italy, South Africa, South Korea, Spain and Taiwan.

== Life and career ==
Golan was born and raised in Chicago, Illinois, where his father, Joseph Golan (1930–2011), was for 49 years a member of, and for 35 years principal second violinist of, the Chicago Symphony Orchestra. He received his Bachelor of Music and Master of Music degrees from the Jacobs School of Music at Indiana University, and went on to complete his Doctorate in music in 1995 at the New England Conservatory with a dissertation entitled Performing Bach: dotted rhythms and trills in the sonatas and partitas for solo violin. He furthered his studies in conducting at several music festivals including Aspen and Tanglewood, where in 1999 he was awarded the Leonard Bernstein conducting fellowship. Previous positions that Golan held include principal second violinist of the Honolulu Symphony Orchestra, concertmaster of the Portland Symphony Orchestra, orchestra conductor and director of string studies at the University of Southern Maine, music director of the Portland Ballet Company, artistic director of the Atlantic Chamber Orchestra, music director of the Colorado Youth Symphony Orchestras, conductor of the Phoenix Youth Symphony, resident conductor of the Phoenix Symphony, principal conductor of the New Seoul Philharmonic Orchestra in South Korea and principal guest conductor of the Bayerische Philharmonie in Munich, Germany.

== Career ==
=== Early career as violinist ===
Golan began his professional career as a violinist, serving as principal second violin of the Honolulu Symphony (1989–1990) and concertmaster of the Portland Symphony Orchestra (1990–2001). He appeared as a soloist with the Chicago Symphony Orchestra, Memphis Symphony Orchestra, and Bayerische Philharmonie in Munich, Germany.

=== Transition to conducting ===
While serving as concertmaster in Portland, Golan shifted his professional focus toward conducting. His first music directorships were with the Southern Maine Symphony Orchestra, where he served from 1990 to 2001, and the Portland Ballet Company from 1997 to 2013. In 1998, he founded the Atlantic Chamber Orchestra in Portland, Maine, and served as its artistic director until 2003. Golan served as resident conductor of the Phoenix Symphony from 2006 to 2010, while also holding the position of music director of the Phoenix Youth Symphony from 2006 to 2009. Internationally, he served as principal conductor of the New Seoul Philharmonic Orchestra from 2013 to 2016, and later as principal guest conductor of the Bayerische Philharmonie from 2022 to 2024.

Golan has conducted for several international piano competitions, including the Scriabin International Piano Competition (Italy, 2005) and UNISA International Piano Competition (South Africa, 2020), and was named Official Conductor of the Concurso Internacional de Piano Compositores de España in 2024.

=== Teaching ===
Golan has taught conducting masterclasses and workshops globally, including at the University of Denver, Bard College, the Arapahoe Philharmonic Conducting Lab, the University of Colorado, and the Orquesta Filarmónica de Requena in Spain. Since 2020, he has led the Denver Philharmonic's annual International Conducting Workshop, Concert and Competition and, since 2025, the Conducting Workshop with Lawrence Golan at the Leonel Morales & Friends Music Festival in Granada, Spain.

Golan joined the University of Denver’s Lamont School of Music faculty in 2001 as director of orchestral studies and professor of conducting. Prior to this, he served as director of string studies at the University of Southern Maine (1990–2001).

=== Copyright Action ===
In 2011, Golan was the lead plaintiff of the United States Supreme Court case, now known as Golan v. Holder, which challenged the constitutionality of the application of Section 514 of the Uruguay Round Agreements Act. In the United States, the Act restored copyright status to foreign works (including musical compositions) previously in the public domain.

== Personal life ==
Lawrence Golan is married to Cecilia Golan and they have two children. His mother is Judith Golan and he has three siblings: Ari, Lara and David. In interviews, he has cited his father, Joseph Golan, as his most influential musical mentor.

== Awards ==
Golan's awards include:

- Global Music Awards for his recordings of Indian Summer: The Music of George Perlman, Beethoven 7 & Beethoven 7.1, and his composition Fantasia for Solo Violin.
- Down Beat Magazine Awards for Best College Symphony Orchestra (Lamont Symphony Orchestra)
- Prestige Music Awards for his recording of Tchaikovsky 6 and Tchaikovsky 6.1
- American Prize Awards in conducting and programming (2012, Grand Prize Winner)
- ASCAP Award, First Place – Collegiate Orchestras, Lamont Symphony Orchestra (2014)
- First Place, Ictus International Music Competition, Denver Philharmonic Orchestra (2017)
- Grand Prize Winner, St. Cecilia International Music Competition
- 2024: First Prize Winner in four categories, as both conductor and composer, St. Cecilia International Music Competition
- 2021: Distinguished Scholar Award, University of Denver
- 1999: University of Southern Maine, Outstanding Teacher and Scholar Award

== Recordings ==
- Pastoral Reflections, York Symphony Orchestra conducted by Lawrence Golan, 2026, Parma Recordings (upcoming)
- Mendelssohn 2 & Mendelssohn 2.1, Yakima Symphony Orchestra and Chorus conducted by Lawrence Golan, 2025, Albany Records
- From Canvas to Concert Hall: Music Inspired by Art, York Symphony Orchestra conducted by Lawrence Golan, 2024, Centaur Records
- Fantasia, Lawrence Golan, violin, 2021, Centaur Records
- Millennial Masters, Vol. 9, 2020, Ablaze Records
- Ode to Nature, Lamont Symphony Orchestra conducted by Lawrence Golan, 2018, Albany Records
- Beethoven 7 & Beethoven 7.1, Lamont Symphony Orchestra conducted by Lawrence Golan, 2011, Albany Records
- Tchaikovsky 6 & Tchaikovsky 6.1, Moravian Philharmonic conducted by Lawrence Golan, 2008, Albany Records
- Funky Little Crustaceans, William Hill, composer, Moravian Philharmonic, conducted by Lawrence Golan, 2007, Albany Records
- Visions, Dreams & Memories, works for Native American flute and orchestra featuring James Pellerite and the Moravian Philharmonic conducted by Lawrence Golan, 2006, Albany Records.
- Indian Summer: The Music of George Perlman, Lawrence Golan, violin; Martin Perry, piano, 1997, Albany Records
- Fantasia, Lawrence Golan, violin, 1995, Entrata Records.

== Publications ==
- Joseph, the Dream Reader (2026), Notation Central (upcoming)
- Score Study Passes: A professional conductor’s guide to preparing a musical score for performance (2025), Lambert Academic Publishing
- The Complete Lawrence Golan Violin Scale System (2024), Mel Bay Publications
- Giovanna d’Arco (Joan of Arc) (2023), Notation Central
- Fantasia for Orchestra (2020), Notation Central
- Bach: Three Sonatas and Three Partitas for Solo Violin (2006), Mel Bay Publications
- The Nutcracker, reduced orchestration (2003), Spurwink River Publishing
- Fantasia for Solo Violin (1997), LudwigMasters Publications
