= Antonia: A Portrait of the Woman =

1974 film

- DVD cover
- Directed by: Judy Collins; Jill Godmilow
- Produced by: Judy Collins
- Starring: Antonia Brico; Judy Collins
- Cinematography: Coulter Watt
- Edited by: Jill Godmilow
- Production company: Rocky Mountain Productions
- Distributed by: Phoenix Films
- Release date: 1974
- Running time: 58 minutes
- Country: United States
- Language: English

Antonia: A Portrait of the Woman is a 1974 documentary about symphony conductor Antonia Brico, including her struggle against gender bias in her profession. The film was directed by Judy Collins and Jill Godmilow. It was nominated for an Academy Award for Best Documentary Feature.

In 2003, the film was deemed "culturally, historically, or aesthetically significant" by the United States Library of Congress and selected for preservation in the National Film Registry.

== Cast ==
- Antonia Brico as Self
- Judy Collins as Self

== See also ==
- List of American films of 1974
- A Woman Is a Risky Bet: Six Orchestra Conductors, a 1987 documentary film
