= Karlos Moser =

Karlos Moser is Professor Emeritus at University of Wisconsin–Madison, and an independent music professional.

== Early life and education ==
Born in western Brazil of missionary parents, Karlos Moser received his musical training in Denver, Colorado under Antonia Brico. He received degrees in music composition from Princeton University in 1950 and University of Colorado in 1956. He served in the United States Army in Washington, D.C.

== Career ==
Moser trained with impresario Boris Goldovsky in conducting, directing and producing opera. He led Goldovsky's New England Opera tour of Rigoletto to forty-two cities.

Moser's academic career began at the University of Louisville in Kentucky, and continued at the University of Wisconsin. At UW–Madison as Professor of Music, Artistic Director and Conductor of The Opera, he produced and conducted over 70 operas from 1960 until his retirement in 1998, including the American premieres of Haydn's L'isola disabitata and Piccinni's La buona figliuola.

In addition to his work in the UW–Madison School of Music, Moser was founding conductor of the Fox Valley Symphony, director of the Wisconsin Youth Symphony Orchestra, and co-founder of the Original Hyperion Oriental Fox Trot Orchestra. He conducted ballet stars Rudolf Nureyev and Dame Margot Fonteyn, and music comedy stars Nancy Walker and Gypsy Rose Lee.

Moser produced a concert of labor songs that toured the state from 1990 to 1992 as complement to a traveling history exhibit of the National Museum of American History. In 2000 he produced and conducted the original opera Esperanza, inspired by and adapted from the screenplay for the 1954 film about the labor movement, Salt of the Earth. A Labor Arts Project of the Wisconsin Labor History Society and the Wisconsin State AFL–CIO, it was awarded the Governor's Award for Public Humanities Programming in 2001.

== Sources ==
- Karlos Moser personal records
- "Wisconsin Academy of Sciences Arts & Letters
- "Wisconsin Labor History Society, Musical Projects"
