= Donald Loach =

American music professor

Donald Loach is Associate Professor Emeritus of Music at the University of Virginia where he taught courses in music history and theory, and conducted numerous student choral ensembles including the University of Virginia Glee Club, University Singers, and Coro Virginia. In the Charlottesville community, he was for many years music director of the Charlottesville/Albemarle Oratorio Society now called the Oratorio Society of Virginia and of the senior choir of St. Paul's Memorial Church. In retirement he continued to teach general music courses, primarily for older students, through the UVa School of Continuing and Professional Studies and Osher Lifelong Learning Institute. His principal field of scholarship centers on the history of Renaissance Music.

Loach was born and raised in Denver and became a conducting student of Antonia Brico when he was 14 years old. After completing the BA degree in music studies at the University of Denver, he continued his studies of music theory and organ at the Yale School of Music, earning both a BMus and MMus. After a few years as assistant in instruction at Yale he returned to graduate studies at the University of California, Berkeley, where he received his Ph.D. in musicology. At Yale he studied under Paul Hindemith and managed Hindemith's Collegium Musicum. He also spent one year with Hindemith at the University of Zurich, Switzerland.

Loach joined the University of Virginia faculty in 1964. Loach was popular as a professor, noting in a 1972 Cavalier Daily interview that his classes were oversubscribed and that growth in the music department was inevitable. During his tenure as director of what was then known as the University of Virginia Glee Club he developed a choral section of countertenors, which enabled the ensemble to perform a wider repertory including masterpieces of Renaissance polyphony. These included masses by Josquin des Prez and Cipriano De Rore, Thomas Tallis's "Lamentation of Jeremiah," and many secular pieces. He led the Glee Club in participation in the inaugural Harvard Festival of Men's Choruses in 1977.

In addition to his work with the Virginia Glee Club, Loach also conducted the University Singers and founded Coro Virginia, a smaller mixed-voice ensemble, that he founded in 1989, the year he resigned as Virginia Glee Club conductor. Each December the University Singers produced a Renaissance Madrigal Dinner and Concert, and twice he prepared that ensemble for performances of Bach's St. Matthew Passion with conductor Otto-Werner Mueller. During his time as music director both the Virginia Glee Club and the University Singers embarked on numerous European tours, beginning with a Virginia Glee Club tour of Italy, Austria, Germany, and Switzerland in 1972. Tours to Russia (then the Soviet Union), England, Paris and northern France, Spain, Belgium and the Rhineland, and Italy followed. Often the concerts were performed jointly with choirs from the visited communities.

In addition to the choral ensembles at the University of Virginia, he served as music director of the Oratorio Society of Virginia and as organist/music director of St. Paul's Memorial Church in Charlottesville. In his retirement, Loach continued to lead the university community's annual Messiah sing-in until turning it over to current UVA Director of Choral Music Michael Slon in 2018.
