= Steven Sametz =

American conductor and composer

- Born: 1954 (age 71–72); Westport, Connecticut, US
- Occupations: Composer, Conductor and Professor
- Website: StevenSametz.com

Steven Sametz (born January 27, 1954) is an American conductor and composer. He has been hailed as "one of the most respected choral composers in America". Since 1979, he has been on the faculty of Lehigh University in Bethlehem, Pennsylvania, where he holds the Ronald J. Ulrich Chair in Music and is Director of Choral Activities and is founding director of the Lehigh University Choral Union. Since 1998, he has served as Artistic Director of the professional a cappella ensemble, The Princeton Singers. He is also the founding director of the Lehigh University Summer Choral Composers' Forum. In 2012, he was named Chair of the American Choral Directors Association Composition Advisory Committee.

== Early training, education and influences ==
Sametz's earliest piano works date from the age of six. During junior high and high school years in his native Westport, Connecticut, he began to write for choirs and chamber ensembles and undertook large-scale scoring of works for band and orchestra with encouragement of his teachers. Summer studies at the Amherst Music Center (Amherst, Maine) focused on piano, viola, voice, baritone horn and composition. He continued to compose during his undergraduate years at Yale University (BA, 1976), where his teachers included Robert Fountain (conducting) and Alejandro Planchart (early music). He spent his junior year at Yale abroad, studying conducting with Helmuth Rilling in Germany and composition with Sylvano Bussotti in Italy. He spent four summers at the Aspen Music School, studying choral and operatic conducting with Fiora Contino and voice with Jan DeGaetani. From 1976–79, he attended the University of Wisconsin-Madison, earning the Masters and Doctor of Music Arts degrees in Choral Conducting. His primary teachers included Robert Fountain (choral conducting), Catherine Comet (orchestral conducting), Carlos Moses (opera conducting) and Bruce Benward (music theory).

Largely self-taught as a composer, Sametz's style is influenced by Gregorian chant, Renaissance polyphony, French Impressionism, the works of Igor Stravinsky and world music. His early exposure to choral singing, beginning in fifth grade, gave him a predilection for singing lines and communication of expressive text through music. Beginning with some of his earliest works (e.g.: e.e, cummings' thy fingers make early flowers, (1972) for soprano solo and string quartet; Farewell (1972) setting Kahil Gibran's text for a cappella chorus) it is the expressive line of the text that guides the compositional process.

Spiritual practices and world travel have contributed to Sametz's style. Raised in a Jewish tradition, he was hired in 1976 as assistant choirmaster and associate organist at St. Paul's Episcopal Church in Norwalk, CT. He worked there much of his Yale undergraduate career, commuting from New Haven to Norwalk. At the same time he was being exposed Christian liturgy, he was beginning practice in Transcendental Meditation and would later study Vipassana and Zen meditation techniques. During his high school and college years, he traveled widely in Europe, studying composition briefly in Nice with Tony Aubin. During his graduate studies, he served on the musical staff of St. Paul's Church in Madison, Wisconsin, conducting a small choir devoted to performance of Gregorian chant reading from the Liber Usualis. Elements of Catholic liturgy and chant may be heard in several of Sametz's pieces: ¡O llama de amor viva! A Mystical Vision of St. John of the Cross (1987) is based largely on the Easter chant, Victimae Paschali laudes; Nevermore will the Wind (2002) and A Child's Requiem (2014) use the Gregorian Requiem chant.

In the 1980s and 1990s, he made three trips around the world, traveling widely in Southeast Asia, where he was influenced by the musical traditions of Japan, Thailand, and Indonesia, returning with an extensive collection of musical instruments. In many of his works there is a sense of timelessness common to Buddhist practice and Christian prayer. The combined influences of Gregorian chant, Renaissance polyphony, Impressionism and Asian music led to a style more based in timbre and overlapping melodic lines (at times aleatoric) than in harmonic motion.

== Composition ==
Sametz has received commissions from the National Endowment for the Arts, the Connecticut Council on the Arts, and the Santa Fe music festival, creating new works for Chanticleer, The Princeton Singers, the Dale Warland Singers, The Los Angeles Master Chorale, Philadelphia Singers, Pro Arte Chamber Choir, the Santa Fe Desert Chorale, Connecticut Choral Artists, Joyful Noise and the King of Thailand. In 2013, Sametz won the Raymond and Beverly Sackler Composition Prize, administered through the University of Connecticut. In fulfillment of the award, Sametz composed the oratorio, A Child's Requiem, in memory of the twenty-six victims slain at Sandy Hook Elementary School in 2012. The work received extensive national coverage through the CBS Evening News, NPR, ABC News, U.S. News & World Report, and Associated Press coverage. Scored for three soloists, children's chorus, child speakers, adult choir, and chamber orchestra, and based on writings by children combined with texts of Emerson, Dickinson, H.D. and Sametz, it asks the powerful question: How can we keep our children safe in a culture of violence?

In 2011, Sametz received one of the country's most prestigious choral commissions, the American Choral Directors Association's Raymond W. Brock Memorial Commission, to write Three Mystical Choruses for premiere by Chanticleer at the 2011 ACDA National Convention in Chicago. In 2009, Sametz's Music's Music, commissioned by the Los Angeles Master Chorale, was premiered at Disney Hall in Los Angeles. Dr. Sametz's compositions have been heard throughout the world at the Tanglewood, Ravinia, Salzburg, Schleswig-Holstein, and Santa Fe music festivals.

His works first came to prominence through his collaboration with the internationally acclaimed professional ensemble, Chanticleer. Sametz's setting of ¡O llama de amor viva! A Mystical Vision of St. John of the Cross was written for Chanticleer in 1987 and featured at the Chorus America convention in 1988. The cinematic approach of this fourteen-minute work — an opening villancico yielding to a portrait of the incarceration of San Juan de la Cruz, his torture, his vision, and a return to his cell, ending as it opened with the framingvillancico — gives a key to Sametz's defining style. Each work creates its own world. In 1996, he created a work for Lehigh University Choral Arts for large chorus, orchestra of tabla and tampuras with Indian dancers and a giant puppet of Vishnu that rose amid flashpots and smoke to portray the Indian story of The Demon King. His Dudaryku – A Village Scene (2001), written for Chanticleer and The Princeton Singers, is an extended double-choir work that poignantly portrays the loss of a musician and musical life in a small Ukrainian town. These worlds, often based on myths, legends, or folk tales from across the globe, reflect in deeply personal ways on universal themes of love, loss, joy, mortality, and a transcendence of earthly cares.

It was with his in time of (1997), a setting of e. e. cummings' poem, that Sametz's works came to international attention. Originally conceived as a large work for three orchestras and five choirs, it was later revised for the twelve singers of Chanticleer, in which form it was featured on their 1999 Grammy Award-winning CD, Colors of Love. There is a third scoring (recorded by The Princeton Singers and the composer) utilizing the original choral forces with chamber orchestra.

Sametz has delved into the rich field of medieval gay literature found in clerical letters and marginalia. His largest work to date, Carmina amoris (2001; revised 2010) is a choral symphony in six movements for large orchestra, choir, two soprano and tenor soloists, setting monastic love letters of Alcuin, Ausonius, and the anonymous clerical writings preserved in the Carmina Cantabrigiensia. This 60-minute work is published by E.C. Schirmer and recorded by Lehigh University Choral Arts under the direction of the composer. In 2011, the work was given at Carnegie Hall under the direction of the composer with Carmen Pelton, soprano and William Burden, tenor and the Lehigh University Choral Arts.

Reflecting the evolving history of gay civil liberties, Sametz's works speak to the struggle that has been inherent for the gay population for centuries. While Carmina amoris is his most ambitious setting of gay love texts, other compositions of his take up this theme: Dulcis amor, commissioned by the Harvard Glee Club (2004), sets a love poem of the ninth-century cleric Alcuin of York; We Two (2006–7), commissioned by the Minnesota-based male ensemble Cantus for a consortium of nine male choirs in the US and Canada, sets lines from Walt Whitman's ground-breaking Calamus cluster from Leaves of Grass. The 2009 setting of Whitman's We Two Boys Together Clinging for baritone and tenor duet with vibraphone and violoncello was later recast as the central movement of his Not an End of Loving (2010) for 12-voice chamber choir, which was premiered and recorded by Chanticleer. Both versions are published by E.C. Schirmer.

Sametz's earliest choral-orchestral works exhibit his fascination with a wide variety of orchestral coloration. His use of Burmese gongs (muji no makotoba—Scripture without words on a text by Hakuin Ekaku), hammer dulcimer, onde martenot and cimbalon (cent fois plus ombre... on a text by Robert Desnos) lead to later experimentation with Indian tampura and tablas in his The Demon King (1996) and Shamalyo (2007), (both in collaboration with the Indian singer/writer, Arati Shah-Yukich). This sound palette is further expanded by his more recent use of electronics, using digital delay on obbligato instruments with choir. His Fantasia on Jesu, meine Freude (2009),Voices of Broken Hearts (2010) and Fantasia on Call to Remembrance (2011) all stretch the boundaries of human singing into the realm of enhanced electronic vocal production. Use of electronic enhancement was foreshadowed in his The White Raven — ballet-concerto for piano, chorus and orchestra (2005) and the violin concerto of 2006, Be/dazzled. Sametz used digital delay on six core instruments in his setting of A Child's Requiem.

Sametz has created several ballets, from his early Arachne's Busy Shopping Day (1987) to his setting of a Tlingit creation myth, The White Raven-ballet-concerto for piano, chorus and orchestra (2005), to the more recent Small Steps/Tiny Revolutions (2008) written for the Rioult Dance company of New York, premiered at Lehigh University and subsequently staged in Florida, Ohio and State College, PA.

Sametz's compositions are published by E.C. Schirmer Publishing, Oxford University Press, Alliance Music, Walton Music, GIA, Steven Sametz Publications, and distributed by NoteNova Music Publications.

== Conducting ==
As Artistic Director of the Princeton Singers since 1998, Sametz has recorded four CDs and led the ensemble in repertoire from the medieval era to newly composed works. Repertoire includes Messiaen's Cinq rechants, Stephen Paulus's I Love (commissioned by the Princeton Singers) and works of DuFay, Ockeghem, Josquin, Milhaud, Mahler, Tavener and many works written for them by Sametz. In 2004, The Princeton Singers collaborated with Lehigh Choral Arts in a staged version of the Bach Matthäuspassion. The Princeton Singers has been featured at conferences of the American Choral Directors Association, American Organists Guild and Chorus America.

As the Director of Choral Activities at Lehigh University, Sametz directs the Lehigh University Choir, Choral Union and men's Glee Club in choral-orchestral repertoire from all eras. Many of Sametz's compositions have been premiered at Lehigh. Additionally, Lehigh University groups have performed on tour at New York's Avery Fisher Hall, Carnegie Hall, the Schubertsaal in Vienna, the Berlin Philharmonic, Beijing University, the St. Petersburg Philharmonic in Russia, and the Chiang Kai-shek Memorial Memorial Hall in Taipei.

While still a student of Catherine Comet in graduate school, Sametz won the Redlands (CA) Orchestral Competition. He regularly conducts orchestral repertoire as well as major works for chorus and orchestra. Guest conducting appearances include the Taipei Philharmonic Foundation, the Berkshire Music Festival, the New York Chamber Symphony, the Santa Fe Desert Chorale, CONCORA, Chanticleer and the Netherlands Radio Choir. At the Santa Fe Music Festival, he conducted his own works in a program entitled "Sametz conducts Sametz". He has conducted Chanticleer in the Monteverdi Vespers of 1610 in New York (in collaboration with Lehigh Choral Arts) and San Francisco.

== Works ==
=== Opera ===
- The Marriage of the Table and the Chair, text by Deborah Sacarakis. A children's opera set in the wild west. Soloist, chorus, small instrumental ensemble. 1982. (unpublished.)

=== Orchestral ===
- Arachne's Busy Shopping Day (Dance Movement for Orchestra) (2 flutes doubling piccolos, alto flute; 2 oboes – second doubles English horn; 2 clarinets – second doubles bass clarinet; 2 bassoons, 2 horns, 2 trumpets, trombone, harp, piano, percussion, strings.) 1987.
- Small Steps, Tiny Revolutions. Ballet commissioned for performance by the Pascal Rioult Dance Company. (Flute, soprano saxophone [triples English horn & oboe], clarinet, bassoon, horn, trumpet, piano, harp, synthesizer, percussion). 2007. Premiere Jan 26, 2008.

=== Concerti ===
- Bedazzled. Concerto for electric violin and orchestra (Fl., picc., oboe, 2 Bb clarinets, 2 Horns, 5 percussion, harp and strings) 2006.
- Earth, Wind, Fire. Concertino for two harps and orchestra. (2 flutes, 2d fl doubles picc); oboe, English horn; 2 clarinets, (2d doubles bass cl.); 2 bassoons (2d doubles contrabassoon), 2 horns, 2 trumpets, percussion, strings). Commissioned by Andrea Wittchen and The Lehigh Valley Chamber Orchestra. 2003. Revised and expanded 2010.
- Orison – A Child's Prayer Trumpet and Flute soli or other combinations of treble instruments, (e.g. two violins, violin and clarinet, etc.), strings and harp. 1999
- The White Raven – ballet concerto for piano, orchestra and chorus. (2 flutes, 2d fl doubles picc; oboe, English horn; 2 clarinets, 2 bassoons, 4 horns, 3 trumpets, 3 trombones, percussion, harp, strings)Premiered April, 2005. Eugene Albulescu, piano. Text based on Tlingit creation myth.

=== Band ===
- Home. (Based on Aka pygmy music). (3 flutes – flutes 1 and two double piccolos; oboe, 3 clarinets, bass clarinet, 2 bassoons, 3 saxophones, 2 trumpets, 4 horns, 3 trombones, baritone horn, tuba, percussion – 7 players). Commissioned by Paul Salerni for the Lehigh University Wind Ensemble. 1984.

=== Chorus and orchestra ===
- American Songs – Sacred and Profane. (Texts by Driscoll and Elliot) Baritone solo, large orchestra, chorus *
  - A Way of Talking to A Dog You Don't Know
  - Blood Love
  - At Being Buried, My Surprise (chorus only in number 3)
- Carmina amoris. (Medieval love songs). Choral Symphony in 6 movements. 2 Soprano soloists (one off-stage) and tenor solo, large orchestra and choir
- A Child's Requiem, (in memory of the twenty-six victims of the Sandy Hook Elementary School shooting) through the Raymond and Beverly Sacker Music Prize. For two choirs, three soloists, child speakers and chamber orchestra (2014–15). Premiered 2014.
- cent fois plus ombre... Text by Robert Desnos. (Cimbalon, hammer dulcimer, harp, electric piano, onde martenot, vibraphone, marimba, harpsichord, percussion, flute, alto flute, piccolo, 2 oboes, English horn, 2 bassoons, 3 horns and off-stage horn; off-stage women's chorus (SSAA) and organ.) Commissioned for the centennial celebration of Packer Memorial Church, Lehigh University. Premiered 1987.
- Colloque sentimental, text by Paul Verlaine. (Flute, oboe, clarinet, bassett horn, bass clarinet, harp, celeste, vibraphone, percussion, chorus, baritone solo, incidental SSAA soli, organ, strings, off-stage strings.) 1977.
- in time of. Text by e.e. cummings. (2 flutes, 2 clarinets, 2 bassoons, 2 horns, 2 trumpets, 3 trombones, harp, organ, SATB choir, SATB soli, 2 SSA children's choirs, divided string orchestras.) 1995. (Two other versions, see a cappella and works for chorus and small instrumental ensembles).
- muji no makotoba (Scripture without words). Text by Hakuin Ekaku. (4 flutes-doubling piccolo, alto, and bass flutes; B-flat clarinet doubling bass clarinet, C-trumpet, piano/synthesizer, celesta, harp, percussion, SATB chorus, soprano solo, strings.) Commissioned for the 250th anniversary celebration of the city of Bethlehem, PA. 1991.

=== Works for chorus and small instrumental ensembles or obbligato instruments ===
- Alleluia for two (or four) part choir, handbells, opt. harp. 2002 . Published by Oxford University Press.
- Alleluia-Amen SATB, organ, and brass. (optional harp and percussion)1993. Published by E.C. Schirmer.
- Angel Fire – A Christmas Anthem. Text by Peter Elliot. SATB, organ, handbells, 3 trumpets, optional harp and additional brass. Commissioned by the Cathedral Choral Society. Premiere at the National Cathedral in Washington, D.C., 2002
- Angelus. SATB and handbells (optional harp). Commissioned by The Princeton Singers. 2005.
- Bonse aba (All Children Sing!). Traditional Zambian text. SA and soli with percussion instruments. Commissioned by Joyful Noise, a special needs chorus. Premiered at the Chorus America national conference. 2009.
- Child of Song for SATB chorus, alto flute, clarinet, horn, percussion and harp. Published by EC Schirmer, 2009.
- The Choir Invisible for SATB chorus, organ, harp and percussion. Commissioned by the South Bend Chamber Choir. South Bend, Indiana. 2006.
- The Demon King. Traditional Sanskrit text. SATB, Indian ensemble, narrators, and puppet. With Arati Shah-Yukich. Premiered by Lehigh University Choral Arts, 1996.
- Desert Voices. (Seven movements.) Native American texts. SATB, soprano solo, and chamber ensemble (Flute doubles piccolo and alto flute, clarinet, cello, harp, piano, percussion.) Commissioned for the Santa Fe Desert Chorale. Premiere Santa Fe, NM, 1993.
- Dulcis amor. Text by Alcuin. TTBB with tenor and baritone solos. Optional harp. Optional orchestration with 2 cls, 2 bssns, 4 hns and harp. Commissioned by the Harvard Glee Club. 2004.
- Echoes. Text by Gerard Manley Hopkins. (Double choir, water glasses, amplified harp and percussion.) Commissioned as a National Endowment for the Arts composer consortium grant for the Philadelphia Singers, the Dale Warland Singers, and the Washington Chamber Singers with Chanticleer. 1988.
- Fantasia on "Call to Remembrance" for SATB choir and digitally delayed oboe. Commissioned for The Princeton Singeres, 2011.
- Fantasia on "Jesu, meine Freude" for SATB choir and digitally delayed Barique recorder or other treble instrument. (2009)
- in time of. Text by e.e. cummings. (2 flutes, 2 clarinets, 2 bassoons, 2 horns, 2 trumpets, 3 trombones, harp, organ, SATB choir, SATB soli, 2 SSA children's choirs, 4 violins, harp, and organ.) 1995. Oxford University Press, 2002.
- Laudare. Text by Constance Carrier. SATB (with opt. SATB off-stage choir), string quartet and piano. Commissioned by Connecticut Choral Artists. Premiere November, 1999.
- Litany (For a Year). Text by Susan Campbell. Commissioned by the Alaska Chamber Singers (Anchorage, Alaska) SATB chorus and violin (2015)
- The Maji. SATB and brass quintet. 1995. \\
- Music's Music. Text by Megan E. Freeman. (SATB-SATB choir, clarinet and harp). Premiere at Disney Hall, Los Angeles. February, 2009.
- No More War–A Letter for Sarah. Texts by Major Sullivan Ballou and General Philip Kearney (Civil War texts). Commissioned by The Princeton Singers. (Baritone solo, chorus and string quartet). 2012
- Nevermore will the wind. Text by H.D. (Hilda Doolittle). SAT-SATB; horn, percussion, harp. \\ Commissioned by The Princeton Singers. 2002
- Nunc Dimittis (He Gives Us Joy). Text from Song of Simeon (Luke 2:25–32) and lines from William Blake's Songs of Experience and Songs of Innocence. (Strings, harp, percussion, organ, SATB chorus, tenor and baritone solos.) Commissioned by the Bucks County Choral Society. 1997.
- Processional Sanctus. (Double choir, brass quintet, percussion, organ.) Premiered by Lehigh University Choral Arts, 1997.
- The Return. Text by Gordon Edwards. (Violin, oboe, violoncello, harp, piano, percussion, SA choir, soprano solo.) Commissioned by Pro Arte Singers, New Canaan, CT. 1997.
- Sanctus. (Double choir, SSA solos, 3 violins, cello, bass, organ, percussion.) Premiered by Lehigh University Choral Arts, 1997.
- The Twenty-ninth Bather. SSA, vc., marimba. Commissioned by The Princeton Singers (2009). See also a cappella version.
- Three Biblical Love Songs (with strings, harp, opt. dulcimer in No. 2). See also a cappella version of Nos. 1 and 3, below. 2012
  - David and Jonathan (TTBB)
  - Entreat Me Not To Go From You (SSAA); also for vln and harp/dulcimer
  - Rise Up, My Love (SATB). [No. 3 was commissioned by The Cheyenne Chamber Chorus]
- Voices of Broken Hearts. Text by Carl Sandburg. (SSAA and digitally delayed viola or vibraphone). Commissioned by Wellesley College. 2009.

=== Choir and organ/piano ===
- del nacimiento (Of the Birth). Text by Saint John of the Cross. Unison choir and harmonium (organ); optional harp and violin. 1987.
- I Cannot Dance, O Lord. SSA and organ. Text by Mechtild of Magdeburg. 2004.
- Kumulipo. Text on a Hawaiian creation myth. SATB or SATB-SA with organ. Commissioned for Punahao High School in honor of its alumnus, President Barack Obama. 2012
- The Light Within. SATB and keyboard or harp. Text by Peter Elliot based on 2 Corinthians 4: 7, 16–18. Commissioned by the Calvin Institute for Christian Worship, 2003. GIA Press, 2004 '
- Magnificat. SATB and organ. Premiered by Lehigh University Choir, 1996. Oxford University Press, 2000.
- Perhaps They Are Not Stars. Innuit text. Treble choir and piano. Commissioned by the Lower Macungie Middle School. 2002 . Published by Walton Music.
- Unless the Lord Build the House. SATB Choir, treble choir, treble soloist, handbells. Commissioned by the Princeton United Methodist Church, Princeton, New Jersey. 2000.
- You are a Letter from Christ. Text from Corinthians II 3: 2–3; additional text by the composer. Commissioned by The Texas Lutheran University Choir. Douglas Boyer, director. 2003 (also see a cappella version)

=== A cappella choir ===
- Amo! Text by Baudri of Bourgeuil. SATB. Commissioned by The Princeton Singers, 2004. (optional harp)
- Un bacio (A Kiss). Text by Giambattista Marino from La canzona dei baci (The Book of kisses). Commissioned by CONCORA (Connecticut Choral Artists). SATB. 2015.
- A Christmas Carol. SATB-SATB. Medieval text ("Gloire be to God"). Commissioned by The Princeton Singers. 2007.
- The Crocodile. Text by Lewis Carroll. TB. 1986.
- Dante's Dream. SSAA-SATB-TTBB. Text by Dante Alighieri from Il Paradiso. Commissioned by The Princeton Singers. 2013.
- David and Jonathan. TTBB. (See also Three Biblical Choruses, supra). 2012
- doth love exist? Text by D. Trout. TTBB. 2012.
- Dudaryku-- A Village Scene. Traditional Ukrainian Texts. Commissioned by The Princeton Singers for performance with Chanticleer. 2001
- Dulcis amor. Text by Alcuin. TTBB with tenor and baritone solos. 2004.
- Echo. Text by Christina Rossetti. Commissioned by Harmonia Chamber Singers (Buffalo, NY). 2015
- La Eternidad. SATB. Text by Sor Juana Ines de la Cruz. Commissioned by the Phoenix Bach Choir. 2004
- Everyone Sang. Text by Siegried Sassoon. SATB. Commissioned by the University of Illinois Choir.
- Five Sandburg Settings. Text by Carl Sandburg. Commissioned by the Pro Arte Chamber Singers and the Connecticut Council on the Arts. 1989.
  - Vaudeville Dancer
  - Baby Face
  - Joy
  - The Junk Man
  - Alone and Not Alone.
- Farewell. SSAATTBB Written for the Staples High School (Westport, CT) Orphenians, George Weigle, direcgtor. 1972
- Gabriel! A Tennessee Christmas Cantata. Text by Deborah Sakarakis. SATB. Soprano solo. Premiered Lehigh University Choir. 1987.
- God Over All. Text by Hildebert de Lavardin (12th c.). SATB. Commissioned by Hope Lutheran Church, Cherryville, PA. 2014
- I Have Had Singing. Text from Ronald Blythe. Published by Steven Sametz Publications (SSP001). 1992. Recorded by Chanticleer on I Have Had Singing (Chanticleer Records); re-issued on Teldec Out Of This World, and Reflections. Recorded by The Princeton Singers for Arsis (Steven Sametz, conducting).
- in time of. Text by e.e. cummings. SSAAATTBB –SATTB soli version written as part of National Endowment for the Arts composer grant for Chanticleer. Premiere April 1997. Oxford University Press, 2000. Recorded by The Princeton Singers (version for chamber orchestra) and Chanticleer (a cappella Love Letters (Litteras amore). Texts from Alcuin of York and Baudri of Borgueil. SATB-SATB. Commissioned by The Princeton Singers. 2015.
- Love Was Born Here in a Child. Text by Deborah Sacarakis. Christmas motet. SSAAATTTB. 1982.
- Mindful of You. Text by Edna St. Vincent Millay. SATB choir. Commissioned by The Cavalier Voices of JT Lambert Intermediate School, East Stroudsburg, PA. Premiere 209.
- Noel. TTBB. Published Alliance Music Publications (AMP-0089) 1995. Recorded by Chanticleer on Sing We Christmas. Teldec.
- Not an End of Loving. Commissioned for Chanticleer by the Lehigh University Choral Union to celebrate the 25^th^ anniversary season. 2009.
  - Where I Become you (text by Antjie Krog)
  - We Two Boys Together Clinging (text by Walt Whitman) (see also version for tenor, bass, vibraphone and violoncello. )
  - Not an End of Loving (text by Alcuin of York; translation Waddell)
- ¡O llama de amor viva! A Mystical Vision of Saint John of the Cross. Two versions: SATBB and ATBBB. Commissioned for Chanticleer. 1987. Recorded by Chanticleer on With a Poet's Eye. Teldec.
- O Magnum Mysterium. SSS soli, ATB-ATB. Commissioned by Chanticleer for inclusion on their national Christmas program tour, 2013
- On the Death of a Friend. Versions for TTBB, baritone solo, and SATB. Text by H.S. Holland. Commissioned for the Alamo City Men's Chorale, San Antonio, Texas.
- Pavane for the Nursery. Text by Jay Smith. SSAA. Commissioned by Texas Lutheran University. 2013
- Peace on Earth. SATB. Text by Edward Gordon. SATB. Commissioned by Staples HS, Westport, CT. 2000
- Rise Up, My Love. SATB. Commissioned by The Cheyenne Chamber Chorus. (See also Three Biblical Choruses, supra). 2012
- Seal. Text by Jeremy Driscoll. SATB choir, baritone solo. 1994
- The Twenty-ninth Bather. SSAA. Commissioned by The Princeton Singers, 2009. See also version with small instrumental accompaniment.
- Two Love Songs of St. John of the Cross. Text by St. John of the Cross. SSAA choir. Commissioned by The Princeton Singers. Premiered 2008
  - Luz y amor (Light and Love)
  - Mi amado (My Beloved)
- Two Medieval Lyrics Commissioned for Chanticleer. 1995.
  - There Is No Rose Of Such Virtue SATB, soprano solo.
  - Gaudete SATB
- Two poems of John Igo. SATB. (#2 with harp.) 1985.
  - Will I Love You?
  - I Was Drowning in Grass.
- Thou Whose Birth. SATB (optional harp). Text from the Christmas Antiphons of C.A. Swinburne. Commissioned by the Choral Society of Durham. 2007
- Three Mystical Choruses American Choral Directors Association Raymond W. Brock commission, 2011 Published by E.C. Schirmer, 2011
  - Nino de Rosas (Child of Roses) SATB. SATB mezzo-soprano solo. Text by Jacinto de Evia. ECS 7711
  - En Kelohenu (There Is None Like Our God) Text from the Saturday morning Shabbat service. SATB-SATB, SA/SSAA, or TB/TTBB
  - Mẽ to tere paas me (I Am Within You) Text by Kabir SAB/SATB
- When He Shall Die. Text from Shakespeare. SATB. Commissioned by Central Bucks-West High School. (In memoriam Louis Botto.) Oxford University Press, 1999.
- When Morning Comes. Text by Kendall Harrison (WWI). TTBB. Commissioned by The Princeton Singers. 2011
- y berenjenes con queso ("and eggplants with cheese") Renaissance Spanish text. SATB. 1995.
- You are a Letter from Christ. Text from Corinthians II 3: 2–3; additional text by the composer. Commissioned by The Texas Lutheran University Choir. Douglas Boyer, director. 2003 (also version for choir and keyboard)
- You Stepped Out of Heaven. SATB. 1990.

=== Solo Songs ===
- A Way of Talking to a Dog You Don't Know. Text by Jeremy Driscoll. Baritone (mezzo) and piano. 1994.
- del nacimiento (Of the Birth). Text by Saint John of the Cross. High voice and harmonium (organ); optional harp and violin. 1987.
- Desert Voices. Native American texts. Solo version for high voice with instrumental ensemble (Flute, clarinet, cello, perc.) 1993.
- Eleven poems from the Japanese. High voice and piano. 1990.
- I Cannot Dance, O Lord. Soprano/tenor and organ. Text by Mechtild of Magdeburg. 2004
- Maybe. Text by Carl Sandburg. High voice and piano. 1989.
- One Voice. Text by Joseph Weiss. Medium voice and piano. 1996.
- The Poet's Mind. High voice. 1978. With piano and horn.
- Prayers of Steel. Text by Carl Sandburg. In memoriam Jan DeGaetani. Two versions: high or low voice with piano. 1989.
- Restlessness. Text by Sametz. High voice. 1978.
- The River Merchant's Wife: A Letter. Text by Ezra Pound. For soprano or mezzo-soprano and piano. Orchestrated 2016.
- Three Poems of Langston Hughes. For soprano and violin. 1996.
  - The Dream Keeper
  - Poem
  - Joy
- Two songs for Lent. Counter-tenor and viola. 1973.
  - Cor mundum crea in me (Create in Me Lord a Clean Heart)
  - Averte faciem tuam (Avert Your Face)
- Voices of Broken Hearts. SSA choir and digitally delayed vibraphone. Commissioned by the Wellesley College Choir. Premiered at the American Choral Director's Association convention, February 13, 2009. Published by E.C. Schirmer.
- We Two Boys Together Clinging. Tenor-Baritone duet, marimba/vibes, violoncello.
- y berenjenas con queso (and eggplant with cheese). Soprano, violin, and piano. Renaissance Spanish text.

=== Chamber music ===
- Introduction and Tango. For 6 strings. 1985.
- Panoply. For flute, 2 synthesizers, and electric bass. 1996.
- Pericolo. For woodwind quintet

=== Arrangements ===
- All Through the Night. SATB-SATB. 2015
- Calvary. Tenor solo and choir. Published by Walton Music, 2007.
- Dance of the Hours (Ponchielli). SATB. 2012.
- Evening Prayer (from Hänsel and Gretel) SATB. 2014
- The Guiding Light. SATB with Orchestra. Commissioned for the 6th Cycle Birthday celebration for the King of Thailand. November, 1999
- Here We Come A-Wassailing. SATB. 2013.
- The Heroine Triumphant. Medley of 1890s Melodies. SATB. Oxford University Press, February, 2000
- Irish Lullaby for the Christ Child. Gaelic poem. SSAA, soprano solo, optional harp. 1995. Published Alliance Music Publications (AMP-0088) 1995
- Kas Tie Tadi. Latvian folk song. SATB. Alliance Music Publications (AMP-0087) 1995.
- Kein Feuer, Keine Kohle kann brennen so heiss. German Folksong. SATB Oxford University Press, 1999
- The Last Rose of Summer. SATB with tenor solo. 2015
- Lo How A Rose E'er Blooming (various versions composed for Lehigh University Choral Arts, 1979– ). The version based on Albert Becker's Weihnachtsmotette is published by ECS.
- Ne sedi, Djemo (Bosnian Folksong) Oxford University Press, 2002
- Ngam Sang Duan (Shining Moon). Thai folk song. SATB. Oxford University Press, 2000
- O Holy Night. SATB, A Solo, organ (harp opt.). 2014
- Pai duli. Russian Folksong. SATB. Oxford University Press. February, 2000
- Los Pastores. Chicano Christmas songs. SATB. Published by Oxford University Press, 2002
- La Villanella. Italian Folksong. SATB. Oxford University Press, 1999
- Shall We Gather at the River. SATB with bass solo. 2016
- Shenandoah. American Folksong. SSAATTBB. Oxford University Press, 2002
- Silent Night. Franz Grueber. SSATTB. 2005
- Wondrous Love. Southern American folk song. SSAB (may be used for congregational singing), handbells, optional harp. Oxford University Press, 2000
