= Jill Godmilow =

American filmmaker (1943–2025)

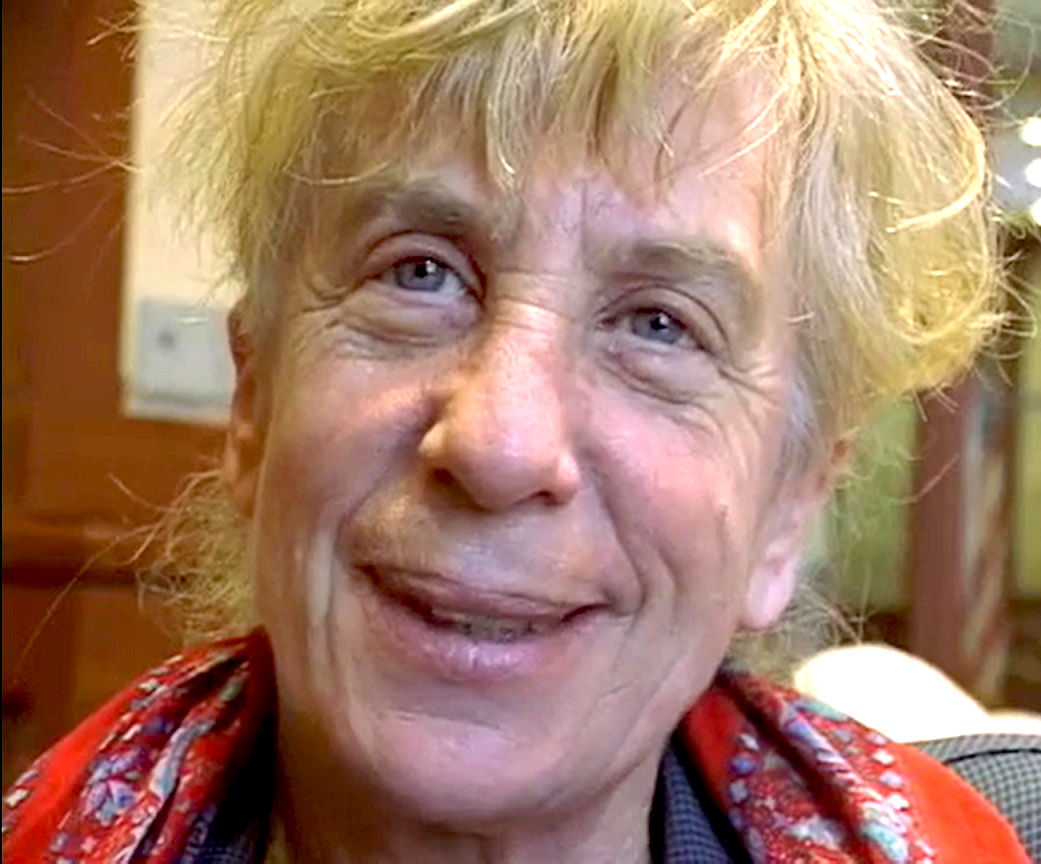
- Born: November 23, 1943; Philadelphia, Pennsylvania, U.S.
- Died: September 15, 2025 (aged 81)
- Occupation: Filmmaker
- Known for: Antonia: A Portrait of the Woman, Far From Poland, Roy Cohn/Jack Smith, What Farocki Taught, Kill the Documentary

Jill Godmilow (born Joan Godmilow; November 23, 1943 – September 15, 2025) was an American independent filmmaker, primarily of non-fiction works, and an advocate for Post-Realism in documentary. She was an emeritus professor in the department of film, television, and theatre at the University of Notre Dame. Godmilow was a recipient of a Guggenheim Fellowship.

== Background ==
Born Joan Godmilow near Philadelphia, the younger daughter of Herbert and Beatrice (Schlaifman) Godmilow, she studied Russian literature at the University of Wisconsin–Madison, graduating in 1965. She was Jewish, and she said "I lost my family in the Holocaust".

== Career ==
Godmilow's 1974 film with collaborator Judy Collins, Antonia: A Portrait of the Woman, was about female conductor Antonia Brico. It received a nomination for Academy Award for Best Documentary Feature, and in 2003 the film was selected for the National Film Registry of the Library of Congress. In 1984, she made Far From Poland, a non-fiction feature about contradictions in the Polish Solidarity movement, filmed entirely in the U.S. It was heralded for breaking new ground in the documentary genre.

Her 1987 feature film, Waiting for the Moon, is a biography of Gertrude Stein and Alice B. Toklas, played by actresses Linda Hunt and Linda Bassett. It was produced for PBS's American Playhouse series, released theatrically by Skouras Pictures, and won Best Feature Film at the Sundance Film Festival in 1987. In 1998, her short film What Farocki Taught premiered at the International Film Festival Rotterdam. The film is a replica, in color and in English, of Harun Farocki's 1969 black and white German language film Inextinguishable Fire, on the production of napalm at Dow Chemical Company. Her film was featured in the 2000 Whitney Biennial.

In 2022, she published the book Kill the Documentary: A Letter to Filmmakers, Students, and Scholars, through Columbia University Press, which film theorist Bill Nichols prefers to call "a manifesto" for Post-Realism in documentary.

== Death ==
Godmilow died on September 15, 2025, at the age of 81.

== See also ==
- List of female film and television directors
- List of LGBT-related films directed by women
