= Jackson Hill (composer) =

American composer

Jackson Hill

Jackson Hill (born 1941 in Birmingham, Alabama), is an American composer primarily of symphonic, ensemble, and vocal music.

== Biography ==
Hill was a Morehead Scholar at the University of North Carolina at Chapel Hill (Ph.D. in musicology in 1970). A composer from the age of 14, he studied composition with Iain Hamilton at Duke University (1964–66) and Roger Hannay (1967-68). He has served as a visiting scholar and choral assistant at Exeter College, Oxford, and as a visiting fellow at Clare Hall, Cambridge University. He studied Buddhist chant as a Fulbright Fellow in Japan in the 1970s, and traditional Japanese music has been a strong influence in his work.

He has received numerous awards and prizes for his music, which includes choral, solo, and chamber music, as well as a chamber opera and three symphonies. Hill’s music has been widely performed in Europe, Asia and the Americas, including performances at the Tanglewood, Ravinia, Chautauqua, and Edinburgh festivals. Recent commissions have come from The Fitzwilliam String Quartet (UK), Lichfield Cathedral, Chanticleer, the King's Singers, New York Polyphony, and the Three Choirs Festival (UK). His composition Voices of Autumn was part of Chanticleer’s Grammy nomination in 2003. He taught at Duke University (1966-1968) and 1968-2008 at Bucknell University, where he served as Associate Dean, Presidential Professor, and Chair of the Department of Music.

== Compositions ==
Hill is internationally known for his contribution to the vocal idiom. Principal works include:

=== Music for orchestra ===
- Variations for Orchestra (1964)
- Mosaics (1965)
- Paganini Set (1973)
- Ceremonies of Spheres (1973)
- Sangraal (1977)
- Chambers (1988)
- Toccata Nipponica (1989)
- Secrets (Himitsu) (1990)
- Symphony No. 1 (Sinfonia Nipponica) (1990)
- Symphony No. 2 (Sinfonia Canonica) (1996)
- Symphony No. 3 (Sinfonia Romantica) (1997)

=== Ensemble music ===
- Serenade (1970) flute / violin / cello / piano
- Remembered Landscape (1984) violin / viola / cello / piano
- Tholos (1991) flute / oboe / clar / violin / cello / piano / percussion
- Trio da Camera (1993) flute / oboe / cello
- Threnody (2005) horn / string quartet
- Ghosts (2010) string quartet

=== Music for solo voice ===
- Love Parting (1987) song cycle for voice / piano
- The Streams of Love (1989) voice / viola / piano
- Long hidden deep in winter's keeping (2001) voice / string quartet
- Philomel (2002) voice / recorder / cello / harp
- El Duelo ("The Mourning") (2010) tenor / string quartet
- The Silent Ground (2010) voice / piano

=== Church music with English text ===
- By Water and the Word (1995) SATB / org
- The Gifts of the Spirit (1996) SATB / org
- Praise, O Praise the Lord (1997) SATB / org
- A Song of Pilgrimage (1997) SATB
- How Shall the Young (2000) SATB / org
- The St. Chad Magnificat and Nunc dimittis (Lichfield Service) (2003)
- Where Cross the Crowded Ways of Life (2010) SATB / org

=== Church music with Latin text ===
- O Salutaris (1973)
- Tantum Ergo (1974) Peters Edition
- Missa Brevis (1974) SATB, Peters Edition
- Three Motets (1977) SATB Peters edition
- Hodie Christus Natus Est (1982) SATB
- Sacris sollemniis (1992) SATB
- Populus Sion, ecce Dominus (1994) SATB

=== Choral concert music ===
- Voices of Autumn (1982) SATB
- O Light Invisible (1994) SATB
- In Winter's Keeping (2001)
- Remembered Love (2004) AATBBB
- When spring is born at last (2004) SATB
- Summer Dreams (2006) SSAATTBB
- A Haunted Melancholy (2008) SSAATBB
- Ma fin est mon commencement (2009) ATBB
- Still, in Remembrance (Elegy for 9/11) (2011) SSAATTBB
- To Hold the Light (2013) SSAATTBB
- No Traveler More Blest (2014) SATB
- Wings of Thy Dark Soul (2014) SATB

== See also ==
- Composer's homepage
- Sounds Choral Interview aired on WWFM 29 April 2018
- ArtScene Interview aired on WVIA 4 September 2019
