= Frostiana =

Musical piece

Frostiana: Seven Country Songs is a piece for mixed chorus and piano composed in 1959 by Randall Thompson. It premiered on October 18, 1959, in Amherst, Massachusetts. Thompson later scored the piece for chamber orchestra and chorus; this version was first performed on April 23, 1965.

Thompson was commissioned by the town of Amherst to write a piece commemorating its bicentennial in 1959. The town was known for its association with Robert Frost, who had lived there for some years. Frost had known Thompson for some time, and admired his music; accordingly, it was decided that the commemorative work would be a setting of some of Frost's poetry. The town suggested "The Gift Outright"; Thompson, however, feared that the text was inappropriate for the occasion, and asked to be allowed to choose his own texts. In the end, the composer selected seven poems, with which he constructed a seven-movement suite of choral art songs:

- "The Road Not Taken"
- "The Pasture"
- "Come In"
- "The Telephone"
- "A Girl's Garden"
- "Stopping by Woods on a Snowy Evening"
- "Choose Something Like a Star"

As the male and female choruses rehearsed separately, Thompson structured the work so that they sang together only in three of the seven movements; each of the other four was scored for either male voices or female voices alone.

A number of recordings of Frostiana exist, and it is still performed with some frequency.
