= Daniel V. Thompson =

Daniel Varney Thompson (1902–1980) was an American art historian and translator.

He taught at Harvard University and Courtald Institute, London, travelled to India and China to study cave paintings.

Thompson is best known for the definitive English translation of Cennino D'Andrea Cennini's Il libro dell'arte (The Craftsman's Handbook). He worked from the original Italian sources, along with earlier translations. Key to his translation work was replicating much of Cennini's craft instructions himself and with his students. Thompson was the brother of noted American composer Randall Thompson.

== Publications ==
Thompson's overview of his subject is his The Materials and Techniques of Medieval Painting (reprint Dover, 1956). For a bibliography of 18 publications by Thompson on the subject of medieval and renaissance artists' recipe books see Clarke, M The Art of All Colours London: Archetype, 2001 pp. 148–9.
