= Jan Gilbert =

American classical composer

Jan Gilbert (born August 6, 1946) is an American composer, cellist, and professor of music.

== Life and career ==
Janet Monteith Gilbert was born in New York City, NY. She studied cello at the Naples Conservatory and was granted her bachelor of arts in music in 1969 from Douglass College. In 1972 she received a Master of Arts in composition from Villa Schifolianoia in Florence, Italy. Studying under Salvatore Martirano and Ben Johnston, she received her Doctorate of Musical Arts from the University of Illinois in 1979, where she specialized in electronic music. Other teachers include Piergtro Grossi, Charles Dodge and John Melby. She has taught at Middlebury College, St. Olaf College, University of Maine, and Macalester College.

== Music ==
Gilbert's works include electronic music, verbal improvisation, sacred vocal music, experimental hip-hop, chamber music and multimedia pieces with tape, theatre and dance collaboration. She has been commissioned by varying groups such as Chanticleer, the St Paul Civic Orchestra and the Dale Warland Singers. She draws material from many different cultures, including traditional stories of the Hmong People, legends from the Pacific Northwest Tlingit tribe, and classical Indian music and dance, with collaborators veena player Nirmala Rajasekar and bharatanatyam dance group Ragamala.
