= Alleluia (Thompson) =

Musical composition by Randall Thompson

- Motet by Randall Thompson
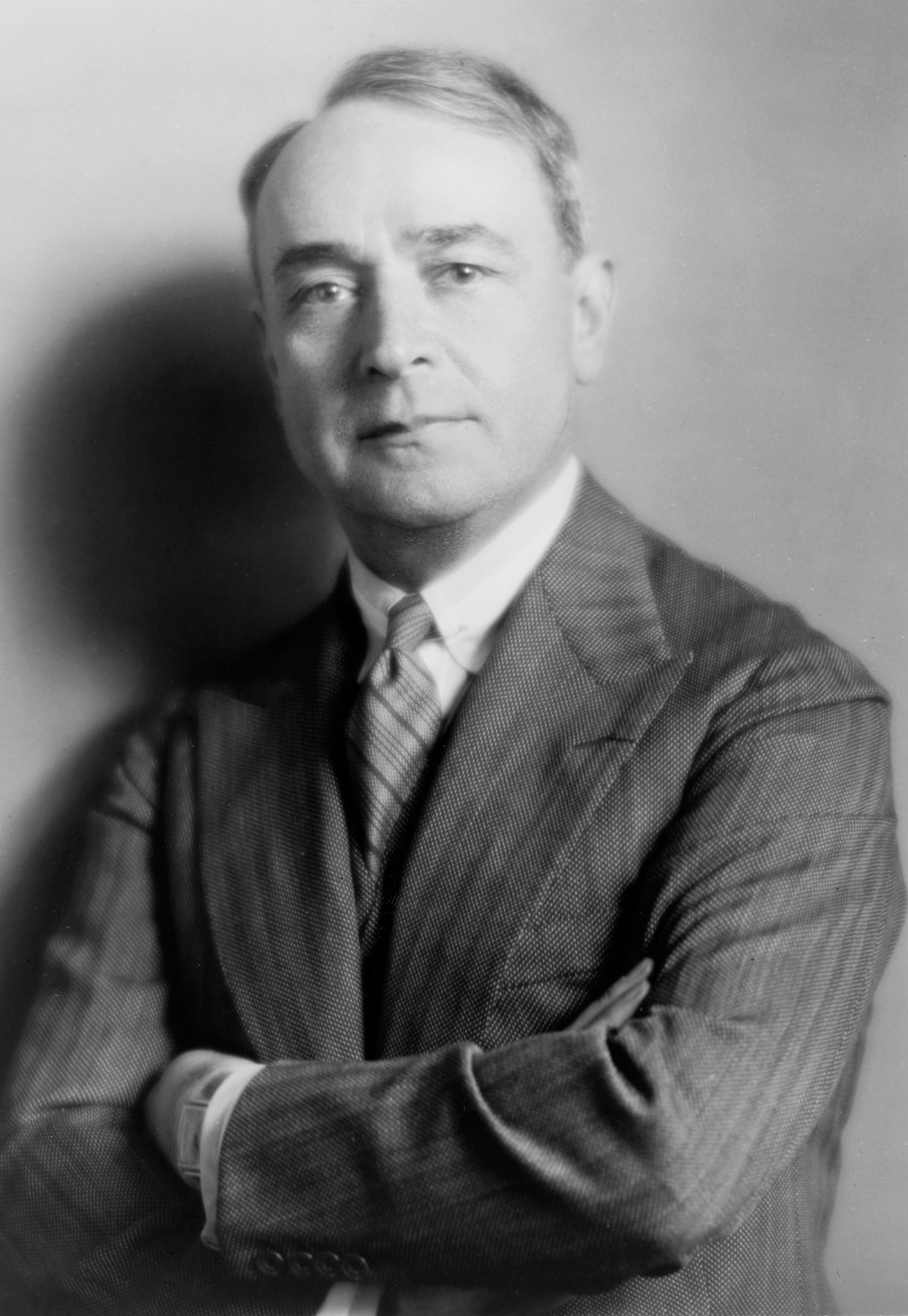
- Serge Koussevitzky who commissioned the piece
- Key: D major
- Occasion: Opening of the Tanglewood Festival
- Text: "Alleluia. Amen."
- Composed: 1940
- Performed: July 8, 1940: Tanglewood
- Vocal: SATB chorus

Alleluia is a piece for unaccompanied SATB chorus by Randall Thompson. Composed over the first five days of July in 1940, it was given its world premiere on July 8 of that year at the Berkshire Music Center at Tanglewood under the direction of G. Wallace Woodworth.

The work was written on a commission from Serge Koussevitzky, director of the Tanglewood Festival. Koussevitzky wanted a "fanfare" for voices to be performed at the opening exercises of the new Berkshire Music Center, and he asked Thompson to contribute such a piece. Instead of the joyous work expected of him, the composer produced a quiet and introspective piece. Thompson was inspired by the war in Europe, and the recent fall of France; given these events, he felt that to write a festive piece would be inappropriate.

The text of the work consists of the word "Alleluia" repeated over and over again. The only other word in the text is "Amen", which is used once at the end, by the sopranos, tenors, and basses dividing.

Thompson wrote that the Alleluia is

a very sad piece. The word "Alleluia" has so many possible interpretations. The music in my particular Alleluia cannot be made to sound joyous. It is a slow, sad piece, and...here it is comparable to the Book of Job, where it is written, "The Lord gave and the Lord has taken away. Blessed be the name of the Lord."

The piece has become Thompson's most popular work, and is frequently performed today. It regularly opens the Tanglewood Festival.
