= Arthur Fickenscher =

American composer

Arthur Fickenscher (March 9, 1871 in Aurora, Illinois – April 15, 1954 in San Francisco, California) was an American composer and academic. The first head of the music department of the University of Virginia, he is credited with being an early 20th-century pioneer of microtonal music.

== Career ==
Fickenscher studied music in Munich under Joseph Rheinberger and lived then as a teacher in Oakland, California, and Charlottesville, Virginia. From 1911 to 1914, he was a vocal teacher in Berlin. From 1920 until 1941 he was the first head of the music department at the University of Virginia. From about 1923 to 1933 he was the conductor of the Virginia Glee Club, a male choral ensemble at the University of Virginia.

He composed a Mimodrama, orchestral variations in the medieval style, a Dies Irae, visions for voice and orchestra, church works, a piano quintet, and various songs (including the song cycle Willowwood). His first major work, Visions for dramatic soprano and orchestra, received its premiere at the Royal Conservatory in Berlin in 1913 to acclaim from the New York Times. Recordings have been made of his song cycle Willowwood and his piano quintet From the seventh Realm; of the latter, Percy Grainger wrote, "While I am a reverent admirer of the piano and string quintets by Bach, César Franck, Brahms, Cyril Scott and others, I must confess that this American work by Fickenscher out-soars them all, for my ears, in point of spiritual rapture and sensuous loveliness."

Fickenscher also invented the Polytone, a keyboard instrument that could produce sixty distinct tones within the scope of an octave.

== Works ==
- Visions, symphonic seal for dramatic soprano and large orchestra, 1912
- Willowwood and Well Away, 1925
- Day of Judgement, 1927
- Out of the Gay Nineties, 1934
- From the seventh realm, Piano Quintet, 1939
- Aucalete, symphonic poetry, 1945
- Lament for organ, 1951
- Improvisational Fantasy for organ, 1954
- Aucassin and Nicolete, symphonic poetry for chorus and orchestra
- The Chamber Blue, poetry for chorus and orchestra
- The Land East of the Sun, symphonic poetry for chorus and orchestra
- Old Irish Tune for chamber orchestra
- Evolutionary Quartet, String Quartet
- Willowwood for alto, viola and piano
