= Stephen Tuttle =

20th century American musicologist and musical educator

Stephen Davidson Tuttle (May 4, 1907 – April 9, 1954) was a musicologist and chairman of the department of music at the University of Virginia (1941–1952), and an associate professor of music at Harvard University (1952–1954). While at Virginia he directed the Virginia Glee Club, and commissioned Randall Thompson to write The Testament of Freedom for the Glee Club in commemoration of the 200th anniversary of the birth of Thomas Jefferson.

Tuttle was the son of Baptist missionaries and spent his childhood in the family home of Parkersburg, West Virginia, and in India. Tuttle studied music at Denison University and Harvard University, where he was the roommate of composer Elliott Carter; their acquaintance resulted in Carter's composition "To Music." Following his graduation, he taught music at Harvard from 1937 to 1941 before taking the appointment at Virginia, joining the faculty along with Randall Thompson and James E. Berdahl.

After joining the faculty at Virginia, Tuttle collaborated with Randall Thompson, whom he assisted in teaching undergraduate music courses. It was during this time that the commission of a piece in memory of Thomas Jefferson's bicentennial occurred. Tuttle conducted the premiere of The Testament of Freedom on April 13, 1943; the premiere was broadcast over the CBS network and via shortwave to US forces serving overseas in World War II. In the early 1950s, Tuttle returned to Harvard in the capacity of an associate professor. He died of a heart attack in his home in Cambridge at the age of 47.

Dr. Tuttle was active in the field of Renaissance music, editing volumes of music by Thomas Tomkins and William Byrd. The Tomkins work was supported by a Guggenheim fellowship that Tuttle won in 1948.
