= Antonia Brico =

Dutch-born American conductor (1902–1989)

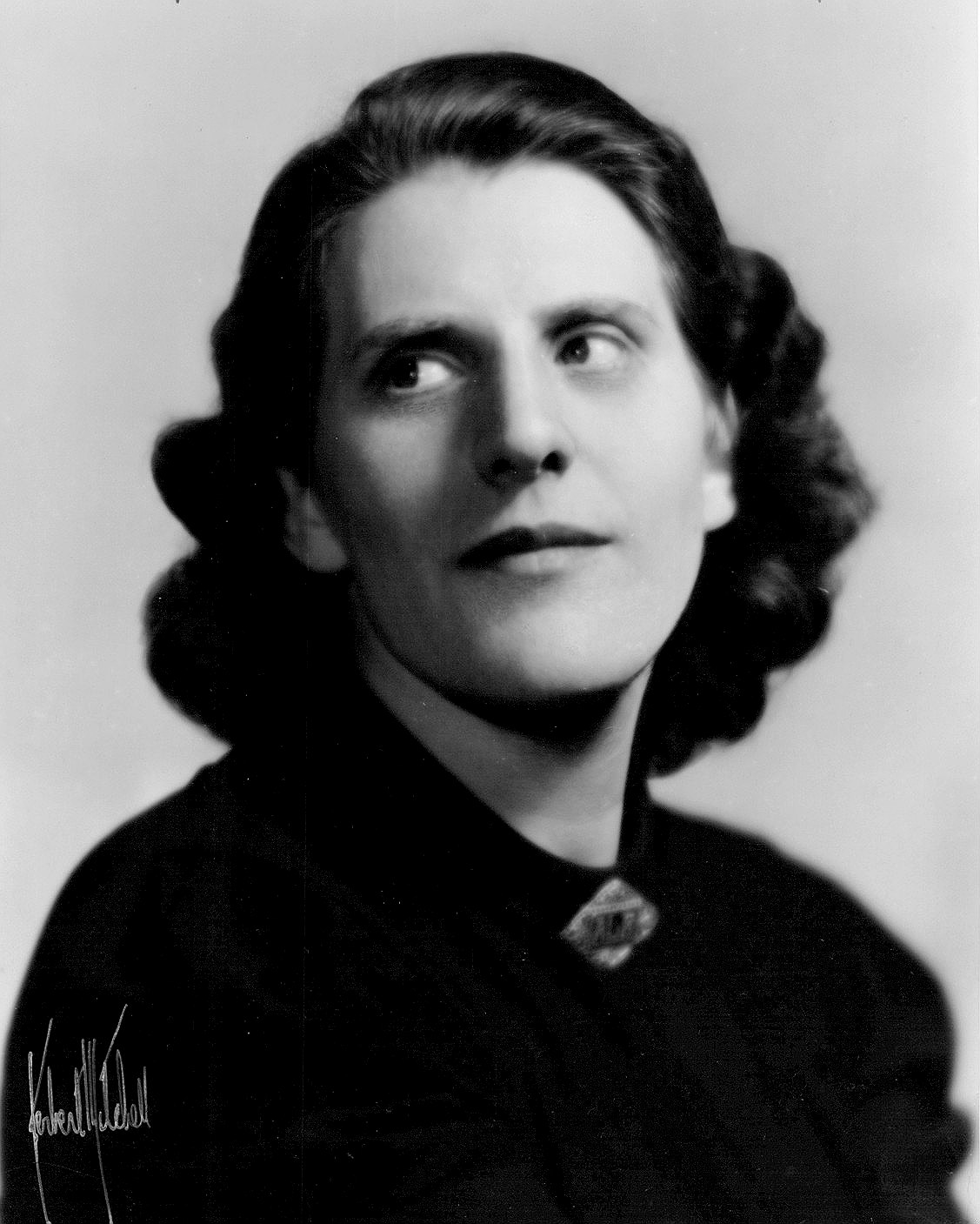
- Antonia Brico, 1940

Background information
- Born: June 26, 1902; Rotterdam, Netherlands
- Died: August 3, 1989 (aged 87) Denver, Colorado, United States
- Genre: Classical
- Occupations: Conductor, pianist

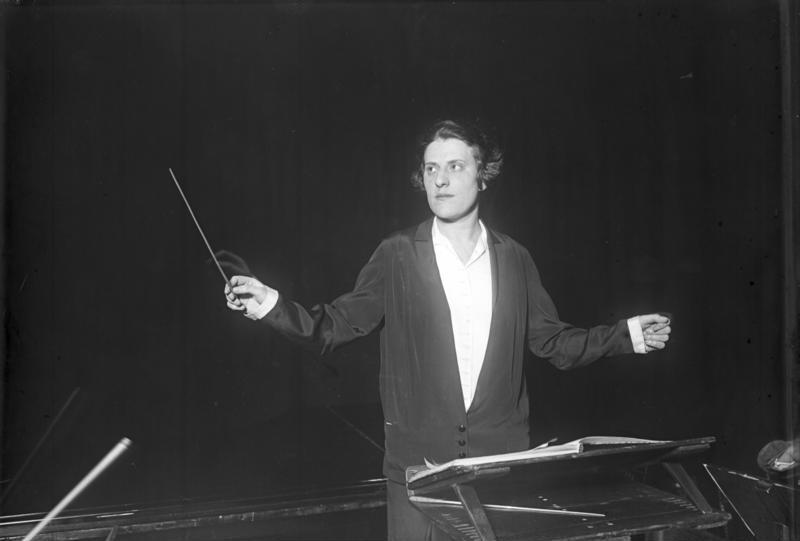
Brico conducting at the Alte Philharmonie Berlin, 1930

Antonia Louisa Brico (June 26, 1902 – August 3, 1989) was a Dutch-born American conductor and pianist.

== Early life and education ==
Born Antonia Louisa Brico to a Dutch Catholic unmarried mother in Rotterdam, Netherlands, Brico was renamed Wilhelmina Wolthuis by her foster parents. She and her foster parents migrated to the United States in 1908 and settled in California. On leaving Oakland Technical High School in Oakland in 1919 she was already an accomplished pianist and had experience in conducting. At the University of California, Berkeley, Brico worked as an assistant to the director of the San Francisco Opera. Following her graduation in 1923 she studied piano under a variety of teachers, most notably under Zygmunt Stojowski.

In 1927, Brico entered the Berlin State Academy of Music and in 1929 graduated from its master class in conducting. During that period she was also a pupil of Karl Muck, conductor of the Hamburg Philharmonic Orchestra, with whom she studied for a further three years after graduation.

== Career ==
Following her debut as a professional conductor with the Berlin Philharmonic Orchestra in February 1930, Brico worked with the San Francisco Symphony and the Hamburg Philharmonic, winning plaudits from critics and the public. Appearances as guest conductor of the Musicians' Symphony Orchestra in Detroit, Washington, D.C., and other sites soon followed. In 1934, she was appointed conductor of the newly founded Women's Symphony Orchestra which, in January 1939 (following the admission of men), became the Brico Symphony Orchestra.

In July 1938, Brico was the first woman to conduct the New York Philharmonic, and in 1939 conducted the Federal Orchestra in concerts at the 1939 New York World's Fair. During an extensive European tour, in which she appeared both as a pianist and a conductor, Brico was invited by Jean Sibelius to conduct the Helsinki Symphony Orchestra.

Brico settled in Denver, Colorado in 1942. Here she founded a Bach Society and the Women's String Ensemble. She also conducted the Denver Businessmen's Orchestra, which in 1968 became the Brico Symphony Orchestra, and in 1948 she became conductor of the Denver Community Symphony (later the Denver Philharmonic). She was conductor of the Boulder Philharmonic Orchestra from 1958-1963. She taught piano or conducting to such students as Judy Collins, Donald Loach, James Erb and Karlos Moser. Brico continued to appear as guest conductor with orchestras around the world, including the Japan Women's Symphony.

A documentary film about Brico's life, entitled Antonia: A Portrait of the Woman, directed by Judy Collins and Jill Godmilow, appeared in 1974. In it, Brico candidly described her career-long struggle with gender bias that kept her from conducting more frequently. The film was nominated for an Academy Award for Best Documentary Feature and its popularity was partially responsible for invitations for Brico to conduct the Mostly Mozart Festival Orchestra in sold-out concerts recorded by Columbia Records in 1975, and the Brooklyn Philharmonia in 1977. In 2003, the film was deemed "culturally, historically, or aesthetically significant" by the United States Library of Congress and selected for preservation in the National Film Registry.

== Death and legacy ==
Brico died in 1989 after a long illness at the age of 87. She had lived at the Bella Vita Towers, a nursing home in Denver, since 1988.

History Colorado, formerly the Colorado Historical Society, holds a large collection of her personal papers. She was inducted into the Colorado Women's Hall of Fame in 1986.

Dutch director Maria Peters' movie De Dirigent (The Conductor) about the life of Brico, starring Christanne de Bruijn as Antonia Brico, was released in 2018.

Children's picture book In One Ear & Out the Other: Antonia Brico & her amazingly musical life by Diane Worthey and illustrated by Morgana Wallace was published by Penny Candy Books in 2020. The book is a Junior Library Guild Gold Standard Selection.

The fictional conductor Lydia Tár describes Brico in the 2022 film Tár, "by all accounts was an incredible conductor but was ghettoized into the non-glamorous status of 'guest conductor' and essentially treated as a dog act."

== See also ==
- List of female conductors
