= The Testament of Freedom =

Choral composition by Randall Thompson

The Testament of Freedom is a four-movement work for men's chorus and piano composed in 1943 by Randall Thompson. It was premiered on April 13, 1943, by the Virginia Glee Club under the direction of Stephen Tuttle; the composer served as pianist. Thompson later orchestrated the piece, and also produced an arrangement for mixed chorus. The music was published in 1944.

== History ==
The piece was written for the Virginia Glee Club while Thompson was teaching at the University of Virginia, and was meant to celebrate the bicentennial of the birth of Thomas Jefferson; consequently, the text for the work was taken from Jefferson's writings. Although it was meant as an occasional work, the piece was soon seen as an opportunity to project an uplifting message about the United States in wartime; its premiere was recorded by CBS and quickly broadcast nationwide. It was also transmitted by shortwave radio over the United States Office of War Information (OWI) network to Allied servicemen stationed in Europe.

On April 14, 1945, it was performed by Serge Koussevitzky and the Boston Symphony Orchestra at Carnegie Hall as part of a concert in memory of Franklin D. Roosevelt, who had died two days earlier. The piece continues to be popular and is performed frequently by men's choruses, as well as mixed choruses. In November 2017, the UVA University Singers and Charlottesville Symphony led by conductor Michael Slon recorded the orchestrated SATB version on UVA's Old Cabell Hall stage, site of the world premiere.

== Style ==
The first of the piece's four movements is similar in style to a hymn; it opens with a five-note instrumental invocation meant to rhythmically spell out the name "Thomas Jefferson". The melody used in the movement reappears in various forms throughout the rest of the piece. The second movement is slower in nature, and resembles a dirge; numerous writers, including Virgil Thomson, commented on its resemblance to Eastern Orthodox chant. The third movement is a scherzo, while the fourth recapitulates themes heard in the other movements. The work ends with a return of the initial melody and text.

== Texts ==
First movement

The God who gave us life gave us liberty at the same time; the hand of force may destroy but cannot disjoin them.

—A Summary View of the Rights of British America (1774)

Second movement

We have counted the cost of this contest, and find nothing so dreadful as voluntary slavery. Honor, justice, and humanity forbid us tamely to surrender that freedom which we received from our gallant ancestors, and which our innocent posterity have a right to receive from us. We cannot endure the infamy and guilt of resigning succeeding generations to that wretchedness which inevitably awaits them if we basely entail hereditary bondage upon them.

Our cause is just. Our union is perfect. Our internal resources are great… We gratefully acknowledge, as signal instances of the Divine favor towards us, that His Providence would not permit us to be called into this severe controversy until we were grown up to our present strength, had been previously exercised in warlike operation, and possessed of the means of defending ourselves. With hearts fortified with these animating reflections, we most solemnly, before God and the world, declare that, exerting the utmost energy of those powers which our beneficent Creator hath graciously bestowed upon us, the arms we have been compelled by our enemies to assume we will, in defiance of every hazard, with unabating firmness and perseverance, employ for the preservation of our liberties; being with one mind resolved to die freemen rather than to live slaves.

—Declaration of the Causes and Necessity of Taking Up Arms (July 6, 1775)

Third movement

We fight not for glory or for conquest. We exhibit to mankind the remarkable spectacle of a people attacked by unprovoked enemies, without any imputation or even suspicion of offense. They boast of their privileges and civilization, and yet proffer no milder conditions than servitude or death.

In our native land, in defense of the freedom that is our birthright and which we ever enjoyed till the late violation of it; for the protection of our property, acquired solely by the honest industry of our forefathers and ourselves; against violence actually offered; we have taken up arms. We shall lay them down when hostilities shall cease on the part of the aggressors and all danger of their being renewed shall be removed, and not before.

—Declaration of the Causes and Necessity of Taking Up Arms (July 6, 1775)

Fourth movement

I shall not die without a hope that light and liberty are on steady advance... And even should the cloud of barbarism and despotism again obscure the science and liberties of Europe, this country remains to preserve and restore light and liberty to them...The flames kindled on the 4th of July, 1776, have spread over too much of the globe to be extinguished by the feeble engines of despotism; on the contrary, they will consume these engines and all who work them.

—Letter to John Adams, Monticello (September 12, 1821)

The God who gave us life gave us liberty at the same time; the hand of force may destroy but cannot disjoin them.
