= James Erb =

American composer, arranger, musicologist and conductor

James "Jim" Bryan Erb (January 25, 1926 – November 11, 2014) was an American composer, arranger, musicologist, and conductor. The founding conductor of the Richmond Symphony Chorus, Erb led that chorus from 1971 to 2007 while also directing chorus activities at the University of Richmond, where he was for a while chair of the music department. Erb is most broadly known for his arrangement of the folk song "Shenandoah". He also edited the Bärenreiter edition of Orlando di Lasso's complete Magnificats.

== Career ==
Erb was born in La Junta, Colorado. After serving in the United States Army during World War II, Erb completed his undergraduate education in music at Colorado College. He also studied at the University of Music and Performing Arts, Vienna. He later earned a master's degree in voice at Indiana University School of Music and a doctorate from Harvard University.

He began teaching music at a junior high school in Cheyenne, Wyoming. Beginning in 1954 he taught music and conducted the choirs and glee clubs at the University of Richmond in Richmond, Virginia, where he taught until his retirement in 1994. While teaching at Richmond, he won the university's Distinguished Educator Award three times. It was during this period that he composed his arrangement of the folk tune "Shenandoah", for a tour of Europe by the University of Richmond Choir.

In addition to the Richmond Symphony Chorus, Erb also conducted the group Chorus of Alumni and Friends of the University of Richmond (CAFUR), originally associated with the University of Richmond. CAFUR's final concert was in 1994 with the singing of Rachmaninoff's Vespers. In 2014, he died at the age of 88 in Richmond.

== Works ==
Erb's published arrangements include sources from classical, liturgical, and folk music. Among the better known arrangements is Erb's version of "Shenandoah", called "one of the classic arrangements sung by high school and college choirs across the country." The arrangement has been performed by numerous choirs, including the Virginia Glee Club (who commissioned the TTBB version), the Chanticleer ensemble in an arrangement that combines it with the Marshall Bartholomew version, and the Mormon Tabernacle Choir, whose performance of it appeared on the soundtrack to the 1995 film Nixon.
