= James Hilton (academic) =

American academic administrator and university librarian

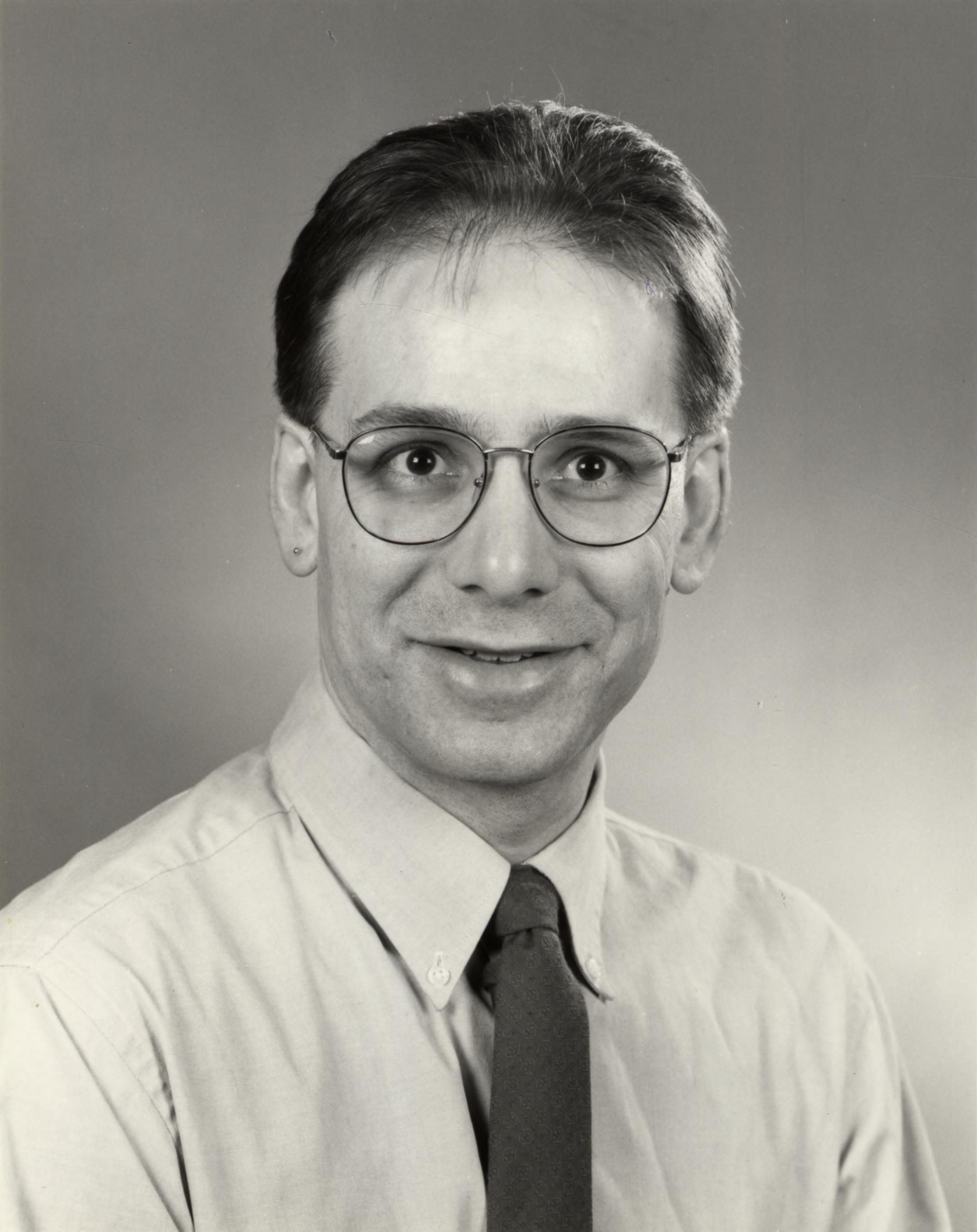
University of Michigan faculty portrait

James Loyd Hilton (born January 23, 1959) is an American psychologist, educator, and academic administrator.

Hilton served as University Librarian and Dean of Libraries at the University of Michigan since September 1, 2013. He was also Vice Provost for Academic Innovation, responsible for developing strategies and policies around educational technology and other cross-campus digital education initiatives. He stepped down as head of the U-M Library on June 30, 2022.

== Education ==
Hilton received a bachelor of arts with a major in psychology from the University of Texas at Austin in 1981. He received a master of arts and a doctor of philosophy in social psychology from Princeton University in 1983 and 1985, respectively.

== Career ==
Hilton served as vice president and Chief Information Officer at the University of Virginia from 2006 until 2013. From 2001 to 2006 he was the Associate Provost for Academic Information and Instructional Technology Affairs at the University of Michigan, and served as the Interim University Librarian for one year in 2005. Hilton was a member of the faculty at the University of Michigan in the Psychology Department where he served as the Chair of Undergraduate Studies between 1991 and 2000.

Hilton is a three-time recipient of the University of Michigan's Literature, Science, and the Arts Excellence in Education award, an Arthur F. Thurnau Professor, and recipient of the Class of 1923 Memorial Teaching Award. He published in the areas of information technology policy, person perception, stereotypes, and the psychology of suspicion.

== Awards, fellowships, and honors ==
Awards include:

- CIC Academic Leadership Program Fellow, 1997–98
- Sweetland Writing Center Fellow, University of Michigan, 1997–98
- L.S.A. Excellence in Education Award, University of Michigan, 1995
- L.S.A. Excellence in Education Award, University of Michigan, 1994
- L.S.A. Excellence in Education Award, University of Michigan, 1992
- Class of 1923 Memorial Teaching Award, University of Michigan, 1991
- Master Lecturer Award from the Michigan Psychological Association, 1989

== Board memberships ==
- DuraSpace
- Internet2 Board of Trustees
- Digital Preservation Network

== Personal life ==
He has been married to Molly Pitts Hilton since 1982 and has two children.
