= Golan v. Holder =

- Supreme Court of the United States

Argued October 5, 2011 Decided January 18, 2012
- Full case name: Lawrence Golan, et al. v. Eric H. Holder, Jr., Attorney General, et al.
- Docket no.: 10-545
- Citations: 565 U.S. 302 (more) 132 S. Ct. 873; 181 L. Ed. 2d 835

Case history
- Prior: Golan v. Ashcroft, 310 F. Supp. 2d 1215 (D. Colo. 2004); affirmed sub nom. Golan v. Gonzales, 501 F.3d 1179 (10th Cir. 2007); on remand, Golan v. Holder, 611 F. Supp. 2d 1165 (D. Colo. 2009); reversed, 609 F.3d 1076 (10th Cir. 2010); cert. granted, 562 U.S. 1270 (2011).

Holding
- "Limited time" language of Copyright Clause does not preclude the extension of copyright protections to works previously in the public domain.

Court membership
- Chief Justice John Roberts Associate Justices Antonin Scalia · Anthony Kennedy; Clarence Thomas · Ruth Bader Ginsburg; Stephen Breyer · Samuel Alito; Sonia Sotomayor · Elena Kagan

Case opinions
- Majority: Ginsburg, joined by Roberts, Scalia, Kennedy, Thomas, Sotomayor
- Dissent: Breyer, joined by Alito
- Kagan took no part in the consideration or decision of the case.

Laws applied
- Uruguay Round Agreements Act, Copyright Clause

Golan v. Holder, (Note: The full title of the case was Lawrence Golan, Richard Kapp, S.A. Publishing Co., Ind., d/b/a/ ESS.A.Y. Recordings, Symphony of the Canyons, Ron Hall d/b/a/ Festival Films, and John McDonough, d/b/a/ Timeless Video Alternatives International v. Alberto Gonzales, in his official capacity as Attorney General of the United States, and Marybeth Peters, Register of Copyrights, Copyright Office of the United States. The case was originally Golan v. Ashcroft, because John Ashcroft was the Attorney General at the time it was originally filed, and was recaptioned Golan v. Gonzales when Gonzales assumed the office. The case's title later became Golan v. Holder when it was reconsidered, to reflect that the office was occupied by Eric Holder.) 565 U.S. 302 (2012), was a US Supreme Court case that dealt with copyright and the public domain. It held that the "limited time" language of the United States Constitution's Copyright Clause does not preclude the extension of copyright protections to works previously in the public domain.

In particular, the case challenged the constitutionality of the application of Section 514 of the Uruguay Round Agreements Act of 1994, which implemented the provisions of trade agreements seeking to equalize copyright protection on an international basis. In the United States, the Act restored copyright for foreign works that had previously entered the public domain in the United States.

The two main arguments against the application of the Act in the case were that restoring copyright violates the "limited time" language of the United States Constitution's Copyright Clause, and that restoring to copyright works that had passed into the public domain interferes with the people's First Amendment right to use, copy and otherwise exploit the works and to freely express themselves through these works, thus also violating the Constitution's Copyright Clause.

The US Supreme Court held on January 18, 2012 that Section 514 of the Uruguay Round Agreements Act does not exceed Congress's authority under the Copyright Clause, and the court affirmed the judgment of the lower court by 6–2, with the opinion written by Justice Ginsburg. The practical effect of the decision is to confirm that works that were previously free to use, such as Prokofiev's Peter and the Wolf, are no longer in the public domain and are subject to use only with the permission of the copyright holder, such as through paid licensing, until their copyright term expires again.

== History ==
After the Supreme Court of the United States upheld the 1998 Copyright Term Extension Act in Eldred v. Ashcroft (2003), the United States District Court for the District of Colorado dismissed the plaintiffs' challenge to that act in 2004 (Golan v. Ashcroft). The remaining constitutional challenge to the 1994 Uruguay Round Agreements Act was dismissed the following year (Golan v. Gonzales).

The case affected the copyright status of potentially millions of works, including:

- Metropolis (1927)
- The Third Man (1949)
- The works of Igor Stravinsky
- Several works of H. G. Wells, including the film Things to Come (1936)

The case was heard by District Chief Judge Lewis Babcock and was decided by the United States District Court for the District of Colorado in 2005. It was appealed at the Tenth Circuit.

On September 4, 2007, Judge Robert H. Henry of the United States Court of Appeals for the Tenth Circuit affirmed the district court's dismissal of the CTEA claim, as foreclosed by Eldred, and the district court's holding that § 514 of the URAA does not exceed the limitations inherent in the Copyright Clause.

However, the Appeals Court did find "Based on the Eldred Court's analysis, we examine the bedrock principle of copyright law that works in the public domain remain there and conclude that § 514 alters the traditional contours of copyright protection by deviating from this principle" and concluded "since § 514 has altered the traditional contours of copyright protection in a manner that implicates plaintiffs' right to free expression, it must be subject to First Amendment review." It remanded the case to the district court.

== U.S. Supreme Court ==
A related issue was then brought before the court as Golan v. Holder after conductors Lawrence Golan and Richard Kapp filed suit. In a holding published on April 3, 2009, Judge Babcock reversed his earlier finding that the First Amendment was not applicable to resurrecting foreign copyright claims. Judge Babcock found that aspects of the 1994 Uruguay Round Agreements Act, which brought some works whose copyright had lapsed back under copyright, violated First Amendment rights of so-called reliance parties, i.e., parties who had been using a work formerly in the public domain before the URAA became effective, relying on the work being in the public domain, and who would now no longer be able to do so. He wrote,

In the United States, that body of law includes the bedrock principle that works in the public domain remain in the public domain. Removing works from the public domain violated Plaintiffs' vested First Amendment interests. [...] Accordingly—to the extent Section 514 suppresses the right of reliance parties to use works they exploited while the works were in the public domain—Section 514 is substantially broader than necessary to achieve the Government's interest.

He also indicated a possible solution by suggesting that the protection of reliance parties be made not limited in time. However, further appeals by copyright owners were expected.

On June 21, 2010, the Tenth Circuit reversed the judgment of the district court and remanded with instructions to grant summary judgment in favor of the government, thus upholding the constitutionality of the URAA copyright restoration. Golan filed for certiorari in the Supreme Court of the United States asking for the Court to hear the case. On March 7, 2011, the Court granted the writ of certiorari. Oral argument was held October 5, 2011.

On June 12, 2011, the International Music Score Library Project (IMSLP, Petrucci Music Library) announced they would submit an amicus curiae brief in the case; a group of Harvard Law School students, supervised by Professor Charles Nesson, represented IMSLP. Other parties that filed amicus curiae briefs in support of the petitioners include:

- The Electronic Frontier Foundation on behalf of the Internet Archive and the University of Michigan Dean of Libraries. Joining were the Wikimedia Foundation, the American Library Association, the Association of College and Research Libraries, and the Association of Research Libraries.
- H. Tomas Gomez-Arostegui (Lewis & Clark Law School) and Tyler T. Ochoa (Santa Clara University School of Law)
- The Eagle Forum Education & Legal Defense Fund
- Professor Daniel J. Gervais (Professor at Vanderbilt University Law School)
- Public Knowledge
- Cato Institute
- Peter Decherney
- Heartland Angels
- Creative Commons
- Public Domain Interests
- The Justice and Freedom Fund
- Professors and Fellows from the Information Society Project at Yale Law School
- The American Civil Liberties Union
- The Conductors Guild
- The Music Library Association
- The American Library Association (which also joined the Internet Archive's brief)
- The College Art Association
- Google

Additionally, amicus briefs in support of the respondents were filed by:

- The International Publishers Association
- The International Coalition for Copyright Protection
- The American Society of Composers, Authors and Publishers (ASCAP)
- The Intellectual Property Owners Association (IPO)
- The Motion Picture Association of America (MPAA)
- The American Bar Association
- The Franklin Pierce Center for Intellectual Property
- The American Intellectual Property Law Association.

=== Decision ===
On January 18, 2012, the Supreme Court affirmed the Tenth Circuit's decision 6–2. The majority opinion was written by Justice Ginsburg and joined by Roberts, Scalia, Kennedy, Thomas, and Sotomayor. The dissent was written by Justice Breyer and joined by Justice Alito. Justice Kagan recused.

The majority held that "The Berne Convention for the Protection of Literary and Artistic Works (Berne), which took effect in 1886, is the principal accord governing international copyright relations." The court also held that changing the term of copyright for works in such a way that it diminishes or eliminates rights in the work (in this case the right of the public to the works) does not violate the takings clause of the Fifth Amendment.

==== Dissenting opinion ====
Breyer, dissenting, wrote:

The statute before us, however, does not encourage anyone to produce a single new work. By definition, it bestows monetary rewards only on owners of old works—works that have already been created and already are in the American public domain.

== See also ==
- List of United States Supreme Court cases, volume 565
- List of copyright case law
