= Frank Albinder =

American chorus conductor

Frank Scott Albinder is a conductor of male choral music. A former director of Chanticleer, Albinder currently conducts the Washington Men's Camerata, the Woodley Ensemble, and the Virginia Glee Club, and is president of Intercollegiate Men's Choruses, Inc., a national association of men's choruses. Albinder designed the concept and chose the repertoire for Chanticleer's Grammy Award–winning album Colors of Love. Albinder holds degrees in conducting and vocal performance. Perhaps his best-known work is the vocal solo of Loch Lomond, featured on the Chanticleer album Wondrous Love. He is a past president of the Alumni Association of Pomona College in Claremont, California. Albinder lives and works primarily in the District of Columbia.

In 2023, Albinder announced his intention to retire from the Washington Men's Camerata at the close of the 2023–2024 season.

== Positions held ==
- American Choral Directors Association; past National Repertoire and Standards Chair for Male Choirs
- President of Intercollegiate Men's Choruses, Inc.
- Boston Camerata; Vocalist
- Chanticleer; Associate Conductor, acting director, Vocalist
- ChoralNet; Vice President
- The Church of the Presidents; Vocalist, Music Staff
- Google Glass Explorer
- Concord Ensemble; Vocalist
- Davidson College; Director of Choral Activities
- Robert Shaw Festival Singers; Vocalist
- Virginia Glee Club at the University of Virginia; Conductor (2003–Present)
- Washington Bach Consort; Vocalist
- Washington Men's Camerata; Music Director (1999–2024)
- Woodley Ensemble; Music Director
- National Collegiate Choral Organization; National Board Member
