= Denver Philharmonic Orchestra =

Orchestra in Denver, Colorado, U.S.

- semi-professional orchestra
- Short name: DPO
- Former name: Denver Businessmen's Orchestra (1948–1968); Brico Symphhomy (1968–1984); Centennial Philharmonic Orchestra (1984–2004)
- Founded: 1948 (78 years ago) (by Antonia Brico)
- Location: Denver, Colorado, U.S.
- Concert hall: Antonia Brico Stage at Central Presbyterian Church (since 2015)
- Principal conductor: Horst Buchholz (conductor laureate)
- Music director: Lawrence Golan (since 2013)
- Website: denverphilharmonic.org

The Denver Philharmonic Orchestra (DPO) is a semi-professional orchestra in Denver, Colorado, United States.

Led by music director Lawrence Golan, the DPO performs six concerts per season on the Antonia Brico Stage at Central Presbyterian Church.

== History and operations ==
Antonia Brico founded the DPO as the Denver Businessmen's Orchestra in 1948. Brico, who was the first woman to conduct the New York Philharmonic orchestra (1938), debuted the orchestra to a full auditorium. The premiere performance received a telegram from composer Jean Sibelius wishing good luck.

In 1968, the name was changed to the Brico Symphony. Brico remained as music director until 1984.

Russian-American conductor Julius Glaihengauz became DPO's second music director. A graduate of the Moscow Conservatory, Glaihengauz led the orchestra for eleven seasons under its new name, Centennial Philharmonic. An interim director, Kirk Smith, led the orchestra for one season following Glaihengauz's departure.

In 1999, Dr. Horst Buchholz became the third music director, and in 2004, the Centennial Philharmonic Orchestra became the Denver Philharmonic Orchestra. Buchholz, who was a professor of music at the University of Denver, served as music director and conductor until 2009. Following his departure, he was appointed the orchestra's first conductor laureate. Adam Flatt served as music director from 2010 through 2013.

Since 2013, Lawrence Golan has been DPO's music director. Golan is a professor and music director at the University of Denver's Lamont School of Music. In summer 2016, Golan led the DPO on its first international tour – a fourteen-city, fourteen-concert tour across China.

The Denver Philharmonic has entered into an innovative multi-year partnership with the Bayerische Philharmonie in Munich, Germany. In October 2017, the Denver Philharmonic sent musicians to Munich to perform in Hercules Hall in the Munich Residenz in downtown Munich.

The DPO made its home at KPOF Hall for fifty-one years, and in December 2015, the orchestra moved to its new venue at Central Presbyterian Church. In summer 2016, the church's chancel was remodeled into a flat stage to accommodate the orchestra; the Antonia Brico Stage is named for and dedicated to DPO's founder.

== See also ==
- List of orchestras in the United States
- Music of Colorado
