= Uruguay Round Agreements Act =

1994 United States law

- Other short titles: General Agreement on Tariffs and Trade
- Long title: An Act to approve and implement the trade agreements concluded in the Uruguay Round of multilateral trade negotiations.
- Acronyms (colloquial): URAA
- Enacted by: the 103rd United States Congress
- Effective: December 8, 1994

Citations
- Public law: 103-465
- Statutes at Large: 108 Stat. 4809

Codification
- Titles amended: 19 U.S.C.: Customs Duties
- U.S.C. sections created: 19 U.S.C. ch. 22 §§ 3501, 3511–3556, 3571–3572, 3581–3592, 3601–3624

Legislative history
- Introduced in the House as H.R. 5110 by Richard Gephardt (D-MO) on September 27, 1994; Committee consideration by House Ways and Means, House Agriculture, House Education and Labor, House Energy and Commerce, House Foreign Affairs, House Government Operations, House Judiciary, House Rules; Passed the House on November 29, 1994 (288–146, Roll call vote 507, via Clerk.House.gov); Passed the Senate on December 1, 1994 (76–24, Roll call vote 329, via Senate.gov); Signed into law by President Bill Clinton on December 8, 1994

United States Supreme Court cases
- Golan v. Holder

The Uruguay Round Agreements Act (URAA; Pub. L. 103–465, 108 Stat. 4809, enacted December 8, 1994) is an Act of Congress in the United States that implemented in U.S. law the Marrakesh Agreement of 1994. The Marrakesh Agreement was part of the Uruguay Round of negotiations which transformed the General Agreement on Tariffs and Trade (GATT) into the World Trade Organization (WTO). One of its effects is to give United States copyright protection to foreign works that had previously been in the public domain in the United States.

== Legislative history ==
U.S. President Bill Clinton sent the bill for the URAA to Congress on September 27, 1994, where it was introduced in the House of Representatives as H.R. 5110 and in the Senate as S. 2467. The bill was submitted under special fast-track procedures under which neither chamber could modify it. The House passed the bill on November 29, 1994; the Senate did so on December 1, 1994. President Clinton signed it into law on December 8, 1994 as Pub. L. 103–465. The URAA became effective on January 1, 1995. A number of technical corrections were made to the copyright provisions introduced by the URAA through the Copyright Technical Amendments Act (H.R. 672, which became Pub. L. 105-80) in 1997.

== Amendments to the U.S. copyright law ==
Title V of the URAA made several modifications to the copyright law of the United States. It amended Title 17 ("Copyrights") of the United States Code to include a completely reworded article 104A on copyright restorations on foreign works and to include a new chapter 11, containing a prohibition of bootleg sound and video recordings of live performances. In Title 18 of the U.S. Code, a new article 2319A was inserted, detailing the penal measures against infringements of this new bootlegging prohibition.

=== Copyright restorations ===
The U.S. had joined the Berne Convention on March 1, 1989, when its Berne Convention Implementation Act of 1988 entered in force. Article 18 of the Berne Convention specified that the treaty covered all works that were still copyrighted in their source country and that had not entered the public domain in the country where copyright was claimed due to the expiration of a previously granted copyright there. Consequently, the U.S. would have had to grant copyright on foreign works that were never copyrighted before in the U.S. But the United States denied this retroactivity of the Berne Convention and applied the rules of the treaty only to works first published after March 1, 1989. Earlier foreign works that were not covered by other treaties and that had until then not been subject to copyright in the U.S. remained uncopyrighted in the United States.

The U.S. faced harsh criticism for its unilateral denouncement of the retroactivity of the Berne Convention defined in article 18, and ultimately reversed its position. The copyright changes implemented by the URAA in 17 USC 104A remedied the situation and brought the U.S. legislation in-line with the requirements of the Berne Convention.

17 U.S.C. § 104A effectively copyrights many foreign works that were never before copyrighted in the U.S. The works are subject to the normal U.S. copyright term, as if they had never entered the public domain.

The affected works are those which were in the public domain either due to a lack of international copyright agreements between the U.S. and the country of origin of the work, or due to a failure to meet U.S. copyright registration and notification formalities. Also affected are works which did have previous U.S. copyright, but which entered the public domain due to a failure to renew the copyright. The law defines all of the affected works as "restored works" and the copyright granted to them as "restored copyright", even though many of the works never had U.S. copyright to restore.

Copyright restoration went into effect on January 1, 1996, for works from countries that were, on that date, members of either the Berne Convention, the World Trade Organization (WTO), the WIPO Copyright Treaty, or, for sound recordings, the WIPO Performances and Phonograms Treaty. Copyright restoration for works from other countries went into effect on the earliest adherence date of the country to one of these four treaties.

Excepted from the copyright restorations are foreign works where the copyright was ever owned or administered by the "Alien Property Custodian", if the restored copyright would be owned by a government or instrumentality thereof. Works simultaneously published within the United States and a treaty country were also ineligible for restoration, where "simultaneous publication" means "during the 30-day period following its first publication in the eligible country."

=== Administrative procedures ===
The URAA also included in 17 U.S.C. § 104A administrative procedures for dealing with cases where someone was already and in good faith using a work that had been in the public domain but on which the copyright was restored by the URAA. Such users are called "reliance parties" in that provision.

In particular, rightsholders had to file a so-called "Notice of Intent to Enforce" (NIE) their restored copyright, or had to inform earlier users of their works (i.e., existing reliance parties) of that fact. The NIEs were to be filed at the U.S. Copyright Office and were made publicly accessible. To enforce a restored copyright against a user who used the work without authorization from the rightsholder after the copyright had been restored, no NIE was necessary.

=== Challenges to the URAA restorations ===
The retroactive copyright restorations of the URAA have been challenged as violating the Constitution of the United States in two cases.

In Golan v. Gonzales, both the CTEA and the copyright restorations of the URAA were attacked as violating the Copyright and Patent clause (article I, §8, clause 8) of the U.S. constitution, which gives Congress the power "to promote the Progress of Science and useful Arts, by securing for limited Times to Authors and Inventors the exclusive Right to their respective Writings and Discoveries." (emphasis added). The plaintiffs claimed that the URAA violated the "limitedness" of the copyright term by removing works from the public domain and placing them under copyright again, and that doing so also did not promote the progress of science or the arts. Furthermore, plaintiffs claimed the URAA violated the First and the Fifth Amendment. These challenges were dismissed by the United States Court for the District of Colorado, but the decision was appealed to the Tenth Circuit Court of Appeals, which remanded the decision to the district court, ordering a fresh evaluation of First Amendment constitutionality.

On April 3, 2009, in the superseding case Golan v. Holder, Judge Lewis Babcock in the United States Court for the District of Colorado considered the URAA in violation of the First Amendment. The court held that URAA Section 514 was substantially broader than necessary to achieve the government interest. By restoring copyright to certain public domain works, and requiring royalty payments and restricting derivative works after one year following restoration, Congress overstepped its constitutional authority and failed to fully protect First Amendment interests of reliance parties in the works. On March 7, 2011, the Supreme Court granted a certiorari by Golan to hear the case. On January 18, 2012, the Supreme Court upheld the URAA in a 6–2 decision. The majority opinion was written by Justice Ginsburg and the dissent was written by Justice Breyer.

A second case, Luck's Music Library, Inc. v. Gonzales, which only addressed the Copyright and Patent Clause issue, was dismissed.

== See also ==
- Bilateral copyright agreements of the United States
