= Chanticleer (ensemble) =

American male classical vocal ensemble

- Choir
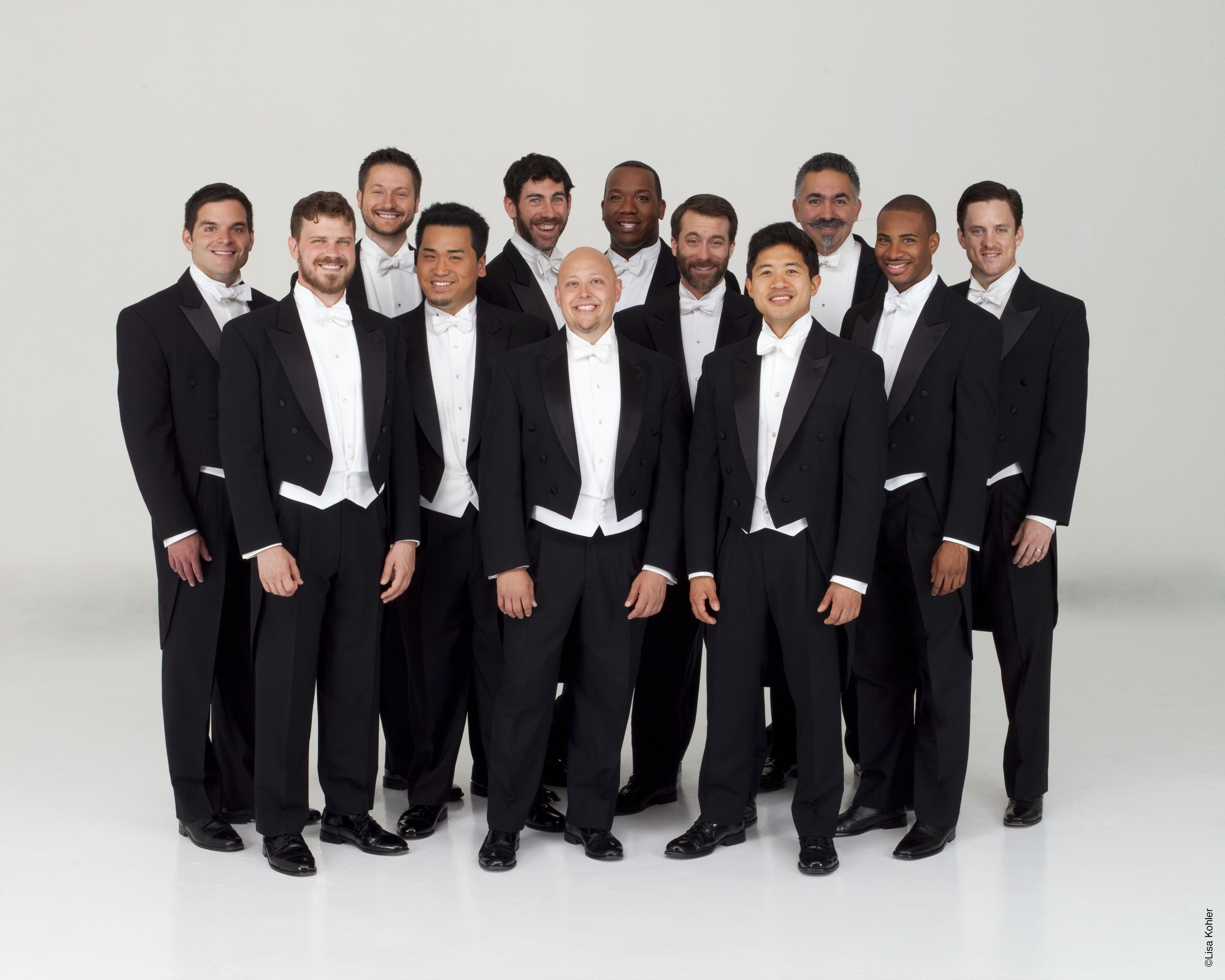
- Chanticleer: An Orchestra of Voices
- Origin: San Francisco, California
- Founded: June 27, 1978
- Genre: Vocal
- Members: Luke Elmer; Logan Shields; Tavian Cox; Cortez Mitchell; Adam Brett Ward; Bradley Sharpe; Vineel Garisa Mahal; Andrew Van Allsburg; Matthew Mazzola; Matthew Knickman; Jared Graveley
- Music director: Tim Keeler
- Headquarters: San Francisco
- Awards: Grammy Awards; Musical America's Ensemble of the Year; American Classical Music Hall of Fame
- Website: www.chanticleer.org

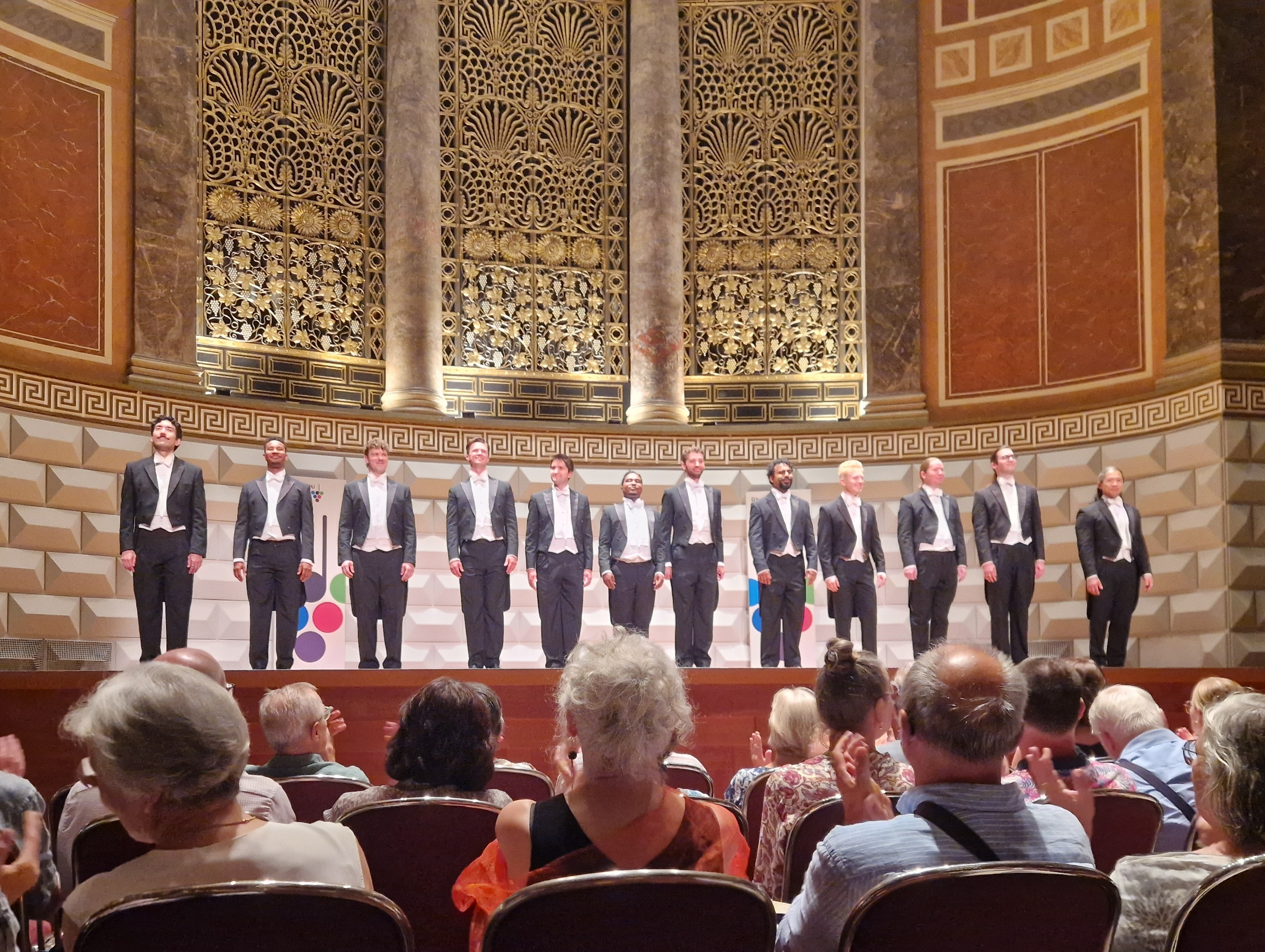
Chanticleer in a joint concert with Voces8 for the Rheingau Musik Festival, June 2026

Chanticleer (/ˈʃæntɪklir/) is an American male classical vocal ensemble based in San Francisco, California, founded in 1978. It is known for its interpretations of Renaissance music, for which they were founded, but also a wide repertoire of jazz, gospel and contemporary classical music. Its name is derived from the "clear singing rooster" in Chaucer's The Canterbury Tales. The ensemble has made award-winning recordings.

== History ==
Chanticleer was founded in 1978 by tenor Louis Botto, who sang with the group until 1989, and served as Artistic Director until his death from AIDS in 1997. As a graduate student of musicology, Botto found that much of the medieval and Renaissance music he was studying was not being performed, and, because of this, he formed the group to perform this music with an all-male ensemble, as it was traditionally sung during the Renaissance.

Originally, the group contained ten singers, but its size has varied from eight to twelve. Currently, Chanticleer comprises twelve men, including two basses, one baritone, three tenors, and six countertenors (three altos and three sopranos).

The original members included Jim Armington (tenor), Ted Bakkila (baritone), Rob Bell (countertenor), Louis Botto (who sang alto as well as tenor), Sanford Dole (tenor), Kevin Freeman (bass), Tom Hart (baritone), Jonathan Klein (baritone), Neal Rogers (tenor), Tim Gibler (bass), Randall Wong (countertenor), and Doug Wyatt (bass). However, only ten of the singers were available to go on tour.

When the ensemble first became full-time in 1991, its members included Eric Alatorre (bass and longest-standing member as of his retirement after the 2018–2019 season), Frank Albinder (baritone), Kevin Baum (tenor), Mark Daniel (tenor), Kenneth Fitch (countertenor), Jonathan Goodman (tenor), Tim Gibler (bass and last member of the original ensemble), Joseph Jennings (countertenor and Music Director), Chad Runyon (baritone), Foster Sommerlad (countertenor), Matthew Thompson (tenor), and Philip Wilder (countertenor).

== Discography ==
- 1988 – The Anniversary Album, 1978–1988
- 1990 – Our Heart's Joy: A Chanticleer Christmas (remastered in 2004)
- 1991 – Psallite! A Renaissance Christmas
- 1992 – Josquin: Missa Mater Patris; Agricola: Magnificat and motets
- 1993 – Byrd: Missa In Tempore Paschali
- 1993 – Cristóbal de Morales: Missa Mille Regretz and motets
- 1993 – Mysteria: Gregorian Chants
- 1994 – Where the Sun Will Never Go Down
- 1994 – Out of This World
- 1994 – Palestrina: Missa pro defunctis; motets
- 1994 – Mexican Baroque
- 1994 – Our Heart's Joy / A Chanticleer Christmas
- 1995 – Sing We Christmas
- 1996 – Old-fashioned Christmas
- 1996 – Lost in the Stars
- 1998 – Wondrous Love: A World Folk Song Collection
- 1998 – Byrd: Music for a Hidden Chapel
- 1997 – Reflections
- 1998 – Jerusalem: Matins for the Virgin of Guadalupe, 1764
- 1999 – The Music of
- 1999 – Colors of Love, works by Augusta Read Thomas, Steven Stucky, John Tavener and Bernard Rands.
- 2000 – Magnificat, works by Josquin Desprez, Giovanni Palestrina, Tomás Luis de Victoria, John Taverner, William Cornysh, Vasily Polikarpovich Titov and Claudio Monteverdi
- 2001 – Glory to Christmas
- 2001 – Christmas with Chanticleer
- 2002 – John Tavener: Lamentations and Praises
- 2002 – Our American Journey
- 2003 – Evening Prayer: Purcell Anthems and Sacred Songs
- 2003 – A Portrait
- 2004 – How Sweet the Sound: Spirituals and Traditional Gospel Music, arrangements by Joseph Jennings
- 2004 – Music for a Hidden Chapel
- 2005 – Sound in Spirit, works by Carlos Rafael Rivera, Joseph Jennings, Victoria, Alfonso X of Castile, Jan Gilbert, Patricia Van Ness, Nectarie Vlahul, Sarah Hopkins, Giacinto Scelsi and Jackson Hill
- 2007 – And on Earth, Peace: A Chanticleer Mass
- 2007 – Let it Snow
- 2008 – Mission Road
- 2009 – I Have Had Singing: A Chanticleer Portrait
- 2010 – A Chanticleer Christmas
- 2011 – Our Favorite Carols
- 2011 – Between Two Wars
- 2011 – Chanticleer Takes You Out of this World!
- 2011 – For Thy Soul's Salvation
- 2011 – Jean-Yves Daniel-Lesur: Annunciation
- 2011 – Ludus Paschalis: Resurrection Play of Tours
- 2011 – My Chanticleer: A Collection for Chanticleer
- 2011 – The Boy Whose Father was God
- 2011 – With a Poet's Eye
- 2012 – Love Story
- 2012 – By Request
- 2013 – The Siren's Call
- 2013 – Someone New
- 2014 – She Said/He Said
- 2015 – Over the Moon
- 2017 – Heart of a Soldier
- 2018 – Then and There, Here and Now
- 2020 – Chanticleer Sings Christmas

In May 2007, Chanticleer released "And On Earth, Peace: A Chanticleer Mass" (Warner Classics) a new mass written by five contemporary composers. Israeli-born composer Shulamit Ran wrote the Credo to the Hebrew text "Ani Ma'amin"; US composer Douglas Cuomo contributed the Kyrie; Turkish-American composer Kamran Ince composed the Gloria section to a sufi text; English composer Ivan Moody composed the Sanctus; and Irish composer Michael McGlynn (director of Anúna) composed the Agnus Dei. The Mass was premiered in performance at the Metropolitan Museum of Art in New York City and was followed by six performances throughout the San Francisco Bay area.

On October 16, 2007, Chanticleer released "Let it Snow," the group's 29th recording. A portion of the album is accompanied by orchestra and/or big band; as such, the album brings a new sound to Chanticleer's almost exclusively a cappella repertoire.

== Notable past members ==
- Frank Albinder (baritone), designed the concept and chose the repertoire for Chanticleer's Grammy Award-winning album Colors of Love
- Philip Wilder
- Matt Alber
- Terry Barber

== Awards and honors ==
Joseph Jennings (as artistic director) and Chanticleer won a Grammy Award for Best Small Ensemble Performance for their 1999 recording Colors of Love. Chanticleer was awarded two Grammy Awards, in categories Best Small Ensemble Performance and Best Classical Contemporary Composition, their 2002 recording of Taverner's Lamentations and Praises. Their 2003 recording Our American Journey was nominated for a Grammy a year later.

In November 2007, in its 30th anniversary season, Chanticleer was named Musical America's 2008 Ensemble of the year. This marks the first time a vocal ensemble has received this award. Additionally, on October 9, 2008, Chanticleer became the first vocal ensemble to be inducted into the American Classical Music Hall of Fame in Cincinnati, Ohio.

In 2025, Chanticleer's 2002 album Our American Journey was selected by the Library of Congress for preservation in the National Recording Registry.
