= Randall Thompson =

American composer and educator (1899–1984)

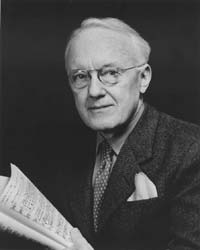
- Born: Ira Randall Thompson; April 21, 1899; New York City
- Died: July 9, 1984 (aged 85); Boston, Massachusetts
- Resting place: Mount Auburn Cemetery, Cambridge, Massachusetts; 42.3701°N 71.1445°W
- Education: His teachers included A.T. Davidson, Edward Burlingame Hill and Walter Spalding at Harvard; Ernest Bloch in New York; and Gian Francesco Malipiero in Asolo, Italy as a Prix de Rome winner.
- Known for: choral composition
- Spouse: Margaret Quayle Whitney
- Children: 4
- Relatives: Daniel Varney Thompson, Jr., brother

Ira Randall Thompson (April 21, 1899 – July 9, 1984) was an American composer, particularly noted for his choral works, and educator.

== Career ==
Thompson attended The Lawrenceville School, where his father was an English teacher. He then attended Harvard University, studying under A.T. Davison, Edward Burlingame Hill, and Walter Spalding; in New York he studied privately with composer Ernest Bloch.

He later became an assistant professor of music and choir director at Wellesley College, and received a doctorate in music from the University of Rochester's Eastman School of Music. He went on to teach at the Curtis Institute of Music (serving as its Director 1941/1942), at the University of Virginia, and at Harvard University. He is particularly noted for his choral works. He was an honorary member of the Rho Tau chapter of Phi Mu Alpha Sinfonia fraternity at Appalachian State University.

Thompson composed three symphonies and numerous vocal works including Americana, The Testament of Freedom, Frostiana, and The Peaceable Kingdom, inspired by Edward Hicks's painting. His most popular and recognizable choral work is his anthem, Alleluia, commissioned by Serge Koussevitzky for the opening of the Berkshire Music Center at Tanglewood. He also wrote the operas Solomon and Balkis and The Nativity According to St. Luke.

Americana, a song cycle, is written in a 20th-century musical art style known as "News Items"—compositions that parody newspaper layout and content, or whose lyrics are lifted from media of the day. The lyrics are lifted from the "Americana" section of H. L. Mencken's American Mercury magazine, which would reprint quotes and stories from U.S. publications. The song cycle's texts come from such publications as the Seattle, Washington, Post-Intelligencer, the Little Rock, Arkansas, Gazette, and a leaflet issued by the National Women's Christian Temperance Union.

Leonard Bernstein was one of Thompson's students both at Harvard and at Curtis, according to his own testimony in a speech he gave at Curtis Institute's 75th Anniversary Banquet. Thompson's other notable students include Samuel Adler, Leo Kraft, Juan Orrego-Salas, John Davison, Thomas Beveridge, Charles Edward Hamm, George Lynn, William P. Perry, Christopher King, Joel Cohen, Frederic Rzewski, Richard Edward Wilson, John Walter Hill, and David Borden.

In honor of Thompson's vast influence on male choral music, on May 2, 1964, he became the first recipient of the prestigious University of Pennsylvania Glee Club Award of Merit. Established in 1964, this award sought "to bring a declaration of appreciation to an individual each year that has made a significant contribution to the world of music and helped to create a climate in which our talents may find valid expression." He was also a recipient of Yale University's Sanford Medal.

== Works ==
=== Choral works ===
- The Last Invocation (1922)
- Odes of Horace (1924)
- Pueri Hebraeorum (1928)
- Americana (1932)
- The Peaceable Kingdom (1936) – inspired by the painting by Edward Hicks and based on texts chosen from Isaiah
- Tarantella (1937) – on text by Hilaire Belloc
- Alleluia (1940)
- The Testament of Freedom (1943) – texts from Thomas Jefferson
- The Last Words of David (1949)
- Mass of the Holy Spirit (1955)
- Ode to the Virginian Voyage (1956)
- Requiem – A Dramatic Dialogue (1958)
- Glory to God in the Highest (1958)
- Frostiana: Seven Country Songs (1959) – a setting of poems by Robert Frost
- The Best of Rooms (1963) – based on text by Robert Herrick
- A Feast of Praise (1963) – based on biblical texts
- A Psalm of Thanksgiving (1967)
- Place of the Blest (1968) – based on texts by Robert Herrick and Richard Wilbur
- Bitter-Sweet (1970)
- A Concord Cantata (1975) – secular cantata based on texts by Edward Everett Hale, Allen French and Robert Frost
- The Twelve Canticles (1983) – Thompson's last composition – Dedicated to the Emory and Henry College Concert Choir – Based on eleven of Thompson's favorite passages from the Bible
- The Passion According to St. Luke, commissioned for the 150th anniversary of the Handel and Haydn Society
- The Nativity According to St. Luke
- Velvet Shoes

=== Operas ===
- Solomon and Balkis

=== Symphonies ===
- Symphony No. 1 (1931)
- Symphony No. 2 (1931)
- Symphony No. 3 (1947–49)

=== String quartets ===
- Quartet No. 1 in D minor (1941)
- Quartet No. 2 in G major (1967)
