= The Crossing (choral ensemble) =

American chamber choir, conducted by Donald Nally

- Choir
- Founded: 2005
- Members: Walter Aldrich, Carl Alexander, Dario Amador-Lage, Nathaniel Barnett, Jessica Beebe, Kelly Bixby, Karen Blanchard, Steven Bradshaw, Aryssa Burrs, Tyrone Clinton, Matthew Cramer, Colin Dill, Micah Dingler, Ryan Fleming, Joanna Gates, Dimitri German, Sam Grosby, Michael Hawes, Michaël Hudetz, Steven Hyder, Michael Jones, Lauren Kelly, Zachary Kurzenberger, Anika Kildegaard, Chelsea Lyons, Andrew Major, Victoria Marshall, Hannah McConnell, Elijah McCormack, Jenna Hernandez McLean, Maren Montalbano, Rebecca Myers, Daniel O'Dea, Benjamin Perri, Olivia Prendergast, Jack Reeder, James Reese, Daniel Schwartz, Thann Scoggin, Rebecca Siler, Tiana Sorenson, Daniel Spratlan, Elisa Sutherland, Daniel Taylor, Jackson Williams, Shari Wilson; Kevin Vondrak, associate conductor; John Grecia, keyboards; Scott Dettra, organist
- Chief conductor: Donald Nally
- Headquarters: Philadelphia, Pennsylvania, United States
- Label: Innova Recordings, Albany Records, Navona Records, Cantaloupe Music, ECM Records
- Website: crossingchoir.org

The Crossing
- Years active: 2005–present

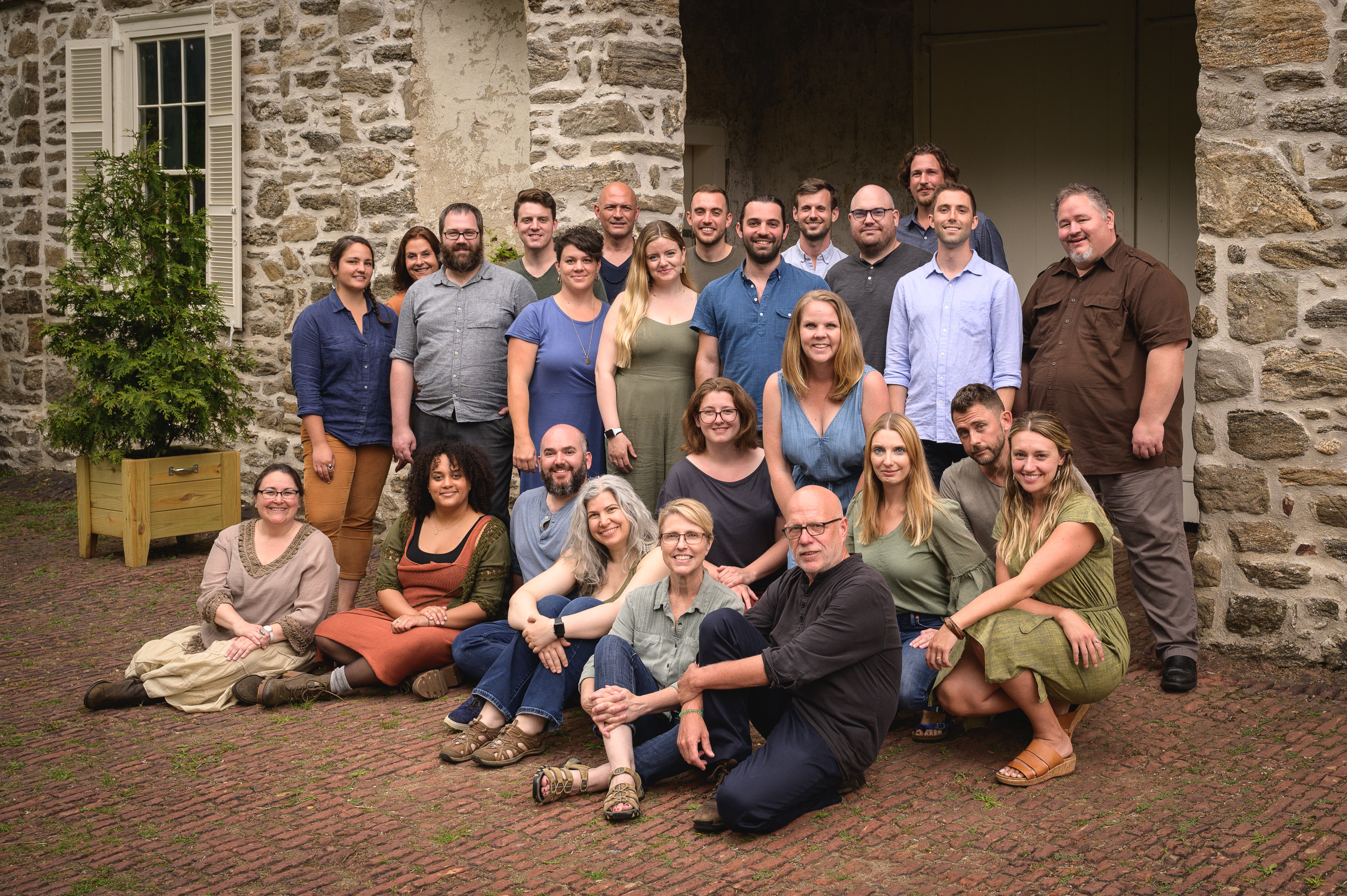
The Crossing, 2021 (credit: John C. Hawthorne)

The Crossing is an American professional chamber choir, conducted by Donald Nally and based in Philadelphia, Pennsylvania. It focuses on new music, commission and premiere works, and collaborates with various venues and instrumental ensembles.

== History ==
Formed by a group of friends in 2005, the ensemble has since grown and according to The New York Times in 2014, "has made a name for itself in recent years as a champion of new music". It focuses on new music, commissioning most of what it sings, and collaborates with venues and instrumental ensembles internationally.

The choir was the resident choir of the Spoleto Festival, Italy, in 2007; appeared at Miller Theatre of Columbia University in the American premiere of James Dillon's Nine Rivers with the International Contemporary Ensemble (ICE); joined Bang on a Can's first Philadelphia Marathon; and has appeared with the American Composers Orchestra, Network for New Music, Quicksilver Baroque, Lyric Fest, Piffaro, red fish blue fish, Tempesta di Mare Baroque Chamber Orchestra, PRISM Saxophone Quartet, Toshimaru Nakamura, Dolce Suono, and in the summer of 2013, The Rolling Stones.

The ensemble has sung in venues including the Walt Disney Concert Hall, The Kennedy Center, Carnegie Hall, and the Metropolitan Museum of Art; it made its Lincoln Center debut in July 2014 in a world premiere of a composition by John Luther Adams in a collaboration with the Mostly Mozart Festival, the Lincoln Center Out of Doors Festival, eighth blackbird, JACK Quartet, and TILT Brass.

The choir frequently commissions works and has presented over 70 world premieres. Projects for the 2017-18 season include commissions with Michael Gilbertson, Aaron Helgeson, Benjamin C.S. Boyle, and Kile Smith.

The ensemble records extensively and has released ten recordings on various labels: Innova Recordings, Navona Records, Albany Records, ECM Records, and Cantaloupe Music. Its recording of Thomas Lloyd's Bonhoeffer was nominated for Best Choral Performance for the 59th Grammy Awards.

The choir is the recipient of three ASCAP Awards for Adventurous Programming as well as the Dale Warland Singers Commission Award from Chorus America; conductor Donald Nally also received the 2012 Louis Botto Award for Innovative Action and Entrepreneurial Zeal and the 2017 Michael Korn Founders Award for Development of the Professional Choral Art for his work with the ensemble.

In December 2014, the ensemble began a collaboration with visual artists Allora & Calzadilla in their largest U.S. exhibition to date, Intervals, at the Perelman Building at the Philadelphia Museum of Art and The Fabric Workshop and Museum. This included over 300 performances of David Lang's Lifespan as well as monthly performances of In the Midst of Things, a fifteen-minute unaccompanied re-imagining of moments from Franz Joseph Haydn's The Creation (1798).

In June 2016, the organization launched an ambitious commissioning project called Seven Responses, the purpose of which was to perform Dieterich Buxtehude's Membra Jesu Nostri (BuxWV 75) juxtaposed with commissioned responses by Caroline Shaw, Hans Thomalla, Pelle Gudmundsen-Holmgreen, Anna Thorvaldsdottir. David T. Little, Santa Ratniece, and Lewis Spratlan, in collaboration with Quicksilver Baroque and International Contemporary Ensemble. The two-day program was premiered at the Philadelphia Episcopal Cathedral and later reprised at Merkin Concert Hall as a part of the 2016 Mostly Mozart Festival in Lincoln Center.

=== Month of Moderns ===
In 2009, the ensemble established an annual festival, held in the early summer, consisting of several new-music concerts in one month, with commissioned works based on a central theme tying the entire festival together.

The theme for Month of Moderns 2009 was The Celan Project, works based on the poetry of Paul Celan.

Month of Moderns 2010 featured The Levine Project, works based on or inspired by the words of Pulitzer-Prize winner and U.S. Poet Laureate Philip Levine. "Seneca Sounds" was the focus for Month of Moderns 2011, with works based on the words and philosophy of Seneca the Younger.

Month of Moderns 2012 was centered on Modern Vespers, works fashioned after the ancient evening prayer service, cast in modern themes and musical languages.

A much larger project, The Gulf (Between You and Me), based on a three-part commissioned poem by Pierre Joris inspired by the Deep Water Horizon disaster in the Gulf of Mexico, dominated Month of Moderns 2013.

Month of Moderns 2014 included five major commissioned world premieres loosely based around Novalis's poem Astralis questioning our existence and eternity.

After 2014, the ensemble moved away from a theme solely surrounding the Month of Moderns alone and more towards a theme for each season. The Month of Moderns festival continues to be a signature part of the organization's season, regardless of theme, with each concert featuring at least one or more world premiere.

=== Death of co-founder Jeffrey Dinsmore ===
In April 2014, Crossing co-founder Jeffrey Dinsmore died at age 42; he was preparing for a rehearsal with The Crossing and the Los Angeles Philharmonic at Disney Hall. The ensemble subsequently established The Jeffrey Dinsmore Memorial Fund.

The Crossing later commissioned 15 composers who had a connection with Mr. Dinsmore to write short quartets to be published in a printed omnibus. The ensemble gave the world premiere of those works on July 8, 2016 in Philadelphia.

=== Big Sky Choral Initiative ===
In the summer of 2015, The Crossing partnered with the Warren Miller Performing Arts Center in Big Sky, Montana, to offer a week-long fellowship intensive for students of composition and choral singing. In 2017, the program expanded to two weeks, offering educational opportunities to conducting fellows as well. Composing, conducting, and singing fellows interact with members of The Crossing on a daily basis, exploring, writing, and singing new music throughout the week. The Big Sky Choral Initiative continued its creative journey with a new paradigm in 2018, collaborating with Michael Gordon and filmmaker Bill Morrison to create a new work specific to this unique gathering at Big Sky. The work draws on the land of Montana - its history, beauty, struggles, and expanse - as inspiration for this hour-long work for unaccompanied choir and film.

=== Commissioned world premieres ===
- Kinan Abou-Afach: Of Nights and Solace (commissioned by Al-Bustan Seeds of Culture in collaboration with The Crossing, 2015)
- John Luther Adams: Sila: The Breath of the World (commissioned by Mostly Mozart and Lincoln Center) (2014)
- John Luther Adams: Canticles of the Holy Wind (2013)
- Louis Andriessen: Ahania Weeping (Jeff Quartets 2016)
- Benjamin C.S. Boyle: Voyages (Month of Moderns 2018)
- Benjamin C.S. Boyle: Empire of Crystal (Jeff Quartets 2016)
- Benjamin C.S. Boyle: Three Carols of Wintertide: Lo, How a Rose E'er Blooming (2006)
- Benjamin C.S. Boyle: Lamentations of Jeremiah: Beth (2005)
- Kirsten Broberg: Breathturn (The Celan Project 2009)
- William Brooks: For Orpheus (Jeff Quartets, 2016)
- William Brooks: Six Mediaeval Lyrics (choral version) (2011)
- Gregory W. Brown: un/bodying/s (Month of Moderns 2016)
- Gavin Bryars: The Fifth Century (in collaboration with PRISM Saxophone Quartet) (Month of Moderns 2014)
- Gavin Bryars: A Native Hill (Dec 2018 Version)
- Gavin Bryars: A Native Hill (2019)
- Curt Cacioppo: Vermillion Vespers (2011)
- Hunter Chang: Alone (2018)
- Nicholas Cline: the gentle rain which waters (2018)
- Gene Coleman: The Gulf (Month of Moderns 2013)
- Robert Convery: The Beautiful Land of Nod (Jeff Quartets 2016)
- Robert Convery: My Hand In Yours, So (2019)
- Ēriks Ešenvalds: Translation (Jeff Quartets 2016)
- Ēriks Ešenvalds: Seneca's Zodiac (Seneca Sounds 2011)
- Luis Fernando Amaya: Dialectos de arbol- Discursos 1-3 (2018)
- Paul Fowler: First Pink (Jeff Quartets 2016)
- Paul Fowler: Echoes (2011)
- Paul Fowler: Breath (The Levine Project 2010)
- Paul Fowler: Obligations (2021)
- Andrew Gant: What Child Is This? (SATB version) (2007)
- Michael Gilbertson (composer) Born (2017)
- Michael Gordon: Montaña 2017-20
- Michael Gordon: Anonymous Man (Month of Moderns 2016)
- Michael Gordon: Montaña (Part 1: To the West) (2018)
- Judd Greenstein: My City (commissioned by American Composers Orchestra 2015)
- Pelle Gudmundsen-Holmgreen: Ad Cor (Seven Responses 2016)
- Hunter Hanson: Sea or Seam (2018)
- Ted Hearne: Animals (2018)
- Ted Hearne: What it might say (Jeff Quartets 2016)
- Ted Hearne: Sound from the Bench (co-commission with Volti) (Month of Moderns 2014)
- Aaron Helgeson: A way far home (2016)
- Edie Hill: Spectral Spirits (2019)
- Bo Holten: A Jeff Quartet for 4 Voices(Jeff Quartets 2016)
- Kamran Ince: Thyestes (Seneca Sounds 2011)
- Gabriel Jackson: According to Seneca (Seneca Sounds 2011)
- Gabriel Jackson: Rigwreck (Month of Moderns 2013)
- Gabriel Jackson: Yes, I am your Angel (Jeff Quartets 2016)
- Gabriel Jackson: Self Portrait in Charleston, Orlando (2019)
- Chris Jonas: The Gulf (Month of Moderns 2013)
- Amy Beth Kirsten: Strange Pilgrims (2014)
- David Lang: i live in pain (2011)
- David Lang: Lifespan (collaboration on Allora & Calzadilla exhibit Intervals) (2014)
- David Lang: Statement to the Court (The Levine Project 2010)
- David Lang: make peace (Jeff Quartets 2016)
- David Lang: Spit Spreads Death (2019)
- David Lang: protect yourself from infection (2020)
- David Lang: in nature (2020)
- David Lang: the sense of senses (2021)
- David T. Little: dress in magic amulets, dark, from My feet (Seven Responses 2016)
- Thomas Lloyd: In Your Light (2019)
- Thomas Lloyd: Bonhoeffer (2013)
- Ellis Ludqig-Leone: Who What Where Why (and a few other questions) (2018)
- Robert Maggio: The Woman Where We Are Living (for inaugural The Crossing/Knight Foundation Composition Competition) (Month of Moderns 2014)
- Robert Maggio: Aniara: fragments of time and space (2019)
- Robert Maggio: Democracy (2020)
- Lansing McLoskey: Zealot Canticles (2017)
- Lansing McLoskey: Dear World (Jeff Quartets 2016)
- Lansing McLoskey: The Memory of Rain (The Levine Project 2010)
- Stratis Minakakis: Crossings (2015, with additional Epigrams premiered in Month of Moderns 2017)
- Donald Nally: You can Plan on Me (2020)
- Francis Pott (composer): A Time for Every Thing (Month of Moderns 2012)
- James Primosch: Carthage (2018)
- James Primosch: Mass for the Day of St. Thomas Didymus (for inaugural The Crossing/Knight Foundation Composition Competition) (Month of Moderns 2014)
- Joel Puckett: I enter the earth (Month of Moderns 2015)
- David Shapiro: Sumptuous Planet (Jeff Quartets 2016)
- David Shapiro: The Years from You to Me (The Celan Project 2010)
- David Shapiro: It Is Time (The Celan Project 2009)
- David Shapiro: Et incarnatus est (2007)
- Caroline Shaw: To the Hands (Seven Responses 2016)
- Kile Smith: The Arc in the Sky (2018)
- Kile Smith: You are Most Welcome (Jeff Quartets 2016)
- Kile Smith: May Day (The J.S. Jenks School 2015)
- Kile Smith: The Consolation of Apollo (2014)
- Kile Smith: The Waking Sun (Seneca Sounds 2011)
- Kile Smith: Where Flames a Word (The Celan Project 2009)
- Kile Smith: Vespers (commissioned by Piffaro, The Renaissance Band in collaboration with The Crossing) (2008)
- Gregory Spears: The Tower and the Garden (2018)
- Santa Ratniece: My soul will sink within me (Seven Responses 2016)
- Santa Ratniece: Thousand Waves (Jeff Quartets 2016)
- Matana Roberts: we got time (2021)
- Christopher Rountree: In the midst of things (collaboration on Allora & Calzadilla exhibit Intervals) (2014)
- Kareem Roustom: Embroidered Verses (commissioned by Al-Bustan Seeds of Culture in collaboration with The Crossing, 2015)
- Toivo Tulev: I Heard the Voices of Children (2019)
- Zachary Wadsworth: Gabriel's Message (2011)
- Lu Wang: At which point (2021)
- Julia Wolfe: fire in my mouth (2019)
- Ayanna Woods: Shift (2020)
- Ayanna Woods: Refrain (2021)
- Kevin Vondrak & Donald Nally: The Forest (2020)

=== U.S. premieres ===
- James Dillon: Nine Rivers
- Ēriks Ešenvalds: Sun Dogs
- Ēriks Ešenvalds: Long Road
- Dai Fujikura: Zawazawa
- Pelle Gudmundsen-Holmgreen: Examples
- Pelle Gudmundsen-Holmgreen: Statements
- Jonathan Harvey: The Dove Descending
- Frank Havrøy: Psalm
- Frank Havrøy: Tre folketoner
- Bo Holten: A Time for Everything
- Gabriel Jackson: Ane Sang of the Birth of Christ
- Gabriel Jackson: Ave regina caelorum
- Justė Janulytė: Aguarelle
- Erhard Karkoschka: Vier kleine Finalsätze zu "Es ist ein Schnitter, heisst der Tod"
- Erhard Karkoschka: Variationen mit Celan-Gedichten III
- Tõnu Kõrvits: Hymns from the Western Coast
- Philip Moore: I Saw Him Standing
- Henrik Ødegaard: Rorate caeli
- Francis Pott: My Song Is Love Unknown
- Santa Ratniece: Chu dal
- Santa Ratniece: Horo Horo Hata Hata
- Santa Ratniece: Saline
- Kaija Saariaho: Tag des Jahrs
- Asbjørn Schaathun: Verklärung
- Salvatore Sciarrino: Responsorio delle Tenebre
- Paul Spicer: How Love Bleeds
- Anna Thorvaldsdottir: Heyr þú oss himnum á
- Anna Thorvaldsdottir: Heyr mig mín sál
- Toivo Tulev: And Then in Silence There with Me Be Only You
- Toivo Tulev: Rejoice! Rejoice! Rejoice!
- Eric Whitacre: Sainte-Chapelle

=== Major performances ===
- National Conference of Chorus America – Opening Concert, Philadelphia, June 2009
- Month of Moderns 2009: Jody Talbot's Path of Miracles (multi-media)
- Crossing @ Winter 2010: Regional premiere of David Lang's The Little Match Girl Passion (2008 Pulitzer Prize); additional performances at the Metropolitan Museum of Art, December 2012 and 2013
- Miller Theatre at Columbia University at the invitation of the theatre and the International Contemporary Ensemble (ICE) - U.S. premiere of James Dillon's three-evening Nine Rivers, September 2011
- Carnegie Hall: world premiere of strange pilgrims by Amy Beth Kirstein with American Composers Orchestra, February 2014
- Disney Hall with the Los Angeles Philharmonic: West Coast premiere of Louis Andriessen's De Materie, April 2014
- Kennedy Center for the Performing Arts live webcast with Eric Whitacre at the invitation of the Kennedy Center and Chorus America, June 2014
- Lincoln Center: world premiere of Sila: The Breath of the World by John Luther Adams in a collaboration with the Mostly Mozart Festival, the Lincoln Center Out of Doors Festival, eighth blackbird, JACK Quartet, and TILT Brass, July 2014
- Winter Garden at Brookfield Place: world premiere of My City by Judd Greenstein with American Composers Orchestra and DM Stith, October 2015
- Merkin Hall: NY premiere of Seven Responses by Caroline Shaw, Hans Thomalla, Pelle Gudmundsen-Holmgreen, Anna Thorvaldsdottir. David T. Little, Santa Ratniece, and Lewis Spratlan, in collaboration with Quicksilver Baroque and International Contemporary Ensemble, August 2016
- Big Ears Festival: works of Gavin Bryars, Ted Hearne, and David Lang, March 2017
- David Geffen Hall: World premiere of Fire in my mouth by Julia Wolfe with Young People’s Chorus of New York City and the New York Philharmonic, Jaap van Zweden conducting, January 2019

=== Awards ===
- Chorus America/ASCAP Award for Adventurous Programming 2009, 2011, and 2017
- Dale Warland Singers Commissioning Award from Chorus America 2013
- Champion of New Music Award from American Composers Forum 2017
- Ensemble of the Year from Musical America 2024

==== Grammy Nominations and Awards ====
- Nomination - 2026 Grammy Award for Best Choral Performance for poor hymnal
- 2025 Grammy Award for Best Choral Performance for Ochre
- Nomination - 2024 Grammy Award for Best Choral Performance for Carols After a Plague
- 2023 Grammy Award for Best Choral Performance for Born
- Nomination - 2022 Grammy Award for Best Choral Performance for Rising w/ The Crossing
- Nomination - 2021 Grammy Award for Best Choral Performance for Carthage
- Nomination - 2020 Grammy Award for Best Choral Performance for The Arc in the Sky

https://www.navonarecords.com/catalog/nv6218/* Nomination - 2020 Grammy Award for Best Choral Performance for Voyages

- Nomination - 2020 Grammy Award for Best Engineered Album, Classical for Fire in My Mouth
- 2019 Grammy Award for Best Choral Performance for Zealot Canticles
- 2018 Grammy Award for Best Choral Performance for The Fifth Century
- Nomination - 2017 Grammy Award for Best Choral Performance for Bonhoeffer

=== Discography ===
- David Lang, Poor Hymnal, The Crossing (Cantaloupe Records, 2024)
- Meciendo, The Crossing (Navona Records, 2024)
- Ways You Went, The Crossing (Navona Records, 2024)
- Ochre, The Crossing (Navona Records, 2024); 2024 Grammy Nominated
- Motion Studies, The Crossing (Navona Records, 2024)
- David Shapiro, Sumptuous Planet, The Crossing (New Focus Recordings, 2023)
- Titration, The Crossing (Navona Records, 2023)
- Carols After a Plague, The Crossing (New Focus Recordings, 2022)
- Tyondai Braxton, Telekinesis, The Crossing with Metropolis Ensemble (New Amsterdam/Nonesuch, 2022)
- John Luther Adams, Sila: The Breath of the World, The Crossing with JACK Quartet (Cantaloupe Music, 2022)
- Born, The Crossing (Navona Records, 2022); 2023 Grammy Award for Best Choral Performance
- Words Adorned, The Crossing with Dalal Abu Amneh and Al-Bustan Takht Ensemble (Navona Records, 2021)
- The Tower and the Garden (Navona Records, 2021)
- Rising w/ The Crossing (New Focus Recordings, 2020)
- James Primosch, Carthage, The Crossing (Navona Records, 2020)
- Michael Gordon, Anonymous Man (Cantaloupe Music, 2020)
- Julia Wolfe, Fire in my mouth, The Crossing with New York Philharmonic and Young People's Chorus of New York City (Decca Gold, 2019)
- Voyages (Innova Records, 2019)
- Kile Smith, The Arc in the Sky (Navona Records, 2019)
- Evolutionary Spirits, The Crossing (Navona Records, 2019)
- Lansing McLoskey, Zealot Canticles (Innova Records, 2018);2019 Grammy Award for Best Choral Performance
- Gregory Brown and Stratis Minakakis, If There Were Water, (Innova Records, 2018)
- John Luther Adams, Canticles of the Holy Wind, (Cantaloupe Music, 2017)
- Ted Hearne, Sound from the Bench, (Cantaloupe Music, 2017)
- Edie Hill, Clay Jug, (Navona Records, 2016)
- Seven Responses, The Crossing with International Contemporary Ensemble (Innova Records, 2016)
- Gavin Bryars, The Fifth Century, PRISM Saxophone Quartet and The Crossing (ECM Records, 2016); 2018 Grammy Award for Best Choral Performance
- Thomas Lloyd, Bonhoeffer, The Crossing (Albany Records, 2016); Grammy-nominated in the category of Best Choral Performance, 2017
- Words Adorned, The Crossing with Dalal Abu Amneh and Al-Bustan Takht Ensemble (2015)
- Gregory W Brown: Moonstrung Air, The Crossing, New York Polyphony (Navona Records, 2015) Archived August 4, 2017, at the Wayback Machine
- Lewis Spratlan, Hesperus is Phosphorus, Network for New Music and The Crossing (Innova Records, 2015)
- Christmas Daybreak, The Crossing, The Choir of St. Paul's Church (Chestnut Hill) (Innova Records, 2013)
- I Want to Live, The Women of The Crossing (Innova Records, 2013)
- It Is Time, The Crossing (Navona Records, 2011)
- Kile Smith, Vespers, Piffaro, The Renaissance Band and The Crossing (Navona Records, 2008)
