= Aleksandra Vrebalov =

Serbian-American composer (born 1970)

Aleksandra Vrebalov (born September 22, 1970) is a Serbian-American composer based in New York City and Novi Sad, Serbia.

== Biography ==
Vrebalov was born in the former Yugoslavia and came to the United States for study in 1995. She became a U.S. citizen in 2015. Vrebalov studied composition with Miroslav Statkic at Novi Sad University, then with Zoran Erić at Belgrade University, Elinor Armer at the San Francisco Conservatory of Music, and Ivana Loudová at the Prague Academy of Music. She was Composition Fellow of the Tanglewood Music Center in summer 1999. Vrebalov earned her Doctor of Musical Arts degree from the University of Michigan where she studied with Evan Chambers and Michael Daugherty.

Aleksandra Vrebalov's more than 100 works range from concert music and opera to music for modern dance and film. Her music has been performed by the Kronos Quartet, Glimmerglass Opera with Cincinnati Opera, Serbian National Theater, English National Ballet, Rambert Dance, Sybarite5, Jorge Caballero, the Sausalito Quartet, ETHEL string quartet, Dušan Týnek Dance Theatre, Ijsbreker, Moravian Philharmonic, Belgrade Philharmonic Orchestra, and Festival Ballet Providence, among others. Vrebalov's cross-disciplinary interests led to participation at residencies and fellowships that include the MacDowell Colony, Djerassi Artists Residency, The Hermitage, New York's New Dramatists, Rockefeller Bellagio Center, American Opera Project, and the Other Minds Festival. Between 2007 and 2011, Vrebalov created and led Summer in Sombor (Serbia), a weeklong composition workshop with the South Oxford Six composers' collective that she co-founded in 2002 in New York City. The workshop facilitated the creation of over 50 new works by young composers from Europe and the U.S. For several years she has also worked with Müzikhane (House of Music), an organization founded by composer Sahba Aminikia in the Türkiye-Syrian border cities of Mardin and Nusaybin to engage in music making with young refugees from Syria and Iraq. Vrebalov is the recipient of the Golden Emblem from the Serbian Ministry of Foreign Affairs for lifelong dedication and contribution to her native country's culture.

Vrebalov received the Charles Ives Fellowship from the American Academy of Arts and Letters, the Hoefer Notable Alum Prize from the San Francisco Conservatory, a Fromm Music Foundation commission, a Barlow Endowment commission, and awards from the American Society of Composers, Authors and Publishers (ASCAP), American Music Center, Meet the Composer, MAP Fund, Vienna Modern Masters, and Friends and Enemies of New Music. As the Douglas Moore Fellow (2004), supported by the Columbia University's Alice Ditson Fund, she spent a season in the Glimmerglass Opera, Opera Memphis, and Florida Grand Opera, where she immersed herself in all aspects of opera production. Her opera Mileva (2011) had its world premiere at the 150th Anniversary season of the Serbian National Theater in Novi Sad. Her third opera, The Knock, a collaboration with playwright Deborah Brevoort, was co-commissioned by the Glimmerglass Festival and Cincinnati Opera. It was first produced as a film by Glimmerglass in 2021 and received its world premiere staged performance at Cincinnati Opera in June 2023. The opera's subject matter revolves around U.S. military wives awaiting news of their spouses during the conflict with Iraq in 2005. Vrebalov is a full time professor of composition at the Academy of Arts in Novi Sad; she previously taught at the City College of New York.

There are more than twenty CD releases containing Vrebalov's work, recorded for Nonesuch, Cantaloupe, Innova, Orange Music Mountain, New Amsterdam, Centaur Records, and Vienna Modern Masters.

Vrebalov's orchestral works include commissions for the Seattle Youth Symphony Orchestra, This Kiss for the Whole World, inspired by Beethoven's Ninth Symphony and premiered in 2022; Our Voices (2019), for "surround orchestra" deployed throughout the audience and including a virtual reality component by artist Derek Ham; the multipart Sea Ranch Songs (2019), inspired by Sea Ranch, California; her accordion concerto Forgotten Anthems IV (2018), composed for Goran Stevanovic, Orbits (2002), and Times (1996), which received the Vienna Modern Masters Award. Her music for the ballet The Widow's Broom (2004) based on Chris Van Allsburg's book of the same title, has been performed on Halloween by the Festival Ballet Providence.

Beginning with her String Quartet No. 2 in 1997, Vrebalov has maintained an especially fruitful relationship with the Kronos Quartet, resulting in 20 works to date including three commissioned for the group by New York's Carnegie Hall: ...hold me, neighbor, in this storm..., My Desert, My Rose, and iletrikés rímes. My Desert, My Rose was commissioned as part of the quartet's "Fifty for the Future" initiative. Further Kronos collaborations include her Gold Came from Space, composed for the quartet's 50th anniversary and premiered in Washington, DC, in November 2023; Missa Supratext, written for Kronos and the San Francisco Girls Chorus and premiered at the Kronos Festival in April 2018 the Sea Ranch Songs (2017) with a film by Andrew Lyndon; Beyond Zero: 1914–1918, a collaboration with filmmaker Bill Morrison, and Babylon, Our Own (2011), composed for Kronos with clarinetist David Krakauer.

Vrebalov's Antennae (2019/2021) is one of several works featuring Serbian monks led by Hierotheos (now Bishop Jerotej of Šabac). The piece, commissioned by the Cleveland Museum of Art and inspired by the museum's holdings of Byzantine art and icons, is one of many rooted in the composer's Serbian heritage. These also include her string quartets Pannonia Boundless, ...hold me neighbor, in this storm..., the opera Mileva, and many others. She sometimes uses what might be called archival or archeological elements in her work, whether through stylistic mimicry or direct quotation of folk materials or the Western classical music tradition or through incorporation of pre-recorded materials, such as the church bells and Islamic calls for prayer in ...hold me, neighbor... and the Byzantine chant of Antennae. Following research in rural China in 2016, Vrebalov composed two works for traditional Chinese instruments, Cosmic Love III and Light Codes, for the Forbidden City Chamber Orchestra and conductor Liu Shun. Further, Vrebalov experiments with open-form and graphic scores (e.g., her echolocations and soundshapes) exploring the effects of performers' artistic individuality and intuition. Open-form aspects also inform some of her more fully noted works, including My Desert, My Rose. In recent years, she has used visual art as an expressive medium to sketch and reflect upon her musical work.
