= Martin Bresnick =

American classical composer

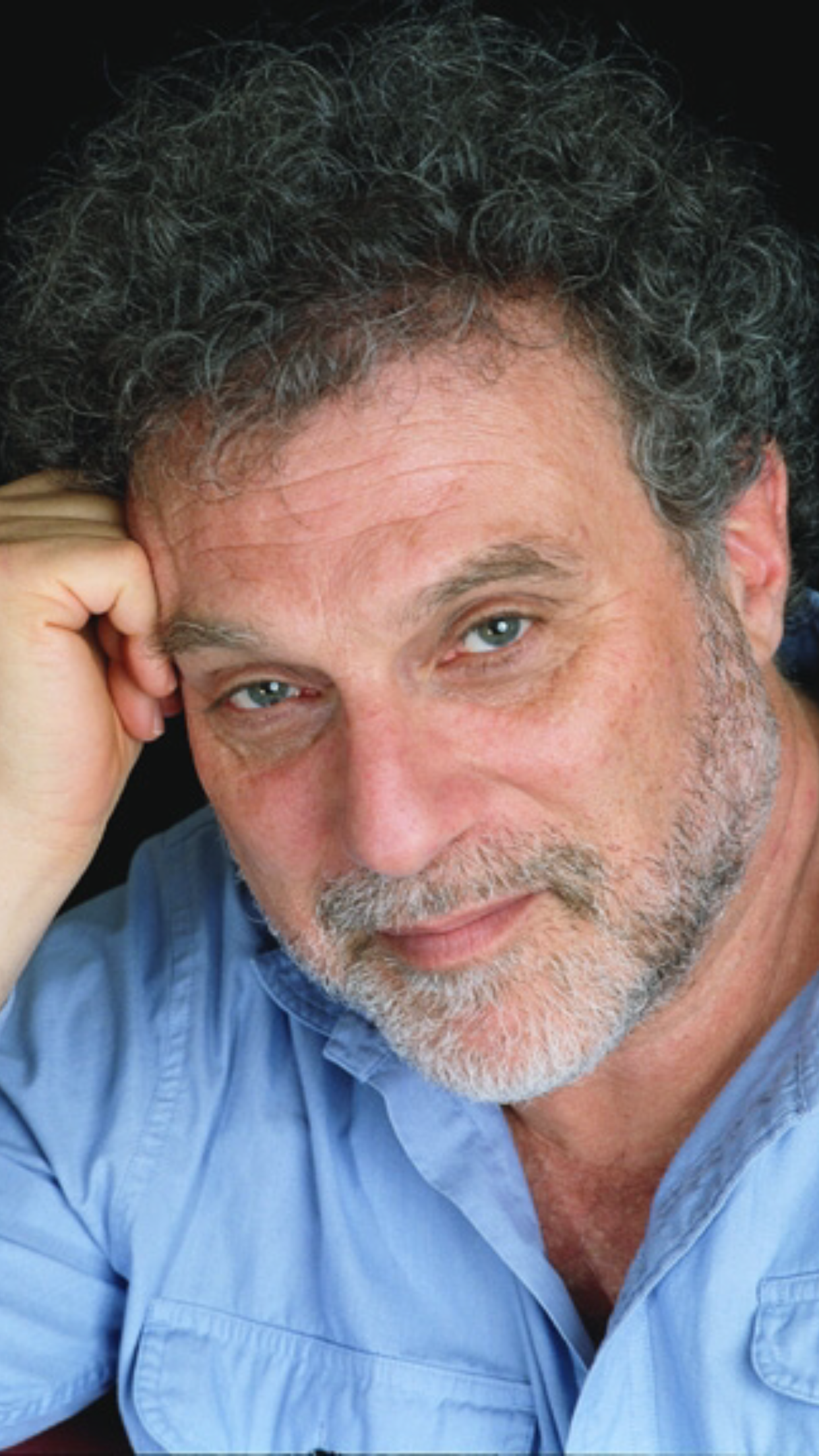
Composer Martin Bresnick

Martin Bresnick (born 1946) is a composer of contemporary classical music, film scores and experimental music.

== Education and early career ==
Bresnick grew up in the Bronx, and is a graduate of New York City's specialized High School of Music and Art. He was educated at the University of Hartford (B.A. '67), Stanford University (M.A. '68, D.M.A. '72), and the Akademie für Musik, Vienna ('69–'70), and studied composition with John Chowning, György Ligeti and Gottfried von Einem. He went on to teach at the San Francisco Conservatory of Music, Stanford University and the Yale School of Music.

== Career ==
Bresnick’s work has received many prizes, among them: Fulbright Fellowship (1969–70), three NEA Composer Grants (1974, 1979, 1990), Rome Prize Fellowship (1975–76), MacDowell Fellowship (1977), First Prize, Premio Ancona (1980), First Prize, International Sinfonia Musicale Competition (1982), Connecticut Commission on the Arts Grant, with Chamber Music America (1983), The Chamber Music Society of Lincoln Center Elise L. Stoeger Prize for Chamber Music (1996), "Charles Ives Living" award, American Academy of Arts & Letters (1998), Composer-in Residence, American Academy In Rome (1999), Berlin Prize Fellow, American Academy in Berlin (2001) a Guggenheim Fellowship (2003), and was elected to membership, American Academy of Arts and Letters (2006).

Bresnick is currently a professor at the Yale School of Music, where he has been a widely influential teacher of contemporary composition. His teaching has been recognized by a Walter J. Gores Award for Excellence in Teaching at Stanford University, a Morse Fellowship from Yale University (1980–81), the ASCAP Foundation's Aaron Copland Prize for teaching, and the Yale School of Music’s highest honor, the Sanford Medal for Service to Music. See: List of music students by teacher: A to B#Martin Bresnick. In early November 2026, the Yale School of Music announced that Professor Bresnick would retire from teaching at the end of the 2026-27 academic year.

Bresnick has been recognized as having composed a large catalog of respected works while teaching and as an influential voice at the Yale School of Music. Notable recent performances including a 60th birthday retrospective at Carnegie Hall’s Zankel Hall, the premiere of his oratorio “Passions of Bloom” on the International Festival of Arts and Ideas, the premiere of his fourth string quartet “The Planet on the Table” by the Brentano String Quartet, and a performance of his piano concerto “Caprichos Enfaticos” at the Nasher Sculpture Center.

== Film work ==
As a composer for films, he has contributed many scores for documentary films, including Arthur and Lillie (1975) and The Day After Trinity (1980), both of which were nominated for Academy Awards. He also composed the score for the PBS documentary Muhammad: Legacy of a Prophet.

== Major works ==
Bresnick's compositions tend to be concise and direct in expression, and span a wide spectrum of genres. Some of his works were composed as a cycle called Opere della Musica Povera, or Works of a Poor Music.

Opera

- "My Friend's Story" An Opera in a Prolog, 3 Scenes and an Epilog based on a story by Anton Chekhov

Oratorio

- "Passions of Bloom" for solo voices, chorus (SATB) and orchestra
- "Self Portraits 1964, Unfinished" for chorus (SATB) and saxophone quartet

Orchestra

- "Angelus Novus"
- "Encore!"
- "Falling" for orchestra and mezzo-soprano
- "Grace" for two marimbas and orchestra
- "Little Suite" for amateur string orchestra
- "Ocean of Storms"
- "On An Overgrown Path" (Janáček-Bresnick) for chamber orchestra
- "ONE" for chamber orchestra
- "Pan Penseroso" for solo flute and orchestra
- "Pontoosuc"
- "Sinfonia"
- "The Way It Goes"
- "Wir Weben, Wir Weben" for string orchestra

Large ensemble

- "Ants" for woodwind quintet, contrabass, percussion, harp, soprano, mezzo, tenor, baritone soli, 5 actor/mimes
- "B.'s Garlands" for 8 cellos
- "Bread & Salt" for 2 flutes, 2 oboes, 2 clarinets, 2 bassoons, 2 saxes, 2 horns, cello, contrabass
- "Der Signál" for flute, clarinet, cornet, trombone, viola, cello, contrabass, percussion, soprano, alto, mezzo soli, narrator or tape
- "Fanfare" for 4 trumpets, 4 horns, 4 trombones
- "Fantasia on a Theme by Willie Dixon" for vibraphone, clarinet, drum set, Piano, electric Organ, Violin, electric guitar
- "Introit" for 2 flutes, 2 oboes, 2 clarinets, 2 bassoons, 4 horns, 2 trumpets, 2 trombones
- "Musica" for flute, clarinet, bassoon, horn, trumpet, trombone, violin, voila, cello
- "Parisot" for 12 cellos

Small ensemble

- "***" (Three Stars) for clarinet, viola (opt. violin), and piano
- "A Message from the Emperor" for two speaking percussionists marimba, vibraphone, four small drums amplification as needed
- "And I Always Thought" for clarinet, violin, and piano
- "Ballad" for cello and piano
- "BE JUST!" for clarinet, cello, contrabass, guitar, piano, percussion
- "Bird as Prophet" for violin and piano
- "Bitter Suite" for violin and piano
- "The Bucket Rider"
- "Capricho Nuevo" for clarinet, alto saxophone, percussion, vibraphone, piano, violin, contrabass
- "Caprichos Enfaticos: Los Desastres de la Guerra" for piano and percussion quartet
- "Conspiracies" for solo flute and four other flutes
- "Elan's Blues" for violin, cello, piano
- "Everything Must Go" for saxophone quartet
- "Everything Must Go" for trombone quartet
- "Follow Your Leader" for bass clarinet, bassoon, percussion, piano, violin, viola, cello; or bass clarinet, bassoon, barisax, percussion, piano, synth, violin
- "Going Home" (Vysoke, My Jerusalem) for oboe, violin, viola, cello
- "Grace" for 2 marimbas and piano
- "Handwork" for 2 pianos
- "High Art" for piccolo and piano (opt. toy piano)
- "Just Time" for woodwind quintet
- "La Gaya Scienza" for Brass Quintet (Bass Trombone) & Timpani
- "Mending Time" for saxophone quartet
- "My Twentieth Century" for flute, clarinet, violin, viola, cello, piano
- "Pan Penseroso" (Version 3) for flute with multiphonics and piano
- "Pan Penseroso" (Version 4) for 2 flutes and piano
- "Pigs & Fishes" for clarinet, bassoon, percussion, piano, violin, viola, cello
- "Pine Eyes" for narrator, 2 percussion, clarinet/bass clarinet in Bb, piano
- "Prayers Remain Forever" for cello and piano
- "Songs of the Mouse People" for cello and vibraphone
- "String Quartet No. 1"
- "String Quartet No. 2" (Bucephalus)
- "String Quartet No. 3"
- "String Quartet No. 4" (The Planet on the Table)
- "Tent of Miracles" for solo baritone sax, tape; or solo bass clarinet, tape; or solo bassoon, tape; or solo baritone sax and three baritone saxes; or solo bass clarinet and three bass clarinets; or solo bassoon and three bassoons
- "Trio" for 2 trumpets and piano
- "Trio" for violin, cello, and piano
- "Tucket" for bass clarinet, bassoon, percussion, piano, violin, viola, cello; or bass clarinet, bassoon, baritone sax, percussion, piano, synth., violin; or brass quintet
- "Willie's Way" for woodwind quintet
- "Wir Weben, Wir Weben" for string sextet

Solo compositions

- "Bag O' Tells" for mandolin
- "Bundists" (Robert, György and Me) for piano
- "Conspiracies" for flute and tape
- "Extrana Devocion" (Strange Devotion) for piano
- "For the Sexes: The Gates of Paradise" for piano and DVD projections
- "Four Short Piano Pieces" for piano
- "Ishi's Song" for piano
- "Joaquin is Dreaming" for guitar
- "Josephine, the Singer" for violin
- "Lady Neil's Dumpe" for CX7 digital synthesizer; TX 816 driven by Mac
- "On an Overgrown Path" for solo guitar
- "Strange Devotion" for piano
- "Tent of Miracles" for baritone sax solo and tape; or bass clarinet solo and tape; or bassoon solo and tape
- "The Dream of the Lost Traveler" for piano
- "Theme and Variations" for oboe
- "Three Intermezzi" for cello
- "Willie's Way" for solo piano

Vocal compositions

- "Falling" for mezzo-soprano and piano
- "New Haven" for SATB chorus a cappella
- "The Human Abstract" for mezzo-soprano and piano
- "Three Choral Songs" for SATB chorus a cappella
- "Where is the Way" for SATB chorus a cappella
- "Woodstock" for SATB chorus a cappella

== Recordings ==
- 2024: Ways You Went Navona Records
  - Includes Martin Bresnick: "Self-Portraits 1964, Unfinished" (Performed by The Crossing, PRISM Quartet, and Donald Nally, conductor)
- 2021: More Essential Martin Bresnick: The Planet on the Table Cantaloupe Music
  - Includes Martin Bresnick: "The Planet on the Table" (Performed by the Brentano String Quartet)
  - Includes Martin Bresnick: "Parisot" (Performed by Ashley Bathgate, cello)
  - Includes Martin Bresnick: "Bird as Prophet" (Performed by Elly Toyoda, violin, Lisa Moore, piano)
  - Includes Martin Bresnick: "Bundists" (Performed by Lisa Moore, piano)
- 2019: David Bowlin: Bird as Prophet New Focus Recordings
  - Includes Martin Bresnick: "Bird as Prophet" (Performed by David Bowlin, violin, Tony Cho, piano)
- 2017: Parisot
  - Includes Martin Bresnick: "Parisot" (Performed by Ashley Bathgate, cello)
- 2016: Lisa Moore: The Stone People Cantaloupe Music
  - Includes Martin Bresnick: "Ishi's Song" (Performed by Lisa Moore, piano)
- 2014: Prayers Remain Forever Starkland
  - Includes Martin Bresnick: "Going Home – Vysoke, My Jerusalem" (Performed by Double Entendre)
  - Includes Martin Bresnick: "Ishi's Song" (Performed by Lisa Moore)
  - Includes Martin Bresnick: "Josephine The Singer" (Performed by Sarita Kwok)
  - Includes Martin Bresnick: "Strange Devotion" (Performed by Lisa Moore)
  - Includes Martin Bresnick: "A Message From the Emperor" (Performed by Michael Compitello and Ian Rosenbaum)
  - Includes Martin Bresnick: "Prayers Remain Forever" (Performed by Lisa Moore and Ashley Bathgate)
- 2011: Caprichos Enfáticos Cantaloupe Music (Performed by Lisa Moore and So Percussion)
  - Includes Martin Bresnick: "Farándula simple (Farandole simple)"
  - Includes Martin Bresnick: "Farándula de charlatanes – No saben el camino (Farandole of charlatans – They don’t know the way.)"
  - Includes Martin Bresnick: "Estragos de la guerra (Ravages of war)"
  - Includes Martin Bresnick: "Farándula de políticos – Contra el bien general (Farandole of politicians – Against the common good.)"
  - Includes Martin Bresnick: "Farándula de populacho (Farandole of the rabble)"
  - Includes Martin Bresnick: "¡Extraña Devoción! (Strange devotion!)"
  - Includes Martin Bresnick: "Farándula de creyentes – Nada. Ello lo dice (Farandole of believers – Nothing. That is what it says.)"
  - Includes Martin Bresnick: "Farándula doble (Farandole double)"
- 2010: Every Thing Must Go. Albany Records.
  - Includes Martin Bresnick: Willie's Way" (Performed by Lisa Moore)
  - Includes Martin Bresnick: Falling (Performed by Abigail Nims and Wei-yi Yang)
  - Includes Martin Bresnick: Ballade (Performed by Ashley Bathgate and Lisa Moore)
  - Includes Martin Bresnick: Three Choral Songs (Performed by the Yale Camerata)
  - Includes Martin Bresnick: Every Thing Must Go (Performed by the Prism Saxophone Quartet)
- 2009: Americans in Rome: Music by Fellows of the American Academy in Rome Bridge Records
  - Includes Martin Bresnick: Three Intermezzi (Performed by Ole Akahoshi, cello)
- 2006: The Essential Martin Bresnick Cantaloupe Music.
  - Includes Martin Bresnick: String Quartet #2 "Bucephalus" (Performed by the Flux Quartet)
  - Includes Martin Bresnick: Trio for piano, violin, and violoncello (Performed by the Jupiter Trio)
  - Includes Martin Bresnick: The Bucket Rider (Performed by the Bang on a Can All-Stars)
  - Includes Martin Bresnick: BE JUST! (Performed by the Bang on a Can All-Stars)
  - Includes Martin Bresnick: For the Sexes: The Gates of Paradise (DVD: Performed by Lisa Moore)
- 2005: Martin Bresnick: My 20th Century New World Records.
  - Includes Martin Bresnick: Grace
  - Includes Martin Bresnick: Tent of Miracles
  - Includes Martin Bresnick: Songs of the Mouse People
  - Includes Martin Bresnick: Fantasia on a Theme by Willie Dixon
  - Includes Martin Bresnick: My Twentieth Century
- 2003: High Art: Chamber Music for Solo Flute Albany Records.
  - Includes Martin Bresnick: High Art
- 2000: Martin Bresnick: Works of a Poor Music CRI / New World Records
  - Includes Martin Bresnick: Tucket
  - Includes Martin Bresnick: Follow Your Leader
  - Includes Martin Bresnick: Pigs & Fishes
  - Includes Martin Bresnick: New Haven
  - Includes Martin Bresnick: Woodstock
  - Includes Martin Bresnick: Angelus Novus
  - Includes Martin Bresnick: The Bucket Rider!
  - Includes Martin Bresnick: BE JUST!
  - Includes Martin Bresnick: ***
  - Includes Martin Bresnick: The Dream of the Lost Traveller
  - Includes Martin Bresnick: Pine Eyes
  - Includes Martin Bresnick: Bird as Prophet
- 2000: Conspirare: Chamber Music for Solo Flute CRI
  - Includes Martin Bresnick: Conspiracies
- 1995: Martin Bresnick: Music for Strings CRI / New World Records
  - Includes Martin Bresnick: String Quartet No. 2 "Bucephalus"'
  - Includes Martin Bresnick: Wir Weben, Wir Weben
  - Includes Martin Bresnick: B.'s Garlands
  - Includes Martin Bresnick: String Quartet No. 3
- 1995: Long Distance. CRI.
  - Includes Martin Bresnick: Bag O' Tells
- 1994: The Monticello Trio: Bresnick, Ives and Shatin CRI / New World Records
  - Includes Martin Bresnick: Trio
- 1993: CDCM Computer Music Series Vol. 2 Centaur Records.
  - Includes Martin Bresnick: Lady Neil's Dumpe
- 1992: New York Woodwind Quintet Plays Bresnick, Powell, Roseman, Shapey New World Records.
  - Includes Martin Bresnick: Just Time
