= Michael Gilbertson (composer) =

American classical composer

Michael Gilbertson (born 1987) is an American composer, conductor and pianist. He was one of three finalists for the 2018 Pulitzer Prize for Music, making him one of the youngest finalists in the history of the award.

== Early life and education ==
Gilbertson earned degrees from The Juilliard School and Yale University. Among his composition teachers have been Samuel Adler, David Lang, John Corigliano, Christopher Rouse, Aaron Jay Kernis, Martin Bresnick, Ezra Laderman, Hannah Lash and Christopher Theofanidis.

== Career ==
He is the BMI Composer in Residence with the San Francisco Chamber Orchestra, a position for which he has written a guitar concerto and an oboe concerto. His published music includes choral works with Boosey & Hawkes and G. Schirmer, and orchestral works with Theodore Presser. His orchestral music has been performed by the Minnesota Orchestra, Pittsburgh Symphony Orchestra, San Francisco Chamber Orchestra, Hong Kong Sinfonietta, United States Marine Band and many regional orchestras,. An opera of his was performed by the Washington National Opera at the Kennedy Center; his choral music by Musica Sacra, The Crossing, and many others, and his five ballets have been performed by (among others) the New York Choreographic Institute and the Aspen Santa Fe Ballet. His music was featured in a 2006 documentary, Rehearsing a Dream, that was nominated for an Academy Award. He was a professor at the San Francisco Conservatory of Music, teaching musicianship and music theory, and now teaches at the Boston Conservatory at Berklee, for composition.

Among the awards he has received are five Morton Gould Awards from ASCAP, a Lieberson Fellowship from the American Academy of Arts and Letters, a BMI Student Composer Award and, in 2013, BMI's prestigious Boudleaux Bryant Commission. His piano trio Fold by Fold received the Israel Prize from the Society for New Music. In March 2016, Musical America chose him as New Artist of the Month.

In 2009, Gilbertson founded a festival, Chamberfest Dubuque, as an annual fundraiser for the school at which he started his musical studies, Northeast Iowa School of Music. He returns to direct it annually.
