= New York Polyphony =

American male classical vocal quartet

New York Polyphony is a male classical vocal quartet based in New York City specializing in Early Music.

The group's stated mission is to revive rarely heard masterpieces of antiquity. The quartet has produced numerous world-premiere recordings of obscure works by a range of composers including Loyset Compère, Thomas Créquillon, and Francisco de Peñalosa.

While the ensemble's core repertoire is rooted in Renaissance and Medieval music, it has expanded its focus to include contemporary works, both in live performance and recorded output. Since the group's founding in 2006, New York Polyphony has demonstrated a commitment to new music and—in the case of commissions by Paul Moravec, Andrew Smith, Gabriel Jackson, and Akemi Naito—works by living composers. Noteworthy events include the European premiere of the Missa Charles Darwin—a newly commissioned secular Mass setting based on texts of Charles Darwin by composer Gregory W. Brown—at the Museum für Naturkunde, participation in Jonathan Berger’s chamber opera cycle Visitations at the Prototype Festival, and the premiere of the Vespers Sequence, a multi-movement concert work by Ivan Moody.

New York Polyphony tours extensively throughout the United States and Europe. They have participated in major international festivals and concert series, including the Miller Theatre Music Series at Columbia University; Rheingau Musik Festival, Thüringer Bachwochen (Germany); Festival Oude Muziek Utrecht (Netherlands); Stiftskonzerte Oberösterreich (Austria); Festival de Música de Morelia (Mexico); Elora Festival (Canada); Cartagena Festival International de Música (Colombia); and Choral at Cadogan Hall in London.

Since 2011, New York Polyphony has recorded for BIS Records. Their 2014 effort Sing thee Nowell scored the ensemble a second GRAMMY nomination, following the critically acclaimed release Times go by Turns (2013).

Prior to signing with BIS Records, New York Polyphony released two albums on the British label Avie Records: I sing the birth (2007) and Tudor City (2010). Both received substantial critical acclaim, with the latter reaching #6 on the Billboard classical chart in June 2010.

In 2011, a Gregorian chant remix competition sponsored by Indaba Music resulted in the digital album Devices and Desires.

New York Polyphony made their television debut in December 2011 on The Martha Stewart Show.

New York Polyphony includes Geoffrey Williams (countertenor), Steven Caldicott Wilson (tenor), Andrew Fuchs (tenor) and Craig Phillips (bass).

== Discography ==
- I Sing the Birth (2007)
- Tudor City (2010)
- Surrexit Christus - EP (2010)
- Devices & Desires (2011)
- endBeginning (2012)
- Times go by Turns (2013) - 56th GRAMMY nominee - Best Chamber Music/ Small Ensemble Performance
- Sing thee Nowell (2014) - 57th GRAMMY nominee - Best Chamber Music/ Small Ensemble Performance
- Roma Aeterna (2016)
- Missa Charles Darwin (2017)
- Lamentationes (2019) - shortlist - 2020 Gramophone Record of the Year/ Early Music Category
- And the sun darkened (2021)
- Sky of My Heart (2025)
