= Gabriel Jackson =

Gabriel Jackson may refer to:

- Gabriel Jackson (composer) (born 1962), English composer and arranger
- Gabriel Jackson (Hispanist) (1921–2019), American hispanist and historian
