= Benjamin C. S. Boyle =

American composer and pianist (born 1979)

- Born: September 1, 1979 (age 47); Monterey, California, U.S.
- Education: University of South Florida; Peabody Institute; University of Pennsylvania
- Occupations: Composer; pianist
- Website: www.benjamincsboyle.com

Benjamin C. S. Boyle (born September 1, 1979) is an American composer of contemporary classical music and pianist.

== Life and career ==
Benjamin C. S. Boyle was born on September 1, 1979, in Monterey, California, United States.

His compositional output includes opera, orchestral music, chamber music, choral music, art songs, and works for piano. Notable performances include the premiere of Boyle's Hudson Sinfonia for brass ensemble premiered by the Royal Concertgebouw Orchestra at Riverside Church in New York City in April 2009. His Concerto for Marimba and Orchestra was premiered with marimbist Makoto Nakura and Montreal Chamber Orchestra, conducted by Wanda Kalusny in June 2015. Chicago Lyric Opera premiered Boyle's choral work The Holly and the Ivy in December 2008. His Concerto for Organ and Orchestra was commissioned by Hope College Orchestra and premiered with organist Huw Lewis, conducted by Richard Piippo in November 2007. In May 2005, Bachanalia Orchestra, conducted by Vladimir Lande, premiered the Cantata To One in Paradise for string orchestra and four vocal soloists at Merkin Hall in New York. That same year he won the Young Concert Artists composition competition. He has been commissioned by many major performing groups including The Crossing Choir, conducted by Donald Nally. He has written for many talented soloists including cellists Scott Kluksdahl and Efe Baltacigil, harpist Emmanuel Ceysson, pianists Chu-Fang Huang, Magdalena Baczewska and Charles Abramovic, flutist Mimi Stillman, soprano Véronique Chevallier, baritones Randall Scarlata and James Rogers, violinist Emil Chudnovsky and many others. He has worked with conductors Mark Shapiro, Lance Friedel, Sarah Hicks, and Richard Piippo. Boyle is represented by Young Concert Artists, Inc. His music is published by Rassel Editions.

His formative studies in composition, harmony, counterpoint, and analysis were under the guidance of composer and theorist Philip Lasser of the Juilliard School. He was trained in the method of Nadia Boulanger and continues to build on her pedagogic foundation through both his compositional and theoretical activities. He is the Associate Director of the European American Musical Alliance and Faculty at the Nadia Boulanger Institute.

At the age of 25, Boyle was the youngest person ever to receive a PhD from the University of Pennsylvania in Composition, after completing a M.M. from The Peabody Conservatory and a B.M. from the University of South Florida where he studied piano with Robert Helps. Past composition teachers of his include Narcis Bonet, David del Tredici, Christopher Theofanidis, Samuel Adler, Lukas Foss, Jay Reise and Nicholas Maw.

Reviews of Boyle's music have been published in The Washington Post, The New York Times, The Philadelphia Inquirer, The Washington Times, The New York Concert Review, and many other publications.

== List of works ==
=== Opera ===
- A Call to Arms (2001)

=== Orchestral ===
- Cantata No. 3: Les fous et leurs chimeres, Opus 51 - for tenor, string trio, & choir (2022)
- Cantata No. 2: Voyages, Opus 41 - for string orchestra, choir, & soloists (2018)
- Concerto for Marimba and Chamber Orchestra, Opus 34 (2015)
- Impromptus and Arabesques, Opus 20 - for orchestra (2009)
- Hudson Sinfonia, Opus 19 - for brass ensemble (2009)
- Concerto for Organ and Orchestra, Opus 14 - for organ and large orchestra (2007)
- Cantata No. 1: To One in Paradise, Opus 8 - for string orchestra, choir, & soloists (2005)
- Ophelia, Opus 5 - for soprano and large orchestra (2004)

=== Choral ===
- Alegria mansa, Opus 50 - for choir - SATB (2023)
- Supplice, Opus 39 - for choir - SATB (2017)
- Empire of Crystal, Opus 46 - for choir - SATB (2015)
- Paean, Opus 33 - for choir - SATB (2013)
- The Lamentations of Jeremiah, Opus 28 - for choir - SATBarBass (2012)
- Down with the Rosemary, Opus 22 - for choir and organ (2009)
- The Holly and the Ivy, Opus 18 - for choir (2008)
- Lo, how a rose e'er blooming, Opus 13 - for choir and organ (2006)
- I Will Sing to the Lord, Opus 16c - for choir and organ (2005)
- Splendor and Honor, Opus 16b - for choir and organ (2004)
- Arise, Shine, for your light has come, Opus 16a - for choir and organ (2003)
- Ave Maria No. 2 - for choir - TTBB (2003)
- Ave Maria No. 1 - for choir - SATB (2002)
- Mass in F - for choir and organ (2002)

=== Chamber music ===
- Sonata, Opus 47 - for oboe and piano (2020)
- Sonata, Opus 36 - for viola and piano (2016)
- Au defaut du silence, Opus 31 - for baritone, string quartet, and piano (2013)
- Les bois du paradis, Opus 27 - for marimba and piano (2012)
- Sonata-Cantilena, Opus 21 - for flute and piano (2009)
- Sonata, Opus 12 - for violoncello and piano (2005)
- Sonata-Fantasy, Opus 7 - for violin and piano (2003)
- Kreutzer Concert Variations, Opus 6 - for violin and piano (2003)
- Trio No. 4 - for violin, viola & piano (2000)

=== Art songs ===
- La vita nouva, Opus 49 (Dante) - (2021)
- The Strains of Philomel, Opus 48 (Keats) - (2021)
- Two Southern Songs, Opus 44 (Toomer) - (2019)
- Song of Solomon, Opus 43 (The Bible, KJV) - (2019)
- Le dormeur du Val, Opus 42 (Rimbaud) - (2018)
- Spirits in Bondage, Opus 40 (C.S. Lewis) - (2017)
- Reverie and Lullaby, Opus 38 (Teasdale) - (2016)
- Zelda's Dream, Opus 35 (Z. Fitzgerald) - (2015)
- Danny Boy, Opus 32 (Traditional) - (2014)
- Songs of Virtue and Loss, Opus 30 (Wharton) - (2013)
- Guinevere, Opus 29 (Cawein) - (2013)
- Folksongs from another World, Opus 25 (various poets) - (2012)
- Chansons de Diane, Opus 24 (Baudelaire) - (2011)
- Le passage des rêves, Opus 15 (Valéry) - (2007)
- Trois Chansons, Opus 11 (Baudelaire) - (2002)
- Lenoriana, Opus 4 (E.A.Poe) - (2002)
- Quatre Chansons (Baudelaire) - (2000)
- Ophelia, Opus 3 (Shakespeare) - (2000)

=== Piano ===
- Suite d'hiver, Opus 45 - for two pianos - (2019)
- Impromptus and Arabesques, Opus 17 - (2008)
- Ballade, Opus 9 - (2004)
- Three Preludes - (2003)
- Variations on a Theme by Chopin, Opus 26 - (2000)

=== Marimba ===
- Variations on a Bach Chorale, Opus 37 - for solo marimba (2016)

=== Harp ===
- Sonatine, Opus 23 - for solo harp (2010)
- Suite Sylvanesque, Opus 10 - for solo harp (2006)±

=== Transcriptions ===
- Zigeunerlieder of Johannes Brahms - for solo violin and string orchestra (2004)
- Novelettes of Francis Poulenc - for string orchestra (2004)
- Selected Mazurkas of Frédéric Chopin - for string quartet (2003)
