= Chris Jonas =

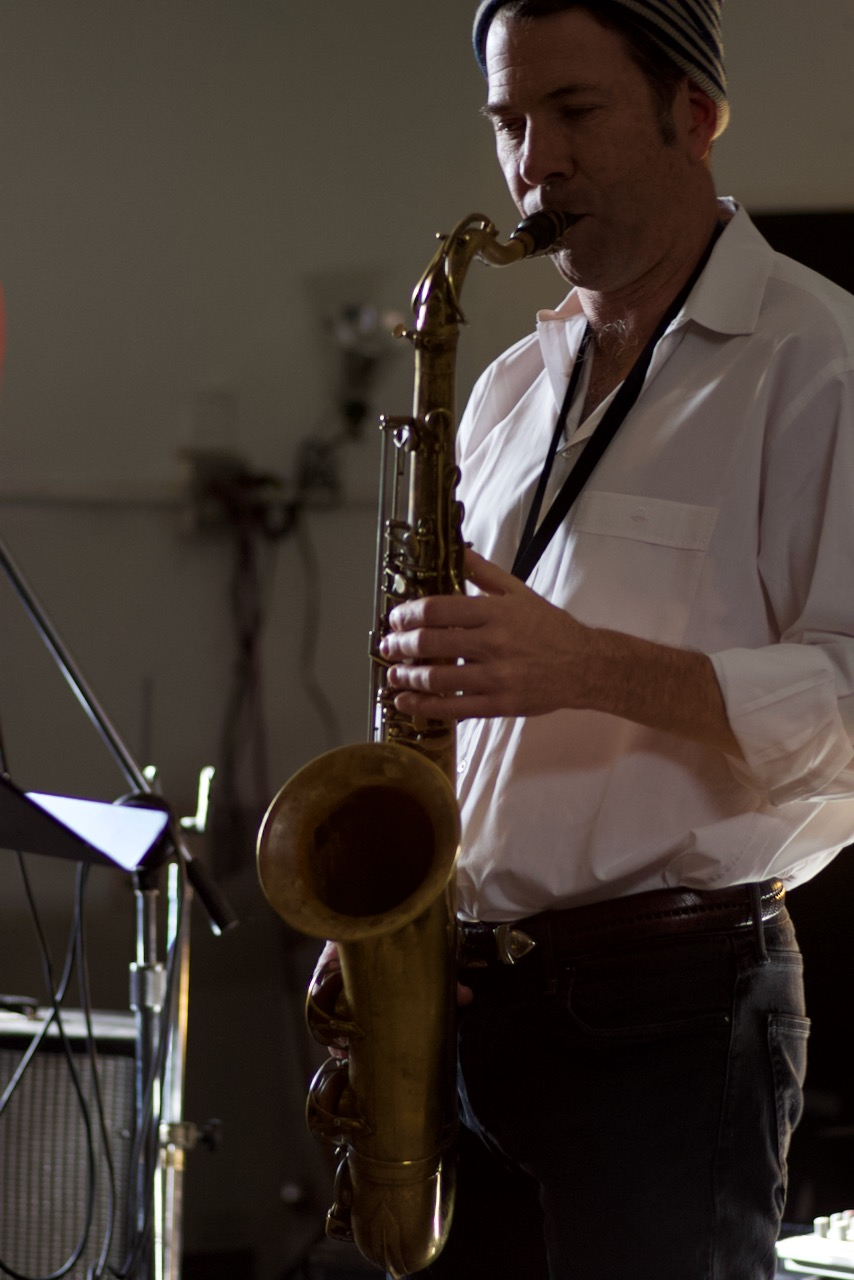

Background information
- Born: September 3, 1966 (age 60)
- Genres: jazz, experimental music, avant-garde jazz, free jazz, contemporary classical music, free improvisation
- Occupations: Musician, Composer, Conductor, Educator, Video Artist, Installation Artist, New Media Artist, Film Producer, and Editor

Chris Jonas (born September 3, 1966, in Newport Beach, California) is a Santa Fe, New Mexico-based composer, conductor, soprano and tenor saxophone player, filmmaker, and video artist.

Jonas has performed, recorded, and toured around the world with many musicians including TILT Brass, the Crossing Choir, Del Sol String Quartet, Butch Morris, Assif Tsahar, James Emery, Myra Melford, William Parker, Cecil Taylor, and Anthony Braxton

As a filmmaker, Jonas was co-composer and associate producer for the feature documentary Sembene! which premiered at Sundance and Cannes Film Festivals. He was producer, program director and composer for the 2013 PBS / American Graduate feature documentary Our Time is Now.

In 2025-26, he was co-producer, director and editor for the community film Dream Baby Dream. with the Jazzfest Berlin Film Labs. Dream Baby Dream premiered April 2026 at the Liminal Dance Film Festival in Washington DC, winning the InSeries COUNTERPOINT Award.

Since 1997, Jonas has acted as a board member of the Tri-Centric Foundation, a non-profit organization devoted to the ongoing work of Anthony Braxton, and is currently acting there as Vice President

In 2014, Jonas worked with Anthony Braxton in partnership with the Tri-Centric Foundation to create a projected video environment for Braxton's third major production of an opera, Trillium J (The Non-Unconfessionables), which premiered at Roulette, in Brooklyn, NY. For the 2015 Torino Jazz Festival and the 2019 Berlin Jazz Festival, Jonas served as a conductor for Braxton's 63-person orchestra project, Sonic Genome, a six-hour-long piece.

Jonas and artist/composer Molly Sturges co-founded a non-profit in New Mexico named Littleglobe, an arts and social justice organization. Jonas was Little Globe’s executive director from 2016-2025. Also with Sturges, Jonas is the recipient of the 2008 United States Artists Award in music and media as a Simon Fellow. He is a winner of the 2012 Meet the Composer/Commissioning USA Award for his multi-media immersive installations titled, GARDEN.

== Biography ==
Jonas attended Oberlin College where he played music but majored in art, earning his bachelor's degree in art history/art studio in 1988, after which he moved to Oakland, California to pursue a career in painting. In 1989, he met Anthony Braxton at Mills College, who would later become his lifelong collaborator.

In 1991, Jonas moved to New York, studying jazz at The New School for Social Research. Over the next decade he joined many projects there including those of William Parker, Cecil Taylor, Anthony Braxton, the Brooklyn Sax Quartet, and Butch Morris' conduction ensembles.

From 1992 to 1994, Jonas studied theory, harmony, and composition at Mannes School of Music with Robert Cuckson. During this time he became part of William Parker's Little Huey Creative Music Orchestra from 1992 to 2001. In 1993, Jonas helped to found the New York Improvisors Collective (1994–95), which eventually became the Vision Festival.

From 1995 to 1997, Jonas worked with Cecil Taylor to build an open-framework of scores for Taylor's compositions. It was also in 1995 that Jonas began working with Braxton. From 1996 to 1999, Jonas studied composition at Wesleyan University where he earned a master's degree in world music/composition. It was there he met his future collaborator Molly Sturges. In 2001, Jonas earned a Certificate in multimedia digital design from New York University before relocating to Santa Fe, New Mexico with Sturges. Sturges and Jonas would go on to win the 2008 United States Artists Award in music and media as a Simon Fellow, and to co-found Littleglobe in Santa Fe, NM. Jonas is also a winner of the 2012 Meet the Composer/Commissioning USA Award for GARDEN, a live music and immersive multi-media installation series.

Jonas has received commissions for large-scale installation, video, and musical performance works in the US and in Europe. These works include pieces with the Del Sol String Quartet, the Crossing Choir, Duo B Experimental Band, and the Chicago Improvisors Group. He has received commissions from the Museo Nacional de Antropología de México in Mexico City for the video and soundtrack installation of La Reina Roja (2005), and Odenwald 1152 (2007), both with collaborator Sturges and painter Ricardo Mazal. Other commissions include the Obras Artist-in-Residence Center in Alentejo, Portugal for night (2004), the Triskel Arts Centre and the European Capital of Culture Festival in Cork, Ireland for moment (2005), SITE Santa Fe’s sixth and seventh international Biennial exhibitions for In Situ (2007) and Malangan (2009), and was commissioned by the Santa Fe Opera and the Lensic Performing Arts Center for Memorylines (2007), a contemporary opera for which Jonas received the 2007 New Visions/New Mexico Contract Award.

Jonas has taught music and media at Wesleyan University, the College of Santa Fe, and for the New Media Arts Program at the Institute of American Indian Arts (IAIA) in Santa Fe, NM.

== Selected Discography ==
Jonas has appeared on more than 65 releases.

- backwardsupwardsky, Chris Jonas, 2025, Edgetone Records
- Sax QT (Lorraine), Anthony Braxton Saxophone Quartet, 2022
- Eeyahdi, Goggle Saxophone Quartet, 2021
- Thollem's Astral Traveling Sessions, Thollem / Santistevan / DeFoe / Hutchinson / Jonas, 2021, Astral Spirits
- Pentet, Pentet, 2020
- These Times, Ornetc, 2020
- Almeda (To Matie), Cecil Taylor, 2012, FMP
- Corona, Cecil Taylor & Sunny Murray, 2012, FMP
- Galore, Bing, 2004
- Adventure Reality, Amitosis, 2002
- The Vermilion, Chris Jonas' The Sun Spits Cherries featuring Myra Melford, 2001, Hopscotch
- Ensembles Unsynchronized, Chris Jonas Quintet, 2000, NewSonic Records
- The Sun Spits Cherries, Chris Jonas’ The Sun Spits Cherries, 1999, Hopscotch Records
- Child King Dictator Fool, Great Circle Saxophone Quartet, 1997, New World Records
- Echo Echo Mirror House (NYC), Anthony Braxton, 2011, Catalog #: NBH035
- GTM (OUTPOST) 2003 Composition 255 & 265, Anthony Braxton, Chris Jonas & Molly Sturges, 2010, Leo Records
- Septet (Pittsburgh) 2008, Anthony Braxton, 2008, Catalog #: NBH001
- Almeda, Cecil Taylor, 2005, FMP
- Mass for the Healing of the World, William Parker & the Little Huey Creative Music Orchestra, 2004, Black Saint
- Alto Quartets, James Fei, 2004, Organized Sound
- Light of Corona, Cecil Taylor, 2003, FMP
- Tentet (Paris), Anthony Braxton, 2001, Catalog #: NBH037
- The Sun Spits Cherries (with Joe Fiedler, Chris Washburne, Andrew Barker), 2000, Hopscotch
- Tentet (Wesleyan) 2000, Anthony Braxton, 2000, Catalog #:NBH013 NBH014
- Tentet (Antwerp) 2000, Anthony Braxton, 2000, Catalog #:NBH009.1 NBH009.2
- Tentet (Wesleyan) 1999, Anthony Braxton, 1999, Catalog #: NBH020 NBH021
- Trillium R: Shala Fears for the Poor (Opera), Anthony Braxton, 1999, Catalog #: BH008
- Sax Quintet (Middletown), Anthony Braxton, 1998, Catalog #:NBH006.1 NBH006.2
- Sax Quintet (NYC) 1998, Anthrony Braxton, 1998, Catalog #: NBH038
- Three Orchestras (GTM) 1998, Anthony Braxton, 1998
- Ensembles Unsynchronized (with James Fei, Cuong Vu, Joe Fiedler, Kevin Norton), 1998, Newsonic
- Four Compositions (Washington, D.C.) 1998, Anthrony Braxton, 1999
- Two Compositions (Trio) 1998, Anthrony Braxton, 1998
- Composition 169 + Ghost Trance (Ljubjiana), Anthony Braxton / The Slovenia National Radio Orchestra, 2001, Leo Records
- Mayor of Punkville, William Parker's "Little Huey" Orchestra, William Parker, 2000, Aum
- The Way of the Saxophone, Brooklyn Sax Quartet (C. Jonas, Sam Furnace, David Bindman, Fred Ho), 2000, Innova
- The Hollow World, Assif Tsahar's Brass Reeds Ensemble, 1999, Hopscotch Records
- Full Circle Suite, Joe Fonda Quintet (C. Jonas, Joe Fonda, Gebhard Ullman, Taylor Ho Bynum, Kevin Norton), 1999, CIMP
- Vision Vol. I: Vision Fest. ‘97 Compiled "Hoang", William Parker's "Little Huey" Orchestra, 1998, Aum
- Vision Vol. I: Vision Fest. ‘97 Compiled, "Conduction #72", Butch Morris, 1998, Aum
- Sunrise on the Tone World, William Parker's "Little Huey" Creative Music Orchestra, 1997, Aum
- Child King Dictator Fool, Great Circle Saxophone Quartet, 1997, New World Records
- Flowers Grow in My Room, William Parker's "Little Huey" Creative Music Orchestra, 1994, Centering
- American Works for Balinese Gamelan Orchestra, Evan Ziporyn/Nyoman Windha's "Kekembangan"(for sax quartet and Balinese Gamelan Orchestra), Gamelan Sekar Jaya, 1993, New World Records

== Awards and honors ==
- Winner of the 2007 New Visions/New Mexico Award for the video portion of Memorylines, commissioned by The Santa Fe Opera.
- With Molly Sturges, Jonas received the 2008 United States Artists Award in music and media as Simon Fellow.
- Awarded by the Pew Center for Arts & Heritage Commission Grant in 2011 for The Gulf (between you and me) with the Crossing Choir.
