= John Lambert (composer) =

- Born: John Arthur Neil Lambert; 15 July 1926; Maidenhead, England
- Died: 7 March 1995 (aged 68) Brighton, England
- Genres: Classical
- Occupations: Composer, teacher

John Lambert (15 July 1926 – 7 March 1995) was a British music composer and teacher.

== Biography ==
John Arthur Neil Lambert was born at Maidenhead. After obtaining a post at the Royal College of Music, he lived at Brighton for the rest of his life, where he shared a house with organist Timothy Bond. He died in Brighton from liver cancer.

== Music career ==
Lambert studied at the Royal Academy of Music, and then at the Royal College of Music. He studied with Nadia Boulanger privately in Paris; that study ended in 1953.

In 1958 Lambert was named music director at the Old Vic theatre; he retained that post until 1962, when he accepted a post as professor of composition at the Royal College of Music. At the Royal College he established a dedicated experimental music group.

Lambert taught many students who went on to become noted in their own right, including Oliver Knussen, Antony Cooke, Mark-Anthony Turnage, Simon Bainbridge, Gabriel Jackson and Julian Anderson. He also taught Javier Álvarez, Gary Carpenter, David Fanshawe, Jonathan Lloyd, Carlos Miranda, Oswaldo González and Barrington Pheloung. See: List of music students by teacher: K to M#John Lambert. The striking thing about this list is the musical diversity which is represented therein. Lambert retired from teaching in 1990.

== Teaching style ==
Lambert was a gifted composer and an effective and influential teacher, and was widely regarded as "self-effacing".

For his entire teaching career, Lambert maintained an intense curiosity and openness to the latest trends in music. He stated that his musical development had been stinted by the lack of musical openness in mid-century England, and he hoped that his students would not suffer a similar deprivation. He exhibited this openness in his own curriculum; he regularly invited noted musical influences.

He encouraged musical students to develop an "analytical ear" - the ability to spot an interesting sound or phrase, then dissect it and sense its potential. He taught this technique in his Experimental Music Group, an improvisation seminar which he assembled each week from 1970 until 1990. This involved students both from the college and elsewhere, combining music with live electronics, theatre, dance, film and animation; a forum in which one could try out the most unexpected, even bizarre things and, if they did not come off, that was as important a discovery as if they did.

== Musical compositions ==
Lambert was most productive in his later years. He progressed most rapidly after taking the music director post at the Old Vic, where he worked with noted musicians of the period, such as Franco Zeffirelli. He composed music for a range of productions, but also commissioned music from other composers such as Thea Musgrave and Michael Tippett (whose music for The Tempest, 1962, was one of the most striking products of this era).

Possibly Lambert's most imposing composition during his Old Vic period was his Organ Mass, composed in a five-year stretch (1964–1968). After that he produced happier, more direct music, such as Formations and Transformations (1973), and an opera, Family Affairs, which premiered at the 1988 Brighton Festival.

Lambert's later works include a choral work, Scale (1988), and string quartets. His Second String Quartet (1986) revealed a more intimate side. The most ambitious project was the cycle Sea-Change (1978–94), five contrasting works for ensemble and electronics.
