= The Fifth Century =

Studio album by Gavin Bryars
- Released: November 18, 2016
- Recorded: July 2014 and June 2015
- Studio: Gould Hall at the Curtis Institute of Music; Saint Paul's Episcopal Church in Philadelphia
- Genre: Classical music, choral
- Length: 50:07
- Label: ECM New Series; ECM New Series 2405
- Producer: Manfred Eicher

Gavin Bryars chronology
I Tatti Madrigals (2016)	The Fifth Century (2016)	Adelaide Town Hall (2016)

The Fifth Century is a classical and choral studio album by Gavin Bryars, conducted by Donald Nally, and performed by The Crossing choir with the saxophone quartet PRISM. This album was released in the label ECM New Series in November 2016. The album won the 2018 Grammy Award for Best Choral Performance.

== Composition ==
The album is divided in two parts. The first seven tracks are a named after a setting of words by the theologian and poet Thomas Traherne, and performed by the choir and saxophone quartet at the Gould Hall in the Curtis Institute of Music in July 2014. The second part, named "Two Love Songs" is the last two tracks of the album are an a cappella settings for the women of The Crossing. It was recorded in June 2015 at Saint Paul's Episcopal Church in Philadelphia.

== Reception ==
Professional ratings
Review scores
Source	Rating
All Music	3.5/5 stars
The Guardian	3/5 stars

James Manheim in his review for All Music says that "He [Gavin Bryars] has not written much choral music, but this ECM release may make his fans wish he had written more." and about the production, he says that "As usual with ECM, the sound engineers are among the stars of the show; their work on The Fifth Century, at the Curtis Institute in Philadelphia, is especially enchanting."

In The Guardian, Kate Molleson gave this album three stars and says that "the saxes weave around like extra voices and the blended sound of The Crossing and Prism is creamy and pliable" and Molleson add about the "Two love songs" part that it's "sung with a grace so chilly it might freeze at any moment."

== Track listing ==
All music is composed by Gavin Bryars

Part one: The Fifth Century (2014)
No.	Title	Length
1.	"We see the heavens with our eyes"	9:47
2.	"As sure as there is a space infinite"	5:37
3.	"Infinity of space is like a painter's table"	3:54
4.	"Eternity is a mysterious absence of times and ages"	6:42
5.	"Eternity magnifies our joys exceedingly"	3:17
6.	"His omnipresence is our field of joys"	5:50
7.	"Our bridegroom and our king being everywhere"	7:14

Part two: Two Love Songs (2010)
No.	Title	Length
8.	"Io amai sempre"	3:59
9.	"Solo et pensoso"	3:47
Total length:		50:07

== Personnel ==
- The Crossing – choir
- Donald Nally – conductor
- John Grecia – piano
- Prism Quartet:
  - Matthew Levy – tenor saxophone
  - Timothy McAllister – soprano saxophone
  - Taimur Sullivan – baritone saxophone
  - Robert Young – alto saxophone
