= Kile Smith =

American composer of choral, vocal, orchestral, and chamber music

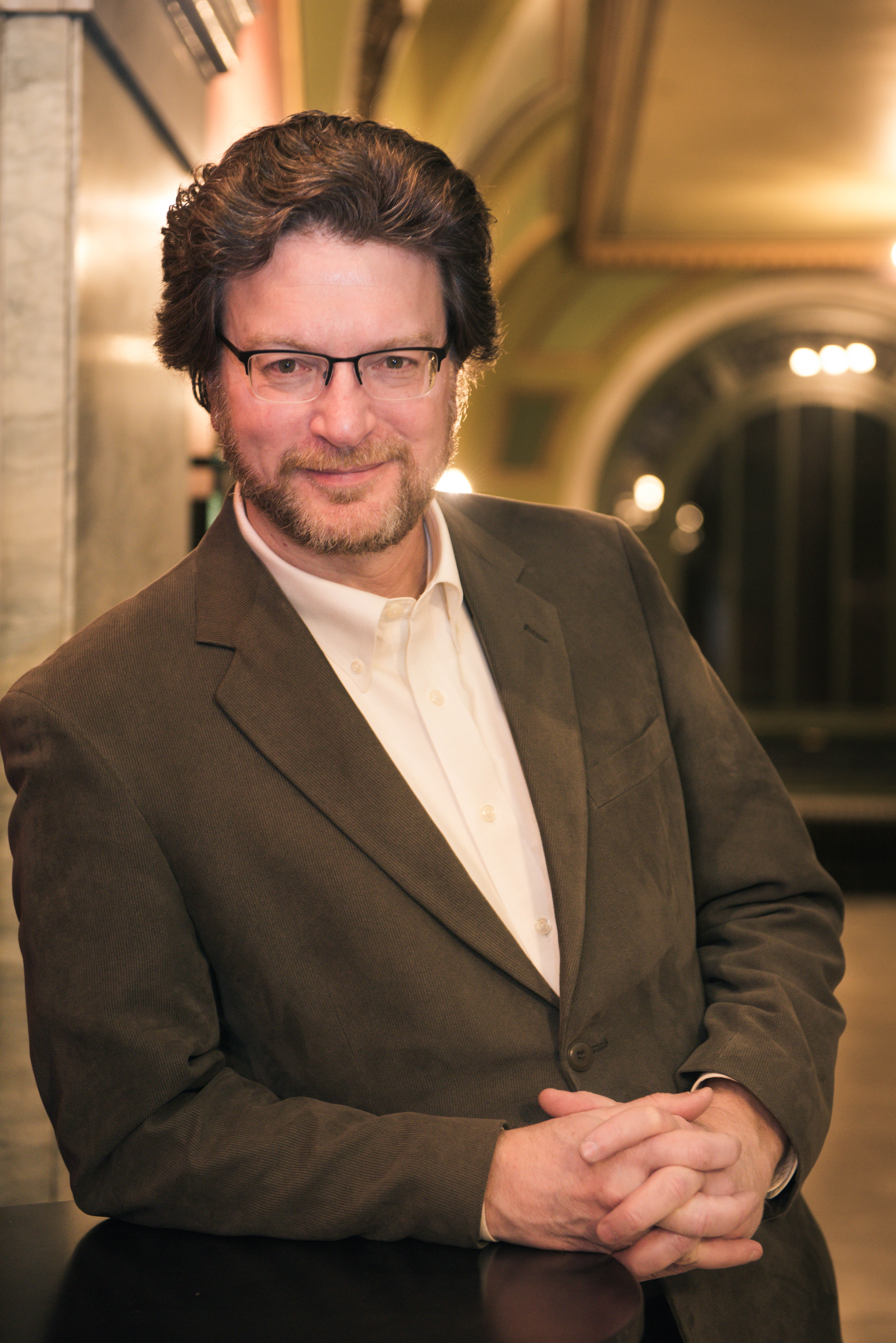
Kile Smith

Kile Smith (born August 24, 1956) is an American composer of choral, vocal, orchestral, and chamber music. The Dawn's Early Light with Conspirare and the Los Angeles Guitar Quartet received a 2022 Grammy nomination for Best Choral Performance, The Arc in the Sky with The Crossing also received a 2020 Grammy nomination for Best Choral Performance, and the Canticle CD by Cincinnati's Vocal Arts Ensemble helped win the 2020 Classical Producer of the Year Grammy for Blanton Alspaugh. A Black Birch in Winter, which includes Smith's Where Flames a Word, won the 2020 Estonian Recording of the Year for Voces Musicales.

His writings, mostly on composing and music, are published in the Philadelphia arts and culture online magazine Broad Street Review. He was curator of the Fleisher Collection of Orchestral Music at the Free Library of Philadelphia 1993–2011. He wrote and hosted the monthly Fleisher Discoveries podcast, 2018–2024, and co-hosted, produced, and wrote Discoveries from the Fleisher Collection on Philadelphia's WRTI-FM, 2002-2018. He is the recipient of a 2018 Independence Foundation Fellowship in the Arts for his first opera, The Book of Job.

== Biography ==
=== Early life and musical influences ===
Kile Smith was born in Camden, N.J., and lived in Pennsauken, N.J. until 1975. He has lived in or near Philadelphia ever since. His parents were are Leighton Edward Smith (1928–2024) and Carol Pauline (née Kile) Renne (1929–2026).

He was in the New Jersey All-State Chorus 1973, 1974. Smith credits this as helping to turn him toward composition. Entranced by the Brahms Nänie in the year his older sister Carole sang in All-State (1970), he later searched for a commercial recording and found a two-record album with the Orchestre de la Suisse Romande conducted by Ernest Ansermet. He eventually listened to the largest work on the album, the Brahms German Requiem, the opening of which so transfixed him, he has related, that he decided in 1973, age 16, to become a composer.

=== College years ===
Smith attended Philadelphia College of Bible (now Cairn University) as a double major leading to bachelor's degrees in Bible and Music Composition. His composition teachers were Edwin T. Childs and Chris Woods.

In 1979 Smith married Jacqueline Hardman, also a student at Philadelphia College of Bible, the daughter of the Rev. Jack Hardman (1929–1987) and Dorothy Pinckney Hardman (1930–1994).

He went to Temple University in 1980, receiving the M.Mus. in Music Composition in 1983. His composition teachers were Clifford Taylor and Maurice Wright. Smith received Alumnus of the Year awards from both Temple (2010) and Cairn (2012).

=== Work career ===
Smith conducted the choir at Immanuel Baptist Church in Maple Shade, New Jersey, 1977–78 and conducted the choir at Lower Merion Baptist Church, Bryn Mawr, Pennsylvania 1980–85, with his wife as organist. He began working part-time as a music copyist at the Fleisher Collection of Orchestral Music, "the world's largest circulating collection of orchestral performance sets," at the Free Library of Philadelphia in 1981, while studying for his master's degree. He was appointed full-time music copyist in 1983, copyist supervisor in 1986, assistant curator in 1988, and curator in 1993, a position he held until retiring in 2011 to compose full-time. He is the longest-serving curator of the Collection.

He and Jack Moore began the monthly radio broadcast Discoveries from the Fleisher Collection in October 2002 on WRTI-FM, Philadelphia's classical music and jazz station. Smith produced the show and wrote an online essay for each broadcast. He began substituting as a classical music host on WRTI in 2005, and in 2008 began hosting and producing a weekly American new music program, Now Is the Time. After retiring from the Fleisher Collection in 2011, Smith accepted more duties at WRTI, producing and voicing Arts Desk features, increased classical hosting duties, writing, editing, audio editing, voicing, interviewing and producing interviews, and serving 2016–17 as interim director of content. Smith left WRTI in 2017 to resume full-time composing. He continues to host and write Fleisher Discoveries as a monthly podcast, produced by the Fleisher Collection and the Free Library, beginning in December 2018.

As adjunct faculty he taught composition at Ursinus College in 2020, composition, advanced orchestration, and music history at Cairn University, 2010–16, and music notation at Temple University, 2012.

=== Personal life ===
Smith is married to the soprano, organist, and conductor Jacqueline Smith; they live in Huntingdon Valley, Pa. They have three daughters: Priscilla Herreid (b. 1986), an oboist, Baroque oboist, recorderist, and performer on Renaissance winds; Elena Kauffman (b. 1995), a cellist, Baroque cellist, and gambist; and Martina Adams (b. 1997), a French hornist. He sang and played percussion in the Medieval/Renaissance group Quidditas with his wife, daughters, and other singers and instrumentalists in the early 2000s, performing in concert a few times a year. He sings in the Franklinville-Schwarzwald Männerchor. He is an avid photographer.

== Composing ==
=== Early career ===
Smith's earliest compositions, from 1974, were art songs and choral anthems. Among his earliest extant works are settings of Shelley poems (Three Songs, No. 1, 1978) and a setting of Donne's "Batter My Heart, Three-Person'd God" (from Three Songs, No. 3, 1979). He wrote anthems for Lower Merion Baptist Church, and continued to compose for church choirs in which he sang and for which his wife was the organist/director, at Tabor Evangelical Lutheran Church, Philadelphia (1986–2000), Holy Trinity Lutheran Church, Abington, Pa. (2000–2023), where he began composing liturgical music in addition to anthems, and at Martin Luther Chapel, Pennsauken, N.J. (since 2023).

His Sinfonietta for orchestra (1983), his largest work until then, was performed by the Temple University Contemporary Music Orchestra under Clifford Taylor, and was his first reviewed piece, by Daniel Webster in the Philadelphia Inquirer. His 1986 Sonata for Tuba and Piano was composed for Brian Brown, and in 1988 he orchestrated it into the Concerto for Tuba and Orchestra, which Brown played with the Orchestra Society of Philadelphia under Mark Laycock that year. In 1989 he set three Poems of Gerard Manley Hopkins for his wife Jacqueline Smith to sing, accompanied by Samuel Hsu, at the Hopkins Centennial Conference, St. Joseph's University, Philadelphia. In 1990 the Concerto Soloists (now the Chamber Orchestra of Philadelphia) premiered his Hymn and Fugue No. 1 for string orchestra under founding director Marc Mostovoy.

He composed two chamber works for Philadelphia's Davidsbund Chamber Players, Hymn and Fugue No. 2 (piano trio, 1993) and Hymn and Fugue No. 3 (piano trio with alto saxophone, 1994). The Totentanz for solo guitar was premiered in 1994 by William Ghezzi at the George Antheil Music Festival in Trenton, N.J. He composed Variations on a Theme of Schubert for solo piano in 1997, Paul S. Jones premiering it at a Cairn University concert honoring the 25th anniversary of Samuel Hsu's teaching there. Smith added a movement and orchestrated it in 1999 for the premiere by Makiko Hirata with the Jupiter Symphony in New York City, conducted by Jens Nygaard, as part of Smith's 1999-2001 composer residency.

=== Since 2000 ===
For Jupiter he also orchestrated Poems of Gerard Manley Hopkins (2000) for tenor and orchestra. In 2001 Jupiter premiered The Three Graces for solo oboe, horn, cello, and strings (Gerard Reuter, Karl Kramer, Wolfram Kössel, soloists), a work of written-out jazz intended to sound like improvisation, in one of the last Jupiter concerts conducted by Jens Nygaard before his death. Smith has used jazz in other works: among them are An April Breeze (2002, premiered 2003) for solo trumpet and concert band, composed for the Philadelphia High School for the Creative and Performing Arts under Kevin Rodgers, with soloist John Thyhssen; the 45-minute song cycle for mezzo-soprano and baritone, In This Blue Room (2015), commissioned by Lyric Fest; Adieu, Adieu (2018), commissioned by Relâche; The Arc in the Sky, commissioned by The Crossing; the song "Blue Lobster" (2020), commissioned by Benjamin Flanders; and April Showers (2021), a five-song cycle commissioned by Conspirare.

The Consolation of Apollo, using words by Boethius and the Apollo 8 astronauts, is his most-performed major choral work, with more than 60 complete or excerpted performances. He has written works for Philadelphia Orchestra concertmaster David Kim, principal clarinet Ricardo Morales, English horn Elizabeth Starr Masoudnia, and principal horn Jennifer Montone.

=== Vespers ===
Piffaro, the Renaissance Band commissioned Vespers (2008) from Smith for their group of seven musicians playing 27 instruments, and the new-music choir The Crossing. The subsequent recording on the Innova label and dozens of favorable reviews brought Smith's name to international attention.

Gramophone Magazine called it "a spectacular work." David Patrick Stearns of the Philadelphia Inquirer called it Smith's "creative breakthrough." Musicweb International chose Vespers as its January 2010 Recording of the Month. Peter Burwasser, writing for Fanfare Magazine, put it on his 2009 Want List, and writing for the Philadelphia City Paper, included it on his 2009 Top Ten Classical list. After 2015 concerts by Seraphic Fire, David Fleshler wrote in the South Florida Classical Review that "the work sounds like no other music."

Vespers has received numerous performances by professional and university choirs, and one amateur choir. Smith has transcribed much of it for different combinations of modern and Baroque instruments, and individual movements are performed separately, including several movements Choral Arts Philadelphia, under Matthew Glandorf, commissioned and premiered in 2018, arranged for the instrumentation of the J. S. Bach Cantata No. 1, Wie schön leuchtet der Morgenstern.

=== Compositional style ===
Smith's music is modal and tonal. His voice-leading is meticulous, especially from Vespers (2008) on. Although he employs chromaticism on occasion, sometimes heavily, as in the middle movement of Where Flames a Word and in various songs, his pieces usually remain in one mode or key for extended periods. His music has always favored horizontal movement over vertical chord-building, which can lead to unexpected passing harmonies. Steven Ritter of Audiophile Audition wrote in his review of Vespers: "I'll call this music tonal with a twist; though modern, and it has some contemporary edges to it, it still feels almost uncomfortably familiar, a masterly mélange of old and new." Counterpoint of independent voices has become a greater hallmark of his style since Vespers. He stated in an interview on the composing of Canticle that text-painting is always important in his choral and vocal music. Performers and critics have noted the "vocal quality" of his music.

== Works ==
=== Orchestral ===
Smith has composed over 20 orchestral works, including a Symphony: Lumen ad revelationem (2002) premiered by the Lehigh Valley Chamber Orchestra. The English Symphony Orchestra under Kenneth Woods premiered his orchestration of The Bremen Town Musicians in 2021 with Gemma Whelan, narrator. His cello concerto And Seeing the Multitudes (2014) was commissioned by the Helena Symphony Orchestra and premiered by them with Ovidiu Marinescu, conducted by Allan R. Scott, as part of Smith's 2014–15 residency. His Even the Grass Must Sing (2025) is for chorus and orchestra. Shorter works include overtures for Helena (Gold and Silver, 2014), and Susquehanna Symphony Orchestra (Susquehanna, 2017). His works have been performed by the Chamber Orchestra of Philadelphia, the Delaware, Helena, Missoula, Grand Rapids, and Jackson (Tenn.) symphonies, the Ocean City Pops, and the Sofia, Sofia Youth, and Shumen State Philharmonics of Bulgaria.

He composed Exsultet (2007), horn and strings, for Jennifer Montone, principal horn of the Philadelphia Orchestra. The Red Book of Montserrat for strings was commissioned by the youth orchestra Philadelphia Sinfonia, and uses tunes from the 14th-century Llibre Vermell de Montserrat.

He orchestrated the solo piano (1997) Variations on a Theme of Schubert for piano with chamber orchestra (1999), and The Bremen Town Musicians, originally for violin, cello, and narrator (2008) for chamber orchestra (2016) for the English Symphony Orchestra. His Three Dances is in two versions: for chamber orchestra (1995) and string orchestra (1998, rev. 2012, 13).

=== Chamber, solo ===
Smith has composed about three dozen chamber and solo instrumental works, including Thirty Variations on a Theme of Bartók (2022) for piano, and There's a Land Beyond the River (2021) for clarinet and piano, premiered by Philadelphia Orchestra principal clarinet Ricardo Morales. The Bremen Town Musicians appeared on the Philadelphia Orchestra's Our City, Your Orchestra chamber series, 2021.

Other chamber works include In the Shelter of the Most High (2026) for English horn Elizabeth Starr Masoudnia (with violin and cello), A Child’s Afternoon (2018), flute and organ, for Anna and Erik Meyer, Adieu, Adieu (2018) for Relâche, The Nobility of Women (2011) for a Baroque sextet, Spirituals for Piano Trio (2018) for the Arcadian Trio, and two sets of American Spirituals, for violin and piano (2006, for Philadelphia Orchestra concertmaster David Kim) and cello and piano (2008, for Pittsburgh Symphony principal cello Anne Martindale Williams). Red-tail and Hummingbird (2013), commissioned jointly by Orchestra 2001 and Piffaro, The Renaissance Band, exists in many versions for mixed chamber ensembles of six parts, and in a version for brass quintet commissioned by the Philadelphia Brass.

Gaudete Brass in Chicago commissioned Annunciation and Magnificat (2016) for optional narrator and brass quintet. The Three Graces is in two versions: orchestral, for oboe, horn, cello, and strings (2001), and for soloists plus piano and double bass (2008). Ursinus College commissioned This Broad Land and The Better Angels of Our Nature (2010) for bassoon (or soprano saxophone) and piano.

Abington Presbyterian Church (Pa.) commissioned Two Meditations on Freu dich sehr (2013) for organist Alan Morrison for the inaugural recital on their rebuilt Möller organ. The Philadelphia Chapter, American Guild of Organists commissioned Reflection (2017); David Furniss premiered it on the Fred J. Cooper Memorial Organ for the 10th anniversary of its installation in Verizon Hall, the Kimmel Center, Philadelphia. It has been performed often since and is published by ECS Publishing.

=== Choral ===
Kile Smith's choral works include more than two dozen concert works (both sacred and secular), and more than two dozen church anthems. His Vespers received dozens of reviews of its performances and CD. He is published by ECS Publishing, Hal Leonard, GIA, and Concordia, and many of his works are distributed through MusicSpoke.

The Crossing has commissioned Smith more than any other composer; he has written, in addition to Vespers (commissioned by Piffaro), seven works for them: Where Flames a Word (2009, texts of Paul Celan), The Waking Sun (2011, texts of Seneca), The Consolation of Apollo (2014, texts of Boethius and the crew of Apollo 8), May Day (2015, poem by Ryan Eckes), You Are Most Welcome (2016, text from emails by The Crossing co-founder Jeffrey Dinsmore, who died in 2014), and The Arc in the Sky (2018), a concert-length work on texts by Robert Lax, and Let All the Strains of Joy (2025, Rabindranath Tagore).

The 23-minute oratorio Jesus Stood on the Shore (2025) was commissioned by the Church of the Blessed Sacrament, Seattle. Canticle, a concert-length setting of A Spiritual Canticle of the Soul and the Bridegroom Christ by St. John of the Cross, was commissioned by Cincinnati's Vocal Arts Ensemble and premiered by them in 2016 under Craig Hella Johnson. Johnson, with Conspirare of Austin, Texas, commissioned The Dawn's Early Light (2019) (with the Los Angeles Guitar Quartet and cello) and April Showers (2021). Agnus Dei (2015) was commissioned by the Mendelssohn Club of Philadelphia as a companion to the Wolfgang Amadeus Mozart Great Mass in C minor. Lyric Fest and the Pennsylvania Girlchoir, under director Mark Anderson, commissioned Two Laudate Psalms (2009) for high voice, girls' choir, and piano; the Girlchoir then commissioned, under director Vincent Metallo, How Do I Love Thee (2014, text by Elizabeth Barrett Browning). Piffaro commissioned Ave Maris Stella (2020) which premiered with Variant 6in October 2021. Variant 6 also premiered 2025's Endless Morn of Light (John Milton) with the Sylvan Consort of Viols, who commissioned it.

Anthems have been commissioned by the Episcopal Cathedral of Boston, Bryn Mawr Presbyterian Church (Pa.), The Church of the Holy Trinity in Philadelphia (resident composer, 2012–2020), Knox Presbyterian Church, Cincinnati, Presbyterian Church of Barrington (Ill.), Holy Trinity Evangelical Lutheran Church (Abington, Pa.), and many others. Mass for Philadelphia was commissioned for the 2012 annual conference of the Association of Anglican Musicians. Smith has composed music for 15 hymns, and has written the texts for three of those.

=== Vocal ===
He has composed 80 songs. These include three song cycles: the 17-song, 45-minute cycle for mezzo-soprano, baritone, and piano In This Blue Room (2015), texts of Philadelphia-area women poets inspired by the batik paintings of Laura Madeleine, commissioned and premiered by Lyric Fest, for whom he was resident composer 2014–15; Plain Truths (2011, 13) for baritone and piano or string quartet with optional chorus, commissioned by the Newburyport Chamber Music Festival, texts by Newburyport authors including the abolitionist William Lloyd Garrison; and April Showers (2021), commissioned by Conspirare, new music for 1920s popular song lyrics. Shorter collections of songs include Poems of Gerard Manley Hopkins (1989, 2000) and Poems of Stephen Berg (2000), commissioned by Network for New Music.

=== Opera ===
Smith is composing his first opera, The Book of Job, for which he is the librettist. For one soloist with choir and about 75 minutes long, it will premiere with Conspirare (Austin, Tex.) and The Crossing (Philadelphia).

== Discography ==
- American Spirituals, Book One. David Kim, Paul Jones. The Lord Is My Shepherd. PSJ Music, 2006
- American Spirituals, Book Two. Anne Martindale Williams, Paul Jones. Sacred Music for Cello. PSJ Music, 2009
- The Arc in the Sky. The Crossing, 2019
- The Bremen Town Musicians. Auricolae. The Double Album. New Focus, 2009
- The Bremen Town Musicians, for orchestra. English Symphony Orchestra, Fiddles, Forests, and Fowl Fables with Gemma Whelan, narrator, Kenneth Woods, conductor, 2021
- Canticle and Alleluia. Vocal Arts Ensemble, 2018
- A Child's Afternoon. Anna Meyers, fl, Erik Meyers, org. Fantasmagoria. 2020
- The Dawn's Early Light. Conspirare, Los Angeles Guitar Quartet, cellist Douglas Harvey. The Singing Guitar. Delos, 2019
- Four French Carols. Westminster Brass. Christmas Celebration. Westminster Brass, 2004
- In This Blue Room, Songs of Kile Smith. Lyric Fest. Roven Records, 2018
- my son my son. Khorikos, Across the Open Spaces, 2025
- The Nobility of Women. Mélomanie. Excursions. Meyer Media, 2012
- Northland. Santa Fe Desert Chorale. Roots & Rivers, 2026
- Penmaen Pool, from Poems of Gerard Manley Hopkins. Nancy Ogle, Ginger Yang Hwalek. An Evening with Gerard Manley Hopkins. Capstone, 1999
- A Song of Sonia Sanchez. Latin Fiesta. Amor a la Vida. Latin Fiesta, 2005
- The Stars Shine, from The Consolation of Apollo. The Same Stream. Same Stream, 2015
- Veni Sancte Spiritus, from Vespers. Fine Music. Navona, 2011
- Vespers. Piffaro, The Crossing. Vespers. Navona, 2009
- Where Flames a Word. Chicago Chamber Choir. Live Art. CCC, 2020
- Where Flames a Word. Khorikos. Joy and Grief and Rest. Bandcamp, 2019
- Where Flames a Word. Voces Musicales. MSR Classics, 2018
- Where Flames a Word. The Crossing. It Is Time. Navona, 2011
- Where Flames a Word. Choral Arts Initiative. Tapestry, 2024
