= Antony Cooke =

American astronomer and musician (born 1948)

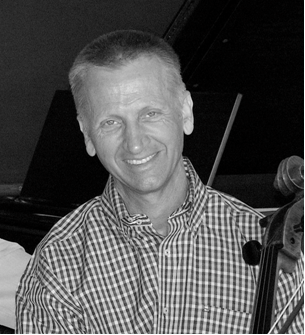
- Antony Cooke

Background information
- Also known as: Tony Cooke
- Born: 3 August 1948 (age 78)
- Origin: Sydney, Australia
- Genre: Classical
- Instrument: Cello
- Years active: 39
- Label: Centaur Records

Antony Cooke (born 3 August 1948), is an American cellist, recording artist, former university professor, composer, and author of published books and articles on musicology and astronomy. Cooke's formal music and musicology training in London and subsequent career as a professional musician and recording artist are complemented by his intensive studies into astronomy.

== Life and career ==
Cooke is the son of cellist Nelson R. Cooke, and was born in Sydney, Australia in 1948 while his father was playing for the Sydney Symphony Orchestra. The family moved to London when his father was appointed principal cellist of the London Symphony Orchestra. Indeed, Nelson Cooke was recognised for his contributions to Australia in particular in 2011, when he was honored by the Governor-General of Australia with The Order of Australia AM, one of the highest awards that an Australian citizen can receive. Antony Cooke shares in his father's selection of the cello as a principal musical instrument; similarly, Antony Cooke has performed as a principal cellist and soloist in concerts throughout Europe and the United States.

Cooke was a protégé of the Helen Just who was both a cellist of the English String Quartet and a professor at the Royal College. Cooke studied theory and historical musicology under John Wilkinson, composition under Nadia Boulanger protégé John Lambert, and conducting under Sir Colin Davis.

In London, Cooke obtained Artist Diplomas from both the Royal College of Music and the Royal Academy of Music. As a young BBC soloist, Cooke was regularly featured as a recitalist and concerto soloist under conductors such as Colin Davis and Harry Blech, including appearances at the Royal Festival Hall, Queen Elizabeth Hall, and Bath International Music Festival. In 1971, he was consequently appointed principal cellist of England's premier chamber orchestra at the time, the London Mozart Players, making Cooke the youngest principal cellist in the country.

=== Move to the United States ===
Cooke moved to the United States in 1974, where he was appointed professor of cello at the University of South Florida. In 1980 Cooke was appointed associate professor of cello at Northwestern University in Chicago, and was a member of the Regenstein Trio during his time there.

In 1984, Cooke moved to Los Angeles, California, where he established himself as a film and television composer. Cooke was the principal cellist in the orchestra that performed the score for Judy Moody and the Not Bummer Summer.

Cooke is a founding member of the Emerson Trio with pianist Donna Coleman and violinist Endre Balogh.

Cooke has authored numerous books and articles on music, astronomy and astrometeorology.

== Public reception ==
=== Record reviews ===
Cooke has been praised for his "sterling abilities, with technical accomplishments ideally counterpoised by a fertile imagination and volcanic temperament" (Fanfare, May 1996). Cooke's recording of Kodály's Solo Cello Sonata, Op. 8, was hailed as "the finest recent performance" by Fanfare (November 1998) Stereo Review (now Sound and Vision), called his recording of the Solo Sonata "vibrant and dedicated" (February 1998).

Mike D. Brownell criticised Cooke's playing for AllMusic, claiming that Cooke "gets carried away musically... So filled with rubato is Cooke's interpretation that the usually powerful, forward-moving piece nearly comes to a stand-still on several occasions. Chords are played with a tiresome delay at the bottom half that makes Cooke's playing predictable."

=== Astronomy book reviews ===
Astronomy Now remarked in May 2004 that Cooke's Visual Astronomy in the Suburbs (2003) is "a must buy for the city astronomer". Southern Stars (Vol. 43 (1), March 2004) stated that this book "should be considered an essential for today's amateur who has to endure light pollution". In 2005, the Journal of the Auckland Astronomical Society commented on Visual Astronomy under Dark Skies, stating that it was "highly recommended for visual observers who want to push their eyeball observing to the limit."

However, Stewart Moore criticised Cooke's explanations of the basic operation of intensifiers in the Journal of the British Astronomical Association, stating that "anyone wanting detailed technical information on the operation of intensifiers will also need to look elsewhere."

On Astronomy and the Climate Crisis, Arthur Upgren for the American Library Association's Choice publication (Vol. 50 (8), April, 2013) wrote: "This book thoroughly covers the ways in which global warming has been studied and conclusions drawn... a valuable addition to the literature; useful for libraries serving schools at the graduate level of study."

== Recordings ==
- Music for Cello and Wind Orchestra (Golden Crest, 1978)
- D. Kabalewsky: Sonata, Pietro Locatelli: Sonata in D; (Armin Watkins, Piano; Golden Crest, 1980)
- A Recital of Music for Violin and Cello. Zoltán Kodály: Duo for Violin and Cello, Op. 7; Bohuslav Martinů: Duo [#2] for Violin and Cello; Handel-Halvorsen: Passacaglia for Violin and Cello; (Myron Kartman, Violin; Golden Crest, 1982)
- Music for Cello and Percussion. Works by David Baker and Niccolò Paganini (Golden Crest, 1983)
- Hungarian Music for Cello and Piano. Works by Ernő Dohnányi, Béla Bartók, Jenő Hubay, Zoltán Kodály (Resort Classic; re-released, Centaur, 1995)
- Splendors of the 20th Century. Works by Ludwig Thuille, Esa-Pekka Salonen and Paul Hindemith (Resort Classic; re-released, Centaur, 1997)
- The Power of the Cello. Works by Aram Khachaturian, Zoltán Kodály, Elizabeth Maconchy & Kessler (Resort Classic, 1997)
- Sergei Rachmaninoff: Sonata in G minor, Op. 19; Dmitry Kabalevsky: Sonata, Op. 71; (Resort Classic; re-released, Centaur, 1999)
- Ludwig van Beethoven: The Complete Works for Cello and Piano (Centaur, 2002)
- Homage to Chopin. Frédéric Chopin: Cello Sonata & misc. (Centaur, 2008)
- Antony Cooke: The Solo Cello. Works by Zoltán Kodály, Aram Khachaturian, Alan Hovhaness and Richard Arnell (Centaur, 2010)
- Johannes Brahms: Three Sonatas for Cello and Piano. (Centaur, 2011)

== Bibliography ==
- Charles Ives: The Making of the Composer (2017)
- Charles Ives and His Road to the Stars, A New Interpretation, Assessment and Guide to the Music and the Man (Estrella Books, 2013)
- Charles Ives and His Road to the Stars, A Guide to the Music and the Man, 2nd ed. (Infinity Publishing, 2016)
- Editor: Beyond the Bow (Estrella Books, 2012)
- Charles Ives's Musical Universe (Infinity Publishing, 2015)
- The Ailments of Charles Ives and his Family (Working Title, Forthcoming Journal Article)
- Visual Astronomy in the Suburbs: A Guide to Spectacular Viewing (Springer, 2003)
- Visual Astronomy Under Dark Skies: A New Approach to Observing Deep Space (Springer, 2005)
- An Approach to Left Hand Articulation; Florida Music Director (May 1983): 10.
- Help with Specialized Bowing Techniques; American String Teacher (Spring 1983): 22–23.
- Left Hand Principles for Cellists; The Instrumentalist (April 1984): 56–59.
- Make Time for the Stars: Fitting Astronomy into Your Busy Life (Springer 2009)
- Dark Nebulae, Dark Lanes, and Dust Lanes (Springer, 2012)
- Astronomy and the Climate Crisis (Springer, 2012)

=== Published compositions ===
- Western Overture (Kendor 1979)
- Herculaneum (Kendor 1979)
- Variation on an English Air (Studio P/R 1985)
- Fantasia on a Traditional Australian Melody (Studio P/R 1985)
- Outback Work Song (Studio P/R 1986)
- Spirit of the Land (Studio P/R 1986)
- Hungarian Dance (Kjos, adapt/arr. 1990)
- Wings (music for NBC TV series; theme adapt/arr Schubert 1991)
