= Gregory W. Brown =

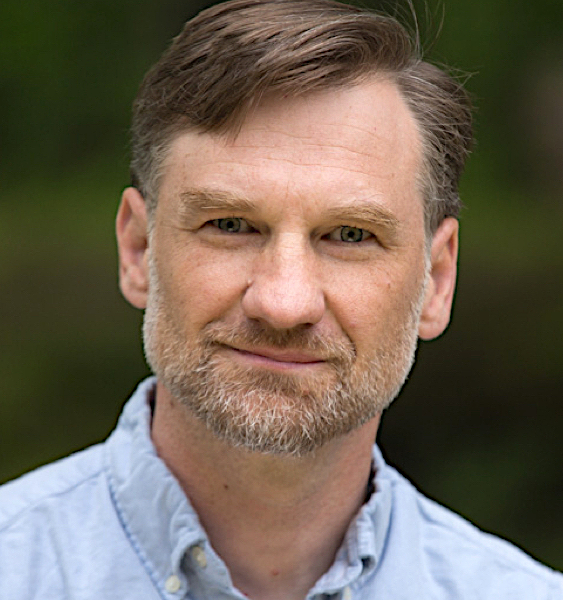
- Gregory W. Brown

Background information
- Born: November 8, 1974 (age 51)
- Origin: Exeter, New Hampshire, United States
- Genre: Classical
- Occupations: Musician, composer, professor
- Instrument: Piano
- Labels: Navona Records, Innova Recordings
- Website: www.gregorywbrown.com

Gregory W. Brown (born 8 November 1974) is an American composer whose works have been performed across the United States and Europe, including Carnegie Hall in New York City, Cadogan Hall in London, and the Concertgebouw in Amsterdam. His commissions for vocal ensemble New York Polyphony have been heard on American Public Media's Performance Today, BBC Radio, Minnesota Public Radio, Kansas Public Radio, and Danish National Radio. Brown is best known for his "Missa Charles Darwin", a work combining the structure of the standard mass with texts from Charles Darwin, which is featured in his brother Dan Brown's 2017 novel Origin.

== Early life ==
Gregory Brown grew up in Exeter, New Hampshire. He is the son of a mathematician father and church organist mother. He attended Phillips Exeter Academy, and as an Amherst College undergraduate, he initially majored in geology, then switched to pursue music instead, becoming a composer and conductor. He holds degrees from the Hugh Hodgson School of Music (University of Georgia), Westminster Choir College, and Amherst College, where he studied with the Pulitzer Prize-winning composer Lewis Spratlan. His older brother is the noted author Dan Brown.

== Missa Charles Darwin ==
"Missa Charles Darwin" is a multi-movement composition by Gregory W. Brown that is scored for unaccompanied male vocal quartet, using texts from Darwin compiled and edited by New York Polyphony bass Craig Phillips. Based on the standard five-movement structure of the Mass, the "Missa Charles Darwin" honors the compositional and harmonic conventions of its musical antecedents. Unlike traditional Mass settings, however, the sacred texts have been replaced with excerpts from On the Origin of Species, The Descent of Man, and Darwin's extant correspondence. Brown's brother also credits this piece as the inspiration for his 2017 best selling novel Origin.

== Selected compositions ==
- Nine Bagatelles for Guitar Trio (2008)
- Moonstrung Air (2015)
- Missa Charles Darwin (Special Edition) (2017)
- Caliban in Afterlife (2017)
- Love (&) Doubt (2017)
- Sweet & Twenty (2017)
- un/bodying/s (2017)

Moonstrung Air, Brown's 2015 CD of original choral and vocal works, was Q2's Album of the Week for Feb 16th ("[Brown's] command of transcendent sound is constant"), and Gapplegate Classical-Modern Review remarked: "The performances are exemplary, the sound excellent and the compositions show us that Gregory W. Brown takes to vocal writing as a natural. The music has eloquence, verve and old-in-new panache."

Brown's latest major work — un/bodying/s — was premiered by Philadelphia choir The Crossing in June 2017. This 35-minute cantata for 24 voices uses new texts by poet Todd Hearon and focuses on issues of displacement and ecology around the creation of the Quabbin Reservoir. Other current and recent commissions include works for the Seattle Bach Choir, Ensemble Nobiles (Leipzig), Boston Choral Ensemble, soprano Mary Hubbell (USA), contralto Kristine Gether (Denmark), countertenor Geoffrey Silver (UK), and others.
