= Santa Ratniece =

Latvian composer (born 1977)

Santa Ratniece (born 1977) is a Latvian composer.

Santa Ratniece was born in Jelgava, and started her musical studies with piano playing classes at Valmiera Music School. In 1992 she took up music theory classes in Emīls Dārziņš College in Riga. She continued her musical education at J. Vītols Latvia Academy of Music and graduated in Musicology (2000) and Composition (2002). Later on she studied composition with English composer David Rowland at Enschede Conservatory in Netherlands. Afterwards Santa Ratniece went on with her studies at Estonian Academy of Music and Theatre with Estonian composer Helena Tulve and in 2007 she obtained her MA. Santa Ratniece first came in public view in 2004 after winning the 1st prize at the UNESCO International Rostrum of Composers (in the category of composers under 30) for her piece "sens nacre" for ensemble, performed by Ensemble Nove and conductor Normunds Šnē.

Ratniece's music has been performed by the Latvian Radio Choir, ensemble Altera Veritas, Trio Palladio, Sinfonietta Rīga, Liepaja Amber Sound Orchestra, Latvian National Symphony orchestra, Orchestra RIGA, Estonian National Male choir, Moravian Philharmonic Orchestra, Cappella Amsterdam, Musiques Nouvelles, Kronos Quartet, Arditti Quartet, Nederlands Kamerkoor, Canadian string quartet Quatuor Molinari, the Sydney Symphony Fellows, International Contemporary Ensemble, Ensemble Recherche, Ensemble Fractales, Ensemble Sarband, Scordatura Ensemble, Lichtzwang Ensemble, Forbidden City Chamber Orchestra, and The Crossing choir, Chamber Choir Ireland, among others.

== Works ==
Selected works include:

- Sens nacre for ensemble (2004) (1-1-1-0/ 0-0-0-0/ 1 batt/ 2 harps (or 2 kokle)/ accordion/ 1-0-1-1-1)
- Ruby for clarinet, piano, violin and cello (2004)
- Glittering Pomenade for orchestra (2005/2016) (2-2-2-2/ 2-2-2-0/ 3 batt/ harp/ celesta/ 12-10-8-6-4)
- Myrrh for piano (2005)
- Aragonite for string quartet (2005)
- Alvéoles for string quartet (2005)
- ... Between the Shores of Our Souls ... (2005) for soprano, flute, kannele and cello
- Saline for mixed choir (2006)
- Olivine for two percussion (2006)
- Ombres chinoises lunaires for trombone and piano (2007)
- Hirondelles du Coeur for mixed choir and orchestra (2007) (2-2-2-2/ 2-2-1-0/ 5 batt/ p-no/ harp/ 8-6-4-4-2)
- Råså for two kokles, flute and accordion (2008)
- Horo horo hata hata for chamber choir (2008)
- Hall kristalltaevas for twelve cellos (2008)
- Chu dal for mixed choir (2008)
- Muqarnas for piano (2009)
- Libellules for clarinet and cello (2009)
- Hummingbirds for flute, harp, accordion and cello (2009)
- Chant des Dunes for organ and percussion (2009)
- Shant Nadi Chamber Symphony for chamber orchestra (2011) (0-2-2-1/ 2-2-0-0/ 1 batt/ 0-2-4-4-2)
- WAR SUM UP. Music. Manga.Machines, multimedia opera (2011) for 12 voices and electronics
- Fuoco celeste for cello and mixed choir (2011)
- Ondulado for five electric guitars (2012)
- In this white snow the pearls are lost (mirdzums) for clarinet, violin and piano (2012)
- Es mīlu mazo, smalko lietu... (2013) for soprano, flute, cello and piano
- Silsila for string quartet (2014)
- Concerto for piano and symphony orchestra (2014) (3-3-3-3/ 4-4-3-1/ 3 batt/ p-no/ celesta/ harpsichord/ harp/ 10-8-6-4-2)
- Nada el Layli (2015) for kemenche, qanun and mixed choir
- My soul will sink within me (2016) for mixed choir and ensemble (1-1-1-1/ 1-0-0-0/ 1 batt/ harp/ 1-1-1-1-1)
- In Love with Liberty for piano (2016)
- El mirollo de l'arbore for soprano and organ (2017)
- Vigilia del Mattino for harp and mixed choir (2017)
- Nattergalen for cello, piano and percussion (2017)
- Blaurackenflugel for ensemble (2017) fl/bass fl. ob. cl/bass cl. 2 vln. v-la. vc. cb.
- Morning Rain for Traditional Chinese orchestra (2017)
- Nebula for traditional Chinese orchestra (2017)
- Stellar wind for church organ (2018)
- mira for harpsichord (2018)
- Aureola for orchestra (2018)
- feu sur glace for violin, viola, cello and piano (2019)
- Leider liegt kaum Schnee for 2 sopranos and string orchestra (2019)
- airglow for Pipa, Yang Qin and Zhong Ruan (2019)
- pļavasfor wind orchestra (2019)
- music for movie NATURAL LIGHT (2020)
- entasis for violin, cello and piano (2021)
- nhofor trumpet, cello and piano (2021)
- I am very happy...for alto, tenor, Khitara and frame drum (2021)
- nakts gaismafor mixed choir (2021)
