= Paul Fowler =

English cricketer

Personal information
- Full name: Paul Albert Fowler
- Born: 12 June 1954 (age 72); Wigan, Lancashire, England
- Batting: Left-handed

Domestic team information
- Years: Team
- 1978–1987: Oxfordshire

Career statistics
Competition	List A
Matches	4
Runs scored	137
Batting average	34.25
100s/50s	1/–
Top score	119
Balls bowled	–
Wickets	–
Bowling average	–
5 wickets in innings	–
10 wickets in match	–
Best bowling	–
Catches/stumpings	–/–
- Source: Cricinfo, 24 May 2011

Paul Albert Fowler (born 12 June 1954) is a former English cricketer. Fowler was a left-handed batsman. He was born in Wigan, Lancashire.

Fowler made his debut for Oxfordshire in the 1978 Minor Counties Championship against Wiltshire. Fowler played Minor counties cricket for Oxfordshire from 1978 to 1987, which included 47 Minor Counties Championship matches and 4 MCCA Knockout Trophy matches. He made his List A debut against Glamorgan in the 1981 NatWest Trophy. He played 3 further List A matches, the last coming against Leicestershire in the 1987 NatWest Trophy. In his 4 List A matches, he scored 137 runs at a batting average of 34.25, with a single century high score of 119. This came against Warwickshire in the 1983 NatWest Trophy.
