= Toivo Tulev =

Estonian composer

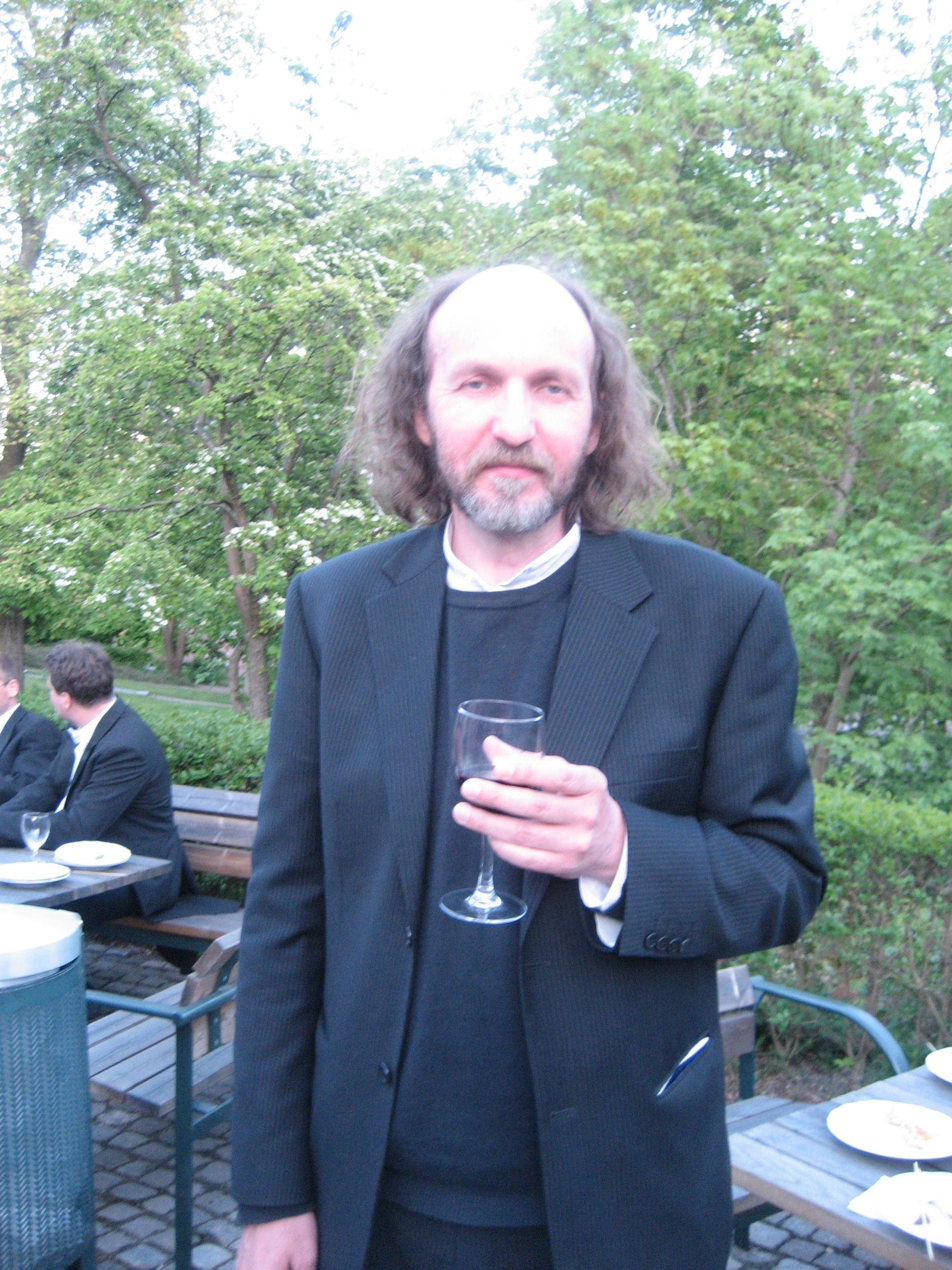
Toivo Tulev

Toivo Tulev (born 18 July 1958) is an Estonian composer. Taught by Eino Tamberg and Swedish composer Sven-David Sandström, he studied electro-acoustic music at the Cologne Hochschule der Musik in 1996. He is the founder (1995) and artistic director of the liturgical music ensemble Scandicus, and the head of the Composition Department at the Estonian Academy of Music.

== Works ==
Toivo Tulev has written for different types and sizes of ensembles. These are listed below.

- "Lamentations" (2011)
- "Magnificat" (2013)
- "So Shall He Descend" (for the Voronov Philharmonic, 2018)
- "I Heard the Voices of Children" (for centenary of LA Philharmonic, 2019)
- "Nada" (2015)
- Violin Concerto "Violin Concerto" (2002)
- Flute Concerto "Deux" (2004
- Cello Concerto "Before" (2006)
- Percussion Concerto (Flow" (2009)
- "Three Symphonies" (2018)
