= Forbidden City Chamber Orchestra =

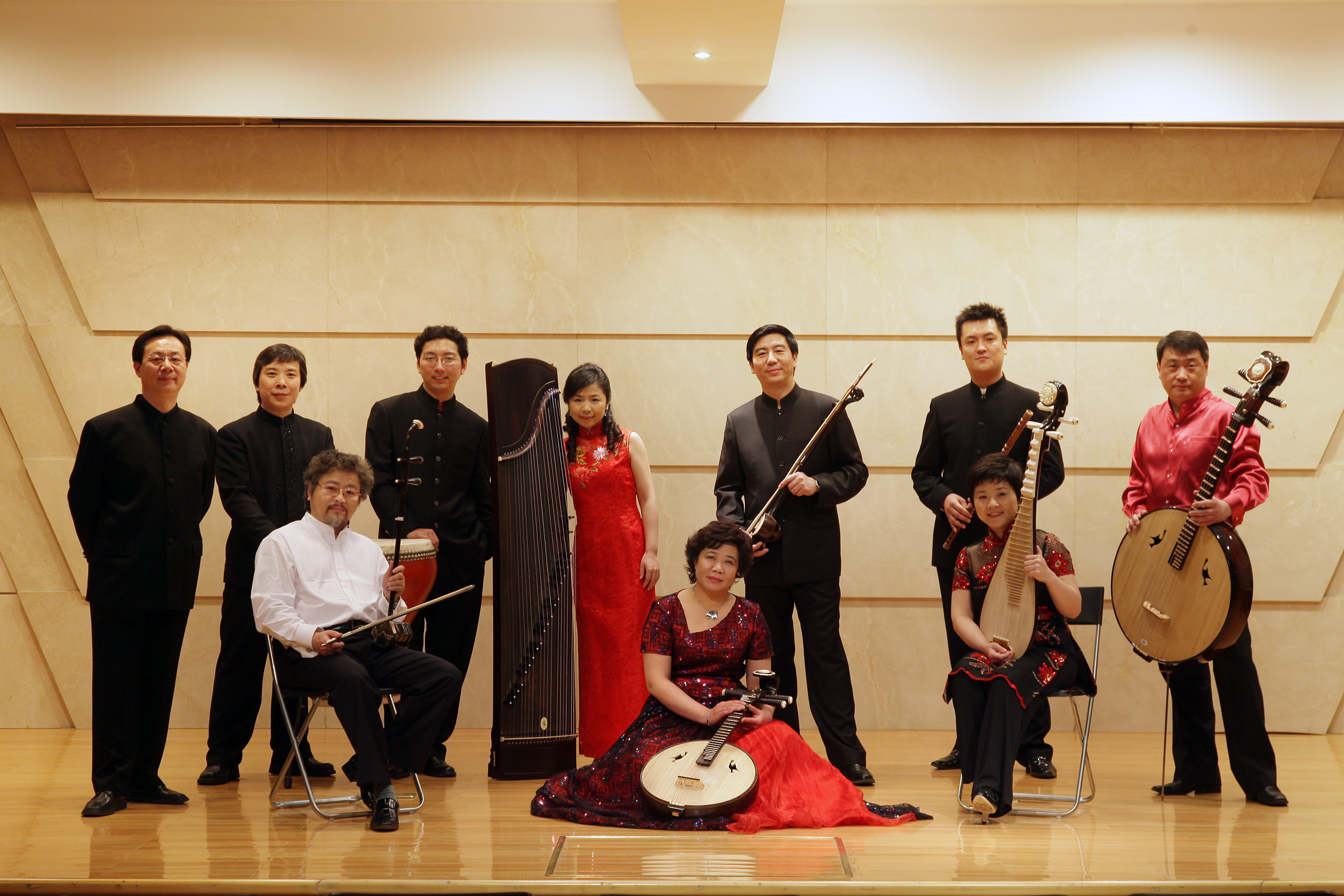
Forbidden City Chamber Orchestra

The Forbidden City Chamber Orchestra (Chinese: 紫禁城室内乐团; pinyin: Zǐjìnchéng Shìnèi Yuètuán) is a chamber orchestra based in Beijing, China, which is composed of eleven classically trained musicians, who interpret elements of Chinese folk music. The intention of the group is to express the changes taking place in contemporary Chinese culture, through the sounds of ancient instruments. It has participated in important national and international music events held in Brisbane, Canberra, Wellington, Christchurch.

== History and organization ==
The Forbidden City Chamber Orchestra was jointly created by pipa player Yang Jing and ten musicians dedicated to traditional instruments. These are graduates of Beijing music schools such as Central Conservatory of Music and the China Music Conservatory. Their repertoire includes folk love songs, songs of sorrow, songs that describe China's landscapes and recited passages. Traditional instruments include the huqin and erhu which are similar to the viola and violin, the sanxian, percussion instruments, flutes and voices.

It has participated in important national and international music events held in Brisbane, Canberra, Wellington, Christchurch, Dunedin and Auckland under the auspices of the “Oriental Express”, a foreign exchange project of the Ministry of Culture.

== Programs ==
The repertoire is divided into two programs. One consists of chamber orchestra pieces, both traditional and newer, and the other is a collection of poetry and readings, punctuated with sounds of traditional instruments.

The programs include each one nine pieces, most of them ancient melodies that also try to express the reflection of life. One of the pieces is Han Ya Xi Shui (Jackdaws Playing in the Water), a traditional Teochew piece that evokes a scene of a group of birds playing in the water on a cold day. It is a metaphor of the optimistic persons in spite of the life's problems. Another one is An Xiang (Subtle Fragrance) by the Southern Song dynasty poet-composer Jiang Kui, They also play The Moon, which is a classic traditional piece created in the 20th century. This composition tries to take the audience into a calm and cold night.

== Musicians ==
The Forbidden City Chamber Orchestra is composed of eleven classically trained musicians, which interpret elements of Chinese folk music.

- Yang Jing is the director and founder of NPFCO, Yang is a professor and tutor of masters students at the China Music Conservatory, and one of the most famous pipa virtuosos in China.
- Liu Shun is the music director and conductor of the New Purple Forbidden City Orchestra, Liu is also professor and tutor of master students at the China Music Conservatory in Beijing. Liu studied at both the Central Conservatory of Music and the China Music Conservatory. He has conducted many different orchestras, including the Chinese Bow String Youth Orchestra, the Chinese Plucked Instruments Youth Orchestra, the China Music Conservatory Chinese Orchestra, the New Music Orchestra of the Central Conservatory of Music, the Singapore Chinese Orchestra, the Guangdong Traditional Music Ensemble and the Hong Kong Chinese Orchestra. Liu has also recorded and produced albums and TV music programs.
- Shen Cheng plays the huqin; he is professor and tutor of master's degree students at the China Music Conservatory. He also holds many other positions, including membership on the Folk Music Committee of the Chinese Musicians' Association, and vice-chairman of the huqin subcommittee within the China Nationalities Orchestra Society.
- Zhang Zunlian is a professor of master's degree students and deputy director of the Instrument Music Department at China Music Conservatory. He is also the vice-director of the huqin subcommittee of the China Nationalities Orchestra Society.
- Zhao Chengwei Plays the sanxian (a three-string musical instrument), member of different Chinese musician associations and the China Nationalities Orchestra Society, and a member of the sanxian section of the Chinese National Occupation Skill Evaluation Committee, Zhao Chengwei currently serves as professor at the China Music Conservatory
- Wei Wei plays the liuqin and ruan. She is a professor at the China Conservatory of Music, where she tutors master's degree students. Wei is also the director of the Ruan Specialty Committee of the China Nationalities Orchestra Society, and a board member of the Liuqin Specialty Committee.
- Jiao Shanlin is a percussionist and professor at the China Conservatory of Music, his skills include proficiency on both Chinese and Western percussion instruments.
- Yang Lin plays the guzheng; she is a lecturer at the China Conservatory of Music, member of the Chinese Musicians Association, member of the Beijing Zheng Academy, and a board member of the Konghou Specialty Committee of the China Nationalities Orchestra Society.
- Luo Yuan was admitted to the China Conservatory in 1992, and is a lecturer at the China Conservatory of Music. She studied study under Prof. Zuhua Xiang, receiving her bachelor's degree in 1996, and worked as a cimbalom teacher at the Middle School attached to the China Conservatory from then onwards. She obtained her master's degree in 2002.
