= Donald Nally =

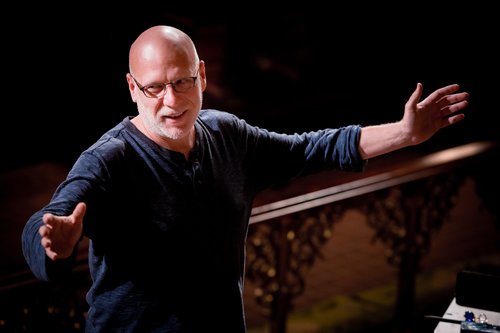

Background information
- Born: December 27, 1960 (age 65); Hilltown, Pennsylvania, USA
- Occupation: conductor
- Years active: 1996–present

Donald Nally (born December 27, 1960) is an American conductor, chorus master, and professor of conducting, specializing in chamber choirs, opera, and new music. Nally has been nominated for 11 Grammy Awards, of which he has won 4. He is the current visiting professor of conducting & ensembles and interim director of choral activities at Eastman School of Music, and conductor of the professional new-music choir, The Crossing, based in Philadelphia.

Nally has been chorus master of Lyric Opera of Chicago, Welsh National Opera, Opera Philadelphia, and the Festival dei Due Mondi in Spoleto, Italy.

He has been nominated eleven times for the Grammy Award for Best Choral Performance, winning in 2018, 2019, 2023, and 2025. He has won numerous awards and is recognized as one of the leading commissioners of new music in the United States.

== Early life and education ==
Nally was born in Hilltown, Pennsylvania, and educated at the University of Cincinnati College-Conservatory of Music (BM, music education), Westminster Choir College (MM, choral conducting), and the University of Illinois (DMA, choral conducting). In 2019, he was awarded an Honorary Doctorate of Humanities from Westminster Choir College of Rider University. He has been Artist in Residence at Washington and Lee University and Shorter University, has been on the faculty of the University of Illinois, and has been guest lecturer at Indiana University and the College-Conservatory of Music at the University of Cincinnati.

== Professional life ==
Nally’s first professional chamber choir was The Bridge Ensemble, which sang concerts from 1996 to 1997; though it failed financially, it established a significant presence in Philadelphia, receiving a great amount of critical attention and laying the groundwork for the success of The Crossing.

From 1998 to 2002, he was Artistic Director of the Choral Arts Society of Philadelphia, during which time the chorus received Chorus America’s 2002 Margaret Hillis National Award for Excellence and was chosen as “The Best of Philadelphia” by Philadelphia Magazine.

At the end of 2002, Nally left Philadelphia and moved to Wales to become the chorus master at Welsh National Opera. In 2006, Nally returned to the United States to become the chorus master for the Lyric Opera of Chicago.

Nally has guest conducted the Swedish Radio Choir, the Latvian State Choir, the Grant Park Symphony Chorus, and the Santa Fe Desert Chorale; he has prepared choirs for the New York Philharmonic, the Los Angeles Philharmonic, Philharmonia Orchestra, the BBC Symphony Orchestra, the Philadelphia Orchestra (including the world premiere of Hannibal’s One Heart Beating), the Pennsylvania Ballet, the Illinois Symphony Orchestra, and Spoleto USA. Nally collaborates often on living-art installations with the artists Allora & Calzadilla, with scores by David Lang, which have been staged in Frankfurt, Osaka, Edmonton, Cleveland, Córdoba, London, Philadelphia, and Houston. He was music director for Lang's The Mile-Long Opera, overseeing a thousand singers on The High Line in Manhattan.

=== The Crossing ===
The ensemble began in 2005 when Nally and a group of friends sang an informal concert together. At the end of the 2010-11 season, Nally left Lyric Opera of Chicago and moved back to Philadelphia to focus on his Philadelphia ensemble, The Crossing, which specializes in contemporary works. It has received numerous awards, including the Chorus America/ASCAP Award for Adventurous Programming (2009, 2011 & 2017), the American Composers Forum 2017 Champion of New Music Award, the 2018 Grammy Award for Best Choral Performance, and the 2019 Grammy Award for Best Choral Performance.

=== Northwestern University ===
In September 2012, Nally joined the faculty of the Bienen School of Music at Northwestern University in Evanston, Illinois as a tenured professor and director of choral organizations. He was appointed following the retirement of longtime professor Dr. Robert A. Harris, who held the position for the 35 years previous to Nally's appointment. Upon arriving in Evanston in the fall of 2012 Nally founded the chamber choir BCE, a premier group of 26 singers dedicated to performing choral music of the 21st century and drawing relationships to its polyphonic roots in early music – primarily that of the Renaissance.

The ensemble has sung several times on the Chicago Symphony Orchestra MusicNOW series and appeared at both of Chicago's Ear Taxi festivals.

In 2013, Nally rehearsed Howard Hanson's Song of Democracy, which sets texts from various poems of Walt Whitman. An African American student objected to performing the work because he claimed Whitman was racist. Nally told the student he would receive a failing grade if he did not perform the work. The student claimed that a failing grade would have led to the loss of his scholarship.

=== Westminster Choir College ===
In 2022, Nally became an artist in residence at Westminster Choir College, the school of music of Rider University, in Lawrenceville, NJ. In 2024, he joined the full time faculty as a member of the Performance Studies Department, and in January, 2025, he was named Director of Choral Studies for Westminster. In that capacity, he conducted both the Westminster Choir and the Westminster Symphonic Choir as well as teaching the Choral Conducting graduate students.

== Awards and distinctions ==
- 2026 Nomination Grammy Award for Best Choral Performance for Lang: Poor Hymnal (The Crossing)
- 2025 Grammy Award for Best Choral Performance for Ochre (The Crossing)
- 2024 Nomination Grammy Award for Best Choral Performance for Carols After a Plague (The Crossing)
- 2023 Grammy Award for Best Choral Performance for Born (The Crossing)
- 2022 Nomination Grammy Award for Best Choral Performance for Rising w/ The Crossing (The Crossing)
- 2021 Nomination Grammy Award for Best Choral Performance for Carthage (The Crossing)
- 2020 Nomination Grammy Award for Best Choral Performance for The Arc in the Sky (The Crossing)
- 2020 Nomination Grammy Award for Best Choral Performance for Voyages (The Crossing)
- 2019 Honorary Doctorate, Rider University
- 2019 Grammy Award for Best Choral Performance for Zealot Canticles (The Crossing)
- 2018 Grammy Award for Best Choral Performance for The Fifth Century (The Crossing)
- 2017 Champion of New Music Award with The Crossing from American Composers Forum
- 2017 Michael Korn Founders Award for Development of the Professional Choral Art from Chorus America
- 2017 Nomination Grammy Award for Best Choral Performance for Bonhoeffer (The Crossing)
- 2012 Louis Botto Award for Innovative Action and Entrepreneurial Zeal from Chorus America
- 2002 & 2015 Margaret Hillis National Award for Excellence in Choral Music (Choral Arts Society of Philadelphia, 2002 and The Crossing, 2015)

== Works ==
=== Publications ===
- "Gian Carlo Menotti: A Centennial Tribute", Voice Prints: Journal of the New York Teachers’ of Singing Association (January–February 2011).
- Conversations with Joseph Flummerfelt: Thoughts on Conducting, Music and Musicians (2010, Scarecrow Press; ISBN 9-780-81086976-9)
- "To immerse myself in words: Text and Music in the Choral Works of Samuel Barber." DMA dissertation, University of Illinois, 1995.
- "Barber's Op. 42: The poetry and music as key to his musical animus; Part I: Laurie Lee's Twelfth Night; Part II: Louise Bogan's To be sung on the water." Choral Journal 47.4 (October 2006).

=== Musical Compositions ===
- Eclipse (2021), composed with Kevin Vondrak, on the poetry of Angela Jackson, an outdoor work for choir, lakefront, and full moon
- You Can Plan on Me (2020), for SATB choir at Christmas
- The Forest (2020), composed with Kevin Vondrak, an outdoor work for choir and ECHOES amplification kits
- Jesus Christ the Apple Tree (2003), for SATB choir

== Discography ==
- Besieged, The Crossing (Navona Records, 2026)
- Aaron Helgeson, The Book of Never, The Crossing (Navona Records, 2026)
- Gabriel Jackson, RIGWRECK, The Crossing (Navona Records, 2026)
- David Lang, the sense of senses, The Crossing (Cantaloupe Music, 2025)
- Ted Hearne, Farming, The Crossing (Deathbomb Arc, 2025)
- At Which Point, The Crossing (New Focus Recordings, 2025)
- David Lang, poor hymnal, The Crossing (Cantaloupe Music, 2024)
- Meciendo, The Crossing (Navona Records, 2024)
- Ways You Went, The Crossing with PRISM Saxophone Quartet and Scott Dettra (Navona Records, 2024)
- Ochre, The Crossing (Navona Records, 2024)
- Motion Studies, The Crossing (Navona Records, 2024)
- David Shapiro, Sumptuous Planet, The Crossing (New Focus, 2023)
- Shara Nova, Titration, The Crossing (Navona Records, 2023)
- Carols After a Plague, The Crossing (New Focus, 2022)
- Tyondai Braxton, Telekinesis, The Crossing (Nonesuch, 2022)
- John Luther Adams, Sila: The Breath of the World, The Crossing with JACK Quartet (Cantaloupe Music, 2022)
- Born, The Crossing (Navona Records, 2022)
- Words Adorned, The Crossing with Dalal Abu Amneh and Al-Bustan Takht Ensemble (Navona Records, 2021)
- The Tower and the Garden, The Crossing (Navona Records, 2021)
- Rising w/ The Crossing, The Crossing (New Focus Recordings, 2020)
- James Primosch, Carthage, The Crossing (Navona Records, 2020)
- Michael Gordon, Anonymous Man, The Crossing (Cantaloupe Music, 2020)
- Julia Wolfe, Fire in my mouth, The Crossing with New York Philharmonic and Young People's Chorus of New York City (Decca Gold, 2019)
- Voyages, The Crossing (Innova Records, 2019)
- Kile Smith, The Arc in the Sky, The Crossing (Navona Records, 2019)
- Evolutionary Spirits, The Crossing (Navona Records, 2019)
- Lansing McLoskey, Zealot Canticles, The Crossing (Innova Records, 2018);2019 Grammy Award for Best Choral Performance
- If There Were Water, The Crossing (Innova Records, 2018)
- John Luther Adams, Canticles of the Holy Wind, The Crossing (Cantaloupe Music, 2017)
- Ted Hearne, Sound from the Bench, The Crossing (Cantaloupe Music, 2017)
- Edie Hill, Clay Jug, The Crossing (Navona Records, 2016)
- Seven Responses, The Crossing with International Contemporary Ensemble (Innova Records, 2016)
- Gavin Bryars, The Fifth Century, PRISM Saxophone Quartet and The Crossing (ECM Records, 2016); 2018 Grammy Award for Best Choral Performance
- Thomas Lloyd, Bonhoeffer, The Crossing (Albany Records, 2016); Grammy-nominated in the category of Best Choral Performance, 2017
- Gregory W Brown: Moonstrung Air, The Crossing, New York Polyphony (Navona Records, 2015)
- Lewis Spratlan, Hesperus is Phosphorus, Network for New Music and The Crossing (Innova Records, 2015)
- Christmas Daybreak, The Crossing, The Choir of St. Paul's Church (Chestnut Hill) (Innova Records, 2013)
- I Want to Live, The Trebles of The Crossing (Innova Records, 2013)
- It Is Time, The Crossing (Navona Records, 2011)
- Kile Smith, Vespers, Piffaro, The Renaissance Band and The Crossing (Navona Records, 2008)
- Gian Carlo Menotti, The Saint of Bleecker Street, Choir and Orchestra of the Festival dei Due Mondi (Chandos, 2002)
- Gian Carlo Menotti, Cantatas, Choir and Orchestra of the Festival dei Due Mondi (Chandos, 2002)
- Choral Music of Longing and Lament, The Bridge Ensemble (Bridge Ensemble, 1997)
