= Gabriel Jackson (composer) =

English composer (born 1962)

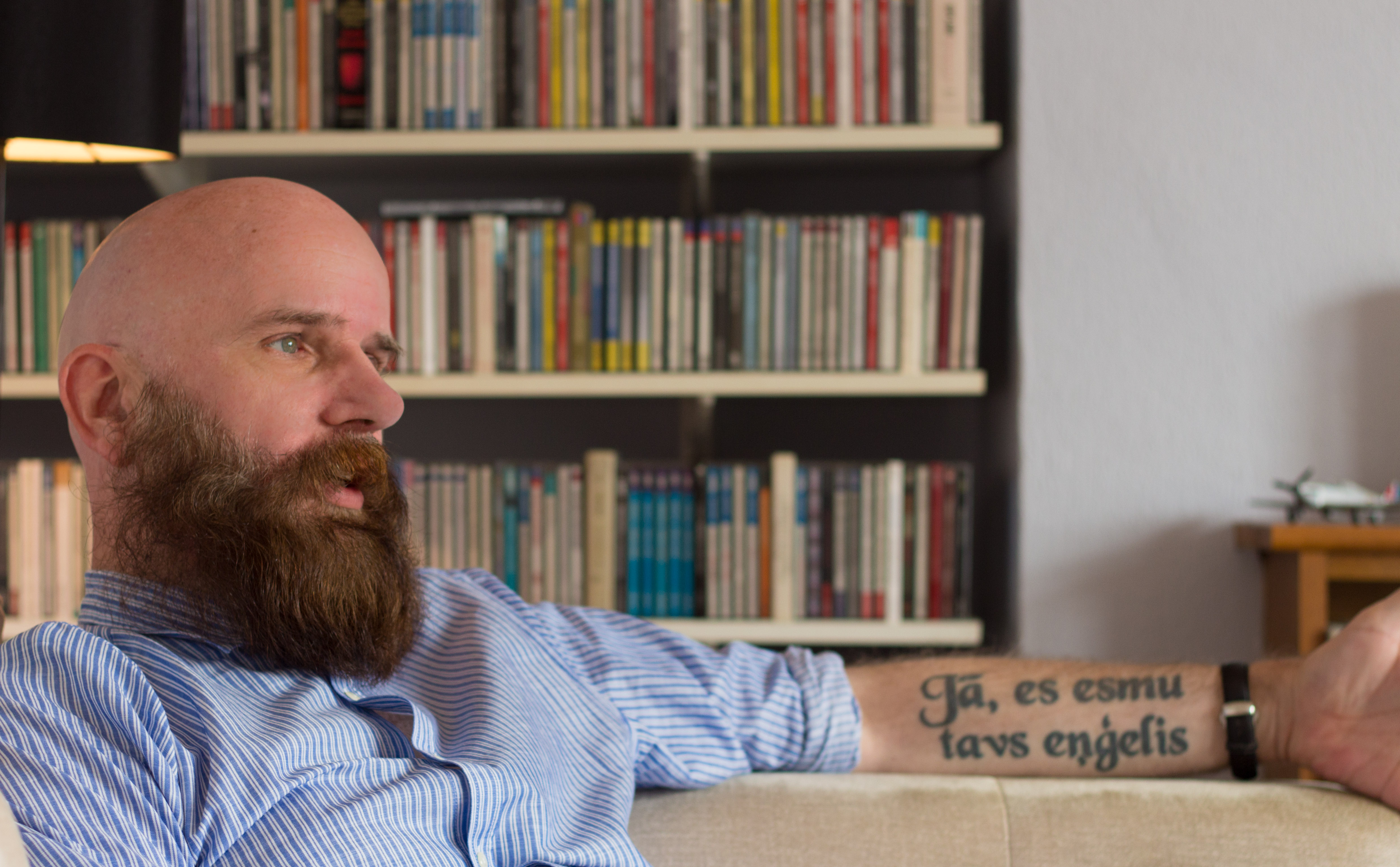
Composer Gabriel Jackson. September 2014, London, UK.

Gabriel Jackson (born 1962 in Hamilton, Bermuda) is an English composer. He is a three-time winner of the British Academy of Songwriters, Composers and Authors British Composer Award.

Jackson was a chorister at Canterbury Cathedral before studying composition at the Royal College of Music, first under Richard Blackford, then with John Lambert. He was awarded the R.O. Morris Prize for Composition in 1981 and 1983, and in 1981 also won the Theodore Holland Award.

Jackson's work includes a significant body of organ compositions, piano and other instrumental works, but he is probably best known for his vocal music, especially for his deft use of text. While he cites Michael Tippett and Igor Stravinsky as influences, he is also drawn to soul and R&B, and this influence is noticeable in his music. Notable compositions include the commissioned piece for the 2009 Festival of Nine Lessons and Carols at King's College, Cambridge, a new work to celebrate the 40th anniversary of the Tallis Scholars in 2012 and a full-length Passion for Merton College, Oxford in 2013. From 2010-2013 he was associate composer to the BBC Singers.

Philip Barnes of Choral Journal describes him as "prominent among his British contemporaries by reason of a prolific output and engaging style".
