= Grammy Award for Best Choral Performance =

Honor presented at the Grammy Awards

- Awarded for: quality choral performances
- Country: United States
- Presented by: National Academy of Recording Arts and Sciences
- First award: 1961
- Currently held by: Uusinta Ensemble – Saariaho: Reconnaissance (2024)
- Website: grammy.com

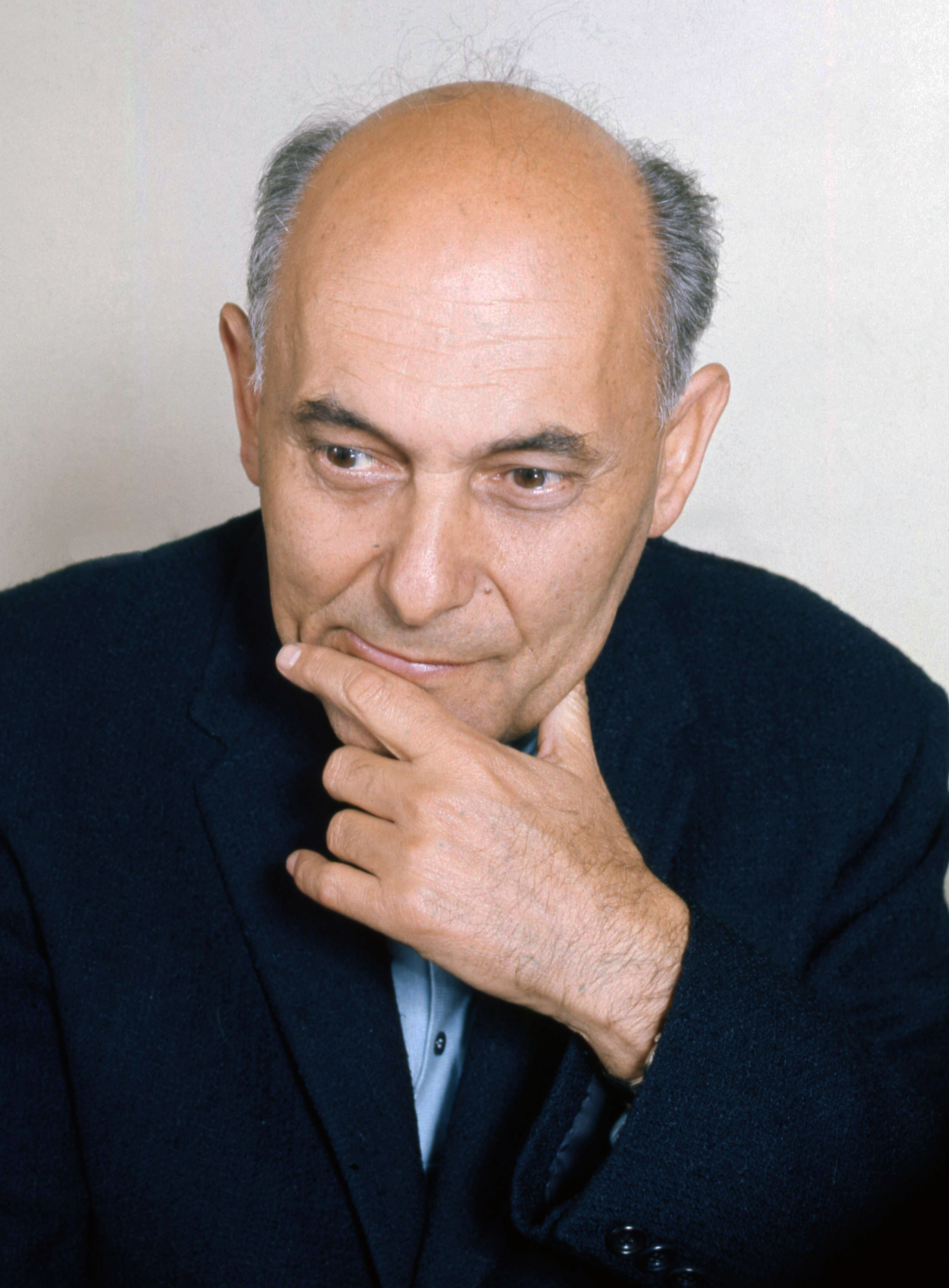
Sir Georg Solti

The Grammy Award for Best Choral Performance has been awarded since 1961. There have been several minor changes to the name of the award over this time:

- In 1961 the award was known as Best Classical Performance - Choral (including oratorio)
- From 1962 to 1964 it was awarded as Best Classical Performance - Choral (other than opera)
- In 1965, 1969, 1971, 1977 to 1978 and 1982 to 1991 it was awarded as Best Choral Performance (other than opera)
- From 1966 to 1968 it was awarded as Best Classical Choral Performance (other than opera)
- In 1970, 1973 to 1976 and 1979 to 1981 it was awarded as Best Choral Performance, Classical (other than opera)
- In 1972 it was awarded as Best Choral Performance - Classical
- From 1992 to 1994 it was awarded as Best Performance of a Choral Work
- 1995 to the present the award has been known as Best Choral Performance

Prior to 1961 the awards for opera and choral performances were combined into a single award for Best Classical Performance, Operatic or Choral.

The award goes to the Conductor, and to the Choral Director and/or Chorus Master where applicable and to the Choral Organization/Ensemble, the producer(s) and the engineer(s). The ensembles, producers and engineers do not receive a nomination, but they are eligible for an award.

Years reflect the year in which the Grammy Awards were presented, for works released in the previous year. Performers who were not eligible for an award (such as orchestras, soloists or choirs) are mentioned between brackets. From 2017, the choral organization/ensemble does receive an Award.

== Recipients ==
Year^{[I]}	Recipient(s)	Work	Performing artist(s)	Nominees Performing artist(s) in parentheses	Ref.
1961	Thomas Beecham (conductor)	Handel: Messiah	Royal Philharmonic Orchestra & Chorus	Verdi: Requiem (Vienna Philharmonic Society of Friends and Vienna Philharmonic Orchestra); Vaughan Williams: Mass In G Minor/Bach: Christ Lay In The Bonds Of Death (Roger Wagner Chorale); Maria Stader, Sieglinde Wagner, Hans Ernst Haefliger, Kim Borg – Dvorak: Requiem; Charles Munch – Berlioz: Requiem (New England Conservatory Chorus); Bach: Motet No. 3 (Jesu Meine Freude) (Robert Shaw Chorale); Arias, Anthems and Chorales of American Moravians, Vol. 1 (Moravian Festival Chorus)	
1962	Robert Shaw (choir director)	Bach: B Minor Mass	Robert Shaw Orchestra & Chorale	F. Austin Walter, director; Eugene Ormandy, conductor – Walton: Belshazzar's Feast (Rutgers University Choir and Philadelphia Orchestra); Roger Wagner, director; Alfred Wallenstein, conductor – Respighi: Laud to the Nativity; Monteverdi: Magnificat (Roger Wagner Chorale and Los Angeles Philharmonic); Yvonne Gouverné, director; Georges Pretre, conductor – Poulenc: Gloria in G Major for Soprano Solo, Chorus and Orchestra (French National Radio-Television Chorus and Orchestra); Colin Davis, conductor – Berlioz: L'Enfance du Christ (St. Anthony Singers and Goldsbrough Orchestra); Warren Martin, director; Leonard Bernstein, conductor – Beethoven: Missa Solemnis (Westminster Choir and New York Philharmonic)	
1963	Otto Klemperer (conductor); Wilhelm Pitz (choir director)	Bach: St. Matthew Passion	Philharmonia Orchestra & Chorus	Lorna Cooke de Varon, director; Charles Munch, conductor – Berlioz: Romeo et Juliette (New England Conservatory Chorus and Boston Symphony Orchestra); Roger Wagner, conductor – Faure: Requiem (Roger Wagner Chorale and Orchestre de la Societe des Concerts du Conservatoire de Paris); Ardean Watts, director; Maurice Abravanel, conductor – Honegger: King David (Le Roi David) (Utah University Chorus and Utah Symphony Orchestra); Warren Martin, director; Thomas Schippers, conductor – Prokofiev: Alexander Nevsky, Op. 78 (Westminster Choir and New York Philharmonic)	
1964	Benjamin Britten (conductor); Edward Chapman, David Willcocks (choir directors)	Britten: War Requiem	Bach Choir, Highgate School Choir & the London Symphony Orchestra & Choir	Leonard Bernstein, conductor; Abraham Kaplan and Stuart Gardner, choir directors – Bach: St. Matthew Passion (Church of Transfiguration Boy's Choir, Collegiate Chorale and New York Philharmonic); Eugene Ormandy, conductor; Richard Condie, choir director – Brahms: A German Requiem (Mormon Tabernacle Choir and Philadelphia Orchestra); David Willcocks – Haydn: Nelson Mass (Mass No. 9 in D Minor, Missa Solemnis) (King's College Choir and London Symphony Orchestra); Leonard Bernstein, conductor; Hugh Ross, choir director – Milhaud: Les Choephores (New York Schola Cantorum and New York Philharmonic)	
1965	Robert Shaw (choir director)	Britten: A Ceremony of Carols	Robert Shaw Chorale	Elliott Forbes, Alfred Nash Patterson, Lorna Cooke De Varon, Rt. Rev. Russell H. Davis, choir directors – "Mozart: Requiem Mass In D Minor (Harvard Glee Club-Radcliffe Choral Society, New England Conservatory Chorus, Pro Musica Chorus & St. John's Seminary Choir; Boston Symphony Orchestra); Eugene Ormandy, conductor; George Lynn, choir director – Verdi: Requiem Mass (Westminster Choir; Philadelphia Orchestra); Igor Stravinsky, conductor; Elmer Iseler, choir director – Stravinsky: Symphony of Psalms (Toronto Festival Chorus; Canadian Broadcasting Corp. Orchestra); Georges Pretre, conductor; Rene Duclos, choir director – Poulenc: Stabat Mater (Rene Chorus Duclos; Paris Conservatory Orchestra)	
1966	Robert Shaw (conductor)	Stravinsky: Symphony of Psalms/Poulenc: Gloria	Robert Shaw Chorale & the RCA Victor Symphony Orchestra	Eugene Ormandy, conductor; Robert Page, choir director – Berlioz: Requiem (Temple University Choir; Philadelphia Orchestra); Herbert von Karajan, conductor – Brahms: A German Requiem (Vienna Singverein Chorus; Berlin Philharmonic Orchestra); Benjamin Britten, conductor – Britten: Cantata Misericordium (London Symphony Chorus and Orchestra); Rafael Kubelik, conductor; Wolfgang Schubert, choir director – Schoenberg: Gurre Lieder (Bavarian Radio Symphony Chorus; Bavarian Radio Symphony Orchestra)	
1967	Robert Shaw (conductor)	Handel: Messiah	Robert Shaw Chorale and Orchestra	Otto Klemperer, conductor; Wilhelm Pitz, choir director – Beethoven: Missa Solemnis in D Major (New Philharmonia Chorus; New Philharmonia Orchestra); Eugene Ormandy, conductor; Richard Condie, choir director – Bless This House (Mormon Tabernacle Choir; Philadelphia Orchestra); Colin Davis, conductor – Handel: Messiah (London Symphony Orchestra and Choir)	
1967	Gregg Smith (conductor); George Bragg (choir director) (Note: In the page for the winners and nominees of the 9th Grammy Awards, Gregg Smith and George Bragg appear as the winners of the award – Ives: Music for Chorus, but according to the source linked in the table, Robert Shaw was the recipient of the award that year. Upon checking the artists page for each at the Grammys official site, all three appear with the award.)	Ives: Music for Chorus	Ithaca College Concert Choir, Gregg Smith Singers & Texas Boys Choir; Columbia Chamber Orchestra	Otto Klemperer, conductor; Wilhelm Pitz, choir director – Beethoven: Missa Solemnis in D Major (New Philharmonia Chorus; New Philharmonia Orchestra); Eugene Ormandy, conductor; Richard Condie, choir director – Bless This House (Mormon Tabernacle Choir; Philadelphia Orchestra); Colin Davis, conductor – Handel: Messiah (London Symphony Orchestra and Choir)	
1968	Leonard Bernstein (conductor)	Mahler: Symphony No. 8 in E Flat Major (Symphony of a Thousand)	London Symphony Orchestra & Choir	Aaron Copland, choir director – Copland: In the Beginnina; Lark; Las Agachadas (New England Conservatory Chorus); Charles Mackerras, conductor; John McCarthy, choir director – Handel: Messiah (Ambrosian Singers; English Chamber Orchestra); Karl Bohm, conductor – Haydn: The Seasons (Vienna Singverein and Vienna Symphony)	
1968	Eugene Ormandy (conductor), Robert Page (choir director)	Orff: Catulli Carmina	Temple University Choir & the Philadelphia Orchestra	Aaron Copland, choir director – Copland: In the Beginnina; Lark; Las Agachadas (New England Conservatory Chorus); Charles Mackerras, conductor; John McCarthy, choir director – Handel: Messiah (Ambrosian Singers; English Chamber Orchestra); Karl Bohm, conductor – Haydn: The Seasons (Vienna Singverein and Vienna Symphony)	
1969	Vittorio Negri (conductor), George Bragg, Gregg Smith, (choir directors)	The Glory of Gabrieli	Gregg Smith Singers & Texas Boys Choir	Charles Munch, conductor – Berlioz: Requiem (Bavarian Radio Chorus and Symphony); Stephen Simon, conductor – Handel: Solomon (Vienna Jeunesse Chorus and Vienna Volksoper Orchestra); Leonard Bernstein, conductor; Abraham Kaplan, choir director – Haydn: The Creation (Camerata Singers; New York Philharmonic); Colin Davis, conductor – Mozart: Requiem (John Alldis Choir and BBC Symphony); Morton Gould, conductor; John McCarthy, choir director – Shostakovich: Symphony No. 2in C Major; Symphony No. 3 in E Flat Major (Ambrosian Singers; Royal Philharmonic Orchestra)	
1970	Luciano Berio (conductor), Ward Swingle (choir director)	Berio: Sinfonia	The Swingle Singers & the New York Philharmonic	Nikolaus Harnoncourt, conductor; Hans Gillesberger, choir director – Bach: Mass In B Minor (Vienna Boys Choir & Viennensis Chorus; Concentus Musicus); Colin Davis, conductor – Berlioz: Romeo Et Juliette (John Alldis Choir; London Symphony Orchestra and Chorus); Gregg Smith, conductor – Billings: The Continental Harmony (Gregg Smith Singers); Charles Groves, conductor; Edmund Walters, choir director – Delius: Songs of Sunset (Royal Liverpool Philharmonic Choir and Orchestra); Hans Werner Henze, choir director – Henze: The Raft of the Frigate Medusa (North German Radio Choirs & St. Nicolai Boy's Chorus; North German Radio Symphony); Adrian Boult, conductor; Frederick Jackson, choir director – Vaughan Williams: Symphony No. 1 (A Sea Symphony) (London Philharmonic Choir; London Philharmonic)	
1971	Gregg Smith (choir director),	Ives: New Music of Charles Ives	Gregg Smith Singers & Columbia Chamber Ensemble	Herbert von Karajan, conductor; Reinhold Schmid, Helmut Froschauer, choir directors – Haydn: The Creation (Vienna Singverein and Berlin Philharmonic); Pierre Boulez, conductor; Arthur Oldham, choir director – Mahler: Das Klagende Lied (London Symphony Orchestra and Chorus); Seiji Ozawa, conductor; Lorna Cooke de Varon, Katherine Edmonds Pusztai, choir directors – Orff: Carmina Burana (New England Conservatory Chorus; Children's Chorus of the New England Conservatory; Boston Symphony); Eugene Ormandy, conductor; Robert E. Page, choir director – Shostakovich: Symphony No. 13 (Male Chorus of the Mendelssohn Club of Philadelphia; Philadelphia Symphony); Robert Craft, conductor; Gregg Smith, choir director – The New Stravinsky (Ithaca College Concert Choir; Columbia Symphony)	
1972	Colin Davis (conductor); Russell Burgess, Arthur Oldham (choir directors)	Berlioz: Requiem	Wandsworth School Boys Choir & London Symphony Orchestra & Chorus	Eugene Ormandy, conductor; Robert Page, choir director – Penderecki: Utrenjan, the Entombment of Christ (Temple University Choirs; Philadelphia Orchestra); Gennady Rozhdestvensky, conductor – Prokofiev: Seven, They Are Seven (Moscow Radio Symphony); Paavo Berglund, conductor; Ensti Pohjola, choir director – Sibelius: Kullervo, Op. 7 (Helsinki University Men's Choir; Bournemouth Symphony); Wolfgang Frommc, conductor – Stockhausen: Stimmung (Collegium Vocale of Cologne)	
1973	Georg Solti (conductor)	Mahler: Symphony No. 8 in E Flat (Symphony of a Thousand)	Vienna Boys Choir, Vienna Singverein Chorus & Vienna State Opera Chorus; Chicago Symphony Orchestra	Leonard Bernstein, conductor – Bernstein: Mass (Berkshire Boys Choir & Norman Scribner Chorus; Berkshire Orchestra); Charles Groves, conductor – Delius: A Mass of Life (London Philharmonic Choir and Orchestra); Raymond Leppard, conductor – Monteverdi: Madrigals, Books 8-10 (Glyndebourne Opera Chorus, Ambrosian Singers, English Chamber Orchestra); Andre Previn, conductor – Prokofiev: Alexander Nevsky (London Symphony Chorus and Orchestra); Vittorio Negri, conductor; E. Power Biggs, Gregg Smith, choir directors – The Glory of Venice (Gabrielli in San Marco - Music for Multiple Choirs, Brass and Organ) (Gregg Smith Singers & Texas Boys Choir; Tarr Brass Ensemble)	
1974	André Previn (conductor), Arthur Oldham (choir director)	Walton: Belshazzar's Feast	London Symphony Orchestra & Chorus	Herbert von Karajan, conductor; Helmuth Froschauer, choir director – Bach: St. Matthew Passion (Vienna Singverein and Berlin Philharmonic); Eugen Jochum, choir director – Beethoven: Missa Solemnis (Netherlands Radio Chorus; Concertgebouw Orchestra - Amsterdam); Benjamin Britten, conductor; David Willcocks, choir director – Elgar: The Dream of Gerontius (King's College Choir-Cambridge; London Symphony Orchestra); Leonard Bernstein, conductor; Norman Scribner, choir director – Haydn: Mass in Time of War (Leonard Bernstein's Concert for Peace) (Norman Scribner Choir; New York Philharmonic)	
1975	Colin Davis (conductor)	Berlioz: The Damnation of Faust	Ambrosian Singers, Wandsworth School Boys Choir & London Symphony Orchestra & Chorus	Sir Adrian Boult, conductor – Holst: Choral Symphony (London Philharmonic Choir and Orchestra); Rudolf Kempe, conductor – Janacek: Glagolitic Mass (Slavonic Mass) (Royal Philharmonic and Brighton Festival Chorus); Jozef Bok, Wladyslaw Skoraczewski, Andrzej Markowski, choir director – Penderecki: Utrenja (Chorus of National Philharmonic & Pioneer Choir; Symphony Orchestra of National Philharmonic); Eugene Ormandy, conductor; Robert Page, choir director – Rachmaninov: The Bells (Philadelphia Orchestra; Temple University Choirs)	
1976	Michael Tilson Thomas (conductor), Robert Page (choir director)	Orff: Carmina Burana	Cleveland Boys Choir & Cleveland Orchestra Chorus	Herbert von Karajan, choir director – Beethoven: Missa Solemnis (Vienna Singverein and Berlin Philharmonic); Seiji Ozawa, conductor; John Oliver, Theodore Marier, choir director – Berlioz: La Damnation de Faust (Boston Boys Choir & Tanglewood Festival Chorus; Boston Symphony Orchestra); Riccardo Muti, conductor; John McCarth, choir director – Cherubini: Requiem in D Minor for Male Chorus and Orchestra (Ambrosian Singers; New Philharmonia Orchestra); Leonard Bernstein, conductor – Haydn: Harmoniemesse (Westminster Choir and New York Philharmonic)	
1977	André Previn (conductor), Arthur Oldham (choir director)	Rachmaninoff: The Bells	London Symphony Orchestra & Chorus	Carlo Maria Giulini, conductor; Walter Hagen-Groll, choir director – Beethoven: Missa Solemnis (New Philharmonia Chorus and London Philharmonic); Leonard Bernstein, choir director – Berlioz: Requiem (Choeurs de Radio France; Orchestre National de France & Orchestre Philharmonique de Radio France); Phillip Ledger, choir director – Bernstein: Chichester Psalms/Britten: Rejoice in the Lamb (King's College Choir-Cambridge); Sir Adrian Boult, conductor – Elgar: The Kingdom, Op. 51 (London Philharmonic Choir and Orchestra); Jean Fournet, conductor; Franz Muller, choir director – Faure: Requiem (Netherlands Radio Chorus; Rotterdam Philharmonic); Dom Jean Claire, choir director – Gregorian Chant (Choir of the Monks of Saint-Pierre de Solesmes Abbey); Colin Davis, conductor – Tippett: A Child of Our Time (BBC Choral Society & BBC Symphony Singers; BBC Symphony Orchestra); Claudio Abbado, conductor; Romano Gandolfi, choir director – Verdi: Opera Choruses (Chorus of La Scala-Milan; Orchestra of La Scala-Milan)	
1978	Georg Solti (conductor), Margaret Hillis (choir director)	Verdi: Requiem	Chicago Symphony Orchestra & Chorus	Colin Davis, conductor – Berlioz: L'Enfance du Christ (John Alldis Choir; London Symphony Orchestra); David Willcocks, conductor – Britten: Saint Nicholas (King's College Choir-Cambridge; Academy of St. Martin-In-The-Fields); Herbert von Karajan, conductor – Bruckner: Te Deum (Vienna Singverein Chorus; Berlin Philharmonic Orchestra); Rafael Kubelik, choir director – Dvorak: Stabat Mater (Chorus of Bavarian Radio and Bavarian Radio Symphony); Philip Ledger, choir director – Purcell: Funeral Music for Queen Mary (King's College Choir-Cambridge; Academy of St. Martin-In-The-Fields); Serge Baudo, conductor – Roussel: Psalm 80 for Tenor, Chorus and Orchestra (Stephen Caillat Chorus; Orchestra de Paris)	
1979	Georg Solti (conductor), Margaret Hillis (choir director)	Beethoven: Missa Solemnis	Chicago Symphony Orchestra & Chorus	Neville Marriner, conductor – Bach: Mass in B Minor (Chorus of St. Martin-In-The-Fields; Academy Of St. Martin-In-The-Fields); Maurice Abravanel, conductor – Bloch: Sacred Service (Utah Chorale and Symphony Orchestra); Leonard Bernstein, conductor; Joseph Flummerfelt, choral director – Haydn: Mass No. 9 in D Minor (Lord Nelson Mass) (Westminster Choir; New York Philharmonic); Leonard Slatkin, conductor; Thomas Peck, choral director – Prokofiev: Alexander Nevsky (St. Louis Symphony Chorus and Orchestra); Leonard Bernstein, conductor – Stravinsky: Les Noces and Mass (English Bach Festival Chorus & Trinity Boy's Choir; English Bach Festival Orchestra); Riccardo Muti, conductor; Norbert Balatsch, choral director – Vivaldi: Gloria in D Major and Magnificat (New Philharmonia Chorus; New Philharmonia Orchestra); Georg Solti, conductor; John Alldis, choir director – Walton: Belshazzar's Feast (London Philharmonic Choir; London Philharmonic)	
1980	Georg Solti (conductor), Margaret Hillis (choir director)	Brahms: A German Requiem	Chicago Symphony Orchestra & Chorus	Leonard Bernstein, conductor – Beethoven: Missa Solemnis (N.O.S. Hilverson Radio Chorus; Concertgebouworkest of N.O.S. Hilversum); Daniel Barenboim, conductor – Berlioz: La Damnation de Faust (Chorus of Orchestra De Paris; Orchestra de Paris); Lorin Maazel, conductor; Robert Page, choir director – Berlioz: Requiem (Cleveland Orchestra and Chorus); Andre Previn, conductor; Richard Hickox, chorus master – Britten: Spring Symphony (London Symphony Chorus & St. Clement Danes School Boy's Choir; London Symphony Orchestra); Maurice Abravanel, conductor; Newell B. Wright, choral director – Stravinsky: Symphony of Psalms (Utah Chorale; Utah Symphony Orchestra); John Oliver, conductor – American Music for Chorus (Tanglewood Festival Chorus); Jerzy Semkow, conductor; Thomas Peck, choral director – Beethoven: Choral Fantasy; Elegiac Song; Calm Sea and Prosperous Voyage (St. Louis Symphony Chorus and Orchestra)	
1981	Carlo Maria Giulini (conductor), Norbert Balatsch (chorus master)	Mozart: Requiem	Philharmonia Orchestra & Chorus	Robert Shaw, conductor – Boito: Prologue to Mefistofele (Atlanta Symphony Chorus and Orchestra); Thomas Hilbish, conductor – Menotti: The Unicorn, the Gorgon and the Manticore (University of Michigan Chamber Choir and Chamber Ensemble); Claudio Abbado, conductor – Prokofiev: Alexander Nevsky (London Symphony Chorus and Orchestra); Seiji Ozawa, conductor; John Oliver, choir director – Schoenberg: Gurrelieder (Tanglewood Festival Chorus; Boston Symphony Orchestra)	
1982	Neville Marriner (conductor)	Haydn: The Creation	Academy of St Martin in the Fields & Chorus	Robert Shaw, conductor – Orff: Carmina Burana (Atlanta Boy Choir & Atlanta Symphony Chorus and Orchestra); Eduardo Mata, conductor; Richard Cooke, chorus conductor – Orff: Carmina Burana (London Symphony Chorus; London Symphony Orchestra); Leonard Slatkin, conductor; Thomas Peck, chorus director – Prokofiev: Ivan the Terrible from Music from the Films (St. Louis Symphony Chorus; St. Louis Symphony Orchestra); Zubin Mehta, conductor; Richard Westenburg, choral conductor – Verdi: Requiem (Musica Sacra Chorus; New York Philharmonic)	
1983	Georg Solti (conductor), Margaret Hillis (choir director)	Berlioz: La Damnation de Faust	Chicago Symphony Orchestra & Chorus	Bernard Haitink, conductor; Norbert Balatsch, chorus master – Brahms: German Requiem (Vienna State Opera Chorus; Vienna Philharmonic Orchestra); Neville Marriner, conductor; Laszlo Heltay, chorus master – Haydn: The Seasons (Academy of St. Martin-In-The-Fields Chorus; Academy of St. Martin-In-The-Fields); Simon Rattle, conductor; Nicholas Cleobury, chorus master – Janacek: Glagolitic Mass (City of Birmingham Symphony Chorus and Orchestra); Robert Shaw, conductor – Poulenc: Gloria for Soprano, Choir and Orchestra (G Major) (Atlanta Symphony Chorus and Orchestra); Leonard Slatkin, conductor; Thomas Peck, chorus master – Rachmaninov: The Bells and Russian Songs (St. Louis Symphony Chorus; St. Louis Symphony Orchestra); Nikolaus Harnoncourt, conductor; Gerhard Schmidt-Gaden, choral conductor – Bach: Cantatas, Vol. 30 (Nos. 120-123) (Tölzer Knabenchor; the Concentus Musicus Wien)	
1984	Georg Solti (conductor), Margaret Hillis (choir director)	Haydn: The Creation	Chicago Symphony Orchestra & Chorus	Raymond Leppard, conductor – Bach: St. Matthew Passion (Knabenchor Hannover & NDR Choir; NDR Symphony Orchestra); Trevor Pinnock, conductor – Handel: Coronation Anthems (Choir of Westminster Abbey and English Concert); Herbert von Karajan, conductor – Haydn: The Creation (Vienna Singverein and Vienna Philharmonic); Gunter Jena, conductor – The Brahms Edition: Choral Works a Capella (Complete) (North German Radio Chorus - Hamburg)	
1985	James Levine (conductor), Margaret Hillis (choir director)	Brahms: A German Requiem	Chicago Symphony Orchestra & Chorus	Simon Rattle, conductor – Britten: War Requiem (Boys Of Christ Church Cathedral; City of Birmingham Symphony Chorus and Orchestra); Christopher Hogwood, conductor – Mozart: Requiem (Chorus of the Academy Of Ancient Music & Westminster Cathedral Boys Choir; Orchestra of the Academy of Ancient Music); Riccardo Chailly, conductor – Orff: Carmina Burana (RSO Berlin Chorus; RSO Berlin Orchestra); Riccardo Chailly, conductor – Prokofiev: Alexander Nevsky, Op. 78 (Cleveland Orchestra Chorus and Orchestra)	
1986	Robert Shaw (conductor)	Berlioz: Requiem	Atlanta Symphony Orchestra & Chorus	Ton Koopman, conductor – Handel: Messiah (Choeur "The Sixteen"; Amsterdam Baroque Chorus); Lorin Maazel, conductor – Lloyd Webber: Requiem (Winchester Cathedral Choir; English Chamber Orchestra); Daniel Barenboim, conductor – Mozart: Requiem (Choeurs De Paris; Orchestre De Paris); Herbert von Karajan, conductor – Verdi: Requiem (Chor Der National Opera; Vienna Philharmonic)	
1987	James Levine (conductor), Margaret Hillis (choir director)	Orff: Carmina Burana	Chicago Symphony Orchestra & Chorus	John Eliot Gardiner, conductor – Bach: Mass in B Minor (Monteverdi Choir and English Baroque Soloists); Herbert von Karajan, conductor; Heimuth Froschauer, chorus master – Beethoven: Missa Solemnis (Vienna Singverein; Wiener Philharmoniker); Riccardo Muti, conductor; Joseph Flummerfelt, choral director – Berlioz: Romeo et Juliette (Westminster Choir and Philadelphia Orchestra); Robert Shaw, conductor – Choral Masterpieces (Atlanta Symphony Chorus and Orchestra)	
1988	Robert Shaw (conductor)	Hindemith: When Lilacs Last in the Dooryard Bloom'd	Atlanta Symphony Orchestra & Chorus	Laszlo Heltay, chorus master – Tippett: A Child Of Our Time (Brighton Festival Chorus; Royal Philharmonic Orchestra); Neville Creed, chorus master – Mahler: Symphony No. 8 In E Flat (Symphony of a Thousand) (London Philharmonic Chorus & Tiffin School Boys Choir; London Philharmonic Orchestra); Lubomir Matl, chorus master – Janácek: Glagolitic Mass (Prague Philharmonic Chorus; Czech Philharmonic); Michael Tilson Thomas, conductor; Jerold D. Ottley, chorus master – Copland: Old American Songs: Canticle of Freedom; Four Motets (Mormon Tabernacle Choir; Utah Symphony Orchestra); John Eliot , chorus master – Bach: St. John Passion (Monteverdi Choir; English Baroque Soloists)	
1989	Robert Shaw (conductor)	Verdi: Requiem & Operatic Choruses	Atlanta Symphony Orchestra & Chorus	John Eliot Gardiner, conductor – Bach: Christmas Oratorio (Monteverdi Choir; English Baroque Soloists); Georg Solti, conductor; Margaret Hillis, choral director – Bach: St. Matthew Passion (Chicago Symphony Orchestra & Chorus); Herbert von Karajan, conductor; Helmuth Froschauer, chorus master – Mozart: Requiem (Vienna Singverein and Vienna Philharmonic); Trevor Pinnock, conductor – Vivaldi: Gloria; Scarlatti: Dixit Dominus (English Concert Choir and English Concert)	
1990	Robert Shaw (conductor)	Britten: War Requiem	Atlanta Symphony Orchestra & Chorus and the Atlanta Boy Choir	Leonard Slatkin, conductor – Elgar: The Kingdom (London Philharmonic Choir and Orchestra); John Eliot Gardiner, conductor – Handel: Jephtha (Monteverdi Choir & English Baroque Soloists); Trevor Pinnock, conductor – Handel: Messiah (English Concert Choir and English Concert); Stephen Darlington, conductor – Vaughan Williams: Choral Music, Oxford Elegy, Flos Campi, etc. (Christ Church Cathedral Choir)	
1991	Robert Shaw (conductor)	Walton: Belshazzar's Feast/Bernstein: Chichester Psalms; Missa Brevis	Atlanta Symphony Orchestra & Chorus	John Eliot Gardiner, conductor – Bach: St. Matthew Passion (London Oratory Choir & Monteverdi Choir; English Baroque Soloists); Nicholas McGegan, conductor – Handel: Susanna (U. C. Berkeley Chamber Choir; Philharmonia Baroque Orchestra); Bernard Haitink, conductor – Vaughan Williams: Symphony No. 1 (Sea Symphony) (London Philharmonic Choir; London Philharmonic); Robert Shaw, conductor – Rachmaninoff: Vespers (Robert Shaw Festival Singers)	
1992	Georg Solti (conductor), Margaret Hillis (choir director)	Bach: Mass in B Minor	Chicago Symphony Orchestra & Chorus	John Eliot Gardiner, conductor – Beethoven: Missa Solemnis (Monteverdi Choir and English Baroque Soloists); Robert Shaw, conductor – Janacek: Glagolitic Mass/Dvorak: Te Deum (Atlanta Symphony Chorus and Orchestra); Krzysztof Penderecki, conductor; Hans-Peter Rauscher, Werner Hagen, chorus masters – Penderecki: Polish Requiem (North German Radio Symphony Orchestra); Krzysztof Penderecki, conductor; Bonistawa Wietrzny, chorus master – Penderecki: St. Luke's Passion (Warsaw National Philharmonic Orchestra Chorus; Warsaw National Philharmonic Orchestra)	
1993	Herbert Blomstedt (conductor), Vance George (choir director)	Orff: Carmina Burana	San Francisco Symphony Orchestra, the San Francisco Boys Chorus & the San Francisco Girls Chorus	Martin Pearlman, conductor – Handel: Messiah (Boston Baroque Chorus and Orchestra); John Eliot Gardiner, conductor – Haydn: The Seasons (Monteverdi Choir and English Baroque Soloists); Michael Tilson Thomas, conductor – Janacek: Glagolitic Mass (London Symphony Chorus and Orchestra); Riccardo Chailly, conductor – Mahler: Das Klagende Lied (Stadtischer Musikverein Dusseldorf and Radio Symphony Orchestra Berlin)	
1994	Pierre Boulez (conductor), Margaret Hillis (choir director)	Bartók: Cantata Profana	Chicago Symphony Orchestra & Chorus	Roger Norrington, conductor – Brahms: German Requiem (London Classical Players and The Schultz Choir of London); Michael Tilson Thomas, conductor – Debussy: Le Martyre De Saint Sebastien (London Symphony Orchestra and Chorus); Leonard Slatkin, conductor – Vaughan Williams: A Sea Symphony (Philharmonia Orchestra and Chorus); Paul McCreesh, conductor – Venetian Vespers (Gabrieli Consort and Players)	
1995	John Eliot Gardiner (choir director)	Berlioz: Messe Solennelle	Monteverdi Choir & the Orchestre Révolutionnaire et Romantique	Nikolai Korniev, choir director – Evening Star - The Rachmaninoff Vespers (St. Petersburg Chamber Choir); Tonu Kaljuste, conductor – Part: Te Deum; Silouans Song (Estonian Philharmonic Chamber Choir; Tallinn Chamber Orchestra); Simon Rattle, conductor; Simon Halsey, choir director – Szymanowski: Stabat Mater, Litany To The Virgin Mary, etc. (City of Birmingham Symphony Chorus and Orchestra); Richard Hickox, conductor; John Scott, choir director; Stephen Westrop, chorus master – Vaughan Williams: Dona Nobis Pacem; Sancta Civitas (Choristers Of St. Paul's Cathedral; London Symphony Orchestra)	
1996	Herbert Blomstedt (conductor), Vance George (choir director)	Brahms: Ein deutsches Requiem	San Francisco Symphony Orchestra & Chorus	Robert Shaw, conductor – Evocation of the Spirit (Robert Shaw Festival Singers); Barbara Thornton, conductor – Hildegard Von Bingen: Canticles of Ecstasy (Sequentia); Yuri Temirkanov, conductor – Prokofiev: Alexander Nevsky (St. Petersburg Philharmonic and Chamber Choir of St. Petersburg); John Eliot Gardiner, conductor – Verdi: Requiem, Quattro Pezzi Sacri (Orchestre Révolutionnaire et Romantique and Monteverdi Choir)	
1997	Andrew Litton (conductor), Neville Creed, David Hill (chorus masters)	Walton: Belshazzar's Feast	Bournemouth Symphony Orchestra & Chorus	Ton Koopman, conductor – Bach: Complete Cantatas, Vol. 1 (The Amsterdam Baroque Orchestra and Choir); John Eliot Gardiner, conductor – Danny Boy -- Songs and Dancing Ballads by Percy Grainger (Monteverdi Orchestra and Chorus); William Christie, conductor – Mozart: Requiem (Les Arts Florissants Orchestra and Chorus); Carlo Maria Giulini, conductor – Schubert: Mass in E Flat (Chorus Des Bayerischen Rundfunks; Orchestra Des Bayerischen Rundfunks)	
1998	Robert Shaw (conductor)	Adams: Harmonium/Rachmaninoff: The Bells	Atlanta Symphony Orchestra & Chorus	Christopher Bell, chorus master – Paray: Mass for the 500th Anniversary of the Death of Joan of Arc (Royal Scottish National Orchestra Chorus and Orchestra); John Eliot Gardiner, conductor – Haydn: The Creation (Monteverdi Choir; English Baroque Soloists); Malcolm Hicks (musician), chorus master – Dyson: The Canterbury Pilgrims; Overture: At the Tabard Inn; In Honour of the City (London Symphony Chorus; London Symphony Orchestra); Balduin Sulzer, chorus master – Bruckner: Messe No. 3 In F Minor; Te Deum (Mozart Chorus of Linz; London Philharmonic)	
1999	Robert Shaw (conductor)	Barber: Prayers of Kierkegaard/Vaughan Williams: Dona Nobis Pacem/Bartók: Cantata Profana	Atlanta Symphony Orchestra & Chorus	Paul Salamunovich, conductor – Lauridsen: Lux Aeterna (Lux Aeterna; Les Chansons Des Roses; Ave Maria, Etc.) (Los Angeles Master Chorale; Los Angeles Master Chorale Sinfonia Orchestra); Martin Pearlman, conductor – Monteverdi: Vespers of 1610 (Antiphon; Psalm 109; Magnificat, Etc.) (Boston Baroque Chorus and Orchestra); Konrad Junghanel, conductor – Schutz: Psalmen Davids (Cantus Colln; Concerto Palatino); Sir Georg Solti, conductor; Tamas Bubno, Kalman Strausz, Gabriella Thesz, chorus masters – Georg Solti - The Last Recording (Bartok: Cantana Profana/Kodaly: Psalmus Hungaricus/Weiner: Serenade) (Budapest Festival Chorus, Children's Chorus of Hungarian Radio and TV, Chorus of Hungarian Radio And TV & Schola Cantorum Budapestiensis; Budapest Festival Orchestra)	
2000	Robert Shafer (conductor), Betty Scott, Joan McFarland (choir directors)	Britten: War Requiem	Maryland Boy Choir, the Shenandoah Conservatory Chorus & The Washington Chorus	Paul McCreesh, conductor – Handel: Solomon (Gabrieli Consort; Gabrieli Players); Franz Welser-Möst, conductor; Michael Glaser, chorus master – Schmidt: Book of the Seven Seals (Bavarian Radio Chorus); John Eliot Gardiner, conductor – Schubert: Mass in A Flat (Monteverdi Choir; Orchestre Révolutionnaire et Romantique); Sir Simon Rattle, conductor; Simon Halsey, Gareth Morrell, choir director – Walton: Belshazzar's Feast (City of Birmingham Symphony Chorus & Cleveland Orchestra Chorus)	
2001	Karen Wilson (producer), Don Harder (engineer), Helmuth Rilling (conductor)	Penderecki: Credo	Oregon Bach Festival Orchestra & Chorus	Michaël Ghljs, chorus master; Philippe Herreweghe, conductor – Bach: St. Matthew Passion (Collegium Vocale Gent; Schola Cantorum Cantate Domino); Martin Pearlman, conductor – Bach: Mass in B Minor (Boston Baroque); John Eliot Gardiner, conductor – Bach: Easter Cantatas BWV 6 & 66 (Monteverdi Choir; English Baroque Soloists); Helmuth Rilling, conductor – Bach: Christmas Oratorio (Gächinger Kantorei; Bach-Collegium Stuttgart)	
2002	Martin Sauer (producer), Michael Brammann (engineer), Nikolaus Harnoncourt (conductor), Norbert Balatsch, Erwin Ortner (chorus masters)	Bach: St Matthew Passion	Arnold Schoenberg Chor, Wiener Sängerknaben & Concentus Musicus Wien	Helmuth Rilling, conductor – Rihm: Deus Passus - Passions-Stücke Nach Lukas (Gächinger Kantorei; Bach-Collegium Stuttgart); Maria Guinand, conductor – Golijov: La Pasión Según San Marcos (Schola Cantorum De Caracas; Orquesta La Pasión); Matthias Brauer, chorus master; Giuseppe Sinopoli, conductor – Dvorák: Stabat Mater (Chor der Sächsischen Staatsoper Dresden; Staatskapelle Dresden); Sir John Eliot Gardiner, conductor – Bach: Christmas Cantatas (English Baroque Soloists & Monteverdi Choir)	
2003	Thomas Moore (producer), Michael J. Bishop (engineer), Robert Spano (conductor), Norman Mackenzie (chorus director)	Vaughan Williams: A Sea Symphony (Sym. No. 1)	Atlanta Symphony Orchestra & Chorus	José Antonio Sainz Alfaro & Bo Wannefors, chorus masters; Claudio Abbado, conductor – Verdi: Messa Da Requiem (Eric Ericson Chamber Chorus, Orfeón Donostiarra & Swedish Radio Choir; Berliner Philharmonic); Donald Runnicles, conductor – Orff: Carmina Burana (Atlanta Symphony Chorus & Gwinnett Young Singers; Atlanta Symphony Orchestra); Valery Gergiev, conductor – Gubaidulina: Johannes-Passion (Cham. Cho., St. Petersburg & Cho. of the Mariinsky Theater; Orch. of the Mariinsky Theater, St. Petersburg); Philippe Herreweghe, conductor – Bach: St. John Passion (Chorus du Collegium Vocale Gent; Orchestre du Collegium Vocale Gent)	
2004	Paavo Järvi (conductor), Tiia-Ester Loitme & Ants Soots (chorus masters)	Sibelius: Cantatas	Ellerhein Girls' Choir, Estonian National Male Choir & Estonian National Symphony Orchestra	Laurence Equilbey, conductor – Transcriptions (Bach/Barber/Mahler, Etc.) (Choeur de Chambre Accentus); Edward Higginbottom, conductor – Pergolesi: Marian Vespers (Sophie Daneman; Choir of New College, Oxford; Academy of Ancient Music); Paul Hillier, conductor – Baltic Voices 1 (Estonian Philharmonic Chamber Choir; Tallinn Chamber Orchestra); Dale Warland, conductor – Argento: Walden Pond (The Dale Warland Singers)	
2005	Robert Spano (conductor) & Norman Mackenzie (choir director)	Berlioz: Requiem	Frank Lopardo & the Atlanta Symphony Orchestra & Chorus	Yevhen Savchuk, chorus master; Volodymyr Sirenko, conductor – Silvestrov: Requiem for Larissa (National Choir Of Ukraine "Dumka"; National Symphony Orchestra of Ukraine); Stephen Cleobury, conductor – Rachmaninov: Liturgy of St. John Chrysostom (King's College Choir-Cambridge); Henryk Wojnarowski, chorus master; Antoni Wit, conductor – Penderecki: St. Luke Passion (Adam Kruszewski, Izabella Klosinska & Krzysztof Kolberger; Warsaw Boys Choir & Warsaw National Philharmonic Choir; Warsaw National Philharmonic Orchestra); Paul Hillier, conductor – Baltic Voices 2 (Sisask, Tulev, Schnittke, Etc.) (Estonian Philharmonic Chamber Choir)	
2006	Leonard Slatkin (conductor) & Jerry Blackstone, William Hammer, Jason Harris, Christopher Kiver, Carole Ott & Mary Alice Stollak (choir directors)	Bolcom: Songs Of Innocence And Of Experience: Requiem	Christine Brewer, Measha Brueggergosman, Ilana Davidson, Nmon Ford, Linda Hohenfeld, Joan Morris, Carmen Pelton, Marietta Simpson & Thomas Young; Michigan State University Children's Choir, University Of Michigan Chamber Choir, University Of Michigan Orpheus Singers, University of Michigan University Choir & University Musical Society Choral Union; University of Michigan School of Music Symphony Orchestra	Laurence Equilbey, choir director – Schoenberg: Accentus (Accentus; Ensemble Intercontemporain); Henryk Wojnarowski, chorus master; Antoni Wit, conductor – Penderecki: A Polish Requiem (Izabela Klosinska, Ryszard Minkiewicz, Piotr Nowacki & Jadwiga Rappé; Warsaw National Philharmonic Choir; Warsaw National Philharmonic Orchestra); Stephen Layton, conductor – Lauridsen: Lux Aeterna (Polyphony; Britten Sinfonia); Richard Grant & Lynne Morrow, chorus masters; Kent Nagano, conductor – Bernstein: Mass (Julian Frischling & Jerry Hadley; Rundfunkchor Berlin, Soloists Of The Pacific Mozart Ensemble & Staats-Und Domchor Berlin; Deutsches Symphonie-Orchester Berlin)	
2007	Paul Hillier (conductor)	Pärt: Da Pacem	Estonian Philharmonic Chamber Choir	Stephen Layton, conductor – Whitacre: Cloudburst and Other Choral Works (Thomas Guthrie, Elin Manahan Thomas & Simon Wall; Polyphony); Craig Hella Johnson, conductor – Requiem (Conspirare); Paul McCreesh, conductor – Mozart: Great Mass in C Minor (Sarah Connolly, Neal Davies, Timothy Robinson & Camilla Tilling; Gabrieli Consort; Gabrieli Consort & Players); Øystein Fevang, conductor – Immortal Nystedt (Bærum Vokalensemble & Ensemble 96)	
2008	Simon Rattle (conductor); Simon Halsey (chorus master)	Brahms: Ein Deutsches Requiem	Rundfunkchor Berlin; Berliner Philharmoniker	Michael Gielen, conductor – Schönberg: Gurrelieder (Melanie Diener, Ralf Lukas, Yvonne Naef, Andreas Schmidt, Gerhard Siegel & Robert Smith; Chor Des Bayerischen Rundfunks & MDR Rundfunkchor Leipzig; SWR Sinfonieorchester Baden-Baden und Freiburg); Henryk Wojnarowski, chorus master; Antoni Wit, conductor – Penderecki: Symphony No. 7 'Seven Gates of Jerusalem' (Boris Carmeli, Ewa Marciniec, Aga Mikolaj, Wieslaw Ochman, Olga Pasichnyk & Romuald Tesarowicz; Warsaw National Philharmonic Choir; Warsaw National Philharmonic Orchestra); Charles Bruffy, conductor – Grechaninov: Passion Week (Kansas City Chorale & Phoenix Bach Choir); Peter Dijkstra, chorus master; Riccardo Muti, conductor – Cherubini: Missa Solemnis In E (Ildar Abdrazakov, Herbert Lippert, Marianna Pizzolato & Ruth Ziesak; Chor Des Bayerischen Rundfunks; Symphonieorchester Des Bayerischen Rundfunks)	
2009	Simon Rattle (conductor); Simon Halsey (chorus master)	Stravinsky: Symphony of Psalms	Rundfunkchor Berlin; Berliner Philharmoniker	Joseph Cullen, chorus master; Colin Davis, conductor – Tippett: A Child of Our Time (Steve Davislim, Mihoko Fujimura, Matthew Rose & Indra Thomas; London Symphony Chorus; London Symphony Orchestra); Henryk Wojnarowski, chorus master; Antoni Wit, conductor – Szymanowski, Karol: Stabat Mater (Ewa Marciniec, Iwona Hossa & Jaroslaw Brek; Warsaw Philharmonic Choir; Warsaw Philharmonic Orchestra); Charles Bruffy, conductor – Rheinberger: Sacred Choral Works (Kansas City Chorale & Phoenix Bach Choir); Craig Hella Johnson, conductor – O'Regan, Tarik: Threshold of Night (Company of Voices & Conspirare; Company of Strings)	
2010	Michael Tilson Thomas (conductor); Ragnar Bohlin, Kevin Fox & Susan McMane (choir directors); Peter Laenger & Andreas Neubronner, engineers/mixers	Mahler: Symphony No. 8	San Francisco Symphony Chorus, Pacific Boychoir & San Francisco Girls Chorus; Laura Claycomb, Anthony Dean Griffey, Elza van den Heever, Katarina Karnéus, Quinn Kelsey, James Morris, Yvonne Naef & Erin Wall; San Francisco Symphony	Paul McCreesh, conductor – A Spotless Rose (The Gabrieli Consort); Dennis Keene, conductor – Song of the Stars: Granados, Casals & Blancafort (Erica Kiesewetter, Mark Kruczek & Douglas Riva; Voices of Ascension); Antoni Wit, conductor – Penderecki: Utrenja (Gennady Bezzubenkov, Iwona Hossa, Piotr Kusiewicz, Piotr Nowacki & Agnieszka Rehlis; Warsaw Boys' Choir & Warsaw Philharmonic Choir; Warsaw Philharmonic Orchestra); Harry Christophers, conductor – Handel: Coronation Anthems (Alastair Ross; The Sixteen; The Sixteen Orchestra)	
2011	Riccardo Muti, conductor; Duain Wolfe, chorus master	Verdi: Requiem	Chicago Symphony Orchestra & Chorus	Daniel Reuss, conductor – Martin: Golgotha (Adrian Thompson, Judith Gauthier, Konstantin Wolff, Marianne Beate Kielland & Mattijs Van De Woerd; Cappella Amsterdam & Estonian Philharmonic Chamber Choir; Estonian National Symphony Orchestra); René Jacobs, conductor – Haydn: The Creation (Johannes Weisser, Julia Kleiter & Maximilian Schmitt; RIAS Kammerchor; Freiburger Barockorchester); Paul Hillier, conductor – Baltic Runes (Estonian Philharmonic Chamber Choir); Erwin Ortner, chorus master; Nikolaus Harnoncourt, conductor – Bach: Cantatas (Anton Scharinger, Christian Gerhaher, Bernarda Fink, Gerald Finley, Julia Kleiter, Kurt Streit, Christine Schäfer & Werner Güra; Arnold Schoenberg Chor; Concentus Musicus Wien)	
2012	Eric Whitacre (conductor)	Light & Gold	Christopher Glynn & Hila Plitmann; The King's Singers, Laudibus, Pavao Quartet & The Eric Whitacre Singers	Stephen Layton (conductor) – Beyond All Mortal Dreams - American A Cappella (Choir of Trinity College, Cambridge); Patrick Dupré Quigley (conductor); James K. Bass (chorus master) – Brahms: Ein Deutsche Requiem, op. 45 (Justin Blackwell, Scott Allen Jarrett, Paul Max Tipton & Teresa Wakim; the Professional Choral Institute & Seraphic Fire); Kjetl Almenning (conductor) – Kind (Nidaros String Quartet; Ensemble 96); Paul Hillier (conductor) – The Natural World of Pelle Gudmundsen-Holmgreen (Ars Nova Copenhagen)	
2013	Charles Bruffy (conductor); Blanton Alspaugh, producer; Tom Caulfield & John Newton, engineers/mixers	Life & Breath - Choral Works by René Clausen	Matthew Gladden, Lindsey Lang, Rebecca Lloyd, Sarah Tannehill & Pamela Williamson and the Kansas City Chorale	Julian Wachner (conductor) – Handel: Israel in Egypt (Trinity Baroque Orchestra and the Trinity Choir Wall Street); Peter Eötvös (conductor) – Ligeti: Requiem; Apparitions; San Francisco Polyphony (Barbara Hannigan & Susan Parry, the WDR Sinfonieorchester Köln, SWR Vokalensemble Stuttgart and WDR Rundfunkchor Köln); Stephen Layton (conductor) – Prauliņš: The Nightingale (Michala Petri and the Danish National Vocal Ensemble); Hervé Niquet (conductor) – Striggio: Mass for 40 and 60 Voices (Le Concert Spirituel)	
2014	Tõnu Kaljuste (conductor); Manfred Eicher, producer; Peter Laenger & Stephan Schellmann, engineers	Pärt: Adam's Lament	Tui Hirv & Rainer Vilu; Estonian Philharmonic Chamber Choir; Sinfonietta Riga & Tallinn Chamber Orchestra; Latvian Radio Choir & Vox Clamantis	Colin Davis (conductor) – Berlioz: Grande Messe de Morts (Barry Banks, London Symphony Orchestra, London Philharmonic Choir and London Symphony Chorus); Harry Christophers (conductor) – Palestrina: Volume 3 (The Sixteen); Neeme Järvi (conductor), Adrian Partington (chorus master) – Parry: Works for Chorus & Orchestra (Amanda Roocroft, BBC National Orchestra of Wales and BBC National Chorus of Wales); James Jordan (conductor) (conductor) – Whitbourn: Annelies (Arianna Zukerman, The Lincoln Trio and the Westminster Williamson Voices)	
2015	Craig Hella Johnson (conductor); Robina G. Young (producer); Brad Michel (engineer/mixer)	The Sacred Spirit of Russia	Conspirare	René Jacobs (conductor) – Bach: Matthäus-Passion (Werner Güra & Johannes Weisser (soloists); Akademie für Alte Musik Berlin (orchestra); RIAS Kammerchor & Staats- und Domchor Berlin (choirs)); Vivianne Sydness (conductor) – Dyrud: Out of Darkness (Erland Aagaard Nilsen & Geir Morten Oien (soloists); Sarah Head & Lars Sitter; Nidaros Cathedral Choir); Andrew Davis (conductor) and Stephen Jackson (chorus master) – Holst: First Choral Symphony; The Mystic Trumpeter (Susan Gritton (soloist); BBC Symphony Orchestra and BBC Symphony Chorus); John Butt (conductor) – Mozart: Requiem (Matthew Brook, Rowan Hellier, Thomas Hobbs & Joanne Lunn (soloists); Dunedin Consort (choir))	
2016	Charles Bruffy (conductor); Blanton Alspaugh (producer); Byeong Joon Hwang & John Newton (engineers)	Rachmaninoff: All-Night Vigil	Paul Davidson, Frank Fleschner, Toby Vaughn Kidd, Bryan Pinkall, Julia Scozzafava, Bryan Taylor & Joseph Warner (soloists); Kansas City Chorale & Phoenix Chorale (choruses)	Bernard Haitink (conductor), Peter Dijkstra (chorus master) – Beethoven: Missa Solemnis (Anton Barachovsky, Genia Kühmeier, Elisabeth Kulman, Hanno Müller-Brachmann & Mark Padmore (soloists); Symphonieorchester des Bayerischen Rundfunks (orchestra); Chor des Bayerischen Rundfunks (chorus)); Harry Christophers (conductor) – Monteverdi: Vespers of 1610 (Jeremy Budd, Grace Davidson, Ben Davies, Mark Dobell, Eamonn Dougan & Charlotte Mobbs (soloists); The Sixteen (chorus)); Craig Hella Johnson (conductor) – Pablo Neruda - The Poet Sings (James K. Bass, Laura Mercado-Wright, Eric Neuville & Lauren Snouffer (soloists); Faith DeBow & Stephen Redfield; Conspirare (chorus)); Eric Holtan (conductor) – Paulus: Far in the Heavens (Sara Fraker, Matthew Goinz, Thea Lobo, Owen McIntosh, Kathryn Mueller & Christine Vivona (soloists); True Concord Orchestra (orchestra); True Concord Voices (chorus))	
2017	Krzysztof Penderecki (conductor); Henryk Wojnarowski (choir director)	Penderecki Conducts Penderecki, Volume 1	Nikolay Didenko, Agnieszka Rehlis & Johanna Rusanen (soloists); Warsaw Philharmonic Choir (chorus); Warsaw Philharmonic Orchestra (orchestra)	Elisabeth Holte (conductor) – Himmelrand (Marianne Reidarsdatter Eriksen, Ragnfried Lie & Matilda Sterby (soloists); Inger-Lise Ulsrud (accompanist); Uranienborg Vokalensemble (choir)); Edward Gardner (conductor); Hakon Matti Skrede (chorus master) – Janácek: Glagolitic Mass (Susan Bickley, Gábor Bretz, Sara Jakubiak & Stuart Skelton (soloists); Thomas Trotter (accompanist); Bergen Philharmonic Orchestra (orchestra); Bergen Cathedral Choir, Bergen Philharmonic Choir, Choir of Collegium Musicum, Evard Grieg Kor (choirs)); Donald Nally (conductor) – Lloyd: Bonhoeffer (Malavika Godbole, John Grecia, Rebecca Harris & Thomas Mesa (soloists); The Crossing (ensemble)); Steven Fox (conductor) – Steinberg: Passion Week (The Clarion Choir)	
2018	Donald Nally (conductor); Andreas K. Meyer & Paul Vazquez (engineers)	Bryars: The Fifth Century	The Crossing, PRISM Quartet	Andrew Davis (conductor), Noel Edison (chorus master) – Händel: Messiah (Elizabeth DeShong, John Relyea, Andrew Staples & Erin Wall, soloists; Toronto Mendelssohn Choir and Toronto Symphony Orchestra); Alexander Liebreich (conductor); Florian Helgath (chorus master) – Mansurian: Requiem (Anja Petersen & Andrew Redmond, soloists; Münchener Kammerorchester, RIAS Kammerchor); Nigel Short (conductor) – Music of the Spheres (Tenebrae); Brian A. Schmidt (conductor) – Tyberg: Masses (Christopher Jacobson, soloist; South Dakota Chorale)	
2019	Donald Nally (conductor); Paul Vazquez (producer)	McLoskey: Zealot Canticles	The Crossing	Vladimir Gorbik (conductor) – Chesnokov: Teach Me Thy Statutes (Mikhail Davydov & Vladimir Krasov, soloists; PaTRAM Institute Male Choir); Steven Fox (conductor) – Kastalsky: Memory Eternal (The Clarion Choir); Mariss Jansons (conductor), Peter Dijkstra (chorus master) – Rachmaninov: The Bells (Oleg Dolgov, Alexey Markov & Tatiana Pavlovskaya; Symphonieorchester des Bayerischen Rundfunks; Chor Des Bayerischen Rundfunks); Matthew Guard (conductor) – Seven Words From The Cross (Skylark)	
2020	Robert Simpson (conductor); Blanton Alspaugh (producer); John Newton (engineer)	Duruflé: Complete Choral Works	Ken Cowan (soloist); Houston Chamber Choir	Donald Nally, conductor – Boyle: Voyages (The Crossing); Craig Hella Johnson, conductor – The Hope of Loving (Conspirare); Peter Jermihov, conductor – Sander: The Divine Liturgy of St. John Chrysostom (Evan Bravos, Vadim Gan, Kevin Keys, Glenn Miller & Daniel Shirley (soloists); PaTRAM Institute Singers); Donald Nally, conductor – Smith, K.: The Arc in the Sky (The Crossing)	
2021	JoAnn Falletta (conductor); James K. Bass & Adam Luebke (chorus masters); Bernd Gottinger (engineer/mixer)	Danielpour: The Passion of Yeshua	James K. Bass, J'Nai Bridges, Timothy Fallon, Kenneth Overton, Hila Plitmann & Matthew Worth (soloists); Buffalo Philharmonic Orchestra; Buffalo Philharmonic Chorus & UCLA Chamber Singers	Donald Nally, conductor – Carthage (The Crossing); Leonard Slatkin, conductor; Charles Bruffy, Steven Fox & Benedict Sheehan, chorus masters – Kastalsky: Requiem (Joseph Charles Beutel & Anna Dennis (soloists); Orchestra of St. Luke's; Cathedral Choral Society, The Clarion Choir, Kansas City Chorale & The Saint Tikhon Choir (choruses/orchestras)); Kent Tritle (conductor) – Moravec: Sanctuary Road (Joshua Blue, Raehann Bryce-Davis, Dashon Burton, Malcolm J. Merriweather & Laquita Mitchell (soloists); Oratorio Society of New York Orchestra; Oratorio Society Of New York Chorus (choruses)); Matthew Guard (conductor) – Once Upon a Time (Sarah Walker (soloist); Skylark Vocal Ensemble)	
2022	Gustavo Dudamel (conductor); Grant Gershon, Robert Istad, Fernando Malvar-Ruiz & Luke McEndarfer (chorus masters)	Mahler: Symphony No. 8 (Symphony of a Thousand)	Leah Crocetto, Mihoko Fujimura, Ryan McKinny, Erin Morley, Tamara Mumford, Simon O'Neill, Morris Robinson & Tamara Wilson (soloists); Los Angeles Philharmonic; Los Angeles Children's Chorus, Los Angeles Master Chorale, National Children's Chorus & Pacific Chorale (ensembles)	Matthew Guard (conductor); Jonas Budris, Carrie Cheron, Fiona Gillespie, Nathan Hodgson, Helen Karloski, Enrico Lagasca, Megan Roth, Alissa Ruth Suver & Dana Whiteside (soloists); Skylark Vocal Ensem – It's A Long Way; Donald Nally (conductor); The Crossing (ensemble) – Rising (With The Crossing); Kaspars Putniņš, conductor; Heli Jürgenson, chorus master (Estonian Philharmonic Chamber Choir) – Schnittke: Choir Concerto; Three Sacred Hymns; Pärt: Seven Magnificat Antiphons; Benedict Sheehan (conductor), Michael Hawes, Timothy Parsons & Jason Thoms (soloists); The Saint Tikhon Choir (ensemble) – Sheehan: Liturgy of Saint John Chrysostom; Craig Hella Johnson (conductor); Estelí Gomez (soloist); Austin Guitar Quartet, Douglas Harvey, Los Angeles Guitar Quartet & Texas Guitar Quartet; Conspirare (ensembles) – The Singing Guitar	
2023	Donald Nally (conductor)	Born	Dominic German, Maren Montalbano, Rebecca Myers & James Reese (soloists); The Crossing (ensemble)	John Eliot Gardiner (conductor); English Baroque Soloists, The Monteverdi Choir (ensembles) - Bach: St. John Passion; Yannick Nézet-Séguin (conductor); Donald Palumbo (chorus master); Michelle DeYoung, Eric Owens, Ailyn Pérez & Matthew Polenzani (soloists); The Metropolitan Opera Orchestra; The Metropolitain Opera Chorus (ensembles) - Verdi: Requiem - The Met Remembers 9/11	
2024	Nils Schweckendiek (conductor)	Saariaho: Reconnaissance	Uusinita Ensemble (ensemble); Helsinki Chamber Choir (ensemble)	Donald Nally (conductor); The Crossing (ensemble) - Carols After a Plague; Craig Hella Johnson (conductor); Miró Quartet (ensemble); Conspirare (ensemble) - The House of Belonging; Esa-Pekka Salonen (conductor); San Francisco Symphony Chorus (ensemble) - Ligeti: Lux Aeterna; Steven Fox (conductor); The Clarion Choir (ensemble) - Rachmaninoff: All Night Vigil	
2025	Donald Nally (conductor)	"Ochre"	The Crossing	Matthew Guard (conductor); Skylark Vocal Ensemble (ensemble) - Clear Voices in the Dark; Eric Holtan (conductor); True Concord Orchestra (ensemble); True Concord Voices (ensemble) - A Dream So Bright - Choral Music of Jake Runestad; Jeannette Sorrell (conductor); Apollo's Fire (ensemble); Apollo's Singers (ensemble) - Handel: Israel in Egypt; Elaine Kelly (conductor); Meliissa Attebury, Stephen Sands & Benedict Sheehan (chorus masters); Novus NY, Artefact Ensemble, The Choir of Trinity Wall Street, Downtown Voices & Trinity Youth Chorus (ensembles) - Sheehan: Akathist	
2026	Gustavo Dudamel (conductor); Grant Gershon (chorus master)	Ortiz: Yanga	Los Angeles Master Chorale (ensemble)	Craig Hella Johnson (conductor); Conspirare (ensemble) - Advena - Liturgies for a Broken World; Grant Gershon (conductor); Los Angeles Master Chorale (ensemble) - Childs: In the Arms of the Beloved; Donald Nally (conductor); The Crossing (ensemble) - Lang: Poor Hymnal; Steven Fox (conductor); Emily Drennan & Patti Drennan (chorus masters); The Clarion Choir (ensemble) - Requiem of Light	
2027	Winner TBA on 7 February 2027			Donald Nally (conductor); The Crossing (ensemble) - Hearne: Farming; Eric Holtan (conductor); True Concord Orchestra, True Concord Voices & Tucson Girl Chorus (ensembles) - Here I Am; Gustavo Dudamel (conductor); Philharmonia Orchestra, The Bach Choir & the Boy Choristers of Winchester Cathedral (ensembles) - Hopkins: My Fatherland; Craig Hella Johnson (conductor); Conspirare (ensemble) - Talbot: Piedra de Sol (Sunstone); Melissa Attebury (conductor); Novus NY, Triniy Choir & Trinity Youth Chorus (ensembles) - Yee: Trans Requiem	
