= Dann Coakwell =

- Born: Dann Coakwell; December 8, 1976 (age 49); Temple, Texas, US
- Genre: Classical music
- Occupation: Singer
- Years active: 1999–present
- Website: www.danncoakwell.com

Dann Coakwell is an American tenor specializing in sacred oratorio and the Evangelist roles of Johann Sebastian Bach.

== Career and reception ==
He has performed as a soloist with ensembles including Conspirare, the Oregon Bach Festival, and Bach Collegium Japan.

In a review of Bach’s St Matthew Passion with the Dallas Bach Society, Scott Cantrell of The Dallas Morning News praised Coakwell's vocal expression and storytelling as the Evangelist. In November 2023, Seen and Heard International reviewed his performance in Mendelssohn's arrangement of the same work, commending his narrative delivery.

Coakwell has also appeared as a soloist with the Milwaukee Symphony Orchestra, and his performances of Bach's major works have received critical review in regional publications such as The Berkshire Edge.

== Recordings ==
Coakwell was a featured soloist on the Grammy Award-winning album The Sacred Spirit of Russia (2014) with Conspirare, released on Harmonia Mundi. He has also performed as a soloist on the Grammy-nominated album A Company of Voices (2009) with the same ensemble.

His discography further includes Mohammed Fairouz's Zabur (Naxos, 2016), Bruhns: Cantatas and Organ Works, Vol. 1, and the recording of Bach's St Matthew Passion (arranged by Mendelssohn), conducted by Christopher Jackson.

== Education and teaching ==
Coakwell earned a Bachelor of Music degree from the University of Texas at Austin, a Master of Music and Doctor of Musical Arts from Texas Tech University, and an Artist Diploma from the Yale School of Music and Yale Institute of Sacred Music. He has served on the voice faculty at Ithaca College and worked as a voice instructor at Yale University.
