= Raymond Wilding-White =

American composer (1922–2001)

Raymond Wilding-White (also known as Ray Wilding-White); (9 October 1922 – 24 August 2001) was an American composer of contemporary classical music and electronic music, and a photographer/digital artist.

== Biography ==
Wilding-White was born in Caterham, Tandridge, Surrey, England, and spent the first five years of his life in England before moving to Saint-Germain-en-Laye, outside Paris, France, where he had his first formal instruction in music at the Conservatoire Camille Saint-Saëns. In 1932 the family moved to Buenos Aires, Argentina, his mother's family home. By 1940 he had moved to Cambridge, Massachusetts, United States.

=== Family ===
Wilding-White's father, Charles Dunning White was an American diplomat. Raymond Wilding-White had a number of brothers including Henry, Charles, and Alexander. His wife Glennie was also an accomplished musician, composer and playwright, as was his son Charles.

=== Education & Work ===
In 1940, Wilding-White enrolled in the chemical engineering program at the Massachusetts Institute of Technology, but dropped out to assist in the war effort as a civilian. After the war he was accepted at the Juilliard School in New York City, earning his bachelor's degree in piano performance.

Wilding-White earned his master's degree in composition from the New England Conservatory of Music. During this period he also sang in the Chorus pro Musica under Alfred Nash Patterson, and as a countertenor (male alto) in the choir at Church of the Advent in Boston.

While in Boston he worked at the radio station WGBH. He and Nancy Harper won a Peabody Award for their work on The Children's Circle.

Wilding-White left WGBH to pursue his doctorate in composition from Boston University. He was a student of Aaron Copland and Luigi Dallapiccola.

In 1956, Wilding-White married Glennie. By 1962 he had completed his doctorate and was appointed to the Kulas Chair at Case Institute of Technology. He taught in the humanities program and was director of the Case Glee Club as part of his academic duties and was instrumental in promoting contemporary music concerts and multi-media events in Cleveland, Ohio.

In 1967 Case Institute merged with Western Reserve University, and Wilding-White accepted an invitation from DePaul University to design and install an electronic music studio there. Also in 1967, he was awarded the Cleveland Arts Prize in Music.

Wilding-White continued to teach humanities courses at DePaul until retiring in the mid-1980s.

In Chicago he founded the contemporary performing arts ensemble The Loop Group.

Wilding-White created new radio programming at WFMT in Chicago, Illinois. During the Bicentennial year 1976 he recorded the daily series Our American Music. He also recorded a history of music in Chicago, entitled Music Chicago Style, as a complement to the Chicago Historical Society's exhibit, and wrote and presented programming on composers Charles Ives, John Cage, and Arnold Schoenberg.

Wilding-White's creativity was not limited to music and the performing arts, he was also an avid photographer and visual artist, with exhibitions in the gallery of Darkroom Aids, Chicago (1981) and the Brown County Museum (Green Bay, Wisconsin).

Wilding-White composed over 100 works. He was influenced by the work of John Cage. His scores are archived at the Newberry Library in Chicago, and his photographic work will also be kept there.

=== Death ===
Wilding-White died at his home in Kewaunee, Wisconsin, of liver failure at the age of 78 in 2001, leaving a huge body of musical and photographic work. His wife Glennie died thirteen years later, January 31, 2014, at the age of 81.

== Compositions ==
=== Orchestral ===
- Even Now: variations for Baritone and Orchestra
- Even Now: Chamber Orchestra version
- Concerto for Piano and Orchestra
- Concerto for Violin and Orchestra
- Concertante for Horn, Violin and Strings
- Bandmusic for concert Band (LP Recording)
- Haiku for solo voices and various Instrumental Combinations
- Whatzit No 4 for Orchestra
- The Southern Harmony for Orchestra and Amateur Chorus (Materials traditionally and graphically notated; final layout to be chosen by the conductor)
- Symphony for Swing Orchestra
- De Profundis: The 8 Virtues and 7 Vices as seen by Peter Breughel
- Quodlibet for Chorus, Solo Voices and Orchestra. 4 Mov.
- A Symphony of Symphonies
- Symphony No 1 Old Postcards: String Orchestra
- Symphony No 2 Thomas Cole's "The Voyage of Life": Full Orchestra
- Symphony No 3 Boccioni's "States of Mind": Wind and Percussion Orch.

=== Choral ===
- The Psalms

- Psalm 1 Mixed Chorus
- Psalm 2 Three Equal Male Parts
- Psalm 3 SSAA and 3 Trombones
- Psalm 4 SATB
- Psalm 5 (Two Versions)

- Psalm 5 (Monte Carlo Suite No 4): Soprano and Wind Ensemble

- Psalm 6 Female Voices
- Psalm 6 Spoken Ensemble and Drum Set
- Psalm 7 Mixed voices
- Psalm 8 SATB
- Two Psalms for Baritone

- No 16 Solo
- No 126 with piano

- Four Psalms for Tenor and String Quartet

- Psalm 63
- Psalm 70
- Psalm 42
- Psalm 100

- Psalm 9 Mixed Voices
- Psalm 11 SATB and flute
- Psalm 12 (The Magic Square) SAB
- Psalm 13 Soprano and Piano (in 12 Songs)
- Three Psalms for Bariton and Percussion

- Psalm 13
- Psalm 93
- Psalm 43

- Psalm 15 Pop setting SAAA, 2 keyboards, bass (opt drum set)
- Psalm 16 Soprano and Organ
- Psalm 17 SATB
- Psalm 18 Mixed Voices and Orchestra
- Psalm 19 "The 702 Names of God" 6 voices, solo voice, 2 electric pianos
- Psalm 19 "Morse Code"
- Four Psalms for Voices and Brass

- No 12 for (amplified) SSAABB Trumpet. Horn and Trombone
- No 111 for SSAATTBB 3 Trumpets. 3 Trombones & Tuba
- No 113 for SATB 3 Trumpets. 3 Trombones & Tuba
- No 115 for SSAATTBB Trumpet, Horn and Trombone

- Psalm 20 Bass and violin
- Psalm 21 Baritone and cello
- Psalm 22 Amplified S and 3 Trumpets
- Psalm 23 (Two Versions) SSAA
- Psalm 24 Bariton and cello
- Psalm 25 2 voices and 4 cymbal players
- Psalm 26 Soprano solo, oboe, string quartet
- Psalm 27 Soprano solo, 6 clarinets
- Psalm 28 SSS soli
- Psalm 29 SATB
- Psalm 30 Teno, solo horn, bassoon
- Psalm 31 Three Voices and 6 Xylophonists (3 instruments)
- Psalm 32 SB, flute, clarinet, horn, violin, viola, cello
- Psalm 33 Soprano solo, violin, cello, 2 trombones, theremin, percussion
- Psalm 39 "Jeux de Cartes" Score on a deck of cards to be shuffled and dealt.

Variable number of voices and instruments

- Psalm 43 Any number of men in unison and independently; 7 women plus 2 clarinets, 2 percussion & piano
- Psalm 47 Male Chorus
- Psalm 47 jazz vocal quartet setting
- Psalm 51 Soprano solo, English horn, string quartet or organ
- Psalm 54 24 Solo voices
- Psalm 84 Baritone and flute
- Psalm 89 - 6 altos and 6 flutes
- Psalm 95 SSSSAAAATTBB
- Psalm 99 SSAATTBB Organ
- Psalm 102 Soprano, Countertenor and Organ
- Psalm 109 16 Solo Voices
- Psalm 112 Graphic Score
- Psalm 114 Soprano and Piano (in 12 Songs)
- Psalm 134 12 sung voices and 12 spoken voices
- Psalm 141/142 - 4 sopranos, 4 altos, 4 baritones, piano, tam tam, truck spring
- Psalm 142 with Mark Twain's War Prayer

SATB soli, SATB chorus, 4 oboes, 3 trumpets, 3 tbns, Vi 1-2, Vl, Ce, Bass.

- Psalm 149 for SS Violin and viola
- Psalm 150 for SSTB Hammered Dulcimer and Harpsichord

- Advent Choruses (Various short choruses)
- Penitential Mass
- Latin Mass SATB
- Jazz Mass SATB
- Magnificat S Violin and Viola
- Magnificat for Jazz Vocal Group SATB Soli and SATB
- Easter Music for St Agnes A Solo & Harpsichord
- Space Madrigals (Pub Lawson Gould)
- A Book of Madrigals (52 madrigals for various combinations a capella)
- Wedding Motet: SATB
- Bennington Epitaphs SATB
- The Ship of Death: Mezzo-Soprano, SATB and Wind Ensemble
- Three Christmas Carols
- Three Songs by Sir Thomas Wyatt SSAA
- Restoration Lyrics (Texts by the Earl of Rochester) TTBB
- Mexico City Blues (Kerouac): Male Chorus and Jazz Combo
- Laudamus Viros Gloriosos: Male Chorus
- In Memoriam A.N.R SATB
- The Enrolment Management Rag: Mixed Chorus
- Whatzit No 5 for Chorus
- Nursery Birds for Mixed Chorus
- Tang Poems: 20 settings for various combinations of voice and Instruments
- Requiescat (to a poem by Oscar Wilde)
- McGuffey's Eclectic Reader. SATB &

Small chorus SATB (Optionally SSAATTBB soli) and small ensemble

- A Song for Christmas Eve, words by Glennie Wilding-White

=== Songs ===
- Three Housman Poems: S and Piano (Pub Galaxy)
- Six Poems from the Tang Dynasty: S and Flute
- Twelve Songs for Soprano and Piano (1959) (includes 4 William Blake Songs)
- Three Poems by Robert Graves: Bar and Piano
- Novalis songs: Bar and Piano
- Trionfo di Bacco e Arianne: Two Sopranos and Piano
- The Ballad of Psychoanalysis: Contralto and Piano
- Cummings Songs Soprano or Mezzo and Piano
- Cinco Poemas de Gil Vicente: Soprano and Piano
- Eight Songs: Two sopranos and Instrumental Ensemble
- Twenty Dickinson Poems: Soprano and Alto
- Four Poems by St John of the Cross: Mezzo. Two Flutes and Two Trumpets
- Quatre Poemes and Quatre Poemes: Soprano, Flute/Recorder and Piano
- For Mrs Crofts: Soprano and flute
- For Robert Michaud: Baritone and flute
- The Arkansas Traveler: Tenor and Piano
- Death Songs: Soprano and Instrumental Ensemble
- Millay Poems

- a: Nine for Soprano and Piano
- b: Nine for Soprano and guitar

- Three Poems by Sid Corman for Alto. Violin and Viola
- Le Bestiaire ou le Cortege d'Orphee for soprano, flute, cello, harp
- Two Iwi Songs:

- 1. Solo voice and 3 equal voices
- 2. SSATB soli

- Short Mass for Soprano and Organ
- Two German Songs for Soprano and Piano

=== Instrumental ===
- Sonata for Two Pianos
- Piano sonata
- Three organ Preludes
- 14 Chorale Preludes for Organ
- Duos for Violin and Piano
- String Quartet No 1
- String Quartet No 2 (Monte Carlo Suite No l)
- String Quartet No 3 (The Forest) Tenor and String Quartet
- String Quartet No 4
- String Quartet No 5
- String Quartet No 6 (The Song Quartet) Soprano and String Quartet
- String Quartet No 7 (See Psalms)
- Variations for Chamber Organ and String Trio
- Character Sketches for Piano (Pub Galaxy)
- For Mallets (Pub Mus for Perc.)
- Sonatina for Trumpet and Piano
- Counterpoints for Two Clarinets
- Fragments for Jazz Ensemble
- Encores for Stu: Solo Trombone
- Fifty Eight Traditional Variations on a Traditional Theme: Piano Brass duets
- Brass duets
- Whatzit No 1 for Perc and Piano
- Whatzit No 2 for Piano
- Whatzit No 3 for Piano
- Whatzit No 6 for Solo Trombone
- The Rape of Spring (from fragments attributed to Roger Scott)

Harpsichord, Tape and Narration

- Algorhythms for Piano
- Eight Fish Creek Autographs
- Monte Carlo Suite No 3 (*Piano sonata 2)
- Serenata for Brass Quintet
- Whatzit No 12-Short Things for Violin and Piano
- Three Short Rags and The Monotony Rag
- Fanfare for Mark Rothko. Tape and Brass Quintet
- Lines from the Twelve Moons: Narrator. Piano and Four Basses
- Les Fourberies: Suite for Hammered Dulcimer, Guitar and Harpsichord
- Variations on Stabat Mater for Organ
- My Album: Assorted Inventions
- Concerto for Organ and Piano
- Suite for Flute and Marimba
- 14 Romantic Preludes from Old Maritime Postcards for Piano Solo

=== Stage works ===
- The Tub (chamber opera for SATB soli and Piano)
- The Lonesome Valley (ballet)
- The Selfish Giant (opera for TV)
- The Trees (ballet)
- Yerma (opera in 3 acts, 6 scenes.)
- The Music of Eric Zann -- A Gothic Tale after H.P. Lovecraft (tape and violin)
- Liturgy (ballet, brass quintet)
- Trio (ballad opera)
- Gifts (liturgical drama)
- Gifts II (liturgical drama)
- The Ghost of a Flea (puppet show)

== Books ==
- Wilding-White, Raymond (1994). Music Chicago Style. Kewaunee, Wisconsin: Raymond Wilding-White. OCLC: 47815153.
