= London Symphony Chorus =

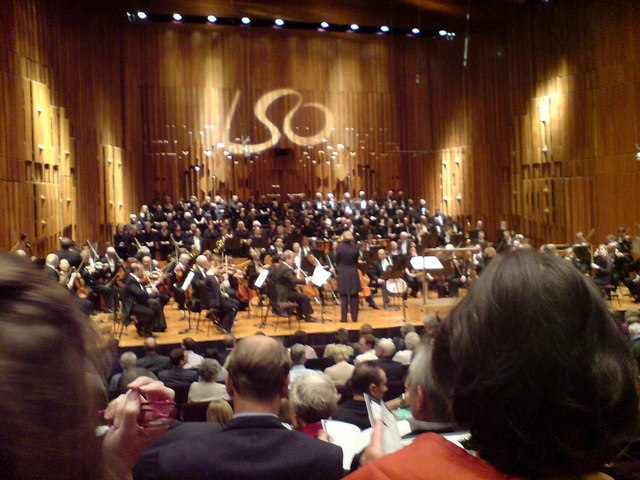
- The LSC and the LSO in the Barbican Concert Hall, 2007

Background information
- Also known as: LSC
- Origin: London, United Kingdom
- Genres: Classical
- Years active: 1966–present
- Labels: CBS, Chandos, Decca, Deutsche Grammophon, EMI, Erato, Hallé, Hyperion, LSO Live, Philips, RCA, Virgin
- Website: lsc.org.uk

Official logo of the London Symphony Chorus

The London Symphony Chorus (abbreviated to LSC) is a large symphonic concert choir based in London, UK, consisting of over 150 amateur singers, and is one of the major symphony choruses of the United Kingdom. It was formed in 1966 as the LSO Chorus to complement the work of the London Symphony Orchestra (LSO). The LSC is today an independent self-run organisation governed by a council of nine elected representatives. It continues to maintain a close association with the LSO but also takes part in projects with other orchestras and organisations both in the UK and abroad. The LSC performs mainly with the LSO at the Barbican Centre in London; it also regularly appears at other concert venues in the UK and Europe, as well as at Lincoln Center in New York.

== Repertoire ==
The Chorus's core repertoire consists of the major nineteenth and twentieth century orchestral choral works. The Chorus has performed and recorded works such as Elgar's The Dream of Gerontius, Mahler's Second, Third and Eighth Symphonies, Ravel's Daphnis et Chloé, Dvořák's Stabat Mater, Janáček's Glagolitic Mass, Britten's War Requiem, Beethoven's Ninth Symphony and Missa Solemnis, Berlioz's La damnation de Faust and Roméo et Juliette, Schoenberg's Gurre-Lieder, Brahms's Ein deutsches Requiem, Rossini's Stabat Mater, Stravinsky's Oedipus Rex & Symphony of Psalms, Tippett's A Child of Our Time and Verdi's Requiem.

The Chorus has also taken part in concert performances and commercial recordings of operas including Beethoven's Fidelio, Berlioz's Les Troyens and Benvenuto Cellini, Bernstein's Candide, Britten's Peter Grimes and Billy Budd, Verdi's Rigoletto, Falstaff and Otello, Wagner's Götterdämmerung and Richard Strauss's Elektra.

== Notable recordings ==
The London Symphony Chorus's discography consists of over 140 recordings, and many of these recordings feature collaborations with the London Symphony Orchestra. Since 2000 the LSC has taken part in productions for the orchestra's new CD label, LSO Live which launched in 2000 and specialises in recordings of live performances in front of audiences. Among works recorded by the choir are Brahms's German Requiem (LSO, André Previn 2000); Mahler's Symphony No. 8 (CBSO, Simon Rattle 2005); Mozart's Requiem (LSO, Sir Colin Davis 2008); Britten: War Requiem (LSO, Giandrea Noseda 2012); Berlioz's Requiem (LSO, Colin Davis, 2013); and Weber's Der Freischütz (LSO, Sir Colin Davis, 2013). Notable solo artists who have featured on LSC releases include Ian Bostridge, Simon Keenleyside, Felicity Palmer and Anne Sofie von Otter.

A number of LSC recordings have received awards including the following:

Year of recording	Work	Orchestra/Conductor	Label	Awards
1989	Bernstein: Candide	LSO, Leonard Bernstein (conductor)	Deutsche Grammophon	Grammy Award Best Classical Album
1991	Britten: War Requiem	LSO, Richard Hickox (conductor)	Chandos Records	Grand Prix du Disque; Gramophone Award Best Choral Recording
1995	Britten: Peter Grimes	LSO, Richard Hickox (conductor)	Chandos Records	Grammy Award Best Opera Recording
2000	Berlioz: Les Troyens	LSO, Colin Davis (conductor)	LSO Live	Grammy Award Best Opera Recording, Best Classical Album
2004	Verdi: Falstaff	LSO, Colin Davis (conductor)	LSO Live	Grammy Award Best Opera Recording
2007	Britten: Billy Budd	LSO, Daniel Harding (conductor)	Virgin Classics	Grammy Award Best Opera Recording
2009	Wagner: Götterdämmerung	Hallé Orchestra, Mark Elder (conductor)	Hallé	Gramophone Award Best Opera Recording

== Conductors ==
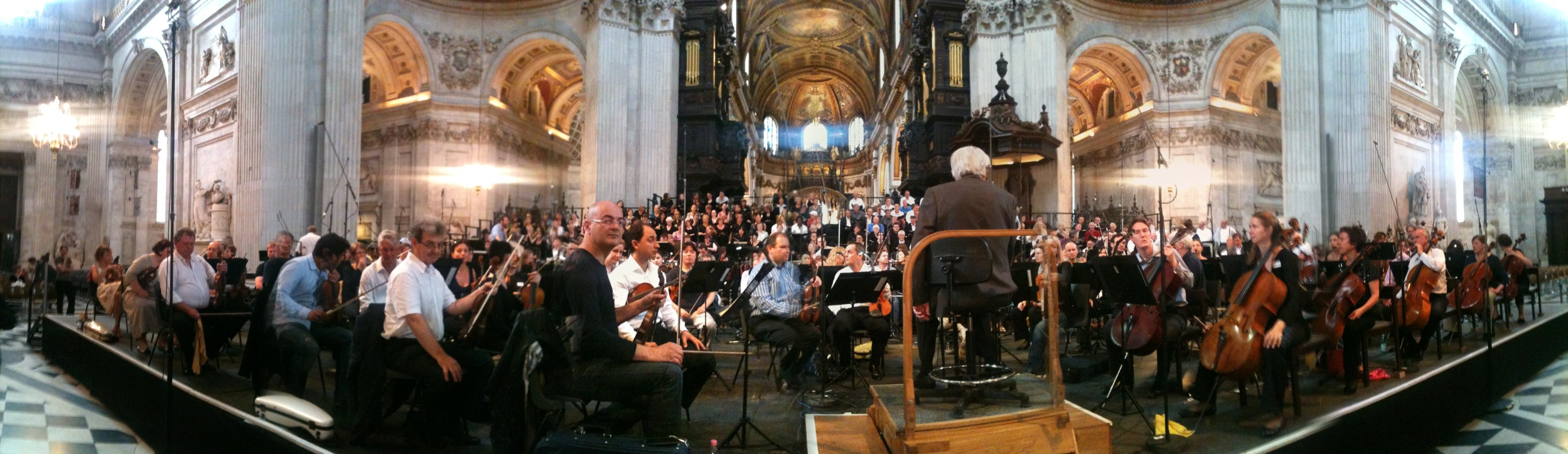
The LSC rehearsing with Sir Colin Davis and the LSO for a 2012 performance of Berlioz Requiem in St Paul's Cathedral

Since its creation the Chorus has worked with a number of major choir trainers including John Alldis, Arthur Oldham, Richard Hickox, Stephen Westrop and Simon Halsey. Since 2023, the LSC Chorus Director is Mariana Rosas.

The London Symphony Chorus has performed with many of the leading conductors of the day including Claudio Abbado, Daniel Barenboim, Leonard Bernstein, Pierre Boulez, Colin Davis, Mark Elder, John Eliot Gardiner, Valery Gergiev, Bernard Haitink, Mariss Jansons, Charles Mackerras, Antonio Pappano, André Previn, Simon Rattle, Mstislav Rostropovich, Georg Solti and Michael Tilson Thomas.

== Patrons ==
=== Past ===
- Diana, Princess of Wales

=== Present ===
- Simon Russell Beale
- Howard Goodall
