= Craig Hella Johnson =

- Born: Craig Morris Johnson; June 15, 1962 (age 64); Crow Wing County, Minnesota, US
- Genres: choral, contemporary music, classical music
- Occupations: composer, conductor, educator, arranger
- Instrument: piano
- Website: www.conspirare.org/who-we-are/craig-hella-johnson/

Craig Hella Johnson (born Craig Morris Johnson; June 15, 1962) is an American choral conductor, composer, and arranger.

== Early life ==
Johnson was born in Brainerd, Minnesota, and raised in Virginia, Minnesota, on the Iron Range. His father was a Lutheran pastor, and music played a central role in both his family and community life. As a child, Johnson began studying piano and later traveled to Duluth for organ lessons beginning in seventh grade. He served as a church organist throughout high school and was actively involved in school music programs and local community performances.

== Education ==
Johnson earned his Bachelor of Music in Piano Performance from St. Olaf College in 1984, where he also sang in the St. Olaf Choir. During his freshman year, a symphonic literature class sparked his passion for conducting. Observing a rehearsal of the Minnesota Orchestra, Johnson described the moment the conductor lifted his arms to begin Glinka’s *Overture to Ruslan and Lyudmila* as transformative.

He pursued graduate studies at the Juilliard School, the University of Illinois at Urbana–Champaign, and Yale University, where he earned a Doctor of Musical Arts degree.

== Career ==
Johnson founded the professional choral ensemble Conspirare in Austin, Texas, and continues to serve as its artistic director. Under his leadership, the group has gained international recognition for its innovative programming and high artistic standards. In 2015, he and Conspirare received the Grammy Award for Best Choral Performance for the album The Sacred Spirit of Russia (Harmonia Mundi, 2014).

From 1998 to 1999, Johnson served as the artistic director of Chanticleer, becoming the second person to hold the position after founder Louis Botto. He was also the long-time artistic director of the Victoria Bach Festival and directed the Houston Masterworks Chorus from 2001 to 2003.

== Academic appointments ==
Johnson was director of choral activities at the University of Texas at Austin for eight years and currently serves as Professor and Resident Artist in Choral Music at Texas State University.

In 2013, he was named the official Texas State Musician by the Texas Commission on the Arts, becoming the second classical musician to receive the honor. That same year, he was appointed music director of the Vocal Arts Ensemble in Cincinnati, Ohio.

== Considering Matthew Shepard ==
In 2016, Johnson premiered Considering Matthew Shepard, a concert-length fusion oratorio honoring the life and legacy of Matthew Shepard, a gay college student murdered in 1998. The work blends a range of musical styles and incorporates texts by Hildegard of Bingen, Lesléa Newman, Michael Dennis Browne, and Rumi, as well as excerpts from Shepard’s journal and interviews with his family.

The piece was featured in a PBS documentary in 2018, and Conspirare’s recording of the oratorio received a Grammy nomination.

== Personal life ==
Johnson lives in Austin, Texas, with his partner, architect Philip Overbaugh.
