= Vigo Collegiate Institute =

Private school in Terre Haute, Indiana

Coordinates: 39°28′08.5″N 87°24′35.0″W

Vigo Collegiate Institute was a private school in Terre Haute, Indiana. It was located on the east side of Sixth Street between Mulberry and Eagle Streets in a building constructed for use as a seminary. The site is now part of Indiana State University's campus. Several of the school's faculty members went on to achieve renown, including one as head of the Library of Congress during the American Civil War.

The Wabash Courier published a faculty role on January 8, 1848, two days before the school was scheduled to open on January 10, 1848. Vigo Collegiate's first principal was E. Thompson Baird. J.B.L. Soule taught at the school and mathematics professor J.G. Stevenson later became Librarian of Congress. The school closed in 1853, and the property was sold for use as an institution of public education.
