= Arthur Oldham =

English composer and choirmaster

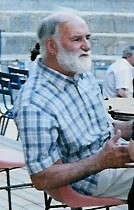
Arthur William Oldham

Arthur William Oldham OBE (6 September 1926 – 4 May 2003) was an English composer and choirmaster. He founded the Edinburgh Festival Chorus in 1965, the Chorus of the Orchestre de Paris in 1975, and the Concertgebouw Orchestra Chorus in Amsterdam in 1979. He also worked with the Scottish Opera Chorus 1966–74 and directed the London Symphony Chorus 1969–76. For his work with the LSO Chorus, he won three Grammy Awards. He was also a composer, mainly of religious works, but also a ballet and an opera.

== Education and early career ==
Arthur Oldham was born in London in 1926. When he was age 14, his mother committed suicide by gassing herself in an oven, and he was brought up in Wallington, at that time in Surrey. He won a scholarship to the Royal College of Music, where he studied composition under Herbert Howells. He then became Benjamin Britten's only private pupil at Aldeburgh between 1945 and 1951. (He claims that the bar lines on the manuscript of Peter Grimes were his work.) He and Britten came into conflict over their ideas about choral music, but they later worked together in Edinburgh on Britten's Voices for Today, Op. 75, and the War Requiem. Until 1968 the only published vocal score of Britten's The Little Sweep was the piano duet and percussion version prepared by Arthur Oldham.

He was appointed musical director of the Ballet Rambert in 1945, aged only 19. His music first came to public notice in 1946, when his ballet Mr Punch was performed by the Ballet Rambert at Sadler's Wells, and was included in the Rambert's 1947–48 tour of Australia and New Zealand. Several of his own pieces were heard at early Aldeburgh Festivals. He also composed for the Royal Ballet for a time.

He arranged Britten's Variations on a Theme of Frank Bridge (a work for string orchestra) for full orchestra, for the ballet Le Rêve de Léonor, choreographed by Frederick Ashton. This had its first performance on 26 April 1949 at the Prince's Theatre, London, by the Ballet de Paris de Roland Petit.

== 1950s ==
In 1952, after Edmund Rubbra pulled out of the project, Oldham provided a variation for Variations on an Elizabethan Theme, a collaborative work with other contributions by Lennox Berkeley, Britten, Imogen Holst, Humphrey Searle, Michael Tippett and William Walton. That year, his modern treatment of Thomas Arne's pastiche opera Love in a Village was staged by the English Opera Group. Criticism of the work led to a nervous breakdown and his working outside music for some time.

He then became a Roman Catholic and was employed as a teacher at Scotus Academy and choirmaster at St Mary's Roman Catholic Cathedral, Edinburgh. He introduced Scottish pre-Reformation music such as Robert Carver's 19-part motet O Bone Jesu. Britten's Missa Brevis had its first performance in Scotland under Oldham's direction in 1959. His work at the cathedral was noticed by people such as Carlo Maria Giulini and Georg Solti.

== 1960s and 70s ==
The first performance in Scotland (and one of the earliest in the United Kingdom) of Mahler's Symphony No. 8 "Symphony of a Thousand" was scheduled for the opening night of the 1965 Edinburgh Festival, with the Scottish National Orchestra, but a suitable choir was lacking. Lord Harewood and Alexander Gibson approached Oldham to create one and train the singers, and the Edinburgh Festival Chorus was born. Under his direction for the next 12 years, the chorus went on to participate in major works such as Verdi's Requiem (under Giulini), Tippett's A Child of Our Time (under Gibson), Bach's Magnificat (under Herbert von Karajan), Prokofiev's Seven, They are Seven (under Gennady Rozhdestvensky], Mahler's "Resurrection" Symphony (under Leonard Bernstein), Brahms's A German Requiem (under Daniel Barenboim), and Stravinsky's Symphony of Psalms (under Claudio Abbado). He was instrumental in the first Scottish performances of Britten's War Requiem, under Alexander Gibson. He also continued with the St Mary's Cathedral Choir until 1971.

Oldham was the recipient of the 1973 St Mungo Prize, awarded to the individual who has done most in the previous three years to improve and promote the city of Glasgow. He also worked with the London Symphony Chorus between 1969 and 1976, winning three Grammy Awards.

Oldham left for Paris in 1976 to create the Orchestre de Paris's Chorus at Daniel Barenboim's request. For his farewell appearance in Edinburgh he wrote Psalms in Time of War, which was performed at the 1977 Edinburgh Festival. His first project with the Paris chorus was Berlioz's Te Deum, under Barenboim, for which he had auditioned 1,700 people to create a chorus of 200 singers.

== Later career and death ==
From 1987 to 1994 he commuted weekly between Paris and Edinburgh, working with both choirs. In 1992, the Edinburgh Chorus presented Schoenberg's Moses und Aron. From 1994, he worked with the Orchestre de Paris Chorus exclusively. He celebrated 20 years with the chorus in 1996 with a new work, The Will of Villon. He retired from that chorus in 2002. A brief autobiography, Living with Voices, was published in 2000.

Arthur Oldham died in Villejuif in 2003, aged 76. Fauré's Requiem was performed in his memory. He was married twice, and left 2 sons and 2 daughters.

The Arthur Oldham/Michael Lester-Cribb Memorial Fund has been created to honour the joint work of Oldham and Michael Lester-Cribb, the Edinburgh Festival Chorus's pianist.

== Grammy Awards ==
Arthur Oldham shared the credit for three Grammy Awards for his work with the London Symphony Chorus:

- 14th Grammy Awards (1972) – Best Choral Performance, Classical
  - Berlioz's Requiem (Colin Davis, conductor; Oldham and Russell Burgess, choir directors)
- 16th Grammy Awards (1974) – Best Choral Performance, Classical (other than opera)
  - Walton's Belshazzar's Feast (André Previn, conductor; Oldham, choirmaster)
- 19th Grammy Awards (1977) – Best Choral Performance (other than opera)
  - Rachmaninoff's The Bells (Previn, conductor; Oldham, choirmaster)

== Works ==
This is an incomplete list of Arthur Oldham's compositions:

- Angels from the Realms of Glory (arrangement)
- Blind Audlay's Carol (commissioned by the Purcell Singers for the Aldeburgh Festival)
- Circus Parade
- Hymn of dedication
- Hymns for the Amusement of Children, for soprano soloist, chorus and organ (or orchestra)
- I sing of a maiden
- Laudes Creaturarum (1961), recorded by the St Mary's Cathedral Choir and the Scottish National Orchestra, and by the London Choral Sinfonia
- The Land of Green Ginger, a musical for children
- Love in a Village, arrangement of Thomas Arne's opera pastiche, staged by the English Opera Group in 1952
- Missa Sancti Thomas More, 4 (SATB) part mass setting
- Mr Punch, ballet (1946)
- Now's the Time for Mirth and Play, unison voice.organ
- Psalms in Time of War choral, premiered at the Edinburgh Festival, 1977
- Remember O thou man, carol (This has been recorded a number of times.)
- Sacerdos et Pontifex for mixed chorus and organ (1963), recorded by the London Choral Sinfonia
- Saint Francis
- Three Chinese Lyrics, song cycle (recorded by Peter Pears and Benjamin Britten)
- Two Hymn Tunes, SATB/organ
- Variations on an Elizabethan Theme (1952), Variation 1, Allegro non troppo
- The Will of Villon (1996), choral
