= Scotus Academy =

Coordinates: 55.944°N 3.265°W

- Corstorphine Road; Edinburgh; Scotland

Information
- School type: Independent all-male primary to secondary school
- Motto: Latin: Decuit, Potuit, Ergo Fecit (It was fitting; He was able; Therefore, he did it)
- Religious affiliation: Roman Catholic (Congregation of Christian Brothers)
- Established: 1953
- Closed: 1978
- Rector: Br. T. Livingstone, CFC (1978)
- Language: English

Scotus Academy was a Catholic all-boys day school in Edinburgh. It was founded in 1953 by the Congregation of Christian Brothers and closed in 1978. The building now forms part of Murrayfield Hospital.

== Rectors ==
1. Br. J. Solano Russell, CFC (1953 – February 1959)
2. Br. Patrick Kostka Ennis, CFC (April 1959 – 1962)
3. Br. Ignatius Baylor, CFC (1962 – February 1966)
4. Br. J. C. Ambrose, CFC (April 1966 – 1971)
5. Br. T. Livingstone, CFC (1971 – 1978)

== Notable faculty ==
Arthur Oldham, an English composer, was amongst its faculty.
