= Broadway Presbyterian Church =

Historic church building in Baltimore, Maryland

Coordinates: 39°17′14.8″N 76°35′38.2″W

Har Sinai Church of Christ is located in a historic church building that was originally Broadway Presbyterian Church and then Grace English Evangelical Lutheran Church (for more than 75 years) in Baltimore, Maryland. It was built as a Presbyterian on the southwest corner of Gough Street and Broadway in Fell's Point.

== Broadway Presbyterian Church ==
The cornerstone of Broadway Presbyterian Church was laid in a ceremony August 13, 1843. Ebenezer Thompson Baird was one of those in attendance. The church opened in January 1846 with Rev. John C. Backus presiding. Thomas E. Peck was installed as the first pastor. He later served as pastor of another church and became a professor at Hampden Sydney College in Virginia.

== Grace English Lutheran ==
In 1887 the church was purchased and became Grace English Evangelical Lutheran Church. In the mid-1960s much of the congregation had moved to the suburbs.

== Contemporary times ==
The brick church building appears to remain standing. A Broadway Presbyterian Church is active in another location. The church building is now identified as St. Augustine English Lutheran Church Baltimore and Har Sinai Church of Christ, a Pentecostal church.
