= Ebenezer Thompson Baird =

Reverend Ebenezer Thompson Baird (1821–1887) was an influential Presbyterian minister, fundraiser, founder of schools, and missionary. He studied law, worked at various schools, and was an editor for a Presbyterian newspaper.

Baird was the son of notable minister Thomas D. Baird. He had four brothers and one sister. Ebenezer Baird served as the Secretary of the Committees of Education and Publication in the Presbyterian church.

Baird helped lay the cornerstone of the Broadway Presbyterian Church in Baltimore, Maryland on August 13, 1844. He was a teacher at a private school in Baltimore the early 1840s.

Baird helped raise money to start a seminary in Terre Haute, Indiana. The building was used for a private school and Baird was the first principal of Vigo Collegiate Institute. After it opened he became the school's librarian.

From 1850 to 1852, Baird was the president of Washington College in Limestone, Tennessee. While he was editor of "The St. Louis Presbyterian” from September 1852 to October 1854, Baird’s typesetter was Samuel Clemens, more commonly known as Mark Twain.

Baird married Anna Susan McDannold in St. Louis on December 6, 1860. They had two sons and five daughters.

Baird published a book of hymns in Virginia.

Late in his life he was principal of Montgomery Female College in Christiansburg, Virginia.

He was awarded honorary degrees.
