= Simon Halsey =

English choral conductor (born 1958)

Simon Halsey CBE
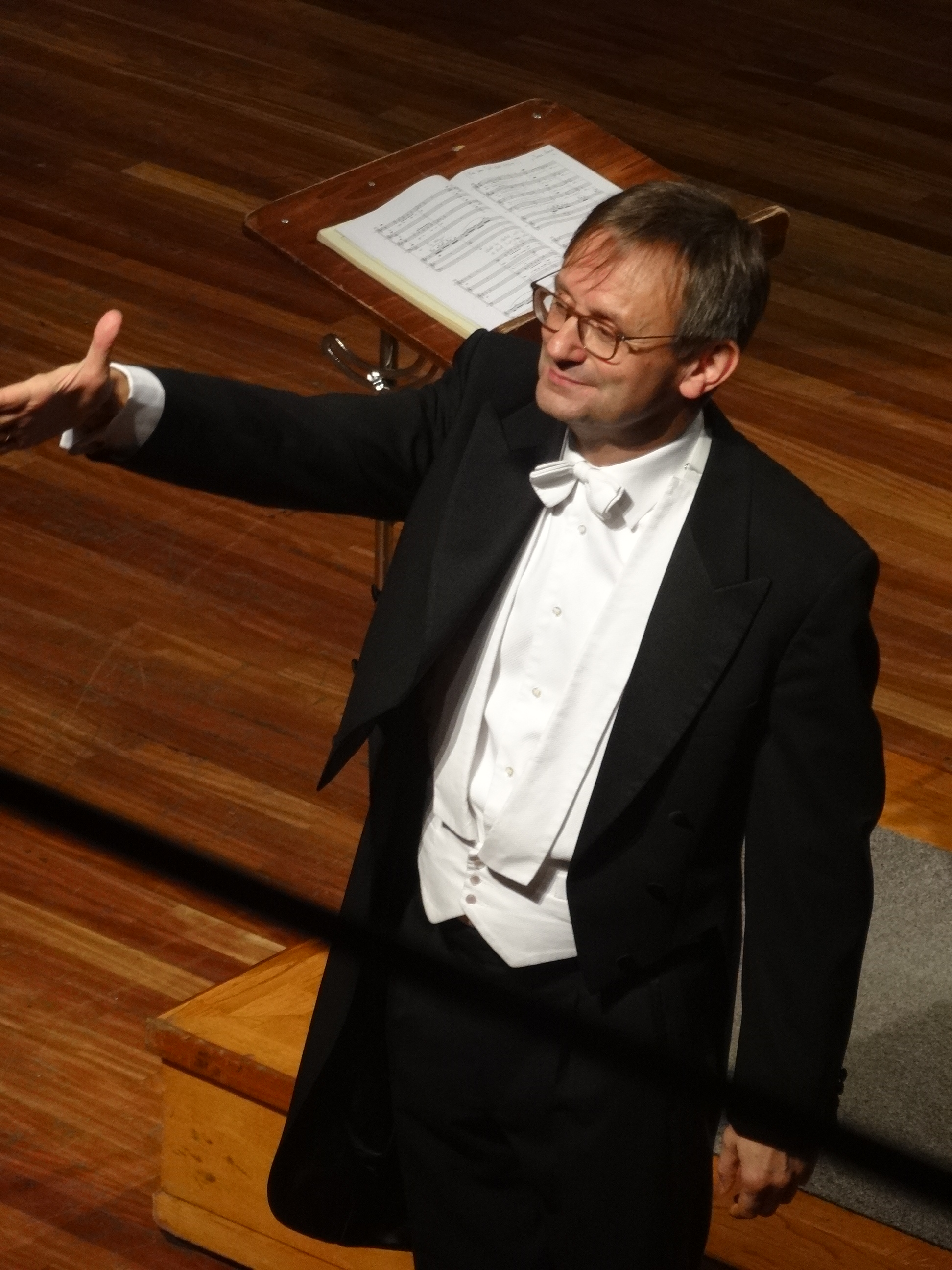
- Simon Halsey at the Palau de la Música Catalana, Barcelona (2016)
- Born: 8 March 1958 (age 68); London, England
- Education: Royal College of Music
- Occupation: Choral Conductor

Simon Halsey, CBE (born 8 March 1958) is an English choral conductor. He is artistic advisor and choral director of the Oslo Philharmonic, principal guest conductor and choral ambassador of the Orfeó Català, principal guest conductor of the WDR Rundfunkchor Köln, and the chorus director of the City of Birmingham Symphony Chorus (CBSO Chorus), a position he has held since 1983. He is also conductor laureate of the Berlin Radio Choir and choral director emeritus of the London Symphony Chorus. In 2025, he was made emeritus professor of music at the University of Birmingham.

== Early career ==
Born in London, Halsey sang in the choirs of both New College, Oxford and King's College, Cambridge. He studied conducting at the Royal College of Music in London.

In 1987, he founded the City of Birmingham Touring Opera (since 2001 the Birmingham Opera Company) with leading international opera director Graham Vick. In addition, he was artistic director and founder of the professional choir European Voices, and principal conductor, choral programme, for the Royal Northern Sinfonia from 2004 until 2012.

He founded the City of Birmingham Youth Chorus in 1995. His position with the CBSO Chorus brings him into regular contact with the City of Birmingham Symphony Orchestra, including as conductor of the annual Christmas concerts.

Halsey served as chief conductor of the Netherlands Radio Choir (Groot Omroepkoor) from 1997 to 2008. He was international chair of choral conducting of the Royal Welsh College of Music & Drama from 2008 until 2014.

== Positions ==
Since 1983, Halsey has been the chorus director of the City of Birmingham Symphony Chorus. From 2016 to 2025, he was the artistic director of the choruses of Palau de la Música Catalana, in Barcelona, and the Chorus Master of Orfeó Català. Simon Halsey has served as artistic director of choral activities at the Oslo Philharmonic since January 2025. In 2012, he was the founding director of the Berlin Philharmonic's youth choral programme "Vocal Heroes".

From 2012 to 2024, he was chorus director of the London Symphony Chorus, and continues his association as conductor emeritus.

From 2001 to 2015, he served as chief conductor and artistic director of the Berlin Radio Choir (Rundfunkchor Berlin). He gave his last concert in this role on 31 May 2015, his replacement being Dutch conductor Gijs Leenaars. Halsey continues his association with the choir under the title of Conductor Laureate.

He was involved in the BBC Proms in 2012–2015, preparing choirs for performances of Michael Tippett's A Child of Our Time (2012), Ralph Vaughan Williams' A Sea Symphony, Britten's War Requiem and Elgar's The Dream of Gerontius.

Other positions included artistic advisor of Schleswig-Holstein Musik Festival Choir Academy (since 2014), professor and director of Choral Activities, University of Birmingham (from 2012-2025), and international chair of choral conducting for the Royal Welsh College of Music & Drama. (2008-2014).

Halsey has worked with orchestras and choirs all over the world. He has also conducted projects as diverse as Handel's Messiah with the Minnesota Orchestra and Fauré's Requiem with the CBSO Chorus and the Hong Kong Philharmonic. With the Berlin Philharmonic, he worked on a performance of Britten's Noye's Fludde, for the tenth anniversary of Berlin Phil Education. He is also currently the artistic director for Crowd Out, a massive work for chorus composed by David Lang. He has collaborated with director Peter Sellars for several oratorios.

Halsey has also been involved with numerous recordings, including a live recording of Beethoven's 9th Symphony with the CBSO Chorus and the Vienna Philharmonic, under Simon Rattle. In 2006 he conducted the CBSO Chorus in their first completely choral recording, an album of English Choral Favourites. In addition, Halsey is consultant editor on Faber Music's Choral Programme Series of sheet music.

== Awards ==
Halsey has won numerous awards, including three Grammys for Best Choral Performance. One in 2008 for a recording of Brahms' Ein Deutsches Requiem, by the Berlin Radio Choir and the Berlin Philharmonic, conducted by Simon Rattle. Another in 2009 for Stravinsky's Symphony of Psalms, Symphony in C and Symphony in Three Movements, by the Berlin Radio Choir, Berlin Philharmonic and Simon Rattle. His third Grammy was in 2011 for Saariaho's L'Amour de loin, by the Berlin Radio Choir and Deutsches Symphonie-Orchester, conducted by Kent Nagano.

He has also obtained a number of other awards for his work, including a Diapason d'Or from Diapason magazine in France; a BBC Music Magazine award, and has won several German Echo Klassik awards.

Halsey was awarded the Bundesverdienstkreuz (Order of Merit of the Federal Republic of Germany) in 2010, and has three honorary doctorates, from Warwick University, the University of Central England and Birmingham University. In March 2015 he was awarded the 2014 Queen's Medal for Music.

Halsey was appointed Commander of the Order of the British Empire (CBE) in the 2015 Queen's Birthday Honours.
