= Michigan State University Children's Choir =

The Michigan State University Children's Choir (MSUCC) is a Grammy Award-winning children's choir located in East Lansing, Michigan. In 2009, Kristin Zaryski was named director, succeeding the founder of the choir, Mary Alice Stollak. Following Ms. Zaryski, Kyle Zeuch was named Director. After 5 years, Kyle Zeuch departed for Lebanon Valley College. He was succeeded by current director Alison Geesey-Lagan. Most choristers in the choir come from the two other children's choirs in the program, the CMS Singers, and Preparatory Choir. The choir has performed at Carnegie Hall in New York City, Orchestra Hall in Detroit, Symphony Center in Chicago, and the Kennedy Center, in Washington D.C. In 2006, the choir won two Grammy Awards for their contributions to William Bolcom's Songs of Innocence and of Experience: Best Choral Performance and Best Classical Album.

== History ==
Founded in 1993, the choir's founder and director was Mary Alice Stollak. Stollak led the MSU Children's Choir in performances at such prestigious venues as Carnegie Hall, Detroit's Orchestra Hall, and Chicago's Symphony Center. Some of their notable performances include:

1998: American Choral Directors Association Central Division Convention, Detroit, MI

1999: American Choral Directors Association National Convention, Chicago, IL

2000: The Detroit Symphony Orchestra, Neemi Jarvi, Conductor. Carmina Burana

2000: premiere performance and recording of "Symphony No. 4 (The Gardens)" Ellen Taaffe Zwilich, composer, Leon Gregorian, conductor.

2002: Sixth World Symposium on Choral Music: International Federation of Choral Musicians Official Representative of the United States, chosen by audition. Seventy-Three countries and 3000 delegates represented with only thirty-two choirs accepted for performance. Minneapolis, MN

2003: American Choral Directors Association-Michigan: Grand Rapids, MI

2004: American Choral Directors Association Central Division Convention: Indianapolis, IN

2004: Grammy Award winning recording of William Bolcom’s "Songs of Innocence and of Experience", with University of Michigan ensembles, Leonard Slatkin conducting.

2005: Premiere: John Burge’s "Angels’ Voices" with the Lansing Symphony Orchestra, Gustav Meier, conducting. "Angels’ Voices" has since won the Association of Canadian Choral Conductors’ 2006 Outstanding New Choral Composition.

2006: premiere performance of Marjan Helms’ "Voices of a Vanished World", a large scale multi-media presentation exploring the emotional and spiritual implications of the Holocaust, particularly as seen through the eyes of children. This two-hour work draws on the melodic contours and instrumental colors of Yiddish folk music, as well as Jewish liturgical chant.

2007: performance of the Pulitzer Prize winning work, "On the Transmigration of Souls", with composer John Adams conducting the Detroit Symphony Orchestra and the UMS Choral Union.

2009: premier performance of “Songs For Lada” Alla Borzova, composer, Leonard Slatkin conducting the Detroit Symphony Orchestra. Sung completely in Belarusian, this 40 minute work for children's choir was recorded on the Naxos label.

The MSU Children’s Choir has been chosen nine times, through audition, to perform for national, division and state conventions of the American Choral Directors Association, under Stollak’s direction.

Thirty treble choral works have been commissioned by the MSU Children’s Choir and are published with major choral publishing companies.

May, 2009: The choir performed for the last time with their retiring founding director, Mary Alice Stollak, at the Wharton Center for Performing Arts for their Farewell Concert.

== Recordings ==
The Michigan State University Children's Choir has recorded several albums:

1.Songs from the Heart

2.What Sweeter Music

3.A Classic Christmas

4.America the Beautiful: Songs of Our Heritage

5.Rejoice!, traditional Christmas music recorded in the historic chapel of the School Sisters of St. Francis, Milwaukee

6.Songs of Sorrow, Songs of Hope, containing works with texts written by children caught in the Holocaust and in the Bosnian war

7.Songs of Innocence and Of Experience – A Musical Illustration of the Poems of William Blake by William Bolcom: Naxos Recording Leonard Slatkin, Conducting, University of Michigan Orchestra and Ensembles

8.Voices of a Vanished world

9.This Joy!

10. Zwilich Symphony No. 4, The Gardens, Koch Records, Leon Gregorian, Conductor, MSU Orchestra and ensembles. Premiere Performance and Recording

11. Songs for Lada, Alla Barzova composer. Naxos Recording release, spring, 2011. Leonard Slatkin, Conductor, Detroit Symphony Orchestra. Premiere Performance and Recording

12. " Michigan Music Conference 2017" "Sound Waves Recording" Performed January 19–21, 2017. Kyle Zeuch Conductor

== Current news ==
Alison Geesey-Lagan is the current director of the Michigan State University Children's Choir.

The choir rehearses every Tuesday and every other Saturday of each month.
