= Thomas E. Peck =

American clergyman, theologian, and author

Thomas Ephraim Peck (January 29, 1822 – October 2, 1893) was an American clergyman, theologian and author, and a recognized intellectual leader of Presbyterian Church during the 19th century.

== Early life ==
Peck was born in Columbia, South Carolina. As a young man he attended the College of South Carolina, and under the influence of James Henley Thornwell that he came to accept the Christian faith.

== Ministerial and theological work ==
Peck's pastorates included Broadway Presbyterian Church in Baltimore, Maryland First Presbyterian Church in Lynchburg, Virginia, and Central Presbyterian Church in Baltimore.

Peck and Stuart Robinson started a monthly periodical, the Presbyterian Critic and Monthly Review, with the purpose of reforming the Presbyterian Church. It primarily argued against church boards and presented the case for church committees and appropriate church government.

Peck also was a professor at Union Theological Seminary.
