= Gregg Smith Singers =

American choral ensemble founded by conductor and composer Gregg Smith

The Gregg Smith Singers is a mixed chorus from the United States, directed by Gregg Smith (August 21, 1931 – July 12, 2016). The group, which comprises 16 singers, was founded at an all-Japanese Methodist church in West Los Angeles, California in 1955, while Smith was studying for his master's degree in music at the University of California, Los Angeles. The group moved to New York in 1970.

The group's repertoire ranges from the colonial-era American compositions of William Billings to contemporary works by Morton Feldman as well as many works by Smith himself. They have also performed works by William Duckworth, Arnold Schoenberg, Elliott Carter, Charles Ives, Earle Brown, Edwin London, Blas Galindo, Jorge Córdoba, Harold Blumenfeld, Irving Fine, Morton Gould, William Schuman, Louise Talma, Arthur Sullivan, Randall Thompson,and Ned Rorem, as well as early music by composers such as Giovanni Gabrieli and Heinrich Schütz. They have also made a well received yuletide album entitled "Christmas Songs from around the World" whose arrangements have also been performed by other choruses, chorales, and choirs as well.

The Gregg Smith Singers have toured the United States 40 times, in addition to 16 tours of Europe, and three visits to Asia. It has recorded over 100 albums, on the Albany, Columbia, Cp2, CRI, Crown, Koch International Classics, Lovely Music, New World, Newport Classic, Sony, Crown, Everest and Vox labels.

The Gregg Smith Singers have performed with numerous orchestras and worked with Igor Stravinsky for 12 years beginning in 1959, until the composer's death in 1971. The group has received three Grammy Awards.
