= Warren Martin =

American classical composer

Warren Brownell Martin (1916 - 1982) was an American composer of classical music. He is best known for his humorous musical comedy (comic oratorio)The True Story of Cinderella (1955).

Martin entered Westminster Choir College in 1932 at the age of 15. He graduated in 1936. After earning his bachelor's and master's degree there, he went on to assume an organist/choirmaster position in Los Angeles, returning after serving a stint in the army, and then onto Chicago. He returned to Westminster in 1951 to devote 31 years to an academic career, serving on that college's faculty from 1950 until his death in 1982. He served variously as head of the Graduate Department, as musical director, as conductor of the Symphonic and Westminster Choirs, and as head of the Theory Department. He conducted the Westminster Symphonic Choir in a recording of Beethoven's 9th Symphony by Bruno Walter and the Columbia Symphony Orchestra (CBS).

His musical versatility is reflected in his compositional output, which includes orchestral music, solo and chamber music for a variety of instruments, and a large body of choral and solo vocal music.

The True Story of Cinderella is presented frequently for the students by members of the voice faculty at Westminster Choir College.

Most of Martin's compositions remain unpublished, in manuscript form. An archive of his compositions exists in the Special Collections department of Talbott Library (located at Westminster Choir College).
