= John McCarthy (conductor) =

British choral conductor and composer

John McCarthy OBE
- McCarthy circa 1960s
- Born: Eugene Patrick John McCarthy; 20 November 1916; London, United Kingdom
- Died: 8 April 2009 (aged 92); London, United Kingdom.
- Other name: John Mac
- Occupations: Conductor; Composer
- Years active: 1927–2009
- Organizations: Ambrosian Singers; London Symphony Orchestra; Royal Opera House
- Spouse: Margaret Quigley
- Children: 3

Eugene Patrick John McCarthy OBE (20 November 1916 - 8 April 2009), also known professionally for most of his career as John Mac or simply Mac, was a three-time Grammy Award-nominated director and conductor of choral music.

== Early life ==
Born in London to Irish parents, McCarthy was educated at the Oratory School in Kensington and then on a scholarship at St. Edmund's School near Ware, Hertfordshire, after which he attended the Royal College of Music. His first recording was in 1927 while still a boy performing as a soprano. He later worked at a bank, and in 1940 married to Margaret Quigley with whom he had twin daughters and a son. After serving during the Second World War, he studied privately under Mátyás Seiber, a prominent composer and conductor, and also sang professionally as a tenor during that period.

McCarthy was involved in sports in his youth, particularly in water polo. He was a reserve member of the British water polo team for the 1948 Olympic Games.

== Musical career ==
In 1951 McCarthy together with Denis Stevens founded a choral group known as the Ambrosian Singers to provide choral polyphony for the BBC series, The History of Music, which Stevens produced. By the 1960s the group had grown to include 700 singers from which smaller groups could be selected. He also went on to found The John McCarthy Singers.

From 1961-66 McCarthy was the chorus master of the London Symphony Orchestra. The LSO's chorus of this era has been described as "simply the Ambrosian Singers under another name". In the mid-1960s McCarthy moved into opera music, and worked with artists such as Joan Sutherland, Placido Domingo and Luciano Pavarotti. In 1981 he was made the chorus master of the Royal Opera House. He was also director of music at the Carmelite priory in London. Performances conducted by McCarthy were included in the films Chariots of Fire and Amadeus.

== Awards ==
He conducted the Ambrosian Singers in performances that received three Grammy nominations, one in 1968 for a performance of Handel's Messiah, one in 1969 for a performance of Shostakovich's Symphony No. 2 in C Major, and one in 1976 for conducting a rendition of Cherubini's Requiem in D Minor, all in the "Best Classical Choral Performance" category. He received his OBE in 1989 for services to music.
