= Conspirare =

American choral group

- Choir
- Founded: 1991
- Founder: Craig Hella Johnson
- Artistic Director: Craig Hella Johnson
- Headquarters: Austin, Texas
- Label: Harmonia Mundi
- Website: conspirare.org

Conspirare is a choral ensemble based in Austin, Texas. They were formed in 1991 by conductor and musical director Craig Hella Johnson as New Texas Festival but did not begin to regularly perform until 1999. They have released more than 25 albums and one DVD and have been nominated for eight Grammy Awards. Their sixth Grammy-nominated album, The Sacred Spirit of Russia (Harmonia Mundi HMU 807526), was the winner of the 2015 Grammy Award for Best Choral Performance. Conspirare has commissioned works from composers including David Lang, Tarik O'Regan, Jocelyn Hagen, Donald Grantham, Eric Whitacre, Nico Muhly, Mark Adamo, Robert Kyr, Jake Heggie, Eric Banks, and Jake Runestad.

== History ==
Conspirare, originally New Texas Festival, was formed in 1991 as a week-long series of vocal performances every summer in Austin, Texas. They did not begin having a fuller schedule of concerts until 1999. They regularly play music festivals in the area including specials for Christmas and in celebration of the music of Bach. They have also played such renowned venues as Carnegie Hall and Lincoln Center. Their music was featured in the 2006 documentary The Mystery of Love.

== Recordings ==
=== through the green fuse ===
Their first release was 2004's through the green fuse on Clarion Records. It was recorded in early August 2004 over two days at the Skywalker Ranch. Robert Faires of The Austin Chronicle described the album's qualities as "sensitivity to text, purity of vocal tone, and, of course, those long, lush harmonies, with voices melding seamlessly into sounds that are achingly lovely". Tracks include "Deep River" and "Sleep".

=== Requiem ===
Requiem, their second offering, was also on Clarion in 2006, and was re-released on Harmonia Mundi Records in 2009. It was recorded at the Troy Music Hall, Troy, New York. The album has a "somber theme of death and loss", with Requiem Masses by Herbert Howells and Ildebrando Pizzetti and a memorial for tsunami victims by Eliza Gilkyson. The album received two Grammy nominations for Best Engineered Album, Classical and Best Choral Performance. In 2010, it received an Edison Award, the Dutch equivalent on a Grammy.

=== Threshold of Night ===
Tarik O'Regan: Threshold of Night is Conspirare's third release. It is a collection of compositions by Tarik O'Regan. The chorus is accompanied by the Company of Strings. It was released by Harmonia Mundi Records in 2008. The album was recorded in October 2007, and like Requiem, at the Troy Music Hall. The tracks are based on the works of Edgar Allan Poe, Pablo Neruda, Kathleen Raine and Emily Dickinson. The album debuted at number ten on the Billboard Top Classical Album chart and received two Grammy nominations for Best Classical Album and Best Choral Performance.

=== A Company of Voices ===
Their fourth recording, A Company of Voices - Conspirare in Concert, was released on May 12, 2009 by Harmonia Mundi on both CD (HMU 907534) and DVD. It was recorded live at the Long Center for the Performing Arts in Austin, TX in October 2008. Instrumentalists included Bion Tsang (cello) and Thomas Burritt (percussion). The show was recorded by the local PBS station, KLRU for a television special that began airing nationally February/March 2009. The CD received a Grammy nomination for Best Classical Crossover Album.

=== Sudden Light: Christmas at the Carillon ===
In 2010 Craig Hella Johnson invited Patrice Pike to join with Conspirare on a live recording with the Company of Voices, featuring Pike on three solo songs: a cover of Annie Lennox's "Why", plus original compositions "Volcanoes" and "The Calling".

=== Sing Freedom! ===
Harmonia Mundi released the group's collection of spirituals, Sing Freedom!: African American Spirituals on September 13, 2011 (HMU 807525), wherein new arrangements were presented alongside older settings. The CD included the premiere recordings of arrangements by David Lang and Tarik O'Regan plus original compositions by Robert Kyr and Kirby Shaw. Three settings by Craig Hella Johnson were also included. Recorded October 2010 at Sauder Concert Hall, Goshen, IN.

=== Samuel Barber: An American Romantic ===
On September 12, 2012 Harmonia Mundi released Samuel Barber: An American Romantic (HMU 807522), choral music by Samuel Barber. The CD featured new chamber versions of The Lovers and Easter Chorale written especially for Conspirare by Robert Kyr. Featuring David Farwig, baritone, and Chamber Orchestra. Additional solos by Matt Tresler, Estelí Gomez, and Derek Chester. With Faith Debow, piano, and Thomas Burritt, timpani. Recorded September 2011 at Sauder Concert Hall, Goshen College, IN. The recording also included Agnus Dei, Barber's choral arrangement of his 1936 Adagio for Strings. The album debuted at #10 on the Traditional Classical Album Billboard chart on September 29, 2012.

=== Sing Joy - Conspirare Christmas 2017 ===
Released on April 5, 2019, Conspirare released Sing Joy - Conspirare Christmas 2017. The live album was recorded in December 2017 at the Carillon in Austin, Texas and features 23 stunning Christmas songs. Big Love is the first focus track from Best Choral Performance Grammy Winner (2014) Conspriare's Contemporary Choral release featuring singer-songwriter Carrie Rodriguez (Americana Chart topper who has performed on Austin City Limits, The Tonight Show, A Prairie Home Companion and has been profiled in Rolling Stone, the New York Times, the Times of London, the New Yorker, the Washington Post). Rodriquez' album 'Lola' was counted among NPR's top 50 Albums of 2016.
