= Joseph Flummerfelt =

American conductor (1937–2019)

- Born: February 24, 1937; Vincennes, Indiana
- Died: March 1, 2019 (aged 82); Indianapolis, Indiana, U.S.
- Education: DePauw University
- Occupation: Conductor

Joseph Flummerfelt (February 24, 1937 – March 1, 2019) was an American conductor. He taught at Westminster Choir College in Princeton, New Jersey for three decades. He was a co-founder of the Spoleto Festival USA in Charleston, South Carolina in 1977, and its director of choral activities from 1977 to 2013. He was also the chorus master of the Festival dei Due Mondi in Italy from 1971 to 1993. According to The New York Times, he "played an outsize, if not always highly visible, role in American classical music."
