= Steven Fox =

American conductor of classical music

- Born: June 13, 1978 (age 48); New York, New York, United States
- Genres: Classical music, Baroque music
- Occupation: Conductor

Steven Fox is a Grammy-nominated American conductor of classical music. He is the Artistic Director and Principal Conductor of New York's Clarion Choir & Clarion Orchestra, Music Director of Cathedral Choral Society at Washington National Cathedral and founder of Musica Antiqua St. Petersburg in Russia. Fox has played a significant role in the rediscovery and performance of important Russian works from the 18th, 19th, and early-20th centuries.

== Biography ==
Fox began studying music at the Horace Mann School under pianist John Contiguglia and conductor and composer Johannes Somary. He went on to study Music and Russian at Dartmouth College, graduating as a Senior Fellow with High Honors, and continued his studies at the Royal Academy of Music, London, where he received an MMus degree with Distinction along with three of the institution's awards: the Sir Thomas Armstrong Prize, the Peter Le Huray Award and the Alan Kirby Prize. In 2010, he was named an Associate (ARAM) of the Royal Academy of Music.

== Career ==
Shortly after his graduation from Dartmouth College, Fox traveled to Russia and founded the country's first period-instrument orchestra, Musica Antiqua St. Petersburg. With Musica Antiqua, he revived a lost repertoire of Russian 18th-century music from the court of Catherine the Great. The list of works he has premiered from this period includes the earliest symphony by a Ukrainian composer—Symphony in C by Maksym Berezovsky (c. 1770), which he has conducted in London, St. Petersburg and New York – and Russian composer Dmitri Bortniansky's final opera, Le fils rival, which he conducted in the Hermitage Theater in 2004.

Fox has appeared as a guest conductor with the Rochester Philharmonic Orchestra, the Philharmonia Baroque Orchestra in San Francisco, the Handel and Haydn Society in Boston, Juilliard415 at Lincoln Center, Music of the Baroque in Chicago, the Charleston Symphony Orchestra, the Tucson Symphony Orchestra, the Quebec Symphony Orchestra, and l'Opera de Québec. From 2008 to 2013, he was an Associate Conductor at the New York City Opera, and he has also served as Assistant Conductor for the Metropolitan Opera Lindemann Young Artist Program and Juilliard Opera. Other recent guest conducting engagements have included Handel's Judas Maccabaeus in Vilnius, Lithuania, with Jauna Muzika; and Mozart’s Sparrow Mass at St. Peter's Basilica in Vatican City. He has given master classes in Historical Performance at Yale University and Dartmouth College, and in early oratorio at The Juilliard School. In 2009-2010 he served as Acting Director of Music at historic Trinity Church, Wall Street. And for two years, he was a Preparatory Conductor for the Yale University Schola Cantorum.

In 2006, Fox became the third Artistic Director of The Clarion Choir and The Clarion Orchestra (Clarion Music Society). Over his tenure, the group has expanded its repertoire and given highly acclaimed performances at the Brooklyn Academy of Music, the White Light Festival and Tully Scope Festival at Lincoln Center, the Miller Theatre at Columbia University, and Carnegie Hall. His first three recordings with The Clarion Choir brought light to three significant, lesser known Russian sacred works, and were each nominated for a Grammy award for Best Choral Performance: Maximilian Steinberg's Passion Week, Alexander Kastalsky's Memory Eternal, and Kastalsky's Requiem.

In January 2023, Steven Fox, together with The Clarion Choir, made his Pentatone debut with a recording of Sergei Rachmaninoff’s choral masterpiece, the All-Night Vigil.

== Reviews ==
- Anne Midgette, In J. Reilly Lewis's footsteps: The Washington Post; November 17, 2017
- Erik Levi, Steven Fox conducts The Clarion Choir performing Steinberg's Passion Week: BBC Music Magazine; January 12, 2018
- James Oestreich, Clarion Choir Delves in the Liturgy of St. John Chrysostom, a Rachmaninoff Rarity: New York Times; January 2, 2016
- James Oestreich, Sacred Work, Written in Secret in Leningrad: New York Times; October 30, 2014
- Vivien Schweitzer, Harmonic Complexity That Moved Its Maker: New York Times; January 3, 2014
- James Oestreich, 400-Year-Old Work Gets a Fresh Look: New York Times; April 21, 2010
