= Alfred Nash Patterson =

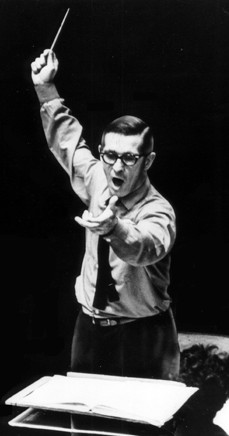
Alfred Nash Patterson

Alfred Nash "Bud" Patterson (1914–1979) was an influential New England choral conductor, teacher, and mentor of choral musicians. Born in Lawrence, Massachusetts and a graduate of Lawrence public schools, he went on to study music at the New England Conservatory of Music, Boston University, and the Berkshire Music Center. He later became an organist and choir director of Christ Church in Cambridge, Massachusetts, where in 1948 he expanded the church choir into a "semi concert choir" of 40–50 voices that he called the Polyphonic Choir. When, the following year, Patterson changed jobs, the group needed to find a new name, and settled on "Chorus pro Musica." The chorus rapidly became known for high-quality performances of new and rarely performed works, and Patterson's stature in the Boston musical community grew correspondingly.

== Career ==
Mr. Patterson began his public career at a time when choral music in the Boston area was in a kind of doldrums:

"Apart from church choirs, there were, essentially, only the Handel & Haydn Society and the Cecilia Society. In their nineteenth-century heyday, each organization had been an important musical force in the city, premiering new works and dusting off seldom heard classics. But they had specialized in oratorios, and no one was writing oratorios much anymore. For much of the first half of the twentieth century, H&H and Cecilia were content to serve up strictly traditional fare."

Interviewed 30 years later, Patterson said, "Our policy was to do unusual things in order to attract those musicians who were challenged by and capable of taking on new things and were tired of the old things."

Patterson's innovative and ambitious programming was there from the start, as in its year of existence the Polyphonic Choir gave the first Boston performances of Aaron Copland's In the Beginning and Benjamin Britten's A Ceremony of Carols, and the American premiere of Ralph Vaughan Williams's Benedicite. This was followed by one of Chorus pro Musica's first performances, the sensational Boston premiere on March 21, 1949. of Mozart's Mass in C minor before a capacity audience at Boston's Trinity Church. For the next 30 years, Patterson's choruses were to continue introducing Boston audiences to both previously neglected and entirely new choral works, many of which have since become choral "standards." Just a few examples are Antonio Vivaldi's Gloria, Maurice Duruflé's Requiem, Igor Stravinsky's Mass, and Francis Poulenc's Figure humaine; And, with the Boston Symphony Orchestra, Poulenc's Gloria (World premiere, in 1961) and Benjamin Britten's War Requiem (North American premiere, at Tanglewood, in 1963).

For over thirty-five years Bud Patterson exerted to the utmost his talent, musical intelligence, charm and elan to the furtherance of the choral arts. In addition to the Chorus pro Musica, Patterson conducted, at various times, the Brandeis University Chorus, the Cape Cod Chorale (that incarnation now defunct), the Worcester County Music Association, and the Worcester Festival Chorus. He taught choral conducting at the Berkshire Music Center at Tanglewood, and was a frequent member of the regional auditions committee for the Metropolitan Opera. He served as organist and choir director first at Christ Church, Cambridge, and later at the Church of the Advent (1949–1960) and at Old South Church in Boston (1960–1979). By turns he prepared choruses for Koussevitsky, Munch, Monteux, Bernstein, Shaw, Leinsdorf, Haitink and others. Some of these prepared choruses included boy sopranos that he trained at the Church of the Advent, where he also played the organ during services. James Hercules Sutton 00:54, June 19, 2012 (UTC)

== Legacy ==
Patterson's sudden death on October 7, 1979, provoked an outpouring of support. A tribute in the Boston Globe called him "a prodigious figure in Boston's musical life," stating: "It was Alfred Nash Patterson's singular achievement to imbue amateur singers with the consistency and high standard of professionals." Composer Daniel Pinkham was quoted as saying, "Bud's great contribution was to new music; for more than 20 years he was the most prominent local figure outside the universities who was doing anything for new music. He commissioned or premiered a large corpus of works; his performance of my St. Mark Passion was a milestone in my own career. Despite his own vivid performing personality, his devotion to the wishes of a young composer was absolutely selfless."

A movement arose to perpetuate his legacy, spearheaded by a large group of singers from several choruses he had led. Donors suggested that commissioning new choral works, building a library of choral music, festivals, tours, and workshops would be fitting projects for funding. This impulse led to the creation of the Alfred Nash Patterson Foundation, presently known as Choral Arts New England, which, among other activities, annually provides financial support to New England choruses and presents a lifetime achievement award to an exceptional New England choral conductor in memory of Alfred Nash Patterson.
