= Glagolitic Mass =

Choral composition by Leoš Janáček

Glagolská mše
- by Leoš Janáček
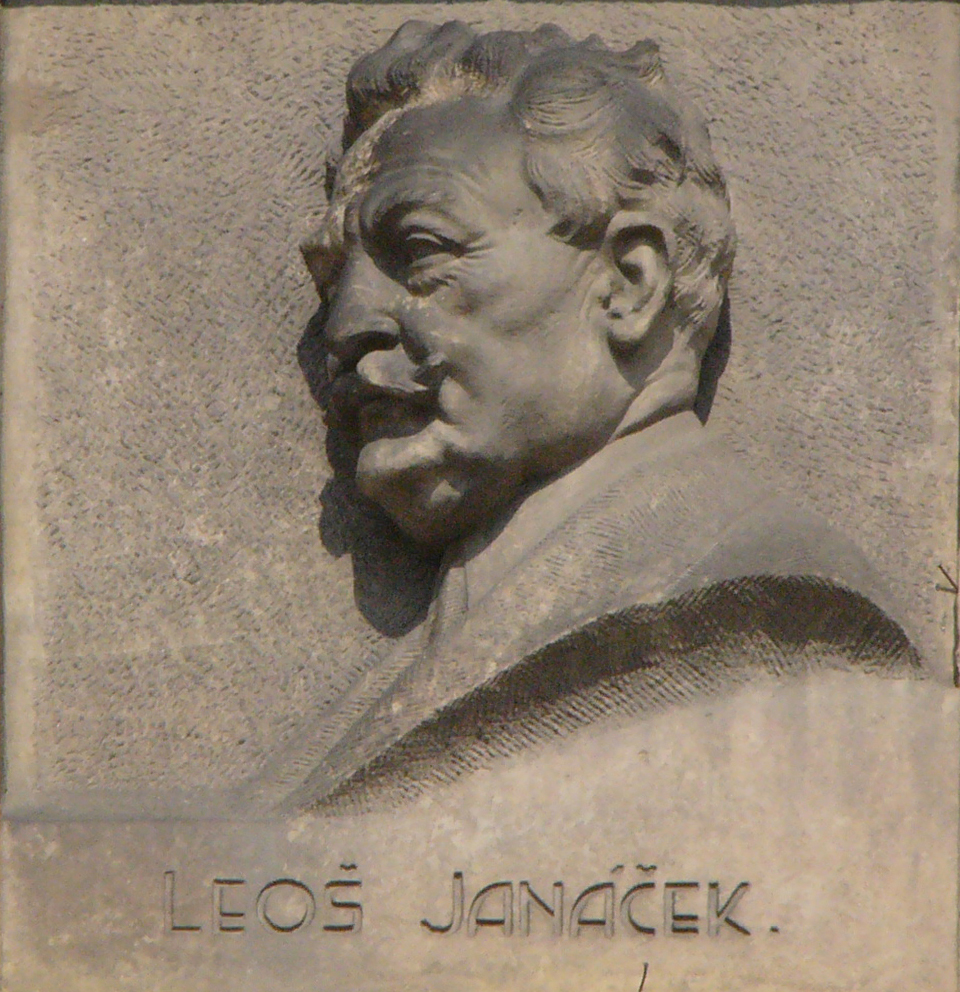
- Relief of the composer
- English: Glagolitic Mass
- Other name: Missa Glagolitica; Slavonic Mass
- Text: Mass
- Language: Old Church Slavonic
- Performed: 5 December 1927: Brno
- Movements: 8
- Vocal: SATB double choir and soloists; soprano, alto and baritone soloists
- Instrumental: Organ; orchestra

The Glagolitic Mass (Czech: Glagolská mše, Church Slavonic: Mša glagolskaja; also called Missa Glagolitica or Slavonic Mass) is a composition for soloists (soprano, contralto, tenor, bass), double chorus, organ and orchestra by Leoš Janáček. Janáček completed the work in 1926. It received its premiere by the Brno Arts Society, conducted by Jaroslav Kvapil, in Brno on 5 December 1927. Janáček revised the mass the next year. The first UK performance was given at the Norwich Festival on 23 October 1930, conducted by Henry Wood.

The Glagolitic alphabet was an early Slavic alphabet, the predecessor of the modern Cyrillic alphabet. In Croatia, the Catholic Church gave permission for the Roman Rite liturgical Mass to be celebrated in Old Church Slavonic at a time when such liturgies were typically only permitted to be in Latin, resulting in the Glagolitic Use Mass.

== Background ==
The text is in Old Church Slavonic, with five vocal movements that correspond to the Catholic Ordinary of the Mass, omitting "Dona nobis pacem" in the Agnus Dei. The musical origins of the work can be traced to Janáček's Latin setting of the Kyrie, Agnus Dei, and Credo for organ and chorus. This was used as a dictation exercise by his composition students in 1908.

Janáček had extensive experience working with choirs, as well as writing a large amount of choral music. It begins and closes with triumphant fanfares dominated by the brass. In between these sections lies particularly vibrant and rhythmic writing for solo voices as well as choir. Curiously, the final movement is titled Intrada, which means entrance. Before this Intrada, Janáček introduces a dramatic organ solo of considerable originality – a moto perpetuo of wild energy. Janáček's Glagolitic Mass is considered an important work of the century and is frequently performed and recorded today.

Janáček was a strong supporter of pan-Slavism, and this mass has been viewed as a celebration of Slavic culture.

Different editions of the score exist, prepared by Paul Wingfield and by Jiři Zahrádka.

== Structure ==
Postludium for pipe organ solo

Its eight movements are:

1. Úvod – Introduction (orchestra)
2. Gospodi pomiluj – Kyrie
3. Slava – Gloria
4. Věruju – Credo
5. Svet – Sanctus
6. Agneče Božij – Agnus Dei
7. Varhany sólo (Postludium) – Organ solo
8. Intrada – Exodus (literally, entrance)

Although this version is considered the "standard" version performed today, research into Janáček's manuscripts suggests that the Intrada was intended to be played at the beginning of the work as well, creating a symmetric, nine-movement form with the Věruju at its center. In addition, several other sections of the work were revealed to have been simplified in meter and orchestration. Some of the movements are reworkings of Janáček's earlier compositions: the Svet, for instance, is derived from the Sanctus of the Mass in E-flat.

== Orchestration ==
The mass is scored for soprano, alto, tenor, and bass soloists, double SATB choir, and an orchestra of 4 flutes (2–4 doubling piccolos), 2 oboes, cor anglais, 3 clarinets (3rd doubling bass clarinet), 3 bassoons (3rd doubling contrabassoon), 4 horns, 4 trumpets, 3 trombones, tuba, timpani, glockenspiel, triangle, snare drum, cymbals, tam-tam, chimes, 2 harps, celesta, organ, and strings (1st & 2nd violins, violas, cellos, and double basses).

== Recordings ==
- Břetislav Bakala, Brno Radio Symphony Orchestra, Moravian Academic Singing Association, The Vach Moravian Lady Teachers' Choir; Libuse Domaninska, Marie Jurenova, Josef Valka, Jaroslav Hromadka (vocal soloists); Frantisek Michalek (organ) (rec. 1951, Supraphon)
- Leonard Bernstein, New York Philharmonic, Westminster Choir (Elaine Brown, chorus director); Helga Pilarczyk, Janis Martin, Nicolai Gedda (tenor), George Gaynes (bass); Bruce Prince-Joseph (organ) (rec. 1963, Sony)
- Karel Ančerl, Czech Philharmonic Orchestra and Chorus (Josef Veselka, chorus director); Libuse Domaninska, Vera Soukupova, Beno Blachut, Eduard Haken (vocal soloists); Jaroslav Vodrazka (organ) (rec. April 1963, Supraphon)
- Rafael Kubelík, Bavarian Radio Symphony Orchestra and Choir (Wolfgang Schubert, chorus master); Evelyn Lear, Hilde Rössel-Majdan (contralto), Ernst Haefliger, Franz Crass (vocal soloists); Bedrich Janáček (organ) (rec. 1964, Deutsche Grammophon)
- Rudolf Kempe, Royal Philharmonic Orchestra, Brighton Festival Chorus; Teresa Kubiak, Anne Collins, Robert Tear, Wolfgang Schöne (vocal soloists); John Birch (organ) (rec. May 1973; organ solo 6 August 1973, Decca)
- Václav Neumann; Czech Philharmonic Orchestra, Czech Philharmonic Chorus; Gabriela Beňačková, Vera Soukupova, Frantisek Livora, Karel Prusa (vocal soloists); Jan Hora (organ) (rec. 1978, Supraphon)
- Ladislav Slovák, Slovak Philharmonic Orchestra; Chorus of the Slovak National Theatre Opera House; Magdaléna Hajóssyová; Viktoria Stracenská; Vilém Přibyl; Richard Novák (vocal soloists) (1979, Opus)
- František Jílek; Brno State Philharmonic Orchestra, Czech Philharmonic Chorus; Gabriela Beňačková, Eva Randová, Vilém Přibyl; Sergej Kopčák (vocal soloists); Jan Hora (organ) (rec. 1979, Supraphon)
- Sir Simon Rattle, City of Birmingham Symphony Orchestra and Chorus; Felicity Palmer, Ameral Gunson, John Mitchinson, Malcolm King (vocal soloists); Jane Parker-Smith (organ) (1981, EMI Classics)
- Sir Charles Mackerras, Czech Philharmonic Orchestra, Prague Philharmonic Choir (Lubomír Mátl, chorus master); Elisabeth Söderström, Drahomira Drobkovà, František Livora, Richard Novák (vocal soloists); Jan Hora (organ) (rec. 1984, Supraphon)
- Klaus Tennstedt, London Philharmonic Orchestra and London Philharmonic Choir, Ameril Gunson, Sheila Armstrong, Robert Tear, William Shimell (vocal soloists) (rec. May 12, 1985) (2007, BBC Legends)
- Michael Gielen, SWR Symphony Orchestra, Slovak Philharmonic Chorus; Ellen Shade, Márta Szirmay, Thomas Moser, Günter Reich (vocal soloists); Imrich Szabó (organ) (rec. 1988, SWR Music)
- Robert Shaw, Atlanta Symphony Orchestra, Atlanta Symphony Chorus; Christine Brewer, Marietta Simpson, Karl Dent, Roger Roloff (vocal soloists), Norman Mackenzie (organ) (rec. 1990, Telarc)
- Michael Tilson Thomas, London Symphony Orchestra and Chorus: Gabriela Beňačková, Felicity Palmer, Gary Lakes, Anatoly Kotcherga (vocal soloists) (rec. 1990, Sony)
- Kurt Masur, Leipzig Gewandhaus Orchestra, Prague Radio Choir; Venceslava Hruba, Rosemarie Lang (contralto), John Mitchinson, Theo Adam (vocal soloists); Michael Schönheit (organ) (rec. 1991, Philips)
- Charles Dutoit, Montreal Symphony Orchestra, Choeur de l'Orchestre symphonique de Montréal; Natalia Troitskaya, Eva Randová, Kaludi Kaludov, Sergei Leiferkus (vocal soloists); Thomas Trotter (organ) (rec. May 16, 1991; Decca)
- Sir Charles Mackerras, Danish National Radio Symphony Orchestra and Choir, Copenhagen Boys Choir; Tina Kiberg, Randi Stene, Peter Svensson, Ulrik Cold (vocal soloists); Per Salo (organ) (based on Janáček's original manuscripts, 1994, Chandos)
- Riccardo Chailly; Vienna Philharmonic Orchestra; Slovak Philharmonic Choir; Eva Urbanová, Marta Benackova, Vladimir Bogachov, Richard Novák (vocal soloists); Thomas Trotter (organ) (1998, Decca)
- Leos Svárovský, Czech Symphony Orchestra of Brno, Czech Philharmonic Chorus of Brno; Eva Drizgová, Hana Štolfová-Bandová, Vladimir Dolezal, Jiri Sulzenko (vocal soloists); Martin Jakubiek (organ) (2000, Ultraphon)
- Antoni Wit, Warsaw National Philharmonic Orchestra, Warsaw Philharmonic Choir; Christiane Libor, Ewa Marciniec, Timothy Bentch, Wojciech Gierlach (vocal soloists); Jaroslaw Malanowicz (organ) (2011, Naxos)
- Marek Janowski, Berlin Radio Symphony Orchestra, Rundfunkchor Berlin; Aga Mikolaj, Iris Vermillion, Stuart Neill, Arutjun Kotchinian (vocal soloists); Iveta Apkalna (organ) (2013, Pentatone)
- Tomáš Netopil, Prague Radio Symphony Orchestra, Prague Philharmonic Choir (Lukáš Vasilek, director); Andrea Danková, Jana Sýkorová, Tomáš Juhás, Jozef Benci (vocal soloists); Ales Barta (organ) (2014, Supraphon; based on original performance version)
- Edward Gardner, Bergen Philharmonic Orchestra and Choir, Choir of Collegium Musicum; Sara Jakubiak, Susan Bickley, Stuart Skelton, Gábor Bretz (vocal soloists); Thomas Trotter (organ) (2016, Chandos)
- Jiří Bělohlávek, Czech Philharmonic Orchestra, Prague Philharmonic Choir; Hibla Gerzmava, Veronika Hajnová, Stuart Neill, Jan Martiník (vocal soloists); Aleš Bárta (organ) (2018, Decca)
- Marko Letonja, Strasbourg Philharmonic Orchestra, Czech Philharmonic Choir of Brno; Malin Byström, Jennifer Johnston, Ladislav Elgr, Adam Plachetka (vocal soloists); Johann Vexo (organ) (2022, Warner Classics)

== Arrangements ==
1. Arrangement suitable for: solo soprano, alto, tenor and bass, mixed chorus, organ and orchestra
  - arrangement for: wind orchestra
  - arrangement by: Karel Bělohoubek
  - performed by: Czech Army Central Band, co Karel Bělohoubek
2. Arrangement suitable for: solo soprano, alto, tenor and bass, mixed chorus, organ and orchestra
  - arrangement for: wind orchestra
  - arrangement by: Josef Šebesta
  - performed by: Prague Castle Guard and Police Wind Orchestra, co Rudolf Rydval
3. Arrangement suitable for: opera
  - arrangement for: fantasy from the opera for saloon orchestra
  - arrangement by: E. Bauer
  - performed by: Dolfi Dauber Saloon Orchestra, co Dolfi Dauber
4. Arrangement suitable for: opera
  - arrangement for: orchestral suite from the opera
  - arrangement by: Peter Breiner
  - performed by: New Zealand Symphony Orchestra, co Peter Breiner

== In film ==
The Glagolitic Mass was used for the music in the 1954 film Inauguration of the Pleasure Dome by director Kenneth Anger.

== Other composers ==
Other composers of a Glagolitic Mass include J. B. Foerster, František Zdeněk Skuherský, the Prague organist Bedřich Antonín Wiedermann, Karel Douša, and more recently Jan Křesadlo and Jan Hanuš. These Glagolitic Masses were mostly intended for liturgical use, prompted by the 1920 limited permission for the Roman Rite Mass to be celebrated in Church Slavonic once again in Bohemia and Moravia.
