= Choral music of Washington, D.C. =

Washington, D.C., and its environs are home to a choral music scene, including choirs and choruses of many sizes and types.

== Choral organizations ==
Note - this section does not discuss particular scholastic / university or church ensembles unless they are independently notable.

=== Symphonic choruses ===
Unlike many American cities, Washington, D.C., features several independent (i.e., non-orchestra-controlled) symphonic choruses, including three major organizations with annual budgets exceeding $1 million.

The Choral Arts Society of Washington presents an annual concert series at the Kennedy Center, performs frequently with the National Symphony Orchestra (NSO), and in recent years has performed with prominent symphony orchestras from Philadelphia, Baltimore, London, Russia (Mariinsky), and China (Qingdao). It regularly participates in nationally televised events such as the Kennedy Center Honors and A Capitol Fourth. It also tours internationally every 3–4 years, including a landmark tour to Russia in 1993 with Mstislav Rostropovich and the NSO, two trips to the Festival dei Due Mondi in Spoleto, Italy in 1993 and 2001, opening the BBC Proms in London in 2002, performing with Valery Gergiev and the London Symphony Orchestra in 2008, and a visit to China with the Qingdao Symphony Orchestra in 2015. The Choral Arts Society is the largest choral organization by budget in the Washington area. The organization also includes a vocal chamber ensemble.

The Washington Chorus, previously known as the Oratorio Society of Washington, is directed by Dr. Eugene Rogers and dedicated to reframing classic choral repertoire, revitalizing overlooked or underrepresented works, and commissioning new music. It is the largest chorus in Washington D.C, with over 220 singers on its roster. TWC regularly partners with the National Symphony Orchestra (over 300 performances), Baltimore Symphony Orchestra, and National Philharmonic, with regular Kennedy Center performances and several international tours, most recently in 2024 to Argentina. In 2000, the chorus (then led by Robert Shafer) received the Grammy Award for Best Choral Performance for its live recording of Benjamin Britten's War Requiem. TWC was the first major Washington area chorus to be founded independent of a church or college, and the first major symphonic chorus in the United States to be directed by an African-American.

The Cathedral Choral Society is the oldest symphonic chorus in Washington, founded in 1941 by Paul Callaway and directed by J. Reilly Lewis from 1985 to 2016. It performs primarily at the Washington National Cathedral but also appears regularly at the Kennedy Center and other local venues.

Finally, the City Choir of Washington was established under the direction of Robert Shafer in 2007 in the wake of his departure from the Washington Chorus.

In Virginia, the 120-voice Fairfax Choral Society has been a community institution since 1962. The Choralis Foundation, founded in 2000 in Falls Church, supports a symphonic chorus and four other auditioned choirs of various types The 200-voice New Dominion Chorale (founded in 1991) performs symphonic repertoire, but is structured as a "singers' cooperative" and does not require auditions to participate.

=== Mid-size choruses ===
There are a large number of mid-size choruses in the Washington, D.C., area, including the Washington Master Chorale which was formed in 2009 by former singers from the Master Chorale of Washington.

Many ensembles have a particular focus on specific geographic, demographic, or ethnic communities of interest. These include the 100-voice Capitol Hill Chorale (founded in 1993) based in the city's Capitol Hill neighborhood, which occasionally performs symphonic repertoire and has a tradition of performing works of the Orthodox liturgy. The Congressional Chorus, founded in 1987, is a multigenerational performance-based community chorus that promotes American choral music and concerts involving dance, poetry, and spoken word artists. It incorporates a senior-focused program, NorthEast Senior Singers (NESS), an auditioned adult SATB chorus, an a cappella chamber ensemble, and an American Youth Chorus (AYC) for students in grades 3-8.

The 50-voice 18th Street Singers (formed in 2005) is composed of young professionals, Zemer Chai: The Jewish Chorale of the Nation's Capital," founded by conductor Eleanor Epstein in 1976, is one of the nation’s leading Jewish choirs. The choir sings the full range of Jewish choral repertoire, from classical and liturgical pieces to world Jewish folk music in multiple languages, and new works composed especially for the choir. The choir frequently collaborates with other D.C area choirs, such as Chorale Contigas and the Heritage Signature Chorale, and performs at Interfaith and community events. Zemer Chai has performed at the White House, the Library of Congress, Strathmore, and the Kennedy Center, as well as concert halls in Boston, New York, and Philadelphia Kolot HaLev (Voices of the Heart), founded by Hazzan Dr. Ramon Tasat in 2008, is the only independent Jewish community choir in the DC area that does not require singers to audition. Kolot HaLev is the choir-in-residence at Shirat HaNefesh (Song of the Soul) Congregation, and also offers annual concerts exploring the vast treasury of Jewish music, from Italy to Russia.

In the Maryland suburbs, the 40-voice Maryland Choral Society (formed in 1971) is a community choral group based in Prince George's County, Maryland. In Virginia, the 90-voice teaching choir Vienna Choral Society (founded in 1986) draws audiences from the DC-metro region, and the 80-voice Reston Chorale (founded in 1967) serves western Fairfax County. The 45-voice Alexandria Choral Society (established in 1970) focuses on choral repertoire while the Alexandria Singers (founded in 1975) focus on American popular music.

=== Men's choruses ===
The 60-voice Washington Men's Camerata (founded in 1984) has been directed by Frank Albinder since 1999 and performs annually at the Kennedy Center. The Camerata has released critically acclaimed recordings, and maintains a National Library of Men's Choral Music.

The Gay Men's Chorus of Washington, D.C. (founded in 1981) has more than 250 singing members, performs music across a range of styles, and regularly conducts outreach performances, with a dual mission that includes "champion[ing] gay equality." The National Men's Chorus was founded in 1999 by Thomas Beveridge, soon after his departure as director of the Men's Camerata.

The Suspicious Cheese Lords (founded in 1996) is a men's early music ensemble that focuses on the rediscovery of unknown Renaissance polyphony. Founded by a group of friends with a shared interest in the music of Thomas Tallis and currently comprising about a dozen members, the group's mission is to promote early music throughout the greater Washington area.

=== Women's choruses ===
- Illuminare – women's ensemble specializing in early music
- Capital Accord Chorus – women's chorus in Silver Spring, MD, singing four-part a cappella harmony
- Capital Harmonia – women's chorus focused on arrangements by women composers and performances promoting women's issues.
- Washington Women's Chorus – 35-member chorus performs works ranging from 11th-century chants, to compositions by Vivaldi and Brahms, and new works by American and international composers
- Voix de Femmes

=== Gospel and African-American heritage choruses ===
The 130-voice Washington Performing Arts (WPA) Men and Women of the Gospel Choir, founded in 1991 and directed by Stanley Thurston, performs regularly at the Kennedy Center and other local venues. Thurston is also the founder and director of the Heritage Signature Chorale, which focuses on African-American spirituals as well as classical repertoire.

Other area ensembles include Mosaic Harmony in Fairfax County, Virginia, as well as Patrick Lundy and the Ministers of Music based in Maryland.

=== Chamber choirs ===
The Washington area has a large number of chamber vocal ensembles. The Washington Bach Consort, founded in 1977, presents concerts using a professional chorus and orchestra using period instruments. The Bach Consort is noted for performing the music of Johann Sebastian Bach and his contemporaries, and performs a monthly series of weekday noontime cantatas in downtown Washington in addition to regular concert performances. The Thomas Circle Singers (founded in 1976) have a dual mission that includes donating ticket proceeds to area non-profit organizations, and have been recognized for both community involvement as well as musicianship.

Lux (founded in 2014) is a professional chamber choir of 16-22 voices founded and run by college-aged musicians, based in Hyattsville, MD and specializing in contemporary choral music. Founded by member Robby Napoli, Lux has been met with some of the highest compliments from professors of local conservatories, the world's most loved composers, professional musicians, and casual audience members. Garnering praise from high-profile composers Eric Whitacre and Paul Mealor, they are dedicated to "excellence, innovation, and accessibility in choral performance."

The Cantate Chamber Singers (founded in 1984) perform concerts in Maryland and D.C. featuring a broad range of repertoire from the past five centuries, and have released several recordings on national labels. Cantigas focuses on music from the Latino tradition, while Voices 21, also based in Maryland, focuses on music of the 15th, 16th, 20th, and 21st centuries including rarely performed works.

Carmina (founded in 2004), based in Falls Church, Virginia, focuses on early music from the Middle Ages through the early Baroque period. The Voce Chamber Singers (founded in 1989) are based in Reston while the Master Singers of Virginia are based in Loudoun County.

Polyhymnia (founded in 1991), a 20-25-voice a capella chamber chorus directed by Steve Beck, performs good music from all periods (Renaissance to modern) and many cultures, frequently including less-well-known pieces that should be heard more often. Polyhymnia is based in Bethesda Md and gives concerts in Md, DC and Va. Polyhymnia follows a "pay what you will" policy: performances are free but donations are accepted.

=== Children's choirs ===
- Maryland State Boychoir – 150 singer choral ensemble, with young men ages 6–20. Based in Maryland, regularly performs in Washington D.C.
- American Youth Chorus, affiliate of the Congressional Chorus, for youth 8 to 14 from all over the Washington metropolitan area.
- Cantate Children's and Youth Choir of Central Virginia – brings classical choral music to the children and youth of Central Virginia
- Strathmore Children's Chorus
- Children's Chorus of Washington – 150 singer children’s choral ensemble
- World Children's Choir – Offers rehearsals and performance training for children and teens ages 4 – 18 from the Washington, D.C., area
- D.C. Boys Choir – Offers membership, by audition, to boys ages 9–13 who are enrolled in the D.C. public schools
- Washington Youth Choir – free after school music education and college preparatory program for students ages 13 to 19

=== Barbershop choruses ===
Men's

- Alexandria Harmonizers
- Harmony Express Men's Chorus
- Singing Capital Chorus – Washington chapter of the Barbershop Harmony Society

Women's

- Potomac Harmony Chorus
- Vienna-Falls Chorus of Sweet Adelines International
- Heart of Maryland Chorus-Sweet Adelines

=== A cappella ensembles ===
Washington, D.C., has a very vibrant a cappella scene. Sweet Honey in the Rock, which formed in 1973 and focuses on music rooted in African American culture, has shared a Grammy Award and received multiple Grammy nominations for its children's albums. Afro Blue, an a cappella vocal jazz ensemble based at Howard University, received significant national attention when it placed fourth on season three of the television show The Sing Off in 2011. There are several ″vocal bands″ in the area, while The Capital Hearings bridge the lines between the choral tradition, vocal jazz, and contemporary a cappella.

== Church choirs ==
The Choir of the Basilica is the resident choir of the Basilica of the National Shrine of the Immaculate Conception. The twenty-voice all-professional ensemble gives nearly 100 performances a year, and its performances are often broadcast on the Eternal Word Television Network. The Washington National Cathedral also maintains several resident choirs, including various professional and volunteer ensembles.

The area also includes at least 100 other church choirs, composed of varying mixes of volunteer and professional singers. Singer Source, established in 2003, serves as a local clearinghouse to connect area singers with choirs, including for church jobs and other volunteer and professional opportunities.

== Service choirs ==
Several of the nation's military service choirs are based in Washington, D.C., including:

- U.S. Army Chorus – associated with U.S. Army Band
- Soldiers' Chorus (Fort Meade, MD) – associated with U.S. Army Field Band
- Sea Chanters – associated with U.S. Navy Band
- Singing Sergeants – associated with U.S. Air Force Band

Members of the service choirs are typically full-time professionals.

== History ==
The tradition of choral ensembles in the area is longstanding, with ensembles dating back at least as far as the Civil War era.

=== 1850–1880 ===
Early groups included the Washington Saengerbund, established in 1851, of which a successor version continues to exist today.

=== 1880–1910 ===
A Choral Society of 150 voices (later the Washington Choral Society) was organized in the 1883–84 season, giving its first concert on Feb. 23, 1884. Its success delivering "ten consecutive seasons of concerts, oratorios, and operas" was noted in 1893. In 1896, the Choral Society marked the passing of Henry Clay Sherman, musical director of the "original Choral Society," who had again taken charge of musical duties at the beginning of the 1895-96 season. The Choral Society ran into financial trouble in its 22nd season during 1904-05, but it re-organized and continued. In 1906, Sydney Lloyd Wrightson was elected director, but the following year, Wrightson left the organization in the wake of disagreements and founded a Washington Oratorio Society. The Choral Society replaced its popular annual Messiah performance with Handel's Judas Maccabeus in 1908, and may have formally disbanded that year. A performance in 1911 may have been the last to receive media attention.

The Coleridge-Taylor Choral Society was founded in 1901, was made up of 160-200 African-American singers, and sponsored Samuel Coleridge-Taylor's first trip to the United States.

=== 1910–1930 ===
- 1916 – H.E. Cogswell (temporarily) takes over from Wrightson as Washington Oratorio Society director.

=== 1930–1960 ===
In 1930, the Washington Choral Festival Association was organized. It renamed itself as the Washington Choral Society in 1932, using a name "hallowed by historic associations." The Washington Choral Society was taken over by a civic group in 1934, formally dissolved in 1935, and re-formed under the same name shortly thereafter. Its director, Louis A. Potter, resigned in 1949. Soon thereafter, Paul Callaway was offered the directorship, and it was eventually folded into the Cathedral Choral Society which Callaway had previously formed in 1941.

=== 1960 and beyond ===
Many of the major ensembles still active in the Washington area had their origins in the 1960s and early 1970s.
