= Daniel E. Gawthrop =

American composer

- Born: Daniel E. Gawthrop; 21 October 1949 (age 76)
- Origin: Fort Wayne, Indiana
- Genres: Contemporary classical
- Occupation: Composer
- Instruments: Piano, Organ

Daniel E. Gawthrop (born 1949 in Fort Wayne, Indiana) is an American composer, primarily of choral music. His output also includes a substantial body of works for the organ as well as orchestral and instrumental works. He has been the recipient of over one hundred commissions to write original music. His works have been published by Warner Brothers, Theodore Presser, Sacred Music Press, and others.

== Biography ==
Gawthrop attended Michigan State University, and Brigham Young University.

He served for three years as Composer-in-Residence to the Fairfax Symphony Orchestra (of Fairfax, Virginia, a suburb of Washington, D.C.) beginning in 1990, and has been the recipient of four grants from the Barlow Endowment for Musical Composition. He has been commissioned by various institutions including the American Choral Directors Association through their Brock Commission, and has had works première in the Concert Hall of the John F. Kennedy Center for the Performing Arts, the Salt Lake City Mormon Tabernacle, and Washington National Cathedral. His choral pieces have been performed and recorded by such eminent ensembles as the United States Air Force Singing Sergeants, the Gregg Smith Singers, the Turtle Creek Chorale, the Paul Hill Chorale, the American Boychoir, the Mormon Tabernacle Choir, the Cathedral Choral Society (of Washington National Cathedral), Thomas Circle Singers, and hundreds of other groups in the U.S. and abroad. From 1985 to 1987 Gawthrop worked as a radio announcer for KBYU

In 1991, he established his own publishing company, Dunstan House.

In addition to his work as a composer, Gawthrop has been active as a broadcaster, clinician and adjudicator, organist, conductor, teacher and writer, including a period as music critic for The Washington Post. Gawthrop is a Life Member of the American Choral Directors Association, a member of the American Guild of Organists, and a member of Phi Mu Alpha Sinfonia, the music fraternity, of which he was the Charles E. Lutton Man of Music Award recipient in 2018.

The bulk of his organ works have been recorded on two commercially available CDs. The first, Exultate, was performed by Mary Mozelle on the Princeton University Chapel organ. The second disc, Like a Fire, was performed by David Pickering on the Bales Recital Hall organ at the University of Kansas at Lawrence. The Utah State University Chamber Choir, conducted by Cory Evans, recorded a CD containing much of Gawthop's choral work, called Show Me Thy Ways.

From 2015 to 2019 Gawthrop was the Composer-In-Residence of Renaissance Men, New England's professional male vocal chamber ensemble. The ensemble has commissioned multiple works and has recorded and performed the majority of Gawthrop's men's ensemble repertoire.

Gawthrop resides in southern Idaho with his wife. The couple has five adult children.
