= M. Elizabeth Tidball =

American physiologist

- Born: Mary Elizabeth Peters; October 15, 1929; Anderson, Indiana, US
- Died: February 3, 2014 (aged 84); Adamstown, Maryland, US
- Education: Mount Holyoke College (BA); University of Wisconsin–Madison (MS, PhD); Wesley Theological Seminary (MTS)
- Known for: Advocacy for women in academia and STEM
- Scientific career
- Fields: Physiology
- Workplaces: George Washington University School of Medicine & Health Sciences
- Thesis: The relation of acetylcholine and epinephrine to tonus of intestinal smooth muscle (1959)

Mary Elizabeth Tidball (née Peters; October 15, 1929 – February 3, 2014) was an American physiologist. She was an advocate for women in academia and STEM and a supporter of women's colleges. Tidball was a longtime faculty member at George Washington University School of Medicine & Health Sciences (GW) where she became the institution's first woman appointed professor of physiology. Her research in the 1960s on the career outcomes of graduates from women's colleges versus those from coeducational institutions sparked discussions that continued for decades. Tidball was the first female president of the Cathedral Choral Society where she sang for almost fifty years.

== Early life and education ==
Mary Elizabeth Peters was born on October 15, 1929, in Anderson, Indiana. She completed a bachelor's degree in physiology and chemistry at Mount Holyoke College in 1951. Peters married physician and researcher Charles S. Tidball c. 1953. In 1955, she earned a master's degree in physiology from University of Wisconsin–Madison. Her master's thesis was titled Changes in rate of intestinal absorption of sodium chloride solutions. Tidball earned a PhD in physiology and pharmacology from the same institution in 1959. Her dissertation was titled The relation of acetylcholine and epinephrine to tonus of intestinal smooth muscle. In 1990, received a master's in theological studies from Wesley Theological Seminary.

== Career ==
Tidball joined the faculty at George Washington University School of Medicine & Health Sciences (GW) in 1960. She remained at GW as a researcher and professor in the physiology department until her retirement in 1994. She was the first woman to be appointed professor of physiology at GW. Tidball was recognized as an advocate for women in academia and STEM. She was a champion for women's colleges which, she believed offered advantages such as a larger proportion of female faculty members and administrators. Tidball argued that women need Women-only spaces for their voices to be heard.

Tidball founded the women's task force of the American Physiological Society. She had served as a trustee at several colleges including Hood College, Mount Holyoke, Salem College, Skidmore College, and Sweet Briar College. She was codirector of the Tidball Center at Hood College.

=== Research ===
In the late 1960s, Tidball studied 1,500 listings in the Who's Who of American Women. She found that graduates from women's colleges were two to three times more likely to be included for their professional accomplishments than women from coeducational college's. Criticisms of the study included the lack of controls for socioeconomic status and self-selection bias of student populations. The report was publicized in 1973 and continued to be referenced in discussions about women's education and women in the workforce. It followed the Education Amendments of 1972 which increased the public debate about the role of women's colleges in American society. In the 1970s and 80s, Tidball researched variations of her first study, such as surveys of women in doctoral or medical programs. She coauthored the volume, Taking Women Seriously: Lessons and Legacies for Educating the Majority with Lisa Wolf-Wendel.

== Awards and honors ==
Tidball received the president's medal from GW in 1999 and the order of merit from the Cathedral Choral Society. She was awarded 17 honorary degrees from colleges and universities across the nation.

== Personal life ==
Tidball sang in the alto section of the Cathedral Choral Society for almost fifty years. She served as the chorus' first female president from 1982 to 1984 and was a member of the board of trustees. In 1976, she assisted the chorus as it reestablished itself as a legal entity that was financially separate from the Washington National Cathedral. She helped manage the transition from the founder, Paul Callaway to the new director, J. Reilly Lewis. Tidball and her husband, a GWU professor, donated and designed an organ stop and gargoyle to the cathedral.

The Tidball's resided in Cathedral Heights for years. She died of pancreatic cancer on February 3, 2014, at the Buckingham Choice in Adamstown, Maryland. She was survived by her husband and brother.

Tidball's husband, Charles S. Tidball, was professor emeritus of computer medicine and of neurological surgery at GW.

== See also ==
- Women in physiology
- Timeline of women in science in the United States
