= San Francisco Choral Society =

The San Francisco Choral Society (SF Choral) is a nonprofit organization comprising 150-200 auditioned, volunteer singers dedicated to the performance of choral masterpieces and commissioned works, and accompanied by professional orchestras and soloists. The performance schedule includes two concerts each in spring, summer, and fall, and an annual holiday concert and singalong.

Some of the works that SF Choral has performed include Requiems by Brahms, Mozart, Duruflé, and Verdi; Britten's War Requiem; the Bach B-minor, the Mozart C-minor, and Masses by Bruckner, and Stravinsky; Haydn's Lord Nelson Mass, Handel's Messiah and Israel in Egypt; Mendelssohn's Elijah; Vespers by Monteverdi and Rachmaninoff; Bernstein's Chichester Psalms, and Orff's Carmina Burana. SF Choral has sung pieces by living composers, including Morten Lauridsen, Arvo Pärt, Kirke Mechem, Karl Jenkins, and then-living composer Moses Hogan. And the chorus has commissioned and premiered new works by composers Felicia Sandler, Kirstina Rasmussen, Emma Lou Diemer, Mark Winges, and Donald McCullough.

== Community Outreach ==
SF Choral provides Bay Area high school students with the opportunity to participate in rehearsals and performances at no cost to them. The corporately funded Tickets for Kids program offers free tickets to performances for both junior and high school students. The San Francisco Choral Society offers complimentary tickets to selected Bay Area nonprofit organizations for distribution to staff and those they serve.

== Commissioned Works ==
- Ubi caritas by Kirstina Rasmussen, performed November 2003
- Songs for the Earth by Emma Lou Diemer, performed August 2005
- Time Does Not Bring Relief by Felicia Sandler, performed August 2006
- pax penetralis by Mark Winges, performed November 2007
- Contraries by Donald McCullough, performed August 2009
- Seven Songs for Planet Earth by Olli Kortekangas, co-commissioned with the Tampere Philharmonic Orchestra of Finland, Choral Arts Society of Washington, and Piedmont East Bay Children’s Choir, performed November 2011

== Artistic Directors ==
- Adrian Horn (1989–1992)
- Magen Solomon (1992–1993)
- Robert Geary, ASCAP award winner (1994–present)
