= Robert Shafer (conductor) =

Robert John Shafer Jr. (born January 1, 1946) is a Grammy Award-winning American conductor, classical composer, educator and church musician (pianist, organist). He has served as artistic director of the City Choir of Washington since its launch in September 2007.

== Early life ==
Shafer was born on January 1, 1946, in Mooresville, North Carolina, the son of Col. Robert J. Shafer, USAF (Ret). He started studying piano at age 5. Shafer moved with his parents to Germany in 1951, where they were stationed as part of the United States Air Force. His family settled in Vienna, Virginia, in 1954.

== Education ==
Shafer graduated from James Madison High School, in Vienna, Virginia, returning to teach there after college. In college, he earned a B.M. in piano performance and an M.M. in music composition from The Catholic University of America. Shafer studied music composition and conducting for nine summers with Nadia Boulanger at Le Conservatoire Américain, France.

== Career highlights ==
As an educator, Shafer's work at James Madison High School attracted national attention, especially for his conducting a first-rate madrigal group. He remained on the high school faculty from 1968 to 1975. From 1972 to 2007, Shafer was music director of The Washington Chorus, a leading choral ensemble in the U.S. capital. When he served as music director of the Basilica of the National Shrine of the Immaculate Conception, he composed and conducted a setting of Tu es Petrus in honor of Pope John Paul’s October 1979 visit to Washington, D.C. In 1983, Shafer was appointed artist-in-residence and professor of music at the Shenandoah Conservatory of Shenandoah University in Winchester, VA.

=== Awards ===
Shafer won first prize in composition at Le Conservatoire Américain in 1969. In 1989, he was honored by the State Council of Higher Education for Virginia with an Outstanding Faculty Award for his outstanding public service, research, and teaching. In February 2000, Shafer was honored by the National Academy of Recording Arts & Sciences with a Grammy Award for Best Choral Performance for a live-performance recording of Benjamin Britten’s War Requiem. In 2011 he was awarded the J. Reilly Lewis Award for Outstanding Contributions to Choral Music by The Choralis Foundation.

=== Compositions ===
- Lux Aeterna, Performance Debut: April 2009.
- The Mother and the Lamb (anthem), Performance Debut: December 2010.
- The Annunciation, Performance Debut: December 2014.

=== Recordings ===
- Dvorák: Stabat Mater / Psalm 149. Naxos Classical Music Catalog. Release Date: 24 Sep 2002.
- Berlioz: Requiem. Gothic Records. Release Date: 6 May 2003.
- Britten: War Requiem. Composer: Benjamin Britten. Gothic Records. Re-Release Date: 10 May 2005.
- Noel: A Musical Feast/A Loft & Gothic sampler. Gothic Records, Release Date: 18 Oct 2005.
- The Very Best Of Dvorák. Naxos Classical Music Catalog, Release Date: 31 Oct 2006.
