= Seven Songs =

Seven Songs may refer to

== Literature ==
- Merlin Book 2: The Seven Songs, a 1997 book by T. A. Barron

== Music ==
- Seven Songs, Op. 17 (Sibelius), 1891–1904
- Seven Songs (album), a 1982 album by 23 Skidoo
- Seven Songs for Quartet and Chamber Orchestra, a 1974 album by Gary Burton

== See also ==
- Seven Songs from the Tundra, a 1999 Finnish film
- Seven Songs for Malcolm X, a 1993 British documentary film
- Seven Early Songs (Berg)(c. 1905–1908), musical compositions of Alban Berg
- Seven Songs as Unpretentious as the Wild Rose, a 1901 collection of songs by Carrie Jacobs-Bond
- Seven Romances on Poems by Alexander Blok, a 1967 vocal-instrumental suite by Shostakovich
- Songs and Proverbs of William Blake, a 1965 song cycle of seven songs by Benjamin Britten
- Seven Danish Songs, an 1897 composition by Frederick Delius
- Siete canciones populares españolas (Seven Spanish Folksongs), a 1914 set of traditional Spanish songs arranged by Manuel de Falla
- Seven Songs Seldom Seen, a 1992 video by Toad the Wet Sprocket
- Seven songs from Walter Scott's Lady of the Lake, a song cycle by Schubert, Op 52
- Seven Songs for Planet Earth, a 2011 composition by Olli Kortekangas
- Rückert-Lieder, a 1901–2 song cycle by Mahler, first published in Seven Songs of Latter Days
- Seven Runeberg Songs, a 1891–2 collection of art songs by Jean Sibelius
