= The Capital Hearings =

Background information
- Origin: Washington, D.C., United States
- Genres: Choral, A Cappella, Vocal Jazz, Contemporary
- Years active: 2010-present
- Label: A Cappella Records
- Website: Official website

The Capital Hearings is a vocal ensemble based in Washington, D.C. The ensemble is known for performing a cappella music from a variety of styles, including classical choral works, vocal jazz, American folk songs, and contemporary pop.

The ensemble originated in 2010 as a spin-off from the Choral Arts Society of Washington. It has performed at venues throughout the Washington, D.C. area, including the Kennedy Center, Strathmore, the Phillips Collection, the BlackRock Center for the Arts, and the Atlas Performing Arts Center, in addition to producing its own regular concerts.

The ensemble received early attention when it performed flashmobs at an event on Capitol Hill and for a marriage proposal at Spike Mendelsohn's Good Stuff Eatery. Its debut album, Opening Statement, was nominated for several Contemporary A Cappella Recording (CARA) Awards and was selected as an Album of the Year for 2013 by the Recorded A Cappella Review Board (RARB). More recently, the ensemble participated in performances of a work honoring Supreme Court Justice Ruth Bader Ginsburg.

== Discography ==
- 2013 - Opening Statement
- 2017 - When The Night Is New
- 2020 - Holidays with The Capital Hearings
- 2023 - All Rise
