= Eleanor Daley (composer) =

Eleanor Daley OC
- Born: Eleanor Joanne Daley; April 21, 1955 (age 71); Parry Sound, Ontario, Canada
- Genres: Choral; church music
- Occupations: Composer, choir director, choral clinician, accompanist
- Instruments: Organ; piano
- Years active: 1982–present

Eleanor Joanne Daley OC (born April 21, 1955) is a Canadian composer of choral and church music, church choir director, choral clinician and accompanist. She lives and works in Toronto, Ontario. Among her best-known works are The Rose Trilogy and Requiem.

== Early life and education ==
Daley was born in Parry Sound, Ontario. She earned a bachelor's degree in organ performance from Queen's University at Kingston. She also attained diplomas in piano and organ, studying in both Canada and England.

== Career ==
As a composer, Daley has been commissioned by choral groups and arts organizations throughout North America and Europe. In Canada, she composed for the Elmer Iseler Singers, the Amadeus Choir, the Bach Children's Chorus, the Amabile Youth Singers, Toronto Children's Chorus, the Cantabile Singers of Kingston, the Savridi Singers, the Vancouver Men's Chorus and the Victoria Scholars. In the United States, she was commissioned by the Maryland State Boychoir, the Master Chorale of Tampa Bay, Texas Woman's University and the Texas Choral Directors Association, and received the 2008 Brock Commission from the American Choral Directors Association. Commissions from Europe include festivals in Norway and Germany and England's Oxford University Press. Daley's music has been published by Canadian, US, and UK-based printing houses.

Daley's a capella work "I Sing a Maiden" was performed in New York City in 2014 by a 400-voice choir as part of an International Women's Day celebration. Her work "My Master from a Garden Rose" was recorded by the Genesis Ensemble.

Since 1982 she has served as the music director at Fairlawn Avenue United Church and since 1995 as the accompanist for the Bach Children's Chorus.

She was appointed to the Order of Canada in 2022, "for her contributions to Canadian music and choral culture as a renowned composer and accompanist."

== See also ==
- Music of Canada
- List of Canadian composers
