= Norman Scribner =

American classical composer

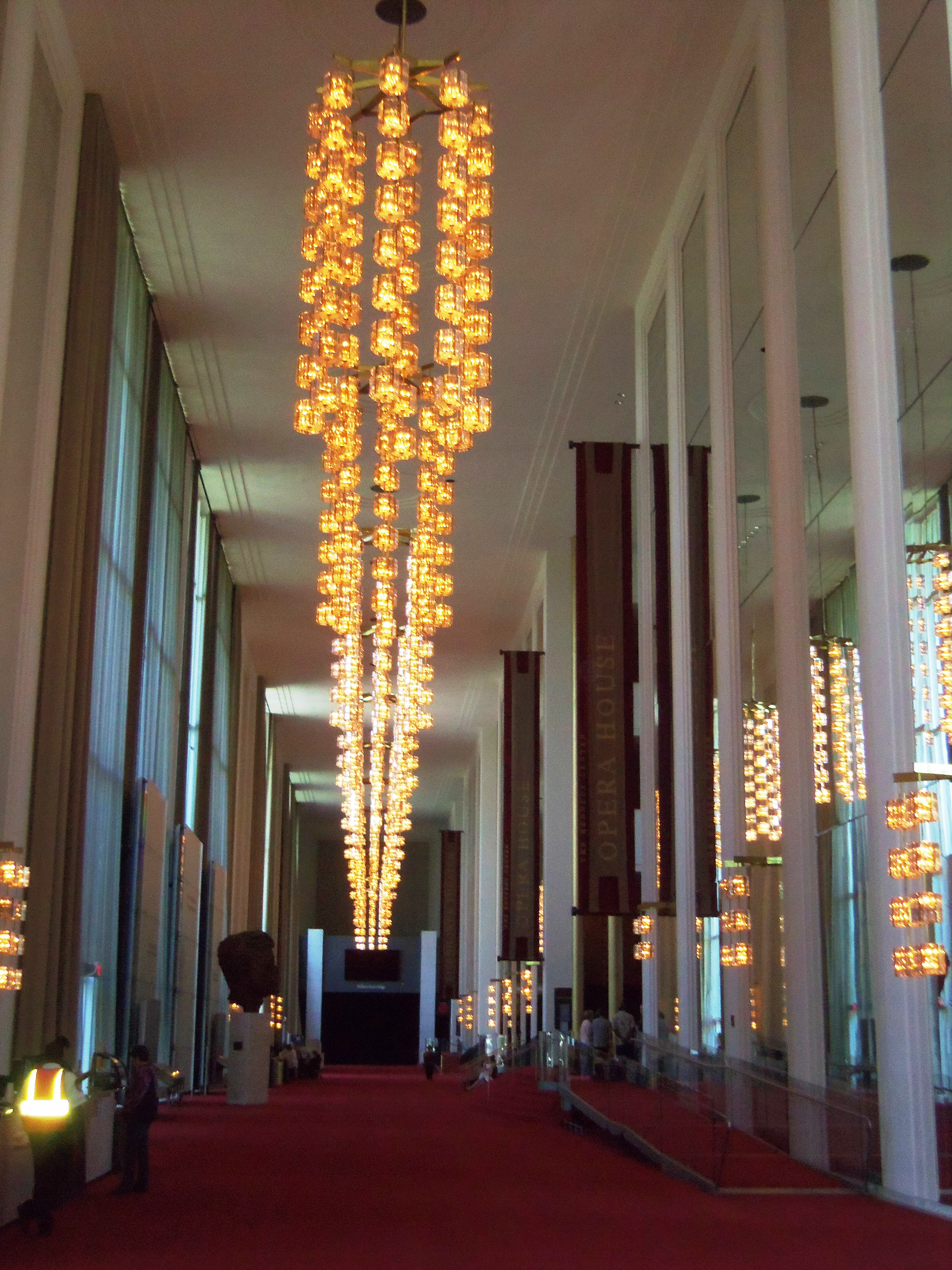

Norman Orville Scribner (February 25, 1936 – March 22, 2015) was an American conductor, composer, pianist, and organist. He was most widely known as the founder of the Choral Arts Society of Washington, where he served as artistic director for over forty-five years.

== Biography ==
Scribner was born on February 25, 1936, in Washington, D.C., the son of a Maryland clergyman appointed the year before he was born. While in high school, he would "rac[e] to the church at 4 a.m. each morning to practice scales," but following his father's death, "financial necessity compelled him to focus on more lucrative forms of music making: church jobs." He attended the Peabody Conservatory of Music in Baltimore, graduating with honors in 1961. He studied organ with Paul Callaway and music theory with Walter Spencer Huffman. While still a student at Peabody, he formed the Baltimore Choral Society and "[s]o perfection-oriented was he that he held sectionals for a junior choir and rigorous auditions" for the group.

In 1960, after a stint in the Army, he accepted a position as musical staff assistant for the Washington National Cathedral, choirmaster of St. Alban's Episcopal Church, and chapel organist for the St. Albans School for Boys. (He served at St. Alban's Church until his retirement in 2007.) In 1960 he also joined the faculty at American University, serving there until 1963. He later joined the faculty at George Washington University from 1963 to 1969, and served on the faculty of the College of Church Musicians of Washington National Cathedral.

=== Rise to prominence ===
Scribner first received significant public attention while serving as assistant organist at the Washington National Cathedral. A review of an organ recital in June 1963 observed that "[i]n the last few years a young musician in town has found the right climate to establish himself as one of those to whom musical leadership and responsibility will be given in years to come." That year, Scribner was appointed as staff keyboard artist for the National Symphony Orchestra, a post he would hold until 1967. He conducted and took control of the Symphony's annual production of Handel's Messiah in 1963 after conductor Howard Mitchell "was impressed by his ability and intensity." A 1964 profile in The Washington Post described him as a "28-year old who looks, despite the glasses which occasionally slip down from his nose and give him the air of a beleaguered English professor, like a football player." It noted that for Scribner, doing music was "the complete life performing as pianist, organist, harpsichordist; directing as choir master at St. Alban's; teaching at George Washington University; conducting."

By 1970, Scribner was viewed as "the backbone of choral music in Washington." As a choral director, he received praise for his "exhaustive musical knowledge, his geniality and infectious fervor, and above all, his obsession with excellence." Moreover, local pianists spoke "of his ability at the keyboard in awe," with "his organ playing almost legendary." With funding from several grants received in 1970, the Choral Arts Society was able to retain Scribner on an annual salary for the first time, allowing him to "devote his full time to the post."

In 1971, Scribner assembled a professional choir (the "Norman Scribner Choir") for the premiere of Leonard Bernstein's MASS, commissioned for the opening of the John F. Kennedy Center for the Performing Arts. He served for a season as chorus master of the Washington Opera, and was a member of the Choral Panel of the National Endowment for the Arts from 1974 to 1976.

In an unusual event on August 25, 1972, Scribner was directing a Kennedy Center performance of Ravel's Introduction and Allegro (for flute, harp, clarinet, and string quartet) when one of the harp's pedals broke. After asking the audience "with a fairly straight face ... 'Is there anyone in the house who repairs harps?'", he altered the program order in the hope of finding "another harp downstairs or if this harp has been fixed." However, a harpist from one of the military service bands was in attendance, returned home and retrieved his instrument while a Schubert symphony was performed, and the concert was saved.

On September 12, 1974, he accompanied the violinist Eugene Fodor at the White House for a recital at a state dinner given by President Ford for Israeli Prime Minister Yitzhak Rabin.

=== The Choral Arts Society of Washington ===
Scribner founded the Choral Arts Society of Washington in 1965 and served as its artistic director for forty-seven years. Since its founding, the Choral Arts Society has grown to become a prominent cultural institution in Washington, D.C., and is one of approximately thirty-two major choral organizations in the United States with annual budgets exceeding $1 million.

As artistic director, Scribner directed the chorus in its regular concerts at the John F. Kennedy Center for the Performing Arts and other locations in the Washington area. He also regularly prepared the chorus for guest appearances with the National Symphony Orchestra and other national and international orchestras. He led the chorus on seven international tours (as of 2010), visiting Argentina, Brazil, England, France, Italy, and Russia. The Choral Arts Society also produced or performed on at least sixteen commercially released recordings during his tenure.

Scribner retired as artistic director of the Choral Arts Society on August 31, 2012, and was succeeded by Scott Tucker. Scribner died March 22, 2015, at the age of 79.

== Compositions ==
- The Nativity (1975) – premiered Dec. 20, 1975 by the Choral Arts Society of Baltimore under Theodore Morrison.
- Love Divine (1984) – commissioned by the United Methodist Church and premiered at its 1984 General Conference in Baltimore.
- Song for St. Cecilia (1988) – commissioned by the British Institute and performed in concert at the Supreme Court of the United States in 1988

== Awards ==
Scribner received a co-nomination for a Grammy Award in 1973 (with Leonard Bernstein), and the Choral Arts Society received a Grammy Award under his preparation in 1996.

He was named a Washingtonian of the Year by the Washingtonian magazine in 1984. He received an honorary degree of Doctor of Humane Letters from Virginia Theological Seminary in 2002, and the Peabody Distinguished Alumni Award in 2006. In 1998, Scribner received the District of Columbia Mayor's Arts Award for excellence in an artistic discipline.
