= Douglas Major =

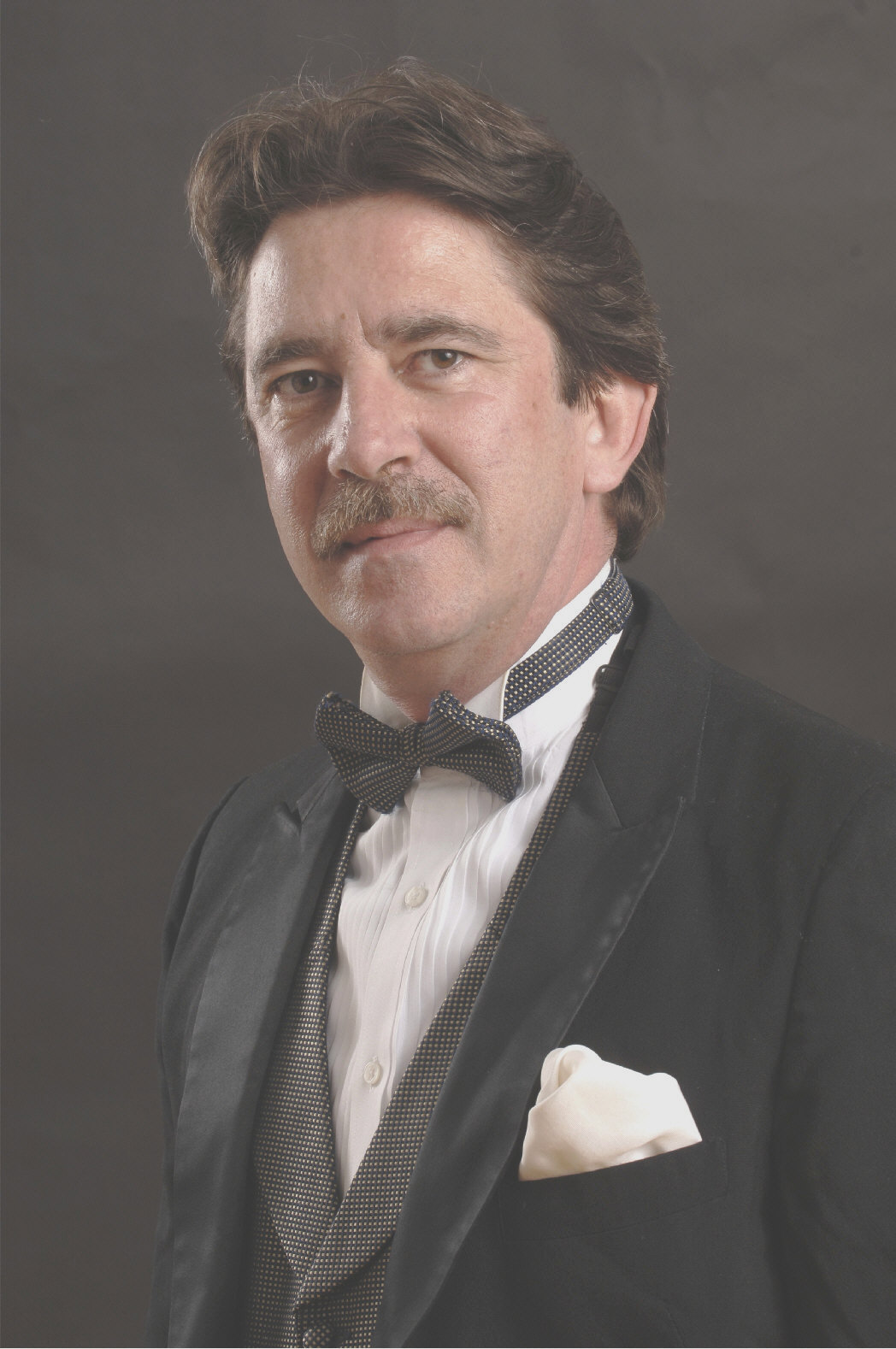
- Born: 1953 (age 71–72); Berwick, Pennsylvania
- Occupation(s): Organist, Choirmaster, and Composer

Douglas R. Major (born 1953 in Berwick, Pennsylvania) is an American composer of sacred music and concert organist. He is the former choral director and organist at the Washington National Cathedral, Washington, D.C., where he frequently performed on nationally televised services and state occasions. He has made several recordings.

Following his tenure at the cathedral between 1974 and 2002, he moved to Massachusetts to concentrate on concert touring and composing. He also became music director at St. Michael’s Episcopal Church in Marblehead, serving there until retiring in 2019.

== Early life and education ==
Major was born in Berwick, Pennsylvania, and at the age of 6 began piano lessons with his grandmother, Rhoda Fetterman. In 1966 Major's family moved to Charleston, West Virginia, where he studied organ with Flora Kuendig. While in Charleston, he held organist positions at Redeemer Lutheran Church, and then at First Presbyterian Church, both in South Charleston. In 1969, his family moved to St. Louis, where he studied organ with Franklin Perkins while in high school at Lindbergh HS. He attended the University of Missouri/St. Louis, where he commenced organ studies with Ronald Arnatt, while serving as his assistant organist at Christ Church Cathedral (St. Louis, Missouri). Major earned a Bachelor of Music degree from Webster University there.

== Career ==
At twenty-one years of age in 1974, he was appointed assistant organist at the National Cathedral by Paul Callaway. He subsequently succeeded Richard Wayne Dirksen as organist and choirmaster at the cathedral in 1988, administering one of the country's largest church music programs and concert schedules, which were frequently attended by heads of state and televised nationally. Among the state occasions occurring during his tenure at the cathedral were the presidential inaugural services for Ronald Reagan, George H.W. Bush, Bill Clinton and George W. Bush; the visit of Queen Elizabeth in 1990 for the dedication of the completed cathedral. He also oversaw, with other staff, the establishment of the Cathedral Girls Choir in 1996.

In 2002, Major left the National Cathedral after 28 years to concentrate on concertizing and composing. Major frequently toured throughout North America, Europe and the Far East. He played over 400 concerts with the Empire Brass Quintet, and as piano accompanist for Elizabeth VonTrapp, playing in 40 US states.

== Recordings and compositions ==
Major has made eight compact disc recordings playing the Washington Cathedral's large pipe organ. In 2009, he released a CD of trumpet and organ music entitled Hope, with trumpeter Richard Watson, recorded at Methuen Memorial Music Hall. Major's compositions for organ and choir include:

- Concertino
- Festival Te Deum
- Love Poem to God, commissioned by the American Guild of Organists
- Mary's Lullaby
- Requiem in C Minor, premiered in Atlanta in 2005
- Sing to the Lord a new song
- Cape Ann Portraits, a suite for organ based upon locations along the Massachusetts coastline

== Personal life ==
Major lives in Salem, Massachusetts. He retired in 2019 as music director at St. Michael’s Episcopal Church in nearby Marblehead, following 16 years of service there.
