= Todd Boss =

American poet

- Born: Todd Ryan Boss; December 6, 1968 (age 57); Marshfield, Wisconsin, U.S.
- Education: St. Olaf College (BA); University of Alaska Anchorage (MFA)
- Occupations: Poet, installation artist, film producer, inventor/patent holder
- Website: toddbossoriginals.com

Todd Ryan Boss (born December 6, 1968) is an American poet, installation artist, film producer and inventor/patent holder, formerly based in Minneapolis, Minnesota, but who now maintains no permanent base of operations. He has published several collections of poetry and contributed to literary journals. He has also produced a large body of poetry intended for musical setting, most frequently in collaboration with the composer Jake Runestad, including the Earth Symphony for chorus and orchestra, winner of an Emmy in the category musical composition.

== Biography ==
Boss was born in Marshfield, Wisconsin to Mr. & Mrs. Jack E. Boss, but raised until age six on a dairy farm in Colby, Wisconsin, when his parents moved to a cattle farm in Fall Creek, Wisconsin.

He attended St. Olaf College from 1987 to 1991, earning a BA in English and speech-theater. He then pursued graduate studies at the University of Alaska Anchorage between 1992 and 1994, earning an MFA in creative writing. In Minneapolis, he teaches at the Loft Literary Center and has been an artist-in-residence at the Weisman Art Museum of the University of Minnesota. He is the father of two children.

On February 2, 2025, he proposed to his life-partner Hila Plitmann on the red carpet of the 67th Annual Grammy Awards.

== Activities and awards ==
Collections of poetry authored by Todd Boss include Yellowrocket (2008), Pitch (2012), Tough Luck (2017), and Someday the Plan of a Town (2022). His poems have also appeared in Poetry, the American Poetry Review, The London Times, The New Yorker, NPR, Best American Poetry, and the Virginia Quarterly Review, which awarded Todd its Emily Clark Balch Prize in 2009 for his collection Yellowrocket. Pitch won the Midwest Booksellers' Choice Award in 2012.

As an installation artist, Boss created a 2012 memorial to a 2007 bridge collapse in Minneapolis in collaboration with the Swedish artist Maja Spasova. The installation was paired with a cycle of 35 poems: "Fragments for the 35W Bridge". He also arranged for a monumental poetry film projection onto the façade of the historic Union Depot in Saint Paul, Minnesota in 2014.

Other public art projects include his poetry wall "Catch the Poetry Bug" of 1999, which was installed on the campus of the University of Pennsylvania. In 2017, he created "Chaos on the Green Line," a virtual-reality thrill ride activated by the GPS movements of a St. Paul light rail train, in partnership with Pixel Farm Creative. Boss's public art projects also include a reinterpreted United States flag; a collaboration with Dakota artist Marlena Myles, "Dakota Spirit Walk," launched in November 2021 at the Bruce Vento Nature Sanctuary in Saint Paul, Minnesota; and the "Dakota Sacred Hoop Walk" at the Minnesota Landscape Arboretum in Chaska, Minnesota.

As an author of poetry for musical setting, Boss has collaborated with Jake Runestad on eight choral works: "Climb," "Ave Verum," "One Flock," "As Long As We Are Here," "Cello Songs," "Waves," "A Silence Haunts Me," and "And So I Go On." He also wrote the poetry for the song cycle Panic by Andy Vores, which was first performed at the Boston Conservatory in 2014, and two song texts for mezzo-soprano Sasha Cooke: "Risk Not None" (with music by Matt Boehler) and "(A Bad Case of) Kids" (with music by Andrew Marshall).

Boss was the founding executive and artistic director of Motionpoems, a poetry film company that operated between 2008 and 2020. Motionpoems produced over 150 short adaptions of poetry that have premiered at the Walker Art Center, the Hammer Museum, and other venues.

He is also the creator and host of the podcast There's a Poem in That, in which he helps strangers discover the poetry in their most intimate stories.

== Selected publications ==
=== Poetry collections ===
- Yellowrocket (New York: W.W. Norton, 2008), ISBN 9780393067682
- Pitch (New York: W.W. Norton, 2012), ISBN 9780393345520
- Tough Luck (New York: W.W. Norton, 2017), ISBN 9780393608625
- Someday the Plan of a Town (New York: W.W. Norton, 2022), ISBN 9780393881400

=== Chapbooks ===
- On Marriage (with Katrina Vandenberg; Red Dragonfly Press, 2008)

== Inventions and patents ==
Boss is the inventor and patent holder of the Laptop Strap personal laptop carrying system of products, launched in 2021, and partners with his cousin, John Hermanson, for the patent-pending Limber Bows, a sporting-goods product also launched in 2021.

== Contributions of text for compositions by Jake Runestad ==
Boss's collaborations with Jake Runestad are detailed on the composer's website.

Choir and orchestra

- "Climb" (2017, SATB choir and orchestra), text by Todd Boss
- "Ave Verum" (2017, SATB choir and string orchestra), first performed 23 April 2017 at the John F. Kennedy Center for the Performing Arts, Washington, DC, with the Choral Arts Society of Washington, Scott Tucker, conductor
- Earth Symphony (2022, SATB chorus and orchestra), commissioned by True Concord Voices & Orchestra, Eric Holtan, conductor

Choir and instrumental ensemble

- "One Flock" (2016, SATB, soloists, piano, and percussion), commissioned by Schola Cantorum on Hudson, Deborah Simpkin King, conductor, text by Todd Boss
- “As Long As We Are Here” (2020, SATB choir, string orchestra, and piano), commissioned by Brett Karlin and the Master Chorale of South Florida
- "Cello Songs" (2020, SATB choir, cello, and piano), commissioned by the St. Charles Singers

Choir and piano

- "Waves" (2015, SSAATTBB choir and piano), commissioned by Robert Istad and California State University, Fullerton
- "A Silence Haunts Me" (2018, SATB choir and piano), commissioned by the American Choral Directors Association and the Raymond C. Brock Foundation

Unaccompanied choir

- "And So I Go On" (2015, SSAATTBB), commissioned by Jonathan Talberg and Edith Copley in memory of German Aguilar, first performance by the Bob Cole Conservatory of Music Chamber Choir at California State University, Long Beach
- "How'll You Know," first performed by the San Antonio Chamber Choir, May 2023
