= One Night Stand (opera) =

One Night Stand Finnish: Yhden yön juttu) is a one-act opera by Finnish composer Olli Kortekangas and librettist Michael Baran. The work was composed from 2009-2010.

It was commissioned by the Sibelius Academy and premiered in the Helsinki Music Center in October 2011 for the program, "OPERA, MASTER." In 2011, Kortekangas noted that the opera shared similarities with his previous opera, "Daddy's Girl."

Karyl Charna Lynn of Opera Now regarded the opera as "a 21st century opera that speaks to a 21st century audience in its language and music."
