= Gail Winslow =

American stockbroker (1929–2015)

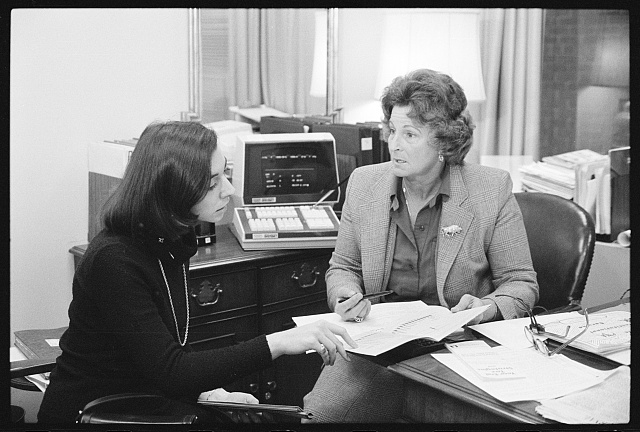
Pioneer woman stockbroker Gail Winslow, who held a top position at Ferris & Co. in Washington, DC in 1979.

Gail Winslow (Dec. 2, 1929 – Sept. 12, 2015) was a stockbroker, financial planner, and tax expert at the Washington, D.C. firm Ferris & Co (later Ferris, Baker Watts Inc., now owned by Royal Bank of Canada). When she became a registered representative of the New York Stock Exchange in 1957, Winslow was part of a small number of women stockbrokers in the U.S. capital. In a career that spanned nearly 60 years, Winslow was outstanding in her service to women clients and support of women entering the financial industry. The annual Gail Winslow Award at RBC Wealth Management recognizes women at the firm who recruit and support women financial advisors, leaders, and clients.

== Family and education ==
Born Gail Hamilton Whitehead on December 2, 1929 in Baltimore, Maryland, she was the daughter of Allen Whitehead and Carolyn Myers. She attended Radcliffe College in Massachusetts and married Alan F. Winslow with whom she had two children. They later divorced and she married again in 1959 to Air Force officer Robert N. Ginsburgh. Together they raised six children.

While Ginsburgh held significant positions as an assistant to the Chairman of the Joint Chiefs of Staff, member of the National Security Council's staff, and military aide to President Lyndon B. Johnson, he supported Winslow in her career. He eventually chose to retire from the military in 1975 rather accept an assignment that would separate the family geographically. Ginsburgh died in 1992.

Winslow was involved as a board member for many organizations including Trinity College in Hartford, Connecticut, the Choral Arts Society of Washington, WETA-TV Washington D.C.'s PBS member station, the Washington Area Tennis Patrons Foundation, and the YWCA. Her career in finance spanned nearly 60 years. She continued to be involved with her clients and associates until her death at the age of 85 on September 12, 2015 in Lewes, Delaware.

== Career ==
Winslow began working for Ferris & Co. in 1956 helping with the telephone switchboard, filing and taking on the role of all-purpose assistant, known in the 1950s as a "Girl Friday." Finding finance and investing compelling, she qualified for a broker's license six months later and became a registered representative of the New York Stock Exchange in 1957. Winslow received an invitation rarely extended to women to visit the all-male trading floor of the New York Stock Exchange in 1958. At the time, she was just one of a couple of female stockbrokers in the Washington metropolitan area.

Winslow became a general partner of Ferris & Co. in 1965 and was named a vice chairman in 1977. Ferris & Co. merged with the Baltimore firm Baker Watts in 1988, which was later acquired by the Royal Bank of Canada. Winslow became a senior vice president-financial advisor with the Royal Bank of Canada after it acquired Ferris, Baker Watts in 2008. She held the position until her death in 2015.

Winslow recalled in a 2014 interview that the head of Ferris & Co., recognized a need for women in the financial industry. Early in her career, Winslow specialized in the investment needs of women, recognizing the growing number of divorced women seeking advice. Over time, Winslow established a group practice overseeing four additional brokers, three of which were women. Due to her ease in public speaking and ability to clearly explain the intricacies of the stock market, she regularly led seminars and gave presentations to schools, women's groups, and other community organizations. While her client base initially comprised mostly women, it grew to an approximate 60–40 split of women and men.

In honor of her outstanding work, Ferris, Baker Watts registered a seat on the New York Stock Exchange in her name in the 1990s. Her career spanned 60 years and RBC Wealth Management established the annual Gail Winslow Award in her honor. The award is given to "women at the firm who demonstrate exemplary efforts to help attract, support and retain women financial advisors, leaders and clients."
