= The 18th Street Singers =

Washington D.C. choir

- Origin: Washington, D.C., United States
- Genres: Choral, A Cappella, Contemporary
- Years active: 2004-present
- Website: www.18thstreetsingers.com

The 18th Street Singers is an all-volunteer 50-voice choir based in Washington, D.C. The ensemble is known for performing choral music from a variety of styles, from Renaissance polyphony to contemporary classical music.

The ensemble was founded in 2004 and has performed at venues throughout the Washington, D.C. area, including the White House, the Kennedy Center, and the National Gallery of Art; they have also been repeatedly invited to the Piccolo Spoleto Festival in Charleston, South Carolina. They gave a televised live performance at President Barack Obama’s first Christmas tree lighting and performed in 2018 as back-up singers for Demi Lovato and in 2019 for Hugh Jackman’s "The Man. The Music. The Show." world tour.
