= Paul Hill (musician) =

American musician

Paul Hill (1934 – September 27, 1999) was the founder and music director of the Master Chorale of Washington, formerly the Paul Hill Chorale.

Paul Hill was also involved in television, and his 1978 production of Menotti's "The Unicorn, the Gorgon and the Manticore" won an Emmy Award.
