= Katrina Vandenberg =

American poet

Katrina Vandenberg is an American poet.

== Career ==
Vandenberg is the author of two books of poetry and one chapbook. Her work has been called "emotionally resonant and intellectually ambitious." Her first book, Atlas, was a finalist for the Minnesota Book Award in 2005. A reviewer described her second collection of poetry, The Alphabet Not Unlike the World, as "taking thoughts about everyday stories and experiences and weaving them into profound poetic portraits about the larger things in life." She is an Associate Professor of creative writing at Hamline University in Saint Paul, Minnesota.

== Publications ==
=== Poetry collections ===
- The Alphabet Not Unlike the World (Milkweed Editions, 2012, ISBN 978-1-57131-446-8)
- Atlas (Milkweed Editions, 2004, ISBN 978-1-57131-419-2)

=== Chapbooks ===
- On Marriage (with Todd Boss; Red Dragonfly Press, 2008)
