= John B. Haberlen =

American conductor

John Black Haberlen has served as the Director of the Georgia State University School of Music since 1996. Dr. Haberlen is a past national President of the American Choral Directors Association.

== Education ==
Haberlan has a Bachelor of Science and Master of Music degrees from Pennsylvania State University and a Doctor of Musical Arts degree in choral conducting with a minor in music literature from the University of Illinois.

He studied choral music and opera in Ludwigsburg, Germany and completed a year of choral study in London with the London Bach Society. The Penn State Alumni Board of Directors chose him to receive the 1994 Alumni Achievement award.

== Career ==
Haberlen began his professional career at the age of 16 as a percussionist in the Wheeling Symphony Orchestra. Upon receiving his Bachelor and Masters, he performed as principal timpanist with the Florida Symphony Orchestra.

Haberlen is Professor of Music and has served as Georgia State University Director of the School of Music since 1996. He served as Associate Dean for the Fine Arts in the College of Arts and Sciences and as Director of Choral Activities at Georgia State University for over 20 years.

Haberlen is a past national President of the American Choral Directors Association and served on the board of the International Federation of Choral Musicians for six years.

His conducting debut at Carnegie Hall in 1990 featured a performance of Poulenc's Gloria and resulted in a return conducting engagement of Brahms’ Requiem in 1992. he conducted an all-Vaughan Williams concert in Avery Fisher Hall in New York's Lincoln Center in 1996. In Atlanta, He has prepared choruses for the late Maestro Robert Shaw and the Atlanta Symphony Orchestra. As chorus master of the Atlanta Ballet, he trained the chorus for over 20 performances of Orff's Carmina Burana and six performances of Stravinsky's Symphony of Psalms. For three summers he conducted choruses and orchestras in England's Wells Cathedral.

Haberlen has participated as a jury member and auditor in major choral festivals worldwide, including the St. Petersburg Choral Festival, the World Choir in Cardiff, Wales; Marktoberdorf, Germany; Riva del Garda, Italy; Budapest, Hungary; Denmark and Sydney, Australia. He has been honored by his selection as a jury member of two World Choral Olympics (Linz, Austria and Busan, Korea).

He has published two books, two essays, nine articles and more than 50 choral editions, and he has guest conducted festival choruses in over 35 states.
