= Master Chorale of Washington =

The Master Chorale of Washington, formerly the Paul Hill Chorale, was a symphonic choir based in Washington, D.C., composed of approximately 126 auditioned volunteer choristers and twenty-four professional choristers. Its most recent music director was Donald McCullough (1997–2009).

== History ==
The chorale was founded in 1967 by Paul Hill as an informal group of about 35 singers. In 1969, Hill recruited an additional 44 singers to perform Beethoven's Fidelio with the National Symphony Orchestra (NSO). Over the next 42 years, the chorale rose on the Washington choral music scene and established itself as a prominent chorus in the nation's capital. Over the years the chorale has appeared in hundreds of concerts at the John F. Kennedy Center for the Performing Arts, including performing in the center's inaugural concerts in 1971, at Wolf Trap's Filene Center, Carnegie Hall, Notre Dame de Paris, the Cathedral of Chartres in Chartres, France, and the Washington National Cathedral. For nearly three decades, under the leadership of its founder and music director Paul Hill, the chorale performed a series of concerts at the Kennedy Center as well as appearing as guest chorus for the NSO under the batons of Howard Mitchell, Antal Dorati, Dmitri Kabalevsky, Julius Rudel, Erich Kunzel, Neville Marriner, Mstislav Rostropovich and Leonard Slatkin. In addition, the chorale appeared in performances with entertainers including Victor Borge, Julian Lloyd Webber, Garrison Keillor, Danny Thomas, Christopher Plummer, and Peter Schickele, and with notable arts organizations including the Philadelphia Orchestra, Royal Ballet, Washington Opera, Dance Theatre of Harlem, Joffrey Ballet, Richmond Symphony, Fairfax Symphony Orchestra and Pacific Northwest Ballet. For twenty consecutive years, the chorale hosted the Kennedy Center's free annual Messiah Sing Along with Maestro Hill directing orchestra, chorus, and 3,000 guests in the Hallelujah Chorus.

The chorale's continuing success led to the establishment of a core of paid professional singers and the forming of a sister chamber choir, the Washington Singers. Sondra Goldsmith Proctor and J. Thomas Mitts, respectively, served as rehearsal accompanists and assistant directors in addition to performing on keyboard with the chorale in numerous concerts.

In the 1990s Maestro Hill was diagnosed with amyotrophic lateral sclerosis (ALS), also known as Lou Gehrig's Disease. In December 1993, he conducted the chorale's final Kennedy Center Messiah Sing Along seated on a stool. President William Clinton, First Lady Hillary Clinton, and Chelsea Clinton attended the event. In 1997, Donald McCullough, founder of the McCullough Chorale and Virginia Symphony Chorus in Norfolk, Virginia, became the group's second music director, replacing the ailing Paul Hill, who was awarded the title Conductor Emeritus. Soon after the name was changed from the Paul Hill Chorale to Master Chorale of Washington.

Under Maestro McCullough, the chorale maintained its reputation for choral excellence, expanding its professional core to twenty-four professional choristers, premiering numerous works by American composers, and producing several CDs.

In March 2009, the Master Chorale's board of directors, citing financial difficulties due to the 2008 financial crisis, voted to dissolve the organization at the close of the 2008–2009 season. The chorale's last performances with the National Symphony Orchestra were April 9, 10, and 11, with Kurt Masur conducting an all-Brahms program, including the choral work A German Requiem by Johannes Brahms.

On May 17, 2009, the Master Chorale, conducted by Maestro McCullough, performed their final concert to a full house in the Kennedy Center Concert Hall. The program opened with a talk by Robert Aubrey Davis. The chorale accompanied by orchestra performed Randall Thompson's Frostiana and, joined by soloists and children's chorus, Carl Orff's Carmina Burana.

== Discography ==
=== Paul Hill Chorale ===
- Russia! (1994)
- A Paul Hill Chorale Christmas (1995)
- Unequaled Praise (1996)

=== Master Chorale of Washington ===
- Christmas with the Master Chorale of Washington (1999)
- Melodious Accord (2001)
- Holocaust Cantata: Songs from the Camps, (1999), Music by Donald McCullough, Lyrics by Denny Clark
