= Washington Bach Consort =

Founded in 1977 by J. Reilly Lewis, the Washington Bach Consort is a professional chorus and orchestra based in Washington, D.C. that is noted for its performance of 18th-century music on period instruments. It has appeared at numerous festivals and has made three critically acclaimed European tours. Recordings include Bach's complete motets, the Magnificats of both J.S. Bach and C.P.E. Bach, the first American recording of the F Major and G minor Masses, and three solo soprano cantatas featuring Elizabeth Futral.

The Consort recently completed Bach's entire 215-cantata cycle. In association with this monumental achievement, the Library of Congress has welcomed the Washington Bach Consort's performance recording and concert program archives into its permanent collection.

The ensemble has been led by Dana Marsh since September 2018. This appointment followed a long search following Lewis's sudden death in 2016.
