= Seven Songs for Planet Earth =

Seven Songs for Planet Earth is a 2011 composition by Olli Kortekangas. It was commissioned by the Choral Arts Society of Washington and the Tampere Philharmonic Orchestra, in conjunction with the San Francisco Choral Society and Piedmont East Bay Children's Choir, and premiered at the Kennedy Center in Washington D.C. on May 22, 2011 under the baton of Norman Scribner. It received it west coast premiere and second performance on May 19, 2011 in San Francisco, conducted by Robert Geary.
