= Olli Kortekangas =

Finnish composer (born 1955)

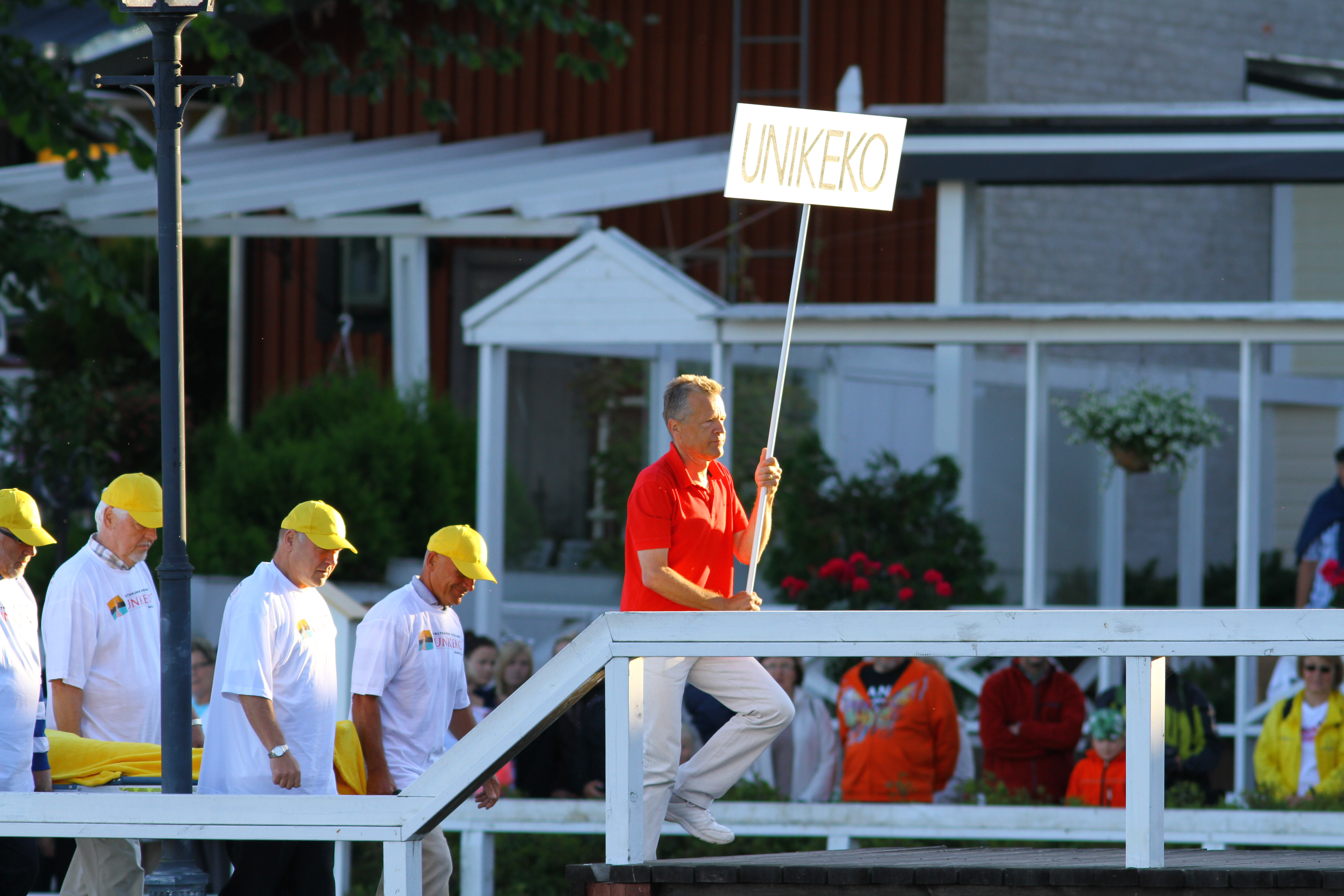
Olli Kortekangas

Olli Paavo Antero Kortekangas (born 16 May 1955) is a Finnish composer.

Kortekangas was born in Turku. His early career in music began at Espoon Musiikkiopisto (Espoo Music Institute) and the youth choir Candomino. He then studied at the Sibelius Academy as a pupil of Eero Hämeenniemi and Einojuhani Rautavaara from 1974 to 1981, and completed his studies in West Berlin with Dieter Schnebel and in San Diego (UCSD) with Roger Reynolds. Later he has held teaching positions at the Sibelius Academy and the National Theater Academy. He was Composer-in-Residence at Oulu Sinfonia from 1997 to 2007.

== Career ==
He has composed about 150 works covering a broad range, from choral works and instrumental miniatures to orchestral music and operas. He has received commissions from ten countries. Among his recent large-scale works are Seven Songs for Planet Earth, commissioned by the Choral Arts Society of Washington and the Tampere Philharmonic Orchestra, Migrations for mezzo-soprano, male voice chorus and orchestra, commissioned by The Minnesota Orchestra and recorded by BIS Records, and the song cycle Songs of Meena, commissioned by The Helsinki Philharmonic Orchestra.

Kortekangas is particularly known for his choral music and operas, of which the latest are Messenius ja Lucia (2004), Daddy's Girl (2007), One Night Stand (2011), Oma vika (Own Fault, 2015), Veljeni vartija (My Brother's Keeper, 2018), and Koria täti (2021), as well as the church operas Elämänkuvat (Pictures of Life, 2019) and Ende und Beginn (2021). Kortekangas's work list also includes a number of chamber as well as instrumental solo works, particularly for organ and period instruments.

== Awards ==
Kortekangas has received a number of awards and recognitions, among them the Salzburg Opera Prize, the Special Prize of the Prix Italia Competition, and the prestigious Teosto Prize.
