= American Choral Directors Association =

Non-profit organization

The American Choral Directors Association (ACDA), headquartered in Oklahoma City, Oklahoma, is a non-profit organization with the stated purpose of promoting the field of choral music. Its membership comprises approximately 22,000 choral directors representing over a million singers.

ACDA is organized in six regions: Midwestern, Eastern, Northwestern, Southern, Southwestern, and Western. Every year, conferences with topics pertaining to choral conductors are held. In even numbered years, a region conference is held in each region, and in odd numbered years, a national conference takes place in a major U.S. city. In 2021, ACDA organized its first virtual national conference in response to the COVID-19 pandemic. In 2023, the organization returned to an in person conference, with Cincinnati serving as the host city. Each year, a different university hosts the yearly ACDA chapter.

Their official publications are the Choral Journal, as well as the research journal International Journal of Research in Choral Singing.

As of 2020, Robyn Hilger was serving as the organization's executive director.

== Brock Commission ==
Since 1991, the ACDA awards the "Raymond W. Brock Memorial Commission" to "a recognized composer to write a choral composition in an effort to perpetuate quality choral repertoire."

| Year | Composer | Title | Orchestration | Duration | Notes |
|---|---|---|---|---|---|
| 1991 | Theron Kirk | O For A Thousand Tongues | | | |
| 1993 | Carlisle Floyd | A Time to Dance | | | |
| 1994 | Daniel E. Gawthrop | Sing a Mighty Song | | | |
| 1995 | Daniel Pinkham | Alleluia for the Waters | | | |
| 1996 | James Mulholland | That I Shall Never Look Upon Thee More | | | |
| 1997 | Stephen Paulus | God Be With Us | | | |
| 1997 | Gian Carlo Menotti | Jacob’s Prayer | | | |
| 1998 | Samuel Adler | A Psalm Trilogy | | | |
| 1999 | Gwyneth Walker | I Thank You God | | | |
| 1999 | Adolphus Hailstork | The God of Glory Thunders | | | |
| 2000 | David Brunner | The Circles of Our Lives | | | |
| 2001 | Eric Whitacre | Leonardo Dreams of His Flying Machine | | 10 min | |
| 2002 | Richard Nance | Psalm 36 | | | |
| 2003 | René Clausen | Memorial | | | |
| 2004 | Z. Randall Stroope | We Behold Once Again the Stars | | | |
| 2005 | Morten Lauridsen | Nocturnes | | | |
| 2006 | Mack Wilberg | Dances to Life | | | |
| 2007 | David Conte | The Nine Muses | | | |
| 2008 | Eleanor Joanne Daley | Life's Mirror | | | |
| 2009 | Dominick Argento | Cenotaph | | | |
| 2010 | Joan Szymko | All Works of Love | | | |
| 2011 | Steven Sametz | Three Mystical Choruses | | | |
| 2012 | Chen Yi | Distance can’t keep us two apart | A capella mixed choir | 5 min | Text by Wang Bo |
| 2013 | Steven Stucky | Take Him, Earth | SATB choir and 9 instruments | 13 min | |
| 2014 | Alice Parker | The Definition of Beauty | SSAA, unaccompanied | 4:45 min | |
| 2015 | Jake Heggie | Stop this Day and Night with Me | SATBBB, unaccompanied | | |
| 2016 | Ola Gjeilo | The River | choir, piano and string quartet | | |
| 2017 | J.A.C. Redford | Homing | Mixed chorus and orchestra | 28 min | |
| 2018 | Tarik O'Regan | All Things Common | Acapella SATB | 5 min | |
| 2019 | Jake Runestad | A Silence Haunts Me | SATB choir and piano | 11:30 min | Text by Todd Boss |
| 2020 | Ivo Antognini | There is that in me | | | |
| 2021 | Bob Chilcott | Songs My Heart Has Taught Me | | | |
| 2022 | Ēriks Ešenvalds | Stopping by Woods on a Snowy Evening | | | |
| 2023 | Jennifer Higdon | The Absence | | | |
| 2024 | Andre J Thomas | In Time of Silver Rain | | | |

== See also ==
- John B. Haberlen, a past national President of the Association
