= The Washington Chorus =

Choir in Washington, D.C., U.S.

- Choir
- Logo
- Former name: Oratorio Society of Washington
- Founded: 1961
- Members: 180
- Music director: Eugene Rogers (2020–present)
- Headquarters: 945 G Street, NW; Washington, D.C. 20008, effective October 1, 2021
- Website: thewashingtonchorus.org

The Washington Chorus is a symphonic choir based in Washington, D.C., United States. The three-time nominated and two-time Grammy Award-winning ensemble has over 200 members and often performs at the John F. Kennedy Center for the Performing Arts, Strathmore, the Wolf Trap National Park for the Performing Arts, and the Joseph Meyerhoff Symphony Hall.

== History ==
The Washington Chorus was the first major Washington area chorus to be founded independent of a church or college. In 1961 Hugh Hayward, a medical doctor and classically trained musician, founded the Oratorio Society of Montgomery County, which became known as the Oratorio Society of Washington, and is now celebrated under the name of The Washington Chorus. The organization has a $2.4 million budget, as of 2025.

== Artistic leadership ==
The Washington Chorus has had five artistic directors. Founding director Hugh Hayward was followed by Robert Shafer, who served for more than three decades. Subsequent directors included Julian Wachner (2008–2017), Christopher Bell (2017–2020), and Eugene Rogers, who became the choir's first Black artistic director in 2020, as well as the first Black artistic director of a major symphonic chorus in the entire United States.

== Notable performances ==
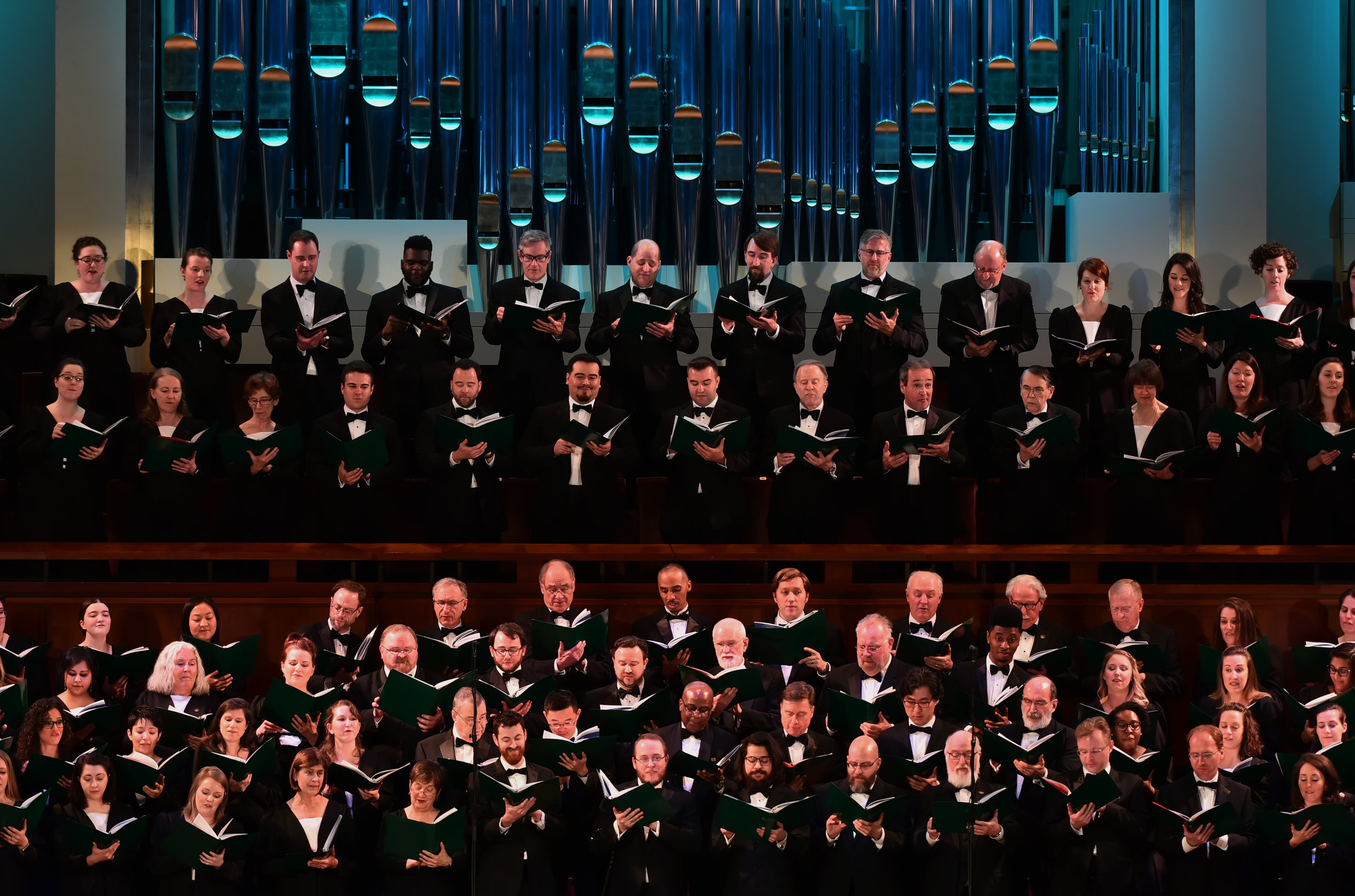
St. Patrick's Day Celebration at the John F. Kennedy Center for the Performing Arts

The Washington Chorus has appeared at the invitation of leading orchestras including the National Symphony Orchestra and the Baltimore Symphony Orchestra. The Chorus has sung with the National Symphony in more than 300 performances, under the direction of many of the world's leading conductors, including Gianandrea Noseda, Christoph Eschenbach, Leonard Slatkin, James Conlon, Mstislav Rostropovich, Rafael Frühbeck de Burgos, Seiji Ozawa, Sir Neville Marriner, Kent Nagano, Marin Alsop, Gustavo Dudamel, Sir Andrew Davis, and many others.

The Chorus has sung for numerous prestigious events throughout its history: inaugurations, papal visits, with the Rolling Stones during their 50th anniversary tour, and at the White House in 2013 and 2014 for the President and First Lady.

The Chorus was a featured performing group at the 2018 Kennedy Center Honors to pay homage to composer Philip Glass and a guest collaborator on “DJ Cassidy’s Pass the Mic” segment broadcast on the 2021 Biden-Harris Inauguration “Parade Across America”.

== Projects through COVID-19 pandemic ==
Although 20+ in-person concerts and special appearances were forced to be cancelled due to the COVID-19 pandemic, The Washington Chorus remained active with special virtual programming, including the annual Candlelight Christmas concert.

On November 14, 2020, the Chorus premiered “Cantata for a More Hopeful Tomorrow,” a work for virtual chorus composed by Damien Geter and set to a 25-minute short film directed by filmmaker Bob Berg. The film tells a covid-era love story centered on an elderly Black couple separated by the virus, and the music is modeled after Bach's redemptive “Weinen, Klagen, Sorgen, Zagen” cantata (BWV 12). Nearly 40 Chorus members appear through green-screen and more than 100 lent their voices to the recording.

The Chorus also launched the Cause For Song marketplace, a digital music platform which specializes in custom, musical dedication videos for any occasion. The platform featured Chorus singers, staff, as well as guest artists including Nicholas Phan, Metropolitan Opera soprano Aundi Marie Moore and Sister Cities Girlchoir.

== See also ==
- Choral music of Washington, D.C.
