= Richard Wayne Dirksen =

American musician and composer

- Dirksen conducting the choir at the Washington National Cathedral in the 1980s
- Born: 1921; Freeport, Illinois, U.S.
- Died: July 26, 2003 (aged 81–82); Washington, D.C., U.S.
- Occupations: Organist, composer, conductor
- Spouse: Joan Milton Shaw
- Children: Richard, Geoffrey, Laura, and Mark
- Parent(s): Richard Watson Dirksen and Maude Logemann

Richard Wayne Dirksen (February 8, 1921 - July 26, 2003) was an American musician and composer, who served as organist and choirmaster of the Washington National Cathedral in Washington, D.C., from 1977 to 1988. Previously he was assistant organist and choirmaster from 1942 to 1964. In 1969, Dirksen was named the cathedral's precentor, giving him administrative oversight of all worship services until his retirement in 1991.

Dirksen composed extensively, mostly choral and organ works, and his music continues to be regularly featured on broadcasts from the Cathedral. His 1974 opus, Vineyard Haven, has been called "widely acclaimed as one of the finest hymn tunes of our day", by editors of hymnology.

== Early years and education ==
Dirksen was born in Freeport, Illinois, the eldest son of Richard Watson Dirksen and Maude Logemann. In high school, he played the bassoon and was a drum major. Awarded a scholarship, he then studied organ at Baltimore's Peabody Conservatory under Virgil Fox, graduating magna cum laude in June, 1942.

== Career at the Cathedral ==
While still studying at Peabody, Dirksen became assistant organist to Paul Callaway at the Washington National Cathedral in February, 1942. Later that year, he began three-and-a-half years of military service during World War II, resuming his post at the cathedral in December, 1945. In 1949, Dirksen was also appointed director of the glee club at the cathedral's affiliated St. Albans School. In 1969, he was the first lay person in the Anglican Communion to be named a Precentor, meaning he had administrative oversight of all worship services.

During his long tenure at the cathedral, he produced ceremonial music and pageants for various occasions, such as the U.S. Bicentennial in 1976 and the consecration of the completed cathedral in 1990, attended by U.S. President George H. W. Bush and other dignitaries. Dirksen was succeeded by Douglas Major as Cathedral Organist and Choirmaster in 1988 and retired as Precentor in 1991.

== Compositions ==
Dirksen was also a composer of almost 300 works, mostly for organ and/or choir or theater. His music has been regularly featured on Christmas at Washington National Cathedral, televised nationally on Christmas Day, as well as the September 11 Memorial Service held at the Washington National Cathedral on September 14, 2001, which was attended by all living presidents but one and viewed on television by much of the world.

His most well-known compositions include:

- A Child My Choice
- American Adventure (orchestral score)
- Chanticleer
- Christ Our Passover
- God is our hope
- Jonah
- O be joyful in the Lord (Jubilate Deo)
- Vineyard Haven (the hymn tune for "Rejoice ye pure in heart" and other settings)
- Welcome All Wonders

== Personal life ==
He married Joan Milton Shaw in 1942 and the couple had four children: Richard, Geoffrey, Laura, and Mark.

At the time of his death in Washington, D.C., on July 26, 2003, he was also survived by a sister, Phyllis, and a brother, Gerriet, along with seven grandchildren.

== Awards and honors ==
Dirksen was awarded an honorary doctor of fine arts degree in 1980 by George Washington University, an honorary doctor of music by Marymount College in 1986, and the Medal of Excellence by the Shenandoah Conservatory of Music.

In 2006, the Cathedral Choral Society at Washington National Cathedral announced the establishment of an endowment fund in his memory to commission new Christmas choral music.

== Sources ==
- Kimberling, Clark. "The Hymn Tunes of Richard Wayne Dirksen", The Hymn, v. 53 no. 4 (October 2002) pp. 19–28.
