= Fairfax Symphony Orchestra =

Orchestra in Virginia, United States

The Fairfax Symphony Orchestra is a regional orchestra based in Fairfax, Virginia, founded in 1957.

Currently, the Fairfax Symphony plays at the George Mason University Center for the Arts Concert Hall as well as Capital One Hall. Notable members from past and present include Maestro Christopher Zimmerman, music director since 2009; Maestro William Hudson, music director from 1972 to 2009; Daniel E. Gawthrop who was for three years the FSO's composer-in-residence; and Gregory Rupert, the FSO's principal violist, noted as one of the top viola performers in the United States.

== Mission ==
The mission of the Fairfax Symphony Orchestra is:

"To explore and present the symphonic repertoire, both traditional and modern, for the diverse audiences of the Northern Virginia region while building the musicians and audiences of the future through education and outreach programs throughout Fairfax County."
