= City Choir of Washington =

Choir in Washington, D.C., United States

The City Choir of Washington
- Also known as: TCCW, City Choir
- Origin: Washington, D.C., United States
- Genres: Classical, Choral
- Occupation: Choir
- Years active: 2006-present
- Members: Artistic Director; Erin Freeman (conductor)
- Website: Official website

The City Choir of Washington is a 140-member professional-level volunteer mixed symphonic choir in Washington, D.C. composed of singers from throughout the Washington metropolitan area. The chorus is led by its artistic director Erin Freeman. Ms. Freeman joins the City Choir following a two year search after the announcement in 2019 by Bob Shafer of his plan to retire. She was formerly the Artistic Director of the Richmond Symphony Chorus and continues as the Artistic Director of the Wintergreen Music Festival. Bob Shafer has been named Artistic Director Emeritus of the City Choir of Washington.

The City Choir has performed with the National Symphony Orchestra, The Washington National Opera at the John F. Kennedy Center for the Performing Arts, and at Wolf Trap National Park for the Performing Arts.

== Activities ==
During its first four seasons, the chorus presented several major works with orchestra, including the Monteverdi Marian Vespers of 1610, Bach’s Mass in B Minor, Handel’s Dixit Dominus, Haydn’s Lord Nelson Mass and Mass in Time of War, Maurice Duruflé's Requiem, the Mozart Requiem, the Vivaldi Gloria, Robert Shafer's Lux Aeterna and Joel Puckett’s This Mourning.

TCCW's Excellence in the Arts award honors contributions to the arts in the greater Washington, DC area.

=== Community outreach and education ===
In February 2011, local businesses and chorus members sponsored tickets for Pentagon families affected by 9/11 and high school and college students as part of the organization's community outreach efforts. TCCW's artistic director and executive director often invite college-age music education students to attend rehearsals and participate in question and answer sessions following events.

==== Programs ====
- City Singers — TCCW's community outreach chamber choir that regularly performs for underserved segments of the community. The ensemble brings quality choral music — light classical, popular, secular, patriotic, show tunes, folk songs — to organizations and audiences who may not be able to attend its regular concerts.
- Partners in Song — a talented high school choral group joins TCCW for its annual Music for Christmas concert. The group performs several selections on its own and also joins the City Choir for part of the program.
- Young American Artists Program — one or more emerging performers from the Washington metropolitan area are selected to be featured soloists in one of TCCW's concerts. The vocalists are selected through a comprehensive audition process for young singers from throughout the region. Each Young American Artist receives private coaching from Robert Shafer.
