= World Children's Choir =

The World Children's Choir (WCC) is a 501(c)(3) non-profit organization. The Choir was founded by Sondra Harnes in March 1990 who is also the Choir's Artistic Director and Chief Executive Officer.

The choir headquarters is in Falls Church, Virginia, and it serves the Northern Virginia area of Washington, DC. The choir provides opportunities to perform choral music to a culturally diverse membership of children from ages 4 to 18. The choir provides scholarships to economically disadvantaged children in the area in order to provide them with a broad musical appreciation that might not otherwise be available. The choir has performed at venues ranging from Carnegie Hall to the White House.
