= Daddy's Girl (opera) =

Daddy's Girl is an opera by composer Olli Kortekangas and librettist Michael Baran. It was commissioned by the Savonlinna Opera Festival and the Finnish Parliament, and premiered in Savonlinna in 2007. A new production of the work was staged at the Finnish National Opera in 2009.

== Sources ==
- MusicWeb International (January 2009). Interview: Olli Kortekangas
- Tiikkaja, Samuli (February 2007). "Olli Kortekangas composes a celebratory opera Ordinary people and big emotions". Finnish Music Quarterly
