= Qingdao Symphony Orchestra =

The Qingdao Symphony Orchestra (Chinese: 青岛交响乐团; pinyin: Qingdao Jiāoxiǎng Yuètuán; commonly abbreviated QSO) is an orchestra re-established in April 2005.

The orchestra's artistic directors and principal conductors are Zhang Guoyong (张国勇) and Zhu Hui (朱晖), and its concertmaster and deputy executive director is Liu Yuxia (刘玉霞). The executive director is Lian Xinguo (连新国).

The principal performance venue of QSO is at the People's Hall of Qingdao. QSO has been touring around performing at major cities within the country. QSO also regularly obtains invitations from abroad to perform at prestigious venues such as the John F. Kennedy Center, Carnegie Hall, Kean University in New Jersey, Yale University in Connecticut, and Harvard University in Massachusetts during their American tour. The performances of QSO have received excellent acclaims.
