= Thomas Circle Singers =

Thomas Circle Singers (TCS) is an independent chamber chorus located in Washington, D.C. It donates concert ticket proceeds to nonprofit organizations. TCS has raised over $200,000 for various Washington D.C.–based charitable causes, including Thrive DC, the Wendt Center for Loss and Healing, Calvary Women's Services, Art Enables, Freeminds Book Club, and Project Create.

The group was founded in 1976 with the support of Luther Place Memorial Church, and is currently located at National City Christian Church on Thomas Circle in Washington, D.C. TCS was named Washingtonian of the Year 2000 by Washingtonian Magazine and former artistic director, James Kreger, was honored in 2001 with WETA-FM’s Hometown Hero award.

Mission Statement

Established in 1976, The Thomas Circle Singers (TCS) is a welcoming and inclusive choral ensemble committed to enriching the musical life of the Washington, D.C. region through engaging and impactful performances, and partnerships with D.C.-based social service organizations.
