= St. Alban's Episcopal Church (Washington, D.C.) =

Coordinates: 38.9276°N 77.0710°W

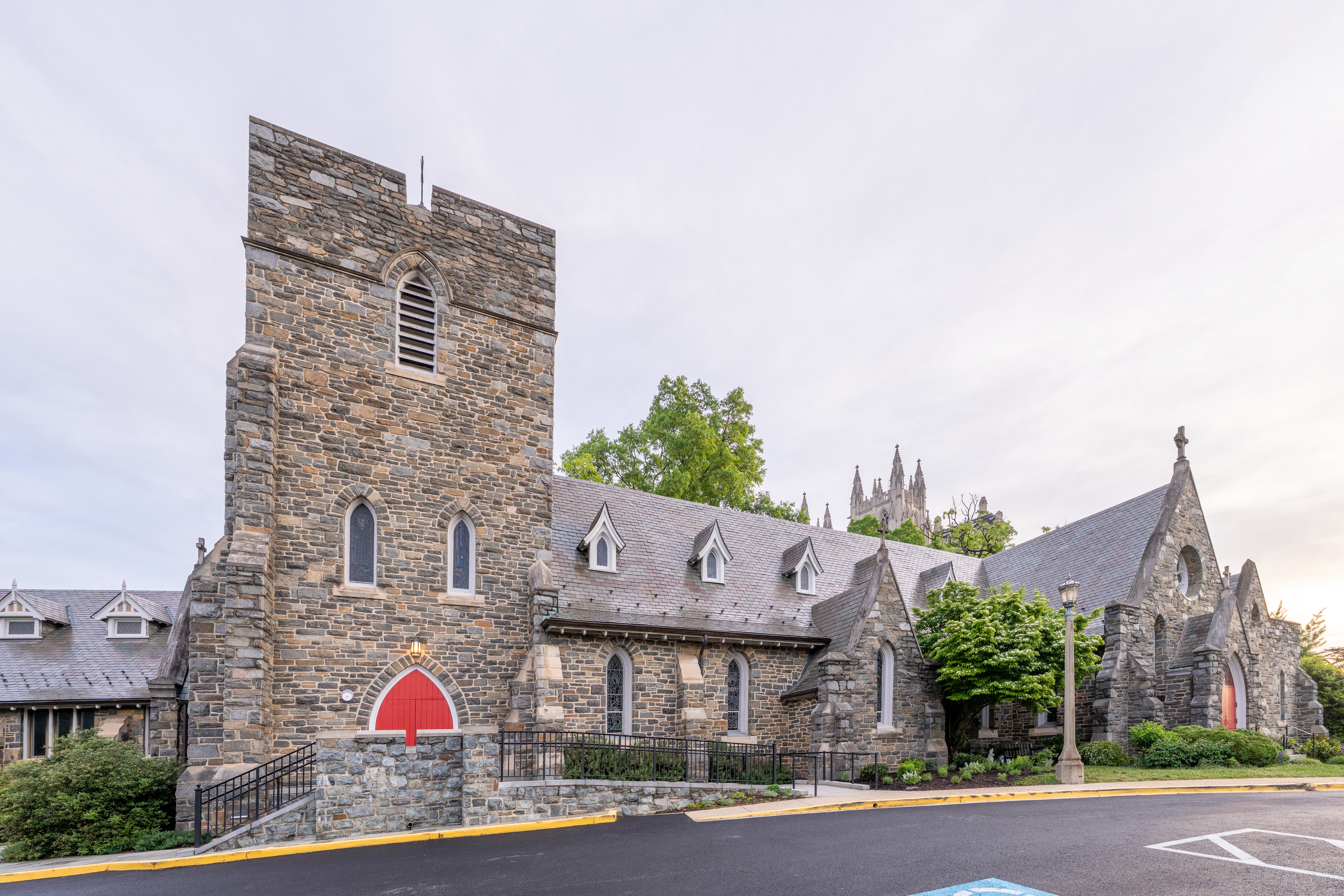
St. Alban's Church

St. Alban's Episcopal Church is a parish of the Episcopal Diocese of Washington located in Washington, D.C., United States. Established in 1854, it is situated on the grounds of the Washington National Cathedral, commonly referred to as the Cathedral Close. The church is known for its rich history, inclusive worship, and its mission-driven approach to community and education. The church reported 1,940 members in 2015 and 849 members in 2023; no membership statistics were reported in 2024 parochial reports. Plate and pledge income reported for the congregation in 2024 was $1,519,770. Average Sunday attendance (ASA) in 2024 was 278 persons.

== History ==
St. Alban's was originally founded as a "free church"—one open to all and not dependent upon rented pews—in 1854. The church was named for St. Alban, regarded as the first British Christian martyr. From its inception, St. Alban's maintained a mission-minded philosophy, leading to the establishment of five mission churches across Washington, D.C. The parish also sponsored missionaries in Asia, Alaska, and other regions.

The church was founded on land once owned by the Nourse family, notably Joseph Nourse, the first Register of the United States Treasury. Joseph Nourse's estate, which he called Mount Alban, later became the site of St. Alban's Church. The formal founding of the church is tied to Phoebe Nourse, the devout daughter of Charles Nourse, who left $40 in gold (equivalent to approximately $4,000 today) to Rev. Ten Broeck with instructions to build a church on the site. Her bequest, supplemented by local donors and proceeds from her botanical watercolors, allowed for the construction of a wooden church designed by architect Frank Wills. Ground was broken in 1851, and the building became a center of Episcopal worship in the area. In the late 19th century St. Alban's was instrumental in the foundation of the National Cathedral with which it now shares its grounds.

By the early 20th century, St. Alban's had become a dynamic spiritual hub in the capital. It played a foundational role in establishing other Episcopal congregations, including:

- St. Columba's (1875)
- St. George's (1875)
- St. David's (1901)
- All Souls' (1911)
- St. Patrick's (1911)

=== Rectors ===
The following is a list of the rectors who have led the parish since its founding.

- The Rev. Wentworth L. Childs: Served as the first rector of the parish.
- The Rev. John Hamilton Chew: Served as rector during the Civil War era. A rectory was built for him and his family.
- The Rev. Philip M. Rhinelander: Served for about one year, in 1896, as minister in charge while he was a deacon. He was later transferred to cathedral work and became the Bishop of Pennsylvania.
- The Rev. George Bratenahl: Called as rector in 1896 serving until 1912. He oversaw several improvements to the church early in his rectorate.
- The Rev. Charles T. Warner: Installed in 1912 and served until 1948. He had the longest tenure of any rector in the parish's history.
- The Rev. Dr. E. Felix Kloman: Served as rector from 1949 to 1952 then he served as Dean of Virginia Theological Seminary.
- The Rev. Robert Trenbath: Served as rector from 1952 to 1956, while Dr. Kloman was at Virginia Theological Seminary. He died suddenly.
- The Rev. Dr. E. Felix Kloman: recalled to serve as rector 1956–1969.
- The Rev. Robert Estill: Called as rector 1969–1973.
- The Rev. A. Theodore Eastman: Served as rector from 1973 to 1982, when he was elected Bishop Coadjutor of the Diocese of Maryland.
- The Rev. Dr. Francis H. Wade: Called as rector in 1983, retiring in 2005.
- The Rev. Carlyle Gill: Served as Interim Rector from 2005 to 2006.
- The Rev. Dr. Scott A. Benhase: Served as Rector from 2006 to 2009. He was later elected bishop of Georgia.
- The Rev. Canon John Lawrence: Served as Interim Rector in 2010.
- The Rev. Dr. Deborah Meister: Called as rector in 2011 and resigned in 2016.
- The Rev. Bertie Pearson: Became rector in 2016.

== Mission and Community Life ==
St. Alban's is also well known for many of its active outreach programs which serve hundreds in the Washington, D.C. metro area daily. The church frequently hosts lectures and discussions with prominent theologians and scholars, including Rowan Williams, Sarah Coakley, James Alison, and Amy-Jill Levine.

The church's location on the National Cathedral Close—one of the most prominent religious precincts in the United States—adds to its visibility and influence within the Episcopal Church. Despite occupying just over an acre of land, St. Alban's has a large regional reach and many of its rectors have gone on to serve as prominent bishops in the Episcopal Church.

== Architecture and Grounds ==
St. Alban's is a well preserved example of the 19th century Ecclesiological Movement, being designed by the official architect of the New York Ecclesiology Society, Frank Wills.

== See also ==
- Washington National Cathedral
- Episcopal Diocese of Washington
- Ecclesiological Movement
- Frank Wills
