= Maryland State Boychoir =

American boys' choir based in Baltimore, Maryland, US

The Maryland State Boychoir
- Choir
- Maryland State Boychoir logo
- Founded: 1987; 39 years ago Baltimore, Maryland, U.S.
- Founder: Frank Cimino
- Members: approx. 150
- Leadership: Artistic Director & President; Stephen Holmes; Founder; Frank Cimino; Assistant Director; Joseph Shortall
- Headquarters: Baltimore, Maryland, U.S.
- Website: www.marylandstateboychoir.org

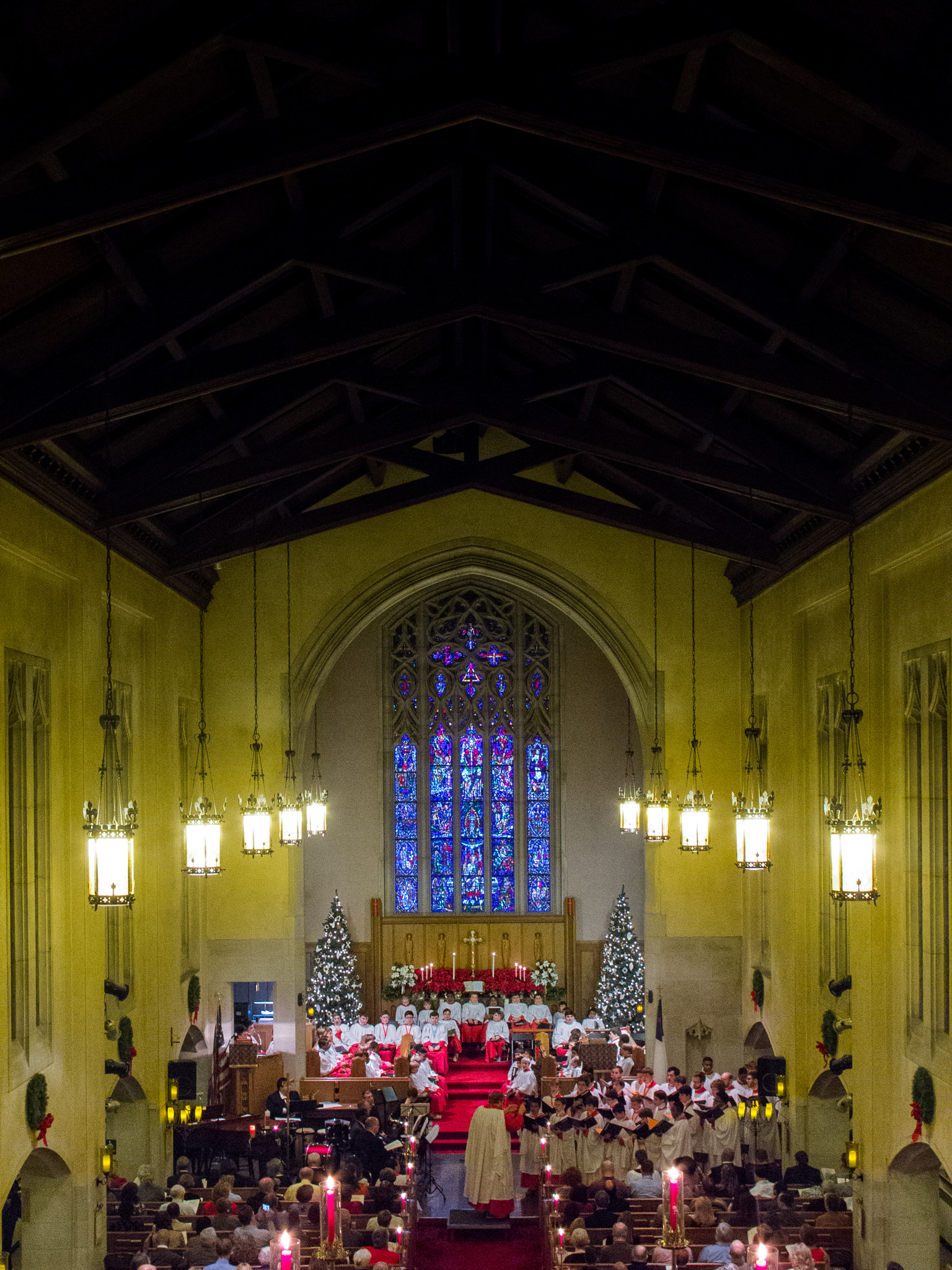
The Maryland State Boychoir sings during a lessons and carols service.

The Maryland State Boychoir is an internationally touring American boys' choir based in Baltimore, Maryland. It was founded in 1987 by Frank Cimino, and was designated by Maryland Governor William Donald Schaefer as "Maryland's Official Goodwill Ambassadors". The choir is a donor-supported 501(c)3 organization that provides talented boys an opportunity to sing at a professional level while developing their self-esteem, self-discipline, and character.

== History ==
The Maryland State Boychoir was founded in 1987 by Frank Cimino, to foster the Boychoir tradition by offering talented boys opportunities to sing and build self-esteem, self-discipline, and character. Cimino began his involvement with the Boychoir tradition at an early age, joining as a charter member of The Cathedral of Mary Our Queen's Choir of Men and Boys in Baltimore, Maryland. His musical training was nurtured during his formative years and he earned a Bachelors of Music from The Johns Hopkins Peabody Conservatory of Music. Inspired by the "Boychoir tradition", Mr. Cimino drew on influences such as The King's College Choir.

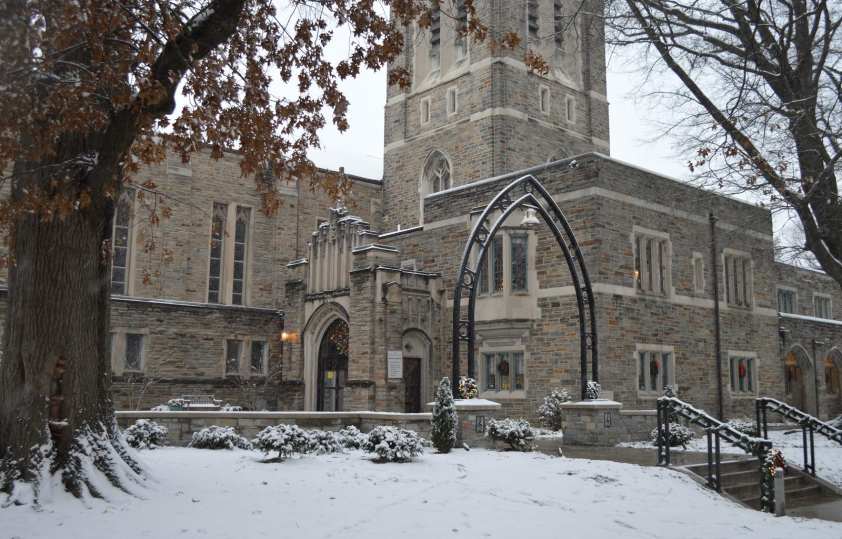
The Maryland State Boychoir Center for the Arts in Winter

Founded with only 14 choristers, the choir was run out of an office in his mother's basement for 12 years, the program has since expanded to over 150 choristers ages 7 to 20, who come from a wide range of ethnic, socioeconomic, and religious backgrounds; and includes its own center for the arts. The Maryland State Boychoir Center for the Arts (CFA) was established in 2006 and serves as a permanent rehearsal space for the choir. Located in Baltimore's historic Mayfield community, the former church was designed by architects Buckler and Fenhagen and is a superb example of English Gothic Revival. Constructed in 1929, the church served as the home for St. Matthew United Church of Christ. The choir currently offers space for other arts and nonprofit organizations.

The Maryland State Boychoir founded the annual Baltimore Boychoir Festival in 1998. The Festival invites Boychoirs from around the United States and Canada to participate in a weekend of singing under the direction of some of the greatest guest directors in the world. Among the choirs that have participated in this festival are the American Boychoir School, the Newark Boys Chorus, and the Georgia Boy Choir.

The choir holds 7 CD recordings, collaborating with various artists and composers. Performing with various ensembles such as the National Symphony Orchestra. They have been featured on NBC's “Homicide: Life on the Street,” National Public Radio's “All Things Considered,” on Maryland Public Television, National Family Radio, and WBJC.

During the COVID-19 pandemic, the choir briefly suspended all in-person rehearsals. The choir has now reinstated rehearsals and regularly meets at the Center for the Arts.

== Tours ==
In the summer of 2001, the choir made its first international debut touring Europe and performing at various prestigious venues such as St. Peter's Basilica in Vatican City for Pope John Paul II. The choir has continued to tour extensively, locally, nationally, and internationally. The choir has toured many countries in Europe and the Americas. In 2004 and 2017, the choir toured Ireland where they served as choir in residence for Saint Patrick's Cathedral. They have also been invited to perform at The White House, the Kennedy Center, the National Cathedral in Washington, D.C., St. Patrick's and Holy Trinity Cathedrals in New York, Coventry Cathedral in England, and in the Stern Auditorium at Carnegie Hall.

== Structure ==
The choir is divided into the following groupings, based on musical knowledge, voice part, and skill.

Resident Training Choir The Resident Training Choir contains the newest and typically youngest members, learning the basics of reading music and music theory.

Treble Choir The Treble Choir consists of younger boys who are relatively new to singing in an organized setting.

Tour Choir The Tour Choir is composed of advanced singers of all ages, focusing on traditional chamber church music. They travel across the world to perform on three annual tours.

Concert Choir The Concert Choir is the intermediate group, composed of all ages, which also tours extensively.

Young Men's Chorus This choir group consists of older boys with changed voices, drawing from both the Concert and Tour Choirs.

== Funding ==
The Maryland State Boychoir is primarily supported by private donors, including individuals, businesses, and foundations.

== Annual events ==
The Choir performs at various venues throughout the year but has 9 main events they perform every year.

Winter Camp The choir holds an annual winter camp over a long weekend to introduce the component choirs to the spring repertoire.

Spring and Fall Tours The Concert Choir, Tour Choir, and Young Men Chorus embark on short tours in the spring and fall. They typically sing at churches, schools, and retirement communities.

Festival of Nine Lessons and Carols Held in the days leading up to Christmas...

Summer Camp All of the component choirs attend a week-long summer camp on a college campus, which fosters group unity and builds the musical repertoire.

Summer Tour The Concert Choir and Tour Choir embark on separate extended tours in July and August. The destinations range from cross-country to across the globe.

African American Celebration All of the component choirs participate in an annual celebration of the African-American tradition, singing gospel songs and African based songs.

Spring Concert The Spring Concert is the culmination of the spring schedule, and it is held at the Maryland State Boychoir Center for the Arts.

Day of Goodwill The Concert and Treble Choirs in January visit and sing at nursing homes and schools, held usually on a Friday.

Baltimore Boychoir Festival A two-day event, led by some of the country's finest composers and clinicians, culminating in a group performance of many Boychoirs from across America.

== Discography ==
- Comfort & Joy (2021)
- Bernstein: Symphony No. 3 "Kaddish" (2015)
- The Maryland State Boychoir ACDA National Conference (2015)
- The Maryland State Boychoir ACDA Baltimore (2014)
- The Healing Power of Music (2013)
- A Crown of Stars/Requiem (2012)
- Brothers (2006)
- Remember Me (2001)
- What Sweeter Music (1998)
- Live in Performance (1997)
- An Die Musik (1994)
