= Cathedral Choral Society =

Choral society in Washington, D.C.

The Cathedral Choral Society is a 200-voice symphonic, volunteer chorus based at the Washington National Cathedral. The late J. Reilly Lewis was music director from 1985 to 2016. He succeeded Paul Callaway, who founded the group in 1941. The ensemble performs primarily at the Washington National Cathedral, and also appears regularly at such venues as the Kennedy Center and Wolf Trap.

In 2006, the Society announced the establishment of an endowment fund in memory of Richard Wayne Dirksen, who served the society in wide-ranging capacities during his half-century tenure at the Cathedral. The endowment will commission new carols and help support the ensemble's annual Joy of Christmas concerts.
