= J. Reilly Lewis =

American conductor (1944–2016)

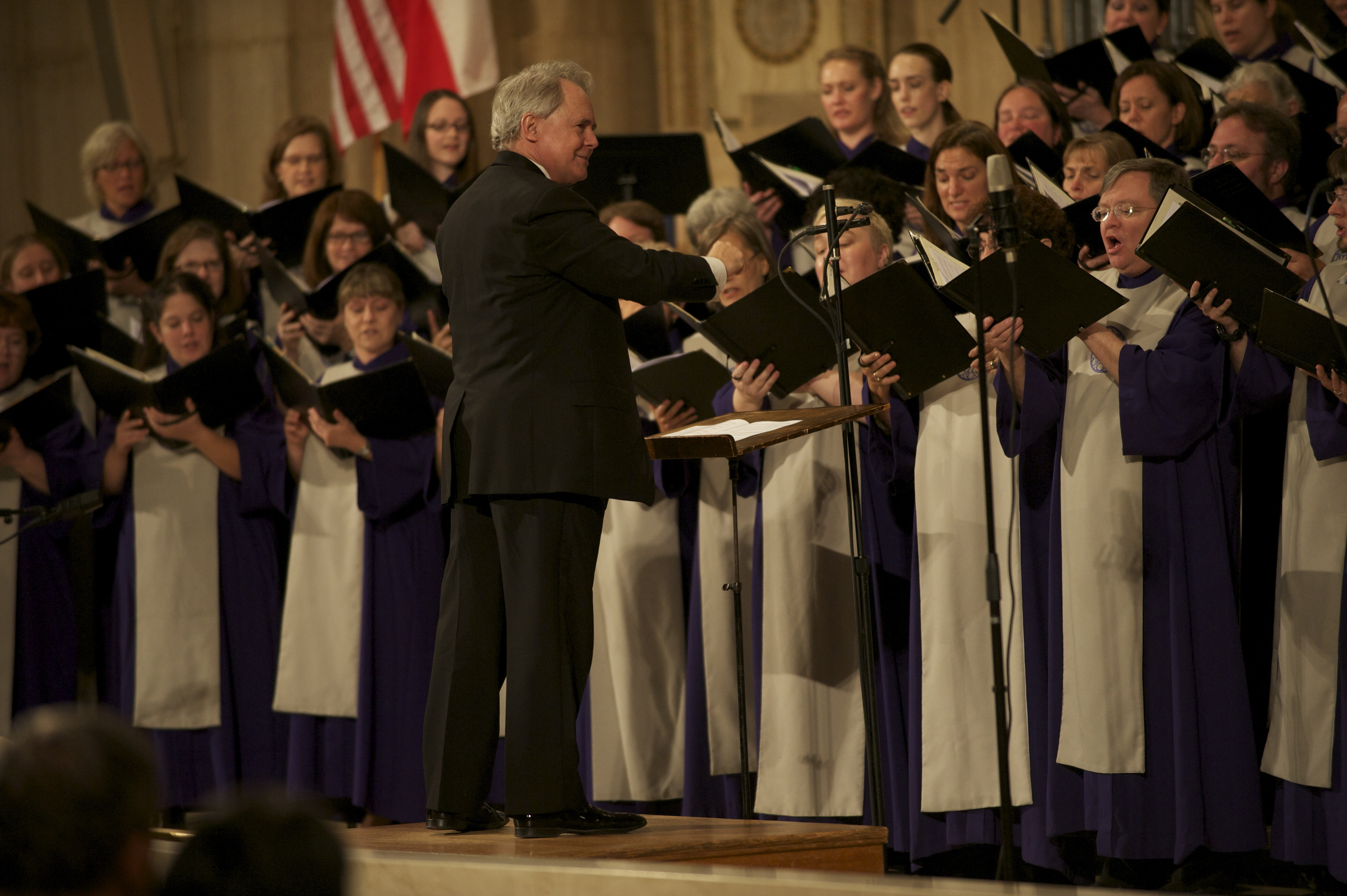
- J. Reilly Lewis conducting the Cathedral Choral Society in 2013.
- Born: 15 September 1944
- Died: 9 June 2016
- Education: Juilliard School
- Occupations: Conductor, organist
- Organization(s): Washington Bach Consort, Cathedral Choral Society

John Reilly Lewis (September 15, 1944 – June 9, 2016) was an American choral conductor who founded the Washington Bach Consort and was the music director of the Cathedral Choral Society. As a keyboard artist he specialised in baroque music, particularly the music of J. S. Bach.

== Education and career ==
Born in 1944 in Vallejo, California, he received a bachelor's degree from the Oberlin College Conservatory of Music and a master's and doctorate from The Juilliard School. A Fulbright Fellowship enabled him to spend a year at the Hochschule für Musik in Frankfurt am Main, where he studied conducting, organ and harpsichord. Several years later, he spent a summer in France studying composition with Nadia Boulanger.

== Career ==
From 1971 until his death, Lewis was organist and choirmaster at Clarendon United Methodist Church in Arlington, Virginia, where he led the adult choir, as well as choral and instrumental programs for youth. He led semiannual singalong presentations of Handel's Messiah (Handel) during Advent and Easter seasons, featuring guest soloists accompanied by full orchestra. This was the first and the longest-running series of performances of Messiah presenting the complete oratorio in the Washington, D.C. area.

In November 2005, he performed Samuel Barber's Toccata Festiva for the second time in the Washington National Cathedral with Leonard Slatkin conducting. He also performed the complete Bach Goldberg Variations in recital on multiple occasions and was a featured organ soloist with the National Symphony Orchestra.

Lewis's performing and conducting career included appearances with the Minnesota Orchestra, the New York Philharmonic, the Handel Festival, Halle, the Bachfest Leipzig, the Aspen Music Festival, the Cologne New Music Festival and the Mozart Festival in New York and Washington. During a Chinese/American Festival in Taipei's main concert hall, he played the organ and later conducted the orchestra and chorus in 20th century works, including a world premiere by the Chinese composer Gordon Shi-Wen Chin. He made his National Symphony Orchestra debut in December 2002, guest conducting Handel's Messiah at the John F. Kennedy Center for the Performing Arts.

== Honors and awards ==
Lewis received the Paul Hume Award from the Levine School of Music, for "outstanding commitment to enriching the cultural life of Washington". His work with children and youth includes the education and outreach programs of both the Cathedral Choral Society and the Washington Bach Consort. In April 2004, he received the Distinguished Washingtonian Award from the University Club of Washington, DC in honor of its centennial. In January 2006, Washingtonian magazine named Lewis as a 2005 "Washingtonian of the Year". In 2010, Lewis was inducted in Washington, D.C. as a National Patron of Delta Omicron, an international, professional music fraternity.

== Death ==
Lewis died of a heart attack on June 9, 2016, at his home in Arlington, Virginia. He is survived by his wife, Beth Lewis; daughter Lauren Currie Lewis; and grandson Ocea Currie.
