= Paul Callaway =

American organist and choral conductor (1909–1995)

Paul Callaway OBE
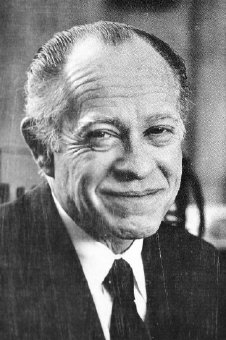
- Born: August 16, 1909; Atlanta, Illinois
- Died: March 21, 1995 (aged 85); Washington, D.C.
- Occupations: Organist, Choirmaster, Composer, and Conductor

Paul Smith Callaway, OBE (August 16, 1909 – March 21, 1995) was a prominent American organist and choral conductor, particularly well known for his thirty-eight years at the Washington National Cathedral, Washington, D.C., between 1939–1977. A friend of Leonard Bernstein and Ned Rorem, he was also active in opera and a frequent guest conductor of the Lake George Opera Company (now Saratoga Opera) and was the founding musical director of the Opera Society of Washington in 1956, now the renowned Washington National Opera. By the time of his death in 1995, he was acclaimed for his great influence on the musical life of the nation's capital. In 1977, Callaway was appointed an Honorary Officer of The Order of the British Empire (OBE) and invested by Ambassador Peter Jay on behalf of Queen Elizabeth II.

== Early years and education ==
Born in Atlanta, Illinois, in 1909, Callaway attended Westminster College, Missouri, and subsequently studied organ with T. Tertius Noble (1930–1935), followed by studies with Leo Sowerby at the American Conservatory of Music in Chicago and then Marcel Dupré in Paris. While pursuing his advanced studies, Callaway was organist and choirmaster at St. Thomas Chapel in New York (1930–1935) and later St. Mark's Episcopal Church in Grand Rapids, Michigan (1935–1939).

== At Washington National Cathedral ==
On September 1, 1939, Callaway became organist and choirmaster at the Washington National Cathedral, where he founded the Cathedral Choral Society in 1941. During World War II, Callaway was drafted into the Army as a bandmaster in the South Pacific., returning in May 1946. During his tenure at the Cathedral, Callaway expanded the music program's support of American liturgical music and also oversaw considerable expansion of the organ in the 1950s–1970s as construction of the Cathedral's nave was completed. He was quite short in stature, necessitating the installation of a custom-made adjustable pedalboard operated hydraulically so that the diminutive organist could comfortably reach the pedals of the Washington Cathedral's organ.

== Notable appearances ==
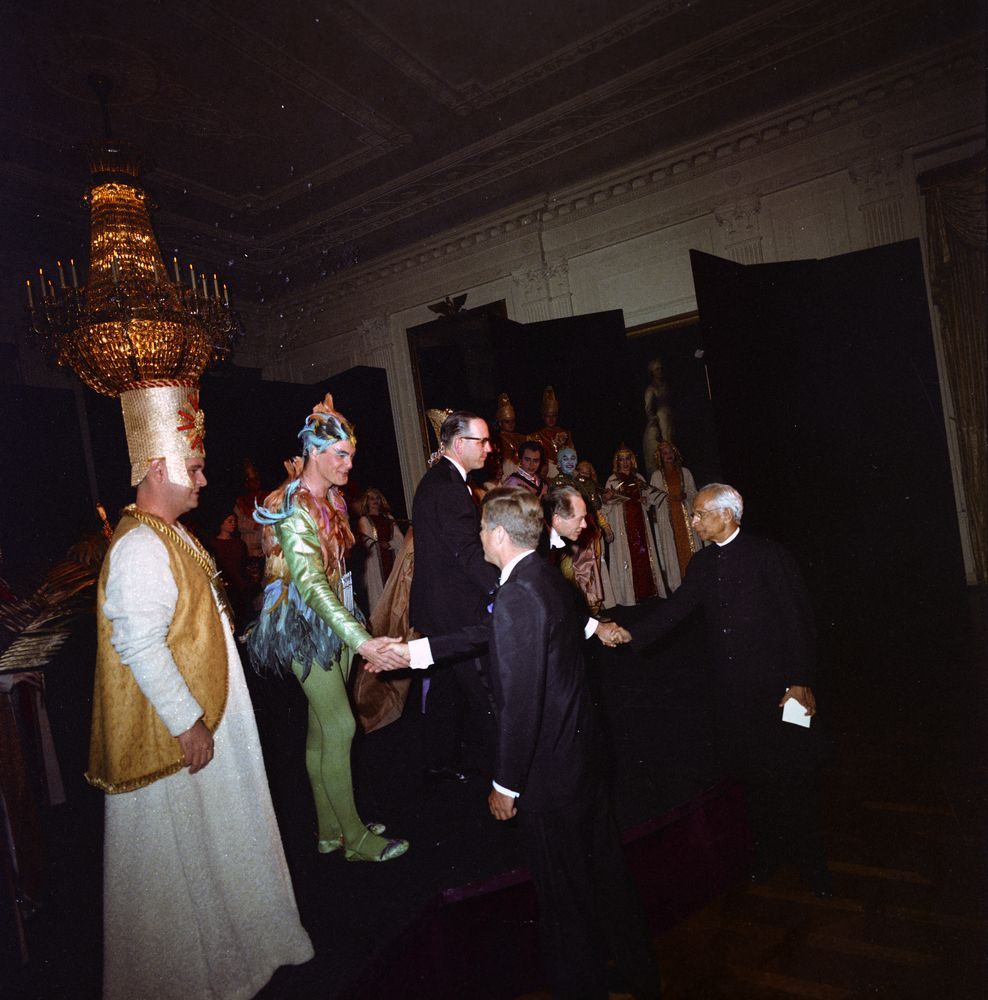
President John F. Kennedy and President Dr. Sarvepalli Radhakrishnan of India greet actors following a performance of Mozart’s “The Magic Flute” in the East Room of the White House. Callaway is shaking hands with President Radhakrishnan

In addition to his principal duties at the Cathedral, Callaway frequently served as a guest conductor at prominent venues. He was a guest conductor of Washington's National Symphony Orchestra and also conducted the world premiere of Gian Carlo Menotti's ballet, The Unicorn, the Gorgon, and the Manticore in 1956. At New York City's Riverside Church in December 1962, he conducted the world premiere of John La Montaine's religious opera Novellis Novellis about the Annunciation. Other La Montaine operas conducted by Callaway at their world premiers were The Shephardes Playe and Play of Herode. Callaway was the founding music director of the Washington National Opera in 1956. He played the solo organ part in the world premiere of Samuel Barber's Toccata Festiva in 1960 with the Philadelphia Orchestra, conducted by Eugene Ormandy.

On April 17, 1966, Callaway directed the 51-voice choir of the Washington National Cathedral at Westminster Abbey in London. It was the first time an American choral group had sung there and an American flag was raised outside the Abbey for the occasion.

== Works ==
Callaway's works include The Great Organ of Washington Cathedral, recorded in 1974, An hymne of heavenly love, composed in the late-1930s while at St. Mark's Episcopal Church in Grand Rapids., and "Hark! the Glad Sound!" composed in December 1944 for the Cathedral Choral Society.

== Retirement and death ==
Upon Callaway's retirement as the Cathedral's third organist and choirmaster in 1977, he was succeeded by assistant organist Richard Wayne Dirksen, the Canon Precentor. Washington Post music critic Paul Hume said of Callaway at the time, "It seems incontrovertible that he has had a larger influence on the musical life of this city than any other person". Callaway then served as organist and choirmaster at St. Paul’s Parish, K Street, in Washington. He was a member of the Church of the Ascension and Saint Agnes in Washington, where his requiem was held following his death from cancer on March 21, 1995. A memorial tuba rank was installed on the organ of the Church of the Ascension and Saint Agnes in his memory.
