= Choral Arts Society of Washington =

Symphonic chorus organization in Washington, D.C.

The Choral Arts Society of Washington
- Also known as: Choral Arts, CASW
- Origin: Washington, D.C., United States
- Genres: Classical, Choral, A cappella, Contemporary
- Occupation: Choir
- Years active: 1965–present
- Members: Marie Bucoy-Calavan, artistic director
- Past members: Jace Kaholokula Saplan (2022–2023), Scott Tucker (2012–2022), Norman Scribner, Founder (1965–2012)
- Website: Official website

The Choral Arts Society of Washington is a major choral organization based in Washington, D.C. Founded in 1965 by Norman Scribner, it is regarded as one of the premier symphonic choruses in the United States. The Choral Arts Society of Washington consists of three vocal ensembles; the Choral Arts Chorus, the Choral Arts Chamber Singers, and the Choral Arts Youth Choir.

== Activities ==
=== Concerts ===
Choral Arts features a symphonic chorus of over 190 professional caliber volunteer singers. It produces an annual series of subscription concerts, typically presented at the John F. Kennedy Center for the Performing Arts and other venues across the Metropolitan D.C. area.

The chorus also regularly performs with the National Symphony Orchestra, both at the Kennedy Center and at the Wolf Trap National Park for the Performing Arts. The chorus has also performed with the Atlanta Symphony Orchestra, Baltimore Symphony Orchestra, BBC Symphony, London Symphony Orchestra, Mariinsky Theatre Orchestra, New York Philharmonic, The Philadelphia Orchestra, Paris Opera Orchestra, and Prague Symphony Orchestra, among others.

The chorus has performed with many notable conductors, including Leonard Bernstein, Christoph Eschenbach, Leon Fleisher, Valery Gergiev, Lorin Maazel, Helmuth Rilling, Mstislav Rostropovich, Robert Shaw, and Leonard Slatkin.

In recent years, the chorus has made regular annual television appearances, including A Capitol Fourth during the 1812 Overture (Washington's annual Independence Day celebration), and the Kennedy Center Honors. The chorus has also occasionally appeared in the televised gala at Ford's Theatre. In 2000, the chorus appeared in an episode of The West Wing involving a major character's recovery from music-induced post-traumatic stress disorder.

=== Community outreach and education ===
Choral Arts maintains an active community outreach program, including an annual Christmas concert designed for families with young children, and an annual choral tribute concert dedicated to Martin Luther King Jr. Since 2004, the society has presented an annual Humanitarian Award honoring individuals who have furthered Dr. King's legacy. Honorees have included Dorothy Height, Congressman John Lewis, Marian Wright Edelman, Harris Wofford, Julian Bond, John Doar, Charlayne Hunter-Gault, Dr. Bernice Johnson Reagon, Norman Scribner, Nelson Mandela (in absentia), Dr. Ysaye M. Barnwell, and Rev. C.T. Vivian.

Choral Arts' education programs reach K-12 teachers and students, including students in the District of Columbia Public Schools, through in-school programming, a partner high school program, and specially designed curricular materials. The educational programs also reach prospective arts professionals at the university level through arts administration internships. In 2008, Choral Arts won the District of Columbia Mayor's Arts Award for Outstanding Contribution to Arts Education.

=== Tours ===
Choral Arts has toured both domestically and internationally, including international tours every three to four years since 1993 as follows:

- 1993 – Italy

The chorus participated in the Festival dei Due Mondi in Spoleto, giving performances of the Berlioz Requiem and the Rachmaninoff Vespers. The chorus also performed in Rome at the Basilica of Santi Apostoli, for High Mass at St. Peter's Basilica in the Vatican, and in San Ginesio.

- 1993 – Russia

The chorus joined with Mstislav Rostropovich and the National Symphony Orchestra for a performance of the finale from Prokofiev's Alexander Nevsky in Moscow's Red Square. The concert was attended by 100,000 people, including Russian president Boris Yeltsin. The chorus also performed in Bolshoi Hall at the Moscow Conservatory, and in Saint Petersburg at the Glinka Capella and the Bolshoi Zal of the Saint Petersburg Philharmonia. Due to Yeltsin's attendance in Red Square during the midst of the 1993 Russian constitutional crisis, and because the tour represented a homecoming for Rostropovich after the fall of the Soviet Union, the tour (and the Red Square performance in particular) received significant attention in the world press.

- 1996 – France

The chorus performed at the Evian Festival in Évian-les-Bains, in Arles, and at the Auvers-sur-Oise Festival. The chorus also performed in Paris at the Sorbonne Grand Amphitheatre and for High Mass at Notre Dame Cathedral.

- 2001 – Italy

The chorus performed in the final concert of the Festival dei Due Mondi in Spoleto's Piazza del Duomo, joining the Spoleto Festival Orchestra and Choir for Mendelssohn's Die erste Walpurgisnacht and Borodin's Polovetsian Dances. The chorus also performed the Mozart Requiem with the Sinfonica della Provincia di Bari as part of the festival, and performed a program of a cappella works in the Basilica Superiore (Upper Basilica) of the Cathedral of St. Francis of Assisi in Assisi.

- 2002 – England

Under the direction of Leonard Slatkin, the chorus joined the BBC Symphony Orchestra and the BBC Festival Chorus for a performance of Belshazzar's Feast at Royal Albert Hall. The performance was the first night of The Proms. The chorus also appeared with the City of London Sinfonia at the Cambridge Festival, and with the Manchester Camerata at the Chester Summer Music Festival and the Harrogate International Festival.

- 2005 – Argentina, Brazil

The chorus joined the Youth Orchestra of the Americas for two performances of Carmina Burana at Teatro Colon in Buenos Aires. The chorus also joined the Orquestra Petrobras Pró Música (now the Petrobras Symphony Orchestra) under the direction of Isaac Karabtchevsky for a performance of the Verdi Requiem at Teatro Municipal in Rio de Janeiro.

- 2008 – England

Under the direction of Valery Gergiev, the chorus joined the London Symphony Orchestra, the London Symphony Chorus and the Choir of Eltham College for two performances of Mahler's Symphony No. 8 at St Paul's Cathedral. The performances marked the conclusion of the annual City of London Festival. A recording of the performances was commercially released.

- 2012 – France

In August and September of 2012, Choral Arts participated in two distinct performances with Orchestre National De Lyon, conducted by Leonard Slatkin. The first performance was on 31 August in the abbey at La Chaise Dieuin the Haute-Loire region. Choral Arts participation in this performance included rarely performed vocal settings of The Polovetsian Dances of Borodin, Fauré’s Pavanne, and the Second Suite from Daphnis and Chloé. The following day, Slatkin, the Orchestre National De Lyon, and Choral Arts were joined by Stefan Bevier's Philharmonia Chorus from London and the Bernard Têtu Choeurs de Lyon in rehearsing Hector Berlioz' Grande Messe des morts (Great missa of the dead), also known as the Berlioz Requiem. The performances occurred on 4 and 5 September.

- 2015 – China

In May and June of 2015, Choral Arts partnered with the Qingdao Symphony Orchestra for a five-city tour of China, performing Carl Orff's Carmina Burana at internationally renowned venues such as the China National Center for the Performing Arts in Beijing, the Oriental Art Center in Shanghai and the Guangzhou Opera House.

== Recordings ==
The Choral Arts Chorus (or subgroups of the chorus) has appeared on at least sixteen commercially released recordings since 1971. The chorus has recorded under the batons of notable conductors including Antal Doráti, Valery Gergiev, Mstislav Rostropovich, Norman Scribner, and Leonard Slatkin.

On January 19, 1973, the chorus appeared (as the "Norman Scribner Singers") in A Concert for Peace at the Washington National Cathedral. The program featured the Mass in Time of War by Joseph Haydn. A recording of the performance received a 1973 Grammy Award Nomination for Best Choral Recording, with Scribner and Leonard Bernstein as co-nominees. (The concert was intended as a protest of the Vietnam War, and of the official Kennedy Center concert that same evening celebrating the second inauguration of Richard Nixon.)

A 1996 recording of John Corigliano's Of Rage And Remembrance received the 1996 Grammy Award for Best Classical Recording, with a certificate awarded to the men of the Choral Arts Society.

== History ==
Norman Scribner arrived on the Washington music scene in 1960, accepting a position as musical staff assistant for the Washington National Cathedral, choirmaster of St. Alban's Episcopal Church, and chapel organist for the St. Albans School for Boys. In 1963, he was appointed as staff keyboard artist for the National Symphony Orchestra, and that fall he conducted—and recruited a choir for—the symphony's annual production of Handel's Messiah after conductor Howard Mitchell "was impressed by his ability and intensity." The choir was reassembled for subsequent Messiah performances (appearing as the "National Symphony Orchestra Chorus"), but in 1965 it was decided to form an independent organization under Scribner's direction. The first concert on February 9, 1966 was a performance of Zoltán Kodály's Missa Brevis on an evening that also featured the Limón Dance Company.

The Choral Arts Society of Washington was formally incorporated on November 23, 1966. In 1968, the still-new group participated in the funeral procession of Robert F. Kennedy. By 1970, the chorus was composed of 100 voices and the organization had "both broadened and deepened its contacts with the community of greater Washington." That September, it received a $5,000 matching grant from the National Endowment for the Arts - the first ever given directly to a performing chorus, and given with the "personal imprimatur" of NEA chairman Nancy Hanks. Aided by this and other funding, the society was able to extend its concert season, expand its public service programming, and "retain Scribner on an annual salary for the first time," allowing him "to devote his full time to the post." The funding also allowed the group to "try more diversified programs, ranging from symphonic assignments to small chamber appearances using only a fraction of the entire 100-voice ensemble."

On September 8, 1971, members of the chorus participated (as the professional "Norman Scribner Choir") in the world premiere of Bernstein's MASS. The performance was part of the opening festivities for the Kennedy Center. Following its opening, Scribner was credited with "mov[ing] effectively to take advantage of the resources of the Kennedy Center, making it the central performing platform for his chorus." On October 29, 1974, the chorus performed underground for a ceremony during the construction of the Washington Metro, in the Metro Center station.

In 1981, The New York Times characterized the Choral Arts as "an excellent chorus of the type found today in many large American cities, with solid musicianship, smooth tone and competence in a wide range of choral repertory." The choir often collaborated with the NSO under Mstislav Rostropovich during his tenure as NSO music director (1977–94), and he independently led the chorus in performances of Rachmaninoff's Vespers on several occasions during the 1980s. A landmark 1987 recording of the Vespers—the first by an American chorus—significantly increased interest in recording the work among other choirs in the United States and elsewhere.

In 1990, Rostropovich stated that "[t]he existence of this wonderful group ... has completely changed the life of Washington, D.C." By then, the organization—"long a mom-and-pop operation"—had "metamorphosed into a highly professional enterprise" that included a full-time administrative staff, a "new and very active board," an endowment campaign, and a program devoted to minority participation in choral music in Washington. In 1993, the chorus embarked on its first two international tours - a summer tour to Italy, and a fall tour with the NSO to Russia that received world media attention (see Tours, above).

In August 2010, Scribner announced that he would retire as artistic director on August 31, 2012. On March 28, 2012, the society announced the appointment of Scott Tucker as its next artistic director. Tucker began his tenure with Choral Arts in its 2012–13 season, preparing the chorus for a performance of Beethoven's Missa Solemnis for the National Symphony Orchestra under the direction of Christoph Eschenbach. The 2013–14 season was Tucker's first to fully plan as artistic director.

== Organization ==
Choral Arts operates with an annual budget of approximately $2 million, with income derived from ticket revenues, individual and corporate donations, and government grants. During its twenty-fifth anniversary season in 1989–1990, the Society held a $2.5 million campaign to raise $2 million for an endowment fund and $500,000 for current expenses.

Choral Arts holds an annual black-tie holiday benefit concert and gala, an event described as "a highlight of the holiday social season" in Washington. The funds raised by the gala account for thirty percent of the society's annual budget.
