= Agape (disambiguation) =

Agape is commonly used by Christians to describe God's love, defining it as unconditional love.

Agape may also refer to:

- Agape, one of several Greek words for love
- Agape feast, certain meals celebrated by early Christians

== People ==
- Agape, Chionia, and Irene, Christian virgin-martyrs

== Books ==
- Agapē Agape, a novel by William Gaddis
- Eros and Agape, a two-volume treatise by Swedish theologian Anders Nygren

== Churches and organizations ==
- Agape Baptist Academy, Missouri, United States
- Agape Europe, the Western European branch of Cru, Campus Crusade for Christ
- Agape Foundation Fund for Nonviolent Social Change, an American non-profit foundation
- Agape International Spiritual Center, a New Thought church in Culver City, California
- Agape Lodge, a California-based chapter of Ordo Templi Orientis in the 1930s and 40s
- Agape Church, Rohri Taluka Sukkur District List of churches in Pakistan
- Agape Church of God Full Gospel Church, Thachukunnu, Puthuppally, Kottayam
- Agape Church, Five Points, Denver
- Agape College, Dimapur

== Music ==
- Agape (Christian rapper)
- Jeunes Agape, an award-winning Trinidad and Tobago musical-drama group
- Agape Music Festival, an annual Christian music festival in Greenville, Illinois

=== Albums ===
- Agápē (mixtape), a 2012 mixtape by JoJo
- Agape – Agape, a 1983 album by Popol Vuh
- Agape, 2001 album by Yoo Young-jin
- Agape, 1975 album by Rick Cassidy on Homespun Records
- Agapé, 2019 album by Shy'm

=== Songs ===
- "Agape" (song), a song by Zhang Liyin
- "Agapé", a song by Melocure
- "Agapi", a song by Despina Vandi from 10 Hronia Mazi
- "Agape", a song by Bear's Den
- "Agape", a song on Wake Up, Girls!
- "Agape", a song by Nicholas Britell
- "Agape", a song by Dead Can Dance on Anastasis (album)

== Other uses ==
- Agape (moth), a genus of moth
