= Carol Bernstein Ferry =

Carol Bernstein Ferry (July 29, 1924 – June 9, 2001) was a social change philanthropist and board member of DJB Foundation.

== Early life and education ==
Carol Bernstein was born Carol Underwood on July 29, 1924 in upstate New York, but, from the time she was four, she grew up in Portland, Maine, where her mother's family was located. Bernstein graduated from Wells College, and then she moved to Manhattan, where she worked as a writer, editor, and secretary for various publishing companies, including McGraw-Hill.

== First marriage ==
In 1953, she married Daniel Bernstein, a stockbroker who had inherited a large sum of money upon his father's death. Although she grew up in a rather apolitical family, Ms. Bernstein became increasingly radical by adopting many of her husband's views about left-wing politics.

In an interview conducted in the 1990s, Ferry speaks of her first marriage, presenting a picture of a lovely New York housewife who was largely uneducated in the ways of the world. In one interview, she laughingly recounts how Mr. Bernstein tried to teach her to record their personal finances, saying, " . . . [He] started teaching me double entry bookkeeping . . . This huge book spread out on the floor and it had lines going in every direction and little tiny numbers, that I started to cry and he closed the book and that was the last time we ever discussed my being the bookkeeper for the family."

Until Daniel Bernstein's death in 1970, in fact, Ms. Bernstein ran her household simply knowing that there was plenty of money for everything. It wasn't until she read his will that she discovered she had six million dollars in a foundation and another sixteen million in personal funds.

== Philanthropy and second marriage ==
This, then, was the beginning of Ferry's legacy of philanthropy. Rather than wanting to accrue more riches, she says that ". . . with a little hasty arithmetic, which took me only an hour and a half, I realized that in order to stay even and not have an increase or decrease, I had to give away two thousand dollars a day for ever . . ." Throughout the rest of her life, Ms. Bernstein and her second husband, W.H. "Ping" Ferry gave away vast sums of money, and they are still remembered by many of the organizations they helped to get started.

== Death ==
Ferry died on June 9, 2001. Having been diagnosed with terminal cancer, Ms. Bernstein Ferry prepared her own obituary, a call to the world to allow physician-assisted suicide for the terminally ill, wrote a longer letter explaining her choices, and swallowed a handful of sleeping pills in the presence of her family members.

In her farewell letter, Ferry wrote, "I've had a lucky life. I've had a lot of joy; I've had enough sorrow to know that I'm a member in good standing of the human race; I have tried to make myself useful." The many paid obituaries published in national newspapers upon her death show that, for many people, she did succeed in making a difference. One such notice, written by Marie Runyon, reads, "As generous and gutsy a human being as ever walked the earth. Loved humankind, especially those whom most try to avoid. A mind and heart of the rarest kind."

== DJB Foundation ==
=== Beginnings ===
The DJB Foundation was founded by Daniel Bernstein in 1946. Rather than creating this foundation for philanthropic causes, Mr. Bernstein created it simply as a way to keep the inheritance he received from his father safe until he could decide what to do with it. Mr. Bernstein and his wife Carol used money from the DJB Foundation for various small expenses over the course of their marriage; but it wasn't until the start of the Vietnam War, which Mr. Bernstein vehemently opposed, that the foundation found its niche in the world of leftist politics. Unfortunately, Mr. Bernstein was not able to bring the war to an end by buying up whole-page ads in local and national newspapers that gave people his informed perspective on the war.

=== Philanthropic giving ===
By the time Mr. Bernstein died of leukemia in 1970, six million dollars remained in the DJB Foundation, and his widow decided that it was time to spend all the money. Ms. Bernstein Ferry says, "So, in 1970 I started trying to shovel [the money] out, with not very much success because I just didn't know what I was doing." When she discovered how little she knew about being a successful philanthropist, Ms. Bernstein brought three other people into the mix: Steve Abrams, the Bernstein's long-time personal and business accountant, Robert S. Browne, a black economist interested in the fight against AIDS and in economic recovery programs for black farmers, and W. H. "Ping" Ferry, who had worked for the Ford Foundation and who would later become Carol Bernstein's second husband.

Rather than creating a foundation that would last into perpetuity, this team of four decided that they were going to spend all the money. The goal was to be out of money in ten years, but the money was spent in about four and a half. In an interview, Ms. Bernstein Ferry says that she wanted to spend all the money because they could know the needs of the present but not of the future and because she simply felt better as more of the money disappeared.

=== Goals ===
Thus began the interesting way in which the Ferrys, as many would later refer to them, gave out money. Rather than writing checks to major organizations for thousands of dollars, the DJB Foundation focused on "the empowering of small groups [and] individual people" by giving out smaller amounts to individuals and to grassroots organizations. The idea behind this style of giving was that a large sum of money can "corrupt and distort" the goals of an organization, but all it takes to get something started or to keep it going is a few hundred dollars.

Throughout the five years of foundation giving, the four philanthropists focused on human rights, economic recovery, and the anti-war effort. The foundation gave money to many large groups who were covers for "dissenters and resistors," and when the Foundation could not give more money to the political lobbying groups because of non-profit giving restrictions, Carol Bernstein – later with the help of her husband W.H. "Ping" Ferry – wrote personal checks for what she called "regular money."

=== Support ===
Although DJB Foundation focused mainly on smaller groups and smaller checks, it did regularly support a few larger efforts with larger amounts of money. These groups included the Inter-Religious Foundation for Community Organization, the Youth Project, and San Francisco's Young Adult Projects.

== Personal giving ==
After W.H. and Carol Ferry spent out the entire DJB Foundation, they started following the same path with the personal funds Carol had inherited from her first husband. Although the Ferrys used these funds during the time of the DJB Foundation to give to supplement the Foundation's giving, it was not until the foundation was depleted that they started on their own funds in earnest.

=== Philanthropic goals ===
For the most part, Mr. and Mrs. Ferry followed the same pattern with their personal giving as with their foundation giving: they tended to give small amounts to grassroots organizations. One difference, though, was that the couple wrote many checks for the general living expenses of individuals and organizations. In an oral history, Carol states that this was because it is typically difficult for organizations to raise money for basic expenses instead of major projects.

Throughout the duration of their personal giving, the Ferrys focused largely on the same types of organizations – and many of exactly the same organizations – that had been the focus of the DJB Foundation. Their giving went to many left-wing political groups and many groups who were seeking to do some specific good in their communities or the world at large. The Ferrys also gave some funds to education, the arts, and animal rights, although they did not focus on these areas as much since these organizations usually had no trouble raising funds.

The Ferrys said that they often spent time skimming newspaper articles for noteworthy organizations or individuals who needed money, and they would often write checks without being asked. For instance, the Ferrys once supported a doctor in a small, poor, all-black neighborhood who was running his own clinic there; the doctor had never even heard of the Ferrys when until he received their first check, and they continued to support him for several years.

Although the Ferrys rarely wrote checks for more than two or three thousand dollars at a time, they gave larger amounts – sometimes more than $25,000 a year – to major companies who were doing work the Ferrys considered very important. Another prerequisite for these large checks was that the company had to have a large enough budget that the Ferrys' money would help without creating a situation in which leadership could be corrupted by a huge new influx of funds. Some of the organizations the Ferrys continually supported include:

- The Africa Fund
- The American Civil Liberties Union Foundation
- The Center for Constitutional Rights
- The Emergency Land Fund
- The Twenty-First Century Foundation
- The Fund for Peace

The Ferrys supported hundreds of individuals and organizations over the years, and after Ping's death in 1995, Carol continued writing checks, although the numbers and amounts dwindled over the years as the Ferrys' personal funds ran down. After Ping's death, Mrs. Bernstein Ferry continued to support organizations such as the Advocacy Institute; the Agape Foundation, which sought for non-violent social change; the Albany, NY Friends Foundation; the Aleph Alliance for Jewish Renewal; the Westchester Rutman Special Olympics; and the Alternatives to Violence Project.
