= Daniel J. Bernstein (businessman) =

American businessman, philanthropist, and political activist

- Born: Daniel Justin Bernstein; September 20, 1918; New York City, US
- Died: August 20, 1970 (aged 51); Scarsdale, New York, US
- Education: Cornell University, Harvard Business School
- Occupation: businessman
- Known for: DJB Foundation
- Spouse: Carol Underwood (m. 1953)
- Children: 2

Daniel Justin Bernstein (September 20, 1918 – August 20, 1970) was an American businessman, philanthropist, and liberal political activist.

== Early life and business career ==
Daniel J. Bernstein was born in New York City in 1918, the youngest of three brothers. Graduating from Cornell University in 1940, he went to Harvard Business School for a year and a half before going to work for the Land Conservation Corps.

When United States' entered World War II, Bernstein volunteered for the Navy and served from 1942 to 1946.

After leaving the military, Bernstein talked with Jim Robinson, a minister in Harlem, who guided him to the National Scholarship Fund and Service for Negro Students, which Bernstein helped expand.

After a few years he entered the business world and eventually began working for Loeb, Rhoades & Co., a Wall Street investment firm. Bernstein initiated hedge funds and became extremely wealthy, largely through betting long on Japanese stocks. In 1953, he married Carol Underwood, with whom he had two children. In 1956, while recuperating from knee surgery, Bernstein began working from home as an independent stockbroker.

== Philanthropic activities ==
The DJB Foundation was created in 1948 by Daniel Bernstein as a holding operation for the inheritance received from his father. When Bernstein died in 1970, approximately $5 million of his estate went to the DJB Foundation. This sum was substantially all of the Foundation's capital, as at his death it had about $100,000. Bernstein also left considerable sums to the National Council of Churches' Clergy and Laity Concerned About Vietnam, and to the Institute for Policy Studies.

The foundation was designed with an unusual mission that it hoped would be a model for other such efforts: that it spent all of its money in a few years in order to do the greatest good then and for the future. This was an alternative to the traditional model of spending small amounts arising from investment activities and attempting to exist in perpetuity.

== Political activism ==
The Bernsteins always considered themselves to be liberal, but after a visit to Cuba in 1960 shortly after the Cuban Revolution, the couple told their friends and acquaintances about their positive experiences. Thereafter, the Bernsteins' political and social lives moved leftward. Paul Swaze, editor of the Monthly Review, and other well known figures on the left were often present at the Bernsteins' home. They also supported senators like J. William Fulbright.

After their Cuba trip, and when Castro became friendly with the Arab states, Bernstein lost many of his Jewish clients and almost lost his entire business. He built up another trade and continued to voice his beliefs. In the 1960s, he supported the causes of civil rights, the end of apartheid in South Africa, and the anti-Vietnam War movement became a major focus of Bernstein's attention. Working with Robert Maury Hundley, a student at Union Theological Seminary in New York City, Bernstein supported Hundley in a campaign to enlist student body presidents and campus newspaper editors in refusing to serve in an "unjust and immoral war." Bernstein purchased full-page advertisements, at a cost more than $1 million, in newspapers such as The New York Times, the first political ad ever published by the Times, with over 550 student leaders signing the commitment to refuse service. Shortly before the ad was published in the spring of 1968, Bernstein introduced Hundley to Robert F. Kennedy, saying, "By next week Robert will be as famous as you are." Many of the student leaders who signed the 4 page ad later became nationally prominent leaders, such as Robert Reich and Strobe Talbott. Al Lowenstein discouraged Harvard student body president Greg Craig and Georgetown leader Bill Clinton from signing the ad, since Lowenstein felt that either of them could one day be president of the United States.

== Death ==
Bernstein died of leukemia on New York City in August 1970, one month before his 52nd birthday.
