= DJB =

DJB may refer to:

- Daniel J. Bernstein (born 1971), American mathematician.
- DJB Foundation
- Enough is Enough (Dosta je bilo), a political party in Serbia
- IATA code for Sultan Thaha Airport
- German Judo Federation (Deutscher Judo-Bund)
- German Women Lawyers Association (Deutscher Juristinnenbund)
