= Suzanne Mettler =

American political scientist and author

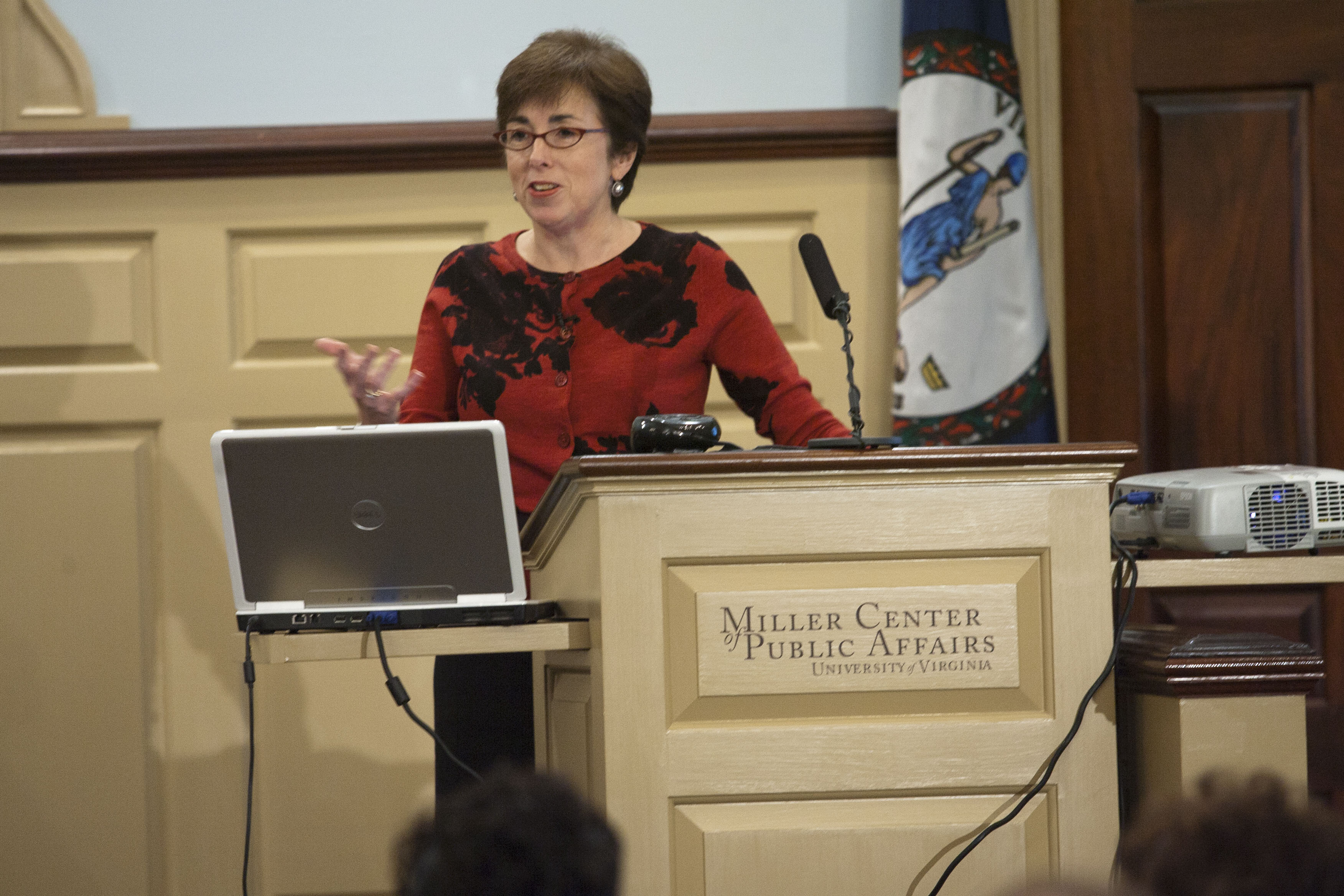
- Mettler in October 2007
- Education: Boston College, B.A. University of Illinois, Masters; Cornell University, Ph.D.
- Occupation: Academic Political Scientist
- Employer(s): Cornell University; Syracuse University

Suzanne Mettler is an American political scientist and author, known for her research about the way Americans view and respond to the government in their lives, and helping to stimulate the study of American political development.

== Education and career ==
Mettler received a B.A. from Boston College in 1984, a master's from the University of Illinois (Urbana) in political science, 1989, and a Ph.D. from Cornell University in government, 1994. From 1994 to 2007 she taught at Syracuse University, rising from assistant professor to full professor at the Maxwell School of Citizenship and Public Affairs, Department of Political Science.

Since July 2007, she has taught at Cornell University. Between 2007 and 2018, she held the position of Clinton Rossiter Professor of American Institutions, Department of Government, Cornell University. Since 2018, she serves as the John L. Senior Professor of American Institutions in the Government Department at Cornell. She received a Guggenheim Fellowship in 2019.

== Works ==
Mettler co-edited the Oxford Handbook of American Political Development (2016). Mettler subscribes to the subfield of political science called American political development (APD), which recognizes the need for an analytic approach to researching and understanding U.S. politics. She feels there is a distinctiveness of the APD approach, which studies "the causes, nature, and consequences of key transformative periods and central patterns in American political history," as well the "durable shifts in governing authority" in the United States. Mettler has been described as a prominent Americanist scholar in this relatively new field, which blurs the border between political science and political history. Her particular interests include inequality, democratization and civic engagement. She has written six books, most prominently two winners of the Kammerer Award of the American Political Science Association for the best book on U.S. national policy: Soldiers to Citizens: The G.I. Bill and the Making of the Greatest Generation, 2005 (Oxford University Press), and Dividing Citizens: Gender and Federalism in New Deal Public Policy, 1998 (Cornell University Press), which also won the Greenstone Book Prize and the Martha Dertick Book Award. Other books include The Government-Citizen Disconnect (Russell Sage 2018); Degrees of Inequality: How The Politics of Higher Education Sabotaged the American Dream (Basic Books 2014); The Submerged State: How Invisible Government Programs Undermine American Democracy (University of Chicago 2011); and Four Threats: The Recurring Crises of American Democracy (St. Martin’s Press, 2020), co-authored with Robert C. Lieberman. Mettler has written for a broader audience with publications in New York Times, L.A. Times, Foreign Affairs, and Salon. The election of Trump heightened Mettler's concerns about the future of American democracy. In 2017, Mettler initiated the American Democracy Collaborative, a group of political scientists "who are evaluating the health of democracy in the United States".

=== Selected op-eds and short essays ===
- "Our Hidden Government Benefits", The New York Times, September 11, 2011
- "Why Skimp On the G.I. Bill", Los Angeles Times, November 11, 2011
- "20,000 Leagues Under the State", Washington Monthly, July, 2011
- "We Are the 96 Percent", with John M. Sides, The New York Times, September 25, 2012
- "College, the Great Unleveler", The New York Times, March 1, 2014
- "5 Things You Didn't Know About for-Profits", The Century Foundation, March 19, 2014
- "Why should we care about public opinion about Obamacare", with Lawrence Jacobs, The Hill, July 25, 2016
- "Democracy On the Brink, Protecting the Republic in Trump's America", Foreign Affairs, August 2017
- "The Welfare Bogeyman", The New York Times, July 23, 2018
