= John L. Senior =

American sports executive

John Lawson Senior (March 31, 1879, in Montgomery, New York – 1946) was a sports administrator and the founder of Slope Day at Cornell University.

Senior graduated from Cornell University in 1901 and was a member of the Sphinx Head Society. Senior organized the first "Spring Day," the predecessor to the modern Slope Day, in March 1901 to meet an athletics deficit of $6,000. His efforts were so successful that he was appointed as the first Graduate Manager of Athletics at Cornell (a position which later became the director of athletics). Senior also became the first graduate manager of the Cornell University Glee Club. His wife endowed the John L. Senior Professor of American Institutions at Cornell University, which has been held (in order) by Dexter Perkins, Clinton Rossiter, Theodore Lowi, and currently by Suzanne Mettler. His wife also endowed the fourth floor study rooms in Olin Library, named in honor of John L. Senior.

| Preceded by none | Director of Cornell athletics 1901–1907 | Succeeded by William J. Dugan |
