= 900 Stewart Avenue =

Building in Ithaca, New York, noted for its unique Egyptian Revival architecture

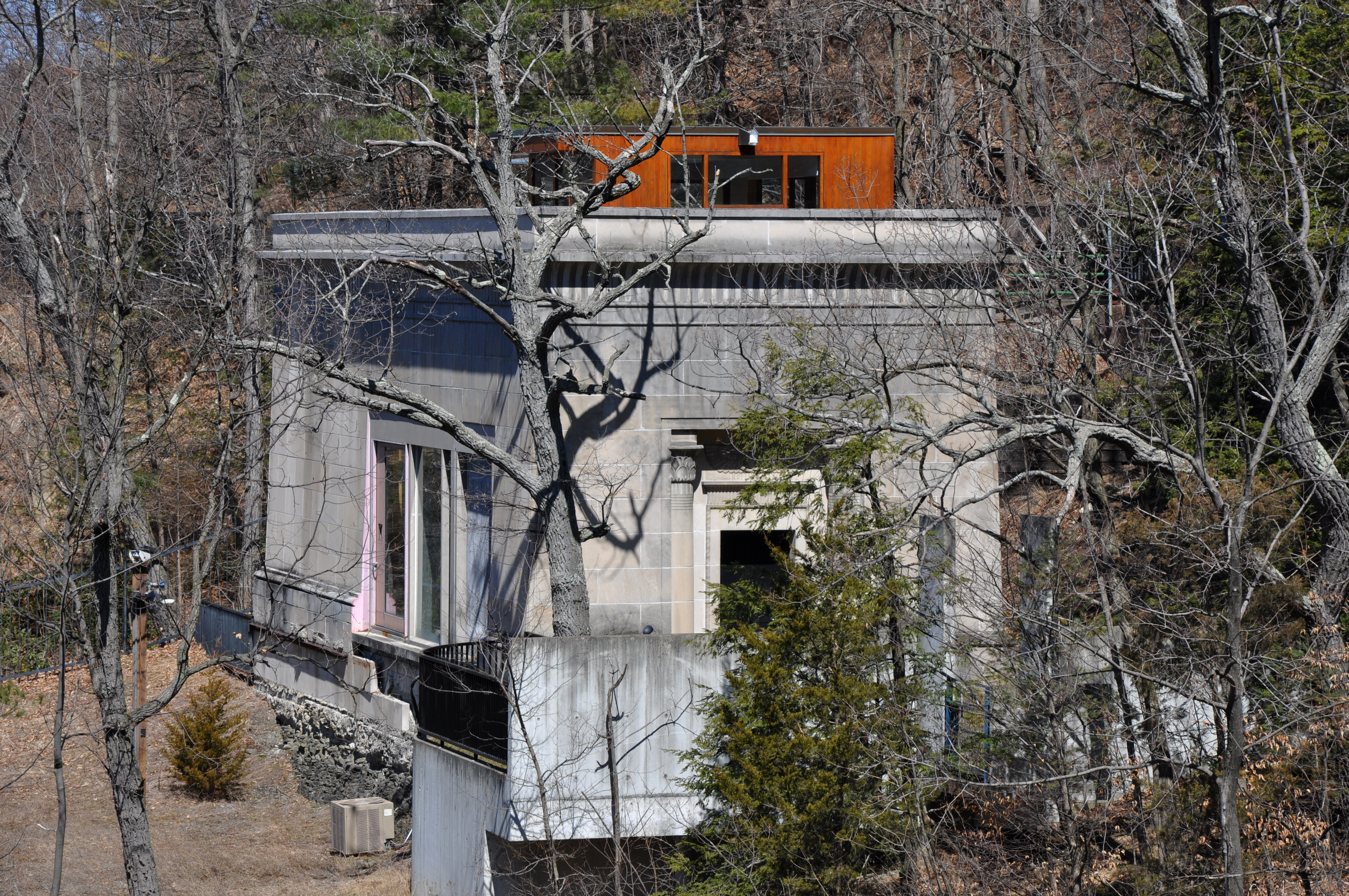
- 900 Stewart Avenue, the former residence of Carl Sagan in Ithaca, New York, in April 2014

General information
- Architectural style: Egyptian Revival
- Location: 900 Stewart Ave., Ithaca, New York, U.S.
- Coordinates: 42°27′10.1″N 76°29′24.6″W
- Completed: 1926
- Opened: 1926
- Owner: Ann Druyan

900 Stewart Avenue is a building in Ithaca, New York, noted for its Egyptian Revival architecture, its dramatic placement partway down a cliff, and being the residence of astronomer Carl Sagan. The building is on a ledge about 50 feet (15 m) below street level, overlooking Fall Creek and Ithaca Falls.

One of just two Egyptian Revival buildings in Tompkins County, along with the Masonic Temple in downtown Ithaca, it is part of the Cornell Heights Historic District.

== History ==
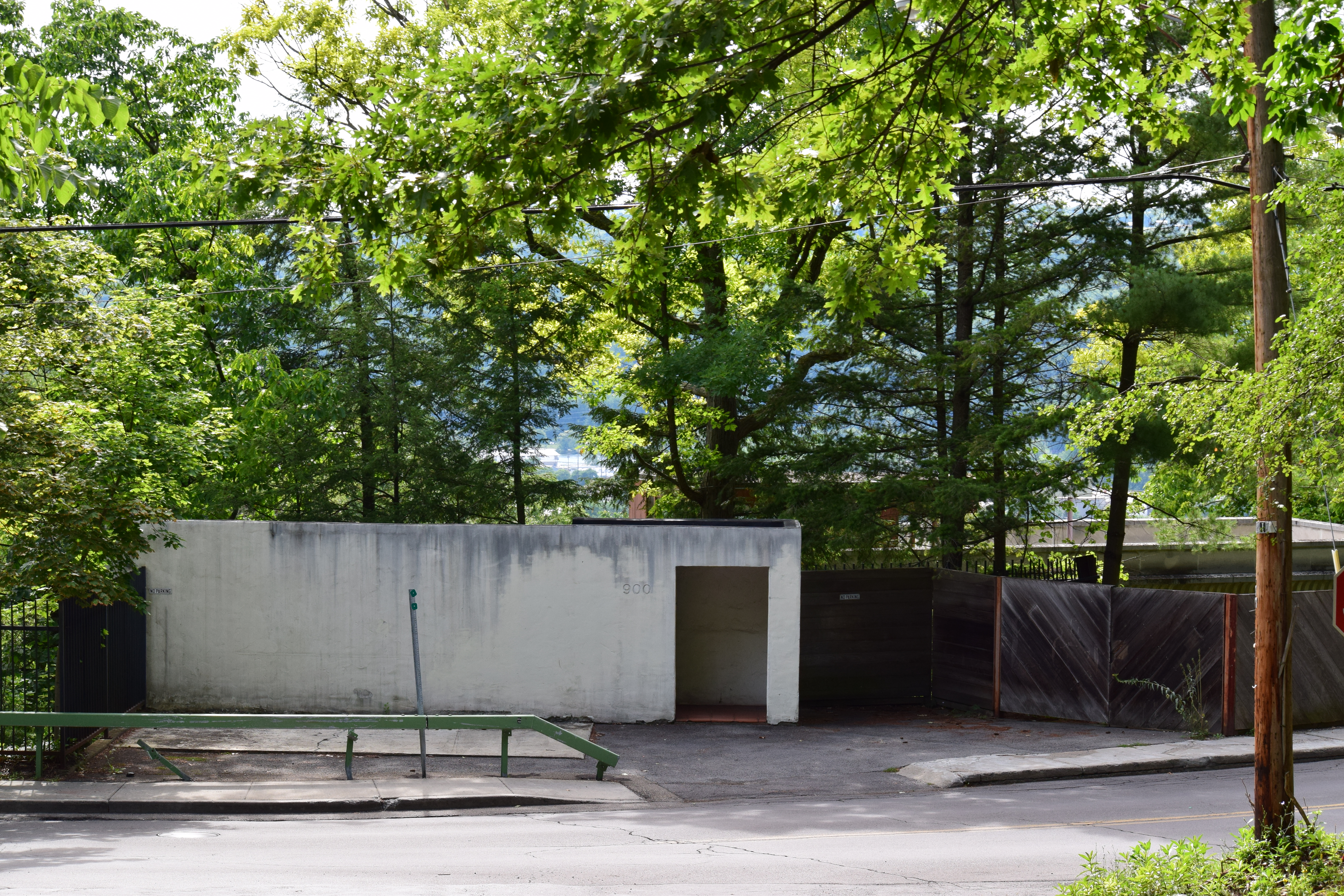
900 Stewart Avenue from the road, August 2016

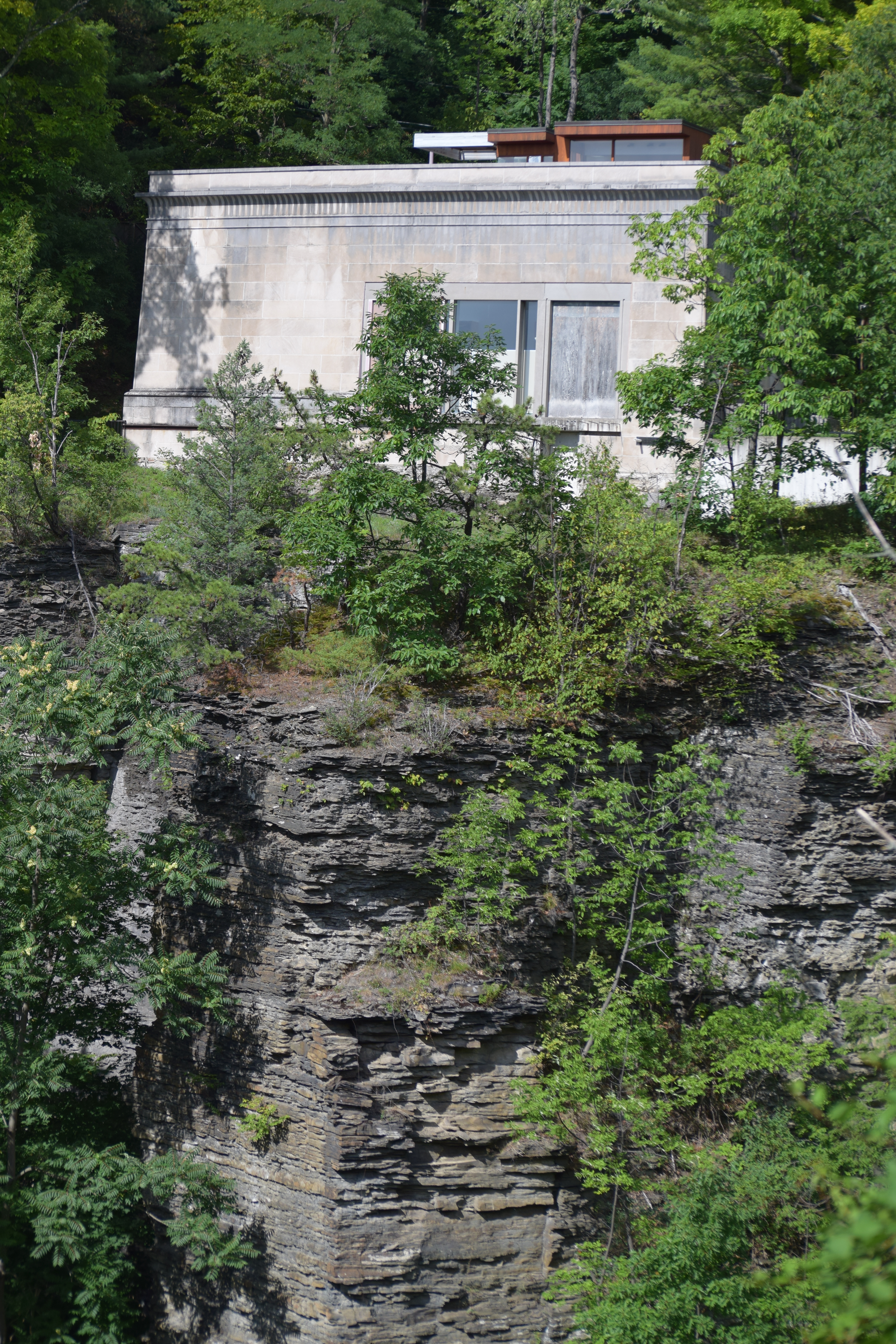
900 Stewart Avenue from across the gorge, August 2016

The building was built as the meeting place of the Sphinx Head Society, a Cornell University secret society formed in 1890. The society had discussed building a meeting place since the early 1900s, and bought the site in 1908. At the time, the site was far away from campus, secluded by trees, and lacking neighbors across the gorge. After raising $25,000 they hired local architect J. Lakin Bainbridge, who also designed the Tompkins County Courthouse. Ground was broken in 1925, and the building was finished in 1926. The design was intended to resemble an Egyptian tomb, perhaps partly as a delayed expression of the popularity of Egyptian Revival architecture in the late 1800s, perhaps partly as a resurgence in popular interest in Classical Egypt after the opening of Tutankhamun's tomb in 1922, and perhaps partly because of similar structures at Yale University and Dartmouth College, the Skull and Bones tomb and the Sphinx, respectively.

The building only had a single door, and no windows. A journalist described the eeriness of being inside it:

The entrance through a doorway on the monumental side, flanked by ornamental stone pillars beneath Egyptian symbols on the lintel and the frieze set the stage. After walking through a small entryway between cloak and storage rooms, the initiated entered a long, lofty rectangular room, only dimly lit by a few sconces on the side walls. Wooden pews extended along the unadorned stone walls.

Eventually, the tomb became less useful to the society, due to the lack of nearby parking, and the increased property taxes and maintenance costs. In 1969, the society sold the property to the next-door neighbor, physicist Robert Wilson. He used it as a sculpture studio before selling it to architect and design professor Steve Mensch in 1979. "I'd been trying to buy it for the last eight years," Mensch told The Cornell Daily Sun:

The first thing that attracted me to the place was that it's so bizarre, it's such a fantasy structure. When I tried to change it, the impulse was to intensify the strangeness ... I loved the space. The building so contradicted the site. It was such an introverted space at such an extroverted site.

Mensch undertook a substantial renovation. He cut a huge, floor-to-ceiling window in the gorge-facing side of the formerly windowless tomb. He built a one-story addition with three bedrooms just below the tomb, a glass pavilion on the same level as the tomb, and a new parking spot and building for the entry staircase. He did large parts of the construction work himself, and held his office hours on the site. "One no longer has the sense of entering an ancient, shadowy, secret chamber in a remote location," a journalist wrote. "It's a good deal more like finding an unsuspected open-air museum set in the midst of a small but lovely park overlooking the city."

Astronomer Carl Sagan bought it in 1981, on returning to Cornell from several years in Los Angeles making the documentary Cosmos. He used the complex as a residence for many years, and looked for an architect to help him renovate it. Eventually, he hired Atelier Jullian and Pendleton, whose principal, Guillermo Jullian de la Fuente, had been a student of Le Corbusier. The architects designed a new, separate residence for Sagan in Cayuga Heights, and prepared an extensive, two-stage redesign plan for the tomb to turn it into a study for him and his wife, Ann Druyan. Mensch's additions were demolished, with the exception of the new entry staircase. New windows and skylights were added. On top of the tomb, a small teak penthouse was built, inspired by "images of canal barges and of boats on the lake." The renovation, which took place from 1990 to 1992, was featured in a photo spread in Architectural Digest. The second phase of the renovation, which was to include a series of additional buildings terraced above and below the tomb, were never built.

Sagan's biographer William Poundstone writes:

Like Sagan himself, the Sphinx House was visible and flamboyant––and also remote and unapproachable. ... Its spectacular seclusion drew looky-loos who might otherwise not have cared where Carl Sagan lived. Sagan's "Graceland" had a security system worthy of its Memphis counterpart. An iron gate slammed behind visitors. Surveillance cameras silently scanned visitors' movements. In lieu of a moat, the 200-foot plunge to the gorge acted as a guarantor of privacy.

At one point, the fraternity across the gorge invited Sagan to dinner; when he declined, suspecting them of having repeatedly vandalized a visibility mirror on the house's driveway, they arranged strings of Christmas lights to project the words, "Carl Sagan Sucks!" across the gorge at him, although other accounts suggest the sign actually read "E-A-T M-E." A popular (and inaccurate) local rumor was that there was a secret tunnel between the house and Cornell, so that Sagan could drive his Porsche to campus unmolested.

After Sagan's death, his papers remained in the building until being transferred to the Library of Congress in 2012.

Writing for New York magazine in 2014, Sagan's daughter described the house as "like something straight out of ancient Sumeria, or Indiana Jones—but it was not, in either case, something you'd expect to find in upstate New York."

In November 2024, Sagan's widow, Ann Druyan, sold the house to scrap metal mogul Adam Weitsman "for $2 million, far above its assessed value of $585,000". Weitsman announced plans to restore the building, with design by Pei Cobb Freed & Partners, to add a troll sculpture by Danish artist Thomas Dambo, and to turn the property into an observatory in partnership with Harvard astronomer Avi Loeb.
