= Cornell Heights Historic District =

Historic district in New York, United States

- U.S. National Register of Historic Places
- U.S. Historic district
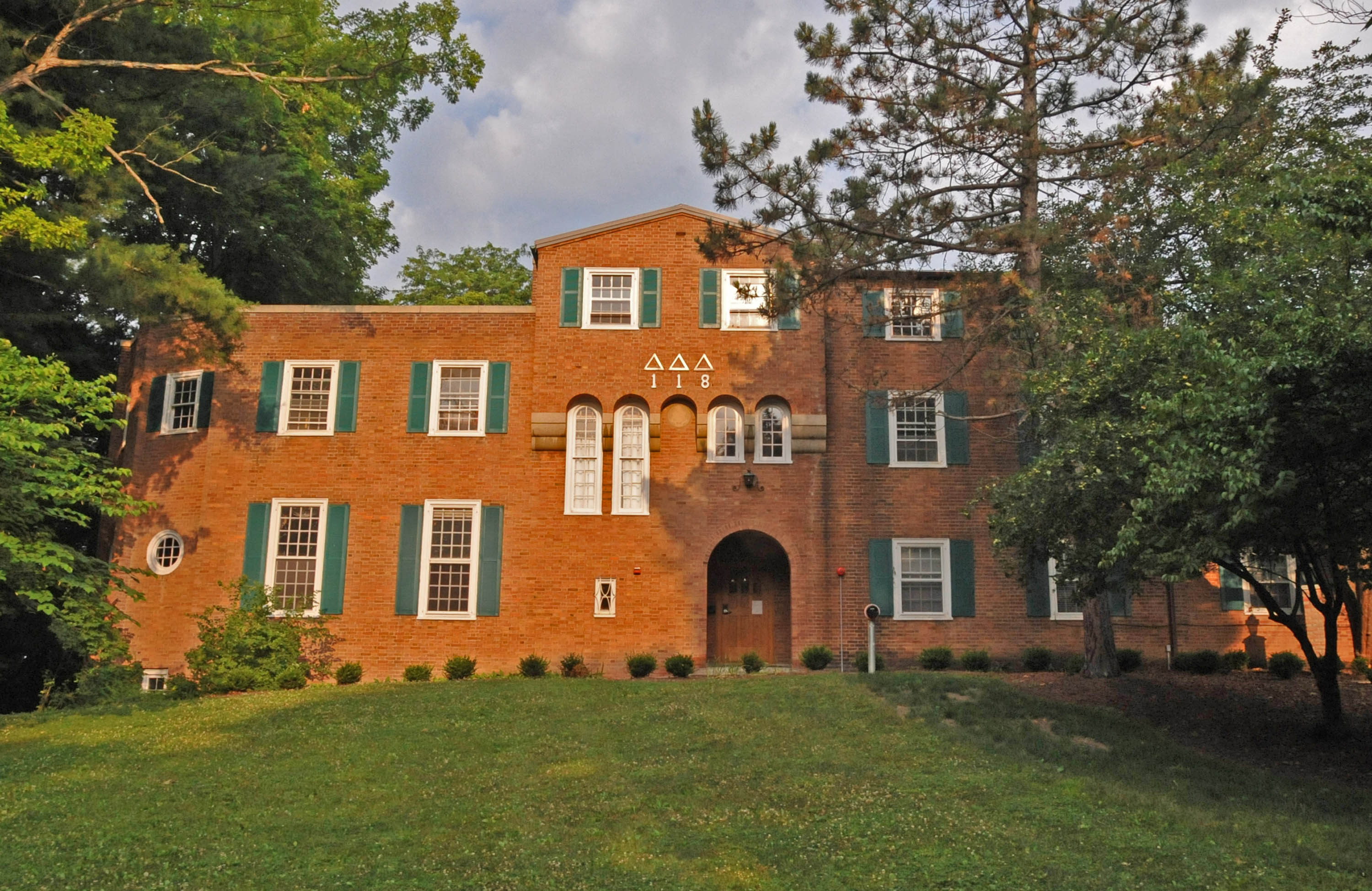

- Location within New York Location within the United States
- Location: Roughly bounded by Kline Rd., Highland Ave., Brock Ln., Triphammer Rd., Fall Creek, Stewart Ave., and Needham Pl., Cayuga Heights, New York
- Coordinates: 42°27′18″N 76°29′13″W
- Area: 133 acres (54 ha)
- Architect: Multiple
- Architectural style: Late 19th And Early 20th Century American Movements, Late 19th And 20th Century Revivals
- NRHP reference No.: 89001205
- Added to NRHP: September 14, 1989

Cornell Heights Historic District is a national historic district located in Ithaca, New York. The district contains 208 contributing buildings and one contributing site. It consists of an early 20th-century residential subdivision developed between 1898 and 1942, and originally conceived as a "residence park" for faculty members of Cornell University, directly north of the Fall Creek gorge.

It was listed on the National Register of Historic Places in 1989.

Carl Sagan's former house, a converted 1926 Egyptian Revival building perched halfway down the cliff of Fall Creek gorge, is a contributing building of the district.
