= Wilbur Hugh Ferry =

American journalist (1910–1995)

Wilbur H. 'Ping' Ferry (December 17, 1910 – September 30, 1995) was an American activist and philanthropist.

== Early life and career ==
Ferry was born in Detroit on 17 December 1910, the son of Hugh Joseph Ferry, President and chairman of the Board of the Packard Motor Company, and Fay Ferry. He attended the University of Detroit High School where he was a star football player. Ferry graduated from Dartmouth College in 1932 and his first job was job teaching English and Latin at Choate Rosemary Hall. From 1933 to 1941, he pursued a career in journalism, though in 1936 he briefly held the position of Director of Publicity for Eastern Airlines.

Between 1942 and 1945 Ferry held a series of positions including consultant for the International Labour Organization (1940–1944), Chief Investigator in New Hampshire for the Office of Price Administration (1942–1944), Director of Public Relations for the Congress of Industrial Organizations (1944), and member of the U. S. Strategic Bombing Survey, Southwest Pacific Area (1945). From 1945 to 1954, Ferry was a partner in the New York public relations firm of Earl Newsom (ENCO). The Ford Foundation used this public relations agency, and Ferry was responsible for writing speeches for Henry Ford.

In 1951, while still working for Earl Newsom, Ferry became a public relations adviser for the Ford Foundation. Ferry was also a personal friend of Robert M. Hutchins who became the president of the Fund for the Republic, a non-profit organization whose basic objectives were to research and analyze civil liberties and civil rights. Ferry became Vice President of the fund in 1954 and was responsible for its administration and public relations. He continued to work for the fund after it moved from New York City to Santa Barbara, California in 1959, when it changed its name to the Center for the Study of Democratic Institutions (CSDI). Ferry published a number of essays while at CSDI, including "The Corporation and the Economy" (1959), "The Economy Under Law" (1961), "Caught in the Horn of Plenty" (1962), "What Price Peace" (1963), "Masscom as Educator" (1966), "Farewell to Integration" (1967), "Tonic and Toxic Technology" (1967), and "The Police State is Here" (1969).

On August 7, 1962, Ferry delivered a speech titled "Myths, Cliches and Stereotypes" to the Western States Democratic Conference in Seattle, Washington, where he was very critical of the head of the Federal Bureau of Investigation, J. Edgar Hoover. This led to criticism across the political divide including from Attorney General Robert F. Kennedy and attacks by the press across the country. However, Ferry's critical view of Hoover came to be shared among many in later years.

Ferry stayed at the CDSI until 1969 when he was sacked after an internal feud. He then created his own job, hiring himself out for $6,000 a year to ten California philanthropists. One of the ten was Carol Bernstein, whose late husband was part of the Loews Inc. communications empire.

== Personal life ==
Ferry's marriage to Jolyne Marie Gillier in 1937 ended in divorce in 1972. In 1973 he met the woman who became his second wife, Carol Bernstein. Immediately after marrying, the two started playing an active role in human rights, political causes, prevention of environmental problems, and the overall struggles of places such as Africa. Ferry organized the exploratory project on Conditions for Peace in 1974. The work with Africa began in 1976 and didn't end until 1987 when he organized the Citizens for Peace Treaty.

In 1968, he signed the "Writers and Editors War Tax Protest" pledge, vowing to refuse tax payments in protest against the Vietnam War. During his politically active years, he was noted for his outspoken position against the death penalty. Wilbur H. Ferry died from Parkinson's disease on September 30, 1995, at the age of 84, in Scarsdale, New York.

== DJB Foundation ==
Funded with money left over from Carol Bernstein Ferry's first marriage, the DJB Foundation was the start of the Ferrys' contributions to many small groups and different causes all around the nation. Among the main recipients were philanthropy groups dedicated to human rights, economic recovery, and the anti-war effort. The Ferrys gave out smaller sums of money than many other organizations did because they believed that giving out huge amounts could "corrupt and distort" an organization's goals. Many causes received two hundred dollars or less.

The Ferrys set out with the goal of donating all their six million dollars within ten years, though they met the goal in about four and a half years. Mrs. Ferry explained that giving all the money away made sense to her because "they could know the needs of the present, but not of the future." Some of the larger efforts supported by the DJB included the Inter-Religious Foundation for Community Organization, the Youth Project, and San Francisco's Young Adult Projects. Among the political action groups they supported were the American Civil Liberties Union, and the Center for Constitutional Rights. Among the environmental groups were the Africa Fund (a non-profit organization which gives finance and expertise to "sustainable development projects" in East Africa.

Overall, the Foundation spent out its $18 million endowment on a variety of causes, to finance "things that no one else would fund because they were too radical for conventional foundations."

== Work ==
- The Corporation and the Economy (1959)
- The Economy Under Law (1961)
- Caught on the Horn of Plenty (1962)
- What Price Peace (1963)
- Massomm as Educator (1965)
- Farewell to Integration (1967)
- Tonic and Toxic Technology (1967)
- The Police State is Here (1969)

== See also ==
- The Triple Revolution
