= Sphinx Head =

Honor society at Cornell University, US

- Sphinx Head Society emblem, 1891
- Founded: October 11, 1890; 136 years ago Cornell University
- Type: Senior society
- Affiliation: Independent
- Status: Active
- Scope: Local
- Chapters: 1
- Headquarters: Ithaca, New York; United States

The Sphinx Head Society is the oldest senior honor society at Cornell University. Sphinx Head recognizes Cornell seniors who have demonstrated respectable strength of character on top of dedication to leadership and service at Cornell University. In 1929 The New York Times held that election into Sphinx Head and similar societies constituted "the highest non-scholastic honor within reach of undergraduates."

== Founding ==
Sphinx Head was founded on October 11, 1890, by a group of ten men from the senior class. The Society was founded to "create and maintain a stronger feeling" for Cornell University and to promote "a closer and stronger friendship among members of the Senior class." The New York Times referred to Sphinx Head as "a secret senior society of the nature of Skull and Bones", a senior honor society at Yale University of which Andrew Dickson White, Cornell University's co-founder and first president, was a member. White encouraged the formation of a secret society system on the Cornell campus.

In 1926, the society built a clubhouse for itself designed to resemble an Egyptian tomb perched halfway down the cliff on the Fall Creek gorge. It sold the building in 1969, and it eventually became the home and office of astronomer Carl Sagan.

== Membership ==
Sphinx Head, Class of 1899

Each year, Sphinx Head taps fewer than forty men and women of the senior class for membership. Since the Society's founding, membership has been "reserved for the most respected" members of the senior class. The names of newly tapped Sphinx Heads were published in The New York Times through the 1930s, but are now published exclusively in The Cornell Daily Sun.

Sphinx Head awards honorary membership to Cornell administrators, faculty, staff, and alumni for their "significant personal and/or professional accomplishment, outstanding leadership, distinguished service to the university, and interest in and commitment to undergraduate student life and development." Notable honorary members of Sphinx Head include Tata Sons Chairman Emeritus Ratan Tata, Atlantic Philanthropies founder Chuck Feeney, and the 12th President of Cornell University, David Skorton.

== Symbols and traditions ==
Historic Sphinx Head Tomb

Sphinx Head has "retained an aura of mystery throughout its history on campus", holding some "closely guarded secrets and traditions." Although membership in Sphinx Head is public, the proceedings of the Society remain private.

== Activities ==
Since founding the Society, Sphinx Head members have been responsible for starting many long-standing Cornell University traditions such as the annual Dragon Day celebration, the use of "The Big Red" to describe Cornell athletics, as well as Spring Fest, the precursor to the current Slope Day celebration.

== Notable members ==
Members of Sphinx Head have held many prominent positions within Cornell University serving as presidents, provosts, deans, directors of athletics, Cornell Council members, trustees, and chairpersons of the board of trustees. More than one-third of the presidents of the Cornell University Alumni Association have been members and twenty percent of the chairpersons of the Cornell University Board of Trustees have been affiliated with the Society. Names of alumni can be found on the Cornell campus on Bartels Hall, Indimine Athletic Field, Samuel C. Johnson School of Business Management, Robert Kane Track, Jansen Noyes Community Center, Jerome H. Holland International Living Center, Robert Purcell Community Center, Kheel Center for Labor-Management Documentation & Archives, Willard Straight Hall and Upson Hall. Numerous members are also profiled in The 100 Most Notable Cornellians.
