= Charles Winick =

American writer and psychologist

- Born: August 4, 1922; The Bronx, New York City
- Died: July 4, 2015 (aged 92); New York City
- Occupations: Academician, author, psychologist, sociologist, military intelligence officer
- Notable work: The New People: Desexualization in American Life, The Lively Commerce, The Dictionary Of Anthropology

Charles Winick (August 4, 1922 – July 4, 2015) was an American author, psychologist, professor of anthropology and sociology, and academician, noted for his work in the fields of gender, drug addiction, and prostitution.

After serving in the United States Army during World War II, he was a professor of sociology at Graduate Center of the City University of New York and the City College of New York, taught at Columbia University, and was the author of more than 40 books, including a book which lamented the decline in the difference between the genders, studies about prostitution in American society, and several books on drug addiction. Winick also challenged the accepted view of narcotics addiction, contending that opiates can be relatively safe for some users but cause harm because they are taken under adverse conditions.

== Early life and education ==
Winick was born in the Bronx, New York City, to Russian Jewish immigrants. His father was a house painter. He had four brothers. As a child, his family was so poor that they were spotlighted in "The New York Times Neediest Cases" campaign, and the reporter who wrote the story was so distressed by their poverty that he gave the family his own overcoat.

Winick graduated from the City College of New York and served in the U.S. Army during World War II as a paratrooper and officer in the 82nd Airborne Division. He was initially assigned to military intelligence, was posted to Supreme Headquarters Allied Expeditionary Forces in London, and then was sent to the secret P.O. Box 1142 unit in Virginia to interrogate prominent Nazi prisoners of war, including Wernher von Braun and German nuclear scientists.

== Career ==
After the war he earned a doctorate from New York University and served in the army reserves, retiring as a Lieutenant Colonel. In addition to his academic work, he was research director of the Anti-Defamation League, the New York State Narcotics Commission, and the J. Walter Thompson advertising agency. In 1959 he wrote Taste and the Censor in Television for the Fund for the Republic. In 1962, while on the Columbia faculty, he was hired by NBC as a children's programming consultant.

Winick's book The New People: Desexualization in American Life, published in 1969, contended that American society was "following the path of Ancient Greece and Rome" by gradually becoming a "neutered society". He wrote that "equality does not mean equivalence, and a difference is not deficiency". Winick maintained that America was becoming a "beige-colored" society, and that distinctions between the genders were becoming blurred. His writings also highlighted the sexualization and gender roles presented to children in advertising and popular culture, including criticizing Barbie dolls in a 1964 article, which was an unpopular observation at the time.

His views on drug addiction were controversial. He developed the theory of "maturing out", arguing that many heroin addicts do outgrow their addictions, but those who do not "should be treated as victims of a chronic disease". At the 1957 Newport Jazz Festival, he organized one of the first public forums to discuss drug use among jazz musicians, chaired by Nat Hentoff and including Dizzy Gillespie and Duke Ellington as panelists. This forum led to the creation with John Hammond (record producer) of the Musicians Clinic to provide treatment. Dr. Winick and Hentoff's survey of 409 jazz musicians at the 1957 Festival found that 53% had tried heroin, 24% were occasional users, and 16% were regular users of heroin, while 82% had tried marijuana, 54% were occasional users, and 24% were regular users of marijuana

His 1971 book The Lively Commerce, co-authored by Paul M. Kinsie, a study of prostitution based on interviews with 2,000 prostitutes over a ten-year period, found that three-quarters of a sampling of call girls had attempted suicide. The authors found that 15% of all suicides brought to public hospitals in the U.S. were prostitutes. The book also tracked the growth of homosexual and transvestite prostitution. It found that brothels and "madams" (female brothel owners) had largely become a thing of the past, and that though prostitution was a $1 billion-a-year industry, prostitutes were paid little more than clerical workers, earning $5,000 to $6,000 in 1971 dollars as annual net income for a six-day workweek.

Winick was also among the first jury consultants, using tools of sociology to advise lawyers on jury selection. Among the cases that he advised were those of Jean Harris and Claus von Bulow, both accused murderers, and many First Amendment cases.

He also authored Dictionary of Anthropology (1956).

== Personal life ==
Winick married to Mariann Pezzella (d. 2006), with whom he authored a number of books and articles. They had two children, Raphael and Laura Winick. Winick died in New York City on July 4, 2015, at the age of 92.
