= Guillermo Jullian de la Fuente =

Chilean architect (1931–2008)

- Born: November 1931; Valparaíso, Chile
- Died: March 21, 2008 (aged 76); Santiago, Chile
- Education: Pontifical Catholic University of Valparaíso
- Occupation: Architect

Guillermo Jullian de la Fuente (November 1931 – March 21, 2008) was a Chilean architect and painter. After finishing his studies of architecture at the Pontifical Catholic University of Valparaíso, Jullian left his country for Europe, with the declared desire to work with the Swiss architect Le Corbusier.

== Biography ==
Guillermo Jullian de la Fuente was born in November 1931 in Valparaíso, Chile. Together with his wife, he visited the Le Corbusier's works throughout Europe, before settling in Paris in 1958. There, he wrote a letter to Le Corbusier where he told him about Valparaíso and he declared his admiration for his work, asking him for work at his atelier. After a short exchange of letters, Jullian started working at the rue de Sèvres atelier in 1959, where he would stay until his master's death in 1965. After Le Corbusier fired all his previous collaborators, Jullian was his only employee for six months, until others started to arrive there. As chef de bureau at the atelier, Jullian collaborated in such landmark projects as Harvard University's Carpenter Center, the Knowledge Museum at Chandigargh, the Olivetti Laboratories, the Baghdad Stadium, the French embassy in Brasília, and the Venice Hospital. The latter project played an important role in the Team 10 discourse and is one of the clearest examples of mat-building typology and of the structuralist thinking in architecture. In some of these works, like the Olivetti Laboratories, the Carpenter Center and the Venice Hospital, Jullian's participation was more relevant than that of a simple collaborator, and he has been identified as a co-author.

When Le Corbusier died in August 1965, Jullian de la Fuente was in charge of the Venice's atelier, working on the second version of the Hospital project. After the Parisian atelier's dismantling, he established his own practice, Atelier Jullian, located at the Daguerre street in Paris, where he kept working with some of the last Le Corbusier's collaborators, like José Oubrerie and others. He was commissioned to complete the Venice building, but the project was eventually abandoned by the city government in 1972. His studio went on to design a fairground facility in Valencia (1969) and the French Embassy (1978–1984) in Rabat, Morocco's capital. In the mid-1980s, Jullian de la Fuente moved to the United States where he opened a new office with Ann Pendleton in 1987. The Atelier Jullian and Pendleton designed a number of important projects including astronomer Carl Sagan's home in Ithaca, New York. Jullian taught at numerous universities in the US including University of Kentucky, Harvard, Cornell and the University of Pennsylvania.

After a 17-year period of living in the United States, Jullian returned to Chile at age 73. While staying in Chile, he received the commission to what would be his last residential project, Maison Mars. In order to take charge of this project, he decided to settle in Santiago, where he started to teach in several universities. He died on March 21, 2008 in Santiago, Chile, of heart failure.

== Bibliography ==
- Pérez de Arce. Rodrigo, Guillermo Jullian: Obra Abierta, Ediciones ARQ, 2000
- Sarkis, Hashim. Le Corbusier's Venice Hospital, Prestel Verlag, 2001
- Several authors. Massilia 2007. Annuaire d'etudes Corbuseennes, edited by ARQ and Associació d'idees, Santiago and Barcelona, 2007

== Works, projects and collaborations ==
In collaboration with Le Corbusier

- Venice Hospital (project), Venice, Italy
- Carpenter Center for the Visual Arts Harvard University, Cambridge, Massachusetts, United States
- Congress Palace (project), Strasbourg, France
- Knowledge Museum (project), Chandigarh, India
- Baghdad Stadium (project), Iraq
- Olivetti Electronic Calculus Laboratories (project), Rho, Lombardy, Italy
- Le Corbusier Pavilion (Heidi Weber Museum), Zurich, Switzerland
- French Embassy (project), Brasília, Brazil

Atelier Jullian

- Atelier rue Daguerre, Paris, France
- French Embassy, Rabat, Morocco
- French Embassy Brasília, Brazil
- Residences for the French Embassy, Tunisia
- Congress Hall and Fairgrounds, Valencia, Spain
- French Embassy (project), Washington, D.C., United States
- Attic BBC, Lyon, France
- Parking Structure Renault, Boulogne-Billancourt, France
- Mars House, Marbella, Chile

Atelier Jullian and Pendleton

- Sagan House, Ithaca, New York, United States
- Vicuña House, Zapallar, Chile
- Loubejac House, Colina, Chile
- Chilean Parliament Building Competition (project), Valparaíso, Chile
