= Fund for the Republic =

CSDI

- Formation: 1951
- Headquarters: New York City, United States
- President: Robert M. Hutchins
- Key people: Wilbur Hugh Ferry; Clifford P. Case; Clinton Rossiter
- Revenue: Ford Foundation (funder)

The Fund for the Republic (1951–1959) was an organization created by the Ford Foundation and dedicated to protecting freedom of speech and other civil liberties in the United States. In 1959, the Fund moved from New York City to Santa Barbara, California, and changed its name to the Center for the Study of Democratic Institutions (CSDI).

== History ==
With the growth of McCarthyism and the Second Red Scare, the subject of communism in America began to loom large in the public consciousness. In 1951, Robert M. Hutchins became the president of the Ford Foundation's Fund for the Republic, a non-profit organization whose basic objectives were to research and analyze civil liberties and civil rights. In August 1953, Clifford P. Case resigned from the United States House of Representatives to become president of the Fund replacing Hutchins. He served in that position until March 1954. Also in 1954, Wilbur Hugh Ferry became Fund vice president, responsible for administration and public relations, and moved with the Fund to Santa Barbara in 1959.

Walter Millis, former editorial and staff writer for the New York Herald Tribune (1924–1954), became a staff member of the Fund for the Republic (1954–1968).

Bethuel M. Webster served as legal counsel to the Fund and represented the Fund in hearings before the notorious Un-American Activities Committee of the House of Representatives (HUAC). During this period he also defended William Remington, an economist and alleged Communist accused of espionage.

Political scientist Clinton Rossiter of Cornell University served as series editor for "Communism in American Life," published by the Fund. The aim was a full-scale history of American communism. It engaged David A. Shannon of the University of Wisconsin to write the history of the Communist Party USA during the post-war period. In 1952, it engaged Theodore Draper to write a monograph on the party's early years. Draper had already been thinking of writing a "traditional" history of the Party, based upon documentary sources and meeting scholarly standards. In 1954, Millis became the director of the Fund's study of demilitarization. Robert W. Iversen wrote a book for the fund called Communism and the Schools, published in 1959.

Other fellows and grant recipients include Rev. Glenn E. Smiley et al. for Martin Luther King and the Montgomery Story (1957), David Fellman (1957–1958), and Norman St John-Stevas (1958).

== Trustees ==
- Edward Lamb
- Frederick M. Nicholas

== Awards ==
In 1956, the Fund may have set up the Robert E. Sherwood Award, given to Jerome Coopersmith for writing the episode "I Was Accused" (based on the true story of actor George Voskovec, interned at Ellis Island during days of McCarthyism.

== Publications ==
- Report on Blacklisting: I. Movies by John Cogley (1956)
- Report on Blacklisting: II. Radio-Television by John Cogley (1956)
- The Roots of American Communism by Theodore Draper (1957)
- Economic Power and the Free Society by Adolf A. Berle (1957)
- American Civil Liberties in the Foreign Press: A Study Conducted Under the Auspices of the Association for Education in Journalism, with Financial Support from the Fund for the Republic by Douglas Waples (1957)
- Communism and the Schools by Robert W. Iversen (1959)
- The Art of Government: Reform and Organization Politics in Philadelphia by James Reichly (1959)
- A New Philosophy for Labor by Gus Tyler (1959)
- Taste and the Censor in Television by Charles Winick (1959)
- The Corporation and the Economy by Wilbur Hugh Ferry (1959)
- American Communism and Soviet Russia by Theodore Draper (1960)
- Medicine: An Interview by Donald McDonald with Herbert Ratner, M.D. (1962)
- The Economy Under Law by Wilbur Hugh Ferry (1961)
- Caught in the Horn of Plenty by Wilbur Hugh Ferry (1962)
- What Price Peace by Wilbur Hugh Ferry (1963)
- How the United States Got Involved in Vietnam by Robert Scheer (1965)
- Masscom as Educator by Wilbur Hugh Ferry (1966)
- Farewell to Integration by Wilbur Hugh Ferry (1967)
- Tonic and Toxic Technology by Wilbur Hugh Ferry (1967)
- The Police State is Here by Wilbur Hugh Ferry (1969)
- The Center Magazine Volume IX Number 4 (July/August 1976)

== External sources ==
- Reeves, Thomas C. (1969). Freedom and the Foundation: The Fund for the Republic in the Era of McCarthyism. Knopf. ISBN 9780307828897.
- Kelly, Frank K. (1981). Court of Reason – Robert Hutchins and the Fund for the Republic. Free Press. ISBN 9780029180303.
- Fund for the Republic Records at Princeton University Library Special Collections
