= Carpenter Center for the Visual Arts =

Visual arts center at Harvard University

- Carpenter Center for the Visual Arts
- U.S. National Register of Historic Places
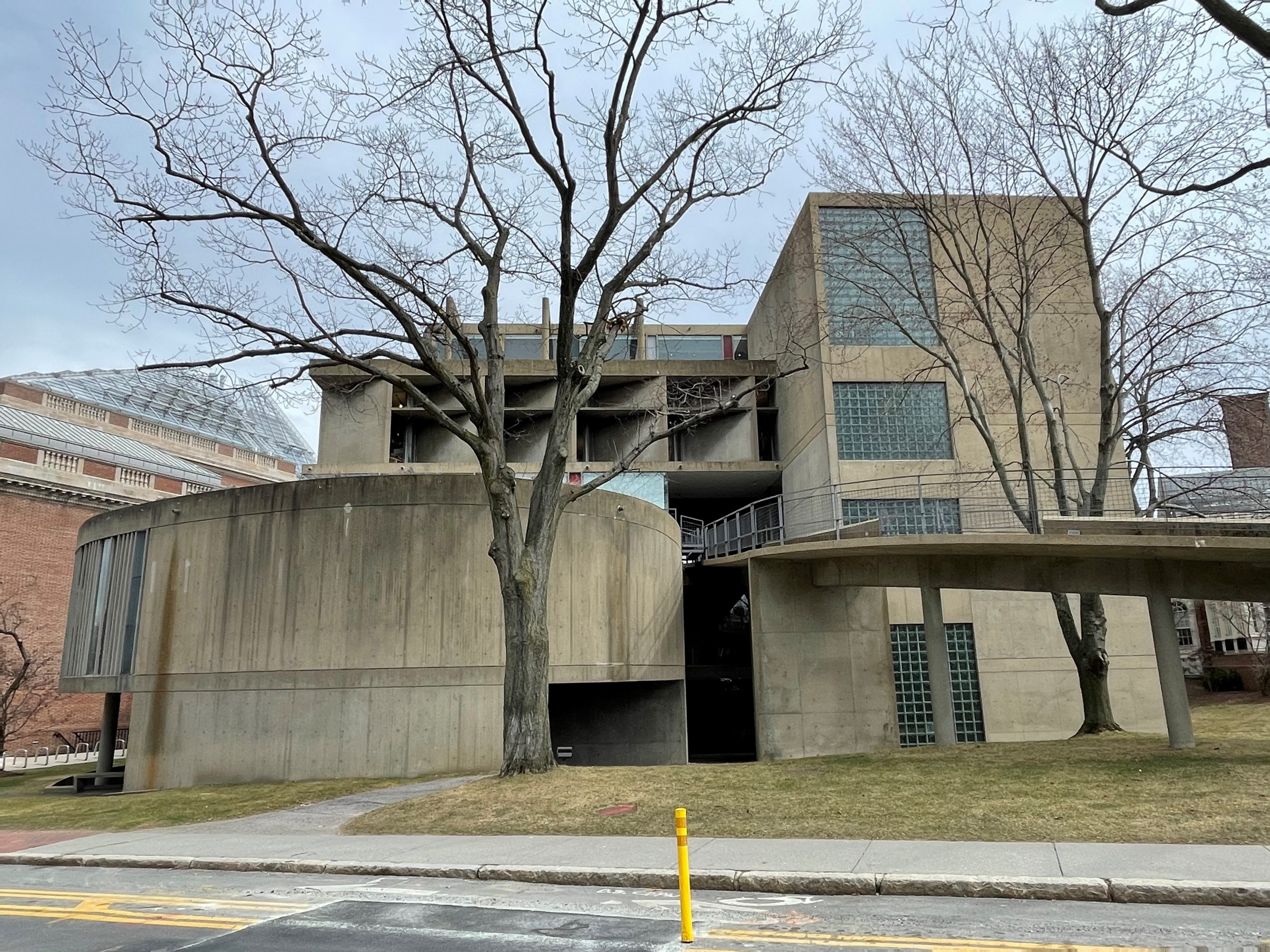
- View looking east from Quincy Street
- Location: Cambridge, Massachusetts
- Coordinates: 42°22′25.0″N 71°6′51.5″W
- Built: 1962
- Architect: Le Corbusier
- Architectural style: Modern
- Website: carpenter.center
- NRHP reference No.: 78000435
- Added to NRHP: April 20, 1978

The Carpenter Center for the Visual Arts at Harvard University, in Cambridge, Massachusetts, is the only building designed primarily by Le Corbusier in the United States—he contributed to the design of the United Nations Secretariat Building—and one of only two in the Americas (the other being the Curutchet House in La Plata, Argentina). Le Corbusier designed it with the collaboration of Chilean architect Guillermo Jullian de la Fuente at his 35 rue de Sèvres studio; the on-site preparation of the construction plans was handled by the office of Josep Lluís Sert, then dean of the Harvard Graduate School of Design. He had formerly worked in Le Corbusier's atelier and had been instrumental in winning him the commission. The building was completed in 1962.

== Commission ==
During the mid-1950s, the idea of creating a place for the visual arts at Harvard began to take shape. A new department dedicated to the visual arts was created, and the need for a building to house the new department arose. A budget was set for $1.3 million, and the proposal was included in a Harvard fundraising program. The project immediately elicited a response from Harvard alumnus Alfred St. Vrain Carpenter, A.B. 1905, and his wife Helen Bundy Carpenter. The couple, whose son Harlow had just attended the Harvard Graduate School of Design, donated $1.5 million for the proposed design center. The donation propelled the project forward, and the Committee for the Practice of Visual Arts began to look for an architect to undertake the project. Originally, the committee had recommended that the building be designed by "a first rate American architect" who would be in the company of Charles Bulfinch and Walter Gropius, among others. However, José Luis Sert, who was at the time Dean of the Graduate School of Design and chairman of the committee suggested that his friend and previous collaborator, Le Corbusier, be asked to design the building. Delayed due to scheduling and payment conflicts, Le Corbusier eventually accepted and made his first of two visits to Cambridge in 1959.

== Design and construction ==
Because the Carpenter Center was to be his only building in America, Le Corbusier felt it should be a synthesis of his architectural principles and therefore incorporated his Five Points into its design. He took it as a particular challenge, determined that it should make a positive impact both on its surroundings—Georgian style houses—and in its mode of operation. He proposed to take pedestrians from all parts of the campus through the building, so that even though they might not be intending to visit it, they would see and thus partake in the artistic activities going on within it.

After much debate, a site was chosen between Quincy and Prescott Streets, abiding by the original proposal for the building. The allotted space was quite small, so the completed building presents itself as a compact, roughly cylindrical mass bisected by an S-shaped ramp on the third floor. Le Corbusier's earliest design showed a much more pronounced ramp that further separated the two parts of the central mass. However, the early design created the problem of too much disruption of the central mass. This problem auditorium reconciled by using a pinwheel effect so that in the finally executed design, the two halves meet at a vertical core that houses an elevator. The concrete ramp is cantilevered from this central spine and stands atop a few pilotis. The landing at the top of the ramp is located in the core of the building and leads to various studios and exhibition spaces seen through glass windows and doors, providing views into the building's instructional and displaying functions without interrupting the activities in progress.

The exterior of the Carpenter Center presents itself very differently from different angles. From Prescott Street looking toward the curved studio space, one can see the brise-soleil that are placed perpendicular to the direction of the central portion of the ramp, making only their narrow ends visible from the street. The Quincy Street view, however, reveals ondulatoires on this studio's exterior curve, which interfere with the building's curve less than the brise-soleil do on the opposite side. On the ramp from Quincy street just before entering the building, one sees grids of square and rectangles of the windows, brise-soleils, and studio spaces, rather than the curves of the two halves of the building.

Exterior views of the Carpenter Center
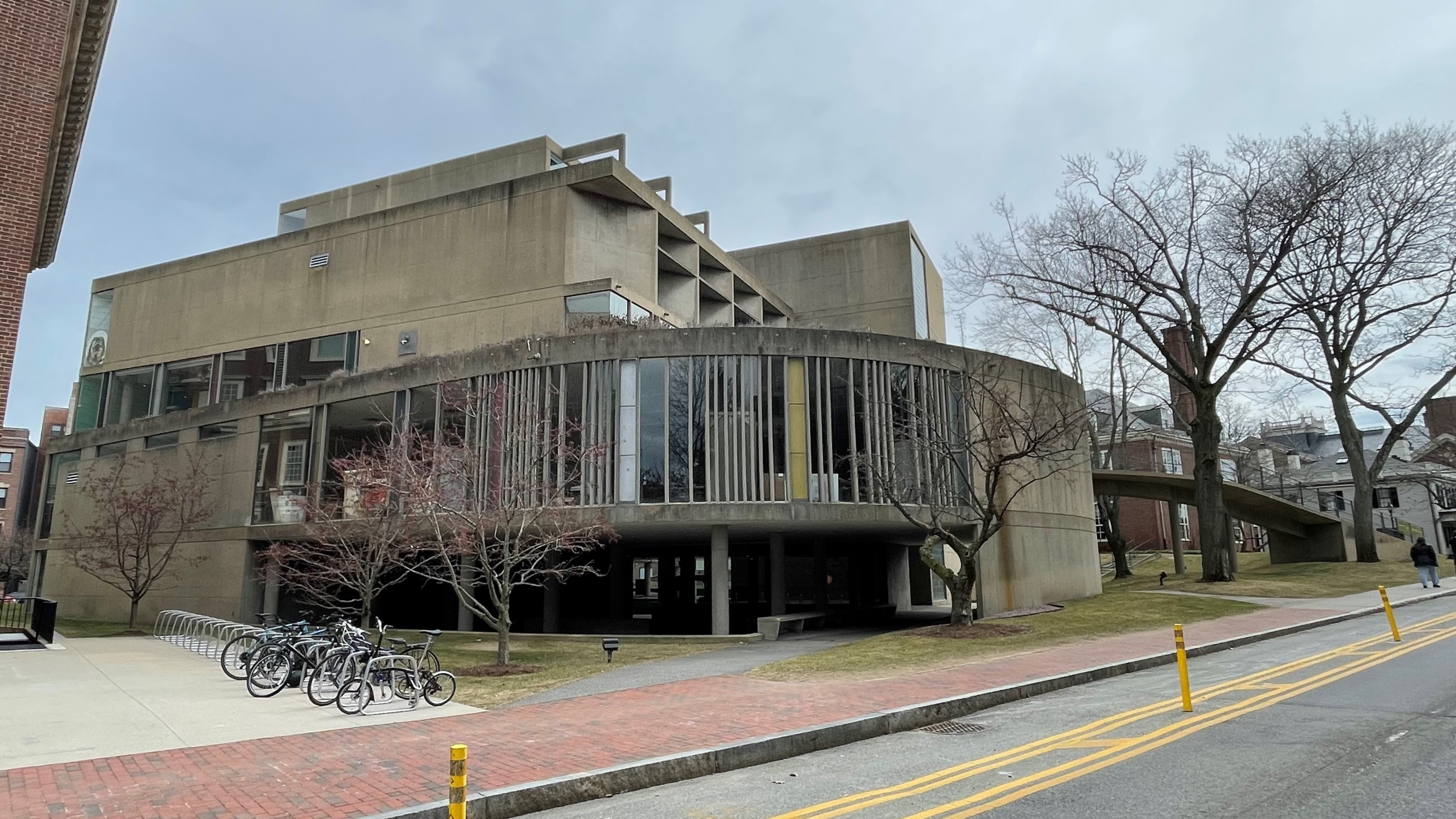
View facing southeast

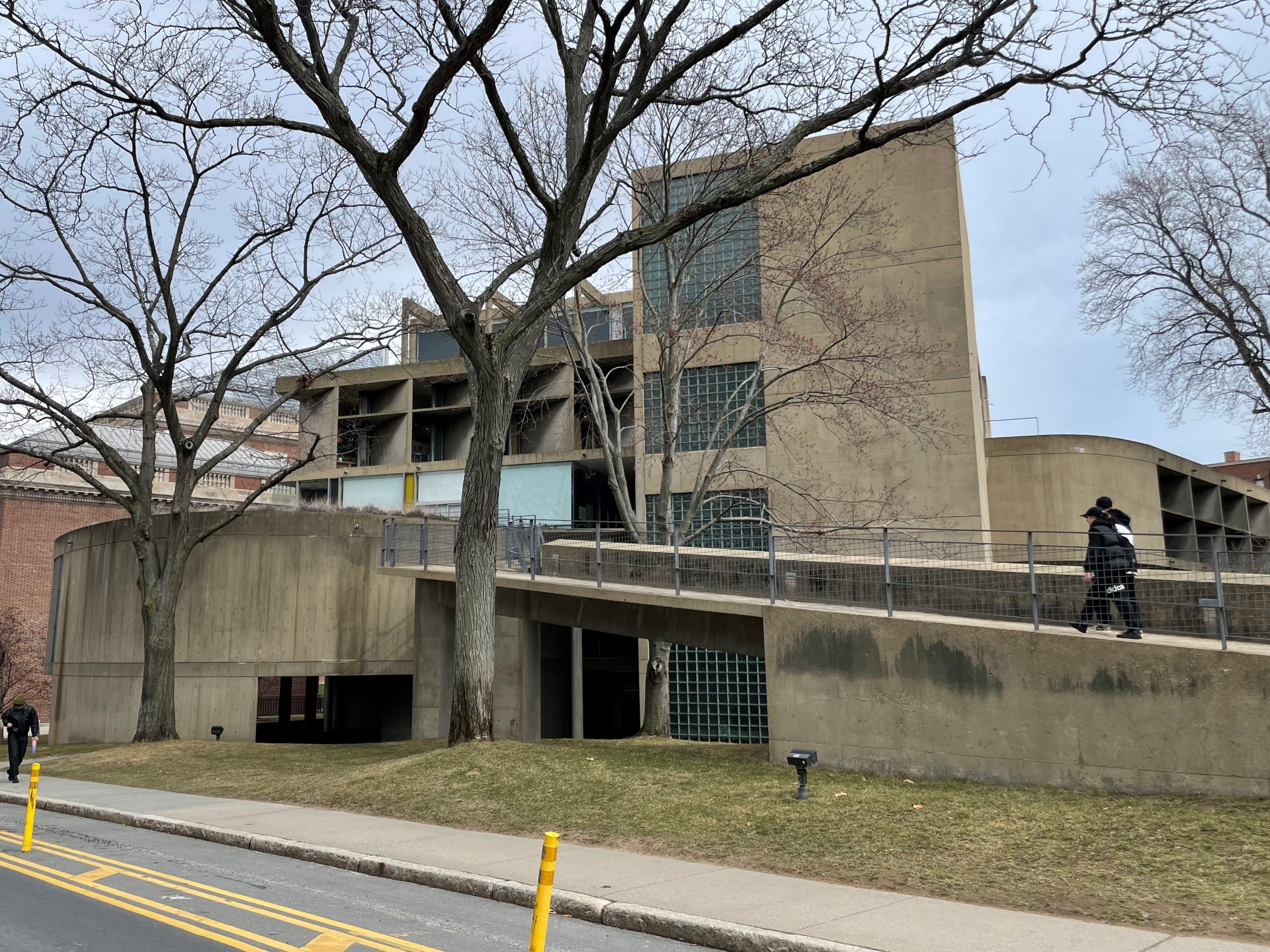
View facing northeast

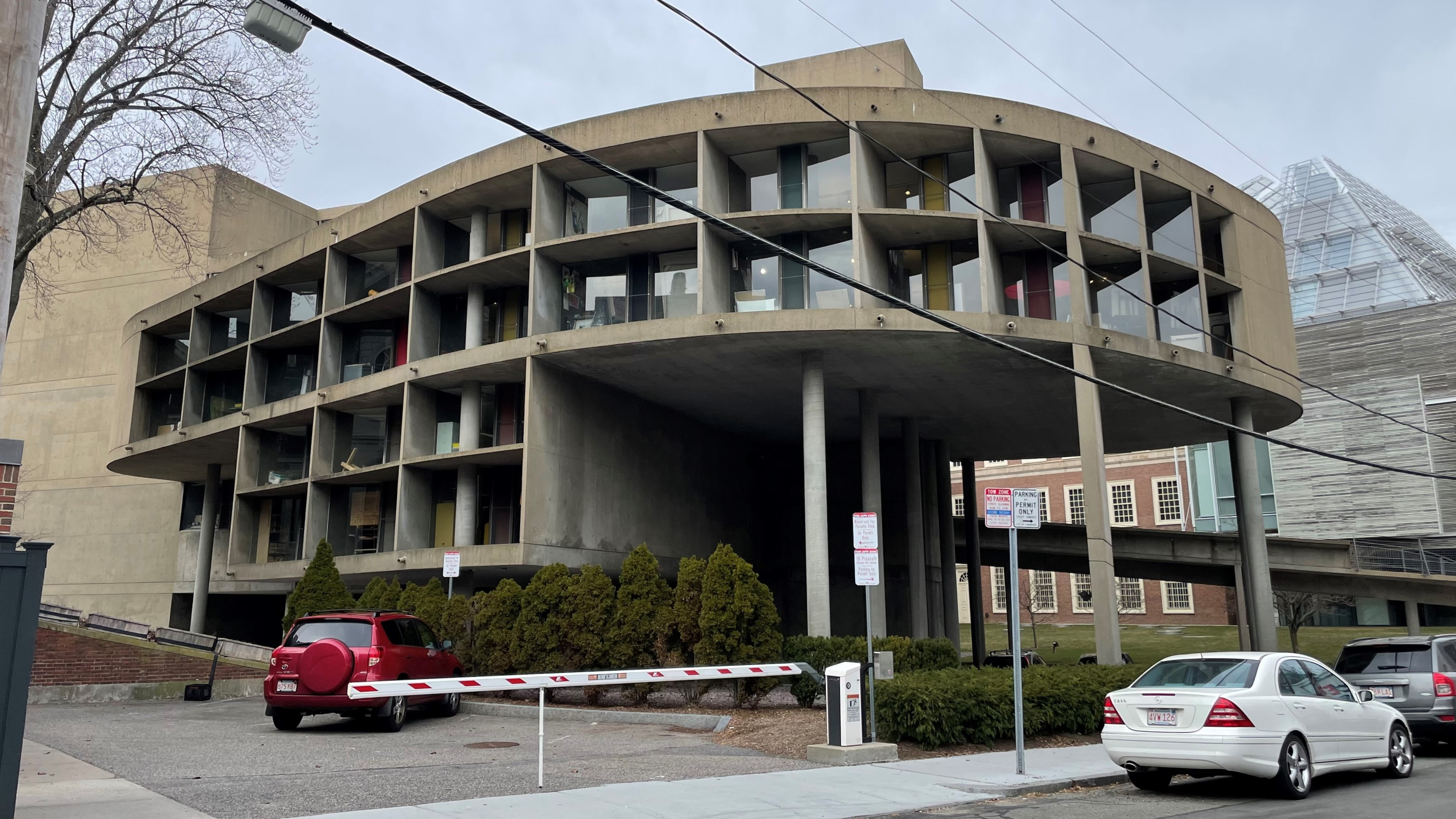
View facing northwest

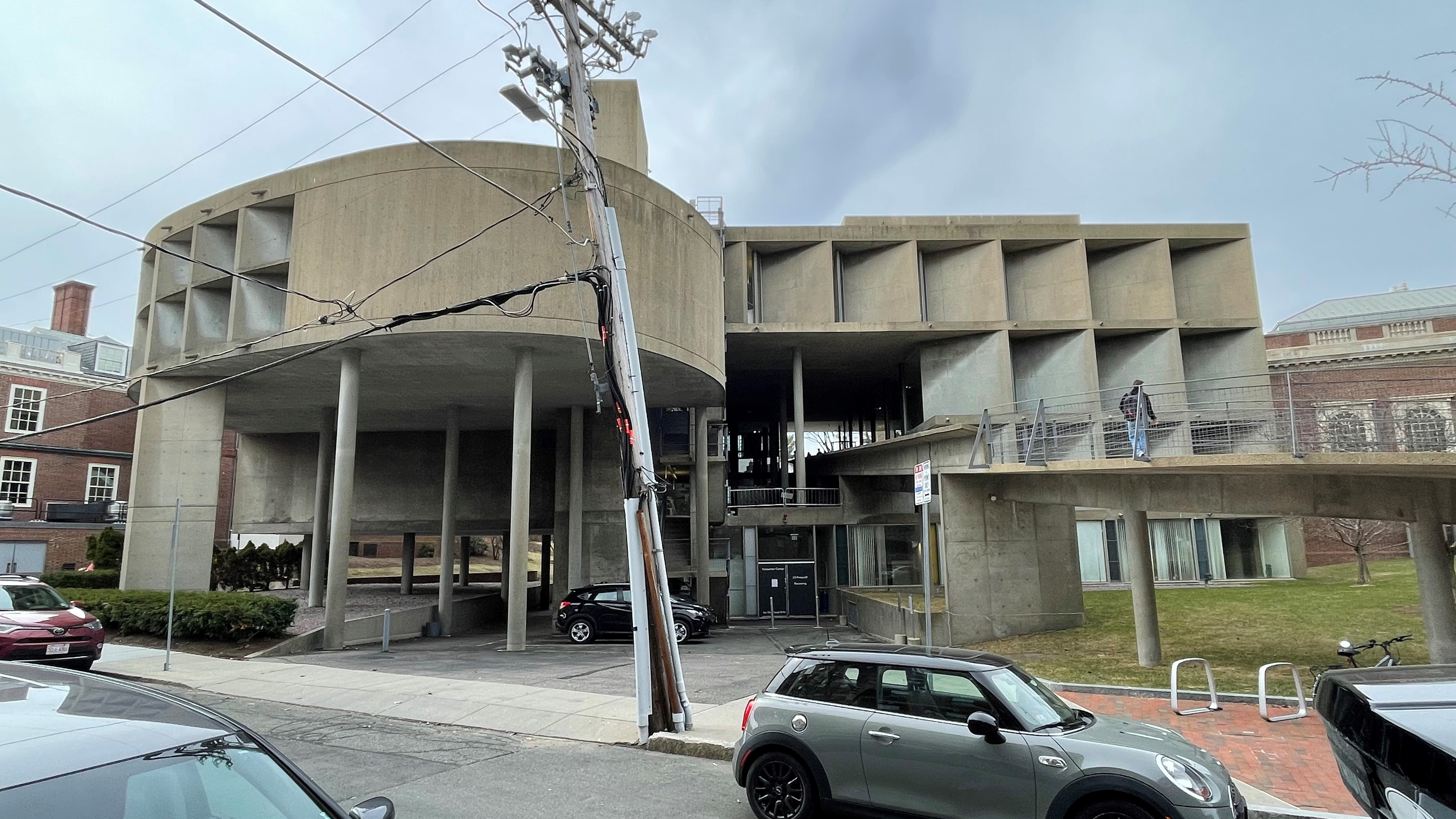
View facing west

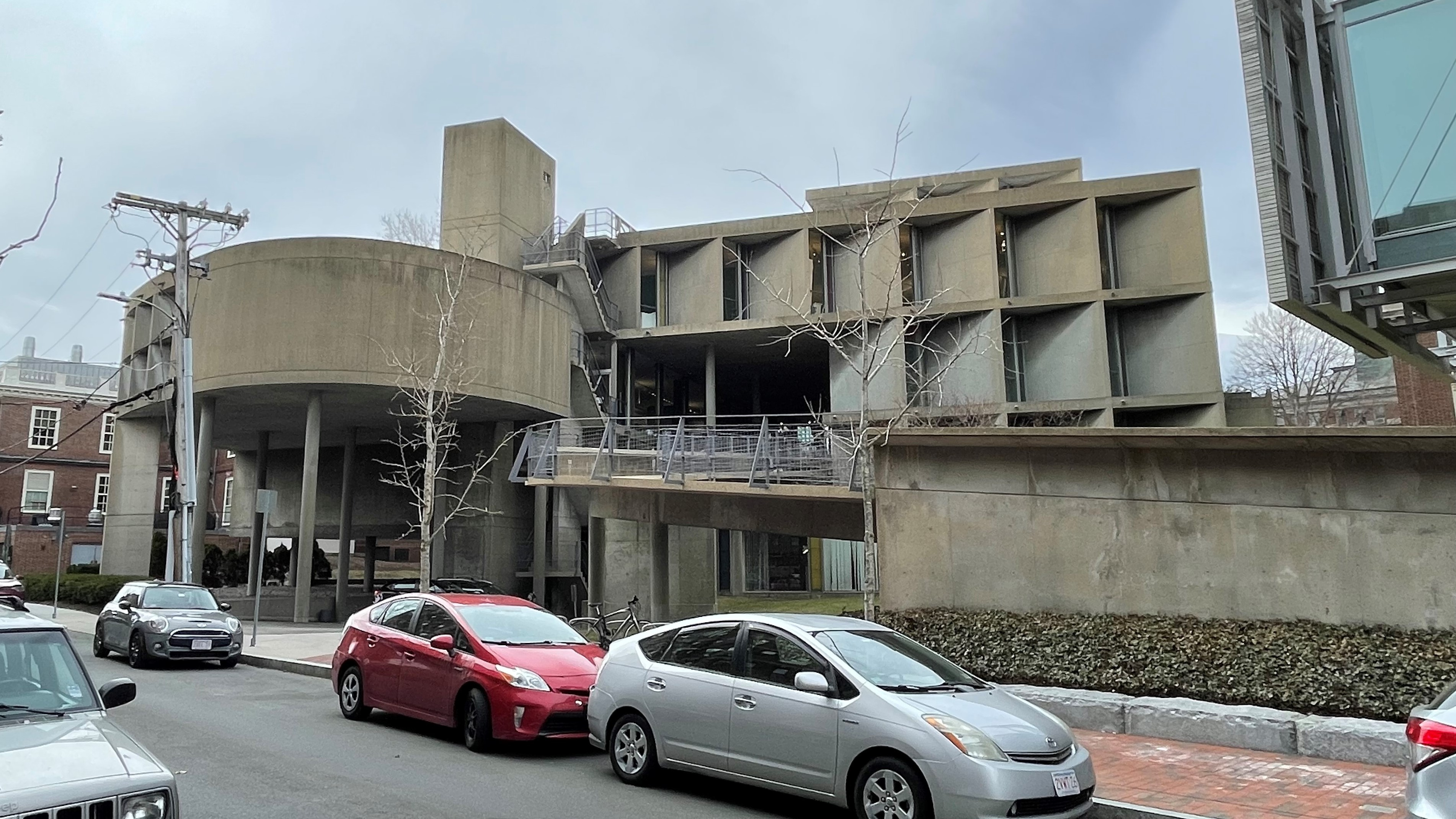
View facing southwest as walkway connects to the Harvard Art Museums's expansion

== Later history ==
The building now houses the Carpenter Center for the Visual Arts, the Department of Art, Film, and Visual Studies (formerly Visual and Environmental Studies) of the university, and is the venue for screenings by the Harvard Film Archive.

Le Corbusier never actually saw the building. He was invited to the opening ceremony, but he declined the invitation on account of his poor health.

The French artist Pierre Huyghe explored the creation of the building in his 2004 work This Is Not A Time For Dreaming.

== See also ==
- National Register of Historic Places listings in Cambridge, Massachusetts
