= Clinton Rossiter =

American political scientist (1917–1970)

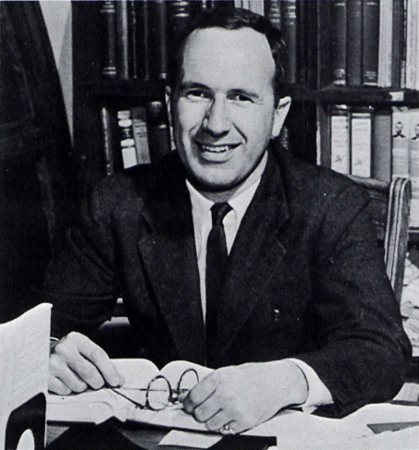
- Rossiter, c. 1965
- Born: Clinton Lawrence Rossiter III; September 18, 1917; Philadelphia, Pennsylvania, U.S.
- Died: July 11, 1970 (aged 52); Ithaca, New York, U.S.
- Education: Westminster preparatory school
- Alma mater: Cornell University (AB); Princeton University (Ph.D)
- Occupations: Historian, political scientist, professor at Cornell University
- Spouse: Mary Ellen Crane Rossiter

Clinton Lawrence Rossiter III (September 18, 1917 – July 11, 1970) was an American historian and political scientist at Cornell University (1947–1970) who wrote The American Presidency, among 20 other books, and won both the Bancroft Prize and the Woodrow Wilson Foundation Award for his book Seedtime of the Republic.

== Early life and education ==
Rossiter was born on September 18, 1917, in Philadelphia, Pennsylvania. His parents were Winton Goodrich Rossiter, a stockbroker, and Dorothy Shaw. Clinton grew up in Bronxville, New York, the third of four siblings: Dorothy Ann Rossiter, William Winton, Goodrich Rossiter, Clinton, and Joan Rossiter. He was raised to give priority to family and social expectations.

Rossiter attended Westminster preparatory school in Simsbury, Connecticut, and then attended Cornell University, where he graduated Phi Beta Kappa in 1939 and was a member of the Quill and Dagger society.

In 1942, Princeton University awarded him a Ph.D. for his thesis Constitutional Dictatorship: Crisis Government in the Modern Democracies.

== Career ==
Immediately after American entry into World War II, Rossiter joined the United States Naval Reserves and served for three years as a gunnery officer, mostly on the USS Alabama in the Pacific Theater, reaching the rank of lieutenant.

Rossiter taught briefly at the University of Michigan in 1946, moving to Cornell University in 1947, where he rose from instructor to full professor in eight years.

He served as the chair of the Government Department from 1956 to 1959, when he was named John L. Senior Professor of American Institutions.

During the 1950s, Rossiter served as series editor for "Communism in American Life," published by the fund for the Republic, a nonprofit organization funded by the Ford Foundation.

He spent the 1960–1961 academic year as Pitt Professor of American History and Institutions at Cambridge University, England.

== Personal life ==
Rossiter married Mary Ellen Crane in September 1947. They had three sons, each of whom were Cornell University graduates: David Goodrich Rossiter (1949), Caleb Stewart Rossiter (1951) (Caleb also attended Westminster), and Winton Goodrich Rossiter (1954).

== Death ==
Rossiter died in his home in Ithaca, New York, on July 11, 1970, at age 52. The New York Times reported that his son Caleb Rossiter discovered his father's body in the home's basement. The cause of death was ruled a suicide by the Tompkins County, New York medical examiner and was widely reported.

Years after Rossiter's death, his son revealed that his father suffered a lifetime of debilitating clinical depression, which he could no longer extract himself from and overdosed on sleeping pills.

External events had much to do with Rossiter's final stages of depression. His beloved Cornell University was convulsed with racial conflict, including the occupation of the student union building in April 1969. In response, Rossiter became prominent as a moderate voice among Cornell University faculty, urging some understanding of the African American students' frustrations, but he was branded a traitor by other faculty members, some of whom, including Allan Bloom, refused to speak to him again.

== Legacy ==
For two decades after Rossiter's death, the academic mainstream in political science moved away from Rossiter's documentary, interpretative style, towards a quantitative, data-driven approach. However, in the 1990s and the early 21st century, political scientists have rediscovered the substantive and methodological concerns that Rossiter brought to his work and have found a renewed appreciation for his scholarly works.

In particular, following the events of 9/11, Rossiter's first book, the 1948 Constitutional Dictatorship: Crisis Government in the Modern Democracies (reissued in 1963 with a new preface), was reprinted for the first time in nearly forty years. In that germinal study, Rossiter argued that constitutional democracies had to learn the lesson of the Roman Republic to adopt and use emergency procedures that would empower governments to deal with crises beyond the ordinary capacities of democratic constitutional governance but to ensure that such crisis procedures were themselves subject to constitutional controls and codified temporal limits.

His 1787: The Grand Convention is still hailed as among the very best accounts of the Federal Convention and the making of the Constitution.

Although much has changed in American politics since 1970, especially the meanings of important (but constantly changing) terms like "conservative" and "liberal", his book on that ideologically charged subject remains a classic articulation (along with Louis Hartz's "The Liberal Tradition in America") of the integrity that words like liberalism and conservatism still have.

His edition of The Federalist Papers continues to be used as a standard text in high schools and colleges, but in the late 1990s, the publisher of that edition replaced Rossiter's introduction and analytic table of contents with a new introduction by Charles R. Kesler and a table of contents derived from Henry Cabot Lodge's 1898 edition. Rossiter's article, "A Revolution to Conserve," has been used to introduce generations of high school students to the origins of the American Revolution.

His 1964 monograph, Alexander Hamilton and the Constitution, studies the evolution and current relevance of Hamilton's political and constitutional thought, and his 1953 Bancroft Prize-winning Seedtime of the Republic investigates the roots of American thinking about politics and government in the years leading up to the American Revolution.

== Major publications ==
=== Books ===
- Constitutional dictatorship : crisis government in the modern democracies; Princeton : Princeton University Press; (1948); Republished New York, Harcourt, Brace & World (1963); Republished Westport, Conn.: Greenwood Press; (1979); Republished New Brunswick, N.J.: Transaction Publishers; (2002); online
  - Review: Hans J. Morgenthau, American Journal of Sociology, vol. 54, no. 6 (May, 1949), pp. 566–67
- Documents in American Government; New York, W. Sloane Associates; (1949)
- The Supreme Court and the commander in Chief; Ithaca, Cornell University Press; (1951); Republished New York, Da Capo Press; (1970); Republished Ithaca, N.Y.: Cornell University Press; (1976)
- Seedtime of the Republic : the origin of the American tradition of political liberty; New York: Harcourt, Brace; (1953) online part 2
- Conservatism in America; New York : Knopf; (1955) Republished Cambridge, Mass.: Harvard University Press; (1982)
  - second revised edition published as Conservatism in America; the thankless persuasion; New York: Knopf and New York: Vintage Books (1962); Republished Westport, Conn.: Greenwood Press; (1981)
- "The First American Revolution" analyzes the American colonies on the eve of the Revolutionary War, focusing on their political, social, and intellectual landscape. It examines the period from 1763 to the start of the war, exploring the factors that led to colonial resistance against British rule. The book delves into the development of colonial self-government, the influence of Enlightenment ideas, and the growing sense of American identity. [B001FYSO4E] Publisher Harcourt, Brace (1956)
- The American Presidency; New York: Harcourt, Brace; (1956) online
- Marxism: the view from America; New York: Harcourt, Brace; (1960) online
- Parties and politics in America; Ithaca, N.Y.: Cornell University Press; (1960)
- The American Presidency; New York: Harcourt, Brace; (1956); Republished New York: Harcourt, Brace; (1960); Republished New York: Time Inc. (1963); Republished Baltimore: Johns Hopkins University Press; (1987)
- The Federalist papers; Alexander Hamilton, James Madison, John Jay; New York New American Library (1961); Republished New York: Mentor;(1999)
- The three pillars of United States Government: the Presidency, the Congress, the Supreme Court; Washington, Distributed by U.S. Information Service; (1962)
- The political thought of the American Revolution; New York: Harcourt, Brace & World; (1963)
- Six characters in search of a Republic: studies in the political thought of the American colonies; New York: Harcourt, Brace & World (1964)
- Alexander Hamilton and the Constitution; New York: Harcourt, Brace & World; (1964) online
- 1787: the grand Convention; New York: Macmillan; (1966); Republished New York: W.W. Norton, (1987) online
- The American quest, 1790–1860: an emerging nation in search of identity, unity, and modernity; New York: Harcourt Brace Jovanovich (1971) online

=== Articles ===
- "The President and Labor Disputes". The Journal of Politics Vol. 11, No. 1; Feb 1949, pp. 93–120.
- "Instruction and Research: Political Science 1 and Indoctrination"; The American Political Science Review; Vol. 42, No. 3; Jun 1948, pp. 542–49
- "The Reform of the Vice-Presidency"; Political Science Quarterly; Vol. 63, No. 3; Sep 1948, pp. 383–403
- "A Political Philosophy of F.D. Roosevelt: A Challenge to Scholarship"; The Review of Politics; Vol. 11, No. 1; Jan 1949, pp. 87–95
- "John Wise: Colonial Democrat"; The New England Quarterly; Vol. 22, No. 1; Mar 1949, pp. 3–32
- "Constitutional Dictatorship in the Atomic Age"; The Review of Politics, Vol. 11, No. 4; Oct 1949, pp. 395–418
- "What of Congress in Atomic War"; The Western Political Quarterly; Vol. 3, No. 4; Dec 1950, pp. 602–06
- "The Political Theory of the American Revolution"; The Review of Politics; Vol. 15, No. 1; Jan 1953, pp. 97–108
- "Impact of Mobilization on the Constitutional System"; Proceedings of the Academy of Political Science, Vol. 30, No. 3; May 1971, pp. 60–67

== See also ==
- Fund for the Republic
