= Interreligious Foundation for Community Organization =

International religious community

The Interreligious Foundation for Community Organization is an international religious community whose stated aim is to ensure justice for the oppressed peoples of the world. IFCO was founded in 1967, originally by the United Presbyterian Church. The IFCO has a controversial history due in part to "its funding of community groups involved in militant and protest activities."

Through the affiliated project Pastors for Peace, IFCO works in Cuba, Mexico, Haiti, and other nations of Central America and the Caribbean.
