= Peace Development Fund =

US non-profit organization

- Formation: January 1, 1981
- Founder: Bob Mazer and Meg Gage
- Type: Human rights and social justice
- Location: Amherst, Massachusetts
- Region served: Global
- Website: www.peacedevelopmentfund.org

The Peace Development Fund is a 501(c)3 non-profit public foundation, based in Amherst, Massachusetts. As of 2025 they hold US$10,819,884 in assets, with annual expenses of US$3,086,768, of which US$2,339,110 went to grants and US$532,390 to salaries.

The Fund's mission statement describes it as working "to build the capacity of community-based organizations through grants, training, and other resources as partners in the human rights and social justice movements.

The fund was co-founded in 1981 by Bob Mazer and Meg Gage, and originally focused on funding grassroots anti-nuclear organizations. They soon expanded to fund groups opposing the Reagan administration's policies in Central America, and later to low-income community organizing not necessarily related to war-and-peace issues. This last led to a broadened board of directors: as Meg Gage put it in 2007, "...to build a strong peace and social justice movement, you have to connect with people of color... I'm very proud of the large, diverse board we built."
