= DJB Foundation =

American foundation

The DJB Foundation, a progressive social change philanthropy, was founded in 1948 by Daniel J. Bernstein (1918-1970). With his death in 1970 almost five-million dollars came to the foundation. Its most active period began in 1971 when the board of directors decided that all assets would be given away within ten years. The grants concentrated on groups and programs generally ignored by conventional foundations because they were "controversial" -- to Clergy and Laity Concerned About Vietnam, the poor, GIs, deserters and draft resisters, ethnic groups, African liberation groups, convicts and ex-convicts. The DJB Foundation exhausted the majority of its funds by the end of 1974. It officially closed in December 2008.

== History ==
The DJB Foundation was created in 1948 by Daniel Bernstein as a holding operation for the inheritance received from his father. He continued to work in the stock market to earn a living but he used the foundation funds and his own funds when limited by the tax laws to give to his causes and beliefs. Dan's seat on the NY Stock Exchange gave him an opportunity to support the value of social justice in the American Civil Rights campaign, such as his support for the Historically Black Colleges, and the liberation struggle in Africa in 3 locations: Mozambique, Angola, and South Africa, where he supported people like Ruth Minter (a Union Theol Sem grad. married to the head of Frelimo). Another important justice issue was the War in Vietnam, which he engaged with the Rev Robert M Hundley (also a Union Theol. See grad), where they put what many argue was the single most significant protest against the war by gathering commitments from 587 Student Body Presidents & Student Newspaper Editors to question fighting in a war both Immoral & Illegal, & then with the Clergy & Laity Against the War in Vietnam published 4 page ads twice in all the major Am newspapers. This student group then became the foundation of the McCarthy for President Campaign and the Vietnam Moratorium, holding peaceful protests through 1969.

When Bernstein died in 1970 at the age of 51, approximately $5 million of his estate went to the DJB Foundation. This sum was substantially all of the Foundation's capital, as at his death it had about $100,000. The foundation began its most active period. The Board of the Foundation consisted of four members: Carol Bernstein, his widow; Stephen R. Abrams, Robert S. Browne, and W. H. Ferry, who became Carol's husband in 1973. Vincent F. McGee, Jr., joined the Foundation as its executive staff member in the beginning of 1973.

With its funds virtually exhausted by 1975, the board members of the DJB Foundation more than achieved its ten-year goal of depleting its resources in only four years. The foundation existed on a much smaller scale until 2008, when it officially closed.
