= Agape Foundation =

Agape Foundation Fund for Nonviolent Social Change
- Founded: 1969
- Dissolved: 2010
- Type: Private foundation
- Tax ID no.: 23-7054694
- Purpose: Nonviolence, social justice
- Location: San Francisco, California, United States
- Region served: United States
- Method: Grantmaking

The Agape Foundation Fund for Nonviolent Social Change was a non-profit, public foundation which funded "nonviolent social change organizations committed to peace and justice issues." In 2010, the foundation merged with the Peace Development Fund.

== History ==
Agape Foundation was established in 1969 in Palo Alto, California to finance the activities of organizations opposed to the Vietnam War. Its name, "Agape," was taken from the Greek word meaning "the unselfish love of one person for another." The foundation characterized its founders as "[p]acifists, World War II conscientious objectors, and anti-Vietnam War activists" who sought "to build a movement that seriously challenged the Pentagon and the American culture of violence."

The foundation merged in 2010 with the Peace Development Fund.

== Grantmaking ==
Agape focused its grantmaking primarily on grassroots organizations in the Western United States. The foundation generally did not make grants exceeding $2,000.

In 2004, the Agape Foundation awarded $1.18 million to 61 grassroots, peace and justice organizations, bringing its 35-year grantmaking total to $8.8 million and its total number of grant recipients to more than 700. By 2009 the foundation had raised more than $13 million and provided funding to over 800 organizations.

=== Seed grants ===
The foundation provided seed grants to new, California-based, peace and justice organizations to help them launch or expand their operations. These recipient groups were typically under five years old and had annual budgets of less than $100,000. Agape also made emergency grants to help such organizations "respond to unforeseen governmental, corporate, environmental or military events."

=== Recipients ===
Some of their grant recipients have included:

- American-Arab Anti-Discrimination Committee
- Amnesty International
- Clowns without Borders
- Not In Our Name
- Physicians for Social Responsibility
- Rainforest Action Network
- Ruckus Society
- Tides Foundation and Tides Center
- War Resisters League
- Witness for Peace

== Fiscal sponsorship program ==
Agape's fiscal sponsorship program allowed donors to make tax-deductible contributions to smaller groups in California who did not have their own tax-exempt status.
