= Jeunes Agape =

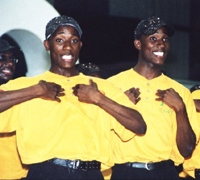
Babtiste brothers singing in Jeunes Agape

Jeunes Agape was a Trinidadian and Tobagonian, musical-drama group. Members included identical twin brothers Deon and Ian Baptiste. Ian (left) was the recipient of Deon's blood donor stem cells in a successful transplant procedure to treat aplastic anemia conducted by the United States National Institutes of Health.

== Discography ==
- Musical Turbulence (2000)
- Trinbago Christmas Lime (Kenny Phillips) (4 songs) (2002).
- Unleashing the Tempo (2005.)

== Trinidad and Tobago National Music Festival Awards ==
- Best Gospel Choir (2004, 2006)
- Best Folk Choir (1995, 1997, 1999, 2002)
- Most Outstanding Folk Choir (1997, 1999, 2002, 2006)
- Best Calypso Chorale (1999, 2002, 2004, 2006)
