= Agape Europe =

Agape Europe is the Western European ministry of Cru, an interdenominational movement that was founded in 1951 in the United States of America. "Agape" is the Greek word used in the Bible for God's unconditional love. Agape became a worldwide organisation as of 2004, and around 20,000 people have joined Agape Europe.

Agape Europe, currently headquartered in Kandern, Germany and Barcelona, Spain, has ministries for students in universities and secondary schools, sports, media, families, communities, churches, musicians, leaders and much more.

== Leadership ==
Agape Europe has been directed by the following leaders:

- Gordon Klenck 1966 - 1977
- Kalevi Lehtinen 1977 - 1987
- Leo Habets 1987 - 1996
- Markku Happonen 1996 - 2006
- Javier García - 2006–present
