= Slope Day =

Tradition at Cornell University

Images of Slope Day at Cornell University, then known as Spring Day, in 1904

Slope Day is an annual day of celebration held at Cornell University, historically held during the last day of regular undergraduate classes, though it has been moved to the following day as of 2014. The Slope Day Programming Board (SDPB) is responsible for organizing the event, selecting artists, and managing the Slope Day's execution. Though Slope Day has gone through many phases, in recent years the focus has shifted to live music and catered food and beverages on the slope on Cornell's primary campus in Ithaca, New York.

== History ==
=== 19th century ===
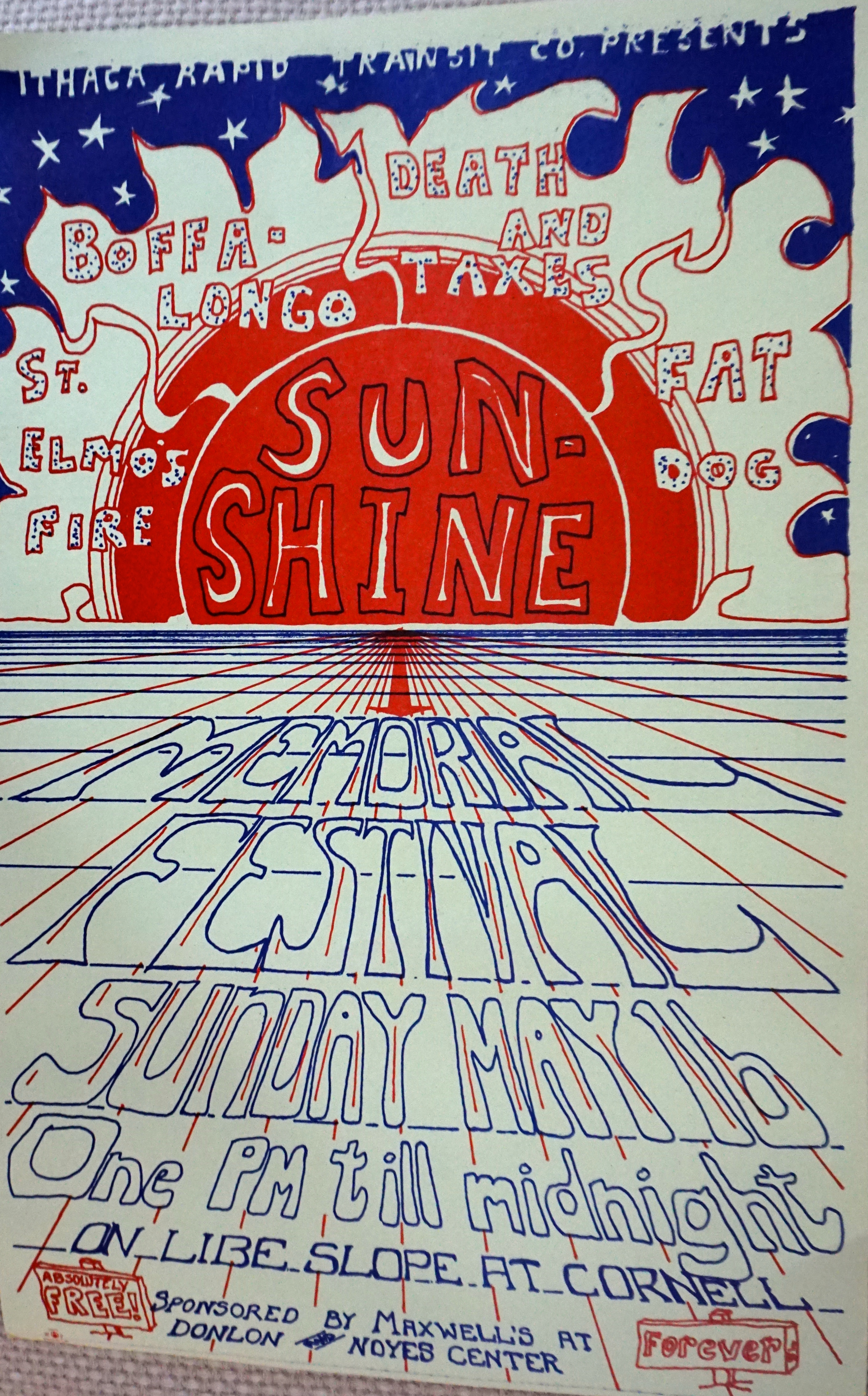
Slope Day 1971, then known as the Sunshine Memorial Festival

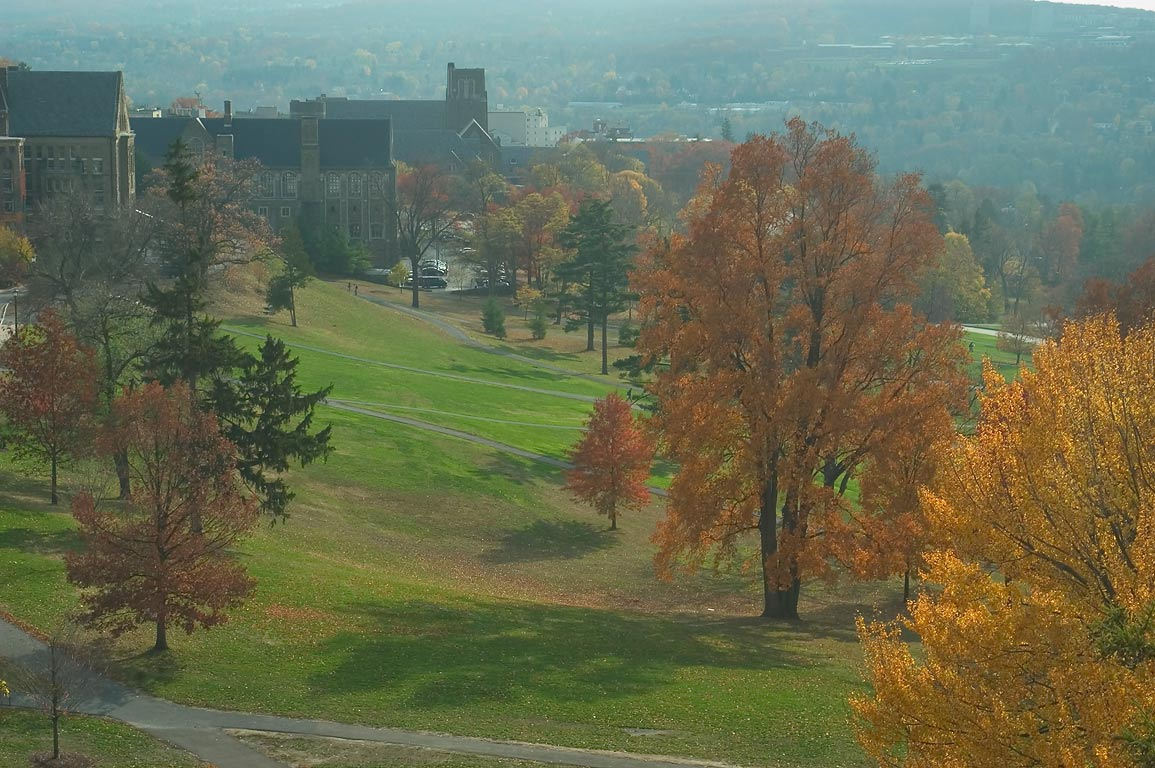
Libe Slope on the Cornell University campus in May 2006

Slope Day's origins can be traced to 1890, when the annual Navy Ball began on the Cornell University campus. The Navy Ball, held in October on the day before a major regatta on Cayuga Lake, was an evening dance with a band for the purpose of raising funds to support the Cornell crew and other athletic programs. Students traditionally skipped classes on the day of the regatta following the ball.

=== 20th century ===
In 1901, the Navy Ball was moved from October to May for the first time, and a committee including John L. Senior, Willard Dickerman Straight, and Henry Schoellkopf arranged the event and entertainment. Attendance in classes on the following day was dismal, and in 1902, the university declared the following day a holiday called Spring Day.

The annual Spring Day festivities involved a wide range of activities, from mock bullfights to circuses, typically on the Arts Quad. Spring Day remained a Cornell tradition for over 50 years. However, during the 1960s and 1970s, official Spring Day celebrations were considered an anachronism, as Cornell was in the midst of Vietnam-era protests and civil unrest.

A brief revival occurred in the spring of 1971. The Sunshine Memorial Festival was organized by a Cornell student group, Ithaca Rapid Transit. It was sponsored by Maxwell's Coffee House, a student-run coffee house, founded by Daniel Vlock ’74 in 1971 in Mary Donlon Hall, a freshman dormitory, and Noyes Center. Maxwell’s was the first coffee house in North Campus and was named after a dog housed in the dormitory and not the Beatles song.

For the concert a plywood stage was constructed at the base of Libe Slope. The speaker system was provided by Cornell Engineering School students and was powered by extension cords plugged into outlets in student dormitory rooms. Several local bands played for free. The best known was Boffalongo, who subsequently became King Harvest and were known for their hit song "Dancing in the Moonlight". An estimated 5,000 people attended. Music and dancing took place until midnight when the Cornell Safety Patrol turned off the electricity. Two additional Sunshine Memorial Festival events were planned for the Spring and Fall of 1972. However, as is typical for Ithaca weather, they were rained out.

In 1979, an event then called "Springfest" was held on the last day of classes. Cornell Dining sponsored a chicken barbecue on Libe Slope and served beer to the students. At the time, New York State's drinking age was 18, making it easy for the university to sponsor both food and alcohol service for the event. For the next six years, Springfest involved live bands playing at the base of Libe Slope, with students dancing and drinking on the Slope itself.

In December 1985, New York state raised the drinking age to 21, so Cornell officials announced that the 1986 Springfest would be held in a fenced-in area on North Campus instead of the Slope. The student body responded with a massive "Take Back the Slope" campaign. All across campus, T-shirts, signs and chalk on sidewalks beckoned students to boycott the official Springfest and "Take Back the Slope." They did by the thousands, and the name "Slope Day" replaced "Springfest." In 1987, the university caved to pressure and had Robert Cray play on the Slope, but by 1988 the bands were gone once again and Slope Day became an unofficial event. For the next decade or so, the university tolerated Slope Day, and took little action to control it except for the banning of beer kegs in 1991. For many students the focus of Slope Day became the consumption of excessive amounts of alcohol.

Starting in the mid-1990s, the university began a more gradual reining in of Slope Day, instead of repeating the failed strategy of regaining control all at once. SlopeFest, an alcohol-free event featuring carnival-style entertainment started to take place on West Campus in 1999. In 2001, the amount and type of alcohol students could bring onto the slope was limited.

=== 21st century ===
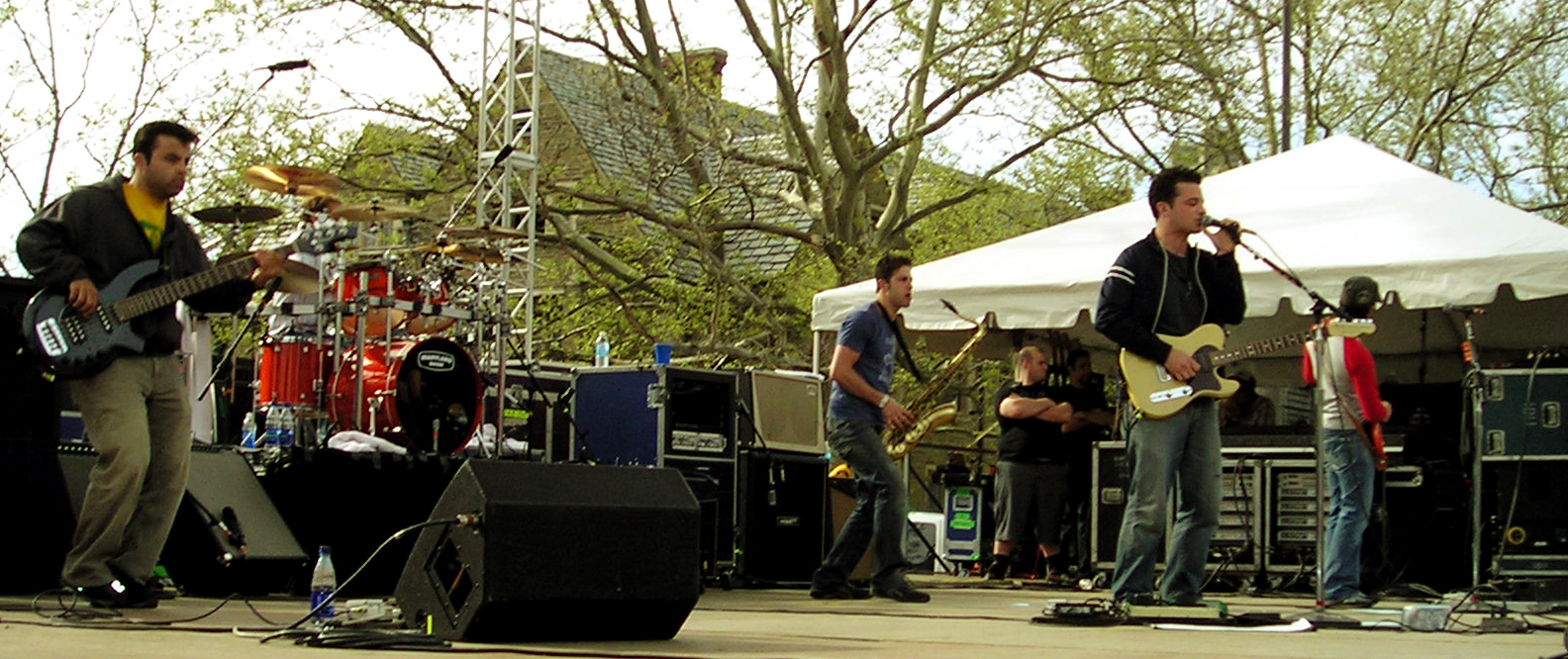
O.A.R. performing at Slope Day 2004

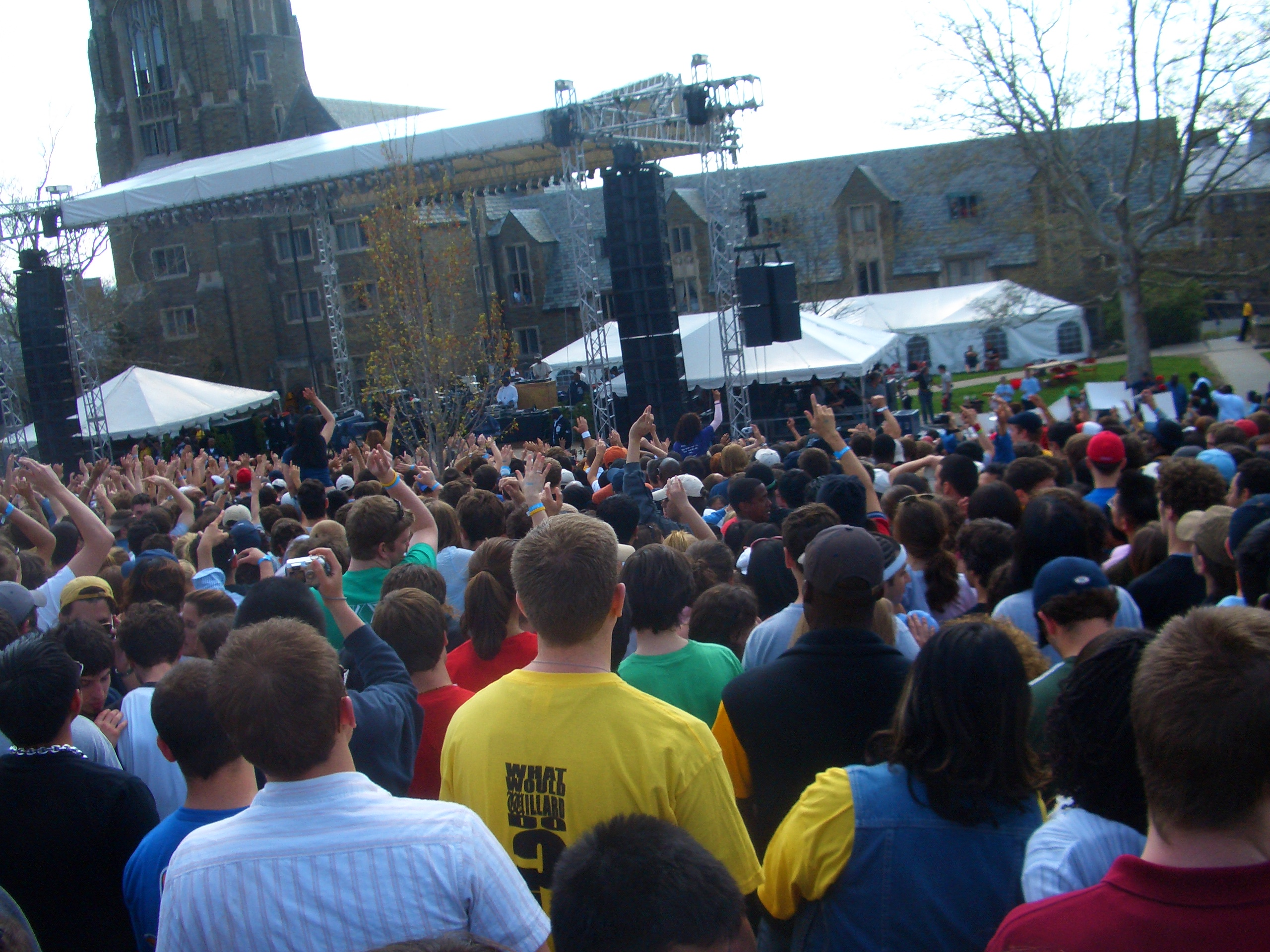
Snoop Dogg performing at Slope Day 2005

Starting in 2003, the Slope Day Steering Committee, initially organized as the President's Council on Alcohol and Other Drugs by president-emeritus Hunter S. Rawlings III, took charge of Slope Day, restricted access to Libe Slope, brought live entertainment, and provided catered food and drink service. This time, the university's assertion of control succeeded.

The students did not revolt as their predecessors had done in the late 1980s, leading to increased University prohibitions against drinking at the event.

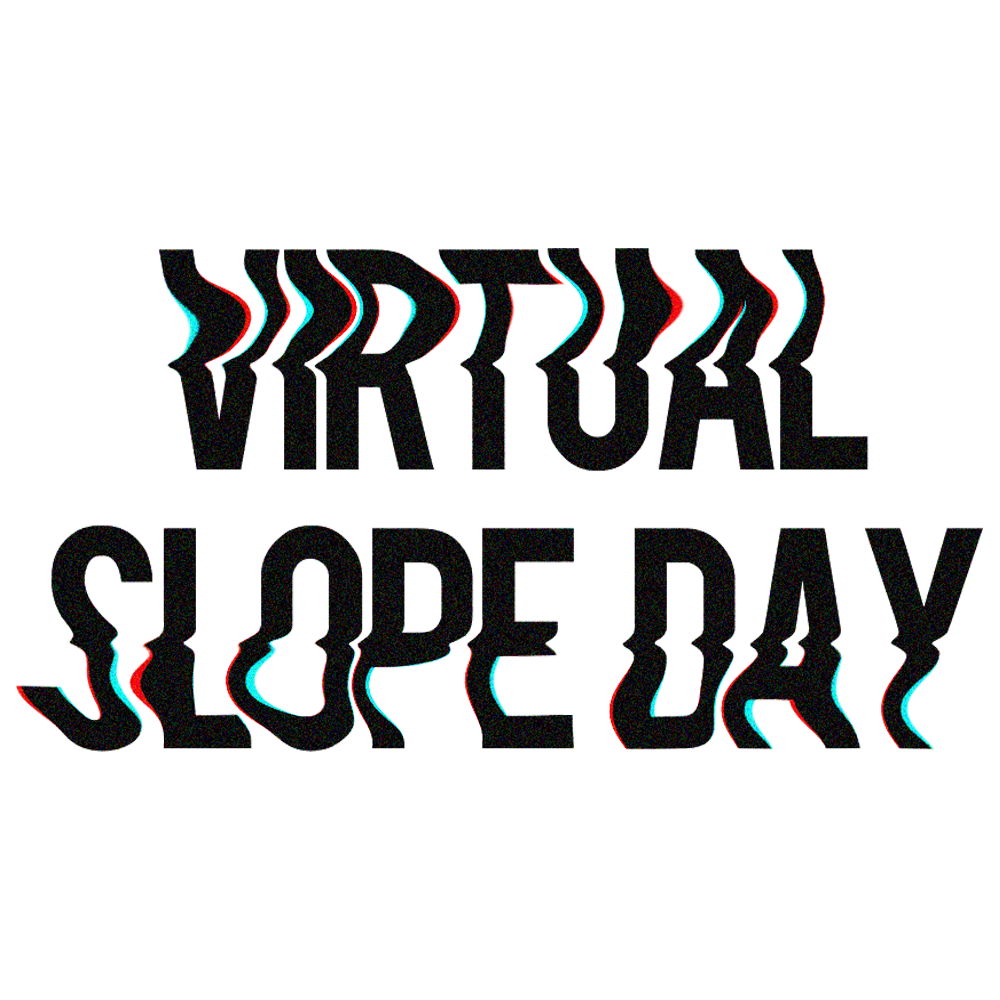
2021 Virtual Slope Day logo

In the 21st century, Slope Day measures have tried to limit excess underage drinking. Bracelets with tabs that are used as tickets to purchase alcohol are only offered to those who are of age, and only one drink is sold per purchase. Free water has been handed out to all attendees since 2006, and several volunteers on the slope have supervised students.

Due to the COVID-19 pandemic, for the first time ever, Slope Day became a 2-day event held fully online in 2020 and 2021. It returned as a one-day, in-person event in 2022.

=== Music ===
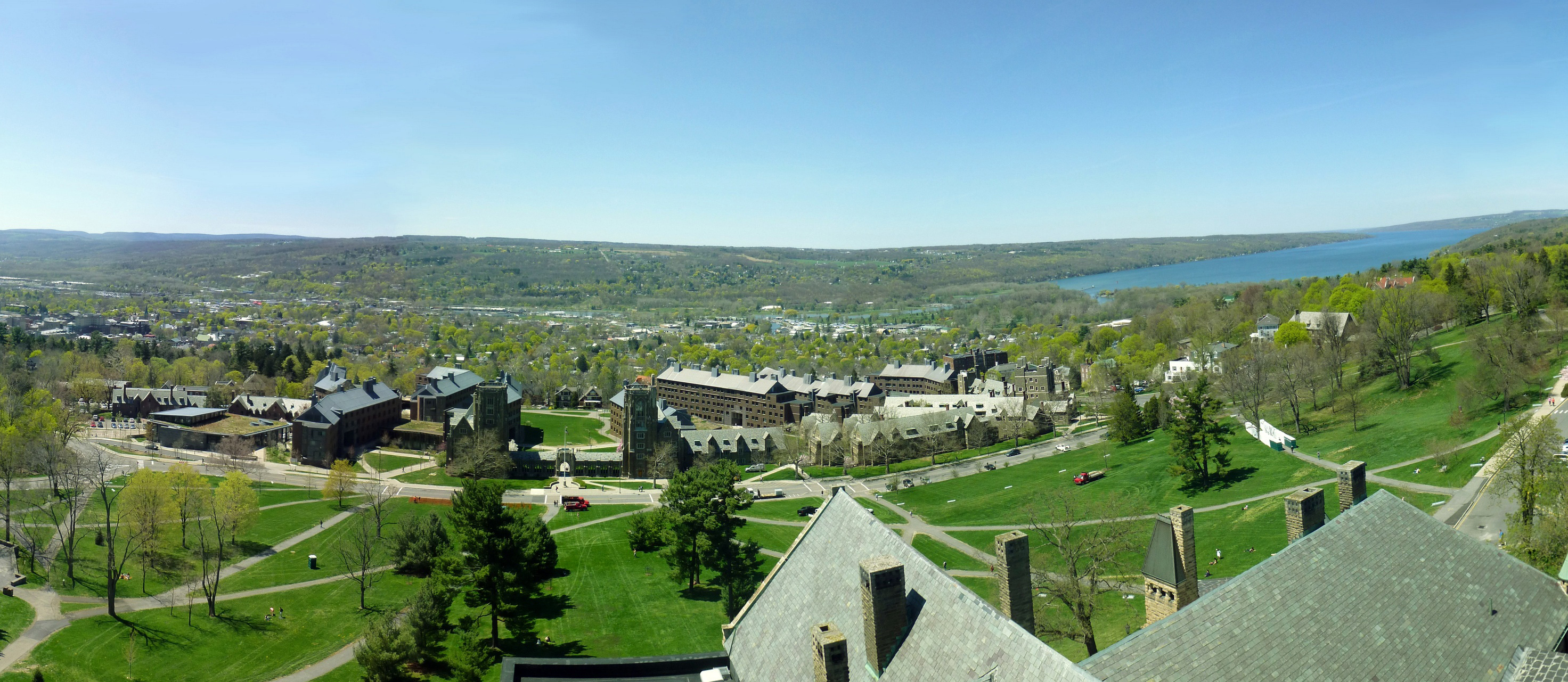
Libe Slope on the lower portion of this photograph, taken from McGraw Tower in May 2013

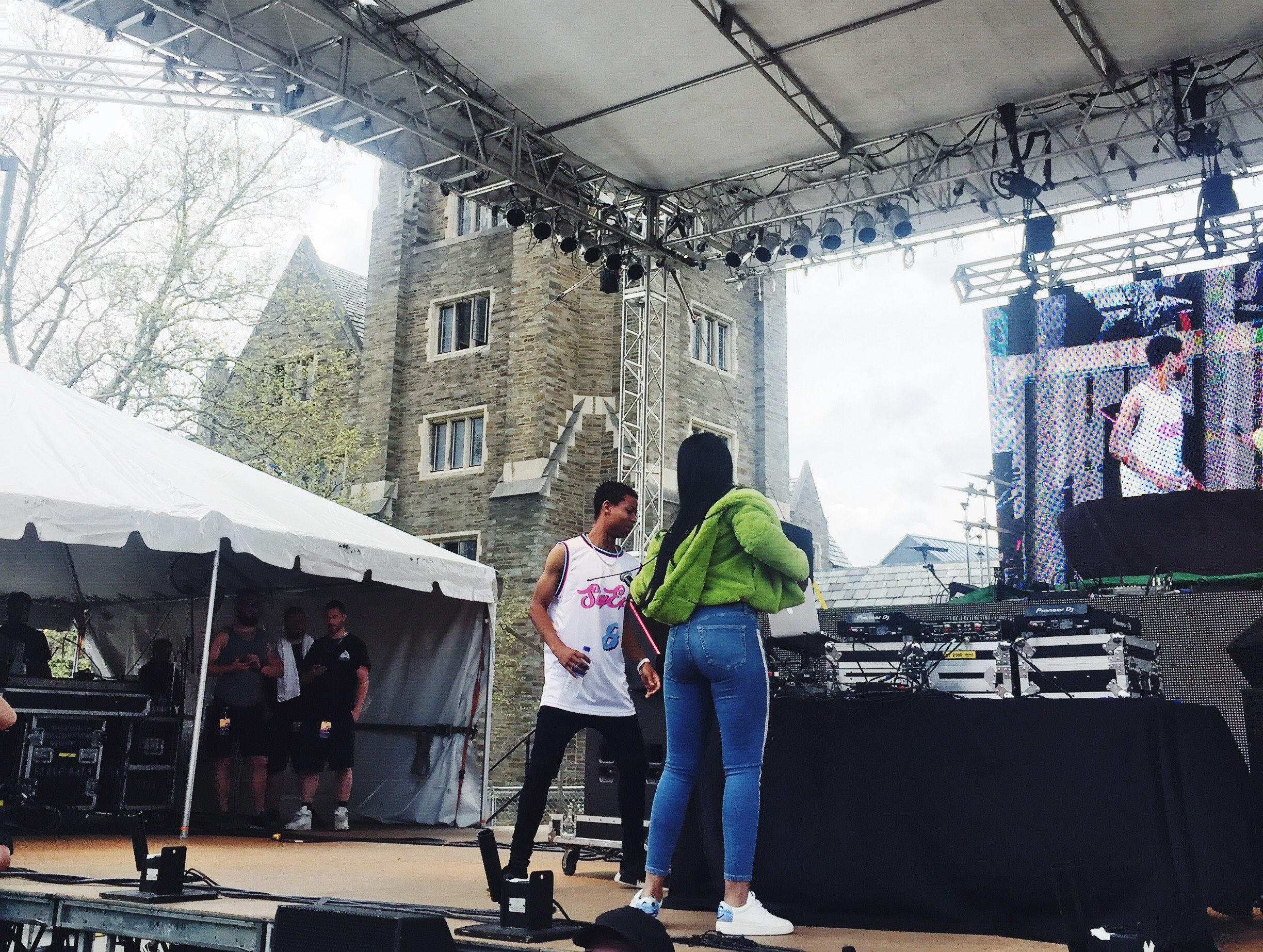
Rapper Dreezy after her Slope Day 2018 performance

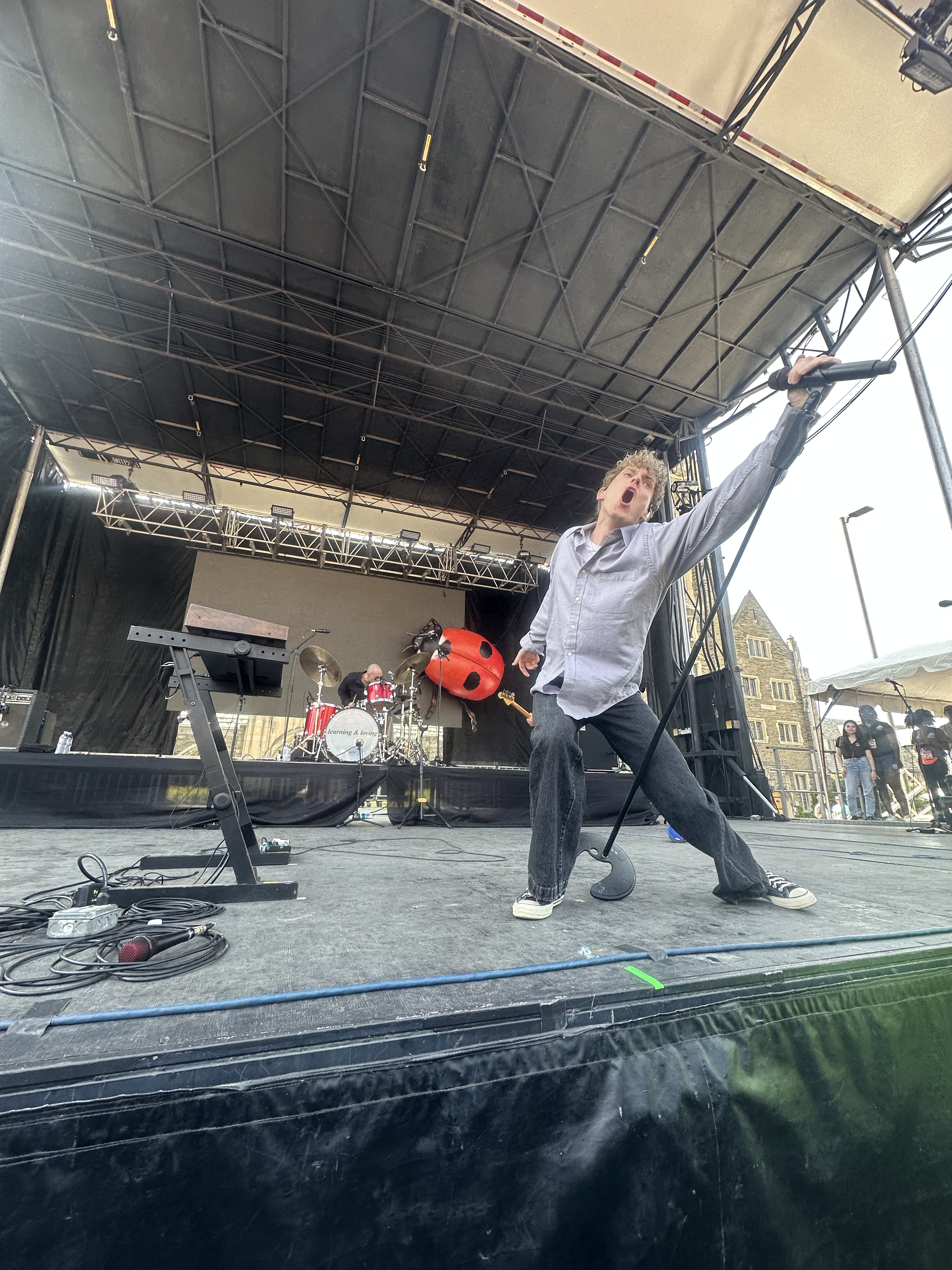
COIN performing at Slope Day 2023

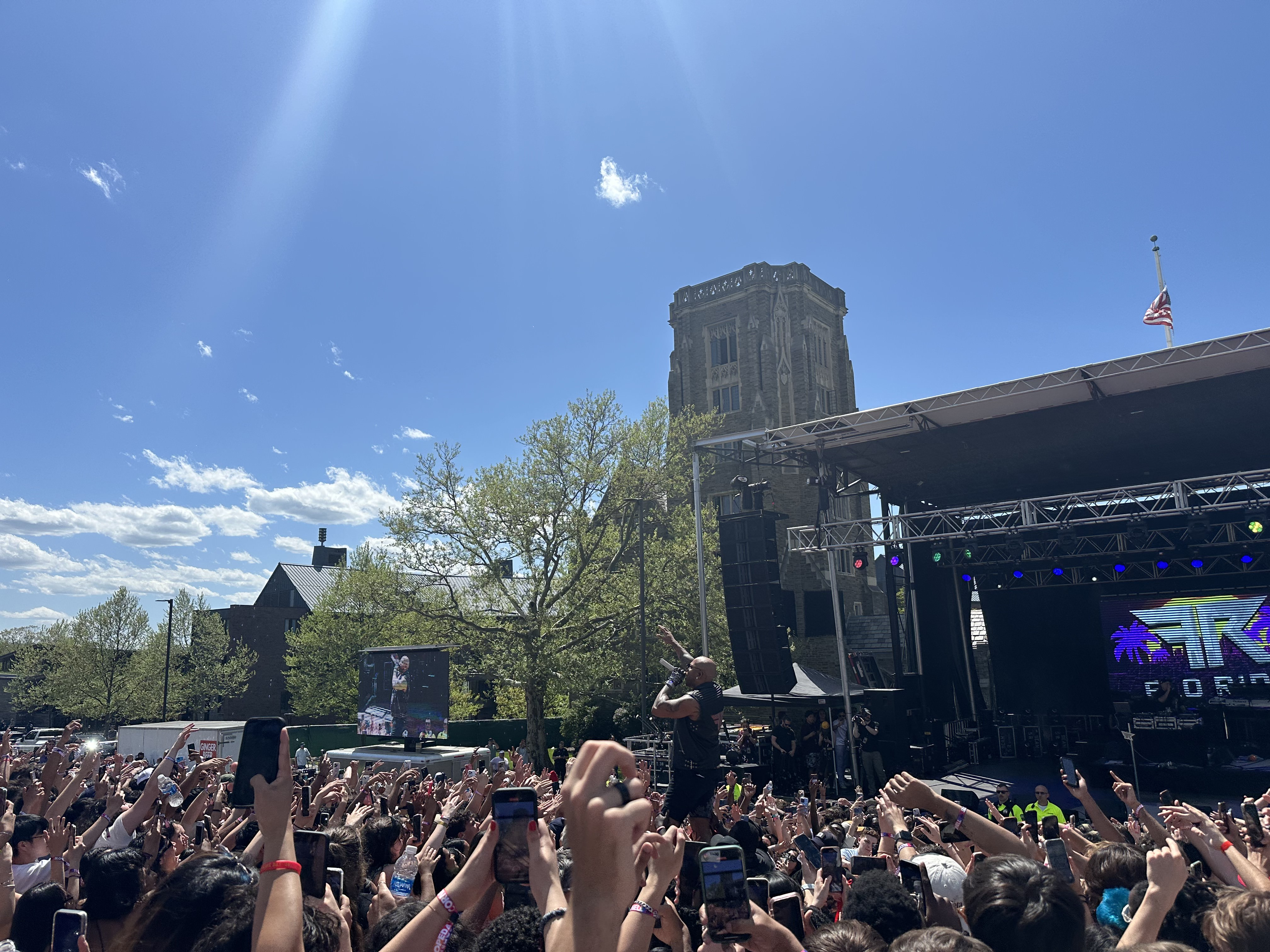
Flo Rida performing at Slope Day 2024

Live musical performances are typically held during Slope Day. Past live performances have included:

- May 1920: Sherbo's Orchestra
- May 2, 1924: Dave Harman and his Orchestra
- May 1928: R. Matthew Freeman and The Oarsmen
- 1934: Kevin McHale's Shrimpers
- May 1940: Glenn Miller
- 1947: Duke Ellington
- May 16, 1953: Charlie Spivak and Skitch Henderson
- May 15, 1954: Johnny Long and Jerry Gray
- Friday, May 6, 1977: Commander Cody and His Lost Planet Airmen, held on Libe Slope, the first new Slope Day or Springfest
- Sunday, May 8, 1977: Grateful Dead, held in Barton Hall, separate from the Slope Day It is notable for being one of the most famous and enduring recorded Grateful Dead concerts. Like all recorded performances of the Grateful Dead, it is free to download and distribute, and it is the second-most-downloaded Grateful Dead concert on the Internet Archive.
- May 1981: The B Willie Smith Band
- May 1984: Ramones, Harold Melvin & the Blue Notes, held in Barton Hall due to inclement weather
- May 1985: Southside Johnny and the Asbury Jukes
- May 9, 1986: The Del Fuegos Because New York had raised the drinking age from 18 to 21 in December 1985, the event was moved to a fenced-off area on Helen Newman / Mary Donlon fields to try to control underage alcohol consumption.
- May 1987: Robert Cray, held on Libe Slope
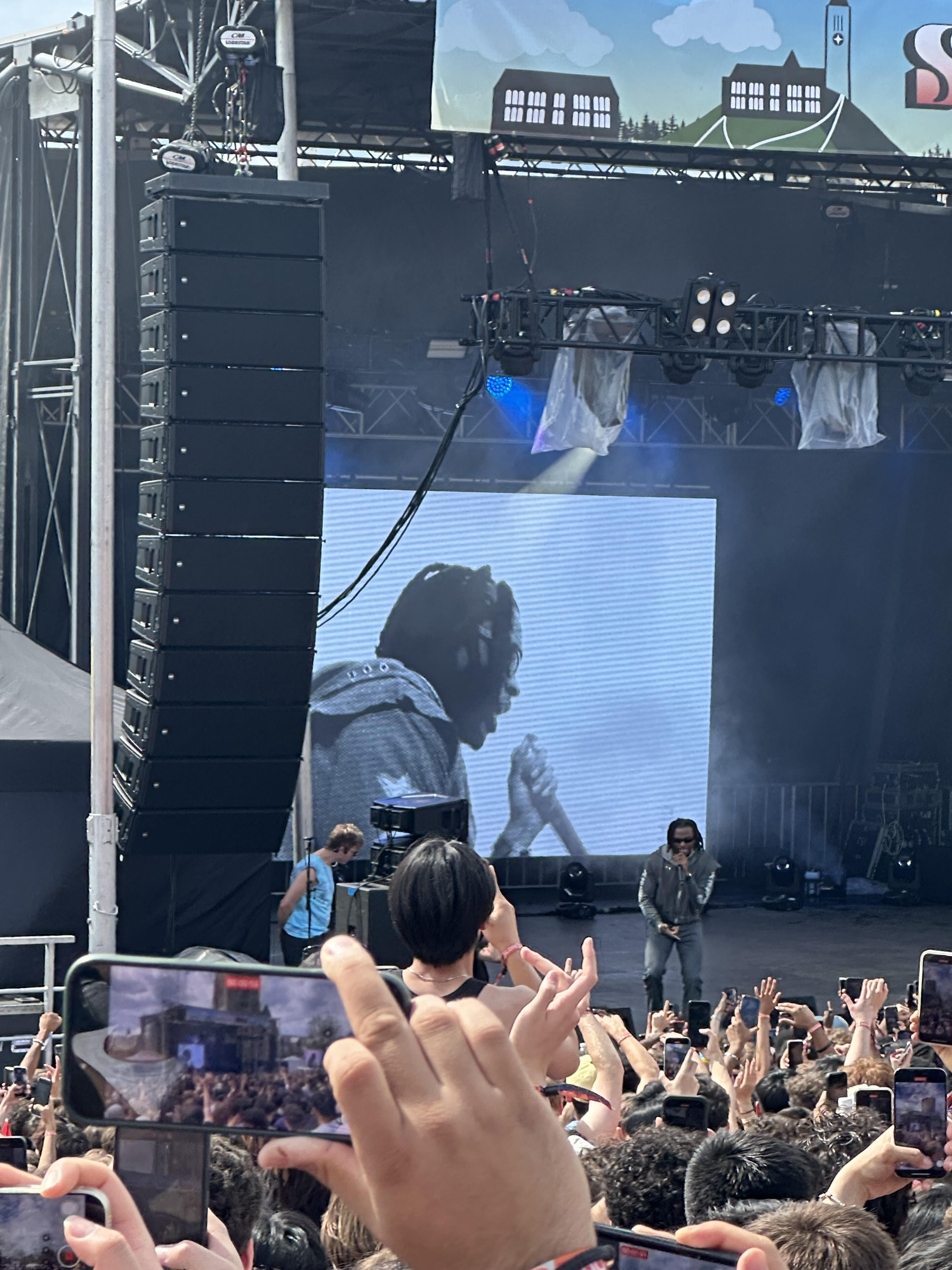
- Gunna performing at Slope Day 2025
  May 5, 2000: Pilfers
- May 4, 2001: Stroke 9
- May 3, 2002: Nada Surf
- May 2, 2003: Rusted Root, and Fat Joe
- May 7, 2004: Kanye West, O.A.R., Dilated Peoples, Matt Nathanson (did not play)
- May 6, 2005: Snoop Dogg, The Game, and The Starting Line
- May 5, 2006: Ben Folds, Talib Kweli, and Acceptance
- May 4, 2007: T.I., TV on the Radio, and Catch 22
- May 2, 2008: Ted Leo and the Pharmacists, Gym Class Heroes, and Hot Hot Heat
- May 1, 2009: Pussycat Dolls, Asher Roth, and The Apples in Stereo
- May 7, 2010: Drake, Francis and The Lights, and k-os
- May 6, 2011: Nelly, Ra Ra Riot, and The Cool Kids
- May 4, 2012: Taio Cruz, Neon Trees, and The Wailers
- May 3, 2013: Kendrick Lamar, Hoodie Allen, and 5 & A Dime
- May 8, 2014: Ludacris, Matt and Kim, and 3lau
- May 7, 2015: Chance the Rapper, and Magic!
- May 12, 2016: Walk the Moon, Cash Cash, and R. City
- May 11, 2017: Big Gigantic, MisterWives, Brasstracks, and S'natra
- May 10, 2018: Galantis, Young Bombs, and Dreezy
- May 8, 2019: Steve Aoki, Cousin Stizz, and EZI
- May 14 and 15, 2021 (held virtually due to the COVID-19 pandemic): Kyle, A Boogie wit da Hoodie, Swae Lee, Rico Nasty, and Matoma
- May 11, 2022: Aminé, Loud Luxury, and Luna Li
- May 10, 2023: COIN, Snakehips, DDG, Dok2, and Coco & Clair Clair
- May 8, 2024: A Boogie Wit da Hoodie, and Flo Rida
- May 7, 2025: Gunna, and Louis the Child
- May 6, 2026: The Chainsmokers, and Daya

=== SlopeFest ===
SlopeFest is a carnival type event accompanying Slope Day. In the past, this event has included various raffles, an airbrush tattoo artist and inflatable games. Started in 1999 by concerned students of the Slope Day Programming Board, SlopeFest was held on West Campus and hosted carnival-style games, food, and live musical performances. Starting in 2004, SlopeFest was incorporated into the main events of Slope Day and held inside the event perimeter. SlopeFest is now held on Ho Plaza. The Slope Day Programming Board, composed of students, plans all aspects of SlopeFest.

== Controversies ==
R&B singer Kehlani, the scheduled front-runner for the 2025 Slope Day, was dropped by 15th president of Cornell University Michael Kotlikoff. The decision was announced in a university-wide email on April 23, citing Kehlani's alleged "anti-semitic" and "anti-Israel sentiments." On May 2, the Slope Day Programming Board announced Gunna as the replacement headliner in a University-wide email.
