= Jake Runestad =

American classical composer

- Born: May 20, 1986 (age 40); Rockford, Illinois, United States
- Genre: Classical
- Occupations: Composer and Conductor
- Years active: 2004–present
- Website: jakerunestad.com

Jake Runestad (born May 20, 1986) is an American composer and conductor of classical music based in Minneapolis, Minnesota. He has composed music for a wide variety of musical genres and ensembles, but has achieved greatest acclaim for his work in the genres of opera, orchestral music, choral music, and wind ensemble. One of his principal collaborators for musical texts has been Todd Boss.

== Biography ==
Runestad was born in Rockford, Illinois. His post-secondary education in music began at Eastern Illinois University, which he attended in the years 2004 and 2005.

He received his first degree in music (a B.S. in Music Education) from Winona State University, which he attended from 2005 until 2009, then pursued graduate studies at the Peabody Conservatory of the Johns Hopkins University between 2009 and 2011 to earn a M.Mus. degree in music composition.

In 2020, he was a recipient of an Outstanding Recent Graduate Award from these institutions.

His teachers at the Peabody Conservatory included Kevin Puts. He studied with the composer Libby Larsen and worked with Bernard Rands, David Lang, Tania León, John Musto, Christopher Rouse, Jake Heggie, and John Duffy. He received a Distinguished Young Alumni Award from Winona State University in 2016.

== Awards and activities ==
Runestad has received awards for his compositions from the American Society of Composers, Authors, and Publishers (ASCAP), the American Composers Forum, the Peabody Conservatory, New Music USA, the Otto Bremmer Foundation, VocalEssence, the Virginia Arts Festival, the National Association for Music Education, the Association for Lutheran Church Musicians, and the American Choral Directors Association of Minnesota.

He has received commissions for his musical works from the Washington National Opera, the Louisiana Philharmonic Orchestra, Seraphic Fire, the Dayton Philharmonic Orchestra, the Virginia Arts Festival, the Rockford Symphony Orchestra, the Cincinnati Vocal Arts Ensemble, the Spire Chamber Ensemble, the Master Chorale of Tampa Bay, and Craig Hella Johnson and Conspirare. He was also selected as a Composer in residence for the 2015–16 season of Choral Arts. In 2016, he was a recipient of the Morton Gould Young Composer Award from the ASCAP Foundation in recognition of his composition Dreams of the Fallen.

In May 2017, he was awarded a McKnight Fellowship for Composers (funded by the McKnight Foundation). and was awarded the 2019 Raymond W. Brock Commission of the American Choral Directors Association, in this case for the composition "A Silence Haunts Me."

Runestad's compositions have received notices in the New York Times, a contribution to the Huffington Post blog, and other newspapers.

Runestad is a member of the Program Council for New Music USA. His music has been published by Boosey & Hawkes and JR Music.

The first recording devoted solely to the music of Jake Runestad, The Hope of Loving: Choral Music of Jake Runestad, was released by Delos Productions in 2019. The recording features fourteen compositions performed by the choral ensemble Conspirare of Austin, Texas, conducted by Craig Hella Johnson.

Later that year, the recording was nominated for a Grammy Award for Best Choral Performance. In 2020, Naxos Records released the album Sing, Wearing the Sky, a collection of 10 choral compositions by Runestad performed by the Kantorei choir of Denver conducted by Joel Rinsema.

Runestad's Earth Symphony (2022) has been awarded an Emmy in the category musical composition.

== Dreams of the Fallen ==
On Veterans Day, 11 November 2013, the Louisiana Philharmonic Orchestra, the Symphony Chorus of New Orleans, and pianist Jeffrey Biegel, under the direction of James Paul, presented Runestad's Dreams of the Fallen, a work for piano, orchestra, and chorus at the National World War II Museum. The work features the poetry of Iraq War veteran Brian Turner and explores a soldier's emotional response to the experience of war.

Dreams of the Fallen was commissioned by a consortium including the Louisiana Philharmonic Orchestra and the Symphony Chorus of New Orleans, the Dayton Philharmonic Orchestra and Chorus, the Rockford Symphony Orchestra and Chorus, the Philharmonic of Southern New Jersey, and the Virginia Arts Festival. It received its New York City premiere with the West Point Glee Club and the Park Avenue Chamber Symphony at Carnegie Hall on 19 November 2016, conducted by David Bernard. His "Dreams of the Fallen" for chorus, orchestra and solo piano was premiered by the Chicago Composers Orchestra in 2018 on the 100th anniversary of the armistice of World War I.

An audio recording of a 2015 performance of Dreams of the Fallen in St. Paul, Minnesota, was broadcast nationwide on 29 May 2017 (Memorial Day) through the National Public Radio network.

== Discography ==
- "I Will Lift Mine Eyes" on Seraphic Fire. Seraphic Fire. Patrick Dupré Quigley, conductor. ℗ 2013 Seraphic Fire Media.
- "Nada Te Turbe" on Sheer Grace, National Lutheran Choir. David Cherwien, conductor. ℗ 2013 The National Lutheran Choir.
- "Fear Not, Dear Friend" on Reincarnations. Seraphic Fire. Patrick Dupré Quigley, conductor. ℗ 2014 Seraphic Fire Media.
- "I Will Lift Mine Eyes" on Look Up and See. Sounding Light. Tom Trenney, conductor. ℗ 2014.
- "Sleep, Little Baby, Sleep" on Candlelight Carols. Seraphic Fire. Patrick Dupré Quigley, conductor. ℗ 2014 Seraphic Fire Media.
- "Let My Love Be Heard" on Carol of the Angels, Choral Arts Northwest. Robert Bode, conductor. ℗ 2016 Choral Arts Northwest.
- "Reflections" on The Road Home, Santa Fe Desert Chorale. Joshua Habermann, conductor. ℗ 2016 Chandos Records.
- "The Hope of Loving" on Light of the Midnight Sun, Master Chorale of Tampa Bay. James Bass, conductor. ℗ 2018 The Master Chorale of Tampa Bay.
- "Let My Love Be Heard" on Enchanted Isle, VOCES8. ℗ 2019 Decca Records.
- The Hope of Loving: Choral Works of Jake Runestad, ℗ 2019 Delos Productions.
- Sing, Wearing the Sky, ℗ 2020 Naxos Records

== Principal Compositions ==
Listings and information about Jake Runestad's compositions are found on the composer's website.

Operas

- The Toll (2010), premiered at the Peabody Conservatory, Friedberg Hall, 4 May 2010
- The Abbess and the Acolyte (2011), premiered at the Virginia Arts Festival, 12 June 2011
- Daughters of the Bloody Duke (2014), premiered at the Washington National Opera on 21 November 2014

Orchestral Works

- "As Rain to the Sea" (2010, soprano soloist with orchestra)
- "Mechanical Minds" (2011)
- "World on Fire" (2019), commissioned by the Oregon Coast Music Festival, James Paul, conductor

Choir and Orchestra

- "Dreams of the Fallen" (2013, solo piano, chorus, and orchestra)
- "Climb" (2017, chorus and orchestra), text by Todd Boss
- "Ave Verum" (2017, SATB and string orchestra), first performed 23 April 2017 at the John F. Kennedy Center for the Performing Arts, Washington, DC, with the Choral Arts Society of Washington, Scott Tucker, conductor, text by Todd Boss
- "Into the Light" (2017, SATB chorus and orchestra), commissioned by Valparaiso University to commemorate the 500th anniversary of the Reformation, first performed at the Thomaskirche in Leipzig and the Castle Church in Wittenberg with the Leipzig Baroque Orchestra and Valparaiso University Chorale, Christopher Cock, conductor
- "Proud Music of the Storm" (2017, SATB chorus and orchestra), commissioned by the Dallas Symphony Chorus, Joshua Habermann, conductor
- Earth Symphony (2022, SATB chorus and orchestra), commissioned by True Concord Voices & Orchestra, Eric Holtan, conductor, text by Todd Boss

Choir and Instrumental Ensemble

- "We Can Mend the Sky" (2014, SATB and percussion)
- "The Hope of Loving" (2015, SATB, soprano, tenor, baritone, and string quartet), commissioned by Seraphic Fire
- "One Flock" (2016, SATB, soloists, piano, and percussion), commissioned by Schola Cantorum on Hudson, Deborah Simpkin King, conductor, text by Todd Boss
- "The Secret of the Sea" (2018, SATB divisi, piano, percussion, & string quintet), commissioned by Craig Hella Johnson and KI Concerts
- “As Long As We Are Here” (2020, SATB choir, string orchestra, and piano), commissioned by Brett Karlin and the Master Chorale of South Florida, text by Todd Boss
- "Cello Songs" (2020, SATB choir, cello, and piano), commissioned by the St. Charles Singers, texts by Todd Boss
- "The Way of the Stars" (2020, SATB choir, percussion, piano), commissioned by the Atlanta Master Chorale, Eric Nelson, conductor, texts by Maria Mitchell
- "El último hilo" (2021, SATB choir, marimba, and string quartet), commissioned by the Kantorei (Denver) and Vocalis (Guatemala), texts by Humberto Ak'abal
- "The Lighthouse Keeper" (2024 SATB choir, piano, strings), commissioned by Izumi Hara and David Koshik for California State University, Long Beach's Bob Cole Chamber Choir; texts by Witter Bynner, Henry Wadsworth Longfellow, Kahlil Gibran, Runestad, Edna St. Vincent Millay

Choir and Piano

- "The King of Love" (2013, SATB and piano)
- "None Other Lamb" (2013, SATB and piano)
- "Peace Flows Into Me" (2013, SATB and piano)
- "The Peace of Wild Things" (2014, SATB and piano)
- "Good Night, My Love" (2015, SATB and piano), commissioned by Marietta College, text by Paul Lawrence Dunbar
- "Come to the Woods" (2015, SATB and piano), commissioned by Craig Hella Johnson and Conspirare
- "Waves" (2015, SSAATTBB and piano), commissioned by Robert Istad and California State University, Fullerton, text by Todd Boss
- "Reflections" (2016, SATB and piano), commissioned by the Santa Fe Desert Chorale
- "Please Stay" (2016, SATB and piano)
- "Rise Up" (2016, SSAA and piano), commissioned by the American Choral Directors Association
- "American Triptych": I. Reflections; II. The Peace of Wild Things; III. Come to the Woods (2016, SATB and piano)
- "Winter Stars" (2017), commissioned by the University of Montana, David Edmonds, conductor
- "A Silence Haunts Me" (2018, SATB and piano), commissioned by the American Choral Directors Association and the Raymond C. Brock Foundation, text by Todd Boss
- "An die Musik" (2019), commissioned by Lorelee Wederstrom and Unity Church-Unitarian, Saint Paul, Minnesota, in honor of Ruth Palmer
- "Your Soul Is Song" (2019), commissioned by Choirs of America for a premiere at Carnegie Hall

Unaccompanied Choir

- "Nyon Nyon" (2006, SATB)
- "I Will Lift Mine Eyes" (2006, SATB), performed before Pope Francis at the Sistine Chapel, Vatican City, on 20 November 2016
- "Fear Not, Dear Friend" (2012, SATB or TTBB), commissioned by Seraphic Fire
- "Sleep, Little Baby, Sleep" (2012, SATB), commissioned by Seraphic Fire
- "Nada Te Turbe" (2012, SATB), commissioned by Seraphic Fire
- "Alleluia" (2013, SATB)
- "Spirited Light" (2014, SATB)
- "Why the Caged Bird Sings" (2014, SATB), commissioned by Craig Hella Johnson and the Cincinnati Vocal Arts Ensemble
- "Let My Love Be Heard" (2014, SATB), commissioned by Choral Arts, text by Alfred Noyes
- "Ner Ner" (2014, SATB), commissioned by the College of Wooster’s Wooster Chorus
- "Gaelic Prayer" (2015, SATB)
- "And So I Go On" (2015, SSAATTBB), commissioned by Jonathan Talberg and Edith Copley in memory of German Aguilar, first performance by the Bob Cole Conservatory of Music Chamber Choir at California State University, Long Beach, text by Todd Boss
- "All the World’s A Stage" (2015, SATB), commissioned by the University of Cincinnati – College-Conservatory of Music, texts by William Shakespeare
- "Live the Questions" (2016, SATB), commissioned by Choral Arts Northwest
- "Give Me Hunger" (2018, SATB), commissioned by a consortium of university choirs
- "Love after Love" (2019, SATB), commissioned by Michael McGaghie for the Macalester College Concert Choir
- "Elegy" (2020, SATB with Soprano and Baritone soloists), commissioned by John Byun and the Riverside City College Chamber Singers for a performance at the 2020 American Choral Directors Association Western Region Conference
- "Fireflies" (2020, SATB choir), commissioned by the Iowa Choral Directors Association
- "How'll You Know" (2023, SATB choir), commissioned by the San Antonio Chamber Choir, text by Todd Boss

Jazz Ensemble

- "Home" (2008)

Wind Ensemble

- "Catalyst" (2007)
- "Let My Love Be Heard" (2018)
- "Rivers of Air" (2018), commissioned by a consortium of seventeen North American university wind ensembles
- "Ascent" (2019), commissioned by Scott Stewart and the Atlanta Youth Wind Symphony

Voice and Chamber Ensemble

- "Under the Harvest Moon" (2009, soprano, cello, and piano)
- "The Soul, Like the Moon" (2011, soprano and Pierrot ensemble)
