= Dreams of the Fallen =

Choral symphony-concerto by Jake Runestad

Dreams of the Fallen is a choral symphony-concerto for solo piano, SATB chorus, and orchestra with music by the composer Jake Runestad set to texts of the poet Brian Turner, a veteran of the Iraq War. Dreams of the Fallen earned its composer the Morton Gould Young Composer Award from the ASCAP Foundation in 2016.

The work was first performed on Veterans Day, 11 November 2013, at The National WWII Museum in New Orleans. The participating ensembles included the Louisiana Philharmonic Orchestra, the Symphony Chorus of New Orleans, the Dayton Philharmonic Orchestra and Chorus, the Rockford Symphony Orchestra and Chorus, the Philharmonic of Southern New Jersey, and the Virginia Arts Festival.

It received its New York City premiere with the West Point Glee Club, the New Amsterdam Singers, the Young New Yorkers' Chorus, and the Park Avenue Chamber Symphony at Carnegie Hall on 19 November 2016, conducted by David Bernard.

== Composition ==
The collaboration among the original artists who created Dreams of the Fallen was led by the pianist Jeffrey Biegel. Jake Runestad was approached by Biegel for the musical score, which is a setting of selected the texts by Brian Turner. Dreams of the Fallen is a compilation of poetry from Turner’s books Here, Bullet and Phantom Noise, which address a soldier’s emotional response to the experience of war. Much of the poetry relates to Turner’s own experiences during his period of service in the Iraq War. The goal of the work is to convey the sensation of war from the bottom up by exploring its impact on individual soldiers.

== Music ==
The work is composed for SATB chorus, orchestra, and solo piano. Due to its monumental conception, a very specific instrumental disposition is called for, with the following: 2.2.2.2, 4.2.3.1, timpani +2, piano, harp, and strings. The unique inclusion of a prominent solo piano part was prepared in deference to the contributions of Jeffrey Biegel in commissioning the work and bringing the original performers together.

The work consists of five movements:

1. Wading Out
2. Here, Bullet
3. Phantom Noise
4. Sadiq
5. Wading Out

== Additional performances ==
Besides the world première in New Orleans and the 2016 performance at Carnegie Hall in New York City, performances of Dreams of the Fallen have also been organized at the following venues:

- 2 November 2014, Eastern Center for the Performing Arts, Voorhees, New Jersey: Philharmonic of Southern New Jersey, Temple University Concert Choir, Rutgers University-Camden Choir, Matthew Oberstein, conductor
- 18 November 2014, Coronado Theatre, Rockford, Illinois: Rockford Symphony Orchestra
- 11 October 2015, Saint Paul, Minnesota: VocalEssence & the Metropolitan Symphony Orchestra, Philip Brunelle, conductor
- 13 and 14 November 2015, Dayton, Ohio: Dayton Philharmonic Orchestra & Chorus, Neal Gittleman, conductor.
- 8 and 9 March 2016, Lincoln, Nebraska: Lincoln Symphony Orchestra, Edward Polochick, conductor.
- 28 April 2017, Tacoma, Washington: University of Puget Sound Orchestra & Chorus, Wesley Schulz, conductor
- 5 May 2018, Chicago: Chicago Composers Orchestra and Wicker Park Choral Singers
- 3–4 November 2018, Tucson, Arizona: True Concord Voices & Orchestra, Eric Holtan, conductor

== Broadcast ==
An audio recording of the 2015 performance of Dreams of the Fallen in St. Paul, Minnesota, was broadcast nationwide on 29 May 2017 (Memorial Day) through the National Public Radio network.
