= Virginia Arts Festival =

The Virginia Arts Festival is a Norfolk-based non-profit arts presenter which serves southeastern Virginia, offering dozens of performances during the spring and throughout the year. Virginia Arts Festival performances have included international ballet companies, along with modern, contemporary, and ethnic dance companies; world-renowned soloists and ensembles in musical genres including classical, jazz, world, folk, rock, blues, bluegrass, country, and pop; opera; theater and cabaret; and collaborative productions with local arts organizations like the Virginia Symphony Orchestra.

== History ==
The City of Norfolk and a group of arts patrons, seeking to increase local tourism during the spring "shoulder season," approached Robert W. Cross in 1995 to create a performing arts festival that would serve as a cultural destination for the region. Cross produced the first Virginia International Waterside Arts Festival in 1997, presenting an 18-day festival featuring such performers as Stuttgart Chamber Orchestra, the Mark Morris Dance Group, contemporary composer/performer Steve Reich, and jazz legends Ramsey Lewis and Billy Taylor. The 1997 Festival also saw the creation of the first Virginia International Tattoo, an international display of military bands, drill teams, and pipe and drum corps.

After four successful years, in 2001 the name was officially changed to the Virginia Arts Festival.

The Washington Post has called the Virginia Arts Festival the "Tidewater Tanglewood." From a two-week festival in its first year, the festival has tripled in size and attendance. In 2016, the Virginia Arts Festival celebrated its 20th Anniversary season, presenting 72 ticketed performances throughout the region from mid-April through June, with patrons traveling from 49 states and 13 countries.

== Education ==
Reaching tens of thousands of students every year, the Virginia Arts Festival offers year-round arts education programs, presenting special student matinee performances and aligning visiting performing artists with area schools for master classes, in-school workshops, and demonstrations. According to their 2016 Annual Report, the organization's education programs reached 39,644 area school children during the 2015–16 season.

== Commissions ==
The Festival's John Duffy Institute for New Opera seeks out and supports the work of opera composer/librettist teams by providing professional mentorship and a professional process for the development of their new work, with the intent to see the works through to full productions. In May, 2016, the Festival will present the world premiere of Kept: a ghost story, a world premiere performances of the new opera Kept: a ghost story, at Norfolk's Attucks Theatre. Created by composer Kristin Kuster and librettist Megan Levad, the work was developed over a three-year process through the Duffy Institute. Additional new operas are currently in the development phase and will receive their premieres in 2018 and beyond.

In addition to its commissions through the Duffy Institute, the Virginia Arts Festival has commissioned 18 works of music, dance, and opera:

- Brahms Variations - In 2016 the Virginia Arts Festival commissioned a new work from Dance Theatre of Harlem in honor of the Festival's 20th season. Choreographed by Robert Garland and set to Johannes Brahms' Variations on a Theme by Haydn, the ballet was premiered at Chrysler Hall in Norfolk, Virginia, on May 14, 2016, with Benjamin Rous conducting the Virginia Symphony Orchestra in the pit.
- BEN-HUR, A tale of the Christ - Composer and percussionist Stewart Copeland created a new score for a 90-minute edited version of the 1925 MGM silent epic film; the work was premiered with the Virginia Arts Festival Orchestra, conducted by Richard Kaufman, in Norfolk, on April 19, 2014.
- Song of the Shulamite - Composer Donald McCullough, founder of the Virginia Symphony Chorus and Virginia Chorale, and for more than a decade the music director of the Master Chorale of Washington, premiered his new work in November 2012 at George Mason University in Fairfax, VA. The Virginia Arts Festival co-commissioned this piece, named after the beautiful young bride and heroine in "Song of Solomon" in the Bible.
- Dreams of the Fallen – Created by composer Jake Runestad, a fellow of the John Duffy Composer's Institute, this musical work combined solo piano, chorus, and orchestra with powerful texts written by Iraq War veteran and award-winning poet Brian Turner, chronicling a soldier's emotional response to the experience of war. The work was premiered in New Orleans in 2013.
- Rappahannock County - American composer Ricky Ian Gordon and librettist Mark Campbell were commissioned to write a staged song cycle in commemoration of the Sesquicentennial Anniversary of the American Civil War. Rappahannock County which had its world premiere in Norfolk, VA April 12, 2011, the same day that Confederate forces attacked Fort Sumter in 1861, with subsequent performances in Richmond, VA and Austin, TX.
- Romeo and Juliet, On Motifs of Shakespeare: Mark Morris Dance Group – This commissioning project was an extension of many years of creative collaboration between the Festival and Mark Morris Dance Group; the world premiere performance featured the Virginia Symphony Orchestra in the pit. Inspired by the recently restored manuscripts that Soviet cultural officials originally rejected and suppressed, Mark Morris set his choreography to Prokofiev's original unedited 1935 ballet score. This historic production (which was part of a 10-member international commissioning consortium project) included, for the first time, an entire fourth act that until now had never been heard (Prokofiev was forced to supplant this act with his known 'epilogue' ending). Virginia Symphony Orchestra played the score live during the 2009 Festival.
- Septet – This work was commissioned by the Festival in consortium with other national presenters from American composer Ellen Taaffe Zwilich and was performed by the Kalichstein-Laredo-Robinson Trio (KLR Trio) and Miami String Quartet during the 2009 Festival.
- Piano Trio – Renowned composer and icon of contemporary American music, Joan Tower was jointly commissioned by the Virginia Arts Festival, La Jolla Music Society and Chamber Music Society of Lincoln Center to compose a piano trio in 2008. The premiere performance piece featured chamber musicians: violinist Cho-Liang Lin, cellist Gary Hoffman, and pianist André-Michel Schub.
- Pocahontas Chamber Opera – Composed by Linda Tutas Haugen and libretto by Joan Vail Thorne, this joint commission with Virginia Opera was a world premiere production, presented in 2007 in honor of the 400th anniversary of the Jamestown, Virginia landing.
- America's 400th Anniversary Celebration – Four new musical works were commissioned this 2007 commemoration event by American composers John Corigliano, John Duffy, Adolphus Hailstork, and Jennifer Higdon.
- A Midsummer Night's Dream – This fully staged world premiere production, presented in 2005, was performed in 2005 with the orchestra on stage with the actors, with the score taken from Mendelssohn's Overture and Incidental Music.
- The Lost Treasure of Atlantis – The Imani Winds quintet created this new work for Virginia Arts Festival education programs in 2006.
- Chinese Ancient Dance Suite and Night Thoughts – Two chamber music works were commissioned from Chinese-born American composer Chen Yi in 2004.
- Gershwin's World - Jazz master Herbie Hancock created an orchestral version of his Grammy Award-winning 1998 album Gershwin's World, which received its world premiere in the 2003 Virginia Arts Festival.
- Memories of a Possible Future – Composed by Bruce Adolphe, this work for piano and string quartet was co-commissioned by the Virginia Arts Festival and the Chamber Music Society of Lincoln Center and was premiered in 2002.

== Recordings ==
Virginia Arts Festival performances have been recorded for the Naxos label, including the Festival-commissioned song cycle by Rappahannock County, Stravinsky's Les Noces and The Soldier's Tale, and the Schoenberg transcriptions of Mahler's Das Lied von der Erde and Songs of a Wayfarer. Additionally, the Festival's presentation of Peter and the Wolf: A Special Report was recorded for NPR Classics.
