= Runestad =

Runestad is a surname. Notable people with the surname include:

- Jake Runestad (born 1986), American composer and conductor
- Jim Runestad (born 1959), American politician
