= 54th Annual Grammy Awards =

2012 US music awards ceremony

- Date: February 12, 2012; 1:00–3:30 p.m. PST (Pre-Telecast Ceremony); 5:00–8:30 p.m. PST (54th Grammy Awards)
- Location: Staples Center, Los Angeles, California
- Hosted by: LL Cool J

Highlights
- Most awards: Adele (6)
- Most nominations: Kanye West (7)

Television/radio coverage
- Network: CBS
- Viewership: 40 million viewers

The 54th Annual Grammy Awards were held on February 12, 2012, at the Staples Center in Los Angeles being broadcast on CBS honoring the best in music for the recording year beginning October 1, 2010 through September 30, 2011. LL Cool J hosted the show. It was the first time in seven years that the event had an official host. Nominations were announced on November 30, 2011, on prime-time television as part of "The GRAMMY Nominations Concert Live! – Countdown to Music's Biggest Night", a one-hour special broadcast live on CBS from Nokia Theatre at L.A. Live. Kanye West received the most nominations with seven. Adele, Foo Fighters, and Bruno Mars each received six nominations. Lil Wayne, Skrillex, and Radiohead all earned five nominations. The nominations were criticised by many music journalists as Kanye West's My Beautiful Dark Twisted Fantasy missed out on a nomination for Album of the Year despite being highly critically acclaimed and topping many end of year charts. West's album went on to win Best Rap Album.

A total of 78 awards were presented following the academy's decision to restructure the Grammy Award categories. Paul McCartney received the MusiCares Person of the Year award on February 10, 2012, at the Los Angeles Convention Center, two nights prior to the Grammy telecast.

On February 8, 2012, the academy announced that the 54th Grammy Pre-Telecast Ceremony would stream live internationally. The ceremony took place at the Los Angeles Convention Center and was streamed live in its entirety internationally at Grammy's official website and CBS Television Network. The ceremony was co-hosted by Dave Koz and MC Lyte. A total of 68 awards were presented in the Pre-Telecast ceremony. The official poster was designed by architect Frank Gehry.

On February 7, 2012, following Etta James' death on January 20, 2012, The Recording Academy announced a tribute performance Alicia Keys and Bonnie Raitt. The day before the ceremony, Whitney Houston died in Los Angeles, and the show's producers quickly planned a tribute in the form of Jennifer Hudson singing Houston's "I Will Always Love You". The awards show began with a Bruce Springsteen performance followed by an LL Cool J prayer for Whitney Houston.

Adele won all of her six nominations, equalling the record for most wins by a female artist in one night, first held by Beyoncé. Adele became only the second artist in history, following Christopher Cross in 1981, to have won all four of the general field (Album of the Year, Best New Artist, Record of the Year and Song of the Year) awards throughout her career. Foo Fighters and Kanye West followed with five and four awards, respectively. With his win for Best Musical Theater Album (for The Book of Mormon: Original Broadway Cast Recording), producer Scott Rudin became the 11th person to become an EGOT winner.

== Ratings ==
The anticipation for the show's tributes to Whitney Houston greatly helped increase the ratings for the 54th Grammy Awards, which became the second highest in its history with 39.9 million viewers (trailing only behind the 1984 Grammys with 51.67 million viewers). The rating was 50% higher than in 2011. This remains the highest-rated Grammy telecast on 21st-century U.S. television.

== Pre-telecast ==
=== Performers ===
- Kim Burrell, Le'Andria Johnson, Kelly Price and Trin-I-Tee 5:7
- Joyce DiDonato
- Steve Earle
- Rebirth Brass Band
- The Civil Wars

=== Presenters ===
- Gerald Clayton
- Chick Corea
- Brandon Heath
- Arturo O'Farrill
- OK Go
- Corinne Bailey Rae
- Esperanza Spalding
- Jimmy Jam

== Main telecast ==
=== Performers ===
The following performed:

Artist(s)	Song(s)
Bruce Springsteen; The E Street Band	"We Take Care of Our Own"
Bruno Mars	"Runaway Baby"
Alicia Keys; Bonnie Raitt	Tribute to Etta James "A Sunday Kind of Love"
Chris Brown	"Turn Up the Music" "Beautiful People"
Jason Aldean; Kelly Clarkson	"Don't You Wanna Stay"
Foo Fighters	"Walk"
Rihanna; Coldplay	"We Found Love" "Princess of China" "Paradise"
Maroon 5 Foster the People; The Beach Boys	Celebrating the Beach Boys' 50th anniversary "Surfer Girl" "Wouldn't It Be Nice" "Good Vibrations"
Paul McCartney; Diana Krall; Joe Walsh	"My Valentine"
The Civil Wars	"Barton Hollow"
Taylor Swift	"Mean"
Katy Perry	"E.T." "Part of Me"
Adele	"Rolling in the Deep"
The Band Perry; Blake Shelton; Glen Campbell	Homage to Glen Campbell "Gentle on My Mind" "Southern Nights" "Rhinestone Cowboy"
Tony Bennett; Carrie Underwood	"It Had to Be You"
Jennifer Hudson	Tribute to Whitney Houston "I Will Always Love You"
Chris Brown; David Guetta; Lil Wayne; Foo Fighters deadmau5	"I Can Only Imagine" "Rope" "Raise Your Weapon"
Nicki Minaj	"Roman's Revenge" (Intro) "Roman Holiday"
Paul McCartney; Bruce Springsteen; Dave Grohl; Joe Walsh; Rusty Anderson; Brian Ray; Paul Wickens; Abe Laboriel Jr.	"Golden Slumbers" "Carry That Weight" "The End"

- Maceo Parker was scheduled to pay tribute to Clarence Clemons following the montage of those that had died in 2011 although his tribute was dropped in the 24 hours leading up to the awards show to make room for the Jennifer Hudson tribute to Whitney Houston.

=== Presenters ===
- Alicia Keys & Bonnie Raitt - presented Best Pop Solo Performance
- LL Cool J - introduced Chris Brown
- Fergie & Marc Anthony - presented Best Rap Performance
- Reba McEntire - introduced Jason Aldean and Kelly Clarkson
- Jack Black - introduced the Foo Fighters
- LL Cool J - introduced Rihanna and Coldplay
- Mario Manningham, Victor Cruz & Pauley Perrette - presented Best Rock Performance
- Ryan Seacrest - paid tribute to the Beach Boys and introduced Maroon 5, Foster the People, and the remaining members of the Beach Boys
- Stevie Wonder - played Love Me Do on the harmonica and introduced Paul McCartney.
- Common & Taraji P. Henson - paid tribute to Gil Scott-Heron and presented Best R&B Album
- The Civil Wars - introduced Taylor Swift
- Neil Patrick Harris - presented Song of the Year
- LL Cool J & Kate Beckinsale - introduced Katy Perry
- Miranda Lambert & Dierks Bentley - presented Best Country Album
- Gwyneth Paltrow & Ceelo Green - introduced Adele
- Taylor Swift - presented the Glen Campbell tribute and introduced Blake Shelton, The Band Perry, and Glen Campbell
- Carrie Underwood & Tony Bennett - presented Best New Artist
- LL Cool J & Questlove - introduced Chris Brown, David Guetta, Deadmau5, and the Foo Fighters
- Drake - introduced Nicki Minaj
- Lady Antebellum - presented Record of the Year
- LL Cool J & Diana Ross - presented Album of the Year

== Nominees and winners ==
The winners per category were:

=== General ===
Record of the Year

- "Rolling in the Deep" – Adele
  - Paul Epworth, producer; Tom Elmhirst & Mark Rankin, engineers/mixers
- "Holocene" – Bon Iver
  - Justin Vernon, producer; Brian Joseph & Justin Vernon, engineers/mixers
- "Grenade" – Bruno Mars
  - The Smeezingtons, producers; Ari Levine & Manny Marroquin, engineers/mixers
- "The Cave" – Mumford & Sons
  - Markus Dravs, producer; Francois Chevallier & Ruadhri Cushnan, engineers/mixers
- "Firework" – Katy Perry
  - Stargate & Sandy Vee, producers; Mikkel S. Eriksen, Phil Tan, Sandy Vee & Miles Walker, engineers/mixers

Album of the Year

- 21 – Adele
  - Ryan Tedder, Jim Abbiss, Adele Adkins, Paul Epworth, Rick Rubin, Fraser T Smith & Dan Wilson, producers; Jim Abbiss, Philip Allen, Beatriz Artola, Ian Dowling, Tom Elmhirst, Greg Fidelman, Dan Parry, Steve Price, Mark Rankin, Andrew Scheps, Fraser T Smith & Ryan Tedder, engineers/mixers; Tom Coyne, mastering engineer
- Wasting Light – Foo Fighters
  - Butch Vig, producer; James Brown & Alan Moulder, engineers/mixers; Joe LaPorta & Emily Lazar, mastering engineers
- Born This Way – Lady Gaga
  - Paul Blair, DJ Snake, Fernando Garibay, Lady Gaga, Robert John "Mutt" Lange, Jeppe Laursen, RedOne & Clinton Sparks, producers; Fernando Garibay, Lady Gaga, Bill Malina, Trevor Muzzy, RedOne, Dave Russell, Justin Shirley Smith, Horace Ward & Tom Ware, engineers/mixers; Gene Grimaldi, mastering engineer
- Doo-Wops & Hooligans – Bruno Mars
  - B.o.B, Cee Lo Green & Damian Marley, featured artists; Dwayne "Supa Dups" Chin-Quee, Needlz & The Smeezingtons, producers; Ari Levine & Manny Marroquin, engineers/mixers; Stephen Marcussen, mastering engineer
- Loud – Rihanna
  - Drake, Eminem & Nicki Minaj, featured artists; Ester Dean, Alex da Kid, Kuk Harrell, Mel & Mus, Awesome Jones, Makeba Riddick, The Runners, Sham, Soundz, Stargate, Chris "Tricky" Stewart, Sandy Vee & Willy Will, producers; Ariel Chobaz, Cary Clark, Mikkel S. Eriksen, Alex da Kid, Josh Gudwin, Kuk Harrell, Jaycen Joshua, Manny Marroquin, Dana Nielsen, Chad "C-Note" Roper, Noah "40" Shebib, Corey Shoemaker, Jay Stevenson, Mike Strange, Phil Tan, Brian "B-Luv" Thomas, Marcos Tovar, Sandy Vee, Jeff "Supa Jeff" Villanueva, Miles Walker & Andrew Wuepper, engineers/mixers; Chris Gehringer, mastering engineer

Song of the Year

- "Rolling in the Deep"
  - Adele Adkins & Paul Epworth, songwriters (Adele)
- "All of the Lights"
  - Jeff Bhasker, Stacy Ferguson, Really Doe, Kanye West & Malik Yusef, songwriters (Kanye West featuring Rihanna, Kid Cudi & Fergie)
- "The Cave"
  - Ted Dwane, Ben Lovett, Marcus Mumford & Country Winston, songwriters (Mumford & Sons)
- "Grenade"
  - Brody Brown, Claude Kelly, The Smeezingtons & Andrew Wyatt, songwriters (Bruno Mars)
- "Holocene"
  - Justin Vernon, songwriter (Bon Iver)

Best New Artist

- Bon Iver
- The Band Perry
- J. Cole
- Nicki Minaj
- Skrillex

=== Pop ===
Best Pop Solo Performance

- "Someone like You" – Adele
- "Yoü and I" – Lady Gaga
- "Grenade" – Bruno Mars
- "Firework" – Katy Perry
- "Fuckin' Perfect" – P!nk

Best Pop Duo/Group Performance

- "Body and Soul" – Tony Bennett & Amy Winehouse
- "Dearest" – The Black Keys
- "Paradise" – Coldplay
- "Pumped Up Kicks" – Foster the People
- "Moves Like Jagger" – Maroon 5 & Christina Aguilera

Best Pop Instrumental Album

- The Road from Memphis – Booker T. Jones
- Wish Upon a Star: A Tribute to the Music of Walt Disney – Jenny Oaks Baker
- E Kahe Malie – Daniel Ho
- Hello Tomorrow – Dave Koz
- Setzer Goes Instru-Mental! – Brian Setzer

Best Pop Vocal Album

- 21 – Adele
- The Lady Killer – Cee Lo Green
- Born This Way – Lady Gaga
- Doo-Wops & Hooligans – Bruno Mars
- Loud – Rihanna

=== Dance/Electronic ===
Best Dance Recording

- "Scary Monsters and Nice Sprites" – Skrillex

Sonny Moore, producer & mixer

- "Raise Your Weapon" – deadmau5 featuring Greta Svabo Bech
  - Joel Zimmerman, producer
- "Barbra Streisand" – Duck Sauce
  - Armand Van Helden & Alain Macklovitch, producers; Armand van Helden & Alain Macklovitch, mixers
- "Sunshine" – David Guetta & Avicii
  - Tim Bergling, David Guetta & Giorgio Tuinfort, producers; Tim Bergling, mixer
- "Call Your Girlfriend" – Robyn
  - Klas Åhlund & Billboard, producers; Niklas Flyckt, mixer
- "Save the World" – Swedish House Mafia
  - Steve Angello, Axel Hedfors & Sebastian Ingrosso, producers; Steve Angello, Axel Hedfors & Sebastian Ingrosso, mixers

Best Dance/Electronic Album

- Scary Monsters and Nice Sprites – Skrillex
- Zonoscope – Cut Copy
- 4x4=12 – deadmau5
- Nothing but the Beat – David Guetta
- Body Talk Pt. 3 – Robyn

=== Traditional Pop ===
Best Traditional Pop Vocal Album

- Duets II – Tony Bennett
- The Gift – Susan Boyle
- In Concert on Broadway – Harry Connick, Jr.
- Music Is Better Than Words – Seth MacFarlane
- What Matters Most – Barbra Streisand

=== Rock ===
Best Rock Performance

- "Walk" – Foo Fighters
- "Every Teardrop Is a Waterfall" – Coldplay
- "Down By the Water" – The Decemberists
- "The Cave" – Mumford & Sons
- "Lotus Flower" – Radiohead

Best Hard Rock/Metal Performance

- "White Limo" – Foo Fighters
- "On the Backs of Angels" – Dream Theater
- "Curl of the Burl" – Mastodon
- "Public Enemy No. 1" – Megadeth
- "Blood in My Eyes" – Sum 41

Best Rock Song

- "Walk" – Foo Fighters
  - Foo Fighters songwriters
- "The Cave" – Mumford & Sons
  - Mumford & Sons, songwriters
- "Down By the Water" – The Decemberists
  - Colin Meloy, songwriter
- "Every Teardrop Is a Waterfall" – Coldplay
  - Coldplay, songwriters
- "Lotus Flower" – Radiohead,
  - Radiohead songwriters

Best Rock Album

- Wasting Light – Foo Fighters
- Rock 'n' Roll Party (Honoring Les Paul) – Jeff Beck
- Come Around Sundown – Kings of Leon
- I'm With You – Red Hot Chili Peppers
- The Whole Love – Wilco

=== Alternative ===
Best Alternative Music Album

- Bon Iver – Bon Iver
- Codes and Keys – Death Cab for Cutie
- Torches – Foster the People
- Circuital – My Morning Jacket
- The King of Limbs – Radiohead

=== R&B ===
Best R&B Performance

- "Is This Love" – Corinne Bailey Rae
- "Far Away" – Marsha Ambrosius
- "Pieces of Me" – Ledisi
- "Not My Daddy" – Kelly Price & Stokley Williams
- "You Are" – Charlie Wilson

Best Traditional R&B Performance

- "Fool for You" – Cee Lo Green featuring Melanie Fiona
- "Sometimes I Cry" – Eric Benét
- "Radio Message" – R. Kelly
- "Good Man" – Raphael Saadiq
- "Surrender" – Betty Wright & The Roots

Best R&B Song

- "Fool for You"
  - Cee Lo Green, Melanie Fiona, & Jack Splash, songwriters (Cee Lo Green featuring Melanie Fiona)
- "Far Away"
  - Marsha Ambrosius, Sterling Simms & Justin Smith, songwriters (Marsha Ambrosius)
- "Not My Daddy"
  - Kelly Price, songwriter (Kelly Price featuring Stokley Williams)
- "Pieces of Me"
  - Chuck Harmony, Claude Kelly & Ledisi, songwriters (Ledisi)
- "You Are"
  - Dennis Bettis, Carl M. Days, Jr., Wirlie Morris, Charlie Wilson & Mahin Wilson, songwriters (Charlie Wilson)

Best R&B Album

- F.A.M.E. – Chris Brown
- Second Chance – El DeBarge
- Love Letter – R. Kelly
- Pieces of Me – Ledisi
- Kelly – Kelly Price

=== Rap ===
Best Rap Performance

- "Otis" – Jay-Z & Kanye West
- "Look at Me Now" – Chris Brown, Lil Wayne & Busta Rhymes
- "The Show Goes On" – Lupe Fiasco
- "Moment 4 Life" – Nicki Minaj & Drake
- "Black and Yellow" – Wiz Khalifa

Best Rap/Sung Collaboration

- "All of the Lights" – Kanye West featuring Rihanna, & Kid Cudi
- "Party" – Beyoncé & André 3000
- "I'm On One" – DJ Khaled, Drake, Rick Ross & Lil Wayne
- "I Need a Doctor" – Dr. Dre, Eminem & Skylar Grey
- "What's My Name?" – Rihanna & Drake
- "Motivation" – Kelly Rowland & Lil Wayne

Best Rap Song

- "All of the Lights"
  - Jeff Bhasker, Really Doe, Kanye West & Malik Yusef, songwriters (Kanye West featuring Rihanna & Kid Cudi)
- "Black and Yellow"
  - Wiz Khalifa & Stargate, songwriters (Wiz Khalifa)
- "I Need a Doctor"
  - Alex da Kid, Dr. Dre, Eminem & Skylar Grey, songwriters (Dr. Dre featuring Eminem & Skylar Grey)
- "Look at Me Now"
  - Jean Baptiste, Chris Brown, Ryan Buendia, Diplo, Lil Wayne & Busta Rhymes, songwriters (Chris Brown featuring Lil Wayne & Busta Rhymes)
- "Otis"
  - Jay-Z & Kanye West, songwriters (with James Brown, Jimmy Campbell, Reg Connelly, Roy Hammond, J. Roach, Kirk Robinson & Harry M. Woods, songwriters) (Jay-Z & Kanye West) (featuring Otis Redding)
- "The Show Goes On"
  - Dustin William Brower, Jonathon Keith Brown, Daniel Johnson, Kane & Lupe Fiasco, songwriters (with Isaac Brock, Dann Gallucci & Eric Judy, songwriters) (Lupe Fiasco)

Best Rap Album

- My Beautiful Dark Twisted Fantasy – Kanye West
- Watch the Throne – Jay-Z & Kanye West
- Tha Carter IV – Lil Wayne
- Lasers – Lupe Fiasco
- Pink Friday – Nicki Minaj

=== Country ===
Best Country Solo Performance

- "Mean" – Taylor Swift
- "Dirt Road Anthem" – Jason Aldean
- "I'm Gonna Love You Through It" – Martina McBride
- "Honey Bee" – Blake Shelton
- "Mama's Song" – Carrie Underwood

Best Country Duo/Group Performance

- "Barton Hollow" – The Civil Wars
- "Don't You Wanna Stay" – Jason Aldean & Kelly Clarkson
- "You and Tequila" – Kenny Chesney featuring Grace Potter
- "Are You Gonna Kiss Me or Not" – Thompson Square

Best Country Song

- "Mean"
  - Taylor Swift, songwriter (Taylor Swift)
- "Are You Gonna Kiss Me or Not"
  - Jim Collins & David Lee Murphy, songwriters (Thompson Square)
- "God Gave Me You"
  - Dave Barnes, songwriter (Blake Shelton)
- "Just Fishin'"
  - Casey Beathard, Monty Criswell & Ed Hill, songwriters (Trace Adkins)
- "Threaten Me with Heaven"
  - Vince Gill, Amy Grant, Will Owsley & Dillon O'Brian, songwriters (Vince Gill)
- "You and Tequila"
  - Matraca Berg & Deana Carter, songwriters (Kenny Chesney featuring Grace Potter)

Best Country Album

- Own the Night – Lady Antebellum
- My Kinda Party – Jason Aldean
- Chief – Eric Church
- Red River Blue – Blake Shelton
- Here for a Good Time – George Strait
- Speak Now – Taylor Swift

=== New Age ===
Best New Age Album

- What's It All About – Pat Metheny
- Northern Seas – Al Conti
- Gaia – Michael Brant DeMaria
- Wind, Rock, Sea & Flame – Peter Kater
- Instrumental Oasis, Vol. 6 – Zamora

=== Jazz ===
Best Improvised Jazz Solo

- "500 Miles High" – Chick Corea
- "All or Nothing at All" – Randy Brecker
- "You Are My Sunshine" – Ron Carter
- "Work" – Fred Hersch
- "Sonnymoon for Two" – Sonny Rollins

Best Jazz Vocal Album

- The Mosaic Project – Terri Lyne Carrington & Various Artists
- 'Round Midnight – Karrin Allyson
- The Gate – Kurt Elling
- American Road – Tierney Sutton (Band)
- The Music of Randy Newman – Roseanna Vitro

Best Jazz Instrumental Album

- Forever – Corea, Clarke & White
- Bond: The Paris Sessions – Gerald Clayton
- Alone at the Vanguard – Fred Hersch
- Bird Songs – Joe Lovano & Us Five
- Road Shows Vol. 2 – Sonny Rollins
- Timeline – Yellowjackets

Best Large Jazz Ensemble Album

- The Good Feeling – Christian McBride Big Band
- The Jazz Ballad Song Book – Randy Brecker with DR Big Band
- 40 Acres and a Burro – Arturo O'Farrill & The Afro Latin Jazz Orchestra
- Legacy – Gerald Wilson Orchestra
- Alma Adentro: The Puerto Rican Songbook – Miguel Zenón

=== Gospel/Contemporary Christian ===
Best Gospel/Contemporary Christian Music Performance

- "Jesus" – Le'Andria Johnson
- "Do Everything" – Steven Curtis Chapman
- "Alive (Mary Magdalene)" – Natalie Grant
- "Your Love" – Brandon Heath
- "I Lift My Hands" – Chris Tomlin

Best Gospel Song

- "Hello Fear"
  - Kirk Franklin, songwriter (Kirk Franklin)
- "Sitting with Me"
  - Gerald Haddon, Tammi Haddon & Mary Mary, songwriters (Mary Mary)
- "Spiritual"
  - Donald Lawrence, songwriter (Donald Lawrence & Co. featuring Blanche McAllister-Dykes)
- "Trust Me"
  - Richard Smallwood, songwriter (Richard Smallwood & Vision)
- "Window"
  - Canton Jones, songwriter (Canton Jones)

Best Contemporary Christian Music Song

- "Blessings"
  - Laura Story, songwriter (Laura Story)
- "Hold Me"
  - Jamie Grace, Christopher Stevens & tobyMac, songwriters (Jamie Grace featuring tobyMac)
- "I Lift My Hands"
  - Louie Giglio, Matt Maher & Chris Tomlin, songwriters (Chris Tomlin)
- "Strong Enough"
  - Matthew West, songwriter (Matthew West)
- "Your Love"
  - Brandon Heath & Jason Ingram, songwriters (Brandon Heath)

Best Gospel Album

- Hello Fear – Kirk Franklin
- The Love Album – Kim Burrell
- The Journey – Andraé Crouch
- Something Big – Mary Mary
- Angel & Chanelle (Deluxe Edition) – Trin-i-tee 5:7

Best Contemporary Christian Music Album

- And If Our God Is for Us... – Chris Tomlin
- Ghosts Upon the Earth – Gungor
- Leaving Eden – Brandon Heath
- The Great Awakening – Leeland
- What If We Were Real – Mandisa
- Black & White – Royal Tailor

=== Latin ===
Best Latin Pop, Rock or Urban Album

- Drama y Luz – Maná
- Entren Los Que Quieran – Calle 13
- Entre La Ciudad Y El Mar – Gustavo Galindo
- Nuestra – La Vida Bohème
- Not So Commercial – Los Amigos Invisibles

Best Regional Mexican or Tejano Album

- Bicentenario – Pepe Aguilar
- Órale – Mariachi Divas de Cindy Shea
- Amor A La Musica – Mariachi Los Arrieros Del Valle
- Eres Un Farsante – Paquita la del Barrio
- Huevos Rancheros – Joan Sebastian

Best Banda or Norteño Album

- MTV Unplugged: Los Tigres del Norte and Friends – Los Tigres del Norte
- Estare Mejor – El Guero Y Su Banda Centenario
- Intocable 2011 – Intocable
- El Árbol – Los Tucanes de Tijuana
- No Vengo A Ver Si Puedo ... Si Por Que Puedo Vengo – Michael Salgado

Best Tropical Latin Album

- The Last Mambo – Cachao
- Homenaje A Los Rumberos – Edwin Bonilla
- Mongorama – José Rizo's Mongorama

=== American Roots Music ===
Best Americana Album

- Ramble at the Ryman – Levon Helm
- Emotional Jukebox – Linda Chorney
- Pull Up Some Dust and Sit Down – Ry Cooder
- Hard Bargain – Emmylou Harris
- Blessed – Lucinda Williams

Best Bluegrass Album

- Paper Airplane – Alison Krauss & Union Station
- Reason and Rhyme: Bluegrass Songs by Robert Hunter and Jim Lauderdale – Jim Lauderdale
- Rare Bird Alert – Steve Martin & Steep Canyon Rangers
- Old Memories: The Songs of Bill Monroe – Del McCoury Band
- A Mother's Prayer – Ralph Stanley
- Sleep with One Eye Open – Chris Thile & Michael Daves

Best Blues Album

- Revelator – Tedeschi Trucks Band
- Low Country Blues – Gregg Allman
- Roadside Attractions – Marcia Ball
- Man in Motion – Warren Haynes
- The Reflection – Keb' Mo'

Best Folk Album

- Barton Hollow – The Civil Wars
- I'll Never Get Out of This World Alive – Steve Earle
- Helplessness Blues – Fleet Foxes
- Ukulele Songs – Eddie Vedder
- The Harrow & The Harvest – Gillian Welch

Best Regional Roots Music Album

- Rebirth of New Orleans – Rebirth Brass Band
- Can't Sit Down – C.J. Chenier
- Wao Akua: The Forest of the Gods – George Kahumoku, Jr.
- Grand Isle – Steve Riley & the Mamou Playboys
- Not Just Another Polka – Jimmy Sturr & His Orchestra

=== Reggae ===
Best Reggae Album

- Revelation Pt. 1 – The Root of Life – Stephen Marley
- Harlem-Kingston Express Live! – Monty Alexander
- Reggae Knights – Israel Vibration
- Wild and Free – Ziggy Marley
- Summer in Kingston – Shaggy

=== World Music ===
Best World Music Album

- Tassili – Tinariwen
- AfroCubism – AfroCubism
- Africa for Africa – Femi Kuti
- Songs from a Zulu Farm – Ladysmith Black Mambazo

=== Children's ===
Best Children's Album

- All About Bullies ... Big and Small – Steve Pullara, Jim Cravero, Pat Robinson, Kevin Mackie and Gloria Domina, producers (Various Artists)
- Are We There Yet? – The Papa Hugs Band
- Fitness Rock & Roll – Miss Amy
- GulfAlive – The Banana Plant
- I Love: Tom T. Hall's Songs of Fox Hollow – Various Artists

=== Spoken Word ===
Best Spoken Word Album (Includes Poetry, Audio Books & Story Telling)

- If You Ask Me (And of Course You Won't) – Betty White
- Bossypants – Tina Fey
- Fab Fan Memories – The Beatles Bond – Various Artists
- Hamlet (William Shakespeare) – Dan Donohue & Various Artists – Oregon Shakespeare Festival
- The Mark of Zorro – Val Kilmer & Cast

=== Comedy ===
Best Comedy Album

- Hilarious – Louis C.K.
- Alpocalypse – "Weird Al" Yankovic
- Finest Hour – Patton Oswalt
- Kathy Griffin: 50 & Not Pregnant – Kathy Griffin
- Turtleneck & Chain – The Lonely Island

=== Musical Show ===
Best Musical Theater Album

- The Book of Mormon: Original Broadway Cast Recording
  - Josh Gad & Andrew Rannells, principal soloists; Anne Garefino, Robert Lopez, Stephen Oremus, Trey Parker, Scott Rudin & Matt Stone, producers; Robert Lopez, Trey Parker & Matt Stone, composers/lyricists
- Anything Goes – New Broadway Cast Recording
  - Sutton Foster & Joel Grey, principal soloists; Rob Fisher, James Lowe & Joel Moss, producers (Cole Porter, composer/lyricist)
- How to Succeed in Business Without Really Trying – The 2011 Broadway Cast Recording
  - John Larroquette & Daniel Radcliffe, principal soloists; Robert Sher, producer (Frank Loesser, composer/lyricist)

=== Music for Visual Media ===
Best Compilation Soundtrack for Visual Media

- Boardwalk Empire Volume 1: Music from the HBO Original Series – Various Artists
- Burlesque – Christina Aguilera
- Glee: The Music, Volume 4 – Glee Cast
- Tangled – Various Artists
- True Blood Volume 3 – Various Artists

Best Score Soundtrack for Visual Media

- The King's Speech
  - Alexandre Desplat, composer
- Black Swan
  - Clint Mansell, composer
- Harry Potter and the Deathly Hallows Part 2
  - Alexandre Desplat, composer
- The Shrine
  - Ryan Shore, composer
- Tron: Legacy
  - Daft Punk, composers

Best Song Written for Visual Media

- "I See the Light" (from Tangled)
  - Alan Menken & Glenn Slater, songwriters (Mandy Moore & Zachary Levi)
- "Born to Be Somebody" (from Justin Bieber: Never Say Never)
  - Diane Warren, songwriter (Justin Bieber)
- "Christmastime Is Killing Us" (from Family Guy)
  - Ron Jones, Seth MacFarlane & Danny Smith, songwriters (Bruce McGill & Seth MacFarlane)
- "So Long" (from Winnie the Pooh)
  - Zooey Deschanel, songwriter (Zooey Deschanel & M. Ward)
- "Where the River Goes" (from Footloose)
  - Zac Brown, Wyatt Durrette, Drew Pearson & Anne Preven, songwriters (Zac Brown)
- "You Haven't Seen the Last of Me" (from Burlesque)
  - Diane Warren, songwriter (Cher)

=== Composing/Arranging ===
Best Instrumental Composition

- "Life in Eleven"
  - Béla Fleck & Howard Levy, composers (Béla Fleck and the Flecktones)
- "Falling Men"
  - John Hollenbeck, composer (John Hollenbeck, Daniel Yvinec & Orchestre National de Jazz (ONJ))
- "Hunting Wabbits 3 (Get Off My Lawn)"
  - Gordon Goodwin, composer (Gordon Goodwin's Big Phat Band)
- "I Talk to the Trees"
  - Randy Brecker, composer (Randy Brecker with DR Big Band)
- "Timeline"
  - Russell Ferrante, composer (Yellowjackets)

Best Instrumental Arrangement

- "Rhapsody in Blue"
  - Gordon Goodwin, arranger (Gordon Goodwin's Big Phat Band)
- "All or Nothing at All"
  - Peter Jensen, arranger (Randy Brecker with DR Big Band)
- "In the Beginning"
  - Clare Fischer, arranger (The Clare Fischer Big Band)
- "Nasty Dance"
  - Bob Brookmeyer, arranger (The Vanguard Jazz Orchestra)
- "Song Without Words"
  - Carlos Franzetti, arranger (Carlos Franzetti & Allison Brewster Franzetti)

Best Instrumental Arrangement Accompanying Vocalist(s)

- "Who Can I Turn To (When Nobody Needs Me)"
  - Jorge Calandrelli, arranger (Tony Bennett & Queen Latifah)
- "Ao Mar"
  - Vince Mendoza, arranger (Vince Mendoza)
- "Moon Over Bourbon Street"
  - Rob Mathes, arranger (Sting & Royal Philharmonic Concert Orchestra)
- "On Broadway"
  - Kevin Axt, Ray Brinker, Trey Henry, Christian Jacob & Tierney Sutton, arrangers (The Tierney Sutton Band)
- "The Windmills of Your Mind"
  - William A. Ross, arranger (Barbra Streisand)

=== Package ===
Best Recording Package

- Scenes from The Suburbs
  - Vincent Morisset, art director (Arcade Fire)
- Chickenfoot III
  - Todd Gallopo, art director (Chickenfoot)
- Good Luck & True Love
  - Sarah Dodds & Shauna Dodds, art directors (Reckless Kelly)
- Rivers and Homes
  - Jonathan Dagan, art director (J.Viewz)
- Watch the Throne
  - Virgil Abloh, art director (Jay-Z & Kanye West)

Best Boxed or Special Limited Edition Package

- The Promise: The Darkness on the Edge of Town Story
  - Dave Bett & Michelle Holme, art directors (Bruce Springsteen)
- The King of Limbs
  - Donald Twain & Zachariah Wildwood, art directors (Radiohead)
- 25th Anniversary Music Box
  - Matt Taylor & Ellen Wakayama, art directors (Danny Elfman & Tim Burton)
- 25 Years
  - James Spindler, art director (Sting)
- Wingless Angels (Deluxe Edition)
  - David Gorman, art director (Wingless Angels)

=== Notes ===
Best Album Notes

- Hear Me Howling!: Blues, Ballads & Beyond as Recorded by the San Francisco Bay by Chris Strachwitz in the 1960s
  - Adam Machado, album notes writer (Various Artists)
- The Bang Years 1966-1968
  - Neil Diamond, album notes writer (Neil Diamond)
- The Bristol Sessions, 1927–1928: The Big Bang of Country Music
  - Ted Olson & Tony Russell, album notes writers (Various Artists)
- Complete Mythology
  - Ken Shipley, album notes writer (Syl Johnson)
- The Music City Story: Street Corner Doo Wop, Raw R&B and Soulful Sounds from Berkeley, California 1950–75
  - Alec Palao, album notes writer (Various Artists)

=== Historical ===
Best Historical Album

- Band on the Run (Paul McCartney Archive Collection – Deluxe Edition)
  - Paul McCartney, compilation producer; Sam Okell & Steve Rooke, mastering engineers (Paul McCartney & Wings)
- The Bristol Sessions, 1927–1928: The Big Bang of Country Music
  - Christopher C. King & Ted Olson, compilation producers; Christopher C. King & Chris Zwarg, mastering engineers (Various Artists)
- Complete Mythology
  - Tom Lunt, Rob Sevier & Ken Shipley, compilation producers; Jeff Lipton, mastering engineer (Syl Johnson)
- Hear Me Howling!: Blues, Ballads & Beyond as Recorded by the San Francisco Bay by Chris Strachwitz in the 1960s
  - Chris Strachwitz, compilation producer; Mike Cogan, mastering engineer (Various Artists)
- Young Man with the Big Beat: The Complete '56 Elvis Presley Masters
  - Ernst Mikael Jorgensen, compilation producer; Vic Anesini, mastering engineer (Elvis Presley)

=== Production ===
Best Engineered Album, Non-Classical

- Paper Airplane
  - Mike Shipley, engineer; Brad Blackwood, mastering engineer (Alison Krauss & Union Station)
- Follow Me Down
  - Brandon Bell & Gary Paczosa, engineers; Sangwook "Sunny" Nam & Doug Sax, mastering engineers (Sarah Jarosz)
- The Harrow & The Harvest
  - Matt Andrews, engineer; Stephen Marcussen, mastering engineer (Gillian Welch)
- Music Is Better Than Words
  - Rich Breen & Frank Filipetti, engineers; Bob Ludwig, mastering engineer (Seth MacFarlane)
- The Next Right Thing
  - Kevin Killen, Brendan Muldowney & John Shyloski, engineers; John Shyloski, mastering engineer (Seth Glier)

Producer of the Year, Non-Classical

- Paul Epworth
  - "Call It What You Want" (Foster the People) (T)

- "I Would Do Anything for You" (Foster the People) (T)
- "I'll Be Waiting" (Adele) (T)
- "Life on the Nickel" (Foster the People) (T)
- "No One's Gonna Love You" (Cee Lo Green) (S)
- "Rolling in the Deep" (Adele) (T)

- Danger Mouse
  - Meyrin Fields EP (Broken Bells) (S)
  - Rome (Danger Mouse & Daniele Luppi) (A)
- The Smeezingtons
  - Doo-Wops & Hooligans (Bruno Mars) (A)
  - "If I Was You (OMG)" (Far East Movement featuring Snoop Dogg) (T)
  - "Lighters" (Bad Meets Evil featuring Bruno Mars) (T)
  - "Mirror" (Lil Wayne featuring Bruno Mars) (T)
  - "Rocketeer" (Far East Movement featuring Ryan Tedder) (T)
- Ryan Tedder
  - "Brighter Than the Sun" (Colbie Caillat) (T)
  - "Favorite Song" (Colbie Caillat featuring Common) (T)
  - "I Remember Me" (Jennifer Hudson) (T)
  - "I Was Here" (Beyoncé) (T)
  - "Not Over You" (Gavin DeGraw) (S)
  - "#1Nite (One Night)" (Cobra Starship) (S)
  - "Rumour Has It" (Adele) (T)
  - "Sweeter" (Gavin DeGraw) (T)
  - "Who's That Boy" (Demi Lovato featuring Dev) (T)
- Butch Vig
  - Wasting Light (Foo Fighters) (A)

Best Remixed Recording

- "Cinema" (Skrillex Remix)
  - Skrillex, remixer (Benny Benassi & Gary Go)
- "Collide" (Afrojack Remix)
  - Afrojack, remixer (Leona Lewis & Avicii)
- "End of Line" (Photek Remix)
  - Photek, remixer (Daft Punk)
- "Only Girl (In the World)" (Rosabel Club Mix)
  - Rosabel, remixers (Rihanna)
- "Rope" (deadmau5 Mix)
  - deadmau5, remixer (Foo Fighters)

=== Production, Surround Sound ===
Best Surround Sound Album

- Layla and Other Assorted Love Songs (Super Deluxe Edition)
- Elliot Scheiner, surround mix engineer; Bob Ludwig, surround mastering engineer; Bill Levenson & Elliot Scheiner, surround producers (Derek and the Dominos)
- An Evening with Dave Grusin
  - Frank Filipetti & Eric Schilling, surround mix engineers; Frank Filipetti, surround mastering engineer; Phil Ramone, surround producer (Various Artists)
- Grace for Drowning
  - Steven Wilson, surround mix engineer; Paschal Byrne, surround mastering engineer; Steven Wilson, surround producer (Steven Wilson)
- Kind
  - Morten Lindberg, surround mix engineer; Morten Lindberg, surround mastering engineer; Morten Lindberg, surround producer (Kjetil Almenning, Ensemble 96 & Nidaros String Quartet)
- Spohr: String Sextet in C Major, Op. 140 & Nonet in F Major, Op. 31
  - Andreas Spreer, surround mix engineer; Robin Schmidt & Andreas Spreer, surround mastering engineer; Andreas Spreer, surround producer (Camerata Freden)

=== Production, Classical ===
Best Engineered Album, Classical

Aldridge: Elmer Gantry

Byeong-Joon Hwang & John Newton, engineers; Jesse Lewis, mastering engineer (William Boggs, Keith Phares, Patricia Risley, Vale Rideout, Frank Kelley, Heather Buck, Florentine Opera Chorus & Milwaukee Symphony Orchestra)

- Glazunov: Complete Concertos
  - Richard King, engineer (José Serebrier, Alexey Serov, Wen-Sinn Yang, Alexander Romanovsky, Rachel Barton Pine, Marc Chisson & Russian National Orchestra)
- Mackey: Lonely Motel – Music From Slide
  - Tom Lazarus, Mat Lejeune, Bill Maylone & Jon Zacks, engineers; Joe Lambert, mastering engineer (Rinde Eckert, Steven Mackey & Eighth Blackbird)
- Rachmaninov: Piano Concertos Nos. 3 & 4
  - Arne Akselberg, engineer (Leif Ove Andsnes, Antonio Pappano & London Symphony Orchestra)
- Weinberg: Symphony No. 3 & Suite No. 4 From 'The Golden Key'
  - Torbjörn Samuelsson, engineer (Thord Svedlund & Gothenburg Symphony Orchestra)

Producer of the Year, Classical

Judith Sherman

- Adams: Son of Chamber Symphony; String Quartet (John Adams, St. Lawrence String Quartet & International Contemporary Ensemble)
- Capricho Latino (Rachel Barton Pine)
- 85th Birthday Celebration (Claude Frank)
- Insects & Paper Airplanes – Chamber Music of Lawrence Dillon (Daedalus Quartet & Benjamin Hochman)
- Midnight Frolic – The Broadway Theater Music of Louis A. Hirsch (Rick Benjamin & Paragon Ragtime Orchestra)
- Notable Women – Trios by Today's Female Composers (Lincoln Trio)
- The Soviet Experience, Vol. 1 – String Quartets by Dmitri Shostakovich & His Contemporaries (Pacifica Quartet)
- Speak! (Anthony De Mare)
- State of the Art – The American Brass Quintet at 50 (The American Brass Quintet)
- Steve Reich: WTC 9/11; Mallet Quartet; Dance Patterns (Kronos Quartet, Steve Reich Musicians & So Percussion)
- Winging It – Piano Music of John Corigliano (Ursula Oppens)

- Blanton Alspaugh
  - Aldridge: Elmer Gantry (William Boggs, Keith Phares, Patricia Risley, Vale Rideout, Frank Kelley, Heather Buck, Florentine Opera Chorus & Milwaukee Symphony Orchestra)
  - Beethoven: Complete Piano Sonatas (Peter Takács)
  - Osterfield: Rocky Streams (Paul Osterfield, Todd Waldecker & Various Artists)
- Manfred Eicher
  - Bach: Concertos & Sinfonias for Oboe; Ich Hatte Viel Bekümmernis (Heinz Holliger, Eric Höbarth & Camerata Bern)
  - Hymns & Prayers (Gidon Kremer & Kremerata Baltica)
  - Manto & Madrigals (Thomas Zehetmair & Ruth Killius)
  - Songs of Ascension (Meredith Monk & Vocal Ensemble, Todd Reynolds Quartet, The M6 & Montclair State University Singers)
  - Tchaikovsky/Kissine: Piano Trios (Gidon Kremer, Giedre Dirvanauskaite & Khatia Buniatishvili)
  - A Worcester Ladymass (Trio Mediaeval)
- David Frost
  - Chicago Symphony Orchestra Brass Live (Chicago Symphony Orchestra Brass)
  - Mackey: Lonely Motel – Music from Slide (Rinde Eckert, Steven Mackey & Eighth Blackbird)
  - Prayers & Alleluias (Kenneth Dake)
  - Sharon Isbin & Friends – Guitar Passions (Sharon Isbin & Various Artists)
- Peter Rutenberg
  - Brahms: Ein Deutsches Requiem, Op. 45 (Patrick Dupré Quigley, James K. Bass, Seraphic Fire & Professional Choral Institute)
  - The Vanishing Nordic Chorale (Philip Spray & Musik Ekklesia)

=== Classical ===
Best Orchestral Performance

"Brahms: Symphony No. 4"

Gustavo Dudamel, conductor (Los Angeles Philharmonic)

- "Bowen: Symphonies Nos. 1 & 2"
  - Andrew Davis, conductor (BBC Philharmonic)
- "Haydn: Symphonies 104, 88 & 101"
  - Nicholas McGegan, conductor (Philharmonia Baroque Orchestra)
- "Henze: Symphonies Nos. 3–5"
  - Marek Janowski, conductor (Rundfunk-Sinfonieorchester Berlin)
- Martinu: The 6 Symphonies
  - Jirí Belohlávek, conductor (BBC Symphony Orchestra)

Best Opera Recording

"Adams: Doctor Atomic"

Alan Gilbert, conductor; Meredith Arwady, Sasha Cooke, Richard Paul Fink, Gerald Finley, Thomas Glenn & Eric Owens; Jay David Saks, producer (Metropolitan Opera Orchestra; Metropolitan Opera Chorus)

- "Britten: Billy Budd"
  - Mark Elder, conductor; John Mark Ainsley, Phillip Ens, Jacques Imbrailo, Darren Jeffery, Iain Paterson & Matthew Rose; James Whitbourn, producer (London Philharmonic Orchestra; Glyndebourne Chorus)
- "Rautavaara: Kaivos"
  - Hannu Lintu, conductor; Jaakko Kortekangas, Hannu Niemelä, Johanna Rusanen-Kartano & Mati Turi; Seppo Siirala, producer (Tampere Philharmonic Orchestra; Kaivos Chorus)
- "Verdi: La Traviata"
  - Antonio Pappano, conductor; Joseph Calleja, Renée Fleming & Thomas Hampson; James Whitbourn, producer (Orchestra of the Royal Opera House; Royal Opera Chorus)
- "Vivaldi: Ercole Sul Termodonte"
  - Fabio Biondi, conductor; Romina Basso, Patrizia Ciofi, Diana Damrau, Joyce DiDonato, Vivica Genaux, Philippe Jaroussky, Topi Lehtipuu & Rolando Villazón; Daniel Zalay, producer (Europa Galante; Coro Da Camera Santa Cecilia Di Borgo San Lorenzo)

Best Choral Performance

"Light & Gold"

Eric Whitacre, conductor (Christopher Glynn & Hila Plitmann; The King's Singers, Laudibus, Pavão Quartet & The Eric Whitacre Singers)

- "Beyond All Mortal Dreams – American A Cappella"
  - Stephen Layton, conductor (Choir of Trinity College Cambridge)
- "Brahms: Ein Deutsches Requiem, Op. 45"
  - Patrick Dupré Quigley, conductor; James K. Bass, chorus master (Justin Blackwell, Scott Allen Jarrett, Paul Max Tipton & Teresa Wakim; Professional Choral Institute & Seraphic Fire)
- "Kind"
  - Kjetil Almenning, conductor (Nidaros String Quartet; Ensemble 96)
- "The Natural World of Pelle Gudmundsen-Holmgreen"
  - Paul Hillier, conductor (Ars Nova Copenhagen)

Best Small Ensemble Performance

"Mackey: Lonely Motel – Music from Slide" – Rinde Eckert & Steven Mackey; Eighth Blackbird

- "Frank: Hilos" – Gabriela Lena Frank; ALIAS Chamber Ensemble
- "The Kingdoms of Castille – Richard Savino, conductor; El Mundo
- "A Seraphic Fire Christmas" – Patrick Dupré Quigley, conductor; Seraphic Fire
- "Sound the Bells!" – The Bay Brass

Best Classical Instrumental Solo

"Schwantner: Concerto for Percussion & Orchestra"

Giancarlo Guerrero, conductor; Christopher Lamb (Nashville Symphony)

- "Chinese Recorder Concertos – East Meets West"
  - Lan Shui, conductor; Michala Petri (Copenhagen Philharmonic)
- "Rachmaninov: Piano Concerto No. 2 in C Minor, Op. 18; Rhapsody on a Theme of Paganini"
  - Claudio Abbado, Yuja Wang (Mahler Chamber Orchestra)
- "Rachmaninov: Piano Concertos Nos. 3 & 4"
  - Leif Ove Andsnes, Antonio Pappano (London Symphony Orchestra)
- "Winging It – Piano Music of John Corigliano"
  - Ursula Oppens

Best Classical Vocal Solo

"Diva Divo"

Joyce DiDonato (Kazushi Ono; Orchestre De L'Opéra National De Lyon; Choeur De L'Opéra National De Lyon)

- "Grieg/Thommessen: Veslemøy Synsk"
  - Marianne Beate Kielland (Nils Anders Mortensen)
- "Handel: Cleopatra"
  - Natalie Dessay (Emmanuelle Haïm; Le Concert D'Astrée)
- "Purcell: O Solitude"
  - Andreas Scholl (Stefano Montanari; Christophe Dumaux; Accademia Bizantina)
- "Three Baroque Tenors"
  - Ian Bostridge (Bernard Labadie; Mark Bennett, Andrew Clarke, Sophie Daneman, Alberto Grazzi, Jonathan Gunthorpe, Benjamin Hulett & Madeline Shaw; The English Concert)

Best Contemporary Classical Composition

"Aldridge, Robert: Elmer Gantry" – Robert Aldridge & Herschel Garfein

- "Crumb, George: The Ghosts of Alhambra" – George Crumb
- "Friedman, Jefferson: String Quartet No. 3" – Jefferson Friedman
- "Mackey, Steven: Lonely Motel – Music From Slide" – Steven Mackey
- "Ruders, Poul: Piano Concerto No. 2" – Poul Ruders

=== Music video ===
Best Short Form Music Video

- "Rolling in the Deep" – Adele
  - Sam Brown, video director; Hannah Chandler, video producer
- "Yes I Know" – Memory Tapes
  - Eric Epstein, video director & video producer
- "All Is Not Lost" – OK Go
  - Itamar Kubovy, Damian Kulash & Trish Sie, video directors; Shirley Moyers, video producer
- "Lotus Flower" – Radiohead
  - Garth Jennings, video director & video producer
- "First of the Year (Equinox)" – Skrillex
  - Tony Truand, video director; Noah Klein, video producer
- "Perform This Way" – "Weird Al" Yankovic
  - "Weird Al" Yankovic, video director; Cisco Newman, video producer

Best Long Form Music Video

- Foo Fighters: Back and Forth – Foo Fighters
  - James Moll, video director; James Moll & Nigel Sinclair, video producers
- I Am... World Tour – Beyoncé
  - Beyoncé, Ed Burke & Frank Gatson, Jr., video directors; Beyoncé & Camille Yorrick, video producers
- Talihina Sky: The Story of Kings of Leon – Kings of Leon
  - Stephen C. Mitchell, video director; Casey McGrath, video producer
- Beats, Rhymes & Life: The Travels of a Tribe Called Quest – A Tribe Called Quest
  - Michael Rapaport, video director; Robert Benavides, Debra Koffler, Eric Matthies, Frank Mele, Edward Parks & A Tribe Called Quest, video producers
- Nine Types of Light – TV on the Radio
  - Tunde Adebimpe, video director; Michelle An & Braj, video producers

== Special Merit Awards ==
MusiCares Person of the Year

- Paul McCartney

President's Merit Award

- Sir Richard Branson

Grammy Lifetime Achievement Award

- Allman Brothers Band
- Glen Campbell
- Tom Jobim
- Roy Haynes
- George Jones
- The Memphis Horns
- Diana Ross
- Gil Scott-Heron

Grammy Trustees Award

- Dave Bartholomew
- Steve Jobs
- Rudy Van Gelder

Technical Grammy Award

- Roger Nichols
- Celemony

== Artists with multiple nominations and awards ==
The following artists received multiple nominations:

- Seven: Kanye West
- Six: Adele, Bruno Mars, Foo Fighters
- Five: Lil Wayne, Radiohead, Skrillex
- Four: Bon Iver, Drake, Jay-Z, Mumford & Sons, Nicki Minaj, Rihanna
- Three: Blake Shelton, Brandon Heath, Cee Lo Green, Chris Brown, Chris Tomlin, Coldplay, Deadmau5, Fergie, Jason Aldean, Kelly Price, Lady Gaga, Ledisi, Lupe Fiasco, Taylor Swift, Eminem
- Two: Alexandre Desplat, Beyoncé, Charlie Wilson, Christina Aguilera, Daft Punk, David Guetta, Dr. Dre, Foster the People, Gillian Welch, Katy Perry, Kenny Chesney, Kirk Franklin, Kings of Leon, Marsha Ambrosius, Mary Mary, Robyn, R. Kelly, Seth MacFarlane, Skylar Grey, Thompson Square, The Civil Wars, Tony Bennett, "Weird Al" Yankovic, Wiz Khalifa, Afrojack

The following artists received multiple awards:

- Six: Adele
- Five: Foo Fighters
- Four: Kanye West
- Three: Skrillex
- Two: Tony Bennett, Bon Iver, Cee Lo Green, Kirk Franklin, Fergie, The Civil Wars, Taylor Swift, Kid Cudi

== In Memoriam ==
Amy Winehouse, Nick Ashford, Phoebe Snow, Jerry Leiber, Steve Jobs, Heavy D, Sylvia Robinson, Nate Dogg, M-Bone, Jimmy Castor, George Shearing, Roger Williams, Ray Bryant, Gil Cates, Fred Steiner, Dobie Gray, Ferlin Husky, Larry Butler, Wilma Lee Cooper, Harley Allen, Liz Anderson, Charlie Craig, Barbara Orbison, Frank DiLeo, Steve Popovich, Tal Herzberg, Bruce Jackson, Johnny Otis, Benny Spellman, Don DeVito, Roger Nichols, Stan Ross, Joe Arroyo, Facundo Cabral, Marv Tarplin, Esther Gordy Edwards, Carl Gardner, Cornell Dupree, Jerry Ragovoy, Gene McDaniels, Joe Morello, Gil Bernal, Frank Foster, Ralph MacDonald, Leonard Dillon, Clare Fischer, Bert Jansch, Andrew Gold, Bill Morrissey, Warren Hellman, Hazel Dickens, Gary Moore, Gerard Smith, Doyle Bramhall, Pinetop Perkins, Hubert Sumlin, David "Honeyboy" Edwards, Camilla Williams, Milton Babbitt, David Mason, Andy Kazdin, Alex Steinweiss, Bill Johnson, Jessy Dixon, Don Butler, Clarence Clemons and Whitney Houston.
