= Choral Arts (disambiguation) =

Choral Arts may refer to:

- Choral Arts - An American choir based in Seattle, Washington
- Choral Arts Society of Washington
- Choral Arts Society of Philadelphia
- Baltimore Choral Arts Society
