= Chrysler Hall =

Performing arts venue in Norfolk, Virginia

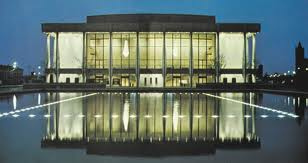
- Address: 215 Saint Pauls Boulevard; Norfolk, Virginia; United States
- Coordinates: 36°51′7.5″N 76°17′10.9″W
- Owner: City of Norfolk
- Type: Concert hall
- Capacity: 2,500
- Opened: 1972

Tenants
- Broadway in Norfolk, Virginia Symphony Orchestra, Norfolk Forum, the Virginia Arts Festival, the Virginia Ballet, and the Generic Theatre

Website
- www.sevenvenues.com

Chrysler Hall is the premier performing arts venue in Norfolk, Virginia, located in the downtown section of the city. Built in 1972 and located next to the Norfolk Scope arena, the venue is home to the Virginia Symphony Orchestra, the Virginia Ballet and hosts Broadway plays while serving as Norfolk's primary theater and concert venue. The venue also contains a studio theater in the lower levels of the complex that serves as the current home of the Generic Theater. The City of Norfolk owns and operates the venue.

It was originally designed by Pier Luigi Nervi and local architects.
