= Richard Sparks =

American choral conductor (born 1950)

Richard Andrew Sparks (born August 29, 1950) is an American choral conductor. He is one of the leading figures in choral music in the Pacific Northwest and in Scandinavian, especially Swedish a cappella choral music.

== Early life and education ==
Sparks was raised in Seattle, Washington. He graduated from Shorecrest High School, and he received a bachelor of music in 1976 and a master of music in 1980, both from the University of Washington. While an undergraduate, Sparks founded Seattle Pro Musica in 1973, which he led until 1980. During this time, Seattle Pro Musica became known as a leader in the "authentic performance" of Baroque music, especially Johann Sebastian Bach's. The organization started with a chamber choir, then the second year the Bach Ensemble was added, which did Bach cantatas and other baroque works, once a month. Finally, during the last three years, a Chamber Orchestra was added. Sparks conducted Seattle Pro Musica in Claudio Monteverdi's Vespro della Beata Vergine at St. Mark's Cathedral and Handel's Messiah. Over the course of seven years, Sparks conducted 71 different programs with those ensembles.

In the early 1980s, Sparks grew interested in Swedish choral music and the work of conductor Eric Ericson. He received doctor of musical arts in choral conducting from the University of Cincinnati College-Conservatory of Music, and his doctoral dissertation on postwar Swedish choral music was later published as The Swedish Choral Miracle.

== Conducting career ==
In 1983, Sparks became conductor of the Choir of the West and Director of Choral Activities at Pacific Lutheran University. He remained there until 2001, during which time he directed the choir in Benjamin Britten's War Requiem, Bach's Mass in B Minor and St. John Passion, Igor Stravinsky's Les Noces, Sergei Rachmaninoff's Vespers, Johannes Brahms's Liebeslieder Walzer, and Giuseppe Verdi's Requiem. During Sparks's tenure, the Choir of the West recorded five concert albums.

Sparks founded Choral Arts Northwest (later Choral Arts), a Seattle-based chamber choir, in 1993, and was its artistic director until 2006. Choral Arts is known for its repertoire of a cappella music and a sound inspired by Swedish choirs. From 1999-2011, Sparks was artistic director of Pro Coro Canada in Edmonton, where his repertoire has included (again) Monteverdi's 1610 Vespers and Bach's B Minor Mass, as well as Wolfgang Amadeus Mozart's Requiem and Gabriel Fauré's Requiem in D Minor. He received the Richard S. Eaton Award of Distinction from the Alberta Choral Federation. He also was the first non-Canadian conductor to lead the National Youth Choir of Canada in 2006.

Sparks served as the Chair for Conducting & Ensembles at the University of North Texas, and also led the University Singers, and the Collegium Singers at the school until his retirement in 2019. While at UNT, Sparks also served as the Interim Director of Music for Church of the Incarnation in Dallas from August 2011 to August 2012. In the Fall of 2013, Sparks led the Collegium singers in another performance of Monteverdi's Vespers of 1610.

Sparks has guest-conducted the National Youth Choir of Canada and was the first American in more than two decades to conduct the Swedish Radio Choir in 2002, 2007 and 2008.

In May 2021, Sparks was one of 10 new members elected to the Royal Swedish Academy of Music, alongside Marika Field, Katarina Karnéus, Jonas Knutsson, Sten Sandell, Đuro Živković, Keiko Abe, Giancarlo Andretta, Stefan Dohr, and Quincy Jones. The Academy said that "Sparks, more than any other foreign choir conductor of his generation, has been an ambassador for Swedish and Nordic choral music," and described his dissertation The Swedish Choral Miracle as the "standard work for the knowledge of Swedish music in English-speaking areas."

In 2023 Sparks was awarded The American Prize in Conducting—The Dale Warland Award in Choral Conducting (non-collegiate division)for his work with the Benedict Sixteen Singers.

The Benedict Sixteen Singers also released two CDs of music of Frank LaRocca on the Cappella Records label.

== Personal life ==
Sparks is married to the former Kathryn Wold, an artist who formerly directed the gallery at Pacific Lutheran University. Richard Nance composed "Set Me as a Seal," based on the Song of Songs, for their 1996 wedding.
