= Keiko Abe =

Japanese composer and marimba player

Keiko Abe 安倍 圭子
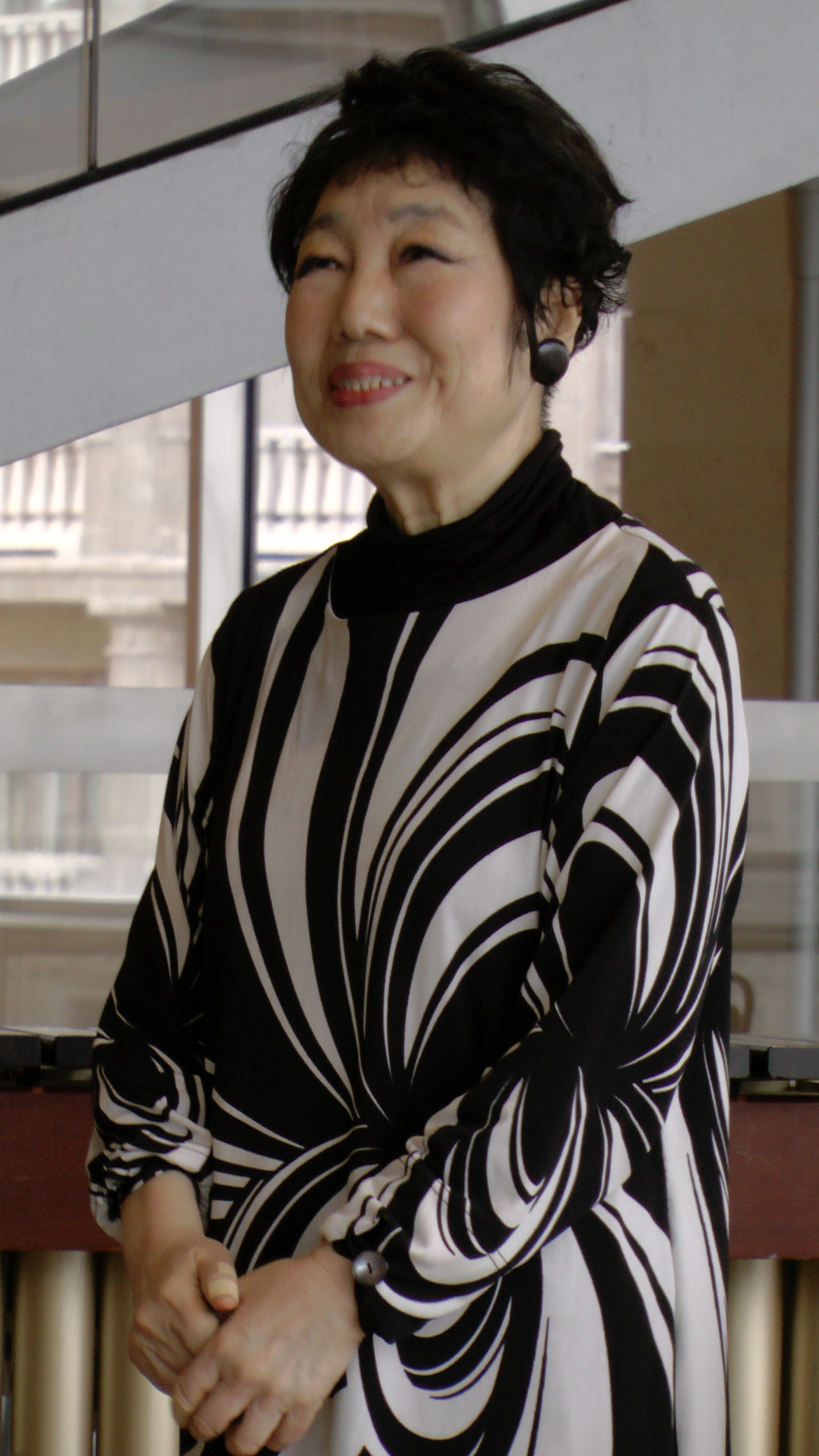

Background information
- Born: April 18, 1937 (age 89); Tokyo, Japan
- Instrument: Marimba
- Website: www.keiko-abe.jp

Keiko Abe (安倍 圭子, Abe Keiko; born April 18, 1937) is a Japanese composer and marimba player. She has been a primary figure in the development of the marimba, in terms of expanding both technique and repertoire, and through her collaboration with the Yamaha Corporation, developed the modern five-octave concert marimba.

== Early life ==
Abe began playing the xylophone while in elementary school in Tokyo, Japan, studying under Eiichi Asabuki. At age 13, she won an NHK talent contest and began performing professionally on live radio. She attended Tokyo Gakugei University where she completed a bachelor's and master's degree in music education. She began working in the Nippon Columbia, NHK, and other recording studios while in college.

== Career ==
Abe’s first encounter with a marimba took place in the early 1950s when Lawrence L. Lacour, an American missionary and professor at Oral Roberts University, brought four marimbas to Japan. In 1962, she and two friends (who were also students of Asabuki) founded the Xebec Marimba Trio, performing popular music, arrangements of folk songs and some of Abe's arrangements. They recorded more than seven albums between 1962 and 1966. During this period, she had her own show on Japanese television, instructing schoolchildren in xylophone playing, as well as a radio show called "Good Morning Marimba". She also began her recording career, putting out 13 albums in a five-year span.

In 1963, the Yamaha Corporation sought Japanese marimba players to assist in the design of their new instruments; Keiko Abe was chosen for her original and clear ideas of the marimba sound and design, particularly her concept of how the marimba should be able to blend in ensembles, for example, moving away from the inconsistencies and lack of focus of folk percussion instruments. Her ideas for the desired sound of the instruments guided Yamaha's design, and in the 1970s, began production. In addition, at her urging, the range of the new marimba was stretched from four octaves to five, which has become the standard for soloists. Abe has been closely associated with Yamaha ever since, and their first ever signature series of keyboard percussion mallets bears her name.

In addition to performing, she is a composer. Her music is published primarily by Xebec Music Publishing, Tokyo and Schott, Japan. Her compositions, including "Michi", "Variations on Japanese Children's Songs", and "Dream of the Cherry Blossoms", have become standards of the marimba repertoire. Abe is active in promoting the development of literature for the marimba, not only by writing pieces herself, but also by commissioning works by other composers and encouraging young composers. One of the most performed percussion quartets featuring marimba, "Marimba Spiritual," by Minoru Miki, is among the many works commissioned and supported by Abe, and is dedicated to her. She has added at least 70 compositions to the repertoire. She uses improvisation as an important element in developing her musical ideas which she then uses in her compositions.

In addition to her intensive composing, touring, and recording schedule, Abe has been a lecturer, then professor, at the Toho Gakuen School of Music in Tokyo since 1970. She was the first woman to be inducted into the Percussive Arts Society Hall of Fame in 1993.

Abe uses the YM-6100 Marimba. This modern concert marimba design, with five octaves of range, was developed with Abe in partnership with the Yamaha Corporation over a fifteen-year period (from 1969 to 1984).

In May 2021, Abe was one of 10 new members elected to the Royal Swedish Academy of Music, alongside Marika Field, Katarina Karnéus, Jonas Knutsson, Sten Sandell, Đuro Živković, Richard Sparks, Giancarlo Andretta, Stefan Dohr, and Quincy Jones.
