= Katarina Karnéus =

Swedish opera singer (born 1965)

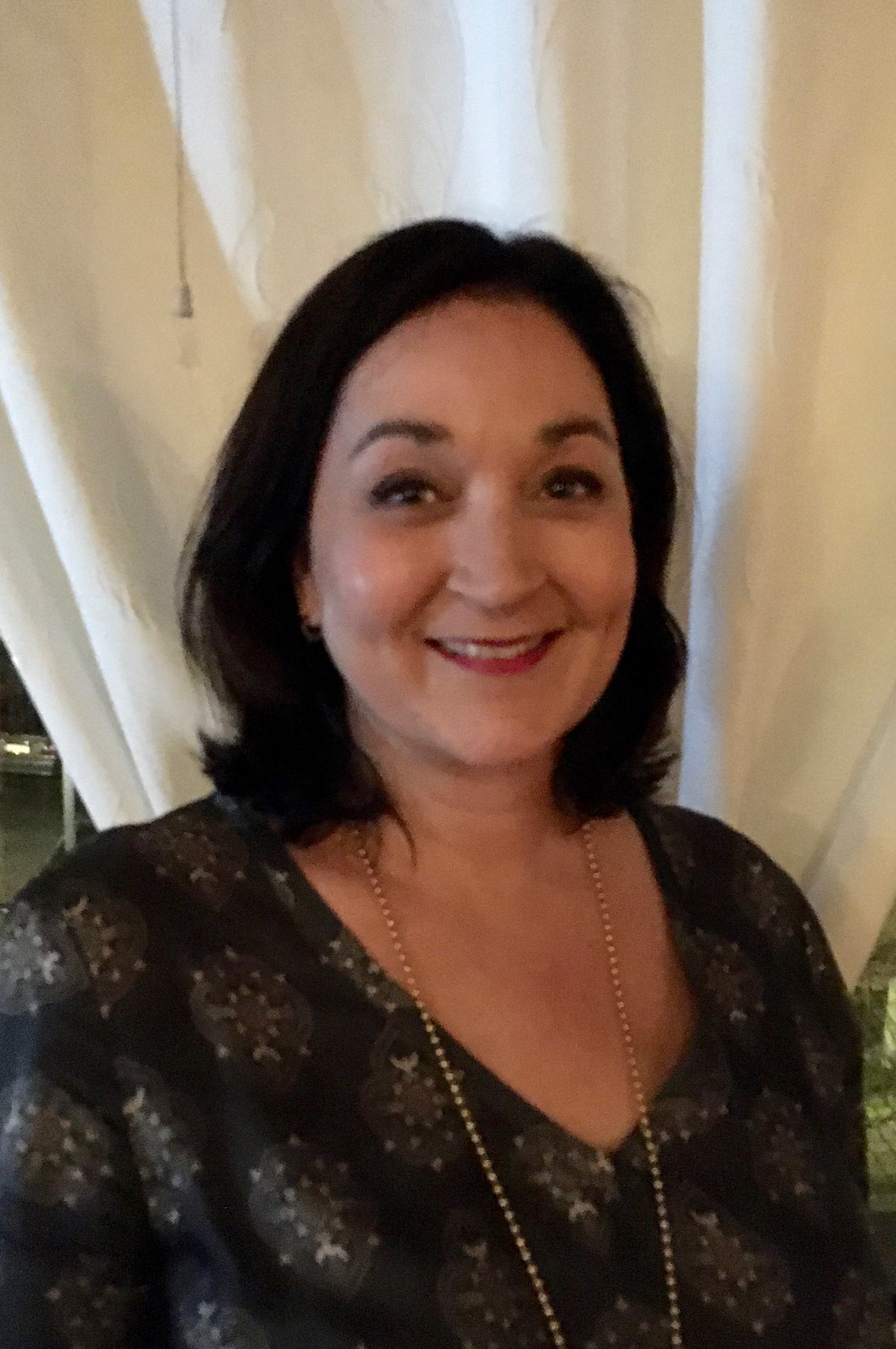
Karnéus in 2020

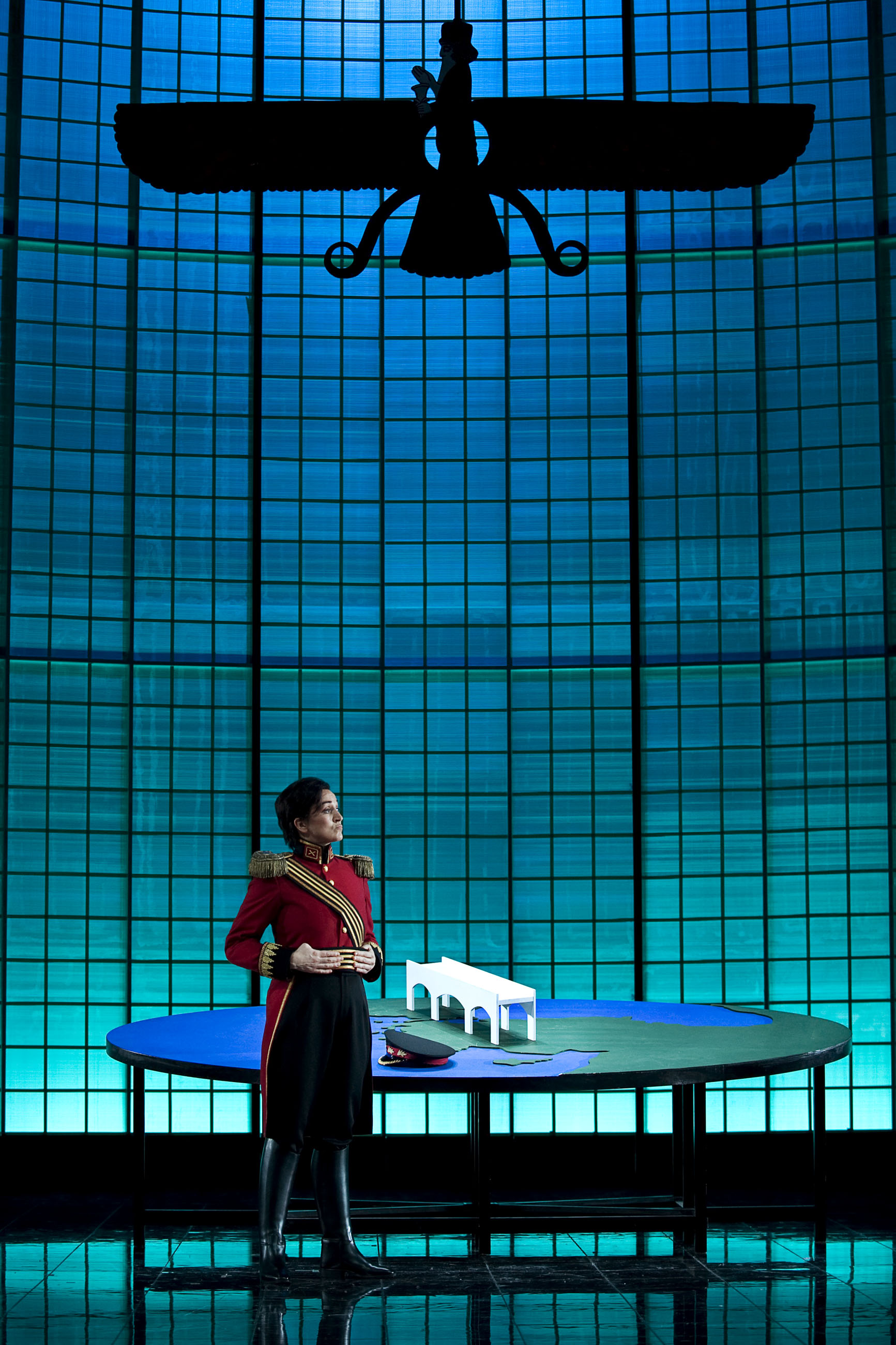
Katarina Karnéus as Xerxes in 2009

Katarina Esmé Marie Karnéus (born 26 November 1965) is a Swedish mezzo-soprano opera singer, winner of the BBC Cardiff Singer of the World competition, active on many of the opera world's major stages such as the Metropolitan Opera and the Paris Opera, and named Hovsångerska by the King of Sweden in 2018.

== Life and career ==
Karnéus was born in Stockholm; her mother is English, who after having spent 30 years in Sweden returned to England in 1987.

She studied at Trinity College of Music in London, where her appearances included Miss Donnithorne’s Maggot (Maxwell Davies) and Thérèse (Tavener), and after at the National Opera Studio also in London, sponsored by the Welsh National Opera. At her audition for London Opera Studio course, the general manager of Welsh National Opera arranged for her to join a tour of Cenerentola around small theatres in Wales. However, when a principal on the main company tour was taken ill she sang Rossini’s title role for them in the full staging at a few days notice.

She won the Cardiff Singer of the World competition in 1995, which immediately launched an international career. The years following saw her appear as the page in Salome in Chicago, Varvara in Káťa Kabanová in New York, Dorabella at Glyndebourne, Rosina at the Opéra-Comique in Paris and Mercédès in Carmen at the Opéra Bastille.

She made her debut at the Metropolitan Opera on 2 January 1999, singing Varvara in Káťa Kabanová and went on to sing there as Olga in Eugene Onegin, Siebel in Faust, Cherubino in Le nozze di Figaro, and Rosina in Il barbiere di Siviglia. In 1999 she also made her debut at the Bayerische Staatsoper singing Annio in La clemenza di Tito. She returned to Bayerische Staatsoper in 2000 for Sesto in the same opera and again in 2001 for Sesto and Dorabella in Così fan tutte. She worked with her teacher Noelle Barker in 1999 in preparation for her first Octavian in Der Rosenkavalier, at Cardiff in June 2000.

Karnéus' breakthrough in her native Sweden was in 2002 singing Octavian at The Göteborg Opera in Gothenburg. Her debut at the Royal Swedish Opera had to wait until 2009, when she sang the title role in Handel's opera Xerxes. Her other appearances on the opera stage have included La Monnaie in Brussels and the Netherlands Opera (Cherubino); Glyndebourne Festival (Dorabella); the Opéra National de Paris (Dorabella and Meg Page in Falstaff); the Opéra-Comique (Rosina and the title role in Carmen); Welsh National Opera (Octavian, Sesto, Angelina in La Cenerentola, Rosina, Cherubino, and the title role of Gluck's Orfeo ed Euridice); and the Théâtre du Châtelet in Paris (the title role in La Belle Hélène and Sesto in Giulio Cesare).

Karnéus is also internationally active as a concert and recital singer. Engagements have included the Proms in London, the Salzburg and Edinburgh Festivals, a concert at the Buckingham Palace with Franz Welser-Möst, concerts with Seiji Ozawa in Tanglewood, Berlioz's La mort de Cléopâtre in the Amsterdam Concertgebouw, Schoenberg's Gurrelieder in Düsseldorf and Elgar's The Dream of Gerontius in Madrid and Barcelona. She has appeared regularly in recital at London's Wigmore Hall since 1995, made her New York recital debut at the Lincoln Center in 2001, and has given solo recitals in Brussels and Washington, D.C. In 2010, she was a soloist at the Nobel Prize award ceremony where she performed "Amour vient rendre à mon âme" from Gluck's Orfeo ed Euridice (Berlioz version) and "Non più mesta" from Rossini's La Cenerentola.

Karnéus was engaged by The Göteborg Opera for a five-year period starting with the 2012-2013 season. In the summers of 2013 and 2014 Karnéus performed at Stålboga Summer Opera. She lives in Lidingö near Stockholm, Sweden.

In September 2015, she sang in the premiere of Notorious at the Göteborg Opera, and in 2020 took the role of Hebé in only the second production of La ville morte by Boulanger in a concert staging also in Göteborg.

In May 2021, Karnéus was one of 10 new members elected to the Royal Swedish Academy of Music, alongside Marika Field, Richard Sparks, Jonas Knutsson, Sten Sandell, Đuro Živković, Keiko Abe, Giancarlo Andretta, Stefan Dohr, and Quincy Jones.

== Awards and stipends ==
- 1992/93: received the Opera Magazine (Swedish: Tidskriften Opera) award
- 1994: received the Christine Nilsson Stipend from the Royal Swedish Academy of Music
- 1995: won the biennial BBC Cardiff Singer of the World competition
- 2010: won the Grammy Award for Best Classical Album and the Grammy Award for Best Choral Performance with Mahler: Symphony No. 8 (mezzo soloist); (San Francisco Symphony 60021) with Adagio From Symphony No. 10.

== Discography ==
- Lieder. R. Strauss, Mahler, Marx. EMI Classics 7243 5 73168 2 8 [5731682].
- Songs of Sibelius. Hyperion CDA 67318.
- Grieg songs. Hyperion CDA67670.
- Szymanowski, Karol: Songs of a fairy-tale princess. EMI Classics 0946 3 64435 2 2.
- Debussy: Syrinx; Bilitis; La plus que lente. Ravel, Chansons madécasses (Katarina Karnéus). Prokofiev, Flute sonata. EMI 7243 5 56982 2 3 [5569822].
- Schreker, Franz: Orchestral works. Vol. 2. Fünf Gesänge: Ur Tusen och en natt, text E. Ronsperger. Chandos CHAN 9951. Svensk mediedatabas.
- Mahler: Orchestral songs. BIS BISSACD 1600.
- Berlioz: Les Nuits d'Été & overtures Le corsaire, Le carnaval romain overture, La roi Lear overture. BBC Philharmonic. Dir. Vassily Sinaisky. BBC Records.
- Beethoven: Symphony No. 9. Neal Davies, Helena Juntunen, Katarina Karneus, Minnesota Chorale and Minnesota Orchestra. Dir. Osmo Vänskä. BIS SACD1616.
- Mercadante: I Normanni a Parigi (Highlights). Philharmonia Orchestra. Dir. Stuart Stradford. Opera Rara. ORR249.
- Donizetti: Rita (Deux hommes et une femme). The Hallé. Dir. Sir Mark Elder. Opera Rara ORC50.
