= Patrick Dupré Quigley =

American conductor, producer and arranger

Patrick Dupré Quigley is an American conductor, producer, and arranger. Quigley is Founder and Artistic Director of Seraphic Fire and Artistic Director Designate of Opera Lafayette.

Quigley has focused on the music of the Classical and Baroque eras, leading the San Francisco Symphony, The Cleveland Orchestra, the Utah Symphony, Opera Lafayette, Music of the Baroque, Chicago, the Kansas City Symphony, Canada's National Arts Centre Orchestra, San Francisco's Philharmonia Baroque Orchestra, the Charlotte Symphony Orchestra, the Grand Rapids Symphony, and the New World Symphony in repertoire ranging from Johann Sebastian Bach and Wolfgang Amadeus Mozart to Igor Stravinsky and Steve Reich. He has recorded with the international pop icon Shakira.

In 2010, Quigley first made national news for his viral internet campaign for his recording of Monteverdi's Vespers of 1610, which "rose to No. 1 on the iTunes classical chart the weekend of August 20th and briefly bettered a Lady Gaga album on the iTunes all-genre chart." Two of Quigley's recordings were nominated for the 54th Annual Grammy Awards: Brahms: Ein Deutsches Requiem was nominated in the "Best Choral Performance" category, and A Seraphic Fire Christmas was nominated in the "Best Chamber Music / Small Ensemble Performance" category. Quigley's most recent recording with Seraphic Fire was the world premiere recording of the complete version of Hildegard of Bingen's Ordo Virtutum.
