= Choral Arts =

American choir

- Origin: Seattle, WA, United States
- Genres: Choral, A cappella, Classical, Contemporary
- Years active: 1993–present
- Members: Artistic Director; Robert Bode
- Past members: Founder; Richard Sparks
- Website: www.choral-arts.org

Choral Arts is an American choir, based in Seattle, Washington, performing under the direction of conductor and artistic director Robert Bode. Choral Arts comprises volunteer singers drawn exclusively from the Seattle region who combine a deep sense of community with a degree of artistic excellence that has garnered national recognition and critical acclaim.

== Composer in Residence ==
Each year, Choral Arts chooses a Composer-in-residence to help direct the artistic choices of the choir throughout the season. The composer also composes a new piece for the choir in the spring, putting to words the poetry of the choir's "Finding Your Voice" competition, which invites students between 6th-12th grade to submit poetry to be set to choral music. Following is a list of recent Composers in residence:

- 2009 - 2010 - Vijay Singh
- 2010 - 2011 - Giselle Wyers
- 2011 - 2012 - Karen P. Thomas
- 2012 - 2013 - Eric Barnum
- 2013 - 2014 - John David Earnest
- 2014 - 2015 - Melinda Bargreen
- 2015 - 2016 - Jake Runestad

== Awards ==
- 2010 - Margaret Hillis Achievement Award for Choral Excellence
- 2010 - Awarded performance slot at the ACDA Regional Conference
- 2010 - The American Prize for choral performance (1st Place)
- 2013 - Awarded performance slot at the Chorus America National Conference
- 2013 - The American Prize for choral performance (2nd Place)
- 2015 - Awarded performance slot at the ACDA National Conference in Salt Lake City, Utah

== Premieres ==
- Vergine bella, John David Earnest, 2013
- Behold the Handmaid, Rick Asher, 2013
- Psallite, Rick Asher, 2013
- Returning, John David Earnest, 2014
- Night, Melinda Bargreen, 2015
- Making Peace, John Muehleisen, 2015

== Discography ==
=== CDs ===
- The Light of Stars (1993)
- A Scandinavian Christmas (1997)
- Cathedral Anthems (2002)
- Mornings Like This (2009)
- Frank Ferko Stabat Mater (2010)
- Shall We Gather at the River (2012)
- Life Stories: The Choral Music of Eric Barnum (2014)
