= David Bernard (conductor) =

American orchestral conductor

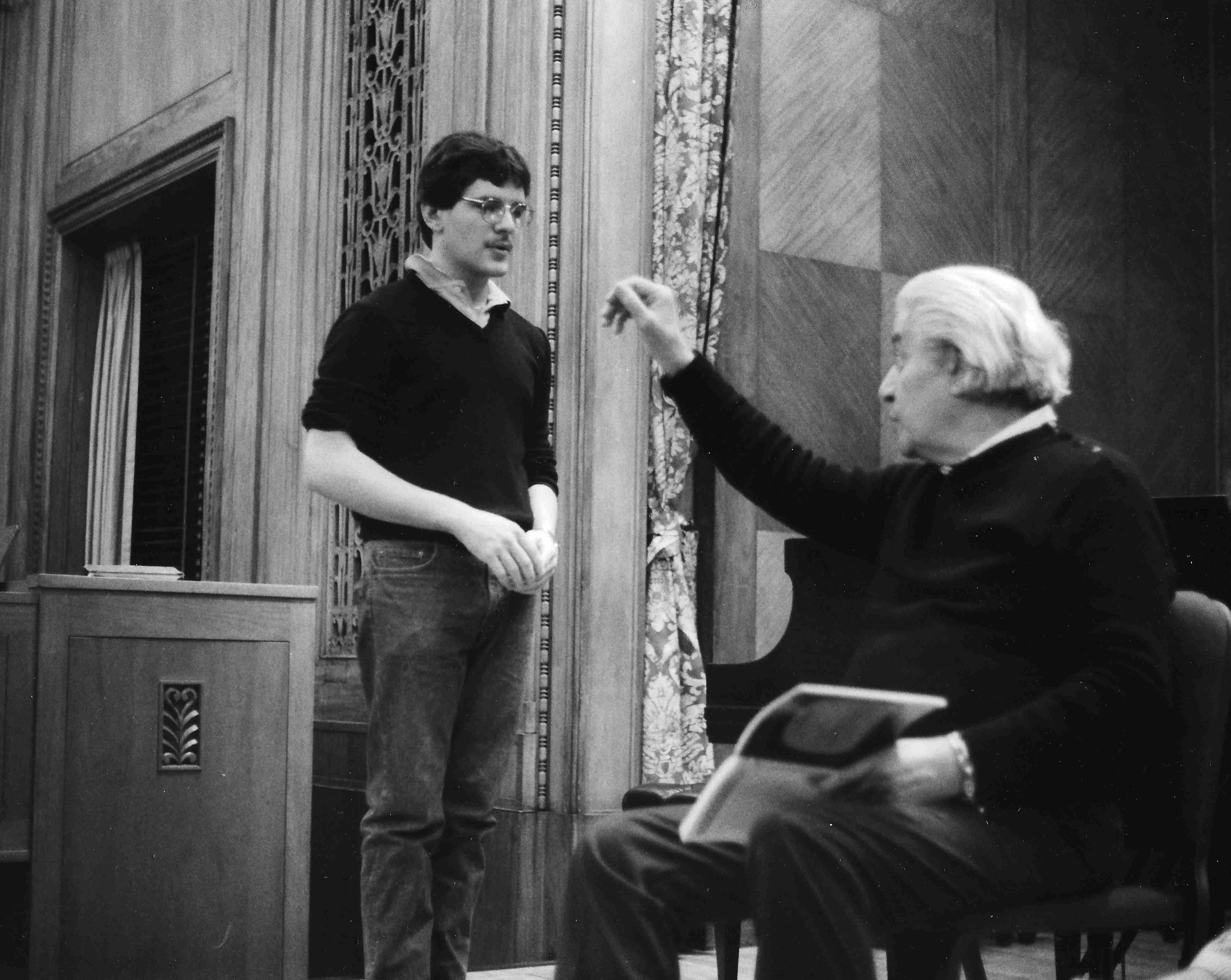
Sergiu Celibidache giving a conducting lesson to David Bernard at Curtis Institute of Music in 1984.

David Bernard (born 1964) is an American orchestral conductor and music director of the Park Avenue Chamber Symphony in New York City, which he founded in 1999. He is also music director of Massapequa Philaharmonic and the Eglevsky Ballet, and has conducted in the United States and in over 20 countries. In 2016, he introduced "Classical Music from the Inside Out", a new format that puts the audience are seated on stage with the orchestra during concerts.

In 2019, he won first prize in the professional division of The American Prize Orchestral Conducting Competition.

== Early life and education ==
Bernard is a graduate of the Curtis Institute of Music and Juilliard School.

== Career ==
Before founding the Park Avenue Chamber Symphony, Bernard was an assistant conductor with the Long Island Youth Orchestra. and Assistant Conductor of the Jacksonville Symphony. In 1999, he started the Park Avenue Chamber Symphony

Bernard has appeared as a guest conductor with orchestras which have included the Brooklyn Symphony, the Greater Newburgh Symphony Orchestra, the Litha Symphony, Manhattan School of Music, the Massapequa Philharmonic, the New York Symphonic Arts Ensemble, the Putnam Symphony and the South Shore Symphony. He has presented world premières of scores by Bruce Adolphe, Chris Caswell, John Mackey, Ted Rosenthal, Jake Runestad Distinguished concert collaborators have included Anna Lee, Jeffrey Biegel, Carter Brey, David Chan, Catherine Cho, Adrian Daurov, Pedro Díaz, Edith Dowd, Stanley Drucker, Bart Feller, Ryu Goto, Whoopi Goldberg, Sirena Huang, Judith Ingolfsson, Yevgeny Kutik, Anna Lee, Jessica Lee, Kristin Lee, Jon Manasse, Anthony McGill, Spencer Myer, Todd Phillips, Kristin Sampson and Cameron Schutza.

He has worked with Clinton F. Nieweg, a retired librarian of the Philadelphia Orchestra, on editing new editions of Stravinsky's "The Rite of Spring" and "The Firebird Suite—1919 Version", which was published by Edwin F. Kalmus in 2016. He has published his own editions of Mozart's Clarinet Concerto, K. 622, and Schumann's Symphony No. 2, Op. 61.

=== "Inside Out" format and outreach ===
In an effort to bring classical music to new audiences, Bernard has sought to engage families through schools and present multimedia performances. He has also developed a novel format, called "Classical Music from the Inside Out", in which audiences are seated inside the orchestra during concerts. His 'Inside Out' concerts with the Park Avenue Chamber Symphony and the Massapequa Philharmonic have been acclaimed by WQXR, Newsday, Classical World and the Epoch Times.

== Reception ==
The 'American Prize' judges praised him as "a first-rate conductor...phenomenal performance...masterly in shaping, phrasing, technique and expressively." Lucid Culture said of a Lincoln Center performance of Stravinsky's "The Rite of Spring". "Conducting from memory, David Bernard led a transcendent performance. Segues were seamless, contrasts were vivid and Stravinsky's whirling exchanges of voices were expertly choreographed." Bernard's complete recorded Beethoven symphony cycle was praised by Fanfare magazine for its "intensity, spontaneity, propulsive rhythm, textural clarity, dynamic control, and well-judged phrasing". His premiere recording of a new edition of Stravinsky's '"The Rite of Spring" was praised by Gramophone as "committed and forceful...(with) thrilling moments".
