= Brian Turner (American poet) =

American poet

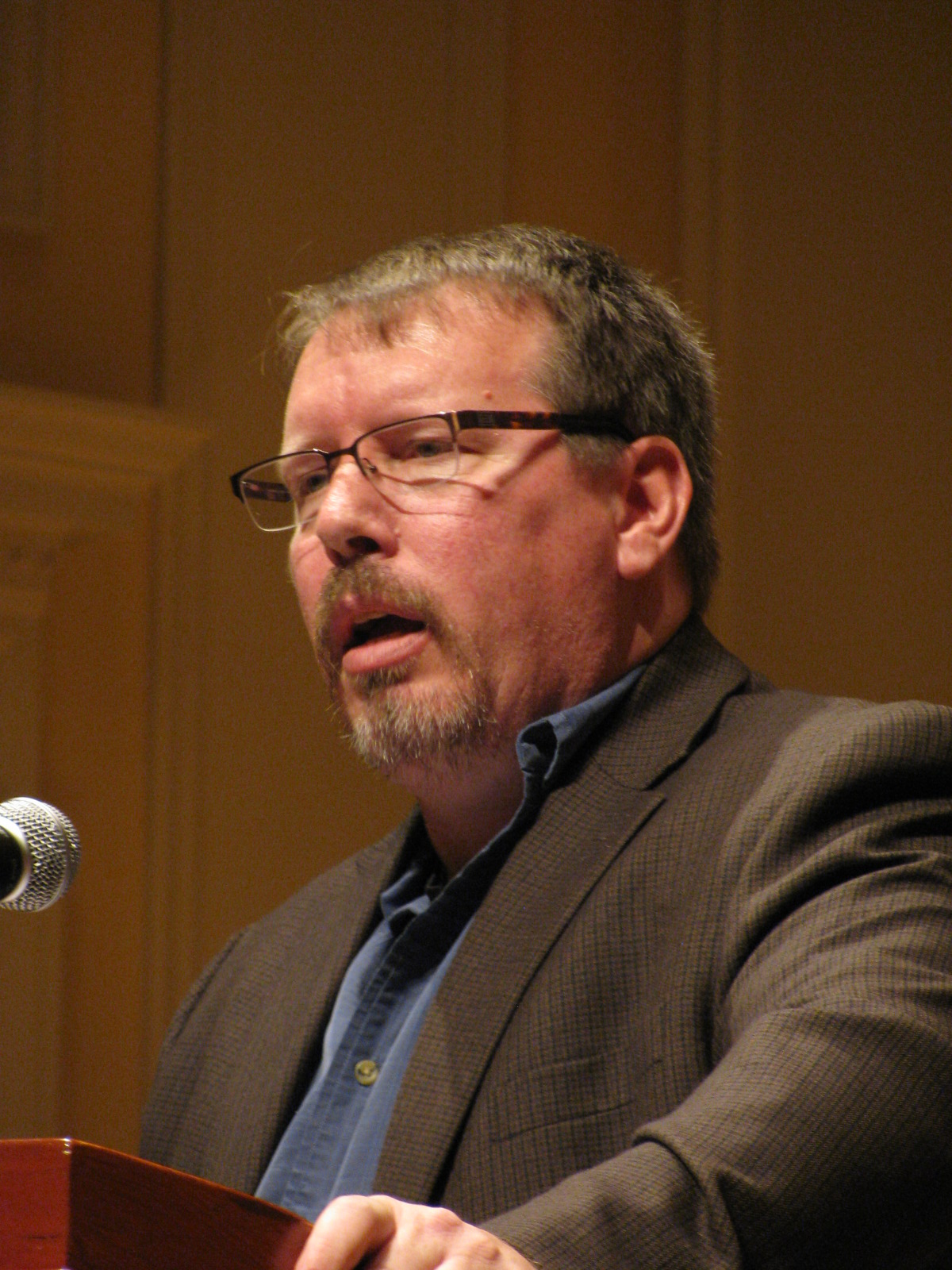
- Born: 1967 (age 58–59); Visalia, California
- Education: Fresno State; University of Oregon
- Spouse: Ilyse Kusnetz (m.2010; died 2016)
- Writing career
- Genre: Poetry
- Notable awards: Beatrice Hawley Award

Brian Turner (born 1967) is an American poet, essayist, and professor. He won the 2005 Beatrice Hawley Award for his debut collection, Here, Bullet (Alice James Books) the first of many awards and honors received for this collection of poems about his experience as a soldier in the Iraq War. His honors since include a Lannan Literary Fellowship and NEA Literature Fellowship in Poetry, and the Amy Lowell Poetry Travelling Scholarship. His second collection, shortlisted for the 2010 T. S. Eliot Prize is Phantom Noise (Alice James Books, USA; Bloodaxe Books, UK, 2010).

== Early life and education ==
Turner was born in Visalia, California, and raised in Fresno and then Madera County through high school and attended Fresno City College before transferring to Fresno State for his BA and MA. He received his MFA from the University of Oregon. He taught English in South Korea for a year, and traveled to Russia, the United Arab Emirates, and Japan.

== Military service ==
Turner is a United States Army veteran, and was an infantry team leader for a year in the Iraq War beginning November 2003, with the 3rd Stryker Brigade Combat Team, 2nd Infantry Division. In 1999 and 2000 he was with the 10th Mountain Division, deployed in Bosnia and Herzegovina.

== Career ==
Turner has seen his poems published in The Cortland Review, Poetry Daily, Atlanta Review, Crab Orchard Review, Georgia Review, Rattle, Virginia Quarterly Review, and ZYZZYVA, and in anthologies including Voices in Wartime: The Anthology (Whit Press, 2005) and Operation Homecoming: Iraq, Afghanistan, and the Home Front, in the Words of U.S. Troops and Their Families (Random House, 2006). His published essays include one for National Geographic and a series of essays for The New York Times blog, Home Fires.

Turner received major media attention for Here, Bullet, interviewed or featured in The New Yorker, The New York Times, on The NewsHour with Jim Lehrer, on Morning Edition and other NPR programs, The Verb (BBC), and many other venues. He was featured in the film, Operation Homecoming: Writing the Wartime Experience, nominated for a 2007 Academy Award for Best Documentary. Bloodaxe Books published the U.K. edition of Here, Bullet in 2007 His works have been included in such anthologies as The Best American Poetry 2007 and A mind apart: poems of melancholy, madness, and addiction.

Texts by Turner are the basis of the large-scale musical composition Dreams of the Fallen by Jake Runestad, first performed at The National WWII Museum in New Orleans on Veterans Day, 11 November 2013.

== Books ==
- Here, Bullet, Alice James Books, 2005, ISBN 978-1-882295-55-5; Bloodaxe Books, UK, 2007, ISBN 978-1-85224-799-7.
- Phantom Noise, Alice James Books, 2010, ISBN 978-1-882295-80-7; Bloodaxe Books, UK, 2010, ISBN 978-1-85224-876-5.
- My Life as a Foreign Country: A Memoir, 2014; W. W. Norton & Company ISBN 978-0393245011
- The Kiss: Intimacies from Writers, 2018, (editor); W. W. Norton & Company ISBN 978-0393635263
- The Goodbye World Poem, 2023; Alice James Books ISBN 9781949944549

== Honors and awards ==
- 2016: 2016 Guggenheim Fellowship in Poetry
- 2012: JUSFC Japan-US Friendship Commission Fellowship
- 2009: 2009 Fellow Award from United States Artists
- 2009: Amy Lowell Poetry Travelling Scholarship
- 2008: 2008 Charity Randall Citation
- 2007: NEA Literature Fellowship in Poetry
- 2007: Poets' Prize for Here Bullet
- 2006: Maine Literary Award in Poetry
- 2006: Northern California Book Award in Poetry
- 2006: PEN Center USA "Best in the West" Literary Award in Poetry
- 2006: Sheila Margaret Motten Award from the New England Poetry Club
- 2006: Lannan Literary Fellowship
- 2005: Beatrice Hawley Award

== Personal life ==
Turner married fellow poet Ilyse Kusnetz (1966-2016) in 2010. He created an album titled 11 11 (Me Smiling) using lines from her poetry, in some instances in her own voice, from tapes of her readings, and others, him reading from her poems.
