= Seraphic Fire =

American professional vocal ensemble

- Choir
- Origin: South Miami, Florida, United States
- Founded: 2002
- Founder: Patrick Dupré Quigley and Joanne N. Schulte
- Genre: Classical music, Choral music, Baroque music, Contemporary classical music
- President: Diane Ashley – Board Chair
- Artistic Director: James K. Bass
- Leadership: Danny M. Yanez, CFRE – Executive Director
- Headquarters: Miami, Florida, United States
- Rehearsal space: Comber Hall, Coral Gables, Florida
- Awards: Grammy Award nominations (2012); Miami-Dade's Favorite Nonprofit (2025)
- Website: seraphicfire.org

Seraphic Fire is a Grammy-nominated professional classical vocal ensemble based in Miami, Florida. Founded in 2002 by Patrick Dupré Quigley and Joanne N. Schulte at the Church of the Epiphany in South Miami, Florida, the ensemble is currently led by Artistic Director James K. Bass and Executive Director Dr. Danny M. Yanez, CFRE. In June 2026, Bass succeeded founder Patrick Dupré Quigley as Artistic Director, while Quigley assumed the title of Artistic Director Laureate. Bass is a Grammy Award-winning conductor, educator, and arts leader. In fiscal year 2025, Seraphic Fire reported the most successful fundraising year in its 22-year history. In 2025, the organization was recognized as Miami-Dade's Favorite Nonprofit in the Miami Herald Readers' Choice Awards. Seraphic Fire is a nonprofit 501(c)(3) organization that presents high-quality performances of historically significant and underperformed music, advances the art through the professional development of its musicians, and promotes community connectivity through youth musical education.

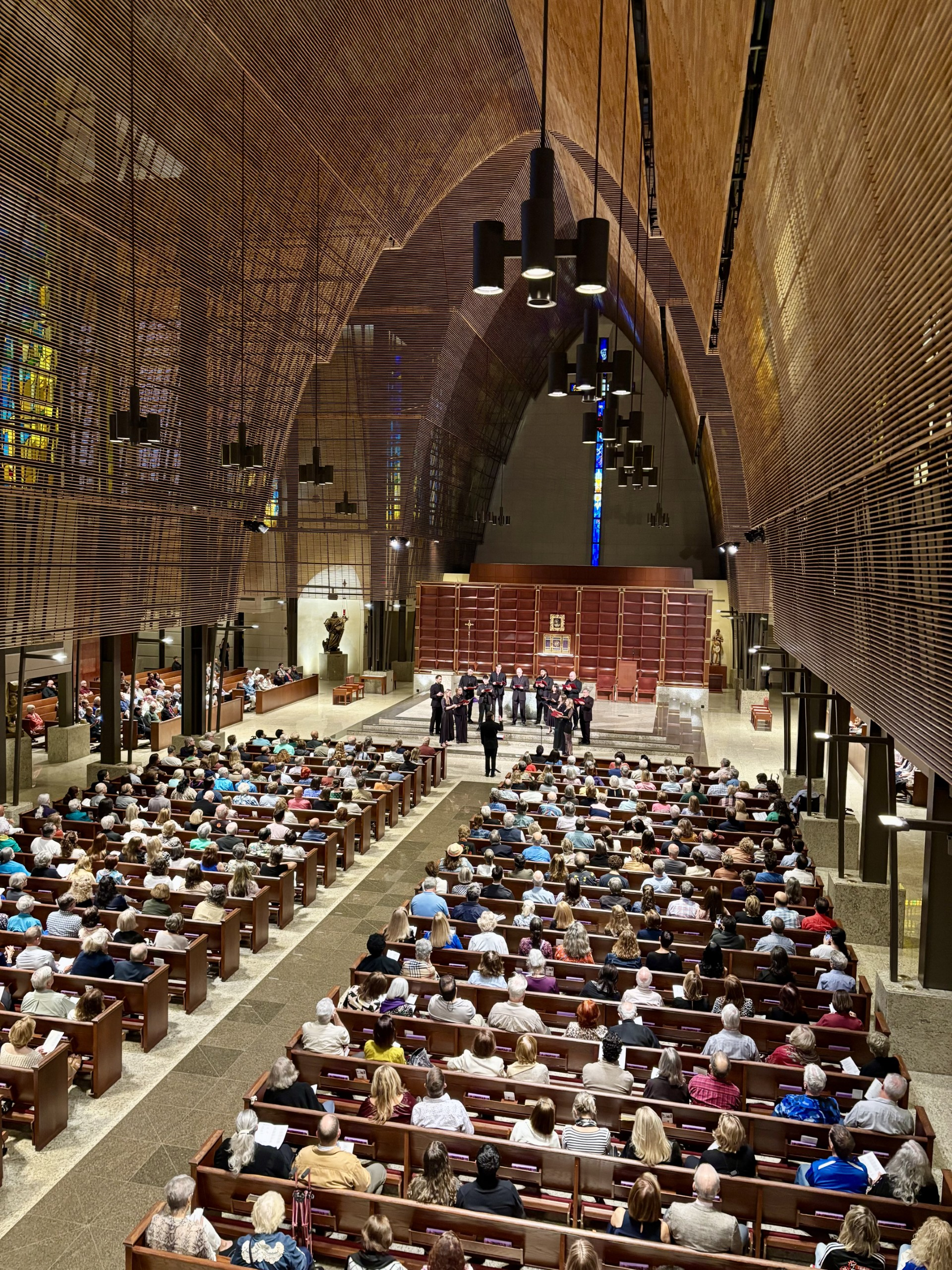
Seraphic Fire performing Music of the Passion at the Church of the Epiphany in South Miami, Florida, March 28, 2025.

While headquartered in Miami, Seraphic Fire maintains a regular schedule of concerts throughout South Florida, with performances in Coral Gables, Miami, Fort Lauderdale, Naples, and Boca Raton, and also tours nationally. Seraphic Fire's repertoire includes Gregorian chants, Baroque masterpieces, works by Mahler, and newly commissioned works by American composers.

Two of the ensemble's recordings, Brahms: Ein Deutsches Requiem and A Seraphic Fire Christmas were nominated for the 2012 Grammy awards, making Seraphic Fire the only choral ensemble in North or South America to be nominated that year, and the only classical ensemble in the world to be nominated for two separate projects.

The ensemble's September 2014 release, Reincarnations: A Century of American Choral Music, placed No. 6 on the Billboard Traditional Classical Chart and the ensemble's Grammy-nominated recording of Brahms: Ein Deutsches Requiem debuted at No. 7 on the Billboard Traditional Classical Chart.

Seraphic Fire has a partnership with Naxos of America for the distribution of its media. The group maintains a regular schedule of concerts throughout South Florida and also tours nationally.

Seraphic Fire takes its name from a line in William Billings’ 18th-century hymn, Invocation, which calls upon the divine to “fill us with Seraphic Fire”—a phrase that captures the ensemble’s passion for transcendent musical expression.

== Educational activities ==
In 2018, Seraphic Fire launched the Professional Choral Institute in partnership with the Aspen Music Festival and School to prepare singers specifically for professional ensemble singing. The organization also partners with the University of Miami Frost School of Music and the Herb Alpert School of Music at UCLA for artist development programs, including season-long mentorship for undergraduate and graduate vocalists. Through the Ensemble Artist Program, undergraduate and graduate vocalists from the University of Miami and UCLA perform alongside Seraphic Fire artists and receive season-long professional mentorship.

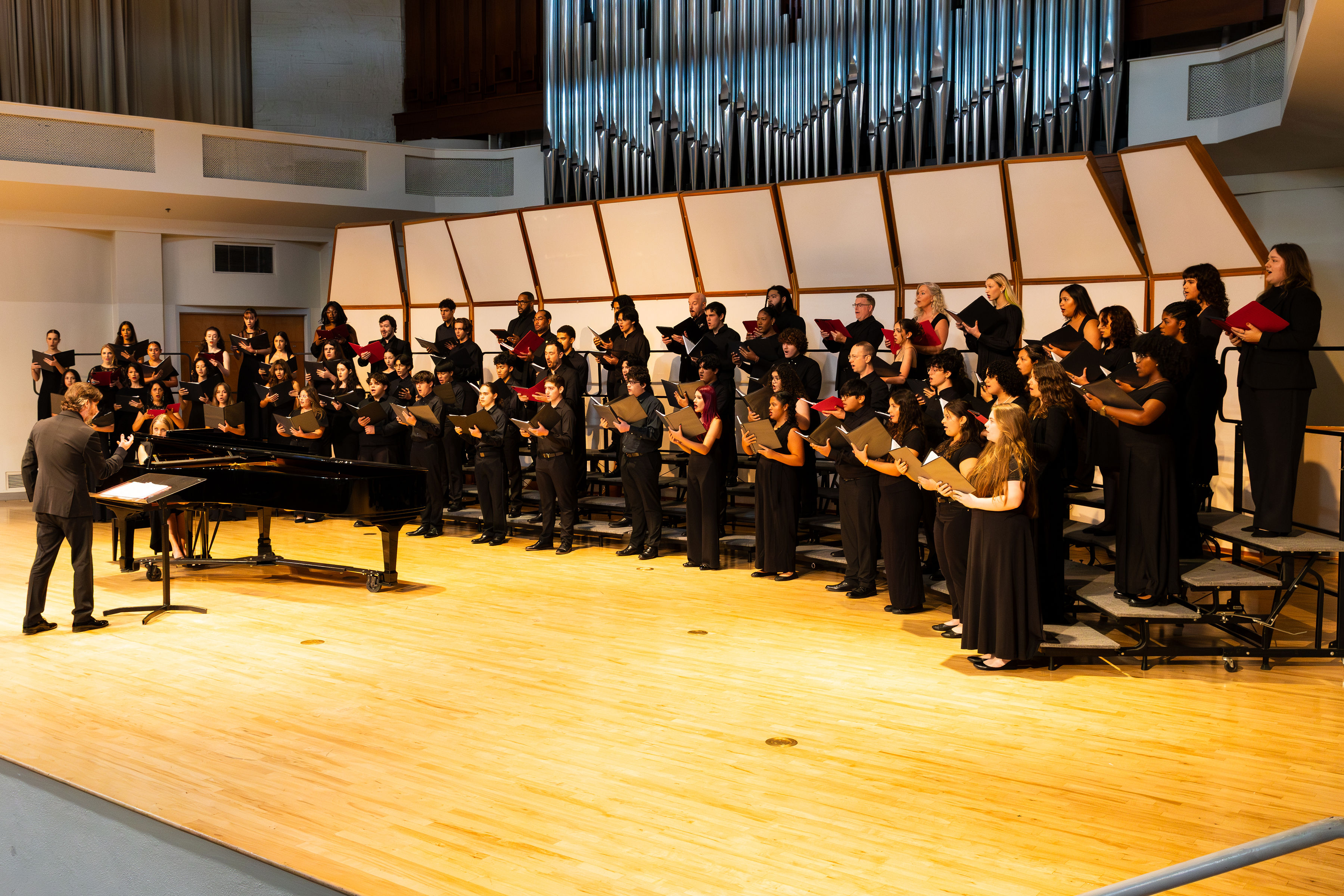
High School Professional Choral Institute students performing with Seraphic Fire at the Wertheim Performing Arts Center at FIU, June 14, 2025.

In June 2025, Seraphic Fire hosted the High School Professional Choral Institute (HSPCI), a five-day intensive in partnership with Florida International University’s Wertheim School of Music & Performing Arts. The program welcomed 56 rising juniors and seniors from 11 Miami-Dade County public schools. Students rehearsed and performed alongside Seraphic Fire’s professional artists, receiving mentorship, ensemble training, and career guidance. The HSPCI culminated in a concert featuring student singers and Seraphic Fire musicians performing together.

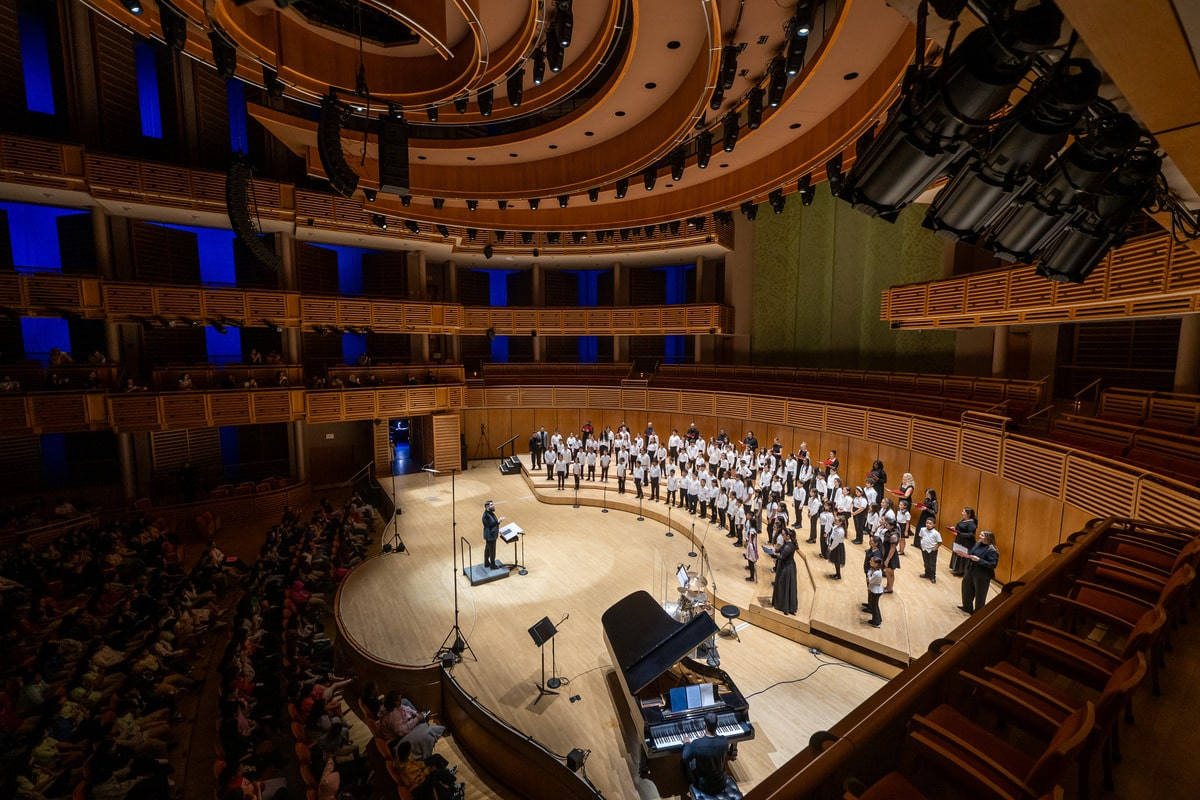
Students from Comstock Elementary and Kendale Lakes Elementary perform on stage with Seraphic Fire at the Knight Concert Hall in Miami, April 14, 2025.

Seraphic Fire’s education and outreach programs reach students across South Florida. Through the Seraphic Fire Youth Initiative (SFYI), the ensemble served 4,203 students from public schools in Miami-Dade, Broward, and Collier Counties with in-school workshops, education concerts, and choral residencies. The Choral Education Residency program provided weekly instruction to elementary students from partner schools, while the organization’s education concerts were presented in venues including the Adrienne Arsht Center and The Parker at The Broward Center.

Additional programming includes a High School Masterclass for advanced choral students and a Student Conductor in Residence program with doctoral candidates from the University of Miami. The Student Conductor in Residence program provides doctoral conducting students with professional experience through score preparation, rehearsal leadership, and mentorship from Seraphic Fire's artistic staff. Seraphic Fire also operates StudentAccess, a ticketing initiative that provides complimentary admission to college students to expand access to live classical music.

== Discography ==
- 2005 - Beginnings
- 2007 - Amazing Grace: A Gospel and Bluegrass Journey
- 2008 - Shalom Pax
- 2008 - Messiah Live
- 2009 - IKON
- 2010 - The Brandenburg Project
- 2010 - Monteverdi: Vespers of the Blessed Virgin 1610
- 2011 - A Seraphic Fire Christmas
- 2011 - Brahms: Ein Deutsches Requiem, op. 45
- 2012 - Silent Night
- 2013 - Seraphic Fire
- 2013 - Ave Maria: Gregorian Chant
- 2014 - Reincarnations: A Century of American Choral Music
- 2014 - Candlelight Carols: Music for Chorus and Harp
- 2016 - Steal Away: The African American Concert Spiritual
- 2021 - Hildegard von Bingen: Ordo virtutum
- 2023 - The Apple Tree
