= Iain Paterson =

Opera singer, bass-baritone

Iain Paterson (born 1973) is a Scottish bass-baritone singer who has appeared in opera and concert.

He was born in Glasgow. His first study was the violin, but his voice was recognised as his more important calling by his teachers at the Royal Scottish Academy of Music and Drama. He sang in the chorus of Opera North for four years.

He sang as a bass for ten years, later extending his range to bass-baritone.

Paterson has sung with the English National Opera in a number of productions, including Mozart's Don Giovanni. He made his debut at the Salzburg Festival in 2007 as Fasolt in Wagner's Das Rheingold under Sir Simon Rattle. He first appeared at the Metropolitan Opera as Gunther in Wagner's Götterdämmerung in 2009, under James Levine.

He sang in the Australian premiere of Shostakovich's 13th Symphony in 2008. His other concert repertoire includes Beethoven's 9th Symphony, Elgar's The Dream of Gerontius, Mendelssohn's Elijah, Verdi's Requiem and Handel's Messiah.

He has also sung in his native Scotland with various companies, the Paris Opera, the Chicago Opera Theater, at the Bregenz Festival, and at the Royal Opera, Covent Garden.
