= Santa Fe Desert Chorale =

The Santa Fe Desert Chorale is a 24-voice professional choir in Santa Fe, New Mexico which was founded in 1982.

== Overview ==
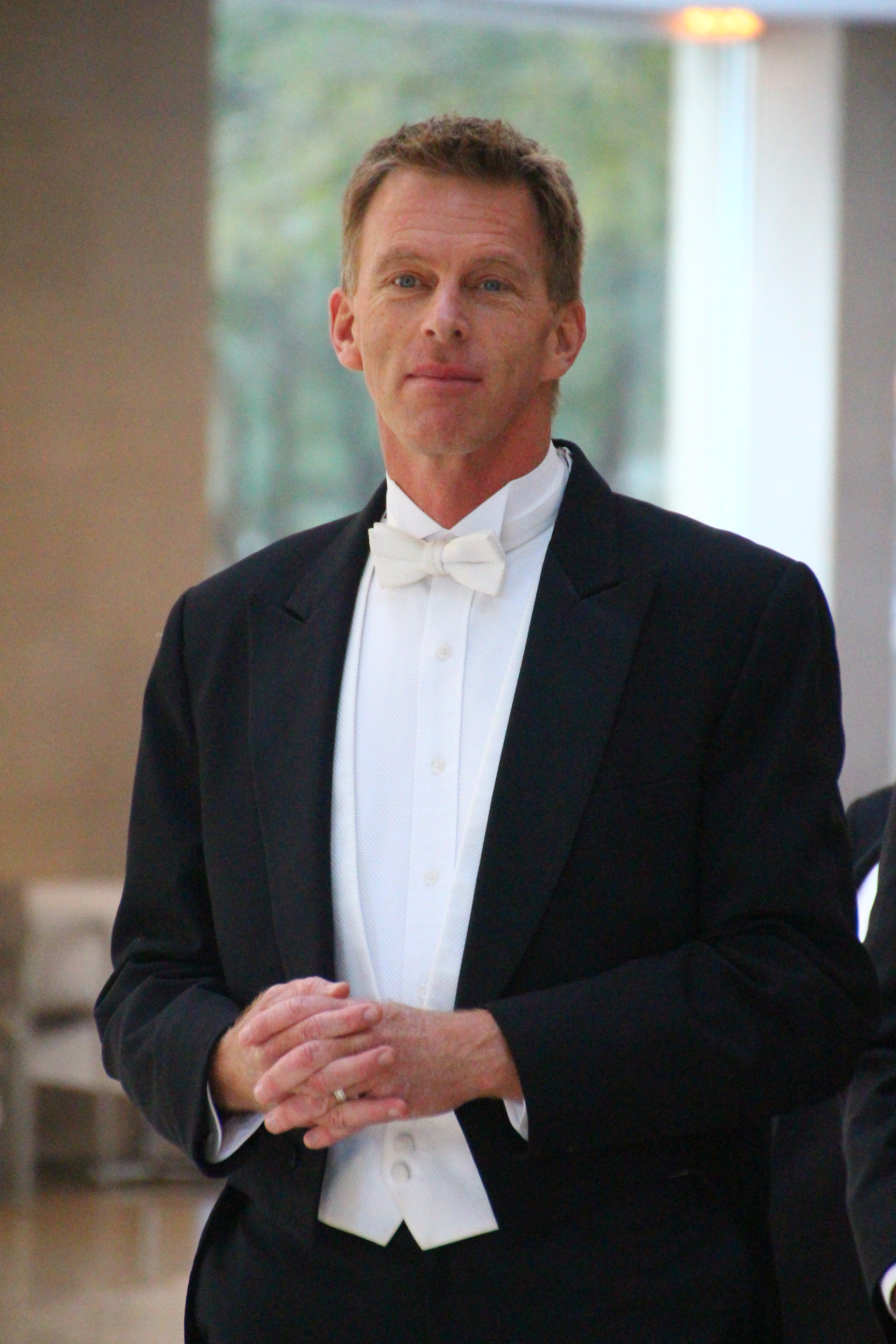
Joshua Habermann, director (2019)

The Santa Fe Desert Chorale is a professional chamber choir based in Santa Fe, New Mexico. Founded in 1982 by Lawrence "Larry" Bandfield, the Chorale is one of the longest-running professional music organizations in New Mexico and is regarded as one of the most distinguished professional chamber choirs in America. Its mission is to excite, engage, and inspire diverse audiences with the beauty and power of great choral music.

Under the artistic leadership of Joshua Habermann since 2008 , the Chorale performs a rich and expansive repertoire spanning seven centuries, from early polyphony to vibrant contemporary works. The ensemble brings together 24 exceptional professional singers carefully selected from across the United States for their artistry and musicianship.

The ensemble performs in the historic Cathedral Basilica of St. Francis of Assisi in Santa Fe and other venues throughout New Mexico. The Dallas Morning News has described the ensemble as "a top-notch, 24-voice group...comprising the crème de la crème of professional choral singers from coast to coast," and the Santa Fe New Mexican has called it "a rara avis in the choral music world." Classical Voice North America shares that "the ensemble has established itself as one of the premier choirs in the nation and is one of the few that excels in a variety of styles, extending from the Renaissance period through the present day."

The Santa Fe Desert Chorale is a 501(c)(3) nonprofit organization.

== Organization ==
The Desert Chorale holds general concerts during Summer, and holiday concerts in December. They have recorded 13 CDs.

The casting of the chorus changes yearly, with about two thirds returning on any given year. Habermann conducts auditions in New York, Los Angeles, and Dallas, while some musicians send recordings.

== See also ==
- Santa Fe Chamber Music Festival
