= Park Avenue Chamber Symphony =

American classical symphony orchestra

- Orchestra
- Short name: PACS
- Location: New York City, U.S.
- Principal conductor: David Bernard
- Music director: David Bernard
- Website: chambersymphony.com

The Park Avenue Chamber Symphony (PACS) is a classical symphony orchestra based in New York City.

The orchestra has performed at Lincoln Center and Carnegie Hall and won The American Prize Competition in Orchestral Performance three times. The orchestra's recordings are produced by Recursive Classics, and are distributed through Apple, Amazon, Spotify and other retailers.

The current music director and conductor is David Bernard. The symphony regularly features soloists such as David Chan (concertmaster, Metropolitan Symphony Orchestra), Carter Brey (cellist, New York Philharmonic), and Anthony McGill (clarinet, New York Philharmonic).

David Bernard and the Park Avenue Chamber Symphony regularly feature events where audiences sit with the musicians—called InsideOut Concerts—an approach developed by Bernard to build classical music audiences.
