= Rockford Symphony Orchestra =

- Orchestra
- Short name: RSO
- Former name: Rockford Symphony
- Founded: 1934
- Location: Rockford, Illinois
- Concert hall: Coronado Theatre
- Music director: Yaniv Attar
- Website: www.rockfordsymphony.com

The Rockford Symphony Orchestra is a symphony orchestra based in Rockford, Illinois, USA. Currently in its 91st season, the orchestra is the third largest orchestra in the state of Illinois. The RSO offices are located in the Riverfront Museum Park. The orchestra performs in the Coronado Theatre.

== History ==
The Rockford Symphony Orchestra was founded in 1934 to celebrate Rockford's centennial anniversary. The orchestra took a hiatus during World War II and resumed in 1943.

The Rockford Symphony Orchestra was incorporated in 1943. During this time, the Rockford Area Youth Symphony Orchestra and the Rockford Symphony Orchestra Guild were established.

== Music directors ==
RSO began performing concerts in 1934 under the direction of Andreas Fugmann, the then head of Rockford College music department. He led the orchestra until 1940.

In March 1943, Arthur Zack led the then civic orchestra until becoming music director and Manager until May 1970. Following Zack's tenure, Dr. Crawford Gates was appointed music director of the orchestra. During his tenure, the orchestra began to bring in more guest artists and professional musicians.

When Gates retired, Charles Bornstein was named the music director of the orchestra (1986). Bornstein's tenure was not without controversy. While his artistic vision for the orchestra was certainly ambitious, many felt that he lacked "people skills" in working with orchestral personnel. There was, during this time, a large attrition rate of long term orchestra members.

In 1970, the board of directors appointed Crawford Gates as the next music director. He brought renowned guest artists to perform with the orchestra including Van Cliburn (1972), Victor Borge (1973), Phyllis Diller (1974), and Benny Goodman (1975). Upon the retirement of Crawford Gates, the RSO Board named Charles Bornstein as music director in 1986. Bornstein's intellectual and artistic vision was characteristic of his tenure.

=== Steve Larsen ===
In 1991, the board named Steven Larsen as the RSO's fourth music director. Described as a “Renaissance musician,” Larsen went to work and expanded the orchestra's repertoire, attracting musicians of the highest caliber. The RSO has hosted such notable classical and pops artists as Peter Schickele, Rick Nielsen, Dionne Warwick, Andre Watts, Eugene Fodor, Itzhak Perlman, Yo Yo Ma, Rachel Barton Pine, Alon Goldstein, Daniel Rodriguez, and Stefan Jackiw. During his tenure, Larsen added a pops series, an outdoor summer performance series and youth concerts to the symphony's concert rosters. Through creative and innovative programming Maestro Larsen has endeavored to bring the RSO's performances to wider audiences by performing in new and non-traditional venues. His accomplishments have been recognized through numerous awards, including the Illinois Council of Orchestras’ 2006 Conductor of the Year and the 1999 Mayor's Arts Award for individual achievement.

Under his direction, and with the board's vision, the RSO has expanded the orchestra's repertoire and attracted musicians of the highest caliber. In addition to an expanded "classics series", the RSO has added/increased the pop series, youth education programs, a summer music series, and fully staged operas.

Steven Larsen marks his 30th season with the Rockford Symphony Orchestra. During this tenure the orchestra has flourished and grown to become the third largest symphony orchestra in Illinois. His energetic leadership earned two “Orchestra of the Year” awards to the Rockford Symphony Orchestra and three “Conductor of the Year” awards for himself, the most recent in 2016. Critics have praised his ease with all ranges of musical styles and periods, his sense of line and dramatic tension, and his ability to bring new life to familiar music. Audiences respond warmly to his informal podium style and enjoy his enthusiastic desire to communicate his love for music.

Larsen is a native of Chicago, where he attended the American Conservatory of Music, receiving a degree in music theory and composition. As his interests in conducting grew, he auditioned for the graduate program at Northwestern University, earning an assistantship and leading to studies with Margaret Hillis and Bernard Rubenstein. He received that school's first M.M. in orchestral conducting in 1976. In 1979 he was the only American to be awarded a fellowship in the prestigious Netherlands Broadcasting Company Conductors Course, leading to continued studies with the late Russian conductor Kyrill Kondrashin. In 1981 he was invited to participate in the first Conductors Institute, held in Morgantown, West Virginia, as a conducting fellow.

A significant portion of his career has been devoted to opera. For 13 years, he was resident conductor and artistic administrator of Chicago Opera Theater, where he also produced the New Opera Workshop. He has guest conducted for opera companies in Chicago, Detroit, Minneapolis, Honolulu, Cleveland, Westchester (NY), and Dayton (OH), returning to Dayton for a season as interim general director. For three years he was principal conductor for Opera Theater of San Antonio.

His many symphonic guest conducting engagements include the State Orchestra of Mexico; the Camerata Polifonica Siciliana in Catania, Italy; the Milwaukee Symphony, Grant Park Symphony and Tulsa Philharmonic, as well as leading several children's concerts with the Chicago Symphony. In 2012 he traveled to Prague to conduct the Hradec Králové Philharmonic.

He has received the “Star of Excellence” Award from the Mendelssohn Performing Arts Center, the “Mayor’s Arts Award for Distinguished Service by an Individual”, and the “Distinguished Service” Award from the Rockford Park District.

Larsen retired in 2021 after 30 seasons and was named music director emeritus.

=== Yaniv Attar ===
Yaniv Attar is the current music director of the Rockford Symphony Orchestra. He was appointed the fifth music director in January 2023, following an international search. A native of Israel, he is the 1st prize winner of the Duna Szimfonikus Conducting Competition Budapest, a multiple recipient of the Sir Georg Solti Foundation US Career Assistance Award, and the recipient of the 2009 Bruno Walter Memorial Foundation Award.

== Musicians ==
The Rockford Symphony Orchestra boasts musicians from Illinois, Wisconsin, Iowa, Indiana and Michigan. All musicians are hired on a year-long contract with many sponsored chairs.

== Performance venue ==
The RSO performs at the renovated Coronado Theatre, in downtown Rockford, Illinois.

The Coronado opened on October 9, 1927, as an atmospheric style theatre and movie palace - complete with Spanish castles, Italian villas, oriental dragons, starlit skies, and a Grande Barton Pipe Organ.

After decades of use, the Coronado received a much needed facelift between 1999 and 2001, with the community-wide support of the city of Rockford, individuals and corporations. Spear-headed by the Friends of the Coronado, a non-profit organization formed in 1997, the theatre was reopened in January, 2001 after an $18.5 million restoration.

== Rockford Symphony Youth Orchestra (RSYO) ==
The orchestra, with roughly sixty members, rehearses weekly and performs throughout the year. RSYO is currently under the direction of Linc Smelser.

== Citation ==
- Rockford Symphony Orchestra, The First 80 Years, published in April 2015. Written by Michele McAffee

Specific
