= List of Sphinx Head members =

Sphinx Head is a senior honor society at Cornell University. The following is a list of some of Sphinx Head's notable members.

== Academia ==
- Victor L. Butterfield (1927): eleventh president of Wesleyan University (1943–1967)
- Colin G. Campbell (1957): chairman, president, and CEO of the Colonial Williamsburg Foundation; president of Wesleyan University (1970–1988)
- Jerome "Brud" H. Holland(1939): president of Delaware State College (1953–1959) and Hampton Institute (1960–1970); U.S. ambassador to Sweden (1970–1972)

== Art and architecture ==
- Louis A. Fuertes (1897): ornithological artist
- Richmond H. Shreve (1902): architect who led the construction of the Empire State Building
- E. Stewart Williams (1932): modernist architect

== Business ==
- Walker L. Cisler (1922): chairman of Detroit Edison Company (1948–1964); founder of National Academy of Engineering
- Peter H. Coors (1969): chairman of the Coors Brewing Company
- Kenneth T. Derr (1958): chairman and CEO of Chevron Corporation (1989–1999)
- Samuel C. Johnson, Jr. (1950): former Chairperson of S. C. Johnson & Son, Inc.
- Robert D. Kennedy (1954): president and CEO of Union Carbide (1986–1995)
- Charles F. Knight (1957): Emerson Electric CEO (1973–2000), president (1986–1988, 1995–1997)
- Oscar G. Mayer, Jr. (1934): business executive who served as chairman of Oscar Mayer
- Jansen Noyes Jr. (1939): investment banker
- Robert W. Purcell (1932): businessman and philanthropist
- Eugene Tonkonogy (1926): entrepreneur
- Maxwell M. Upson (1899): president of Raymond International Inc.

== Entertainment ==
- Daniel E. Duryea (1928): film and TV actor immortalized on the Hollywood Walk of Fame; actor in four Broadway shows
- Richard "Dick" J. Schaap (1955): sports broadcaster; received two Emmy Awards; author and co-author of 33 books
- Dominique Thorne (2019): actress
- Franchot Tone (1927): actor nominated for an Academy Award for Best Actor in 1935 for Mutiny on the Bounty (1935)

== Law ==
- Frederick D. Colson (1900): Deputy Attorney General of New York State (1915–1924)
- Elbert P. Tuttle (1918): chief judge of the U.S. Court of Appeals for the Fifth Circuit in Atlanta, Georgia

== Military ==
- Daniel P. Meyer (1986): executive director for intelligence community whistleblowing & source protection (ICW&SP); former naval officer and whistleblower during the investigation into the explosion on board battleship USS Iowa (BB-61)
- John M. Paxton, Jr. (1973): United States Marine Corps general officer; 33rd assistant commandant of the Marine Corps; previously commanding general, II Marine Expeditionary Force; previously J-3, director for operations for The Joint Chiefs of Staff
- George R. Pfann (1924): secretary of staff to General George S. Patton during his campaign in North Africa, Sicily, and Germany; Rhodes Scholar

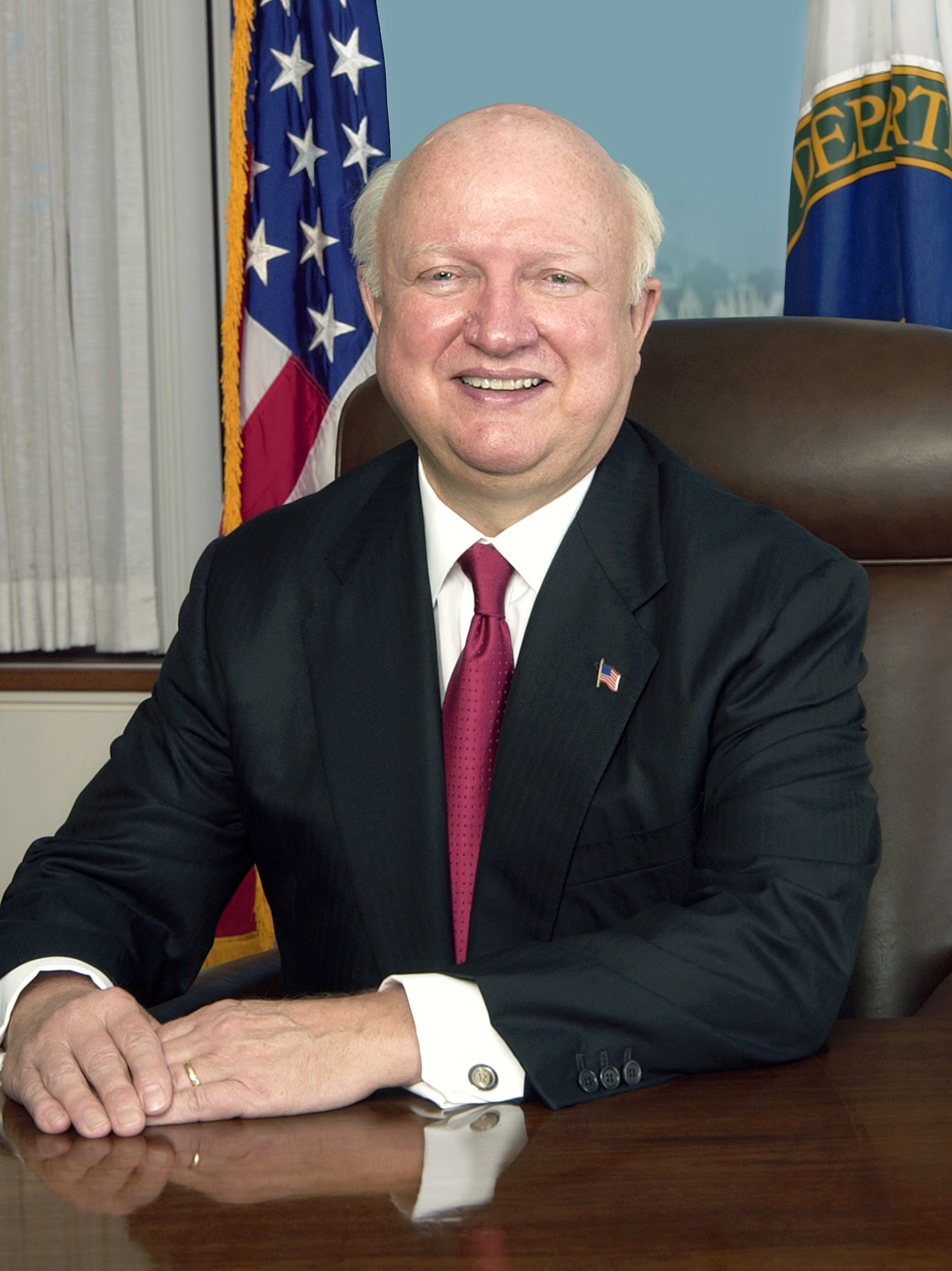
Samuel Bodman, the 11th United States Secretary of Energy

== Politics ==
- Neal D. Becker (1905): member of the Council on Foreign Relations; co-founder of the American Australian Association in 1948
- Samuel W. Bodman (1961): former United States Secretary of Energy (2005–2009), former Deputy Secretary of the Treasury (2004), and former Deputy Secretary of Commerce (2001–2004)
- Thomas C. Hennings, Jr. (1924): U.S. Congress representative for Missouri 11th District (1934–1940); Senator of Missouri (1951–1960)
- Theodore Kheel (1935): executive director of the National War Labor Board; author of The Keys to Conflict Resolution
- Samuel R. Pierce, Jr. (1944): Secretary of the United States Department of Housing and Urban Development (1981–1989)
- Thomas C. Reed (1955): nuclear weapons expert; U.S. Secretary of the Air Force from January 2, 1976 – April 6, 1977; 6th Director of the National Reconnaissance Office (August, 1976 – April 1977)
- Henry S. Reuss (1933): U.S. Congress representative for Wisconsin (1955–1983); co-founder of the Peace Corps
- Willard D. Straight (1901): U.S. diplomat
- Frank L. Sundstrom (1924): U.S. Congress representative for New Jersey 11th District (1943–1949)

== Sports ==
- Charles Ackerly (1920): gold medalist in wrestling (132 lb. weight class) at the 1920 Olympic Games
- Jon P. Anderson (1971): winner of the 1973 Boston Marathon and member of the 1972 US Olympic track and field team
- Tell S. Berna (1912): gold medalist in the 3000m team track & field event at the 1912 Olympic Games
- Romeyn Berry (1904): graduate manager of Cornell Athletics (1919–1935)
- Dave Bliss (1965): former head basketball coach of Baylor University and Southern Methodist University; major participant in the Baylor University basketball scandal
- Babe Clark (1914): American football player
- Ivan C. Dresser (1919): gold medalist in the 3000 meter track & field event at the 1920 Olympic Games
- Charles M. French (1909): Olympic athlete in the 800m race in the 1908 Olympic Games
- Peter K. Gogolak (1964): football player for the New York Giants, Buffalo Bills
- Robert J. Kane (1934): president of the U.S. Olympic Committee (1977–1980); director of athletics at Cornell (1946–1971)
- Eddie L. Kaw (1923): inducted into the College Football Hall of Fame in 1954
- Edward B. Kirby (1924): bronze medalist in the 3000m team track & field event at the 1924 Olympic Games
- Jeff Mathews (2014): professional football player, Atlanta Falcons
- Rob Pannell (2012): NCAA Division I Men's Lacrosse all-time points leader; the Ivy League's first-ever three-time Player of the Year award winner; ESPY nominee; recipient of the 2013 Tewaaraton Trophy; currently plays for the Long Island Lizards
- Seth C. Payne (1997): professional football player (Houston Texans)
- Edward T. Peterson (1948): professional basketball player with the Syracuse Nationals and Tri-Cities Blackhawks
- Leo J. Reherman (1988): professional football player (Miami Dolphins); competed on American Gladiators as "Hawk" (1993–1996); sports broadcaster for ESPN
- Henry A. Russell (1926): gold medalist in the 4 × 100 m race track & field event at the 1928 Olympic Games
- Richard "Dick" Savitt (1950): professional tennis player; winner of Wimbledon and the Australian Open in 1951
- Maxwell O. Seibald (2009): four-time All-American Lacrosse player; recipient of the 2009 Tewaaraton Trophy; currently plays for the Denver Outlaws
- John L. Senior (1901): first graduate manager of athletics for Cornell University (1901–1907)
- Bryan Walters (2010): wide receiver for the Jacksonville Jaguars of the National Football League
- William J. Warner (1903): inducted into the College Football Hall of Fame in 1971
