= The Lantern =

Student newspaper of Ohio State University

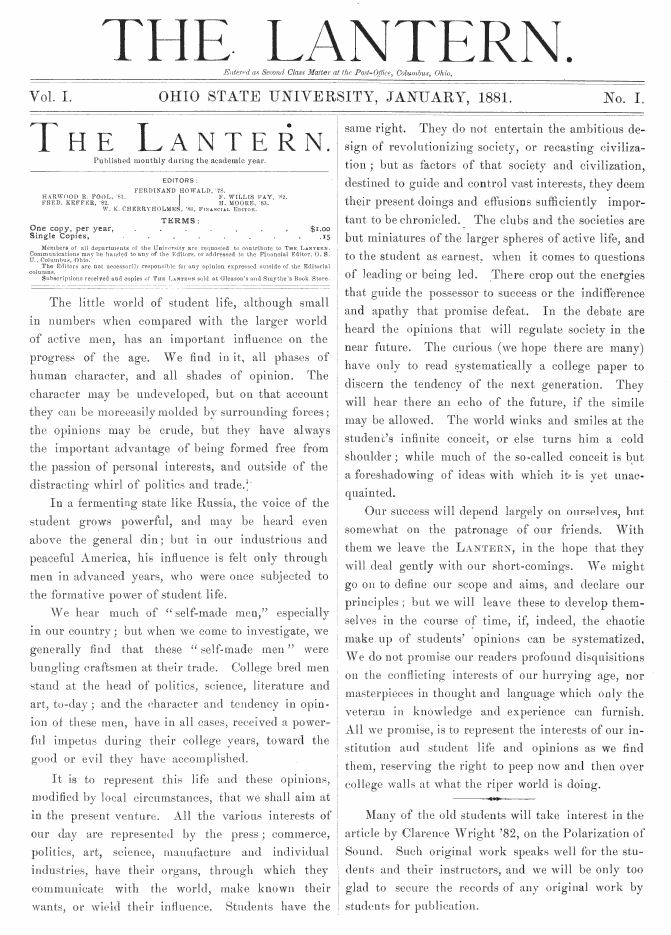
- The first issue of The Lantern, published Jan. 1, 1881
- Type: Student newspaper
- School: Ohio State University
- Founded: 1881; 145 years ago
- Headquarters: Journalism Building; 242 W. 18th Ave. Columbus, Ohio
- Circulation: 15,000
- Website: www.thelantern.com
- Free online archives: The Lantern Digital Archives

The Lantern is an independent daily newspaper in Columbus, Ohio, published by students at the Ohio State University. It is one of the largest campus newspapers in the United States, reaching a circulation of 15,000.

Copies of the paper are free and available on campus and throughout Columbus. Editions are published in print Wednesday with online content published daily. It does not print in the summer but provides original online content.

The Lantern received attention in 2011 when it reported some members of the school's football team had been selling memorabilia for money and tattoos, violating NCAA rules. In 2019, it earned the Student Press Law Center's Reveille Seven College Press Freedom Award for its pursuit of public records.

== History ==
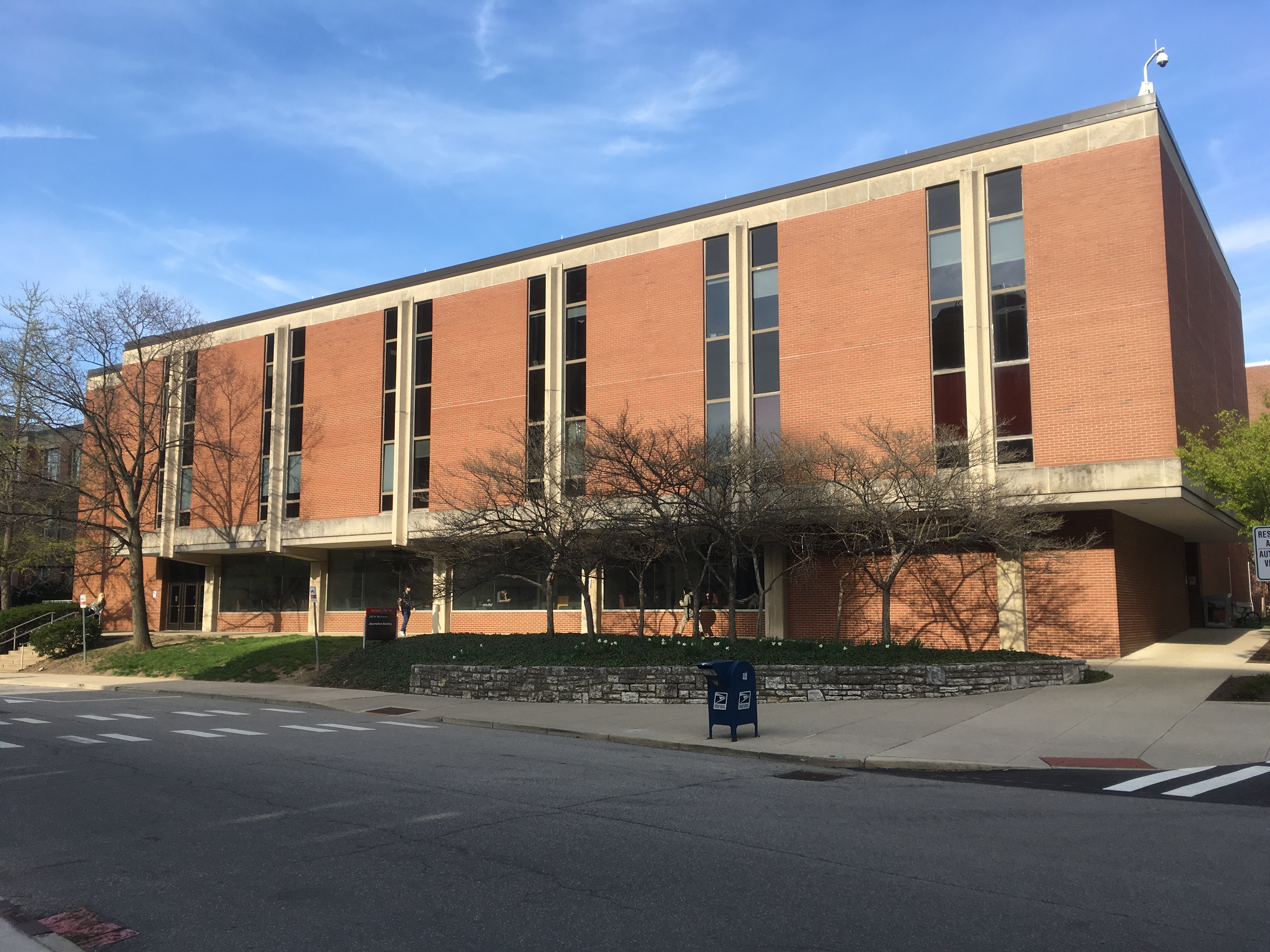
The Journalism Building, on the Ohio State University main campus.

The paper was chartered in 1881. In 1913, OSU student Frank Mason criticized then-Ohio Governor James M. Cox in the newspaper. The student recommended the school be renamed the "University of Ohio" for more prestige, while the governor reneged due to pressure from Ohio University alumni. Mason's editorial was republished in every daily newspaper in Ohio after AP syndication. Cox (also owner of the Dayton Daily News) told OSU's president William Oxley Thompson to discipline Mason. Thompson asked Joseph S. Myers, the alumni secretary and a Pittsburgh journalist, to head a journalism department and to censor The Lantern against criticizing the governor. Myers created the Ohio State University School of Journalism.

Before 1914, The Lantern was published outside of the university, and writers and editors divided the newspaper's profits. The School of Journalism took on the paper that year, and the newsroom moved to the basement of the original University Hall that year. In 1924, the school moved to a new two-story building, known as the Journalism Building.

In 1965, a riot took place on campus following the arrest of Marjorie Cocoziello, a student fined for jaywalking who had not paid her ticket in time. Reporters for The Lantern published Cocoziello's accounts of a strip-search, being put in a dark cell, and being watched by a cruel jailer. After an investigation, The Columbus Dispatch chided the paper for reporting on the issue so prominently, and only with Cocoziello's side of the story, helping spur the riot.

In September 1974, the old Journalism Building was gutted, and a third story and basement were added. The expansion made for a larger newsroom for the paper, and offices for the paper's advisor, teletype machines, film processing, a library, and a meeting room.

In 1975, student reporters for The Lantern took up investigation of the murder of 14-year-old Christie Lynn Mullins in a wooded area north of campus. Most newspapers in the city already moved to other stories, but two Lantern journalists, Jim Yavorcik and Rick Kelly, retraced the scene, interviewed key people the police had overlooked, and discovered that the police's suspect, Jack Allen Carmen, could not have reached the crime scene in time. The Columbus Monthly gave the two journalists permission to publish in their magazine, which prompted a new trial and the suspect's release. Another Lantern reporter from the same era, John Oller, performed an investigation and wrote a book about the case almost 40 years later which led to the police naming the true killer.

In 1992, The Lantern was one of several U.S. student newspapers to publish a column from Bradley Smith that questioned whether the Holocaust took place. The Lantern's republication resulted in a 250-student protest at the journalism school; the editor refused to apologize or retract the work. The Lantern had published Smith's column with context – a column disparaging Smith's view of history, an anti-Holocoust-denier cartoon, an interview with Smith, and a seven-paragraph explanation of why the paper published the work. In addition to the protest, the paper received negative calls and two altercations, including one involving a student arrested after attempting to force his way into the newsroom.

In Spring 2010, a situation occurred on campus in which two cows escaped from the Veterinary Hospital, and started running loose on campus. After several vet students and faculty were trampled in attempts to wrangle the animals, the Ohio State University Police cordoned off several areas of campus, and eventually resorted to force to stop the cows, who were eventually tranquilized and recaptured with assistance of staff from the Columbus Zoo and Aquarium. During the commotion, a student photographer from The Lantern purportedly disobeyed orders from police officers to leave the area. After claiming freedom of the press, he was arrested for the misconduct. The School of Communication protested the arrest, though the school did not provide the photographer legal aid. Many other journalism outlets took his side, and the photographer was never charged.

Months after news broke that Ohio State quarterback Terrelle Pryor, as well as several other teammates, had been involved with selling memorabilia for tattoos and money, The Lantern published a story on May 25, 2011, in which former football player Ray Small admitted to also selling memorabilia for money. The two reporters on the story, editor-in-chief Zack Meisel and sports reporter James Oldham, received threats from angry Ohio State fans as a result. Meisel, Oldham and The Lantern received national attention for their coverage, including appearances on ESPN's Outside the Lines and in The Wall Street Journal, among others. Head football coach Jim Tressel resigned on May 31, 2011, in response to the scandal.

In 2020, amid the George Floyd protests taking place worldwide, Lantern journalists covered protests in Columbus. During one of the protests on June 1, police forced the paper's journalists away and pepper sprayed them for breaking a mandatory curfew, despite an exemption for journalists among other groups. The incident was put under independent investigation in the following month.

On September 23, 2022, an all-years Lantern reunion, the first in the paper's 141-year history, was held at the Fawcett Center just off campus, with about 150 Lantern alumni from different eras in attendance.

== Publication ==
The Lantern is a laboratory paper that is put together daily by students in the newsroom of the Journalism Building. There are 29 paid student editors and assistant editors, including print, photo and video editors, who change after completion of two academic semesters. Student reporters, most of whom contribute through the Lantern practicum class, are not paid.

The current faculty adviser for The Lantern is Spencer Hunt, a former reporter at the Columbus Dispatch and Cincinnati Enquirer.

The Lantern publishes all of its news on its website. Visitors may also view print editions of the paper, made available by Issuu.

In addition to the stories in print, the website includes a multimedia section for photo slide shows, videos and a weekly video webcast. Sports and Arts & Life podcasts are also posted on the website.

Sections of The Lantern include Campus, Sports, and Arts and Life.

== Awards ==
In 2011, The Lantern won the "General Excellence" award from the Ohio Newspaper Association (current-day Ohio News Media Association), deeming it the top collegiate newspaper in the state of Ohio. The Lantern's seven wins in the categories of editorial writing, sports coverage, headline writing, photojournalism, design, best newspaper website and news coverage combined to give the newspaper the General Excellence award.

The Lantern also won "Best College Daily Newspaper" in Ohio by the Ohio chapter of the Society of Professional Journalists in 2011.

In 2018, The Lantern won "Best College Newspaper: Non-Daily" in Ohio for the Ohio SPJ Awards. Additionally, reporters also won first and second place for "Best College Feature Writing," "Best College News Writing," and "Best College Sports Writing."

In 2022, The Lantern was recorded as having the third most social engagement of any student run newspaper in the U.S. The publication had 395,020 total shares and online engagement throughout the 2021-2022 academic year. In that same year, the newspaper had an average of 225 shares per article, making it the third highest in the U.S.

== Notable alumni ==
- Leonard Downie Jr., former executive editor of The Washington Post
- W. M. Kiplinger, founder of Kiplinger
- Henry C. Segal, longtime journalist and editor
- Earl Wilson, newspaper columnist
- Jeff Smith, author of Bone; its predecessor, Thorn, was published in The Lantern
