= Cum Laude Society =

Organization that honors academic achievement at secondary institutions

- Founded: 1906; 120 years ago Tome School
- Type: Honor
- Affiliation: Independent
- Status: Active
- Emphasis: High School Scholastics
- Scope: International
- Motto: Areté, Diké, Timé "Excellence, Justice, Honor"
- Chapters: 382
- Members: 4,000 active
- Former name: Alpha Delta Tau
- Headquarters: 9462 Brownsboro Road, Suite #359; Louisville, Kentucky 40241; United States
- Website: www.cumlaudesociety.org

The Cum Laude Society is an international organization that honors academic achievement at secondary institutions, similar to the Phi Beta Kappa, which honors academic achievements at the university level.

== History ==
The Cum Laude Society was founded in 1906 at the Tome School in Port Deposit, Maryland, as the Alpha Delta Tau fraternity. Its founder was Dr. A. W. Harris, then director of the Tome School. It was established to encourage and recognize scholastic achievement of secondary school students. Harris also wanted to encourage community and alumni support for secondary schools.

Alpha Delta Tau was created to be similar to the collegiate society, Phi Beta Kappa. It was the first organization of its type for secondary schools in the United States. Only the top fifth of a school senior class was eligible for membership in the fraternity. Originally, it admitted both students and faculty. Its first president was Robert W. Tunstall, head of the ancient languages department at Tome.

By December 1908, the society had established chapters at Brooklyn Collegiate and Polytechnic Institute, Centenary Collegiate Institute, the Evanston Academy, Phillips Academy, Phillips Exeter Academy, and William Penn Charter School. The society held its first national convention at Boston University in January 1909. Delegates attended from Tome School, Evanston Academy, Phillips Exeter Academy, and William Penn Charter School. Harris, then president of Northwestern University, became the first president general. Dr. H. L. Rich of Tome School was elected its first secretary general. The fraternity's board of regents set goals of expansion, countering the influence of athletics, and encouraging support for academics.

To avoid confusion with the social college fraternity, Alpha Delta Tau changed its name to the Cum Laude Society in 1916. At the same time, its constitution was changed to admit girls; the society was originally male-only because of Maryland's laws. It also limited its chapters to public schools or non-profit private schools.

By 1927, Cum Laude Society had 51 chapters and more than 4,000 total initiates. As of 2025, it initiates 4,000 members a year and has 382 chapters. Its national headquarters is in Louisville, Kentucky.

== Symbols ==
The society's logo is based on the original logo of Alpha Delta Tau and features a stylized Greek letter Tau. Its motto is Areté, Diké, Timé, which translates as "Excellence, Justice, Honor". Originally, initiates were recognized with a badge and a golden yellow ribbon.

== Membership ==
Participating secondary institutions may nominate up to twenty percent of their graduating class for induction into the society.

== Chapters ==
The Cum Laude Society has 382 chapters, all but 24 of which are at private or independent schools in the United States. Chapters are located in the United States, Canada, England, France, the Philippines, and Spain.

== Notable members ==
- Dana Delany, actress
- Reza Dana, ophthalmologist and immunologist
- Adelaide Gay, professional soccer player
- Roswell Gilpatric, United States Deputy Secretary of Defense and United States Under Secretary of the Air Force
- Michael Huffington, United States House of Representatives
- Knight Kiplinger, economic journalist and editor in chief of the Kiplinger financial media company
- Peter Moore, Sterling Professor emeritus of chemistry, molecular biophysics, and biochemistry at Yale University
- Ankur Rathee, actor
- Richard Stothers, astronomer and planetary scientist with the Goddard Institute for Space Studies
- Kyle Zimmer, professional baseball player

== See also ==
- Honor society
- National Honor Society
- Latin honors
