= White Shoes (disambiguation) =

White Shoes is a country album by Emmylou Harris.

White Shoes may also refer to:

- White Shoes & The Couples Company — Indonesian pop band
- Billy "White Shoes" Johnson — American football player
- White-shoe firm — long-standing, elite, American professional services firm
- White Shoe: How a New Breed of Wall Street Lawyers Changed Big Business and the American Century — 2019 book by John Oller

== See also ==
- The White Shoes (disambiguation)
