= Leon Chatelain Jr. =

American architect (1902–1979)

- Born: March 8, 1902; Washington, D.C.
- Died: May 6, 1979 (aged 77); Washington, D.C.
- Occupation: Architect

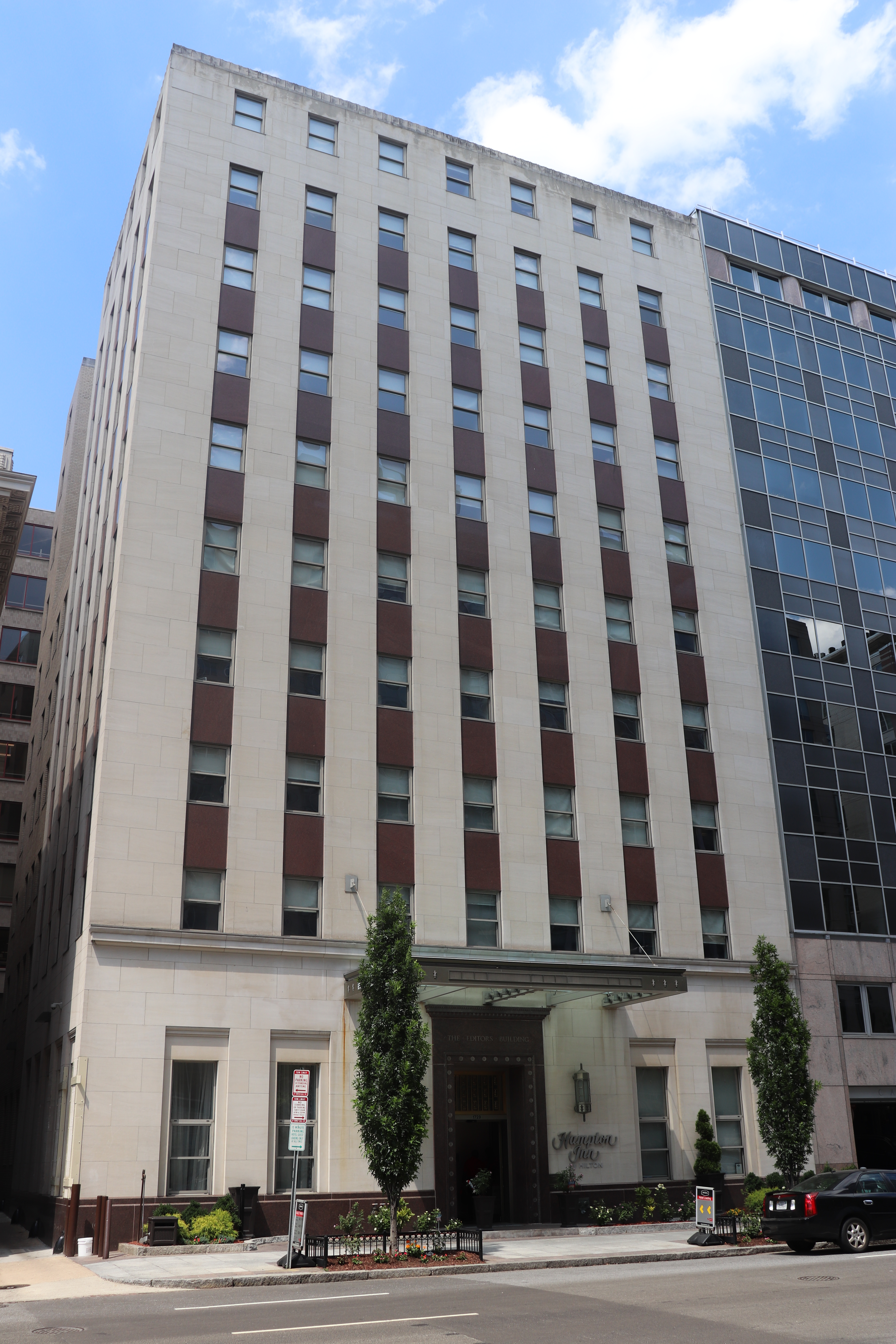
The Editors Building in Washington, D.C., designed by Chatelain and completed in 1950.

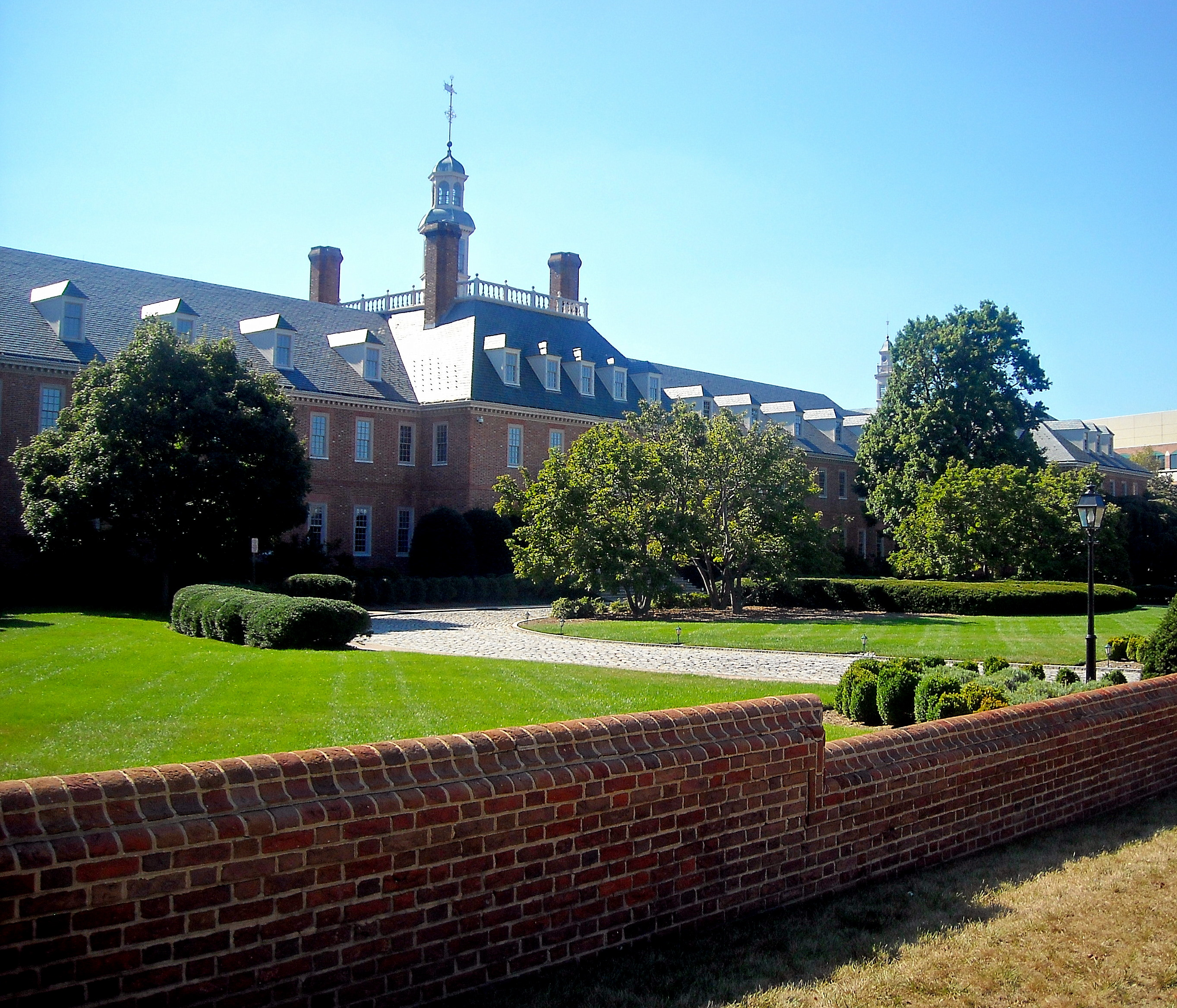
The Washington, D.C., headquarters of the Equitable Life Insurance Company, later Fannie Mae, designed by Chatelain, Gauger & Nolan and completed in 1958.

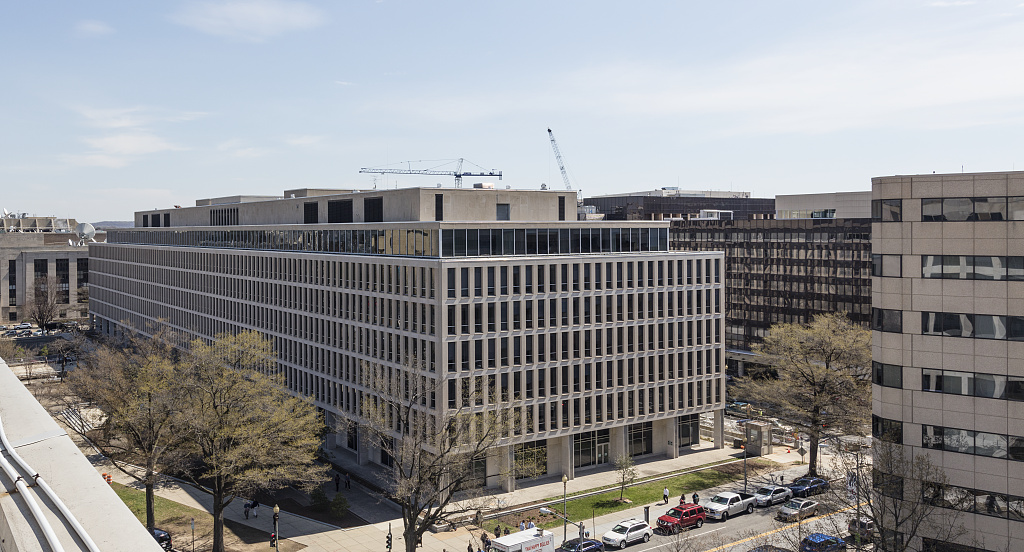
The Lyndon Baines Johnson Department of Education Building in Washington, D.C., designed by Chatelain, Gauger & Nolan and Faulkner, Kingsbury & Stenhouse and completed in 1961.

Leon Chatelain Jr. FAIA (1902–1979) was an American architect in practice in Washington, D.C., from 1932 to 1974. From 1956 to 1958 he was president of the American Institute of Architects.

== Life and career ==
Leon Chatelain Jr. was born March 8, 1902, in Washington, D.C. He attended the Washington public schools, and took night classes at George Washington University, but did not graduate. He worked for Municipal Architect Albert L. Harris and for Arthur B. Heaton and Philip M. Jullien before opening his own office in 1932. Over the next twenty years Chatelain developed a large and diverse practice centered on Washington. In 1956 he formed a partnership with employees Earl V. Gauger and James J. Nolan Jr. in the new firm of Chatelain, Gauger & Nolan. They were later joined by Edmund R. Purves as an associate. In 1970 the firm was reorganized as Chatelain, Samperton & Nolan with the retirement of Gauger and the addition of John S. Samperton. In 1973 Chatelain's son, Leon Chatelain III, joined the partnership, and in 1974 the elder Chatelain retired due to his declining health.

Chatelain joined the American Institute of Architects (AIA) in 1930 as a member of the Washington chapter. He served as chapter president and on several national committees. In 1953 he was elected a Fellow, and was elected treasurer in 1954. In 1956 he was elected president, succeeding George Bain Cummings. He was reelected in 1957. As president he oversaw the AIA's centennial celebrations.

Chatelain was well known as an advocate for disabled people. He was a member of the President's Committee for Employment of the Handicapped and chaired the National Commission on Architectural Barriers to Rehabilitation of the Handicapped, the report of which directly led to the Architectural Barriers Act of 1968. He also served as president of Easterseals. After his death, in recognition of his work Easterseals created the Leon Chatelain Award for "outstanding leadership in advancing barrier-free environments for people with handicaps." Recipients of this award have included architects Edward H. Matthei (1979) and Robert C. Broshar (1983).

== Personal life ==
Chatelain was married in 1945 to Mary Wysong. They had three children, including Leon Chatelain III. In later life Chatelain suffered from Parkinson's disease, and died May 6, 1979, in Washington at the age of 77.

== Legacy ==
Two buildings designed by Chatelain and his associates have been listed on the United States National Register of Historic Places.

== List of architectural works ==
- Washington Gas Building, (Note: Designed in association with Jarrett C. White.) 1100 H St NW, Washington, D.C. (1940–41)
- Telephone company headquarters, Washington, D.C. (1948)
- Westmoreland Congregational Church, 1 Westmoreland Cir NW, Bethesda, Maryland (1948)
- Editors Building, 1729 H St NW, Washington, D.C. (1949–50, NRHP 2015)
- McDonough Gymnasium, Georgetown University, Washington, D.C. (1950–51)
- Equitable Life Insurance Company headquarters, 3900 Wisconsin Ave NW, Washington, D.C. (1956–58, NRHP 2019)
- Associated General Contractors of America headquarters, 1957 E St NW, Washington, D.C. (1958, demolished)
- American Trucking Associations headquarters, 1616 P St NW, Washington, D.C. (1960)
- Lyndon Baines Johnson Department of Education Building, (Note: Designed in association with Faulkner, Kingsbury & Stenhouse.) 400 Maryland Ave SW, Washington, D.C. (1959–61)
- FDIC headquarters, (Note: Designed in association with Perkins & Will.) 550 17th St NW, Washington, D.C. (1961–63)
- Telephone building, Washington, D.C. (1964)
- Fairland Data Center, 13101 Columbia Pk, Silver Spring, Maryland (1966)
- Suffridge Building, 1775 K St NW, Washington, D.C. (1969)
- United States National Mine Health and Safety Academy, 1301 Airport Rd, Beaver, West Virginia (1972–76)
