= Broshar =

Broshar is a surname. Notable people with the surname include:

- Robert C. Broshar (1931–2017), American architect
- Sarah Broshar (born 1980), American film editor
