= National library of the United States =

National library of the United States may refer to:

- Library of Congress (LOC)
- United States National Agricultural Library (NAL)
- National Library of Education (United States) (NLE)
- United States National Library of Medicine (NLM)
- National Transportation Library (NTL)

== See also ==
- National library
