= Editors Building =

Historic building in Washington, D.C., US

- The Editors Building
- U.S. National Register of Historic Places
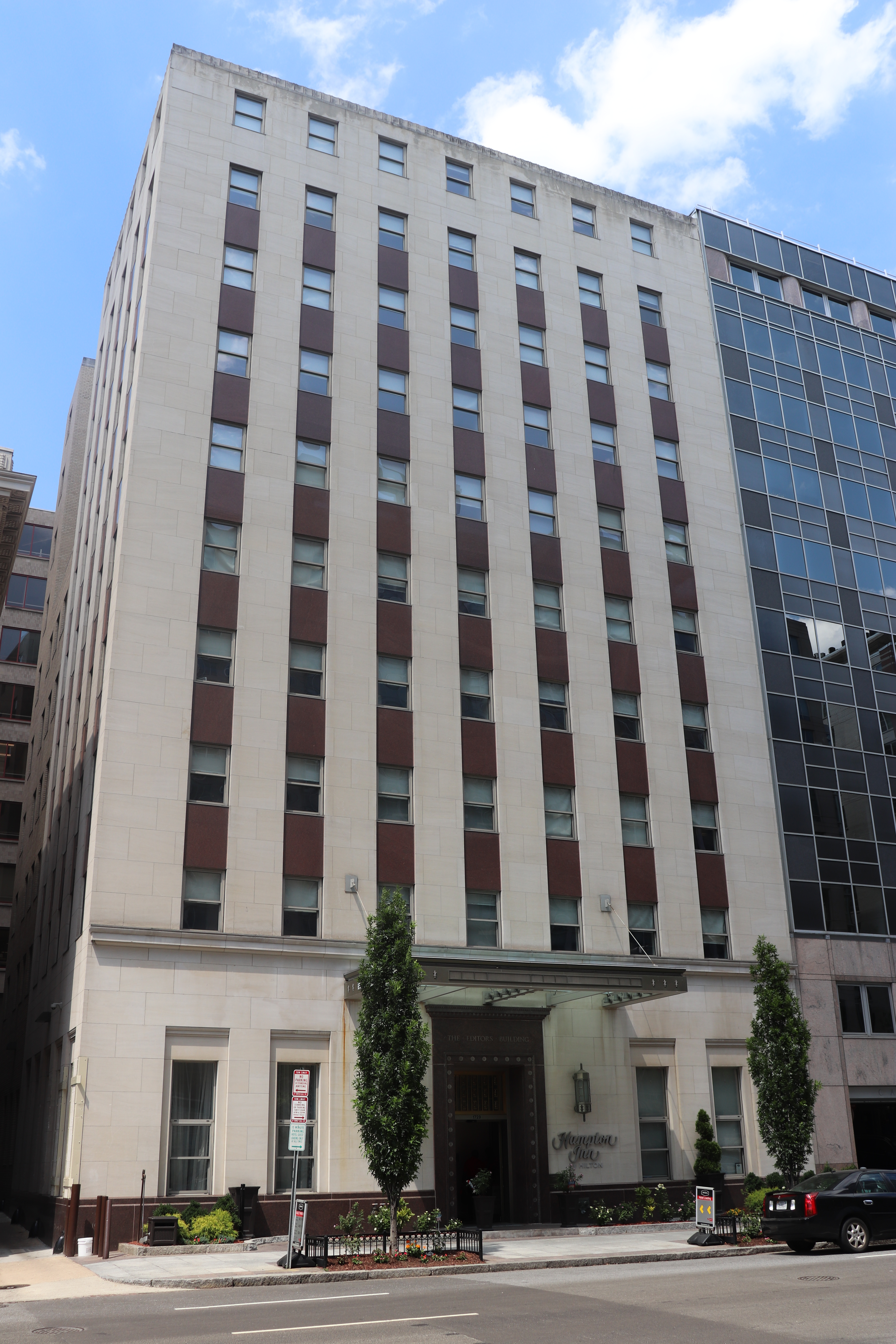
- Editors Building in 2018

- Location within District of Columbia
- Location: 1729 H Street, NW, Washington, D.C.
- Coordinates: 38°54′01″N 77°02′28″W
- Area: less than one acre
- Built: 1949; 77 years ago
- Architect: Leon Chatelain Jr.
- Architectural style: Stripped Classical
- NRHP reference No.: 15000072
- Added to NRHP: March 17, 2015

The Editors Building, also known as the Kiplinger Building, is a hotel and former historic office building located in Washington, D.C. The ten-story structure was built between 1949 and 1950, and was originally constructed as the headquarters of the Kiplinger Washington Editors, a financial advice publishing firm based in the city. It was built by the D.C.-based architect Leon Chatelain Jr. and designed in the Stripped Classical style, featuring a mostly unornamented façade with significant vertical massing. W.M. Kiplinger, the business's founder, was an avid collector of D.C.-area memorabilia, and he displayed his 7,000-piece collection in the Editors Building's lobby, hallways, and offices.

The publishing agency kept its headquarters located in the building until selling it in 2011. The new owners kept the exterior intact while gutting the interior, and in 2013 it reopened as a Hampton Inn hotel. The building was listed on the National Register of Historic Places in 2015.

== Architecture ==
The Editors Building was constructed of a frame made of steel and concrete and faced with limestone. In general, the building conforms to the classical column–like structure of base, shaft, and capital that was common of tall office buildings of the early part of the 20th century, but differs from earlier examples in its more modern, less ornamented Stripped Classical design. It stands ten stories tall, and consists of a two-story base of five bays and an eight-story shaft with a seven-bay width. The base includes a central entrance which features recessed double doors made of bronze surrounded by an architrave of pink granite decorated with rosettes and topped with a frieze containing the engraved words "THE EDITORS BUILDING" in sans-serif capitals.

The building's shaft is largely unornamented, with windows that are delineated vertically by the limestone walls and horizontally by spandrels made of pink granite. The result is one of emphasized verticality. In keeping with the design's muted style, the structure's capital is merely an attic of seven windows with a fluted cornice. The building's west-facing elevation consists of nine bays of windows set similarly to the front façade. The eastern side, however, was built with no windows as it was anticipated that later construction (what became the Matomic Operating Company building) would abut that elevation.

The building's vestibule and lobby were built with walls and floors made of Tennessee gray marble. Elevators in the lobby provided access to the rest of the building, including W.M. Kiplinger's office on the ninth floor, the publisher's envelope-addressing machinery on the fourth, and a small bowling alley located in the basement.

== History ==
In 1920, W.M. Kiplinger, a former journalist for the Associated Press, formed the Kiplinger Washington Agency in an attempt to bridge the information gap between investors on Wall Street and legislators in the nation's capital. Three years later he started the Kiplinger Washington Letter, a periodical aimed at providing commercial interests with insight into the workings of the U.S. Treasury and Federal Reserve. Subscriptions to the Letter increased steadily through the 1930s as the periodical served as a means for American businesses to understand the legislation and policies of the New Deal.

The agency's headquarters were located in the National Press Building, but with more than 200 employees by the 1940s, the company needed larger accommodations. Kiplinger acquired a site in Lafayette Square and received a $1 million permit for construction. The company hired Leon Chatelain Jr., a local architect responsible for many residential, commercial, and church buildings in the area, to design the new structure. Work began in 1949, and W.M. Kiplinger stayed involved with the process, becoming friendly with the construction staff and learning various jobs on site. A contemporary news report claimed that his work "earned him 87 cents after union dues and Social Security."

Kiplinger had every person who worked on the structure put their signature on a large cloth which was later framed and hung in the building. Notable guests of the company, including Norman Rockwell, would later add their own signatures to the wall. Upon the building's completion in October 1950, Kiplinger held a party for the site's 800 laborers and gave each a silver dollar.

Since the 1920s, Kiplinger had collected memorabilia related to the history of Washington, D.C. With a total of over 7,000 items, the collection was considered one of the largest of Washingtonia held privately. Kiplinger decorated the walls of the office building's lobby, hallways, and an exhibition room with much of the collection, and an archival room on site held more. New employees were allowed to visit the archives with a curator and choose pieces to display in their offices. The agency occasionally made exhibits of the collection available for public view in the building.

The company's continued expansion necessitated the construction of a second building at the end of the 1950s, this one located in the suburbs of D.C. One hundred employees remained in the Editors Building, and while the company leased some space there to other businesses, the Kiplinger Agency remained the primary tenant at the site into the 21st century. In 2011, the company moved to a Franklin Square location previously used by the Associated Press, and the following year the Editors Building was sold to a South Carolina–based developer.

The new owners performed a major renovation in order to convert the building into a Hampton Inn hotel. Other than an awning added to the entrance, the structure's exterior was kept largely intact, but the interior saw a near-complete overhaul. One area that was retained was Kiplinger's former ninth-floor office. The walnut-paneled room with fireplace and mantel was turned into a penthouse suite. The wall containing the signatures of the building's workforce and other guests was kept as well, and pieces of Kiplinger's art collection were kept on display in the hotel. In 2015, the building was listed on the National Register of Historic Places.

== See also ==
- National Register of Historic Places listings in Washington, D.C.
