= Knight Kiplinger =

American journalist

Knight Austin Kiplinger [KIP-ling-er] (born February 24, 1948) is an American economic journalist and former head the Kiplinger financial media company in Washington, D.C., publishers of business forecasts and personal finance advice.

Until the company's sale in 2019, he was CEO and editor in chief of all its publications, including the weekly Kiplinger Letter, monthly Kiplinger's Personal Finance magazine and daily Kiplinger.com. He wrote a bimonthly column on financial matters in the magazine and also wrote its monthly "Money & Ethics" feature, which explores ethical dilemmas in consumer affairs, business, and family relations. He continues to work for the company in an advisory capacity as editor emeritus.

In the civic realm, Kiplinger is active in nonprofit governance and philanthropy, especially in the fields of secondary education, choral music, and historic preservation.

He is a frequent guest on radio and TV programs (on NPR, CNN, Fox and CNBC, among others) and has appeared on "The Diane Rehm Show", "Charlie Rose Show", "The Today Show", "CBS This Morning," and “Wall Street Week with Louis Rukeyser”. He is an occasional commentator on "Marketplace," the daily business report heard on public radio stations nationwide.

As a public speaker, Kiplinger frequently addresses audiences of corporate and civic leaders, on such topics as the economic outlook, politics, investing and ethical business management.

Kiplinger is the co-author and editor of several books, including World Boom Ahead (1998), with David Koenig and the staff of The Kiplinger Letter; America in the Global '90s (1989), with Jack Kiesner, Austin Kiplinger (his father) and The Kiplinger Letter staff; The New American Boom (1986), with Sidney Levy and the staff of The Kiplinger Letter; and Washington Now (1975), with Austin Kiplinger.

== Childhood and education ==
Kiplinger was born on February 24, 1948, in Washington, D.C., the second of two sons of journalist Austin H. Kiplinger (1918-2015), a native of Washington, D.C., and Mary Louise (Gogo) Cobb Kiplinger (1919–2007), who was born in Bronxville, New York, and reared in Chicago and Winnetka, Illinois. (His first and middle names—Knight and Austin—were the surnames of his maternal and paternal grandmothers, respectively; he is not related to John S. and James L. Knight, of the newspaper-publishing family.)

He moved with his family to Northfield, Illinois, as an infant in 1948, when his father left the Kiplinger organization in Washington to take a job as the front-page columnist of the Chicago Journal of Commerce and later went into radio and television news with local Chicago stations and the ABC and NBC networks.

Kiplinger returned to the Washington area with his family in 1956 and attended elementary school in North Chevy Chase, Maryland. He enrolled in the seventh grade at Landon School, a private boys’ school in Bethesda, Maryland, when his parents restored and moved to "Montevideo," an historic farm in Seneca, Maryland, 20 miles northwest of Washington, D.C. As a boy he played piano and folk guitar, swam on a community team, competed in equestrian events with the Seneca Valley Pony Club and foxhunted with the Potomac Hunt.

In the summer of 1963, he joined his father and older brother, Todd, to march in the massive civil rights rally on the Washington Mall, where the Rev. Martin Luther King Jr. delivered his "I Have a Dream" speech. Kiplinger graduated from Landon in 1965, a member of the Cum Laude Society, president of the student council, and winner of the Headmaster's Award for the most outstanding graduating senior.

Kiplinger majored in government and history in the College of Arts and Sciences at Cornell University, graduating in 1969. He was a member of the Alpha Delta Phi fraternity and was elected president of Quill and Dagger, a senior men's honorary society for student leaders. During the summer of 1968 he was an aide and writer in the U.S. House campaign of Democratic candidate John S. Dyson, a Cornell friend (class of ‘65) who narrowly lost to Republican Hamilton Fish in the general election for the congressional seat in the mid-Hudson region of New York State. He researched and wrote the draft for Dyson's book Our Historic Hudson, a historical and cultural guide to the region.

After graduating from Cornell, Kiplinger enrolled in the two-year master's degree program at Princeton University's Woodrow Wilson School of Public and International Affairs, majoring in economic development studies. He left Princeton after one year to work at the Sentinel in Rockville.

He met his future wife, Ann Sheldon Miller, a special-education teacher, at a chorus rehearsal in 1979 and married her later that year. They are the parents of three children: Brigham Cobb Kiplinger (b. 1981), Sutton Elizabeth Kiplinger (b. 1983) and Daphne Lambert Kiplinger (b. 1985), all of whom work in professions unrelated to journalism and publishing.

== Journalism career ==
Kiplinger started his professional reporting career in 1970, with a brief stint at the Montgomery County Sentinel, an award-winning weekly in Rockville, Maryland, under editor Roger Brooke Farquhar.

Kiplinger was a Washington correspondent (1970–73) and bureau manager (1976–78) at the Griffin-Larrabee News Bureau, which provided daily Washington coverage to more than 20 newspapers throughout the country, from Maine to Alaska, including all the community dailies of the Ottaway Newspapers subsidiary of Dow Jones & Co. One of Kiplinger's stories revealed that a Pocono Mountains (Pa.) vacation home development, whose deceptive sales practices had been cited by the federal government, was owned by a U.S. senator who sat on the committee that oversaw the regulation of interstate land sales; the senator soon sold the project.

For six years (1978–1983) Kiplinger was chief of Ottaway News Service, overseeing coverage from the chain's bureaus in Washington, Albany, Boston, and Harrisburg. Also acting as Washington bureau chief, Kiplinger wrote columns and features for the Ottaway papers.

In 1983 Kiplinger moved to the Kiplinger publishing organization (founded in 1920 by his grandfather, reporter W. M. Kiplinger) in the position of vice president for publications. In 1985 he became editor in chief of Kiplinger's Changing Times magazine (renamed Kiplinger's Personal Finance in 1991). He succeeded his father, Austin H. Kiplinger, as president of the parent company in 1992 and editor in chief of The Kiplinger Letter in 1999. (Austin Kiplinger remained as editor emeritus and non-executive chairman of the board.) Kiplinger is a member of the National Press Club, the Society of Professional Journalists, and the Society of American Business Editors and Writers.

Kiplinger believes that young adults should not go into their families’ businesses too early, until they have accomplished something on their own; otherwise they will not get an honest assessment of their abilities. “I spent the first 13 years of my journalism career in the employ of others, as a Washington correspondent and bureau chief, making my mistakes on their dime, learning reporting, editing and management before coming to Kiplinger,” he said in a 2001 interview. “When second- and third-generation leaders eventually come into a family business, there’s often a presumption of incompetence,” he quipped, “so they benefit from low expectations. If you’re actually good at what you do, others are pleasantly surprised. I’ve joked about this over the years with other publishing scions, like Don Graham [publisher of The Washington Post] and Steve Forbes. We all have our favorite nepotism jokes. Steve says he owes much of his success to his careful choice of grandparents.”

Kiplinger was instrumental in broadening the company's scope beyond subscription-based print publishing in the 1990s, to include such new ventures as audio, video, software, custom publishing and a Web site, www.Kiplinger.com. “Frankly, I’m not entirely confident the upcoming generation of 20- and 30-something executives are going to be willing to pay for information in any form,” he told an interviewer in 2007. “So our strategy is to ‘monetize’ the non-paying reader, by providing a certain amount of free content to attract them to our ad-supported Web site” and then introduce them to our subscription services.

Kiplinger Washington Editors, Inc., was a closely held company managed for more than nine decades by three generations of the Kiplinger family, until being sold in February 2019 to Dennis Publishing, a U.K.-based media company. In 2021, Future plc acquired Dennis Publishing and with it Kiplinger.

== Civic interests ==
A lifelong choral singer, Kiplinger began singing at Landon School under glee club director Dr. Hugh Hayward, M.D., then continued in the Cornell Glee Club and Sage Chapel Choir, under Thomas Sokol and Donald R. M. Paterson, respectively. In 1972 he joined the Oratorio Society of Washington (founded a decade earlier by Dr. Hayward and later renamed The Washington Chorus), and he still sings in its bass section. As members of this large chorus, Kiplinger and his wife have sung in dozens of Kennedy Center performances with the National Symphony Orchestra, under such renowned conductors as Mstislav Rostropovich, Leonard Slatkin, Seiji Ozawa, Sarah Caldwell, and Karl Richter. They also sang on its live recording of the Benjamin Britten War Requiem, conducted by Robert Shafer, which won the 2000 Grammy award for best classical choral recording. Kiplinger is a trustee and past board chair of The Washington Chorus.

“When I’m part of an artistic whole, standing in front of a demanding conductor, I forget that I’m a journalist and the boss of a company—which feels good,” he wrote in The New York Times. “I can rush from an interview at CNN to a chorus rehearsal, and suddenly I’m in a different world. Singing and yoga—these are the kinds of things that give balance to a life.”

He has been a member of the advisory board of the Children's Chorus of Washington since its founding. A longtime supporter and past trustee of the Levine School of Music, a community music school, he chaired the school's capital campaign to acquire and renovate its first permanent home in Washington, D.C.

As a trustee (and later board chair) of Landon School, he co-chaired the school's first endowment campaign. In 1998 he was honored with the Anthony Edward Kupka '64 Award, given annually to a distinguished Landon alumnus, and a few years later, he was given the school's W. Landon Banfield ’50 Award for outstanding service to the school. Kiplinger is also a member of the Cornell Council, an alumni advisory body of Cornell University.

He is on the board of directors of The White House Historical Association, which supports the furnishings and fine-arts collections of the President's home. He is on the advisory board of the historic Congressional Cemetery in Washington, the resting place of hundreds of notables from the early days of the Republic. He is a former advisory committee member of the Mount Vernon Ladies Association, which owns and manages George Washington's home in Virginia. He co-founded a campaign to restore the ruins of an historic 1802 Episcopal chapel and cemetery, Zion Church, in Urbana, Md., 35 miles north of Washington.

Kiplinger is “not a plain-vanilla moneyed guy,” according to a New York Times interview in 2004. “He’s a share-the-wealth advocate who writes hefty checks to charity and has often written advice columns that list philanthropic contributions as morally, and fiscally, right.”

He is a trustee of The Kiplinger Foundation, a family foundation created and funded by his grandfather, W. M. Kiplinger, in 1948. It supports a wide array of charities in the Washington area and nationally, in the fields of secondary and higher education, professional development for journalists, the arts, social service and historic preservation. Beginning in 1972 the foundation, under its president Austin H. Kiplinger, created and endowed a mid-career fellowship program for journalists, the Kiplinger Program in Public Affairs Journalism, at Ohio State University, in memory of W. M. Kiplinger, who was one of the college's first two journalism graduates in 1912. The foundation was also the primary funder for 25 years of a Washington, D.C. program of resident fellowships and public-policy seminars for journalists from around the country. It was later absorbed into, and became today's core mission of, the National Press Foundation.

In 2008 Kiplinger, his father and his brother were honored for their civic leadership by the Washington chapter of the Anti-Defamation League.
