= Kiplinger Personal Finance =

American magazine

- Cover of the May 2024 issue
- Editor Emeritus: Knight Kiplinger
- Editor: Mark Solheim
- Frequency: Monthly
- Total circulation: 315,757 (December 2025)
- Founded: January 1947
- Company: Kiplinger (Future plc)
- Country: United States
- Based in: Washington, D.C.
- Language: English
- Website: www.kiplinger.com
- ISSN: 1056-697X

Kiplinger Personal Finance (/ˈkɪplɪŋər/ KIP-ling-ər) is an American personal finance magazine published by Kiplinger since 1947. It claims to be the first American personal finance magazine and to deliver "sound, unbiased advice in clear, concise language". It offers advice on managing money and achieving financial security, saving, investing, planning for retirement, paying for college, and major purchases like automobiles and homes.

== History ==
W.M. Kiplinger, founder of the Kiplinger family of publications, said he founded the magazine because "The times will always be changing. Much of life and work consists of looking for the changes in advance and figuring out what to do about them." Upon initial production, the magazine was known simply as Kiplinger Magazine, changing its name to Changing Times: The Kiplinger Magazine in 1949 and was renamed to Kiplinger's Personal Finance Magazine in 1991.

Much like Forbes magazine, ownership of the Kiplinger's franchise was kept in the family until the sale of Kiplinger to Dennis Publishing in February 2019. Knight Kiplinger had succeeded his father, Austin H. Kiplinger, as the magazine's editor-in-chief until the 2019 sale to Dennis, and he currently serves as editor emeritus for Kiplinger publications.

In 2001, Kiplinger's Personal Finance announced it would acquire Individual Investor magazine.

When competitor Money magazine ceased print publication in 2019, Kiplinger's acquired roughly 400,000 of its monthly subscribers.

In 2021, Future plc acquired Dennis Publishing and with it Kiplinger's. Since then, the publication changed its name to Kiplinger Personal Finance.

== Kiplinger's CA-Simply Money ==
Kiplinger's CA-Simply Money was introduced by Computer Associates and Kiplinger's via 1-800-FREE-MONey in 1993. (Note: $6.95 Shipping/Handling)

Its competitors were Quicken and Andrew Tobias's Managing your money. Unlike its competitors, the initial version of CA-Simply Money bypassed MS-DOS, and supported Microsoft Windows. The software's unique selling proposition is that it offers "pop-up advice from Kiplinger's."

== See also ==
- List of United States magazines
