= Justin DuPratt White =

American lawyer (1869–1939)

- Born: July 25, 1869; Middletown, New York, U.S.
- Died: July 14, 1939 (aged 69)
- Resting place: Oak Hill Cemetery (Nyack, New York)
- Education: LL.B./B.A., Cornell University, 1890 LL.D Colgate University, 1936
- Occupation: Lawyer
- Organization: White & Case LLP
- Known for: Founder of White & Case law firm and chairman of the board of Cornell University
- Spouse: Anita Bradley Lombard
- Children: Mrs. Harold L. Taylor
- Honours: Chairman of the Cornell University Board of Trustees, 1939

Justin DuPratt White (July 14, 1869 – July 25, 1939) was an American attorney who co-founded White & Case, a New York City-based global law firm, in 1901. He served as a member of the Board of Trustees at Cornell University from 1928 until his death, and briefly as its chairman in 1939.

== Early life and education ==
White was born in Middletown, New York, on July 14, 1869, the third of four children born to Charles White, a merchant, and Elizabeth White.

In 1895, White graduated from Nyack High School, where he was among the first class of students to be awarded state diplomas. He was awarded a scholarship to Cornell University, where he was editor of The Cornell Daily Sun and was a member of Alpha Tau Omega fraternity. He attended Cornell Law School, where he graduated with an LL.B. in 1890, and was subsequently admitted to the New York State Bar in 1892.

== White & Case LLP ==
On May 1, 1901, White and George B. Case founded the law firm White & Case, which served prominent corporate clients, including Bankers Trust Company, Cornell University, and others.

== Honors and awards ==
In 1919, White received a Chevalier of the Legion of Honor by the French Foreign Legion. Colgate University awarded White an LLD degree in 1936. He was named a commissioner of the Palisades Interstate Park in 1900. He served as president of the Palisades Interstate Park Commission from 1925 until 1939.

== Cornell University ==
On May 5, 1928, the Cornell University Board of Trustees elected White as a trustee to fill a vacancy, and he continued to serve until his death.

While on the board, White served on the Buildings and Grounds Committee, Law School Committee, and Medical School Committee. He was elected chairman of the board of trustees in 1939, but because of his untimely death, had the shortest tenure as chairman in the university's history.

In his will, which was 30 pages long, White stipulated that any funds from his multi-million dollar beyond the first eight beneficiaries go to Cornell University.

== Legacy ==
White & Case endowed the J. DuPratt White Professorship of Law at Cornell Law School in his honor.

Academic offices
| Preceded by Frank Harris Hiscock | Chairman of Cornell Board of Trustees; 1939 | Succeeded by Howard Edward Babcock |
