= Robert C. Broshar =

American architect

- Born: May 20, 1931; Waterloo, Iowa
- Died: May 4, 2017 (aged 85); Green Valley, Arizona
- Occupation: Architect
- Awards: Fellow, American Institute of Architects (1977); Leon Chatelain Award, Easterseals (1983)

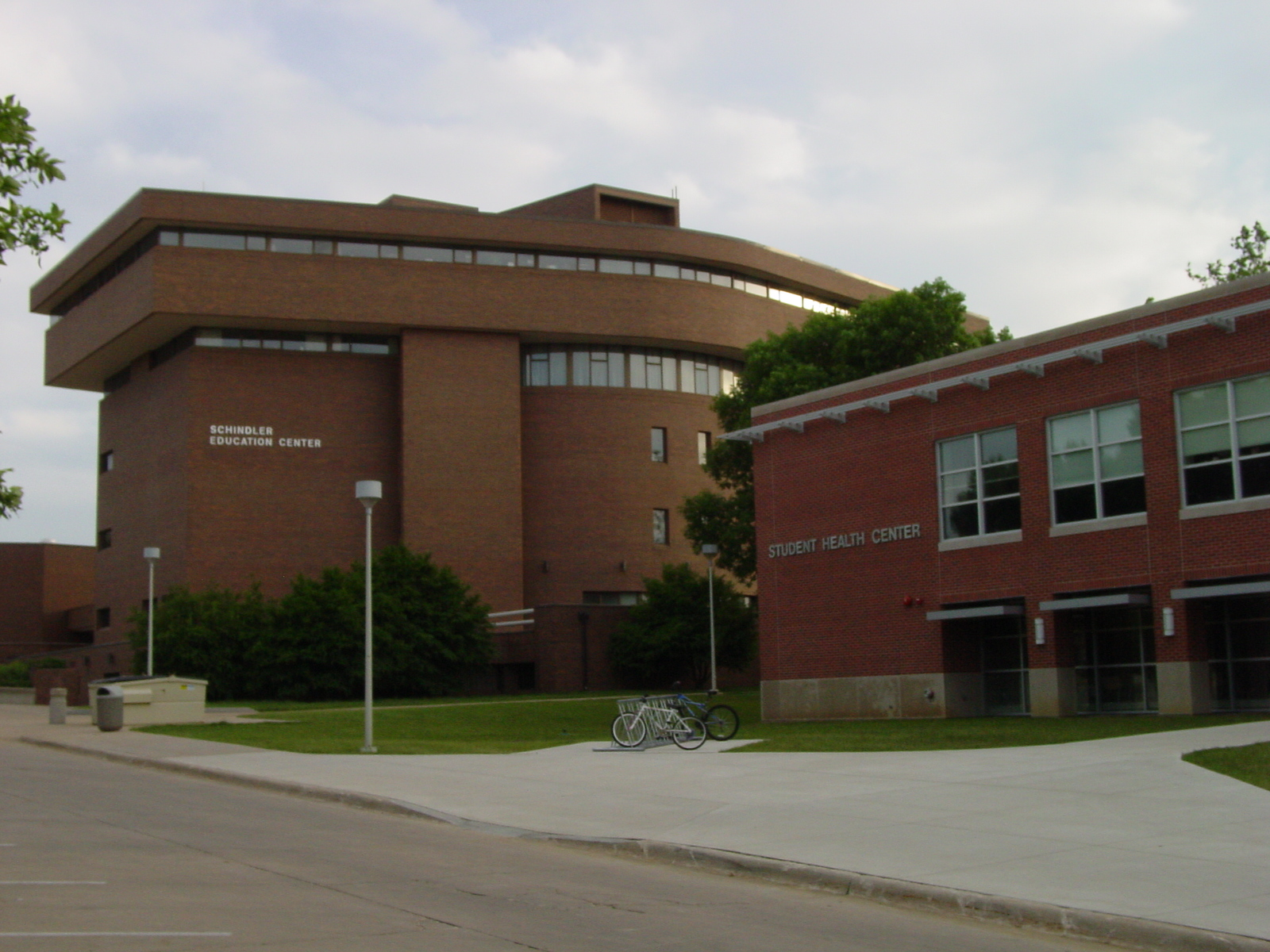
The Schindler Education Center at the University of Northern Iowa, completed in 1972.

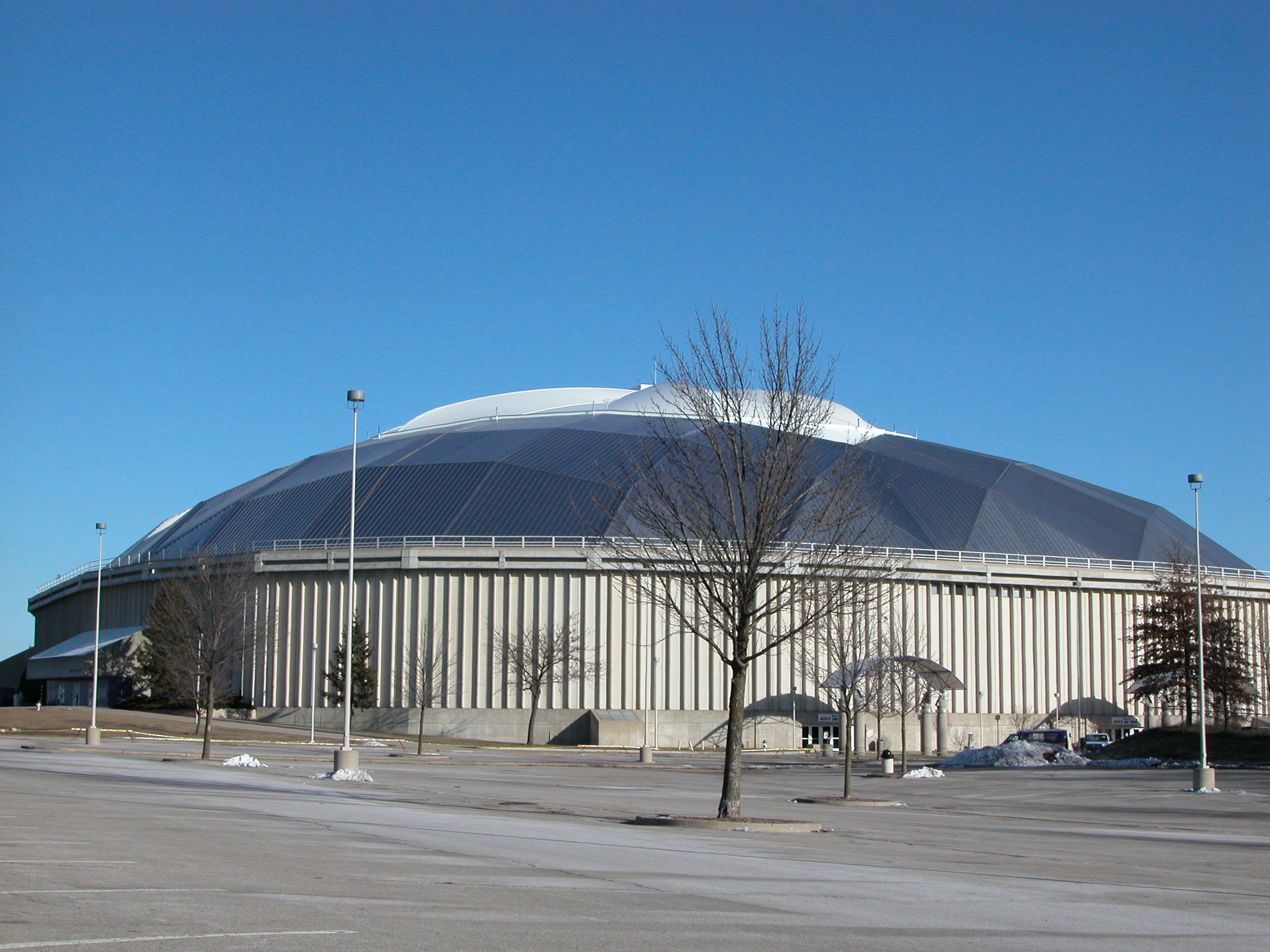
The UNI-Dome at the University of Northern Iowa, completed in 1976.

Robert C. Broshar FAIA (May 20, 1931 – May 4, 2017) was an American architect in practice in Waterloo, Iowa from 1956 to 1996; he served as president of the American Institute of Architects for 1982–1983.

== Life and career ==
Robert Clare Broshar was born May 20, 1931, in Waterloo, Iowa to Clare Broshar and Stella Mae (Scott) Broshar. He attended the Waterloo public schools and Iowa State University, graduating with a BArch in 1954. He then joined architects Thorson, Thorson & Madson in Waterloo. In 1960, he left to open his own office, Henry & Broshar, with Harvey W. Henry, but in 1962 returned to the Thorson firm as a principal, which was then renamed Thorson–Brom–Broshar. It became Thorson–Brom–Broshar–Snyder in 1968. Broshar remained a principal in the firm until his retirement in 1996. In 2001, Thorson–Brom–Broshar–Snyder acquired InVision Architecture of Des Moines and as of 2023 practices under the name INVISION Architecture.

Broshar joined the American Institute of Architects (AIA) in 1960 as a member of the Iowa chapter. He served as chapter president for 1972 and was elected to the AIA board of directors in 1975. He served as vice president in 1979 and 1981, and in the latter year was elected first vice president/president elect for 1982 and president for 1983. As president, Broshar focused on educating the public on the value of architects and emphasized public service. Broshar was elected a fellow of the AIA in 1977 and after his presidency was elected to honorary membership in the Royal Institute of British Architects (RIBA), the Royal Architectural Institute of Canada (RAIC), the Colombian Society of Architects (SCA), the Federation of Colleges of Architects of the Mexican Republic (FCARM), the New Zealand Institute of Architects (NZIA) and the Philippine Institute of Architects (PIA). He was also a member and fellow of the Construction Specifications Institute.

A disability rights advocate, Broshar was chair of the Iowa Barrier-Free Architecture Task Force in 1973–74, the report which contributed to the passage of new legislation in congress to ensure compliance with the Architectural Barriers Act of 1968. He was also a member of the Iowa Governor's Committee on Employment of the Handicapped from 1975 to 1979. For his work, in 1983 he was the recipient of the Leon Chatelain Award of the Easterseals. Named for architect and disability advocate Leon Chatelain Jr., this award was given for "outstanding leadership in advancing barrier-free environments for people with handicaps."

== Personal life ==
Broshar was married in 1953 to Joyce Elaine Lukes. They had five children, four sons and one daughter. In retirement, they lived first in Clear Lake, Iowa and later in Green Valley, Arizona. Broshar died May 4, 2017, in Green Valley at the age of 85.

Broshar's children include Michael Broshar, who also became an architect and was a partner in his father's firm from 1991 until his retirement in 2019. He was elected a fellow of the AIA in 2006.

== Architectural works ==
- Britt United Methodist Church, 707 4th St SW, Britt, Iowa (1965)
- Waterloo Center for the Arts, 225 Commercial St, Waterloo, Iowa (1966)
- Schindler Education Center, University of Northern Iowa, Cedar Falls, Iowa (1972)
- Waterloo Savings Bank Building, 425 Cedar St, Waterloo, Iowa (1973)
- Waterloo Convention Center, 200 W 4th St, Waterloo, Iowa (1975)
- UNI-Dome, University of Northern Iowa, Cedar Falls, Iowa (1976)
- Becker Communications Studies Building, University of Iowa, Iowa City, Iowa (1984)
- Young Arena, 125 Commercial St, Waterloo, Iowa (1994)
- Black Hawk County Jail, 225 E 6th St, Waterloo, Iowa (no date)
