= The White Shoes =

The White Shoes may refer to:

- The White Shoes, earlier name of Dutch band The Shoes
- The White Shoes (song), song by the rap artist Wale on The Album About Nothing

== See also ==
- White Shoes (disambiguation)
