= White & Case =

American law firm

White & Case LLP
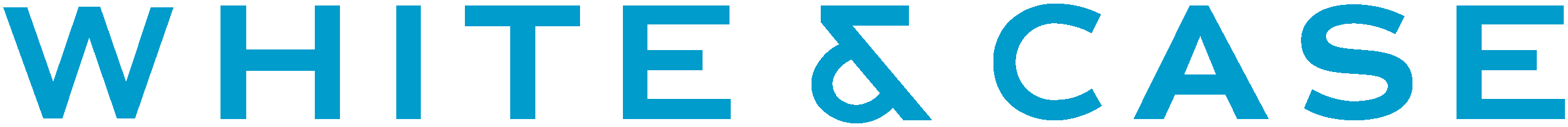
- Headquarters: 1221 Avenue of the Americas; New York City, New York, U.S.
- No. of offices: 46
- No. of attorneys: 2,559 (2024)
- No. of employees: Approx. 4,800 total
- Major practice areas: General Practice
- Key people: Heather McDevitt (Chair)
- Profit per equity partner: $4 million (2025)
- Date founded: 1901; 125 years ago
- Founder: Justin DuPratt White; George B. Case
- Company type: Limited liability partnership
- Website: www.whitecase.com

White & Case LLP is a global white-shoe law firm based in New York City. Founded in 1901, the firm has 46 offices in 31 countries worldwide.

== History ==
The firm was founded on May 1, 1901, when two Wall Street lawyers, Justin DuPratt White, 31, and George B. Case, 28, each contributed $250 (equivalent to $9,675 in 2025) to establish White & Case.

White attended Cornell Law School on a state scholarship, where he was an editor of The Cornell Daily Sun. Case attended Yale University, where he played college baseball for the Yale Bulldogs, and then Columbia Law School.

The pair had a close relationship with Henry P. Davison, a noted banker who helped create the Federal Reserve. The firm's first clients included Bankers Trust Company.

James Hurlock led the firm as chairman from 1980 to 2000. Under Hurlock, the firm tripled its roster of lawyers and expanded into multiple global markets.

In 1994, White & Case was among the first American law firms to open offices in Vietnam. Among the firm’s first clients in the region were PetroVietnam and Vietnamese State Bank.

Duane Wall was named chairman in 2000. Although he refocused its business on New York's financial services industry, Wall also oversaw a merger with the German firm Feddersen Laule Ewerwahn Scherzberg Finkelnburg Clemm. This enabled White & Case to become the first American company to enter the "top ten" firms in Germany.

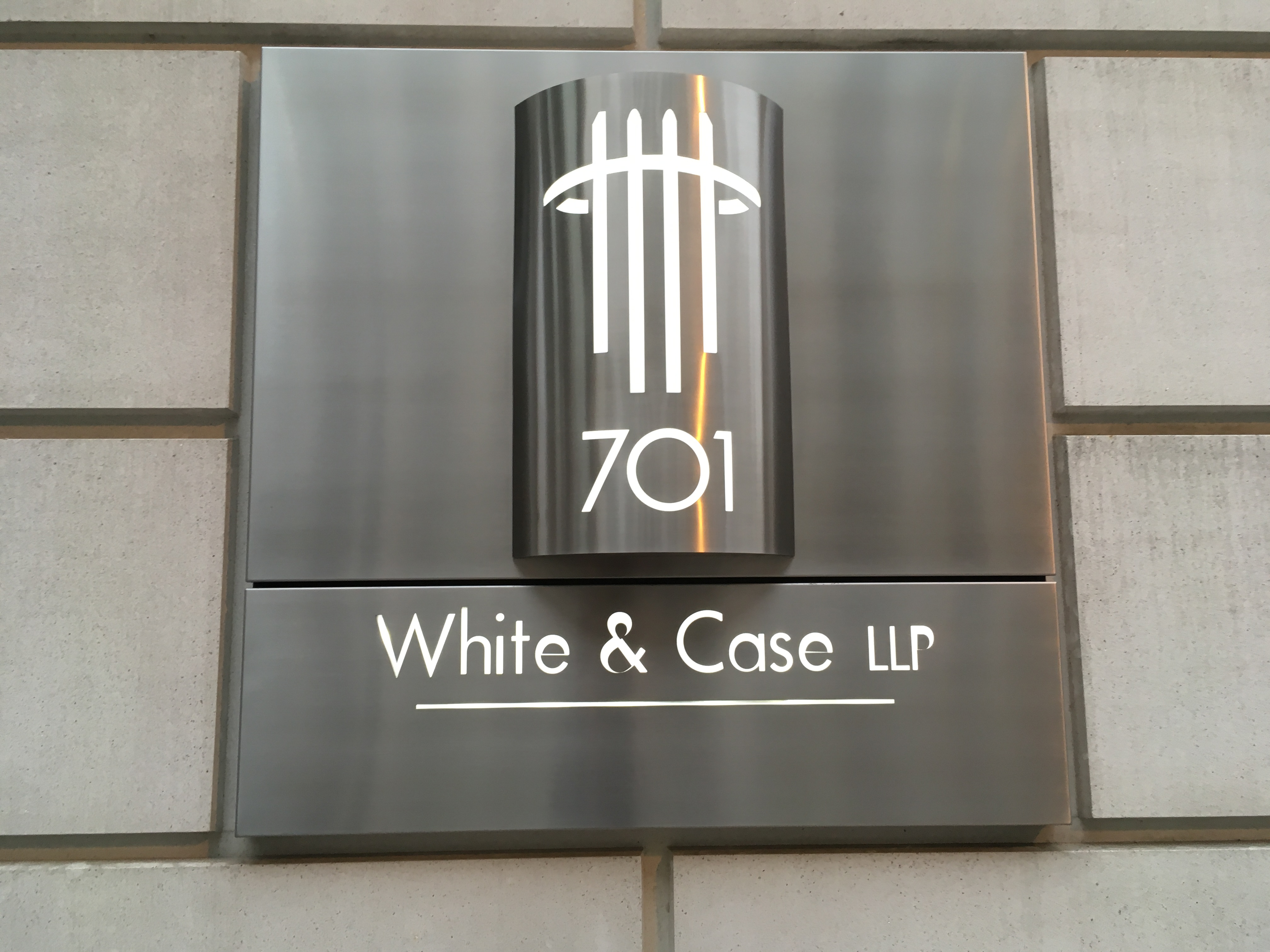
Plaque outside White & Case's Washington, D.C. office

On October 1, 2007, White & Case announced a new leadership team led by chairman Hugh Verrier. Shortly after taking the reins of the firm, Verrier retained the consulting firm of McKinsey & Company to conduct a review of its worldwide business operations.

In 2010, White & Case created a global pro bono practice, focusing on three areas: access to justice, promoting the rule of law, and serving the world’s leading non-governmental organizations. The firm was profiled by Law360 in 2012 for its pro bono efforts.

The firm's antitrust law practice has been recognized as part of the top 5 Global Elite by the Global Competition Review (GCR) in 2020.

The firm also has one of the most successful international arbitration practices in the world, having ranked first every year from 2015 to 2019, and most recently in 2021, by Global Arbitration Review (GAR). White & Case is also noted by GAR as having the largest portfolio valuation of any firm for 2020 to 2022 (20 percent larger than the portfolio at the second-largest firm), and has the highest number of recognized market-leading practitioners. The firm's arbitration practice is consistently ranked in the top bands across all market leading legal rankings, and was most recently recognized in 2024 by Chambers as the top 4 Global Elite.

In June 2020, the firm announced that it had "poached" four Winston & Strawn specialists to establish itself as a destination law firm for special-purpose acquisition companies (SPACs): Joel Rubinstein, Jonathan Rochwarger, Elliott Smith and Daniel Nussen.

In March 2026, a lawsuit was filed in Bronx County Court against the firm by a digital production specialist alleging a workplace culture of misconduct and retaliation after the firm reportedly covered up the dissemination of non-consensual intimate photos taken at a firm event.

== Noriega controversy ==
White & Case registered with the U.S. Government as a foreign agent for the Panamanian government in 1981. At the time, Panama was led by Manuel Noriega, a dictator with connections to international cocaine cartels. The representation became a significant issue for Rudolph Giuliani in his 1989 campaign for New York City Mayor. Giuliani had joined the firm in February of that year and claimed no prior knowledge of the firm’s work for the Panamanian government.

== Pro bono work ==
The firm was part of a program in New York City to provide pro bono legal representation to battered women seeking a divorce from their husbands.

Partner Dana Foster began working to address racial injustice in Louisiana in 2020 by representing 16 mostly Black defendants with criminal convictions issued by non-unanimous, so-called “Jim Crow” juries. Created by segregationist lawmakers in the 1880s to oppress Black Americans, these laws were deemed unconstitutional in 2020 by the U.S. Supreme Court.

== Notable lawyers and alumni ==
- Andy Beshear – Governor of Kentucky
- Steven Beshear – Former Governor of Kentucky
- Ana Birchall – Romanian politician
- Roger Blough – former chairman of U.S. Steel
- Raoul G. Cantero III – Former Florida Supreme Court Justice
- Malik R. Dahlan – International lawyer and law professor
- Tony Garza – American lawyer
- Rudolph Giuliani – former Mayor of New York City and advisor to President Donald Trump
- Richard J. Holwell – former United States district judge of the United States District Court for the Southern District of New York
- Louis Hsieh – Chinese businessman and lawyer, and the chief financial officer (CFO) of Nio, a Chinese developer of electric and autonomous vehicles
- Irving S. Olds – American lawyer
- Stephen M. Schwebel – American judge
- Justin DuPratt White – American lawyer and co-founder of White & Case.
- Lauren Woodland – actress

== See also ==
- List of largest United States–based law firms by profits per partner
- List of largest United States–based law firms by head count
