= John Lyon Collyer =

John Lyon Collyer (18 September 1893 – 24 June 1979) was an American businessman and chairman of the Board of Trustees at Cornell University. He served as chairman, president, and CEO at B. F. Goodrich and won the Medal for Merit in 1946.

Academic offices
Preceded by Neal Dow Becker	Chairman of Cornell Board of Trustees; 1953–1959	Succeeded by Arthur H. Dean
