= Lyndon Baines Johnson Department of Education Building =

Building in Washington, D.C.

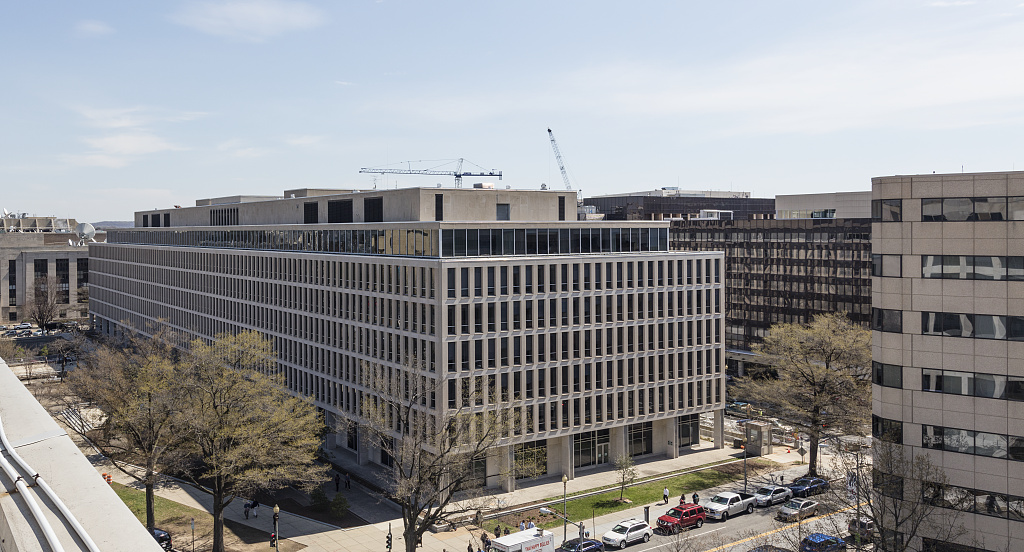
- Interactive map of the Lyndon Baines Johnson Department of Education Building area
- Former names: Federal Office Building 6 (FOB 6)

General information
- Architectural style: Modernist
- Location: 400 Maryland Ave SW, Washington, D.C., United States
- Coordinates: 38.886717°N 77.018787°W
- Current tenants: Department of Education
- Named for: Lyndon B. Johnson
- Construction started: 1959
- Completed: 1961
- Inaugurated: December 7, 1961
- Renovated: 1995–96
- Cost: $14 million (1958 budget)
- Owner: General Services Administration

Technical details
- Material: Concrete
- Size: 643,000 square feet (59,700 m^{2})
- Floor count: 7

Design and construction
- Architects: Faulkner, Kingsbury & Stenhouse; Chatelain, Gauger & Nolan
- Main contractor: McCloskey and Company (Philadelphia)

References
- Application for Historic Landmark

The Lyndon Baines Johnson Department of Education Building is a federal office building in Washington, D.C., which serves as the headquarters of the United States Department of Education.

== History ==
Construction of the building started in 1959 and concluded in 1961; it was originally known as Federal Office Building 6 (FOB 6). The building was initially used by NASA and the then Department of Health, Education, and Welfare (HEW). In 1979, occupancy of the building was given to the newly formed Department of Education. The building also houses the National Library of Education, which was established in 1995.

Ernest L. Boyer, U.S. Commissioner of Education in the late 1970s, sought to have the building renamed—he suggested it be named after Horace Mann—but the name remained Federal Office Building 6. In 2007, the building was renamed in honor of Lyndon B. Johnson, 36th president of the United States.

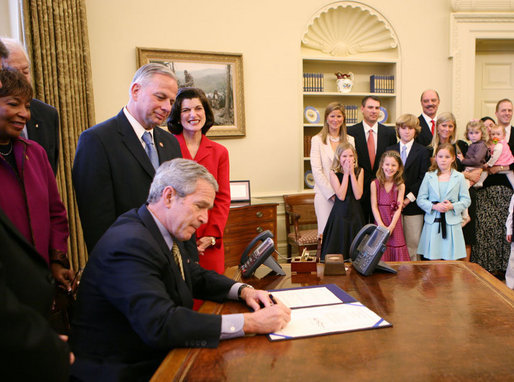
President George W. Bush signing H.R. 584 on March 23, 2007, naming the Lyndon Baines Johnson Department of Education Building

During Donald Trump's second term, the Department of Government Efficiency announced it would shrink the Department of Education's workforce by half, and Trump signed an executive order on March 20 aimed at closing the department to the maximum extent allowed by law. In 2026, it was announced that the Department of Education would move out so the Department of Energy could occupy the building.
