= Washington Gas Building =

General information
- Location: Washington, D.C., United States
- Coordinates: 38°53′58.3″N 77°1′38.2″W
- Completed: 1941

Height
- Roof: 152 feet (46 m)

Technical details
- Floor count: 15

Design and construction
- Architect(s): Jarrett C. White; Leon Chatelain Jr.

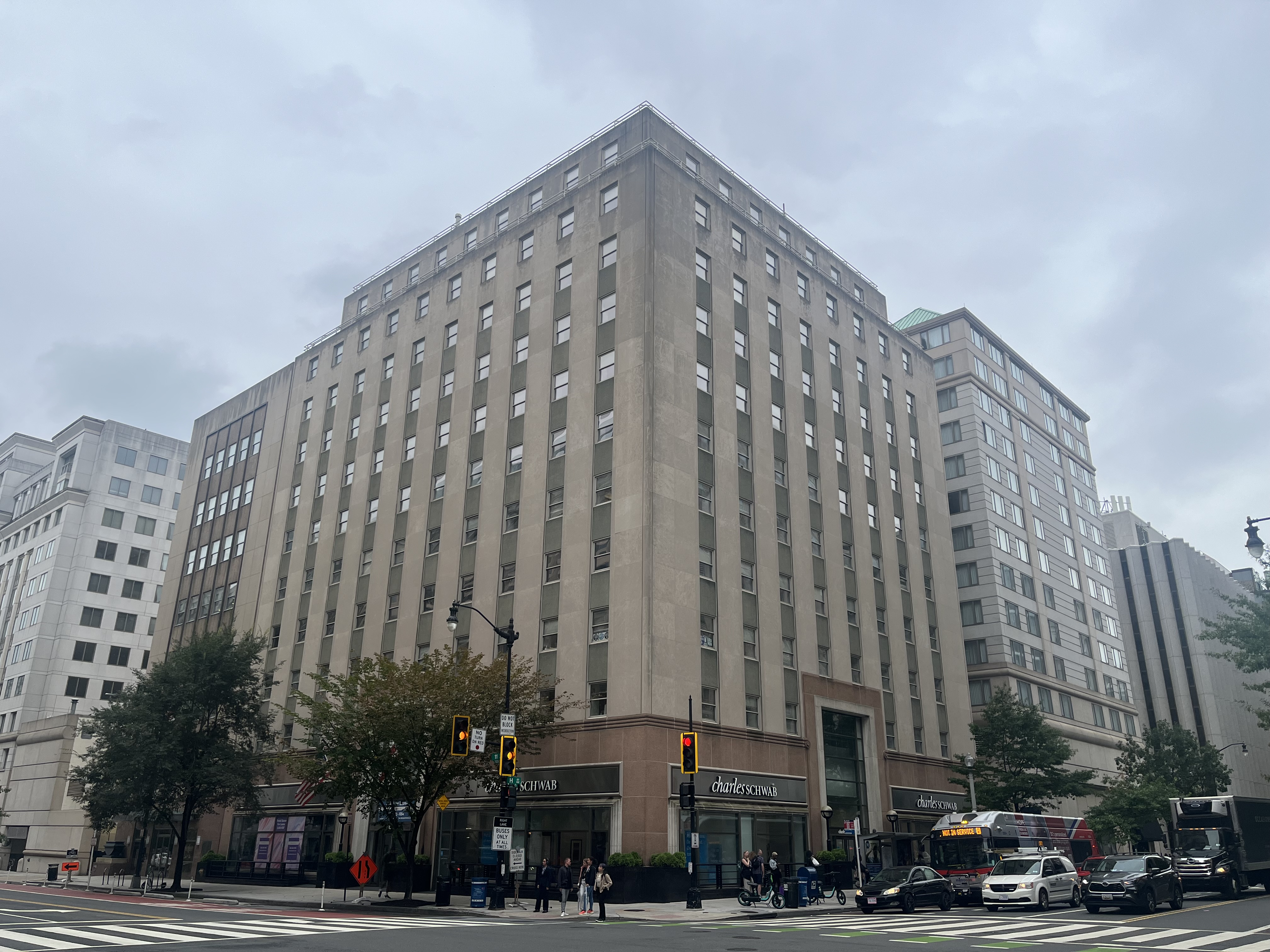

Washington Gas Building is a high-rise building located in the United States capital of Washington, D.C. It rises to 152 feet (46 m) with approximately 15 floors. The building's construction was completed in 1941. The architects of the building were Jarrett C. White and Leon Chatelain Jr.

== See also ==
- List of tallest buildings in Washington, D.C.
