= Howard E. Babcock =

Howard E. Babcock

Howard Edward Babcock (February 23, 1889 – July 12, 1950) was the chairman of Cornell Board of Trustees from 1940 to 1947. He served on the Federal Farm Board as well as on the board of the Central Bank for Cooperatives. He was co-president of the National Cooperative Council and chairman of the American Institute of Cooperation.

== Biography ==
He was born on February 23, 1889. He graduated from Syracuse University and studied agriculture in the Cornell Summer School of 1911. He then taught school and later became a professor of marketing in the Cornell University College of Agriculture and Life Sciences. While he was a professor, the Cooperative Grange League Federation Exchange, a failing farmer's cooperative, requested Babcock's help. Under his management, the cooperative became the largest farmer's cooperative in the world. Upon becoming the president of the New York State Grange, Babcock became an ex officio Cornell Trustee in 1930. He served as chairman of the board from 1940 to 1947. He died on July 12, 1950.

== Legacy ==
He was inducted into the Cooperative Hall of Fame in 1976.

Academic offices
Preceded by J. DuPratt White	Chairman of Cornell Board of Trustees; 1940–1947	Succeeded by Neal Dow Becker
