= American Australian Association =

Organisation based in New York

The American Australian Association (AAA) is a privately funded nonprofit organization based in New York City serving the relationship between Australia and the United States. As well as hosting political and business leaders, providing a forum for collaboration, it funds scholarships for Australian and American students to study in each other's countries. It founded the United States Studies Centre at the University of Sydney and the Perth USAsia Centre at the University of Western Australia

== History ==
Sir Keith Murdoch, the father of Rupert Murdoch, is credited with being the main instigator of the AAA. It was founded in 1948 at a meeting that included co-founders:

- Randal Heymanson, of Australian Newspaper Service Ltd
- Alick McLean, of the Hanover Bank
- Russell Leffingwell, chairman of J.P. Morgan
- Juan Trippe, founder and chairman of Pan American Airways
- James A. Farley, Postmaster General
- Edward Riley, of General Motors Overseas Corporation
- Ogden Reid, publisher of The Republican and the New York Tribune
- Neal Dow Becker
- Herbert Bayard Swope
- Charles Gamble of the Standard Vacuum Oil Co.
- E.C. Dyson of Dyson Kissner Corp.
- Floyd Blair of First National City Bank
- Harry B. Van Sinderen, president of C. Tennant, Sons & Co.
- John M. Young, founding partner of Morgan Stanley & Co.

The inaugural president was Edward E. Robbins.

The association functioned under voluntary leadership with a part-time executive sectretary for many years, receiving significant administrative support from Morgan Stanley & Co. In late 1995 it engaged a full-time executive and established an independent office. In 1996, the AAA merged with The Australia Society, which had been founded in 1989 by the Australian consul-general in New York, Chris Hurford, and others, to promote economic, social, and cultural ties between the two countries. The merger made the organization the largest national not-for-profit in the US devoted to relations between the US, Australia, and New Zealand.

In 2006, the AAA established its Sydney office.

Craig Chapman was chair for six years between 2020 and 2025, and served a total of 23 years on the board. The president until December 2024 was John Berry, who had been Australia's ambassador to the United States between 2012 and 2016.

== Structure and governance ==
The American Australian Association Limited is a privately funded non-profit organization. Its Sydney arm is registered as a charity in Australia, with its stated purpose "advancing education".

Since 1 January 2025 and as of January 2026, former premier of South Australia, Steven Marshall, is president of the AAA.

Andrew Liveris was appointed chair of the association effective 1 January 2026. He is a dual Australian-American citizen, and president of the Brisbane 2032 Olympic and Paralympic Games Organising Committee. He was formerly chair and CEO of the Dow Chemical Company.

== Location and description ==
The head office is situated on the 34th floor of 600 Third Avenue in Manhattan, New York. The premises, designed by Woods Bagot and named American Australian Association Murdoch Centre, opened in March 2025, attended by Rupert and his son Lachlan Murdoch, along with the American ambassador to Australia, Caroline Kennedy, Arthur Sinodinos, and Anthony Pratt. The new building was largely funded by News Corp and Fox Corporation, along with extra support from the Pratt Foundation. A custom artwork was commissioned from the APY Art Centre Collective in Adelaide to hang in the bar area, painted by eight Aboriginal women.

The AAA aims to serve the relationship between Australia and the US, and provides a "forum for collaboration and exchange between political and business leaders". It has hosted the US president, Australian prime ministers as well as other ministers, as well as CEOs of prominent companies in both countries.

== Education ==
With funding from the Australian Government, the AAA established the United States Studies Centre at the University of Sydney and the Perth USAsia Centre at the University of Western Australia.

The AAA provides scholarship awards of up to US$40,000 for American or Australian students wishing to study for a Masters or PhD degree, or do postdoctoral research in each other's countries.

American aerospace and defense company Northrop Grumman began funding an annual scholarship for Australian students in 2020, and in 2025 announced a boost of US$60,000 to its funding for scholarships.
