= Arthur Dean (lawyer) =

American diplomat

Arthur Hobson Dean
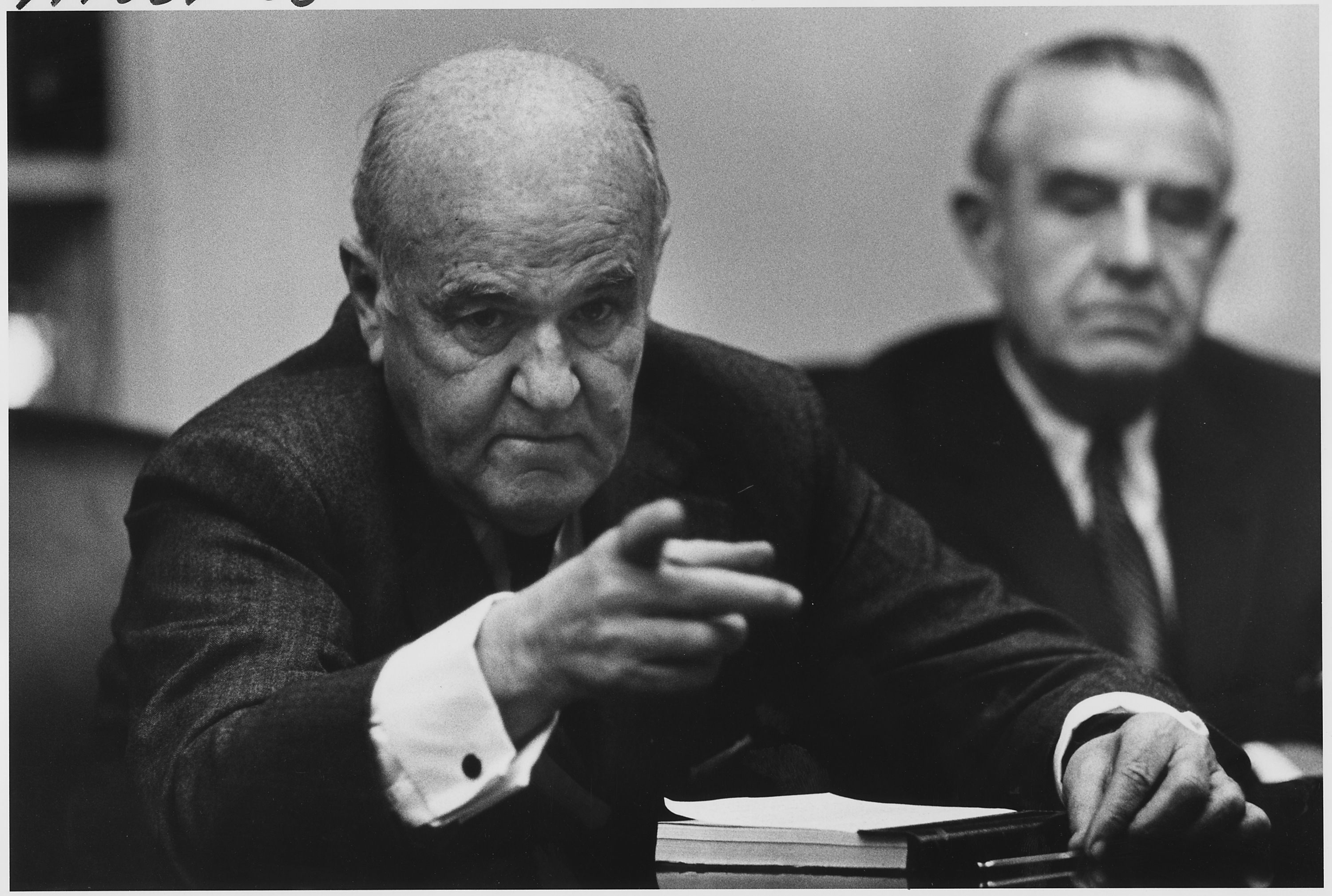
- Dean in 1966
- Born: October 16, 1898; Ithaca, New York, U.S.
- Died: November 30, 1987 (aged 89)
- Education: Cornell University
- Occupations: Lawyer, diplomat
- Employer: Sullivan & Cromwell
- Known for: Negotiator of the Korean Armistice Agreement and Nuclear Test Ban Treaty
- Board member of: Council on Foreign Relations, Asia Society, Bilderberg Group steering committee

Arthur Hobson Dean (October 16, 1898 – November 30, 1987) was a New York City lawyer and diplomat who was viewed as one of the leading corporate lawyers of his day, as well having served as a key advisor to numerous U.S. presidents.

== Early life ==
Dean was a native of Ithaca, New York, and attended Ithaca High School and then Cornell University. After serving in the U.S. Navy during World War I, he received both a bachelor's and LL.B. degree from Cornell, in 1921 and 1923, respectively, and was the managing editor of the Cornell Law Quarterly.

== Career ==
Dean was chairman and senior partner of Sullivan & Cromwell, where he worked closely with John Foster Dulles. He was the chief U.S. negotiator at Panmunjeom where he helped negotiate the Korean Armistice Agreement, which ended the Korean War, and helped draft and negotiate the Nuclear Test Ban Treaty in 1963.

Dean was a member and later served on the board of directors of the Council on Foreign Relations, the Asia Society, and served as a delegate to the United Nations. He was a member of the steering committee of the Bilderberg Group and participated in 14 conferences between 1957 and 1975.

== Legacy ==
Dean's official papers are maintained at Cornell University Library, of which he was a major patron.

Academic offices
Preceded by John Lyon Collyer	Chairman of Cornell Board of Trustees; 1959–1968	Succeeded by Robert W. Purcell
