= Austin H. Kiplinger =

American journalist

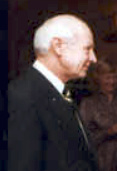
Austin H. Kiplinger, 1981

Austin H. Kiplinger (19 September 1918 – 20 November 2015) was an American journalist and businessman. He was the son of W. M. Kiplinger and Irene Austin. His father was the founder of Kiplinger Washington Editors, publishers of The Kiplinger Letters and Kiplinger's Personal Finance Magazine. From 1961 to 1992, Kiplinger helmed the Kiplinger Company before passing the position to his son, Knight Kiplinger.

== Early and personal life ==
The son of W. M. Kiplinger, Kiplinger was born in Washington, D.C. in 1918. He grew up there, attending Western High School. While attending Cornell University, he worked as the Cornell campus stringer for the Ithaca Journal and wrote stories about the 1936 Presidential Election that were picked up by the Associated Press. He was a member of the Cornell University Glee Club, Quill and Dagger, and Phi Beta Kappa, graduating in 1939. Thereafter, he attended Harvard University, studying economics.

In December 1944, he married Mary Louise "Gogo" Cobb of Winnetka, Ill. The couple shared two sons. Mary Louise died in 2007 and he died on 20 November 2015 in Rockville aged 97.

== Career ==
Kiplinger embarked on journalism full-time in 1940 with the San Francisco Chronicle. He assisted his father with writing the 1942 book Washington is Like That. Following a stint in the United States Navy during World War II, he helped his father found the publication now known as Kiplinger's Personal Finance, first published in 1947, before relocating to Chicago in 1948 to work as a columnist for the Chicago Journal of Commerce and political newscaster for networks ABC and NBC.

In 1956, he returned to Kiplinger Washington Editors. In 1961, he succeeded his father as editor-in-chief of the Kiplinger Letters and Changing Times. The magazine, today edited by his son Knight (who is president and chairman of KWE), is the longest continually published personal finance publication in the United States. His older son, Todd (1945-2008), was vice chair of the KWE board.

In addition to his journalism career, Kiplinger followed his father’s lead as a collector of Washingtoniana—historical prints and photographs depicting the history of Washington, D.C. He championed the creation of a city museum for the District of Columbia. The research library at the Historical Society of Washington, D.C. in Mount Vernon Square is named in his honor. In 2011 the 5000-piece Kiplinger Washington Collection was pledged to several Washington area museums, with most of it (4,000 graphic works) going to the Historical Society and other portions going to Mount Vernon, the National Portrait Gallery and President Lincoln's Cottage at Soldiers Home.

Kiplinger is chairman emeritus of the Cornell University Board of Trustees and a trustee or past trustee of the Tudor Place Foundation, the National Symphony Orchestra, the National Press Foundation, Washington International Horse Show and Federal City Council, among other civic commitments.

In 1958 Kiplinger and his wife restored Montevideo, an 1830 home in Seneca, Maryland, and the centerpiece today of a 400-acre working farm near the Potomac River. Long active in farmland preservation, he was the first Montgomery County, Maryland, landowner, in 1989, to put most of his land into a new county easement program, under which development rights were sold to the county and property taxes reduced. The historic house and 25 acres are owned today by his son Knight, while Austin retained ownership of most of the farmland.

== Awards and honors ==
In 1997 the U.S. Navy Memorial Foundation awarded Kiplinger its Lone Sailor Award for his naval service. As of 2004, he held six honorary degrees.

Academic offices
Preceded by Jansen Noyes, Jr.	Chairman of Cornell Board of Trustees; 1984–1989	Succeeded by Stephen H. Weiss
