= Berkery, Noyes & Co =

Berkery, Noyes & Co., LLC
- Company type: Private
- Industry: Investment Banking
- Founded: 1983
- Founder: Joseph W. Berkery
- Headquarters: One Liberty Plaza; New York City, NY; United States
- Key people: Joseph W. Berkery; John T. Shea
- Website: www.berkerynoyes.com

Berkery, Noyes & Co., LLC is a private middle-market investment bank based in New York City, United States, specializing in mergers and acquisitions advisory and financial consulting services.

== History ==
In 1980, Joseph W. Berkery founded Berkery Associates, whose activities centered exclusively on mergers and acquisitions advisory. That same year, Jansen Noyes Jr. helped found the investment banking firm Noyes Partners, Inc. (remaining as its president until 2003). In 1983, Berkery merged his company with that of Noyes, creating the present incarnation of Berkery, Noyes & Co., a division within Noyes Partners. Noyes was a founding partner of Noyes Partners in 1980 and remained as its president until 2003.

== Overview ==
Berkery Noyes works on behalf of companies in the global information, software, marketing services and technology industries. The firm also concentrates on mergers and acquisitions advisory in vertical industries such as healthcare, financial technology and education.

Berkery Noyes helped facilitate the growth of companies in the information industry, such as Reed Elsevier, McGraw-Hill, and The Thomson Corporation (now Thomson Reuters). As of 2012, a large percentage of the firm's clients have software and online components.

Berkery Noyes issues trend reports each quarter, which have been referenced in US business media outlets such as Forbes and The Wall Street Journal. The firm manages MandAsoft.com, an online mergers and acquisitions database.

== Management ==
- Joseph W. Berkery, Chief Executive Officer and President
- John T. Shea, Chief Operating Officer and Managing Partner
