= Neal Dow Becker =

American lawyer and diplomat (1883–1955)

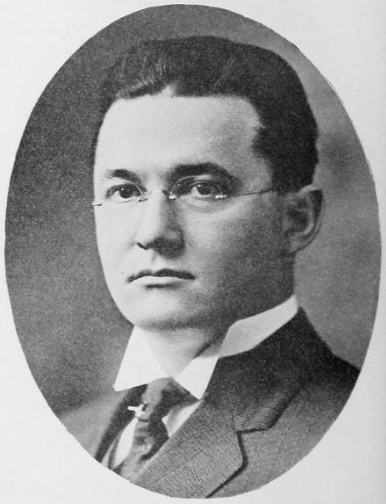
- Born: February 13, 1883; Cherry Creek, New York, US
- Died: May 16, 1955 (aged 72); New York, New York, US
- Education: Cornell University
- Occupations: Manufacturer, lawyer
- Spouses: Iva E. Smith (m. 1909, died) Charlotte Allen (m. 1954)

Neal Dow Becker (February 13, 1883 – May 16, 1955) was an American manufacturer, attorney, and honorary consul general of Bulgaria in the United States.

== Biography ==
Becker was born in Cherry Creek, New York on February 13, 1883. He graduated from Cornell University in 1905. While at Cornell, he was a member of the Glee Club and the Debate Team. He was also elected into the Sphinx Head Society at Cornell.

Becker then practiced law in New York City.

He served as honorary consul general of Bulgaria in the United States from 1923 to 1933.

Becker served as a trustee of Cornell University and was chairman of the Board from 1947 to 1953. He was a member of the Council on Foreign Relations, and he was a founding member of the American Australian Association in 1948, initiated by Keith Murdoch.

He married Iva E. Smith in 1909. After her death, he married Charlotte Allen in 1954.

Becker died from a heart attack at his home in Manhattan on May 16, 1955.

Academic offices
Preceded by Howard Edward Babcock	Chairman of Cornell Board of Trustees; 1947–1953	Succeeded by John Lyon Collyer
