= Jansen Noyes Jr. =

American banker (1918–2004)

Jansen Noyes Jr. (1918–2004) was an investment banker and stock brokerage company executive.

== Education and career ==
Noyes earned a mechanical engineering degree from Cornell University in 1939. During his senior year, Noyes was elected to the Sphinx Head Society. He was chairman of the Board of Trustees of Cornell University from 1978 to 1984.

Noyes was a founding partner of Noyes Partners, Inc. in 1980, and remained as its president until 2003. In 1983, Berkery Associates was merged with Noyes Partners, to create the investment banking firm Berkery, Noyes & Co.

== Personal life ==
Noyes was the son of Jansen Noyes Sr. who founded and was senior partner in the Hornblower, Weeks, Noyes & Trask investment firm of Wall St.

== Charitable work ==
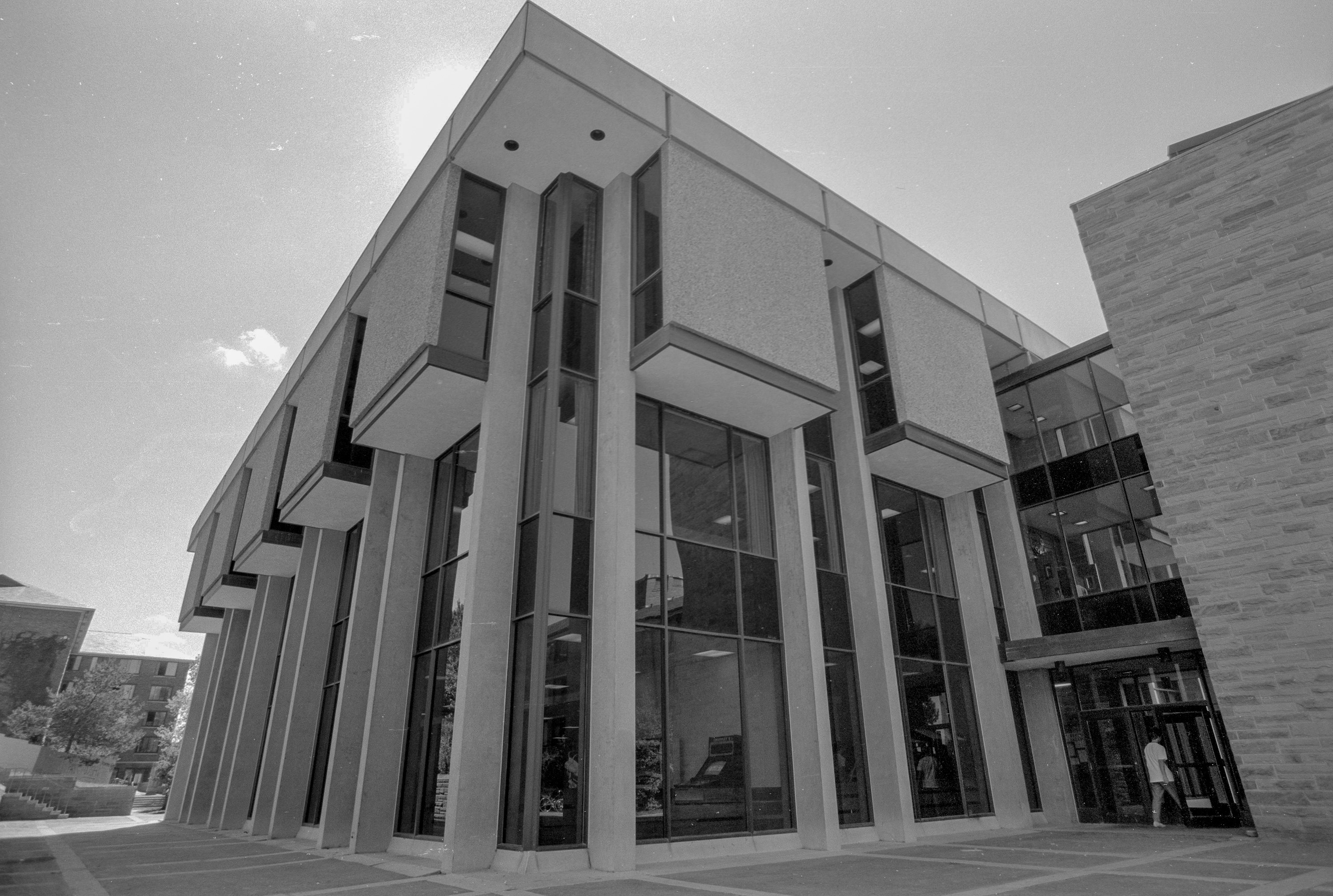
The original Noyes Center, photo c. 1987

In 1966, Noyes' family donated Noyes Center, a student union on Cornell University's West Campus. The building was designed by the architecture firm Todd & Giroux. The building was demolished along with the six University Hall dormitories as part of the West Campus Initiative whose goal was to create a residential college system on West Campus. The building was replaced by the new Noyes Community Recreational Center that opened in 2007 on a nearby site.

He was also the director of Helen Keller International from 1946 to 1996.

Academic offices
| Preceded by Robert W. Purcell | Chairman of Cornell Board of Trustees; 1978–1984 | Succeeded by Austin H. Kiplinger |
