= Robert Purcell =

American businessman and philanthropist

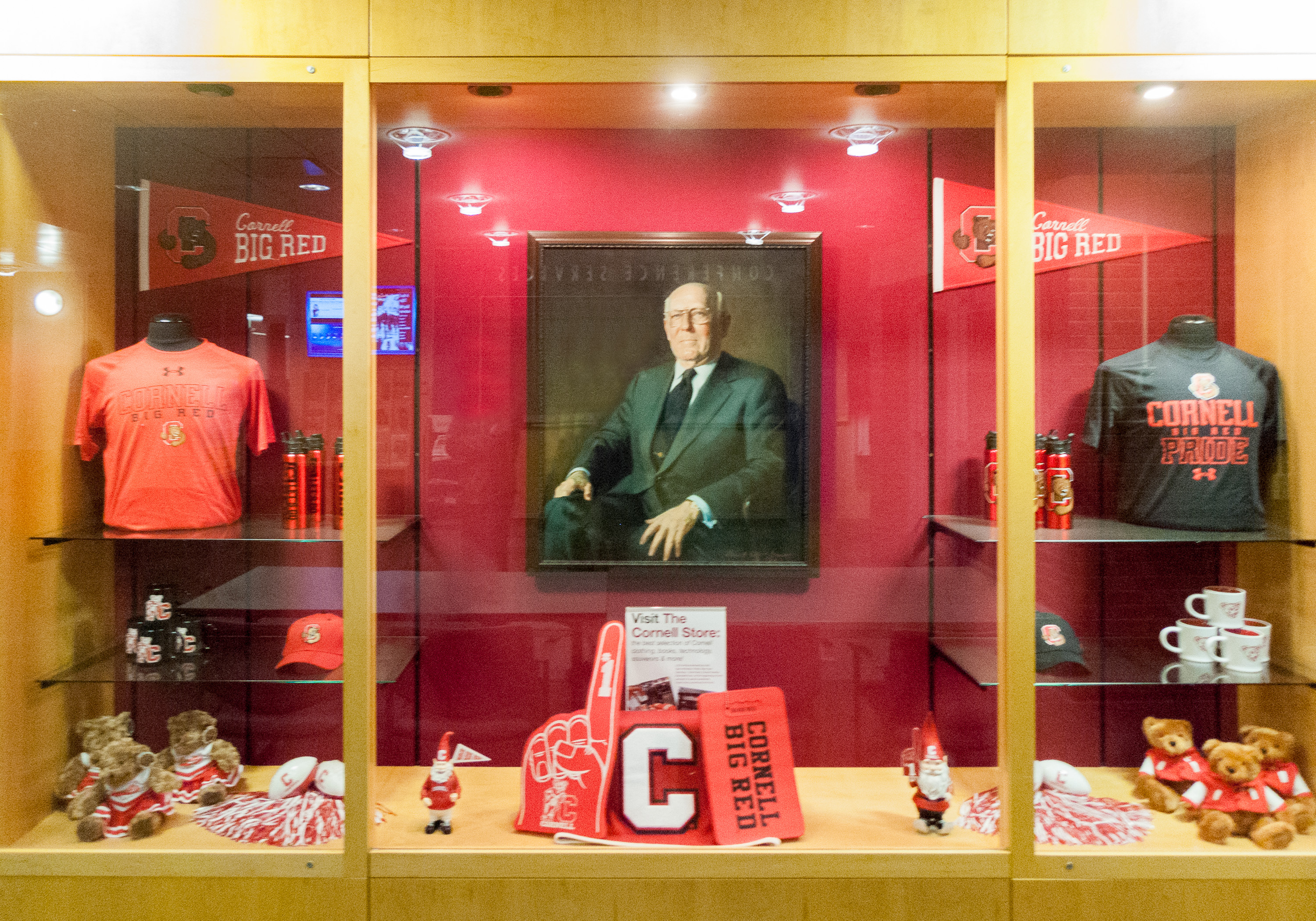
A portrait of Purcell is the centerpiece of this display in the Robert Purcell Community Center

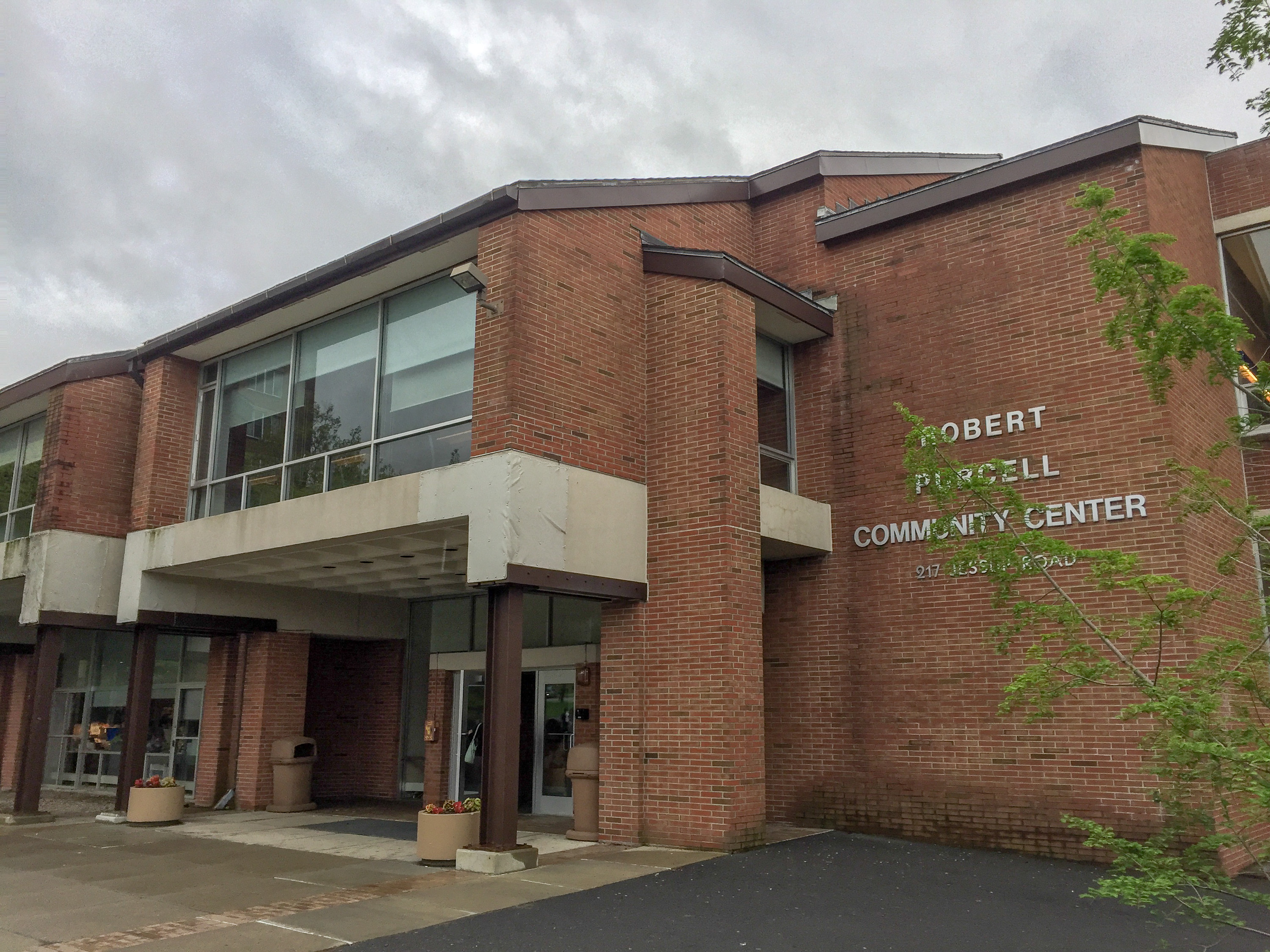
Robert Purcell Community Center, Cornell University North Campus

Robert W. Purcell (1912–1991) was an American businessman and philanthropist, having been financial advisor to the Rockefeller Family from 1955 to 1979 and chairman of the board of trustees of Cornell University from 1968 to 1978. During his tenure as chair, two different presidents, James A. Perkins and Dale Corson, resigned. However, his tenure as Chair also marked expanded minority enrollment, the founding of the Africana Studies and Research Center, and adding five student members to the Board of Trustees. Purcell was also on a number of corporate boards and had a role in Bendix Corporation's 1982 attempt to acquire Martin Marietta.

== Early life ==
Purcell was born in Watertown, New York in 1912. He graduated from Cornell University in 1932, being elected during his last year into the Sphinx Head Society. Purcell then graduated from the Cornell Law School in 1935.

The North Campus student union at Cornell, built in 1971, was named for Purcell in 1982.

Academic offices
Preceded by Arthur H. Dean	Chairman of Cornell Board of Trustees; 1968–1978	Succeeded by Jansen Noyes, Jr.
