= Murder of Christie Lynn Mullins =

1975 child murder in Columbus, Ohio, United States

- Location: Columbus, Ohio, U.S.
- Date: August 23, 1975; 51 years ago
- Attack type: Kidnapping, rape, murder
- Weapon: 2x4 wooden plank
- Victims: Christie Lynn Mullins, aged 14
- Perpetrator: Henry H. Newell Jr
- Motive: unknown
- Accused: Jack Allen Carmen

Christie Lynn Mullins (August 28, 1960 – August 23, 1975) was a 14-year-old girl who was abducted, sexually assaulted, and brutally murdered on August 23, 1975, behind the Graceland shopping center in Columbus, Ohio. Her cause of death was determined to be blunt force trauma to the head.

== Background ==
Mullins was born on August 28, 1960, in Columbus, Ohio. She was scheduled to begin her sophomore year at Whetstone High School shortly after her murder.

== Investigation ==
Three days after the murder, police arrested 25-year-old Jack Allen Carmen, who closely matched a composite sketch of the perpetrator. Carmen, who had an IQ of 50 and was later determined to be intellectually disabled, confessed to the crime after a prolonged police interrogation. He was convicted of Mullins' murder and sentenced, but later claimed his confession was false and given under coercive circumstances. Carmen was retried and acquitted in 1977 and publicly exonerated by the Columbus police department in November 2015.

Decades after the 1975 murder, the case was reopened following a tip from Pam Brown, the niece of Henry H. Newell Jr.—a man who had claimed to be a witness at the scene. Brown claimed that Newell had privately confessed to the murder, and further investigation revealed inconsistencies in his original statement. Newell, who died of lung cancer in 2013, had a history of violent and sexually deviant behavior towards minors, including two prior arrests. Despite Newell's criminal history, he was not thoroughly investigated at the time of Mullins' death.

The case was reopened in part due to the efforts of author and attorney John Oller, whose 2014 book An All-American Murder examined the details of the investigation and brought renewed attention to the case. In November 2015, Columbus police formally closed the case, naming Henry Newell as the perpetrator and issuing a public apology for the wrongful original conviction of Jack Carmen.

=== Statements ===
The witness Henry H. Newell Jr. claimed that he was walking with his wife, stepson, and stepdaughter in the woods behind the mall, when he and his family saw a man beating a young girl with a 2x4 wooden plank. The man saw the family walking and quickly fled the scene. Newell gave a description of the unidentified man, listing him as a tall white male in his late teens. He reportedly had a scrawny thin build with long hair and a scruffy face, was shirtless, and was wearing cut-off shorts. When the police arrived, they found the girl Newell had mentioned, later to be identified as Christie, lying dead with her hands tied in front of her. She was unidentifiable due to the severity of the wounds on her face and head. Her tank top was pulled down to her waist, and she was barefoot.

Christie's classmate Carol stated that earlier that day Christie and her were at the pool in her housing complex. She got a phone call from a radio DJ saying that there would be a cheerleading competition behind the shopping center. Christie agreed to go to the event. However, when they arrived at the back of the shopping center, there was no one there. Carol claimed to have gone inside the mall and asked about the competition but found nobody who knew of the event. Carol then reported she went back to where Christie had been sitting. Christie was no longer there when Carol arrived, so she went home thinking Christie did the same.

Later when Christie's mother, Phyllis Mullins, was questioned by authorities, detectives asked about her daughter's interests/hobbies, specifically cheerleading or gymnastics. Her mother was confused because her daughter had little to no interest in those types of hobbies. When she was asked about her daughter's "friend" Carol, she was yet again confused because Carol did not know Christie well, only knowing each other as classmates.

=== Key information ===
There were many key parts of the murder that were overlooked with the original investigation, such as the similarity of the description of the clothes that the man and Newell were wearing- Newell and the unidentified man were both shirtless and had cut-off shorts on.

In the initial investigation when Newell was questioned about his shirt, Newell claimed that when the man ran off, he and his wife checked on the girl to see if she was still alive. When they found no pulse, Newell took his shirt off and placed it over the victim's face.The shirt was never found. Newell also claimed that when the man ran off and, out of rage, picked up the plank and threw it 20–25 ft. in the direction that the man ran in. Though it lined up with the physical evidence, multiple people had their doubts about the claim.

The "radio DJ" who reportedly told Christie and Carol of the non-existent cheerleading event was not even considered a factor by the original investigation.

=== Wrongful arrest ===
The first arrest was made three days after the murder, when a patrol officer pulled over a man named Jack Allen Carmen, who had a striking resemblance to the composite sketch. After hours of questioning he confessed to the murder. He was later tried and pleaded guilty on September 3, 1975.

In an interview, Jack Carmen later confessed to lying about committing the murder, saying that he only confessed because the police were being nice to him. He was then reassessed and given an IQ test. When the results were back, it was determined that Jack had an IQ of 50 and was deemed mentally disabled. Carmen was re-trialed with the new information and was acquitted of the crime and subsequently released.

=== Primary suspect ===
In the beginning of the case, there were not many suspects other than the man that Newell had claimed he saw. Since the mystery man was unidentified, it was hard to determine where and who he was. Numerous but inauthentic tips came in until Carmen's arrest 3 days after the murder, which occurred due to his likeness to Newell's description.

Newell, who testified against Carmen at trial, was in jail at the time, having been convicted a couple months earlier of arson in setting his own house on fire in an attempt to redeem insurance money for the home. Newell had a criminal past for 2 similar crimes. However, despite substantial evidence at the time connecting him to Christie's murder, Newell escaped prosecution for the murder.

==== Pam Brown's Testimonial ====
Shortly after Newell's death, his niece, Pam Brown, came forward to author and investigator John Oller, claiming her uncle Henry, age 25 at the time of the murder, had confessed to her many years ago that he was the killer. Newell died at age 63 due to lung cancer in 2013. Brown had reportedly stayed quiet about the information due to fear for her and her family's safety. This report led to a reopening of the case by the Columbus police department, who ultimately affirmed Newell's criminality in the case.
