= John Oller =

American biographer, historian, and former Wall Street attorney

- Born: March 3, 1956; Huron, Ohio, U.S.
- Education: Ohio State University (BA); Georgetown University (JD)
- Occupations: Author; attorney (retired)
- Writing career
- Language: English
- Genres: History; Biography
- Notable works: White Shoe (2019); The Swamp Fox (2016)
- Website: www.johnollernyc.com/books

John Oller is an American biographer, historian, and former Wall Street attorney.

== Early life and education ==
Oller was born in Huron, Ohio. He earned a B.A. in journalism, graduating summa cum laude from Ohio State University in 1979, where he wrote for and edited the daily student newspaper, the Lantern, and interned as a reporter at The Plain Dealer in Cleveland and the Rochester Times-Union. Oller graduated magna cum laude from Georgetown University Law Center in 1982.

== Career ==
After graduating from law school, Oller became a litigation associate and later a partner at white-shoe law firm Willkie Farr & Gallagher in New York City, where he represented Major League Baseball, including in the George Brett Pine Tar Incident as well as the Pete Rose sports betting case, as described in the Dowd Report. As a partner of the firm, he went on to specialize in complex commercial and securities litigation, and was a principal author of the Audit Committee Report for Cendant Corporation (at the time, the most massive fraud in American corporate history). The New York Times called the report a definitive case study in the area of accounting irregularities and fraud. In 2004, he authored a history of the Willkie firm. Oller retired from legal practice in 2011 to focus on writing.

== Works ==
=== Jean Arthur: The Actress Nobody Knew (1997) ===
Jean Arthur: The Actress Nobody Knew is a biography of American actress Jean Arthur.

=== One Firm – A Short History of Willkie Farr & Gallagher, 1888 – (2004) ===
One Firm – A Short History of Willkie Farr & Gallagher, 1888 – is a history of the firm at which Oller was a law partner.

=== An All-American Murder (2014) ===
An All-American Murder is about the 1975 murder of 14-year-old Christie Lynn Mullins in Columbus, Ohio, a case that went unsolved for 40 years. Oller, a student at Ohio State University in Columbus when the murder occurred, began investigating the case in 2013. He had just finished writing American Queen, and stumbled into the cold case on a website for amateur unsolved-homicide sleuths as he was looking for a new writing project. In 2015 the Columbus police department credited Oller with tracking down the information that solved the case; after a renewed investigation, the police concluded that Mullins was murdered by Henry Newell Jr., who had died of cancer in September 2013, at age 63. The book has formed the basis for several documentaries and true crime podcasts.

=== American Queen (2014) ===
American Queen: The Rise and Fall of Kate Chase Sprague: Civil War "Belle of the North" and Gilded Age Woman of Scandal is a biography of Washington political hostess Kate Chase.

=== The Swamp Fox (2016) ===
The Swamp Fox: How Francis Marion Saved the American Revolution is a biography of American guerrilla warrior Francis Marion.

=== White Shoe (2019) ===
White Shoe: How a New Breed of Wall Street Lawyers Changed Big Business and the American Century is a history of the American white-shoe firm.

=== Rogues' Gallery (2021) ===
Rogues' Gallery: The Birth of Modern Policing and Organized Crime in Gilded Age New York is a history of crime and policing in New York City from approximately 1870 to 1910.

=== Gangster Hunters (2024) ===
Gangster Hunters: How Hoover's G-Men Vanquished America's Deadliest Public Enemies is the story of the early FBI agents who brought down John Dillinger, Bonnie & Clyde and other 1930s criminals.

== Personal life ==
A golfer, Oller won Willkie Farr & Gallagher's annual golf tournament in Florida four times (a record).
