= National Library of Education (United States) =

U.S. national library

Coordinates: 38.886494°N 77.018796°W

The National Library of Education
- Abbreviation: NLE
- Purpose: Library focused on education
- Headquarters: Lyndon Baines Johnson Building
- Members: depository library under the Federal Depository Library Program
- Owner: United States Department of Education
- Website: ies.ed.gov/use-work/national-library-education-nle

The National Library of Education is a library in the United States serving as a primary resource center for education information. The library provides collections and information services to the public, as well as to the education community and other government agencies on current and historical education programs, activities and publications of the U.S. Department of Education. The library was established in 1995.

== Collections ==
The Library's current collection, in print and electronic formats, focuses on education and includes subject matter such as economics, law, psychology, and sociology, as they relate to education.

The Library maintains an historical collection including some 16,000 government reports on education dating back to 1870, education journals and monographs, and some 16,000 classroom textbooks on a variety of subjects.

== Location ==
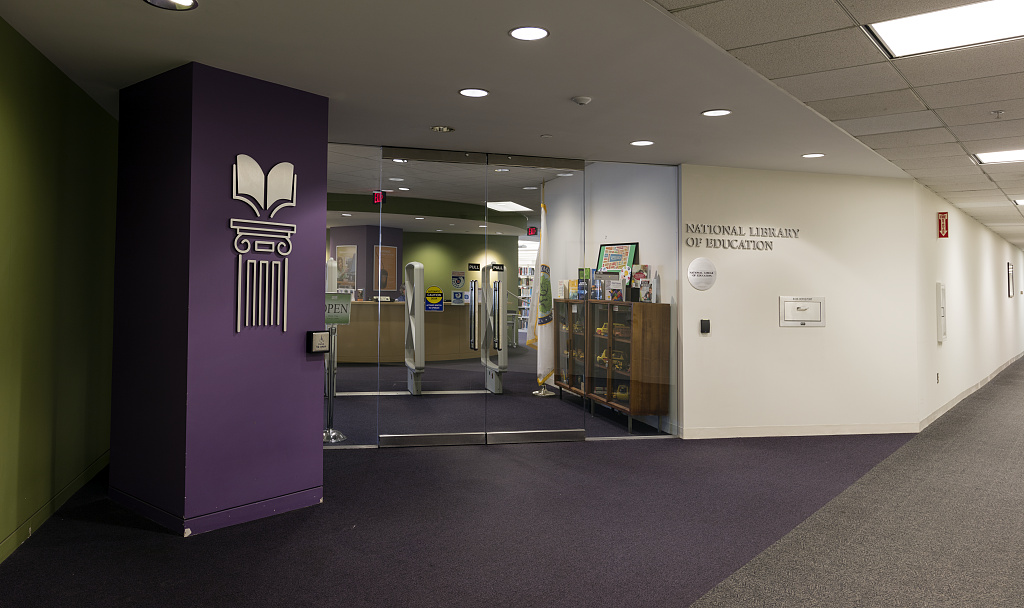
Entrance to the library in the Department of Education Building

The library is located inside the Lyndon Baines Johnson Department of Education Building, which serves as the headquarters of the Department of Education, at 400 Maryland Avenue SW, Washington, D.C., 20202.

== See also ==
- Educational attainment in the United States
- Education in the United States
- National Technical Reports Library
- Secretary of Education
- United States Department of Education
- Department of Education
