= Perth USAsia Centre =

Australian think tank

The Perth USAsia Centre is a think tank located at the University of Western Australia. The centre focuses on international relations between Australia, the Indo-Pacific region and the United States.

== History ==
Launched by Former US Secretary of State, Hillary Clinton in November 2012, the Centre developed out of the successes at the United States Studies Centre at the University of Sydney, developing a think tank presence in Western Australia. The centre hosts a number of events throughout the year including round-table dialogues and major conferences. In 2019 the Centre hosted US ambassador to Australia Arthur B. Culvahouse Jr. The Centre has also been notable in its contributions towards the G'day USA program based in Washington DC, as well as its involvement in various international dialogues around the globe.

== Fellows ==
The centre has a number of high-profile fellows including former Indonesian President Susilo Bambang Yudhoyono, Governor of Western Australia and former Australian Ambassador to the U.S., Kim Beazley, and former Minister for Defence, Stephen Smith.

== Funding ==
The Perth USAsia Centre is an Australian public company limited by guarantee and is a registered charity with the Australian Charities and Not-for-profits Commission. It receives funding from a combination of sources including the private sector, member contributions and the Western Australian State Government. The centre also receives funding for a number of its programs.
