= Architectural Barriers Act of 1968 =

1968 act of congress

- Acronyms (colloquial): ABA
- Enacted by: the 90th United States Congress
- Effective: August 12, 1968

Citations
- Public law: Pub. L. 90–480
- Statutes at Large: 82 Stat. 718

Codification
- U.S.C. sections created: 42 U.S.C. § 4151

Legislative history
- Signed into law by President Lyndon B. Johnson on August 12, 1968

The Architectural Barriers Act of 1968 (ABA, Pub. L. 90–480, 82 Stat. 718, enacted August 12, 1968, codified at 42 U.S.C. § 4151 et seq.) is an Act of Congress, enacted by President Lyndon B. Johnson.

The ABA requires that facilities designed, built, altered, or leased with funds supplied by the United States Federal Government be accessible to the public. For example, it mandates provision of disabled-access toilet facilities in such buildings. The ABA marks one of the first efforts to ensure that certain federally funded buildings and facilities are designed and constructed to be accessible to people with disabilities. Facilities that predate the law generally are not covered, but alterations or leases undertaken after the law took effect can trigger coverage.

Uniform standards for the design, construction and alteration of buildings were created so that persons with disabilities will have ready access to and use of them. These Uniform Federal Accessibility Standards (UFAS) are developed and maintained by an Access Board and serve as the basis for the standards used to enforce the law. The Board enforces the ABA by investigating complaints concerning particular facilities. Four Federal agencies are responsible for the setting the standards: the Department of Defense, the Department of Housing and Urban Development, the General Services Administration, and the U.S. Postal Service. These federal agencies are responsible for ensuring compliance with UFAS when funding the design, construction, alteration, or leasing of facilities. Some departments have, as a matter of policy, also required compliance with the Americans with Disabilities Act accessibility guidelines (which otherwise do not apply to the Federal sector) in addition to UFAS.

== Structure ==
The ABA (as amended) consists of seven sections:

- Section 1 defines the buildings or facilities covered by the Act.
- Section 2, 3, 4 and 4a describe the role of each standards-setting agency.
  - The General Services Administration (GSA) prescribes standards for all buildings subject to the Architectural Barriers Act that are not covered by standards issued by the other three standard-setting agencies;
  - The Department of Defense (DoD) prescribes standards for DoD installations;
  - The Department of Housing and Urban Development (HUD) prescribes standards for residential structures covered by the Architectural Barriers Act except those funded or constructed by DoD;
  - The U.S. Postal Service (USPS) prescribes standards for postal facilities.
- Section 5 states that buildings designed, constructed, or altered after the effective date (August 12, 1968) are covered under the Act.
- Section 6 concerns modification of standards and the granting of waivers.
- Section 7a requires that the Administrator of General Services report to Congress on his or her activities as they pertain to the act.
- Section 7b amends the Act to ensure compliance with the standards, by the establishment an independent Federal agency, the Architectural and Transportation Barriers Compliance Board established by section 502 of the Rehabilitation Act of 1973. 7b also requires report of the Compliance Board to the Senate "activities and actions to insure compliance with the standards prescribed under this Act."
