= Kiplinger =

American publisher

- Company type: Subsidiary
- Industry: Print media
- Founded: 1920; 106 years ago
- Founder: W. M. Kiplinger
- Headquarters: Washington, D.C., United States
- Parent: Future plc
- Website: www.kiplinger.com

Kiplinger (/ˈkɪplɪŋər/ KIP-ling-ər) is an American publisher of business forecasts and personal finance advice that is a subsidiary of Future plc.

Kiplinger Washington Editors, Inc., was a closely held company managed for more than nine decades by three generations of the Kiplinger family, until its sale in February 2019 to Dennis Publishing, a U.K.-based media company.

In 2021, Future plc acquired Dennis Publishing and with it Kiplinger.

== History ==
W. M. Kiplinger (1891–1967), a former AP economics reporter, founded the eponymous Washington, D.C. company in 1920. With his son Austin H. Kiplinger (1918–2015) he co-founded Kiplinger's Personal Finance Magazine in 1947. Grandson Knight A. Kiplinger continued the dynasty until the 2019 sale to Dennis Publishing.

In 2015, the company's former headquarters in D.C., the Editors Building, was listed on the National Register of Historic Places.

== Products ==
Its best-known publications are The Kiplinger Letter, a weekly business and economic forecasting periodical for people in management, and the monthly Kiplinger Personal Finance magazine.

Kiplinger also provides custom publishing services to a variety of companies and associations.
