= W. M. Kiplinger =

Founder of Kiplinger

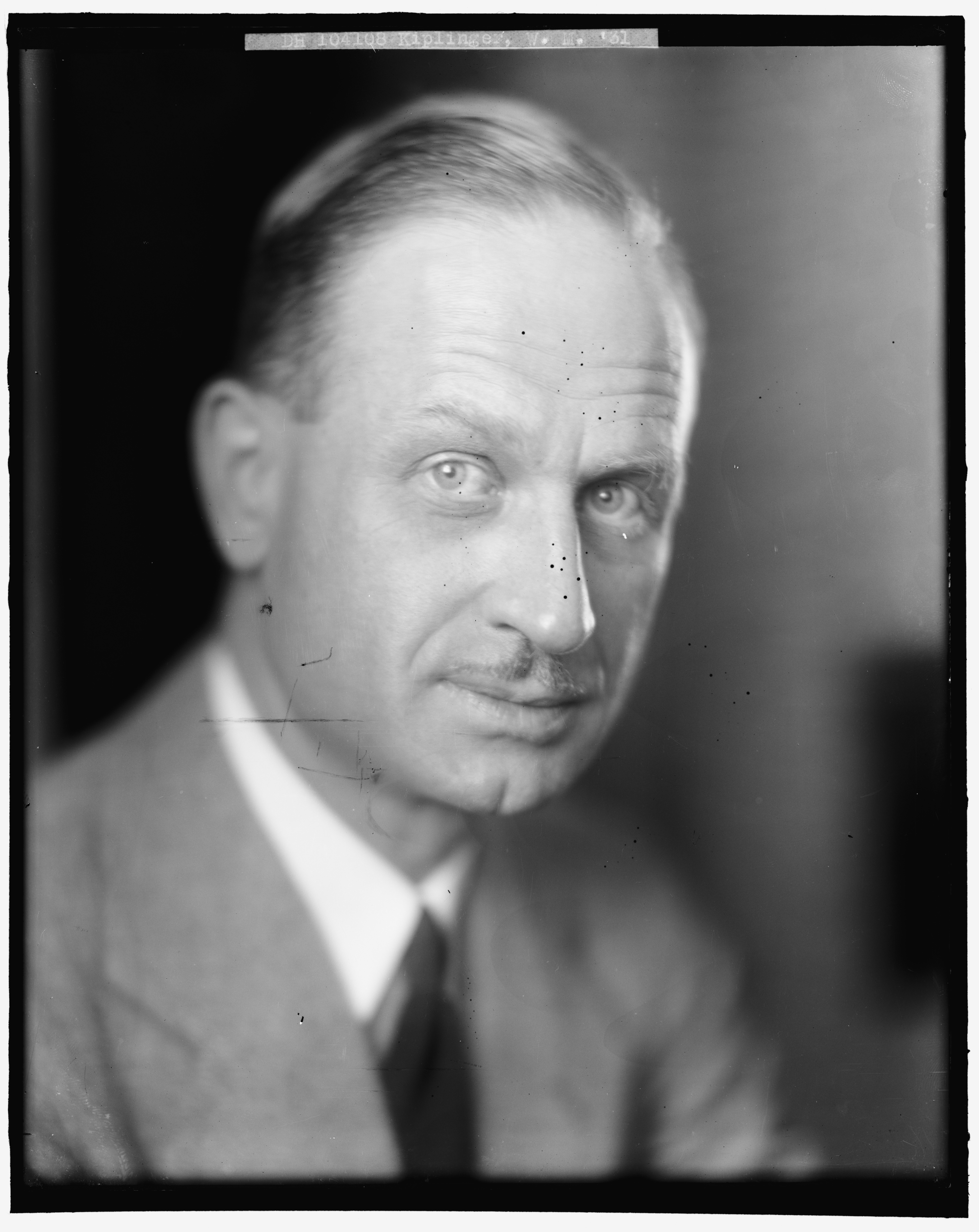
- Born: Willard Monroe Kiplinger; January 18, 1891; Bellefontaine, Ohio, U.S.
- Died: August 6, 1967 (aged 76); Bethesda, Maryland, U.S.
- Occupations: Journalist; editor; author

Willard Monroe Kiplinger (January 8, 1891 – August 6, 1967) [KIP-ling-er] was best known as the founder of Kiplinger, a publishing company located in Washington, D.C.

Kiplinger was born in Bellefontaine, Ohio, to parents Clarence E. and Cora Miller Kiplinger. He grew up on the north side of Columbus, Ohio. As a high school upperclassman he was editor of the school newspaper where one of the illustrators was Dudley Fisher. He attended Ohio State University from 1908 until 1912 and was a member of Sigma Pi Fraternity. He and Ray Evans recruited Fisher into the fraternity. While at OSU he was editor of the school newspaper, The Lantern. When he graduated he was one of the first two journalism graduates from the school. His first job after graduation in 1913 was with the Ohio State Journal.

On June 20, 1914, he married his first wife, Irene Austin of Toledo, in Lucas County, Ohio. She introduced him to Unitarianism and he was a member of the church for the rest of his life. Their first child, a daughter named Jane Austin, died shortly after birth in 1916. They had a son named Austin and a daughter named Jane Ann before divorcing. He married his second wife, Lillian "LaVerne" Colwell, in Harrisonburg, Virginia on May 18, 1936. They had a daughter named Bonnie.

He moved to Washington, D.C. in 1916 where he worked for the Associated Press. He and his family attended All Souls Unitarian Church, which was the same church William Taft attended. He started the company Kiplinger in 1920 as an "intelligence bureau" for out-of-town banks and businesses. He started The Kiplinger Letter in 1923 and in 1947 began publishing Kiplinger Magazine. He also donated his time as a contributing editor to The Emerald of Sigma Pi magazine.

In 1942 he published a book titled Washington Is Like That which focused on the inner organization of the federal government.

In 1952 he played a large role in soliciting funds and local business support to help educational television station WETA-TV begin operations.

Kiplinger's son Austin H. Kiplinger succeeded him as head of the publishing company.

Kiplinger Distinguished Contributions to Journalism is an award given by the National Press Foundation in his honor. Laverne & Willard's daughter Bonnie had 2 children with her husband Eugene Watts, Kevin Watts in 1961, and Keith Watts 1963.
