= Franz Biebl =

German composer

- Born: 1 September 1906; Pursruck, Bavaria, Germany
- Died: 2 October 2001 (aged 95); Munich, Bavaria
- Occupations: Composer; Choral conductor; Academic teacher
- Organizations: Mozarteum

Franz Xaver Biebl (1 September 1906 – 2 October 2001) was a German composer of classical music and an academic teacher. Most of his compositions were for choral ensembles. He became known internationally when Chanticleer made his Ave Maria part of the repertoire.

== Life and career ==
Biebl was born in Pursruck, now part of Freudenberg, Bavaria, in 1906. He studied composition at the Musikhochschule in Munich. Biebl served as choir director at the Catholic church of St Maria in München-Thalkirchen from 1932 until 1939, and as an assistant professor of choral music at the Mozarteum in Salzburg, beginning in 1939, where he taught voice and music theory.

Biebl was drafted into the military beginning in 1943 during World War II. He was a prisoner of war from 1944 to 1946, being detained at Fort Custer in Battle Creek, Michigan. After the war, he moved from Austria to Fürstenfeldbruck, where he served as director of the municipal chorus.

He died in Munich on 2 October 2001, at the age of 95.

== Ave Maria ==
Biebl's best-known work is his Ave Maria, which sets portions of the Angelus as well as the Ave Maria. The piece was composed sometime before 1 May 1959. The original composition was in the key of D major, but changed to C major when it was published by Wildt's Musikverlag in 1964. The piece was brought to the United States by the Cornell University Glee Club in 1970. The ensemble met Biebl while on tour in Germany, during a recording session at a radio network where Biebl was music director. Conductor Thomas A. Sokol was given a number of Biebl's works, premiering them after returning home. The Ave Maria quickly gained popularity, most notably after becoming part of the repertoire of Chanticleer. Although the Ave Maria was originally scored for TTB/TTBB choir, in 1985 Biebl prepared additional arrangements for SAT/SATB (in B flat major) and SAA/TTBB choirs. In 1998, Biebl prepared a fourth arrangement for SSA/SSAA choir. As part of the Hinshaw Music, Inc. sheet music catalog, the four versions have sold over 670,000 copies between 1992 and 2016.
