= Bernard Rands =

British and American composer (1934–2026)

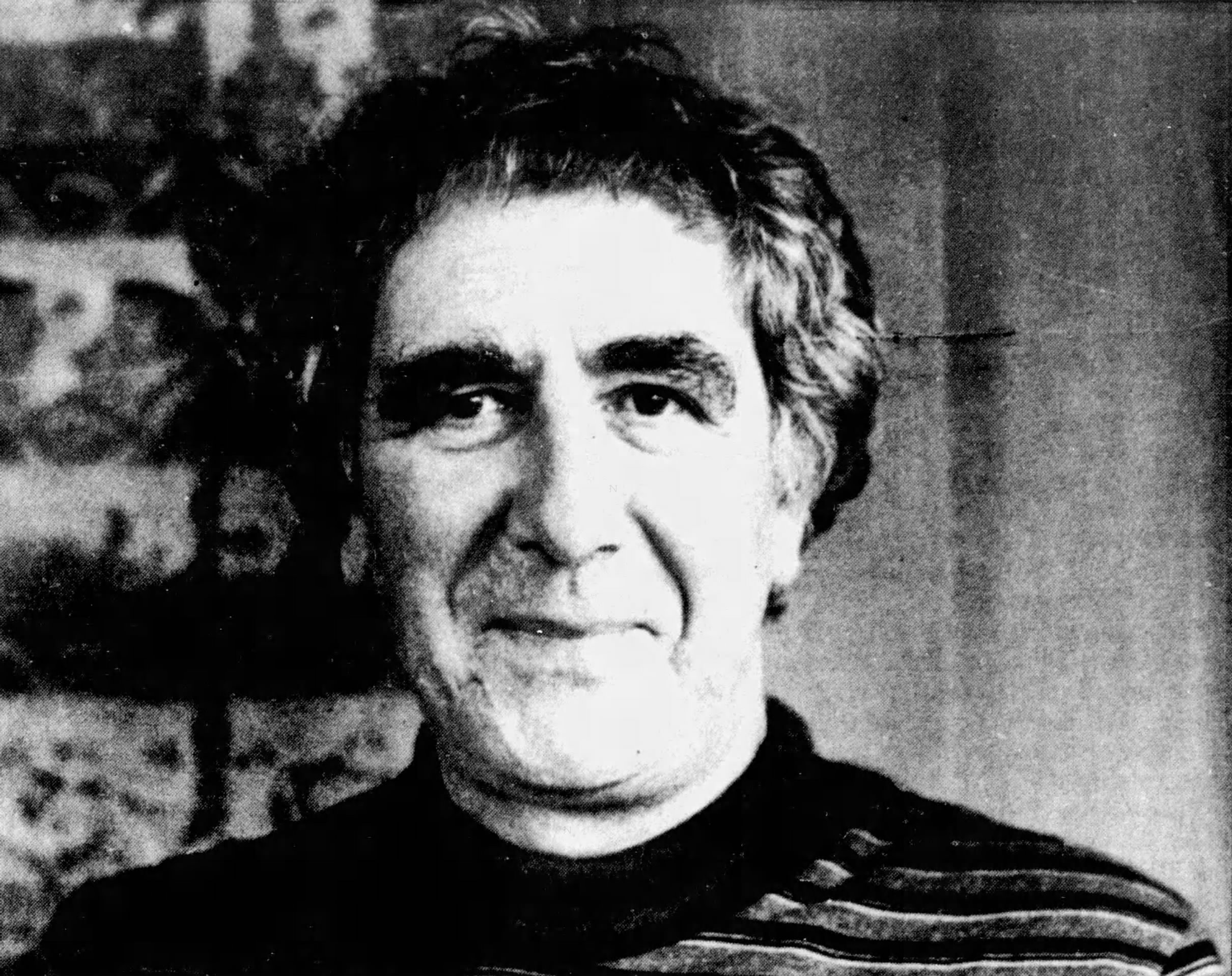
- Rands in 1983
- Born: 2 March 1934; Sheffield, England
- Died: 4 March 2026 (aged 92); Chicago, Illinois, U.S.
- Occupation: Composer
- Spouse: Augusta Read Thomas (m. 1994)
- Website: bernardrands.com

Bernard Rands (2 March 1934 – 4 March 2026) was a British and American contemporary classical composer and professor. He composed orchestral works and chamber music, often with a vocal element, and a series of Memos for solo instruments. His Canti del Sole for tenor and orchestra received the Pulitzer Prize for Music in 1984. He taught at Harvard University from 1988 to 2005.

== Life and career ==
Rands was born on 2 March 1934. He studied music and English literature at the University of Wales, Bangor, and composition with Pierre Boulez and Bruno Maderna at the Darmstädter Ferienkurse, and with Luigi Dallapiccola and Luciano Berio in Milan.

Rands held residencies at Princeton University, the University of Illinois, and the University of York before emigrating to the United States in 1975; he became a U.S. citizen in 1983. In 1984, Rands's Canti del Sole, premiered by tenor Paul Sperry and the New York Philharmonic conducted by Zubin Mehta, won the Pulitzer Prize for Music. He taught at the University of California, San Diego, the Juilliard School, Yale University, and Boston University. From 1988 to 2005 he taught at Harvard University, where he was Walter Bigelow Rosen Professor of Music.

Rands received many awards for his work, and was elected and inducted into The American Academy of Arts and Letters in 2004. From 1989 to 1995 he was composer-in-residence with the Philadelphia Orchestra. Rands's music is widely recorded. The recording of his Canti D'Amor by the men's vocal ensemble Chanticleer won a Grammy Award in 2000. Rands was married to American composer Augusta Read Thomas.

Rands died in Chicago on 4 March 2026.

== Works ==
Rands's music was published by Schott. The publisher maintains works and their performances on its website.

=== Opera ===
- Belladonna (1999)
  opera in two acts, with a libretto by Leslie Dunton Downer, commissioned by the Aspen Festival. Première: 1999, Aspen Music Festival, Colorado
- Vincent (c. 1973–2010)
  opera based on the life of Vincent van Gogh, with libretto by J. D. McClatchy, commissioned by Indiana University. Première performances: 8–9, 15–16 April 2011, Bloomington, Indiana.

=== Orchestral ===
- Per esempio (1968)
  commissioned by the West Riding Youth Orchestra, Yorkshire
- Wildtrack 1 (1969)
  commissioned by the BBC Symphony Orchestra for the 1969 York Festival, premièred under Pierre Boulez (dedicated to Gilbert Amy)
- Agenda (1970)
  commissioned by the Department of Education and Science for the London Schools Symphony Orchestra
- Metalepsis 2 (1971), for mezzo-soprano, small choir & chamber orchestra
  commissioned by the London Sinfonietta, who gave the première in 1972 with soprano Cathy Berberian, conducted by Luciano Berio at the English Bach Festival
- Mésalliance (1972), for piano solo & orchestra
  commissioned by the BBC Symphony Orchestra, premièred by pianist Roger Woodward under Pierre Boulez
- Wildtrack 2 (1973), for soprano solo & orchestra
  commissioned by the BBC Symphony Orchestra, and premièred at the 1973 Cheltenham Festival under John Pritchard.
- Aum (1974), for harp solo & chamber orchestra
  commissioned by the BBC Symphony Orchestra for Pierre Boulez's series of contemporary concerts at Roundhouse, London
- Madrigali (1977), for chamber orchestra
  commissioned by the National Symphony Chamber Orchestra, Washington, D.C., and premièred at the Kennedy Center. The work has most recently been performed by the Jungen Philharmonie Zentralschweiz and the University of Nottingham Philharmonia.
- Canti Lunatici (1981), for soprano solo & orchestra
  commissioned by the BBC Symphony Orchestra for soprano Dorothy Dorow, premièred under Rands in 1981
- Canti del Sole (1983), for tenor solo & orchestra
  full version commissioned by the New York Philharmonic, and premièred under Zubin Mehta and tenor Paul Sperry in 1983. The work won the 1984 Pulitzer Prize for Music.
- Le Tambourin: Suites 1 & 2 (1984)
  the two suites were commissioned respectively by the Fromm Foundation for the San Diego Symphony and the Koussevitzky Foundation for the Philadelphia Orchestra, who premièred the complete work under Riccardo Muti in 1984. The work was awarded first place in the 1986 Kennedy Center Friedheim Awards. The work has since been performed widely by many orchestras, including (most recently) the Buffalo Philharmonic.
- Ceremonial 2 (1986)
  15-minute work commissioned by Suntory Hall, Tokyo; premièred there in 1989
- Fanfare for a Festival (1986)
  commissioned by the Colorado Music Festival, Boulder, for the 10th anniversary festival
- Hiraeth (1987), for cello solo & orchestra
  commissioned by the Aspen Music Festival, premièred by cellist Yehuda Hanani with the Aspen Festival Orchestra conducted by Rands. Subsequent performances took place with Hanani the BBC National Orchestra of Wales soon after.
- ...body and shadow... (1988)
  commissioned by the Boston Symphony Orchestra, and premièred under Seiji Ozawa at Symphony Hall in 1989. Emily Freeman Brown and the Bowling Green Philharmonia have since taken the work into their repertoire.
- London Serenade (1988)
  written as a gift for conductor Edwin London, who premièred the work with the Cleveland Chamber Symphony. Recent performances have been given by the Verge Ensemble and the Buffalo Philharmonic.
- Bells (1989), for S.A.T.B. choir & orchestra
  commissioned by the Northeastern Pennsylvania Philharmonic
- Ceremonial 3 (1991)
  commissioned by the Philadelphia Orchestra, premièred under Riccardo Muti. Subsequent performances have taken place by the Bristol University Symphony Orchestra
- Canti dell'Eclisse (1992), for bass solo & orchestra
  commissioned by the Philadelphia Orchestra, premièred under Gerard Schwarz with bass Thomas Paul. The work has since been championed by Gil Rose and the Boston Modern Orchestra Project.
- Ceremonial (1992–93), for wind band
  commissioned by the University of Michigan Symphony Band, Ann Arbor. A widely performed work, Ceremonial has most recently been performed by the Eastman Wind Ensemble and the concert bands of the Oberlin Conservatory, Boston Conservatory, Columbus State University, Yale University, New England Conservatory, DePaul University, University of Washington and Florida International University, among numerous others.
- Tre Canzoni senza Parole (1993)
  commissioned by the Philadelphia Orchestra, premièred under Rands in 1992. The Oregon Symphony has since championed this work.
- ...where the murmurs die... (1993)
  commissioned by the New York Philharmonic, premièred under Leonard Slatkin at Avery Fisher Hall in December 1993
- Canzoni (1995)
  commissioned by the Philadelphia Orchestra, premièred under Wolfgang Sawallisch in Philadelphia. A further performance was given by the same forces at the 1995 BBC Proms in the Royal Albert Hall, London
- Interludium (1995), for S.A.T.B. choir & orchestra
  commissioned as part of the Requiem of Reconciliation, premièred in 1995 by the Israel Philharmonic under Helmuth Rilling
- Symphony (1995)
  commissioned by the Los Angeles Philharmonic, premièred under Esa-Pekka Salonen in 1995
- Cello Concerto (1996)
  commissioned by the Boston Symphony Orchestra for Mstislav Rostropovich, premièred under Seiji Ozawa in 1997. Recent performances have taken place at Symphony Center with the Chicago Symphony under Pierre Boulez, with cellist Johannes Moser.
- Fanfare (1996)
  commissioned by the Cincinnati Symphony
- Requiescant (1996), for soprano solo, S.A.T.B. choir & orchestra
  30-minute work, originally commissioned by the BBC for the 1985 Proms Season, but wasn't completed in time. It was recommissioned in 1995 for the Philadelphia Choral Society
- Triple Concerto (1997), for piano, cello & percussion soli & orchestra
  commissioned by the Core Ensemble and the Cleveland Chamber Symphony with funds provided by the Meet the Composer Consortium Program, premièred by those forces conducted by Edwin London
- apókryphos (2002), for soprano solo, S.A.T.B. choir & orchestra
  major 40-minute work setting texts by Paul Celan, Heinrich Heine, Nelly Sachs, Franz Werfel and English translations of extracts from the Apocrypha. Commissioned by the Chicago Symphony Orchestra and Chorus, and premièred at Symphony Center in May 2003 with soprano Angela Denoke under Daniel Barenboim (choral director: Duain Wolfe). Further performances have taken place in Germany and Austria in 2010, at the Berlin Philharmonie and the Konzerthaus, Großer Saal by the Staatskapelle Berlin and Staatsopernchor Berlin, again with Daniel Barenboim conducting.
- Unending Lightning (2002), for wind band
  commissioned by the Eastman School of Music
- Chains Like the Sea (2008)
  commissioned by the New York Philharmonic, premièred under Lorin Maazel at Avery Fisher Hall in October 2008
- Danza Petrificada (2009–10)
  commissioned by the Chicago Symphony and premièred under Riccardo Muti at Symphony Center, 5–7 & 10 May 2011
- Adieu (2010), for brass quintet & string orchestra
  commissioned by the Seattle Symphony, due to première under Gerard Schwarz at Benaroya Hall, Seattle, on 7 December 2010

=== Chamber ===
- Actions for Six (1962), for flute, viola, cello, harp & two percussion
  written for the 1963 Darmstadt Festival; premièred by the Kranichsteiner Ensemble under Bruno Maderna
- Espressione IV. (1964), for two pianos
  premièred at the 1965 Darmstädter Ferienkurse by Aloys and Alfons Kontarsky
- Ballad 1 (1970), for mezzo-soprano solo, flute, trombone, piano, percussion & contrabass
  written for SONOR Ensemble, a group formed by Rands. Text by Gilbert Sorrentino.
- Tableau (1970), for flute, clarinet, piano, percussion, viola & cello
- as all get out (1972), for miscellaneous instrumental ensemble
  notated as a graphic score; the duration of the work can be anywhere from 5 to 20 minutes
- déjà (1972), for flute, clarinet, piano, percussion, viola & cello
- Response – Memo 1B (1973), for contrabass & tape / two contrabassi
- Cuaderno (1974), for string quartet
- étendre (1974), for solo contrabass, flute, clarinet, horn, trumpet, trombone, piano, electric organ, percussion, violin, viola & cello
  15-minute work, based on Rands's Memo 1 (for solo double bass, from 1971), and was written for bassist Bertram Turetzky and commissioned by the Claremont Festival, California.
- Scherzi (1974), for clarinet, piano, violin & cello
  commissioned by the Capricorn Ensemble with funds provided by the Arts Council of Great Britain
- Obbligato – Memo 2C (1980), for trombone & string quartet
- ...in the receding mist... (1988), for flute, harp, violin, viola & cello
  commissioned by the Arts Council of Great Britain for the ONDINE Ensemble, and is dedicated to Jacob Druckman on the occasion of his sixtieth birthday. Premièred in Washington D.C. in November 1988. Recent performances have been given by the Boston Musica Viva under Richard Pittman, the North/South Consonance Ensemble under Max Lifchitz, the Verge Ensemble (Buffalo, New York), the Dal Niente New Music Group (Chicago), and ensembles at the Indiana University School of Music and the Arizona State University.
- ...and the rain... (1992), for horn, harp, violin, viola & cello
- String Quartet No. 2 (1994)
  commissioned by the Philadelphia Chamber Music Society for the Mendelssohn Quartet (who, in 2003, recorded the work on BIS Records). The work has since been taken up by the Fifth House Ensemble, DePaul University, Chicago.
- ...sans voix parmi les voix... (1995), for flute, harp & viola
  commissioned by the Chicago Symphony Orchestra Association in honour of the 70th birthday of Pierre Boulez
- Concertino (1996), for oboe solo, flute, clarinet, harp, two violins, viola & cello
  commissioned by Network for New Music with generous support from Anni Baker; premièred in 1998 conducted by Jan Krzywicki. Recent performances have taken place with the Dal Niente New Music Group (Chicago), the University of Illinois Urbana-Champaign New Music Ensemble, ensembles from the University of Nevada, the University of Iowa (who recorded the work on Capstone Records in 2006) and Yale University, and at the June in Buffalo Festival (New York).
- Fanfare (1997), for brass quintet
  commissioned by the Atlantic Brass Quintet
- String Quartet No. 3 (2003)
  commissioned by the Eastman School of Music (financial support from the Howard Hanson Foundation) for the Ying Quartet. Premièred by that ensemble in January 2004 at Symphony Space, New York City
- Prelude (2004), for flute, viola & harp
  commissioned for the 2004 June in Buffalo Festival
- ...now again... (2006), for mezzo-soprano solo, flute, clarinet, trumpet, percussion, harp, violin, viola & cello
  commissioned by Network for New Music, and premièred by that ensemble in November 2006 with mezzos-soprano Janice Felty
- PRISM (Memo 6B) (2008), for saxophone quartet
  10-minute work commissioned by the New York State Arts Council for the Prism Quartet. Premièred: 21 November 2008 in Philadelphia, by the same artists.
- Scherzi No. 2 (2008), for clarinet, piano, violin & cello
  18-minute work

=== Vocal ===
- Ballad 1 (1970), for mezzo-soprano solo & ensemble
  written for SONOR ensemble, a group formed by Rands. Text by Gilbert Sorrentino.
- Ballad 2 (1970), for female voice & piano
  commissioned by Jane Manning
- Metalepsis 2 (1971), for mezzo-soprano solo, small choir & chamber orchestra
  commissioned by the London Sinfonietta, who gave the première in 1972 with soprano Cathy Berberian, conducted by Luciano Berio at the English Bach Festival
- Ballad 3 (1973), for soprano & tape (plus bell)
- Wildtrack 2 (1973), for soprano solo & orchestra
- Canti Lunatici (1980), for soprano & ensemble/orchestra
- déjà 2 (1980), for female voice solo & ensemble
- Canti del Sole (1984), for tenor solo & ensemble/orchestra
- Canti dell'Eclisse (1992), for bass solo & ensemble/orchestra
- Walcott Songs (2004), for mezzo-soprano & cello
  song-cycle to texts by Derek Walcott, commissioned by the Tanglewood Summer Music Festival; premièred in the Seiji Ozawa Hall in January 2005 by Abigail Fischer (mezzo-soprano) and Norman Fischer (cello)
- ...now again... (2006), for mezzo-soprano & ensemble
  commissioned by Network for New Music, and premièred by that ensemble in November 2006 with mezzos-soprano Janice Felty

=== Choral ===
- ...among the voices... (1988), for S.A.T.B. choir & harp
  commissioned by Robert Page, who led the première in Cleveland in April 1988 with Paula Page (harp) and the Page Singers. Text by Samuel Beckett.
- Bells (1989), for S.A.T.B. choir & orchestra
  commissioned by the Northeastern Pennsylvania Philharmonic
- Canti d'Amor (1991), for a cappella S.A.T.B. choir
  commissioned by Chanticleer, premièred in 2000 in San Francisco by that group. Sets texts from James Joyce's Chamber Music.
- Introit (1992), for a cappella S.A.T.B. choir
  brief 2-minute work, commissioned by the Howard University Chapel. Text by George Herbert.
- Interludium (1995), for S.A.T.B. choir & orchestra
  commissioned as part of the Requiem of Reconciliation, premièred in 1995 by the Israel Philharmonic under Helmuth Rilling
- Requiescant (1996), for soprano solo, S.A.T.B. choir & orchestra
  30-minute work, originally commissioned by the BBC for the 1985 Proms Season but not completed in time. It was recommissioned in 1995 for the Philadelphia Choral Society
- Melancholy Madrigal (2001), for a cappella S.A.T.B. choir
  commissioned by the Cambridge Madrigal Singers, Massachusetts, premièred in 2001 in Cambridge by that group.
- apókryphos (2002), for soprano solo, S.A.T.B. choir & orchestra
  major 40-minute work setting texts by Paul Celan, Heinrich Heine, Nelly Sachs, Franz Werfel and English translations of extracts from the Apocrypha. Commissioned by the Chicago Symphony Orchestra and Chorus, and premièred at Symphony Center in May 2003 with soprano Angela Denoke under Daniel Barenboim (choral director: Duain Wolfe). Further performances have taken place in Germany and Austria in 2010, at the Berlin Philharmonie and the Konzerthaus, Großer Saal by the Staatskapelle Berlin and Staatsopernchor Berlin, again with Daniel Barenboim conducting.
- My Child (2003), for a cappella S.A.T.B. choir
  a movement from apókryphos
- Trinity (2008), for a cappella male-voice choir
  commissioned by the Cornell University Glee Club, and premièred under Scott Tucker in September 2008 in Ithaca, New York
- Folk Songs (2014), an arrangement of songs of personal meaning, including "On Ilkley Moor Baht 'at" and "Mi Hamaca". Premiered under Karina Canellakis at the 2014 Tanglewood Festival of Contemporary Music.

=== Solo instrumental ===
- Tre Espressione (1960), for piano
- Formants 1 – Les Gestes (1965), for harp
- Memo 1 (1971), for contrabass
  commissioned by Barry Guy; premièred at the English Bach Festival, Oxford in 1972
- Memo 2 (1973), for trombone
- Memo 3 (1989), for cello
- Memo 4 (1997), for flute
  commissioned by Ekkehart Trenkner for Judith Pierce, who gave the work's première in 1997
- Memo 5 (1975), for piano
- Memo 6 (1999), for alto saxophone
- Memo 7 (2000), for female voice
- Memo 8 (2000), for oboe
- HBDZ (2001), for piano
- Preludes (2007), for piano
- Three Piano Pieces (2010)

=== Music theatre ===
- Ballad 2 (1970), for female voice & piano
  commissioned by Jane Manning
- Ballad 3 (1973), for soprano & tape (plus bell)
- Memo 2B (1980), for trombone and female mime
- Memo 2D (1980), for trombone, string quartet and female mime

=== Educational ===
- Sound Patterns 1 (1967), for voices & hands
- Sound Patterns 2 (1967), for voices, percussion and miscellaneous instruments
- Per Esempio (1969), for youth orchestra
- Sound Patterns 3 (1969), for voices (project)
- Sound Patterns 4 (1969), for miscellaneous instrumental groups (graphic score)
- Agenda (1970), for youth orchestra

== Awards ==
In 2014 Rands was inducted to The Lincoln Academy of Illinois as a Laureate of the Arts and was awarded the Order of Lincoln (the state's highest honor) by the governor of Illinois.

== Sources ==
- Kennedy, Michael and Kennedy, Joyce Bourne, eds. (2006). "Rands, Bernard". The Oxford Dictionary of Music (2nd rev. ed.). Oxford: Oxford University Press. ISBN 0-19-861459-4. OCLC 218497718.
