= Far Above Cayuga's Waters =

Cornell University alma mater

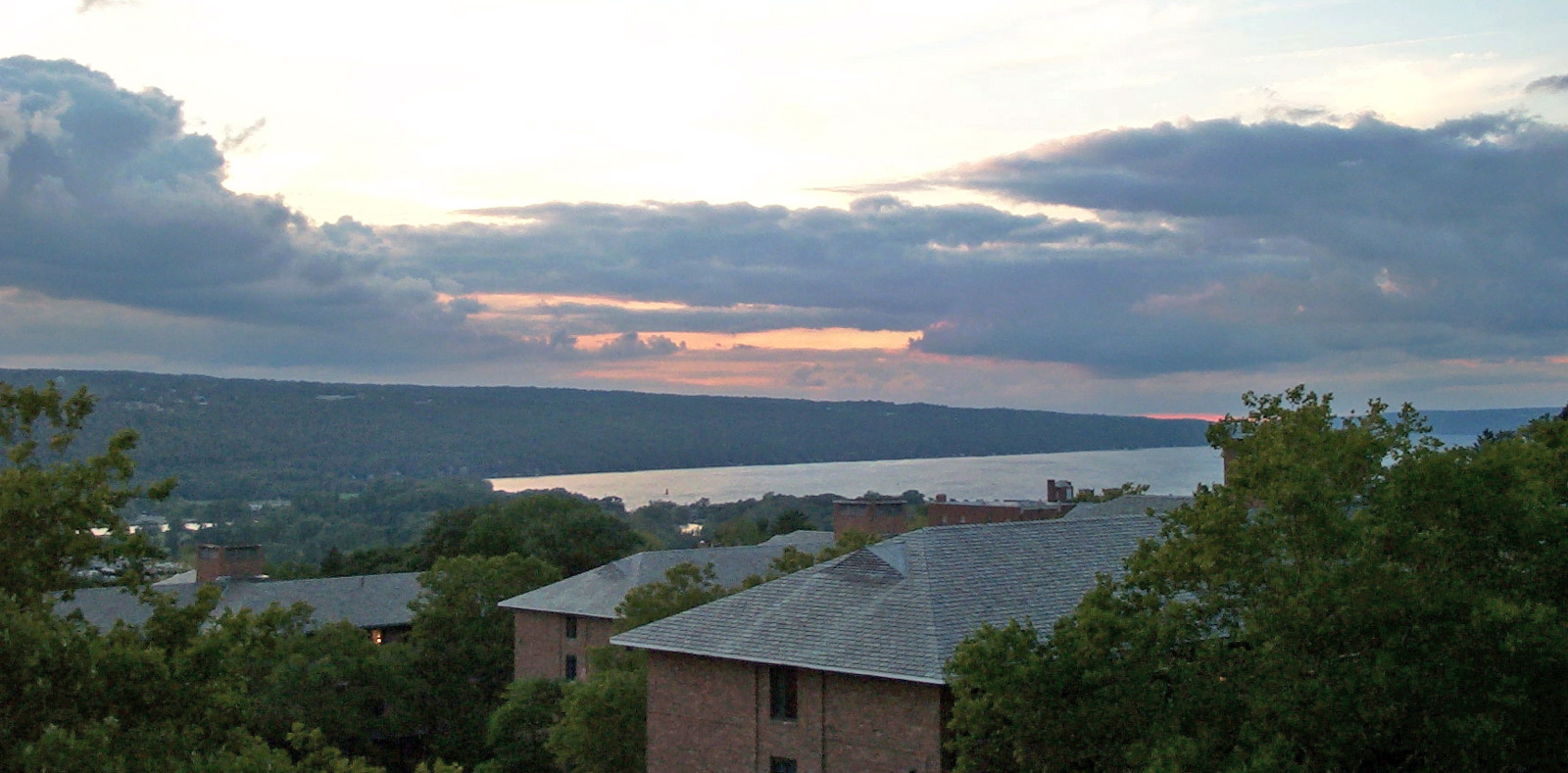
View of Cayuga Lake from Cornell University

"Far Above Cayuga's Waters" is Cornell University's alma mater. The lyrics were written circa 1870 by roommates Archibald Croswell Weeks (Class of 1872), and Wilmot Moses Smith (Class of 1874), and set to the tune of "Annie Lisle", a popular 1857 ballad by H. S. Thompson about a heroine dying of tuberculosis.

Alma mater of Cornell University

== History ==
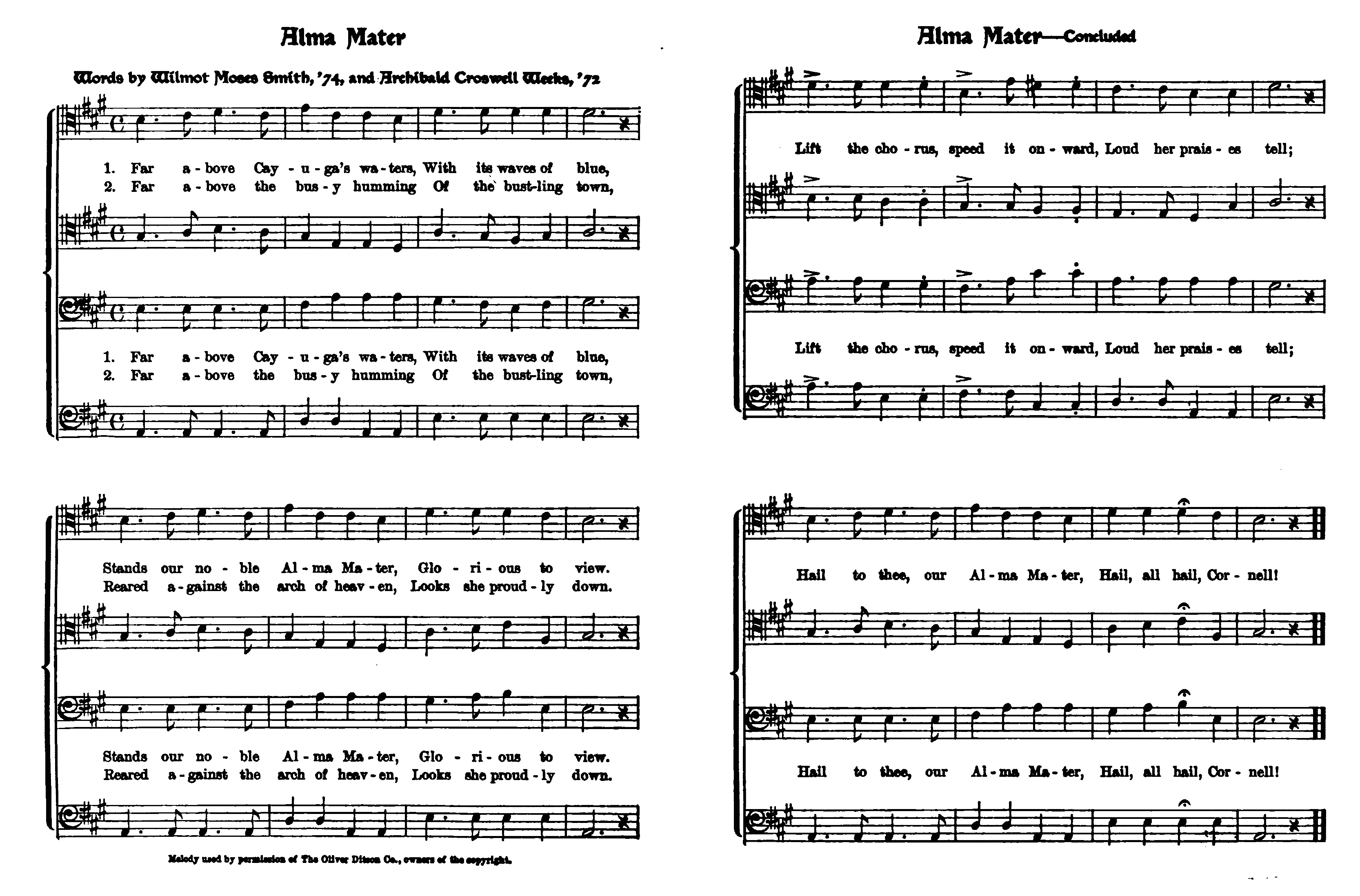
"Far Above Cayuga's Waters" as printed in Songs of Cornell in 1906

This song is one of the better-known alma maters in the United States. It is the only alma mater song included in Ronald Herder's 500 Best-Loved Song Lyrics. In a novel, Betty Smith called it "the saddest and oldest of all college songs". Edward Abbey, in One Life at a Time, Please, mentions a campfire sing in which he contributed "the first line of the only Ivy League song that occurred to me: 'Far above Cayuga's waters . . .'".

The tune has been used since by dozens of universities, colleges, high schools, and camps worldwide. For example, George Penny, a professor at the University of Kansas, wrote his school's alma mater by changing a few words from Cornell's song, "Far above the golden valley...".

Other colleges and universities that have used the same tune include Centenary College of Louisiana, Michigan State University, University of Wisconsin–La Crosse, the College of William and Mary, the Colorado State University, University of North Carolina at Chapel Hill, Florida A&M University, Syracuse University, Shippensburg University, the University of Missouri, the University of Georgia, the University of Alabama, Indiana University, Wofford College, Spartanburg Methodist College, Ripon College, Birmingham-Southern College, Emory University, University of Akron, Erskine College, Lehigh University, Lewis & Clark College, Moravian College, Xavier University, Acadia University, Salem College, Swarthmore College, Vanderbilt University, Howard Payne University, the American University of Beirut, Chung Chi College of The Chinese University of Hong Kong, Lingnan University, Lingnan (University) College of China's Sun Yat-sen University, Hwa Chong Institution, Chung Ling High School, East Tennessee State University, Randolph-Macon College, Winona State University (Minnesota) and even the hoax Plainfield Teachers College. It is the tune of the alma mater of New York Military Academy, and the camp song of Boy Scout Camp Tesomas near Rhinelander, Wisconsin; Boy Scout Camp Napowan in Waushara County, Wisconsin; Camp Minsi in Pocono Summit, Pennsylvania; Camp Emerald Bay on Santa Catalina Island, California; The Depot Christian School in Greenville, Texas; and Camp Becket in the Berkshires.

The song traditionally concludes campus performances by the Cornell University Chorus and Cornell University Glee Club. It is also heard between the second and third periods of men's ice hockey games, halftime or the end of the third quarter of football games, and half time of other Cornell athletic contests attended by the Cornell Big Red Pep Band. A rendition of the tune is also used to conclude all of the school's daily afternoon chime concerts, whose evening performances traditionally ended with the "Evening Song"; the morning concert begins with the "Jennie McGraw Rag" but has no traditional finale.

The originating melody used was the song "Annie Lisle", composed by; H S Thompson in 1857, the same melody was used as a church hymn and appears as; "There's a book I love to read" in the book "Golden bells, or hymns for our children" London, 1899.

== Lyrics ==
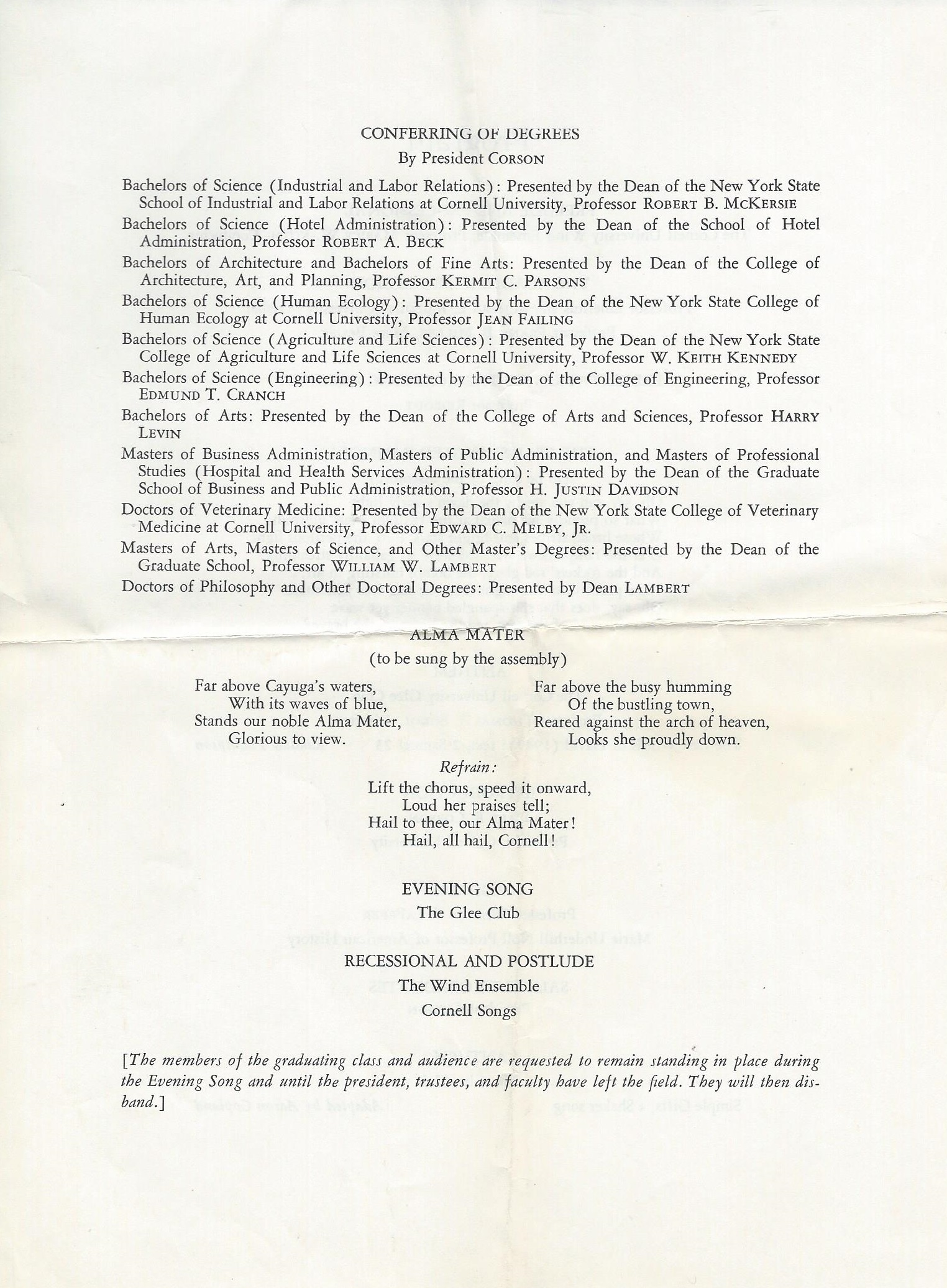
Lyrics to the alma mater as they appear in the 1976 Cornell commencement program

The first two verses are the best known and are usually the only verses sung. The song, however, has six verses and no refrains. However, in common practice, only the first two verses are sung, and they share the lines "Lift the chorus, speed it onward, loud her praises tell; / Hail to thee our Alma Mater! Hail, all hail, Cornell!" Due to this symmetry, whenever only the first two verses are printed or sung, it is customary to consider lines 1–2 and 5–6 as being verses 1 and 2, respectively, and lines 3–4 and 7–8 as being a single repeated refrain:

Verse one
Far above Cayuga's waters,
With its waves of blue,
Stands our noble Alma Mater,
Glorious to view.

Refrain

Lift the chorus, speed it onward,
Loud her praises tell;
Hail to thee, our Alma Mater!
Hail, all hail, Cornell!

Verse two
Far above the busy humming
Of the bustling town,
Reared against the arch of heaven,
Looks she proudly down.

== Recordings ==
The oldest known recording of the song is the Cornell University Glee Club's recording made on January 2, 1914, at the Columbia Phonograph Company on 38th Street in New York City. The record was distributed later that year as a 10-inch 78 RPM recording. The song "Cornell" was recorded on the other side.

The song has been recorded many times since by Cornell's various vocal and instrumental ensembles.

== In popular culture ==
The song was heard in the 1953 film Titanic, in which it is sung by Robert Wagner and Purdue University students.

The song was in Season 2, Episode 8 of Marvel's Agent Carter.

The song was also sung by the a cappella group Here Comes Treble in Season 9, Episode 5 of The Office and by Andy Bernard in Season 9, Episode 22, during his audition for America's Next A Cappella Sensation.

The tune, with different lyrics, is used in the parting song for the Kellerman Resort in the 1987 film Dirty Dancing.

== See also ==
- List of Cornell University songs
