= Moses Smith (disambiguation) =

Moses Smith (born 1976) is an American racing driver.

Moses Smith may also refer to:

- Moses "Whispering" Smith (1932–1984), American blues harmonicist and singer
- Wilmot Moses Smith (1852–1906), American jurist and songwriter
