= List of Cornell University songs =

This is a list of traditional songs associated with Cornell University. Most of the songs were popularized by, and were written by members or alumni of, the Cornell Glee Club, Cornell's tenor-bass chorus. Most formal concerts of the Glee Club or Cornell Chorus conclude with selections of Cornell songs. The songs are also sung at football games and played by the marching band.

The list is in chronological order and includes the first line of each song, as that is how many students identify the songs.

== Presently performed ==
These songs have been performed by the Glee Club or Chorus at least as recently as 2007. Several, such as the Alma Mater and the Evening Song, are performed multiple times per year. Others, such as the Crew Song, may be revived only once every two to three years.

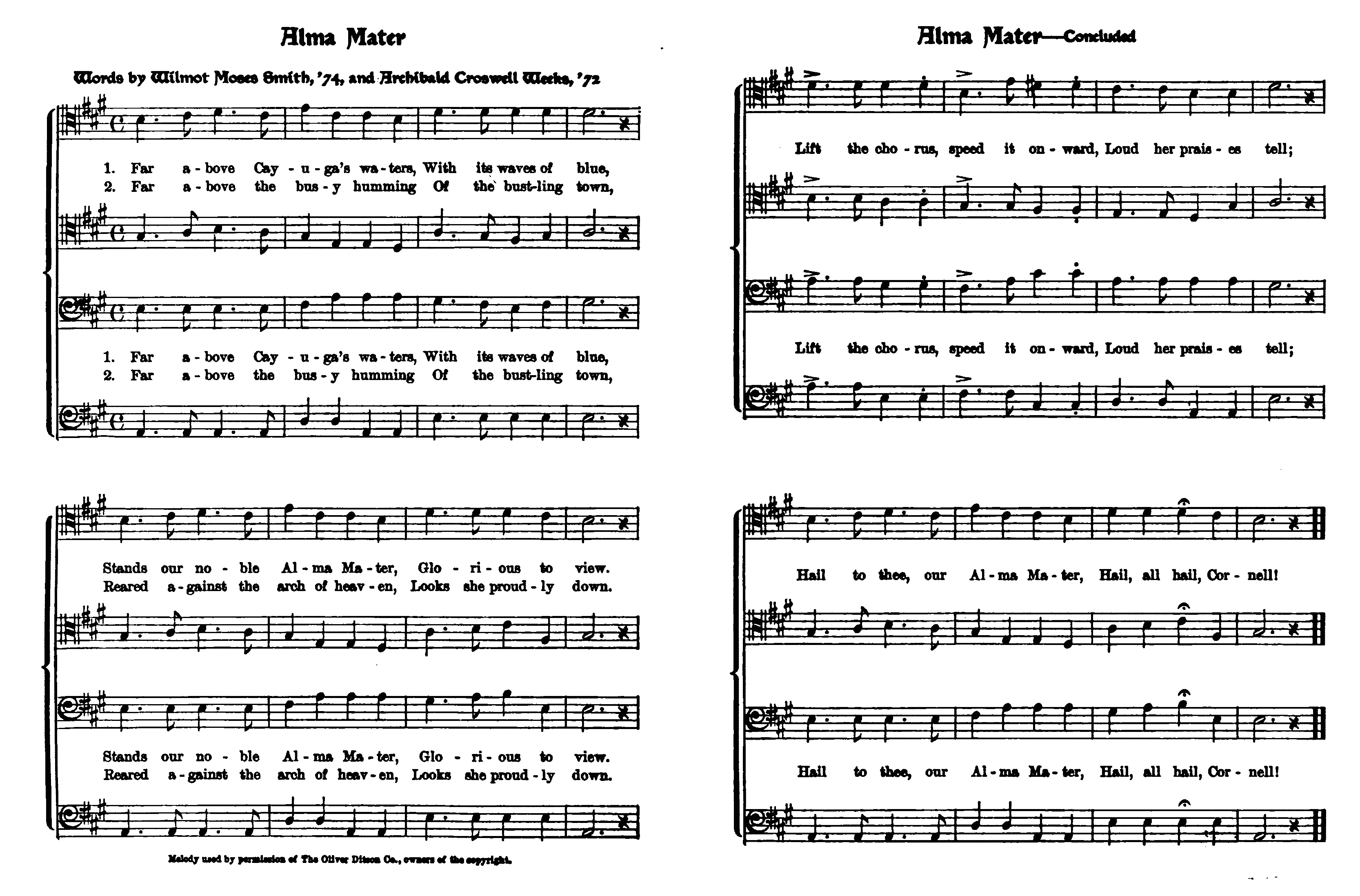
"Far Above Cayuga's Waters" as printed in Songs of Cornell in 1906

- Alma Mater – "Far above Cayuga's waters..."
  - Words: Wilmot Moses Smith, Class of 1874, and Archibald Croswell Weeks, Class of 1872
  - Music: H. S. Thompson
  - Written: 1857 (music), 1870 (words)
- Evening Song – "When the sun fades far away..."
  - Words: Henry Tyrrell, Class of 1880
  - Music: Traditional (O Tannenbaum)
  - Written: 1877 (words)
- Song of the Classes – "Oh, I am the freshman..."
  - Words: Frank Addison Abbott, Class of 1890
  - Music: Traditional
  - Written: 1890 (words)
- Crew Song – "Onward like the swallow going..."
  - Words: Robert James Kellogg, Class of 1891
  - Music: William Luton Wood
  - Written: 1892 (words), 1900 (music)
- Alumni Song – "I am thinking tonight of my old college town..."
  - Words: Louis Carl Ehle, Class of 1890
  - Music: William Luton Wood
  - Written: 1893 (words), 1900 (music)
- Davy – "Give my regards to Davy..."
  - Words: Charles Edward Tourison, Class of 1906, W. L. Umstad, Class of 1906, and Bill Forbes, Class of 1906
  - Music: George M. Cohan
  - Written: 1905
- The Big Red Team – "See them plunging down to the goal..."
  - Words: Romeyn Berry, Class of 1904
  - Music: Charles Edward Tourison, Class of 1906
  - Written: 1905
- Fight for Cornell – "From rocky height..."
  - Words: Kenneth Roberts, Class of 1908
  - Music: Theodore Julius Lindorff, Class of 1907
  - Written: 1906
- My Old Cornell – "Oh, I want to go back to the old days..."
  - Words: Will A. Dillon
  - Music: Will A. Dillon
  - Written: 1917
- Strike Up a Song to Cornell – "Strike up a song to Cornell..."
  - Words: Richard Henry Lee, Class of 1941
  - Music: Richard Henry Lee, Class of 1941
  - Written: 1940
- The Hill – "I wake at night and think I hear remembered chimes..."
  - Words: Albert William Smith, Class of 1878
  - Music: George Franklin Pond, Class of 1910
  - Written: 1921 (words), 1928 (music)
- Quarter Bells – "Once more. Once more I'm hurrying past the towers..."
  - Words: Anonymous, The Cornellian (Cornell Yearbook), 1900
  - Music: Robert Shapiro, Class of 2004
  - Written: 2004

== Performed in the past ==
These songs are no longer performed regularly.

- Cornell – "The soldier loves his gen'ral's fame..."
  - Words: George Kingsley Birge, Class of 1872
  - Music: James Power
  - Written: 1847 (music), 1869 (words)
- The Chimes – "To the busy morning light..."
  - Words: Francis Miles Finch
  - Music: George F. Root
  - Written: 1861 (music), 1869 (words)
- 1875 – "'Twas on a sunny summer morn..."
  - Words: John De Witt Warner, Class of 1872
  - Music: Archibald Croswell Weeks, Class of 1872
  - Written: 1875 (words), 1889 (music)
- Cornell Hymn – "Lo, at her feet the valley lies..."
  - Words: Albert William Smith, Class of 1878
  - Music: James Thomas Quarles
  - Written: 1905
- Carnelian and White – "Cornell colors are waving today..."
  - Words: Kenneth Roberts, Class of 1908
  - Music: Theodore Julius Lindorff, Class of 1907
  - Written: 1906
- Cornell Victorious – "From blue cayuga..."
  - Words: Silas Hibbard Ayer Jr., Class of 1914
  - Music: Silas Hibbard Ayer Jr., Class of 1914
  - Written: 1915
- Hail Thou in Majesty, Cornell – "Hail thou in majesty, Cornell..."
  - Words: Albert William Smith, Class of 1878
  - Music: George Franklin Pond, Class of 1910
  - Written: Unknown
- Tales of Old Cornell – "She stands upon her hill, serene..."
  - Words: Morris Gilbert Bishop, Class of 1914
  - Music: Ludwig F. Audrieth, Class of 1926
  - Written: 1928 (music)
- March On, Cornell – "Onward, Cornell, to the top where you belong..."
  - Words: Marcel Kleinert Sessler, Class of 1913
  - Music: Marcel Kleinert Sessler, Class of 1913
  - Written: 1936
- In the Red and the White – "In the red and the white..."
  - Words: Richard Henry Lee, Class of 1941
  - Music: Richard Henry Lee, Class of 1941
  - Written: 1939
- Cornell Champions – "Cornell champions are winning the game..."
  - Words: John Paul Timmerman Jr., Class of 1950
  - Music: John Paul Timmerman Jr., Class of 1950
  - Written: 1975

== See also ==
- Cornell University
- Cornell University Chorus
- Cornell Glee Club
- Fight song
