= Cornell University Glee Club =

US choir

- Seal of the Cornell University Glee Club

Background information
- Origin: Cornell University in Ithaca, New York, U.S.
- Genres: Choral, classical, etc.
- Years active: 1868–present
- Members: Director; Joe Lerangis
- Website: www.gleeclub.com

The Cornell University Glee Club (CUGC), founded in 1868, is the oldest student organization at Cornell University. The CUGC is a thirty-nine member chorus for tenor and bass voices, with repertoire including classical, folk, 20th-century music, and traditional Cornell songs. The Glee Club also performs major works with the Cornell University Chorus such as Beethoven's Missa Solemnis, Handel's Messiah, and Bach's Mass in B Minor.

== Achievements ==
- Performances at two American Choral Directors Association (ACDA) conventions as an auditioned choir: the 2008 ACDA Eastern Division Convention in Hartford, CT, and the 2009 ACDA National Convention in Oklahoma City, OK.
- First American collegiate ensemble to tour the Soviet Union, traveled to the Soviet Union and England from December 1960 to January 1961.^{:126}
- Performed for national television and radio on such networks as Television Moscow, BBC, Educational Television Network, Radio Leningrad, Frankfurt Radio Network, Television Singapura, PBS, NBC, and others. Notable appearances include: the Kate Smith TV Hour (1951), The Perry Como Show (1954), Garrison Keillor's A Prairie Home Companion (1997), and The Price Is Right (1999).
- Frequent domestic and international tours have traveled to over thirty-five states and nearly thirty countries across four continents.
- First group to bring the Franz Biebl Ave Maria' from Germany to the United States after meeting the composer during a recording session on the 1970 tour of Germany.
- Three month tour through East Asia in 1966 on an all-expense-paid tour sponsored by the U.S. State Department.
- 1989 tour of China was the focus of the PBS documentary Geographical Fugue.
- First published history of an American collegiate choral ensemble, Songs from the Hill: A History of the Cornell University Glee Club by Michael Slon, Class of 1992, was published in 1998.

== Directors ==
- 1889–1921: Hollis Ellsworth Dann
- 1921–1942: Eric Sydney Dudley
- 1942–1945: John Marinus Kuypers
- 1945–1946: Paul John Weaver
- 1946–1957: Thomas Brodhead Tracy '31
- 1957–1995: Thomas Andrew Sokol
- 1995–2012: Scott Arthur Tucker
- 2013–2020: Robert Isaacs
- 2022–present: Joe Lerangis

== International tours ==
The CUGC has performed as an ensemble in twenty-five countries.

- 1895 – England
- 1954 – Mexico
- 1960–1961 – Soviet Union and England
- 1963 – England
- 1966 – East Asia: Ceylon (now Sri Lanka), Singapore, Malaysia, Thailand, the Philippines, Hong Kong, Taiwan, Okinawa (now part of Japan), South Korea, and Japan
- 1970 – Germany
- 1972 – Eastern Europe: Germany, Austria, Czechoslovakia, Hungary, and Yugoslavia
- 1979 – England
- 1982 – England
- 1989 – Singapore, Hong Kong, and China: Shanghai and Beijing
- 1992 – France, Spain, and Switzerland
- 1993 – Great Lakes with visit to Toronto, Canada
- 2001 – Venezuela (with the Cornell University Chorus)
- 2004 – Brazil
- 2008 – China (with the Cornell University Chorus)
- 2012 – United Kingdom (England, Scotland, Wales)
- 2016 – Guatemala and Mexico (with the Cornell University Chorus)
- 2020 – Pacific Northwest with visits to Victoria and Vancouver, Canada (with the Cornell University Chorus)
- 2024 – Northeast United States with visit to Montreal, Canada (with the Cornell University Chorus)
- 2025 – Switzerland and Austria (with the Cornell University Chorus)

== Premieres ==
The Glee Club has given the world and American premieres of many works for male chorus, written by a variety of notable composers.

World premieres include works by:

- Maximilian Albrecht: Exsultet Sanctus (1962)
- Karel Husa: Festive Ode (1964), The Apotheosis of this Earth (1972, revised 1990)
- Robert Palmer: Nabuchodonosor Rex (1964)
- Ned Rorem: Laudemus Tempus Actum (1964)
- Juan Orrego-Salas: Cantata (1966)
- David Conte: Canticle (1982), Requiem Triptych (1983), Carmina Juventutis (1993), Crossing the Bar (2010)
- Steven Stucky: To Musick (2000)
- Joseph Gregorio: Dona Nobis Pacem (2003)
- Ernani Aguiar: Missa Brevis III (2004)
- Augusta Read Thomas: The Rewaking (2005)
- Julian Wachner: Four Scenes from the Rubaiyat (2006)
- Kay Rhie: Tears for Te Wano (2006)
- Chen Yi and Steven Stucky: Two Chinese Folk Songs (2007) (Joint commission with the Cornell Chorus for the 2008 China Tour)
- Bernard Rands: Trinity (2008)
- Benjamin May: Absalon, fili mi (2009)
- Daniel Kellogg: Innisfree (2009) and Winter Lullaby (2009)
- David Lefkowitz: Four Rubaiyat (2010)
- Roberto Sierra: Cantares (2015) (Joint commission with the Cornell Chorus for the university's sesquicentennial anniversary)
- Sydney Guillaume: Kanpe La (2016)
- Anders Edenroth: In the Beginning (2017)
- Brandon Waddles: God is a God (2026)

American premieres include works by:

- Carl Orff: Comoedeia de Christi Resurrectione (1962)
- Bohuslav Martinů: Prophecy of Isaiah (1968), Field Mass (1970)
- Anton Reicha: Te Deum (1974), Die Harmonie der Sphären (1974)

== Commissioning Endowment ==
In 2005, the Glee Club established the Thomas A. Sokol Commissioning Endowment in recognition of the 75th birthday of Director Emeritus Thomas Sokol. The proceeds help fund an annual commission from a well-known composer of a new work (or works), typically premiered by the Glee Club during the fall Homecoming weekend concert. Sokol Commission recipients to date include:

- Augusta Read Thomas: The Rewaking (2005)
- Julian Wachner: Four Scenes from the Rubaiyat (2006)
- Chen Yi and Steven Stucky: Two Chinese Folk Songs (2007) (Joint commission with the Cornell Chorus for the 2008 China Tour)
- Bernard Rands: Trinity (2008)
- Daniel Kellogg: Innisfree (2009) and Winter Lullaby (2009)
- David Lefkowitz: Four Rubaiyat (2010)
- Shulamit Ran: Sonnet 73 (2011)
- Alan Fletcher: I saw in Louisiana a Live-Oak Growing (2012)
- Toby Twining: Lincoln the Musician (2013)
- Christopher Cerrone: Not One Word (2014)
- Jens Klimek: Outstare the Stars (2015)
- Sydney Guillaume: Kanpe La (2016)
- Anders Edenroth: In the Beginning (2017)
- Julia Adolphe, Safiya Sinclair: Falling Water (2018)
- Daniel Reza Sabzghabaei: Omīd (2023)

== Recordings ==
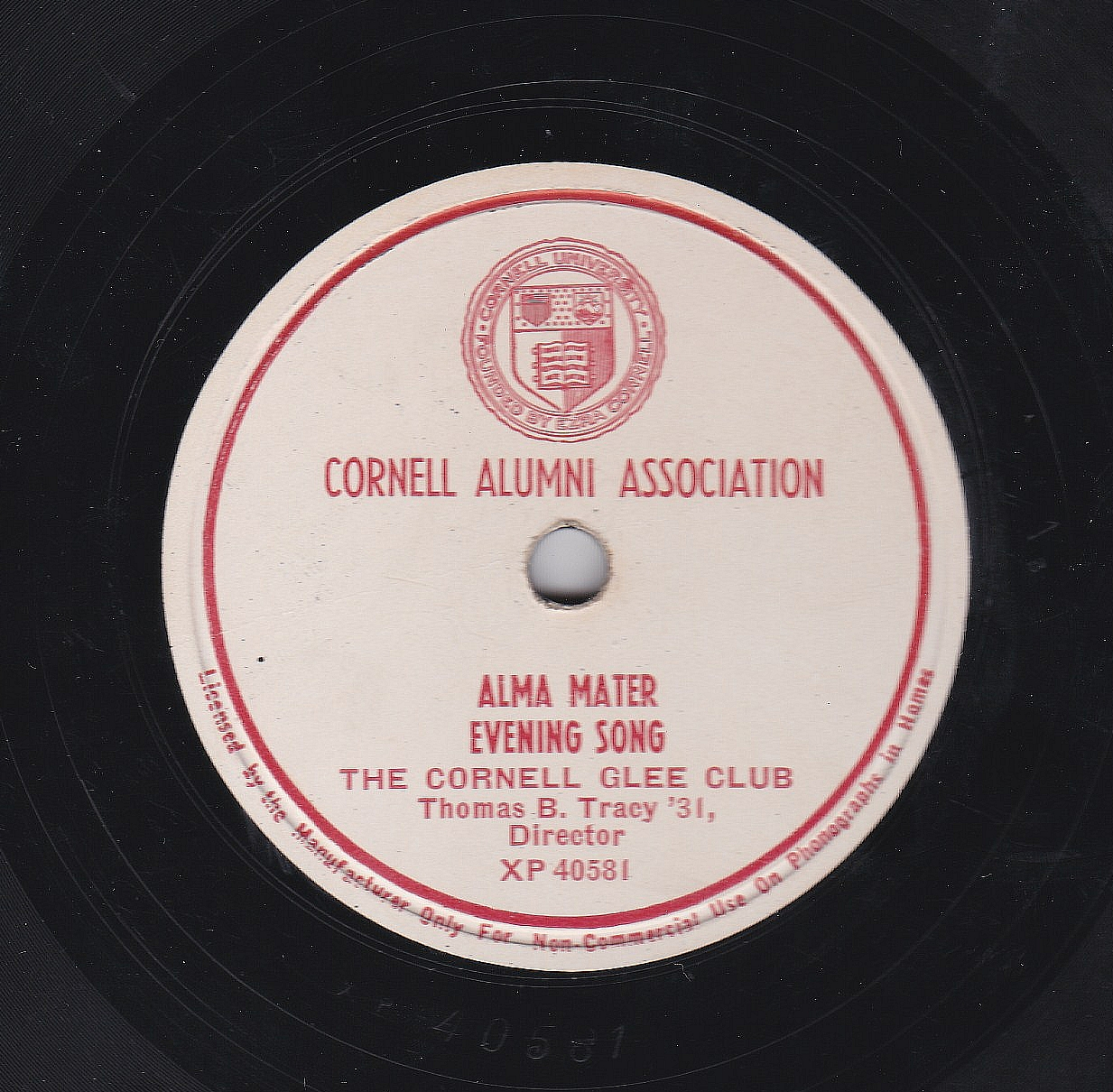
Record Label

- Alma Mater and Cornell, Columbia Phonograph Company No. A-1503, (1914, 78 RPM)
- Alma Mater and Crew Song (1929, 78 RPM), Victor Records No. 21934 – also includes orchestral selections
- Cornell Songs (1940, 3-disc set of 12" records) – includes two discs by the Glee Club and a third by the Chimes
- Cornell Alumni Association (c. 1946 – 1957, 78 RPM Maxi Single) – Includes four songs by Cornell Glee Club: "Alma Mater," "Evening Song," "Crew Song," and "Cornell." No date given. Thomas B. Tracy '31, Director. Matrix/Catalog #XP 40581 / XP 40582.
- Cornell Music (1950s, 33 RPM LP) – includes selections by Glee Club, Chimes, and Concert Band
  - During the 1950s, the Glee Club released recordings on a near-annual basis through the Cornell Recording Society.
- Songs of Cornell (19XX, 33 RPM LP)
- Songs of Cornell (19XX, compact disc)
- A Concert of Cathedral Music (1992, compact disc) – Recorded live during the 1992 Tour of Spain, France and Switzerland
- Echos From The Walls (1997, compact disc)
- Pacem (2006, compact disc)
- Last Letter Home (2011, compact disc and electronic release)
- Songs of Cornell (2015, compact disc – jointly with Cornell Chorus, featuring Cornell Symphony Orchestra and pianists Michael Slon and John Rowehl)

== Miscellaneous ==
=== The seal ===
Adopted as the official emblem of the Glee Club by Thomas A. Sokol shortly after he became director, the CUGC seal features the head of Apollo, the Greek god of music and poetry. It also recalls the well-known glee Glorious Apollo by Samuel Webbe.^{:261–262}

=== Quotes ===
"The excellent impression made by the 60 young men was of a finely finished vocalism from beginning to end of their a cappella program."

Robert P. Commanday, music critic of The San Francisco Chronicle from 1965 to 1993, in a San Francisco Classical Voice review of the Glee Club's performance at the San Francisco Conservatory of Music on January 8, 2011.

"Throw out all stereotypes. The Cornell University Glee Club has developed a virtuosic choral sound that has far more in common with the King's Singers than 40 guys with a keg."

Alfred Thigpen of The Washington Postin a review of the Glee Club's performance at the Kennedy Center in Washington, D.C., on January 9, 2010.

"I want to send you my heartiest congratulations on your superb singing...I do not exaggerate when I say you made choral history, and I hope sincerely that before long we can again make music together."

Eugene Ormandy, in a letter to the Glee Club and Chorus, after conducting a performance of Beethoven's Ninth Symphony by the Glee Club, Chorus, and Philadelphia Orchestra on October 9th and 10th, 1962.^{:130}

"This is the most exciting moment in my eight years as Governor of New York."

Nelson Rockefeller after hearing Beethoven's Ninth Symphony performed by the Cornell Glee Club, Chorus, and the Philadelphia Orchestra under the direction of Eugene Ormandy for the opening of the Saratoga Performing Arts Center, August 4, 1966.^{:131}

== A cappella subsets ==
=== The Hangovers ===
The Hangovers, established in 1968, have been the official a cappella subset of the Glee Club for over forty years. The Hangovers' repertoire consists mainly of popular songs arranged for a cappella by members and alumni of the group, but they also perform traditional Cornell songs, as well as selections from the Glee Club repertoire on occasion.

The Hangovers have two major on-campus concerts every year, one in the Fall and one in the late Spring. The Fall concert has been named Fall Tonic since 1980, while the spring concert (produced since 1993) is known as Happy Hour.

Performances and tours take place around campus, around the country, and around the world. These efforts are undertaken in addition to the performances and travels that Hangovers members are also involved in as members of the Glee Club (see above). The Hangovers' first solo tour was to Bermuda in 1971, with subsequent tours undertaken to Antigua, Belgium, France, Germany, the Netherlands, Italy, Jamaica, Japan, Korea, Mexico, Spain, and Switzerland. The ensemble also records periodically, and has released thirteen albums.

=== Earlier subset history ===
Prior to The Hangovers, the Glee Club spawned several spinoff a cappella subsets in the second half of the 20th century as collegiate a cappella emerged as a popular form of music.

- Cayuga's Waiters (1949–1956)
  - disassociated from Glee Club in 1956; existed independently through 2017
- The Sherwoods (1956–1958)
  - removed from Glee Club in 1958; existed independently through 1973
  - alumni often perform during Cornell Reunions weekend
- Glee Club Eight / Glee Club Octaves (1958–1966)
- The Hangovers (1968–present)
  - continue to tour and perform within the CUGC and separately as the official a cappella subset
- Leftovers (1971–1972)
  - merged with The Hangovers in 1972

==== The Sherwoods ====
First appearing at the Glee Club's 1956 fall concert, The Sherwoods of Cornell gained prominence quickly among collegiate musical groups. They took their name from Sherwood B. "Woody" Bliss, Cornell class of 1958. They embarked on their first international tour in the summer of 1957 (with an itinerary including Hawaii and the Far East) and by 1958, they were a successful act in great demand both on and off campus.^{:242} This enormous success came at a price, however, and led to conflicts with the Glee Club, which had nominally remained The Sherwoods' parent organization during these formative years. In the fall of 1958, the two organizations split officially. Glee Club director Thomas Sokol later recalled that The Sherwoods had been "twelve of [his] best singers," and that losing them was a difficult—but necessary—step for both organizations.^{:242}

The Sherwoods toured extensively, traveling to Hawaii, the Far East, Bermuda, the Virgin Islands, and Jamaica and on two extensive tours for the USO, entertaining troops in the Philippines, and throughout Germany (1964). They commonly wore dark (Sherwood) green jackets and ties for performances. Rather than sing stock arrangements, The Sherwoods wrote their own. They were known for rich 6–8 part harmony music unique among other a cappella groups of their time. Four members accounted for most of their arrangements: Jack Wade '58, Frank Holden '62, Fred Kewley '65, and Dan Murray '70 whose arrangements are numerous on the final Sherwood LP, "Green" (1971). Holden (resident of Duxbury, MA) and Kewley (a manager of music professionals in Nashville, TN) are now both music directors for two large groups of alumni Sherwoods they call "The Founders" (singers from classes of '58–'63) and "The Youngers" (singers from classes of '64–'74). Kewley succumbed to pancreatic cancer on June 23, 2013. Eighteen of his Sherwoods traveled to Nashville, TN to join family and friends in a memorial service to honor him. Taking Kewley's place as Sherwoods music director is David Hunter '68. Ron Johnson '68 continues on as business manager. The group intends to continue singing at Cornell's annual reunion each June, and elsewhere, upon demand.

The popularity of a cappella singing faded for a period in the early 1970s and The Sherwoods stopped auditioning new members in 1973. 1973 also marked the final year in which the Sherwoods were featured in The Cornellian, Cornell University's annual year book.^{:242}

In 1985 The Class of '65 invited the 'Younger' Sherwoods back to Cornell to entertain them at their 20th reunion. It was the first time in twenty years The Youngers had met to re-learn their songs and practice their entertaining introductions. The 'Younger' Sherwoods have been returning to Cornell's Ithaca campus to perform at reunions every year since 1985, celebrating their 26th annual shows in 2010, once again entertaining the Class of '65, this time at the class's 45th reunion.^{:242}

The 'Founders' Sherwoods gather at various times during the year, continuing to practice and perform the repertoire they sang during their era at Cornell. Between the two Sherwoods groups there are about 45 active Sherwood singers performing today.

The Sherwoods released seven albums during their undergraduate years; more recently they have produced two re-mastered compilation CDs entitled "Try to Remember – The Reunion Album" and "Old Friends". The Sherwoods continue to look for opportunities to perform. Business manager is Ron Johnson '68 of Hingham, MA.

Noted hit singer/songwriter Harry Chapin sang with the Sherwoods for several years, writing two songs performed by the group, 'Let me Down Easy' and 'Winter Song'. As an undergraduate, Chapin was preoccupied with his prolific songwriting, and he eventually dropped out of Cornell University to focus on his early career as a successful singer-songwriter. In 1971 Fred Kewley, Sherwood musical director, became Chapin's manager through the best years of his career, from landing the recording contract with Elektra through his hits Taxi, WOLD, and Cats In The Cradle, etc., and the hundreds of concerts around the US and Europe his music spawned.

== Notable CUGC alumni ==
- John Cranford Adams – Class of 1926 – Second president of Hofstra University; founder of Hofstra William Shakespeare Festival
- Robert B. Aird – Class of 1926 – president of Deep Springs College; founder of UC San Francisco Department of Neurology
- R. Alexander Anderson – Class of 1916 – prolific Hawaiian composer with nearly 200 songs to his credit, including Lovely Hula Hands, Coconut Island, and the popular Hawaiian Christmas song, Mele Kalikimaka
- Neal Dow Becker – Class of 1905 – Chairman of the Cornell University Board of Trustees (1947–1953)
- Bruce Boyce – Class of 1933 – celebrated Canadian operatic baritone; professor at Royal Academy of Music in London
- Ivan Dresser – Class of 1919 – gold medalist in the 3000 meter track & field event at the 1920 Olympic Games
- Houston I. Flournoy – Class of 1950 – California legislator and State Controller
- Louis Agassiz Fuertes – Class of 1897 – ornithologist and painter
- Henry Guerlac - Class of 1932 – award-winning science historian, author, and educator
- Stephen J. Hadley – Class of 1969 – U.S. national security advisor
- Alan Keyes – Class of 1972 (transferred to Harvard University) – politician, diplomat, and U.S. presidential candidate
- Austin H. Kiplinger – Class of 1939 – former chairman of the Cornell University Board of Trustees; head of the Kiplinger publishing dynasty for 30 years
- Knight Kiplinger – Class of 1969 – journalist; editor-in-chief of Kiplinger publishing dynasty
- John S. Knight – Class of 1918 – newspaper magnate whose papers garnered twenty-six Pulitzer Prizes during his tenure as chairman of what is now Knight Ridder; namesake of John S. Knight Institute for Writing in the Disciplines at Cornell University
- Frank Morgan – Class of 1912 – film and Broadway actor; played the Wizard in the film The Wizard of Oz
- George Ashton Oldham – Class of 1902 – major religious leader in U.S.; third Bishop of the Episcopal Diocese of Albany (1929–1950)
- Michael B. Polk – Class of 1982 – CEO of Newell Brands
- John Wellborn Root Jr. – Class of 1909 – architect of Chicago Board of Trade and Chicago Daily News buildings, among others
- Dave Ross - Class of 1973 – talk show host on Seattle's KIRO-FM radio station; political commentator on the CBS Radio Network
- Frederick Fuller Russell – Class of 1891 – credited with perfecting and employing the first typhoid vaccination on a large scale as a commissioned officer in the U.S. Army Medical Corps
- Basil Ruysdael – Class of 1899 – actor in Blackboard Jungle; announcer on Your Hit Parade; played Andrew Jackson in Disney's Davy Crockett; vocal teacher of Lawrence Tibbett
- Julian H. Steward – Class of 1925 – anthropologist; developed scientific theory of cultural evolution
- Myron Charles Taylor – Class of 1894 – Cornell University trustee; businessman and diplomat
- Tat Tong – Class of 2004 – award-winning Singaporean record producer and songwriter
- Allan H. Treman – Class of 1921 – lawyer and Cornell University trustee
- Robert H. Treman – Class of 1878 – first of the Treman family to attend Cornell; Cornell University trustee for forty-six years, one of the longest terms in its history; philanthropist; gave land for Treman State Parks; second oldest member of the Cornell University Athletic Hall of Fame; president of Cornell University Alumni Association
- Hugh C. Troy Jr. – Class of 1926 – painter and prankster
- Jonathan Wong Chee-Hynn – Class of 2008 – Hong Kong singer-songwriter and actor

== See also ==
- List of Cornell Songs
