= Canti del Sole =

Song cycle written by Bernard Rands

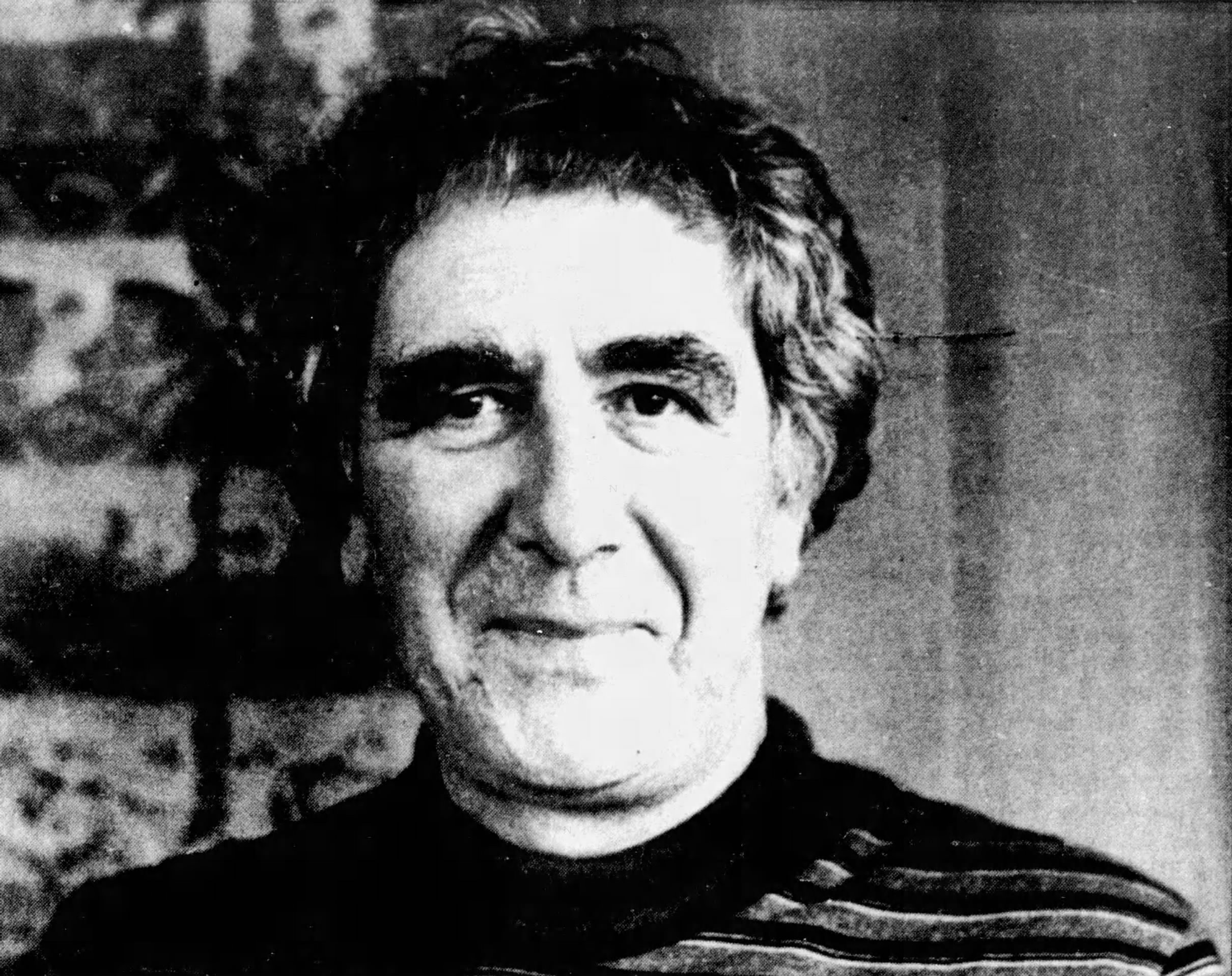
- Bernard Rands in 1983
- English: Songs of the Sun
- Form: Song cycle
- Commissioned by: New York Philharmonic
- Performed: 8 June 1983: Avery Fisher Hall

Canti del Sole (Songs of the Sun) is a song cycle written by the British-American composer Bernard Rands. The music exists in two arrangements: one for tenor and orchestra and the other for tenor and chamber ensemble. The orchestral version was commissioned by the New York Philharmonic and was first performed by the tenor Paul Sperry and the New York Philharmonic under the direction of Zubin Mehta at Avery Fisher Hall on June 8, 1983. Canti del Sole is the second of Rands's "Canti" trilogy, preceded by Canti Lunatici for soprano (1981) and followed by Canti dell’Eclisse for bass (1992). The piece was awarded the 1984 Pulitzer Prize for Music.

== Structure ==
Canti del Sole has a performance duration of approximately 25 minutes and cast in 14 short movements based on various poems from around the world:

1. "Mattina" (Giuseppe Ungaretti)
2. "The Dawn Verse" (D. H. Lawrence)
3. from "The Masque of the Twelve Months" (anonymous, 12th Century)
4. from "Soleil et Chair" (Arthur Rimbaud)
5. "Portami il girasole" (Eugenio Montale)
6. from "Vision and Prayer" (Dylan Thomas)
7. "Frutteto" (Leonardo Sinisgalli)
8. "Futility" (Wilfred Owen)
9. "September" (Peter Huchel)
10. "November by the Sea" (D. H. Lawrence)
11. "Fadensonnen" (Paul Celan)
12. "Harmonie du Soir" (Charles Baudelaire)
13. "The Sunset Verse" (D. H. Lawrence)
14. "Ed è Subito Sera" (Salvatore Quasimodo)

== Reception ==
Andrew Mellor of Gramophone wrote, "Canti del Sole is a continuous journey through 14 poems, in two sets of seven, which chart the progress of a day from dawn to dusk. The poems, in four languages, are mostly from the Romantic big guns and while that brings the feeling of a patchwork, the music urges its way through any residual incongruity. [...] the piece grows ever more musically and philosophically complex before fading and disappearing."
