= Flynn–Aird syndrome =

- Flynn–Aird syndrome has an autosomal dominant pattern of inheritance.

Flynn–Aird syndrome is a rare, hereditary, neurological disease that is inherited in an autosomal dominant fashion. The syndrome involves defects in the nervous, auditory, skeletal, visual, and endocrine systems and encompasses numerous symptoms, bearing striking similarity to other known syndromes of neuroectodermal nature such as: Werner syndrome, Cockayne syndrome and Refsum syndrome.

The onset of Flynn–Aird syndrome typically occurs between ten and twenty years of age, however, the earliest case was diagnosed at age seven. As the syndrome progresses, initial symptoms tend to intensify and new symptoms become apparent. Unlike related syndromes and despite the intensity of symptoms in the disease progression, Flynn–Aird syndrome does not appear to shorten life expectancy. The disease is characterized by early-onset dementia, ataxia, muscle wasting, skin atrophy, and eye abnormalities. In addition, patients have the potential of developing a number of other related symptoms such as: cataracts, retinitis pigmentosa, myopia (nearsightedness), dental caries, peripheral neuropathy (peripheral nerve damage), deafness, and cystic bone changes. This syndrome was first discovered in the early 1950s by American neurologists P. Flynn and Robert B. Aird who analyzed one family lineage inheritance pattern of this disease.

== Symptoms and signs ==
Individuals with this syndrome typically develop normally until reaching the second decade of their lives but the onset of symptoms has been observed as early as age seven. The first defect observed in individuals who have this condition affects the auditory system and is known as bilateral nerve deafness. Another early symptom is the development of myopia (nearsightedness). In addition to bilateral nerve deafness and myopia, other symptoms that plague infected individuals early in disease progression include ataxia, muscle wasting, severe peripheral neuritic pain sometimes accompanied by elevated spinal fluid protein, and joint stiffness.

The central nervous system (CNS) is affected with deficits in the cerebral cortex which indicate signs of mental retardation even though psychological observations appear relatively normal for individuals studied. Atypical epilepsy is also a common feature of CNS malfunctioning including aphasia expressions, blurred vision, and numbness of the face and limbs.

In the third decade of the condition, individuals develop further visual problems including retinitis pigmentosa, and bilateral cataracts. Affected individuals experience the restriction of visual fields, night blindness, and eventually severe or complete blindness. Individuals with this syndrome exhibit many physical deformities including skeletal, epidermal, and subcutaneous abnormalities. The skeletal problems are characterized by scoliosis and muscle weakness indicative of the kyphoscoliotic type which follow muscle wasting and peripheral neuritis (nerve inflammation). Osteoporosis is also observed in many cases. Skin and subcutaneous atrophy is common as well as skin ulcerations due to inability of the skin to heal. One of the final manifestations of disease is baldness. There is no evidence that the progression of Flynn–Aird syndrome shortens the patient's life-span, but the terrible conditions certainly increase morbidity.

== Genetics ==
One family of 68 individuals over 5 generations was studied and the prevalence of disease among the family members suggests that it is indicative of dominant inheritance that is not sexually linked. This is supported by the fact that the disease failed to skip generations even in the absence of intermarriages and that disease incidence was independent of sex. The current findings suggest that the cause of the disease could be narrowed down to one enzymatic defect that is involved in the development of neuroectodermal tissue, however the exact molecular mechanisms are currently unknown. The other symptoms that arise such as bone defects and diabetes may be secondary to this enzymatic defect.

== Pathophysiology ==
The exact pathophysiological mechanism of Flynn–Aird syndrome is unknown. However, several theories are in place with regards to the nature of this disease including the presence of a genetically defective enzyme involving a neuroectodermal tissue constituent. This explanation provides evidence for the late onset of the condition, the intricate findings, the varied nature of the disorder, as well as the genetic incidence. In addition, some aspects of the condition may be linked to a suppressing (S) gene due to the fact that only a small amount of stigmata appeared while the defects were still transmitted in the family studied. A suppressing gene down regulates the phenotypic expression of another gene, especially of a mutant gene. Other abnormalities may be due to endocrine system diseases.

== History ==
P. Flynn and Robert B. Aird observed this neuroectodermal syndrome after studying one family whose members had a number of neurological symptoms that were consistent from generation to generation. A number of the symptoms overlapped with several known neurological diseases such as Werner syndrome, Refsum syndrome, and Cockayne syndrome, which could be indicative of similar causative origins. However, these syndromes are recessively inherited as opposed to the dominant inheritance seen in the family studied by P. Flynn and Robert B. Aird. About 15% of family members exhibited full-blown symptoms characteristic of the disease while others showed some symptoms that overlapped with the general clinical manifestation of the syndrome.
