= Robert B. Aird =

American educator

Robert Burns Aird
- Born: November 5, 1903
- Died: January 28, 2000 (aged 96)
- Citizenship: American
- Occupations: educator, neurologist, epileptologist

Robert Burns Aird (5 November 1903 – 28 January 2000) was an American educator, neurologist and epileptologist.

Aird's father, Dr. John Aird, founded Provo General Hospital in Provo, Utah, with two other doctors, Dr. Fred W. Taylor and George E. Robison, in 1903. The hospital was the first general hospital in Utah County. In 1923 the partnership broke up and Dr. John Aird continued operating the hospital under the name of the Aird Hospital from 1923 until 1939, when the Utah Valley Hospital was opened. Robert Aird's grandfather and grandmother, William Aird and Elizabeth McLean, were Scottish immigrants and the family was proud of its heritage, thus the name "Robert Burns" Aird, after the famous Scottish poet. His uncle, Henry McLean Aird, was a prominent educator in Utah.

After being educated at Deep Springs College, Aird was awarded a Telluride undergraduate residential scholarship at Cornell University. Following postgraduate training at Harvard Medical School, Aird worked first as a neurosurgeon and then as a neurologist at the University of California at San Francisco (UCSF). He was made the first chair when the Department of Neurology was created in 1949 and was professor and chair until his retirement in 1966.

In addition to conducting his own research (Flynn Aird syndrome bears his name), Aird developed the department into a leading academic center for the study of the brain sciences, drawing future Nobel laureate Stanley Prusiner as a resident late during Aird's tenure. From 1958 to 1959 he served as president of the American Epilepsy Society (AES) and received its Lennox Award in 1970.

Aird wrote a history of modern neurology and coauthored 2 textbooks on epilepsy.

A lifelong musician, Aird was president of the Cornell University Glee Club as an undergraduate, and during his tenure as neurology chairman at UCSF wrote a musical about the life of Joshua A. Norton (ca. 1815-1880), the mentally ill self-proclaimed Emperor of the United States and Mexico.
