= Ave Maria (Biebl) =

Choral composition by Franz Biebl

- Sacred motet by Franz Biebl
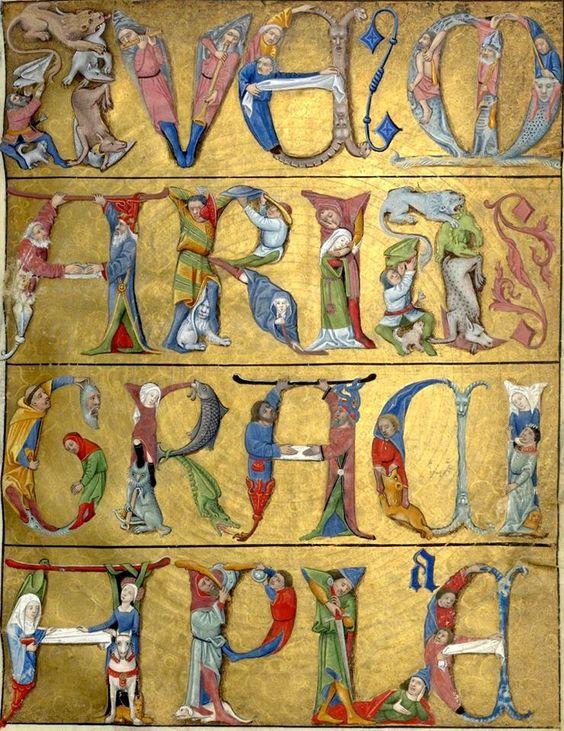
- Ave Maria from the Heures de Charles d'Angoulême
- Key: C major or B flat major
- Text: Angelus
- Language: Latin
- Published: 1964
- Scoring: Double choir (different arrangements)

Ave Maria is a 1964 motet by Franz Biebl, composed for double choir, a large four-part choir and a three-part choir which can be performed by soloists. It is a setting of part of the Latin liturgical Angelus prayer, which contains the Ave Maria (Hail Mary) as a refrain. The composition was originally written for men's chorus, but the composer wrote arrangements for mixed and women's choirs. The work and arrangements were published by Wildt's Musikverlag, first in 1964. The piece first became famous when a U.S. group, the Cornell University Glee Club, included it in their Christmas programs, and more famous when the Chanticleer ensemble made it part of their regular repertoire. It was published in the U.S. by Hinshaw and became one of the publisher's best-selling items.

== History ==
Biebl was the organist and choir master of a parish in Fürstenfeldbruck, Bavaria, and of a men's chorus there, for which he composed many works and arrangements. He composed Ave Maria sometime before May 1959, when it was performed in a Maiandacht. It was written for men's chorus, and this version was published by Wildt's Musikverlag in 1964. However, it was not performed often, since German men's choirs generally did not perform religious music. On a 1970 tour in Germany, the Cornell University Glee Club from the U.S. met Biebl, who was working for the broadcaster Bayerischer Rundfunk and responsible for choral music. Conductor Thomas A. Sokol received several of Biebl's compositions, which he performed in the U.S. When the Chanticleer vocal ensemble made Ave Maria part of their repertoire, it gained popularity. They first performed it in a charity event on 4 December 1989 at the City Hall in San Francisco, then presented it in subsequent Christmas concerts and included it in their tour program the next year. The work is now considered a standard of the choral repertoire.

Biebl wrote two arrangements for mixed choir in 1985 and women's choir 1998. It was published in the U.S. by Hinshaw Music in 1992, and became one of the publisher's best-selling items, the four versions selling over 670,000 copies between 1992 and 2016.

== Text ==
The text is the beginning of the Latin Catholic liturgical Angelus prayer, three verses based on biblical sources, with the Ave Maria as a refrain. In Biebl's setting, the Ave Maria refrain contains only the first half of the Ave Maria prayer, the benediction of Mary and the fruit of her womb, Jesus. The second half, praying for Mary's intercession, is delivered as a conclusion, deviating slightly from the liturgical text by addressing Mary as Holy Mother twice, asking firstly for intercession with "us sinners", and secondly for "in the hour of our death", while the Ave Maria prayer combines both requests in one. The prayer is closed by Amen.

Latin

Angelus Domini nuntiavit Mariae
et concepit de Spiritu Sancto.

Ave Maria, gratia plena,
Dominus tecum,
benedicta tu in mulieribus,
et benedictus fructus ventris tui, Jesus.

Maria dixit:
Ecce ancilla Domini
Fiat mihi secundum verbum tuum.

Ave Maria ...

Et verbum caro factum est
Et habitavit in nobis.

Ave Maria ...

Sancta Maria, mater Dei,
ora pro nobis peccatoribus.
Sancta Maria, ora pro nobis
nunc et in hora mortis nostrae.
Amen.

English

The Angel of the Lord announced to Mary
And she conceived by the Holy Spirit.

Hail Mary, full of grace,
the Lord is with thee:
blessed art thou amongst women,
and blessed is the Fruit of thy womb, Jesus.

Mary said:
Behold the handmaiden of the Lord.
Do to me according to your word.

Hail Mary ...

And the Word was made flesh
And dwelt among us.

Hail Mary ...

Holy Mary, Mother of God,
pray for us sinners.
Holy Mary, Mother of God,
pray for us now and at the hour of our death.
Amen.

== Music ==
The original composition was in D major for men's choir, with a TTBB choir and a TTB trio. When it was published, it was transposed to C major. The verses from the Angelus are recited by one voice in chant-like fashion in free tempo. The refrain is sung by the choirs, with the four-part choir beginning and the three-part choir following one measure later, in an alternating pattern kept throughout the piece. The final choral setting, Sancta Maria, is intensified in vocal range and dynamics, concluding in Amen set in a similar pattern. The choral singing is marked once at the beginning "Ruhig fließend" (Quietly flowing), in common time. The choirs operate in different rhythm: the four-part choir begins with three quarter-notes towards a long note in the second measure, while the three-part choir begins on the first beat in measure two.

Biebl wrote arrangements for SATB choir/SAT trio (in B flat major), TTBB choir/SAA choir, and SSAA choir/SSA trio.

== Program note ==
Wilbur Skeels – who published some of Biebl's other works – prepared the following information about the piece for use in choral program notes. All or parts of the information in this note are commonly cited by choirs recording or performing the piece.

Herr Biebl told me that when he was organist/choirmaster and teacher in the Fürstenfeldbruck parish near Munich he had in his church choir a fireman. It was common for companies, factories, police and fire departments, etc. to sponsor an employees' choir, which often would participate in choral competitions and festivals with other similar choirs. This fireman asked Biebl to please compose something for his fireman's choir for such an occasion. The result was the Ave Maria (double male choir version).

The piece gained practically no attention in Germany for many years. However, when Biebl was the head of choral programs for the Bayerischen Rundfunk (Bavarian Radio) he made a habit of inviting American choirs to come to Munich and sing on the radio and with other German choirs. One of these choirs was introduced to his Ave Maria and brought it back to the US, where it became increasingly popular. When Chanticleer recorded it, it became a hit, not only in the US but in Germany too, which now considered the piece must be special as it was such a hit in America.

The source of the text is the thrice-daily devotional exercise called the Angelus in the Catholic Church. It is cued by the ringing of the "Angelus" bell, sometimes referred to as the "Peace Bell." It consists of a thrice-repeated "Hail Mary," each with an introductory versicle based on the Gospel, followed by a concluding versicle and prayer.

Biebl uses the source text of the traditional Angelus nearly exactly, adding the words "Maria dixit" to the beginning of the second versicle, and omitting the second half of the first two Hail Mary's.

The text sung in Biebl's composition is as follows:

Angelus Domini nuntiavit Mariae
The Angel of the Lord announced to Mary

Et concepit de Spiritu Sancto.
And she conceived by the Holy Spirit.

[Ave Maria, gratia plena, Dominus tecum, benedicta tu in mulieribus, et benedictus fructus ventris tui, Jesus.]
[Hail Mary, full of grace, the Lord is with Thee; blessed art thou among women, and blessed is the fruit of thy womb, Jesus.]

Maria dixit:
Mary said:

Ecce ancilla Domini
Behold the handmaiden of the Lord

Fiat mihi secundum verbum tuum.
Do to me according to your word.

[Ave Maria, gratia plena, Dominus tecum, benedicta tu in mulieribus, et benedictus fructus ventris tui, Jesus.]
[Hail Mary, full of grace, the Lord is with Thee; blessed art thou among women, and blessed is the fruit of thy womb, Jesus.]

Et verbum caro factum est
And the Word was made flesh

Et habitavit in nobis
And dwelt among us.

[Ave Maria, gratia plena, Dominus tecum, benedicta tu in mulieribus, et benedictus fructus ventris tui, Jesus.]
[Hail Mary, full of grace, the Lord is with Thee; blessed art thou among women, and blessed is the fruit of thy womb, Jesus.]

[Sancta Maria, Mater Dei, ora pro nobis peccatoribus nunc et in hora mortis nostrae. Amen.]
[Holy Mary, Mother of God, pray for us sinners now and at the hour of our death. Amen.]

According to normal practice in classical sacred composition, Biebl has not set the text of the closing versicle and prayer of the 'Angelus' to music.

== Instrumental arrangements ==
The San Francisco Renegades and the Phantom Regiment Drum and Bugle Corps arranged the work for brass band. Specifically, the San Francisco Renegades, an all-age Drum and Bugle Corps, first adapted sections of Biebl's Ave Maria in their 2003 show: "Red Skies At Night". In 2005 they played the piece as the opener to their show, "The Days of Future Past". In 2006 the Phantom Regiment Drum and Bugle Corps, an International World Class Corps based in Rockford, Illinois, used the piece in its 2006 field show "Faust," further expanding awareness of Biebl's arrangement. Both drum and bugle corps continue to perform Franz Biebl's Ave Maria as part of their yearly repertoire.

Several transcriptions and arrangements of the Biebl "Ave Maria" have been written since 2010. One transcription is by Jerry Brubaker, horn player and arranger for 30 years with the US Navy Band, done after hearing the piece sung at a Navy funeral. It has been performed by the Navy Band horn section and the NIH Community Orchestra Horn Club on numerous occasions. In 2018 Triplo Press of Minneapolis, Minnesota, published an arrangement of the work by James Olcott for 12 trumpets.

Pacific Crest Drum and Bugle Corps uses Franz Biebl's Ave Maria as their corps song.

== US First Amendment litigation ==
In 2009–10, an arrangement of the Ave Maria for wind ensemble was the subject of litigation that reached the United States Supreme Court. At issue was whether a school district was justified in prohibiting an instrumental performance of the piece (without lyrics) at a high school graduation ceremony due to its underlying religious nature. The United States Court of Appeals for the Ninth Circuit upheld the school district's actions. The Supreme Court declined to hear the case, but Justice Samuel Alito issued a rare written opinion dissenting from the Court's decision. In a footnote, Alito described Biebl's setting of the Ave Maria text as "relatively obscure" in comparison to settings by Franz Schubert, Charles Gounod, and other more well-known composers.
