= Sydney Guillaume =

Haitian-American composer

- Born: July 22, 1982 (age 43); Port-Au-Prince, Haiti
- Genres: Contemporary Classical
- Occupations: Composer and conductor
- Years active: 2006–present
- Website: sydneyguillaume.com

Sydney Guillaume (born 1982) is a Haitian-American composer of contemporary classical music. He is known primarily for his choral compositions.

== Early life and education ==
Sydney Guillaume was born in 1982 in Port-au-Prince, Haiti. His father, Gabriel Guillaume, is a poet. His mother's name is Marlene. He has two older brothers. Sydney Guillaume began piano lessons at the age of 6. He and his family moved to Miami in 1994 to escape civil instability. He began composing and singing choir in school. Guillaume credits Morten Lauridsen as an early influence. He won a piano scholarship from the Caribbean Music Club at the age of 17.

At the University of Miami, Guillaume studied composition with an emphasis on media writing and production. Guillaume was encouraged in composition by Jo-Michael Scheibe. Guillaume graduated in 2004.

== Career ==
At university, although Guillaume originally wanted to write for film scores, a piece that he composed for the school choir, Calinda, attracted the attention of choral directors who started to commission him for works. Seraphic Fire commissioned Guillaume for a piece, Dominus Vobiscum, which premiered in 2007.

Guillaume moved to Los Angeles on or before 2007, where he composed music for films and documentaries for Loyola Productions. In 2013, Guillaume formed a touring sextet where he is conductor and writer.

On or before 2019, Guillaume moved to Portland, Oregon. In 2023, the Portland-based Choral Arts Ensemble performed a concert dedicated to Guillaume's music. Guillaume wrote "A Taste of Freedom," an orchestral and choral piece, with Lloyd Reshard, Jr., which debuted in 2023.

== Musical style ==
Guillaume's choral compositions start with an existing text. Frequently Sydney Guillaume collaborates with his father, Gabriel Guillaume. Many song texts are written in Haitian Creole. Guillaume names Haitian roots music as an inspiration for his work, including the band Boukman Eksperyans, who uses both traditional Haitian rhythms and electric guitar.

Patrick Dupré Quigley said in 2007 that Guillaume's music combined the formal classical form with Caribbean harmonies and rhythms in a genuine way. Patrick De Lyser, musical director of the Choral Arts Ensemble, said "His music is very well-crafted, very rhythmic, sometimes unexpectedly complex and yet accessible as well, so it connects with singers and audience."

Guillaume stated that it is important for him to write parts that are interesting for every voice part and instrument.

== Works ==
=== Choral works ===
- Kalinda, SSAATTBB (2002, published with Walton Music)
- Pour Toi, Mère, SSAATTBB with piano accompaniment (2003)
- Anmwe, SSAATTBB a cappella with soprano solo (2005)
- Touched in Love, SATB with piano accompaniment (2005, published with Colla Voce Music)
- Men Nou SSA with piano accompaniment (2006)
- St. Francis de Sales Mass, SATB with organ (2006/2008)
- Dominus Vobiscum, SATB a cappella (2007, published with Walton Music)
- Twa Tanbou, SATB a cappella (2007, published with Walton Music)
- Koudjay, SSA a cappella (2007, published with Walton Music)
- Mama Afrika, SSAATTBB and percussion (2008, published with Walton Music)
- Wipip!!!, SATB a cappella (2008, published with Santa Barbara Music Publishing)
- Lakay, SSA and orchestra (2008)
- Ego Sum, SSAATTBB a cappella (2009, published with Walton Music)
- Peyi Mwen, arranged for SA with flute and piano accompaniment (2010)
- Au-delà du Chagrin, SATBB a cappella (2010, published with Walton Music)
- Diplomasi, SATB with divisi a cappella (2010)
- N ap Debat, TTBB with drums (2010)
- Kinalaganach, SSATB with brass quartet and drum (2010)
- Fèt Chanpèt, SATB with drums (2010)
- Ayiti (Lesklavaj / Delivrans / Pèseverans), SATB and baritone solo with percussion (2011)
- Plakatap, SSA with percussion (2011)
- La Providence, SSA a cappella (2011)
- Tap-Tap, SATB a cappella (2011)
- Te Deum, SATBB a cappella (2011)
- Le Dernier Voyage, SSAATTBB a cappella (2012)
- Chapo Pou Fanm, SSAA a cappella (2011)
- Gagòt, TTBB a cappella (2013)
- Blogodop, SATB with drums (2013)
- Akeem, SSA and piano, string quartet, or string orchestra (2014)
- Nou Se Limyè, SATB with piano accompaniment (2014)
- Yon Monn Nouvo, SA and SATB with piano and percussion (2014)
- Kanaval, SATB or SSAA with percussion (2015)
- Musique, SA and SATB with piano accompaniment (2015)
- Kanpe La, TTBB a cappella (2016)
- Dilèm, SSA with woodwind quintet (2016)
- Tchaka, SATB with percussion (2016)
- Ranpono, SATB a cappella (2016)
- Ansanm Ansanm, SATB with conga drum (2017)
- Alleluia Amen, SATB double choir a cappella (2018)
- Réfugié, Mon Frère, SSA with piano accompaniment and optional string quartet (2018)
- Renmen Renmen, TTBB a cappella (2019)
- Leve Kanpe, SATB with percussion (2019)
- Ay'bobo Pou Yo, SATB with percussion (2020)
- Kouraj, SATB with percussion (2020)
- Finding a Home, SATB with percussion (2020)
- C'est Beau La Vie, SATB a cappella (2022)
- Nou La, SATB and soprano solo (2022)
- This, Too, Shall Pass, SATB with piano accompaniment (2022)
- G on Jan Pou Ye, SATB with percussion (2023)
- A Taste of Freedom, SATB with orchestra (2023)
- Douce Espérance, SATB divisi a cappella (2023)
- I Will Not Look Away, TTBB with piano accompaniment (2024)

=== Large ensemble works ===
- Lakay, SSA chorus and orchestra (2008)
- Akeem, SSA chorus and string orchestra (2014)
- Renesans, for wind ensemble (2019)
- Lavil Okap, for orchestra (2020)
- A Taste of Freedom, SATB chorus and orchestra (2023)

=== Chamber works ===
- Lago, for woodwind quintet (2004)
- Lespwa, for 4-part cello ensemble with optional 5th part (2012)
- Imbroglio, for trumpet, clarinet, and string quartet (2014)
- The View, for trumpet, clarinet, and string quartet (2018)

=== Solo works ===
- Angoisse, for solo piano (1999)
- Probono, for solo piano (2002)

=== Film scores ===
- Who Cares About the Saints? (2009)
- The Real Deal (2014)
