= Cornell University Chorus =

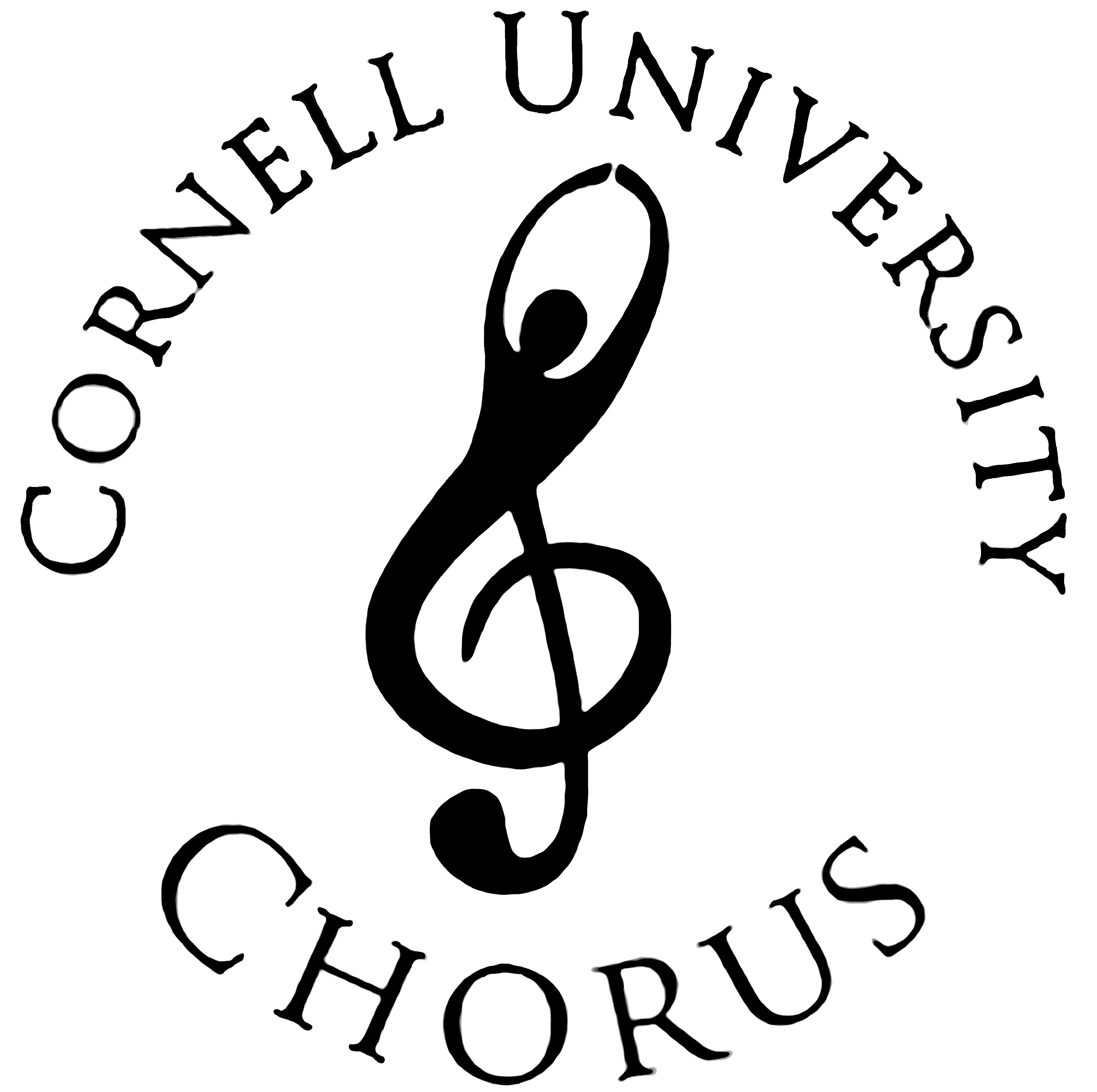

Background information
- Origin: Cornell University in Ithaca, New York
- Genres: Choral, classical, and other genres
- Years active: 1920–present
- Members: Director; Joe Lerangis
- Website: www.cuchorus.com

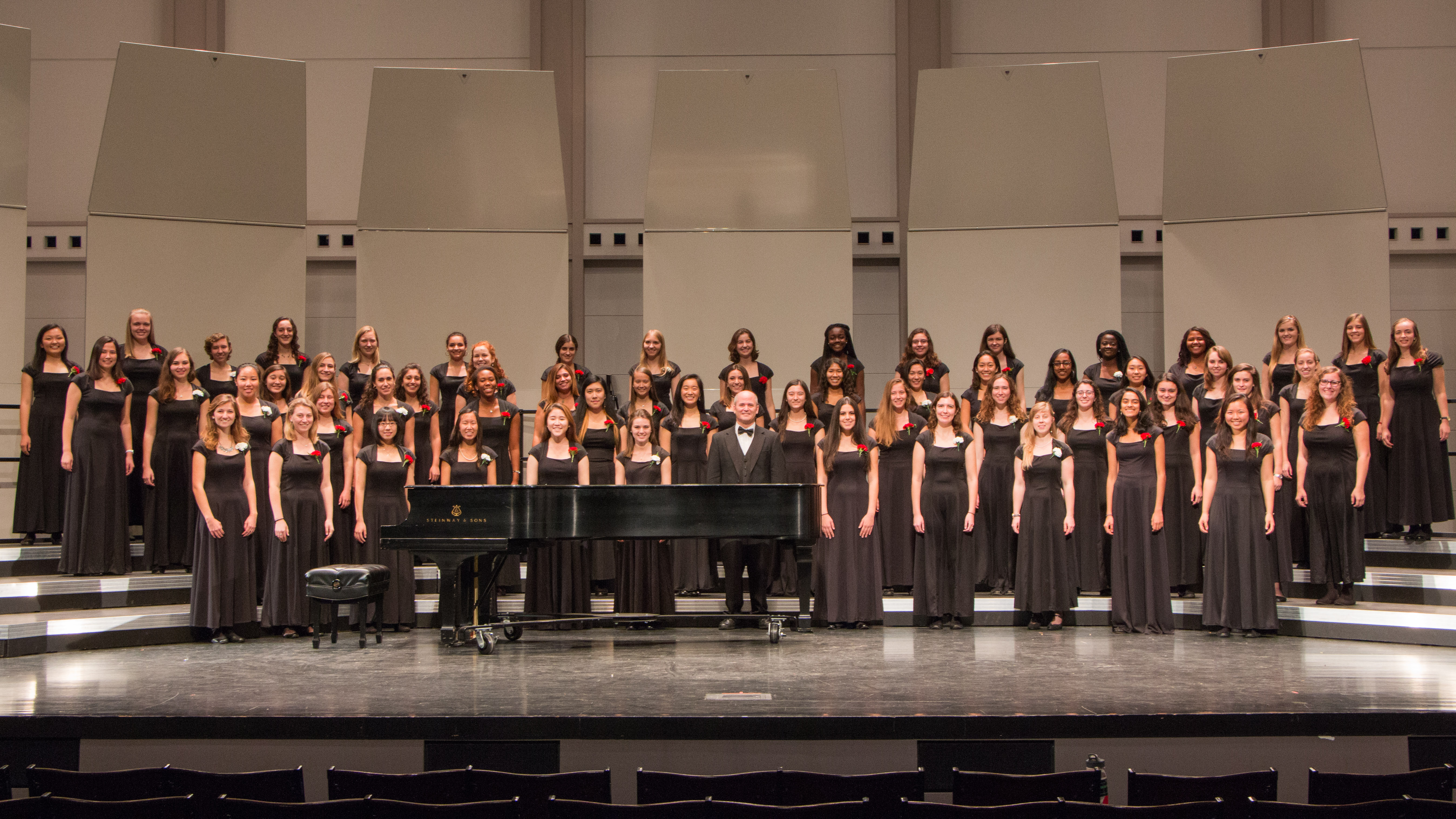
Cornell University Chorus at their annual Twilight Concert 2016

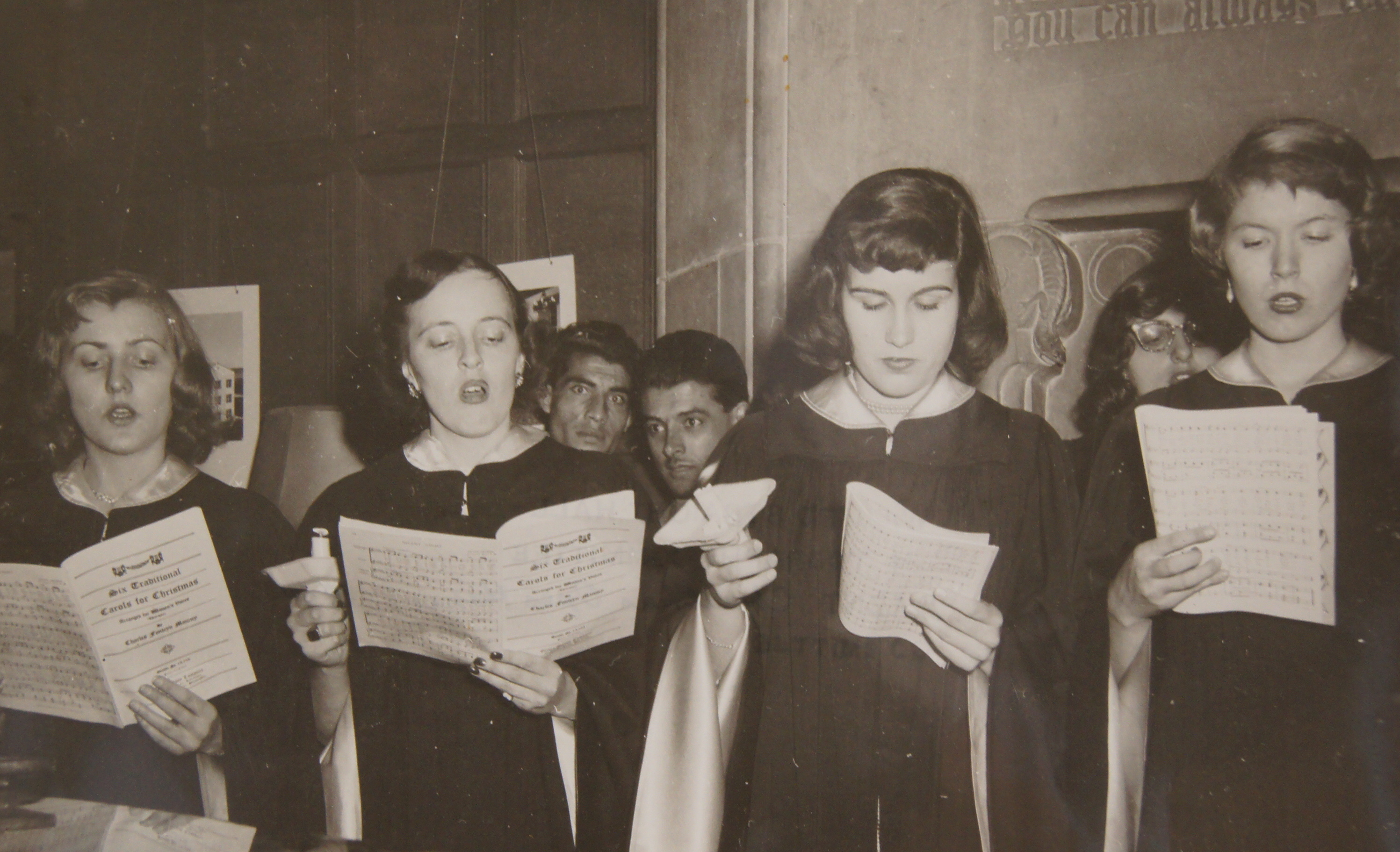
Cornell University Chorus women performing at a Christmas Open House, c. 1950

The Cornell University Chorus was founded at Cornell University in 1920 as the Cornell Women's Glee Club. The chorus is a 60-member treble choir with a repertoire that includes masses, motets, spirituals, classical, folk, 20th-century music, and traditional Cornell songs. The Chorus also performs major works with the Cornell University Glee Club such as Beethoven's Missa Solemnis, Handel's Messiah, and Bach's Mass in B Minor and St Matthew Passion .

The Chorus performs annually during Convocation, First-Year Parents Weekend, Homecoming, Senior Week, Commencement, and Reunion Weekend. In addition to its concerts on campus, the Chorus also has experience in professional settings, working under the baton of Nadia Boulanger, Eugene Ormandy, Erich Leinsdorf, Michael Tilson Thomas, Julius Rudel, and Karel Husa on the stages of Carnegie Hall and the Lincoln Center in New York City, the Kennedy Center in Washington, D.C., the Academy of Music in Philadelphia, and the Saratoga Performing Arts Center in Saratoga Springs, New York.

The Chorus has also been featured on two nationwide broadcasts. a special half hour on CBS Radio, and an appearance on PBS's MacNeil/Lehrer News Hour as part of an artistic feature on former director Susan Davenny Wyner. The Chorus has collaborated with world musician Samite of Uganda, participated in a production of Richard Einhorn's Voices of Light with Anonymous 4, and performed several major works with the Syracuse Symphony Orchestra, including Bach's Mass in B Minor, Beethoven's Symphony No. 9, and Lili Boulanger's Du fond de l'abîme with the Cornell Symphony Orchestra.

== Commissioning Project ==
In 2003, the Cornell University Chorus launched a commissioning project known informally as "No Whining, No Flowers." The goal of the project is to expand the contemporary repertoire for treble choirs by commissioning pieces from women composers using text from women writers. Furthermore, these texts are intended to explore topics that differ from the traditional treble repertoire themes of lost love and scenery admiration - hence the title of the project. Commissioning projects to date include:

- Elizabeth Alexander: Why I Pity the Woman Who Never Spills (2003)
- Sally Lamb: The Sadness of the Sea (2004)
- Edie Hill: A Voice (2005)
- Carol E. Barnett: Song of Perfect Propriety (2006)
- Augusta Read Thomas: Juggler of Day (2007)
- Abbie Betinis: Chant for Great Compassion (2008)
- Libby Larsen: A Book of Spells (2009)
- David Conte: To Music (2010) (Special commission in honor of Chorus alumna Heather Walters, '81, who died on August 27, 2009)
- Sally Lamb: Voices of the Hills (2011)
- Kay Rhie: Kassia's Hymn (2012)
- Flannery Cunningham: Onion Days (2013)
- Lisa Bielawa: Songs from Ort (2014)
- Mia Makaroff: Jump the Chromosome and Perception Test (2016)
- Christine Donkin: The Grail Bird (2017)
- Melissa Dunphy: It Isn't a Dream (2018)
- Hanne Bæverfjord: It Comes Unadorned (2019)

== Domestic and international tours ==
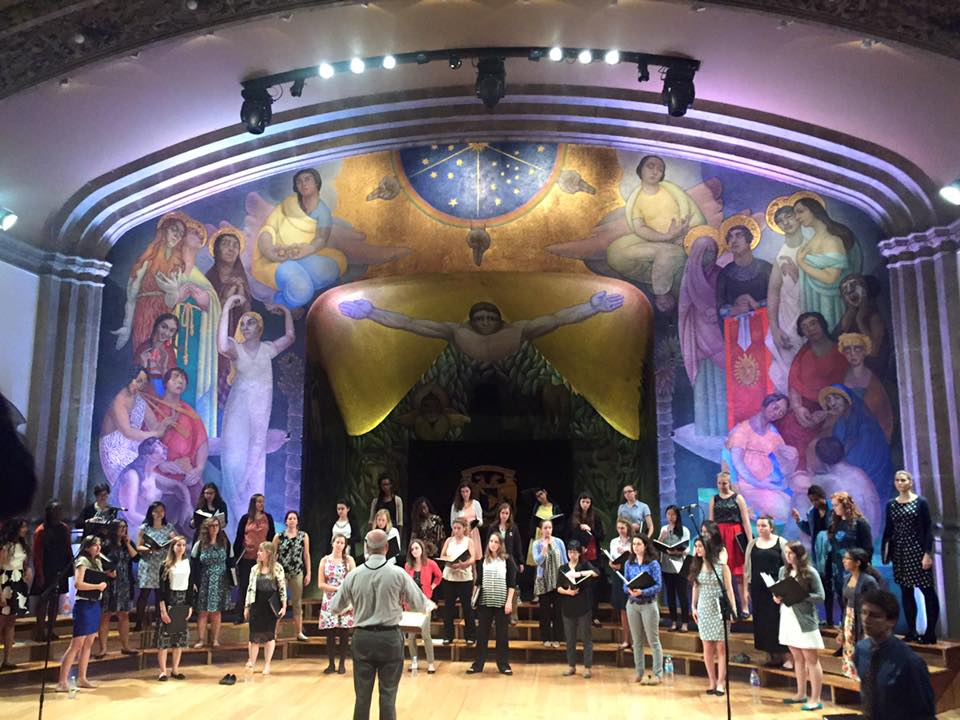
The Chorus rehearsing for their performance at the Bolivar Amphitheater in Mexico City during their tour of Mexico and Guatemala in January 2016

- 1998 - Taiwan
- 1999 - U.S. Midwest
- 2000 - Canada
- 2001 - Venezuela (with the Cornell University Glee Club)
- 2003 - U.S. Mid Atlantic
- 2004 - U.S. Great Lakes region
- 2005 - Italy
- 2008 - China (with the Cornell University Glee Club)
- 2012 - Oklahoma, Texas, and Louisiana
- 2013 - New England
- 2014 - U.S. Midwest
- 2015 - California
- 2016 - Mexico and Guatemala (with the Cornell University Glee Club)
- 2017 - Southeastern United States
- 2018 - Gulf Coast
- 2019 - Canada and Boston
- 2020 - Pacific Northwest (with the Cornell University Glee Club)
- 2023 - California
- 2024 - Northeast Tour (with the Cornell University Glee Club)
- 2025 - Europe (with the Cornell University Glee Club)

In addition to these extended trips, the Chorus also travels to other universities for competitions and festivals. In the past, they have performed at Harvard for the Centennial Celebration of the Radcliffe Choral Society as well as joint concerts with the Toronto Women's Chorus, the Penn State Glee Club, and the Wellesley Chorus.

== Directors ==
- 1920–1942: Lillian (Mrs.Eric Sydney) Dudley
- 1942–1945: John Marinus Kuypers
- 1945–1946: Paul John Weaver
- 1946-1947: Mrs. Don Price
- 1947-1951: Mrs. F. Clinton White
- 1951–1957: Thomas Brodhead Tracy
- 1957–1958: Thomas Andrew Sokol
- 1958-1960: James F. Armstrong (When Armstrong left to return to Harvard in 1960, the Women's Glee Club was disbanded, and replaced by the Cornell Chorus, under the direction of Thomas Sokol.)
- 1960-1963: Thomas Andrew Sokol
- 1963-1964: William C. Holmes (acting director)
- 1964-1965: Thomas Andrew Sokol
- 1965-1966: Thomas Andrew Sokol (Fall); William C. Holmes (Acting Director - Spring)
- 1966-1970: Thomas Andrew Sokol
- 1970-1971: David Buttolph (Fall): Thomas Andrew Sokol (Spring)
- 1971-1974: Thomas Andrew Sokol
- 1974-1975: Donna Bloom
- 1975-1983: Thomas Andrew Sokol
- 1983- 1984: Thomas Andrew Sokol (Fall); Byron Adams (Acting Director -Spring)
- 1984-1985: Thomas Andrew Sokol
- 1985-1986: Byron Adams (acting director)
- 1986-1987: Thomas Andrew Sokol
- 1987-1991: Susan Davenny Wyner
- 1991-1995: Ron Schiller
- 1995–2012: Scott Arthur Tucker
- 2012–2013: John Rowehl
- 2013–2020: Robert Isaacs
- 2021–2022: Sarah Bowe
- 2022–present: Joe Lerangis

== A Cappella Subsets ==
=== After Eight (1991-present) ===
After Eight, formed in 1991, is the official a cappella subset of the Cornell University Chorus. After Eight regularly performs contemporary repertoire arranged for a cappella by current members and alumnae of the group. They additionally perform selections from the Chorus repertoire on occasion, as well as traditional Cornell songs. After Eight has two major on-campus concerts every semester, one in the Fall (Witching Hour) and one in the Spring (Evening Affair). They also perform around campus at student and alumni events throughout the year.

=== Earlier subset history ===
Nothing But Treble (1976-1990) formed as a subset of the Chorus in 1976. In 1990, the group disassociated from the Chorus. They are still an active a cappella group on campus.

== See also ==
- Cornell University Glee Club
- List of Cornell Songs
