= Freudenberg, Bavaria =

Freudenberg
- Municipality
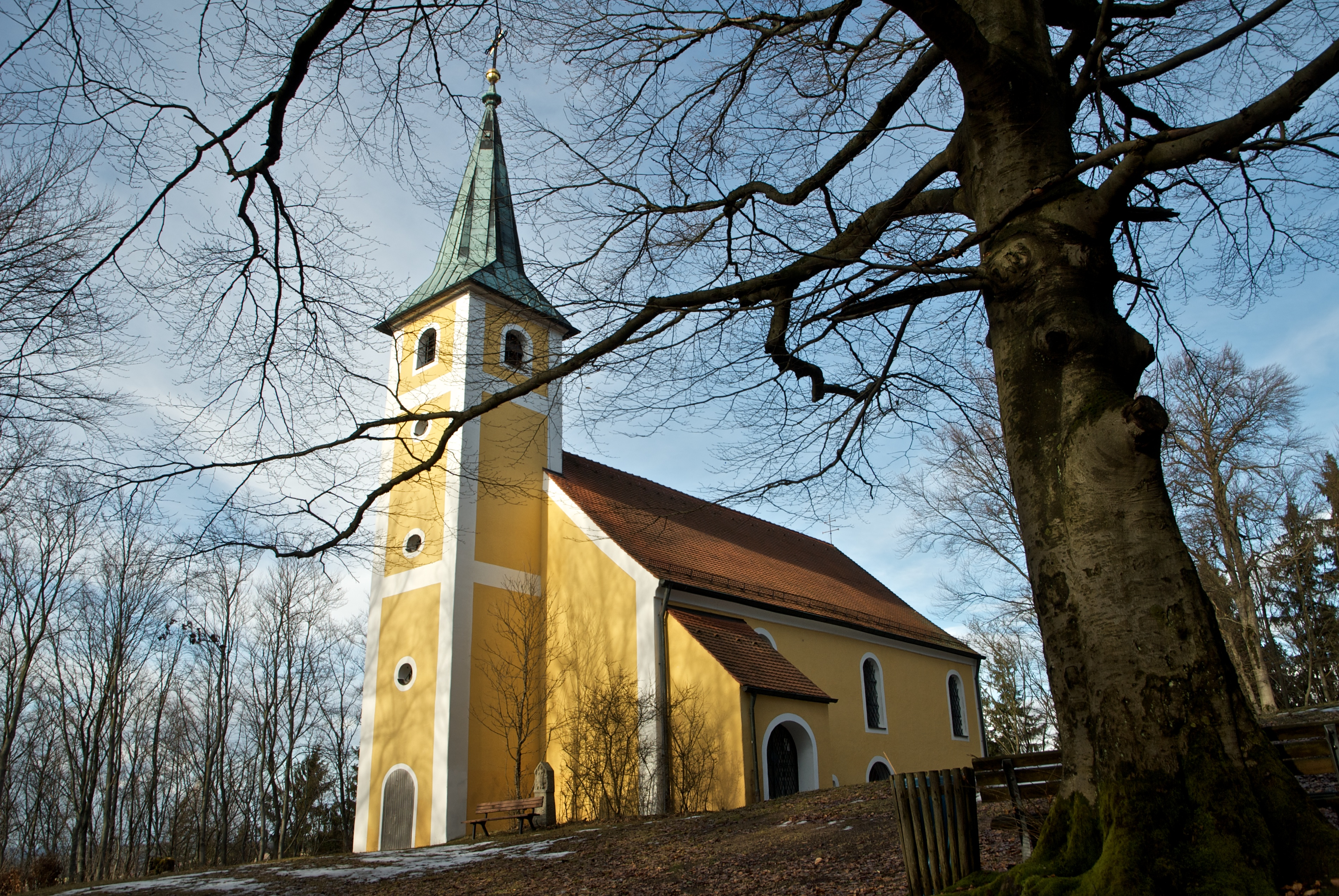
- Church of Saint John the Baptist

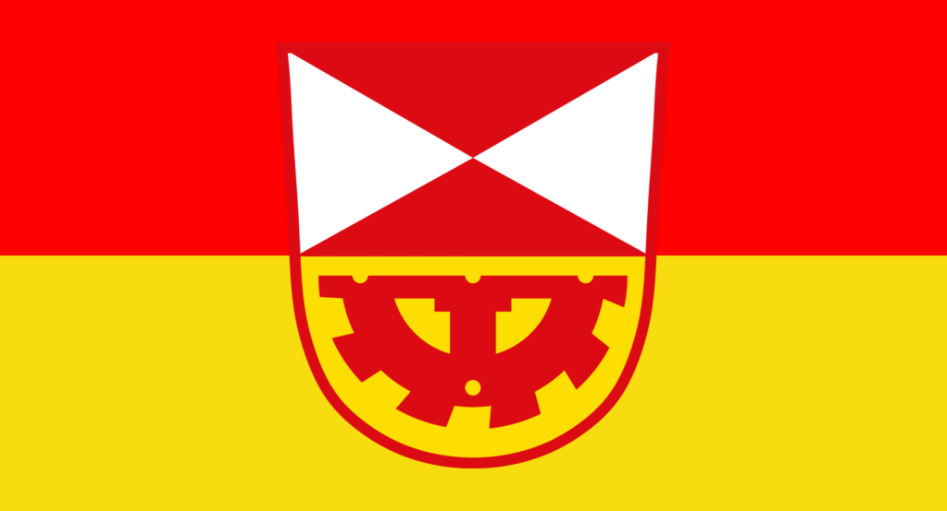
- Flag Coat of arms

- Location of Freudenberg within Amberg-Sulzbach district
- Interactive map of Freudenberg
- Location within Germany Location within Bavaria
- Coordinates: 49°29′N 11°59′E
- Country: Germany
- State: Bavaria
- Admin. region: Oberpfalz
- District: Amberg-Sulzbach

Government
  - Mayor (2020–26): Alwin Märkl (CSU)

Area
  - Total: 78.81 km^{2} (30.43 sq mi)
- Elevation: 470 m (1,540 ft)

Population (2025-12-31)
  - Total: 4,054
  - Density: 51.44/km^{2} (133.2/sq mi)
- Time zone: UTC+01:00 (CET)
  - Summer (DST): UTC+02:00 (CEST)
- Postal codes: 92272
- Dialling codes: 09627
- Vehicle registration: AS
- Website: www.gemeinde-freudenberg.de

Freudenberg (pronounced [ˈfʁɔʏdn̩ˌbɛʁk]) is a municipality in the Amberg-Sulzbach district, in Bavaria, Germany. It is situated approximately 10 km north-east of Amberg.

== Geography ==
Apart from Freudenberg, the municipality consists of the following villages:

- Altenricht
- Aschach
- Bärnmühle
- Baumgarten
- Berghof
- Buchenöd
- Bühl
- Ellersdorf
- Etsdorf
- Geiselhof
- Götzendorf
- Greßmühle
- Hainstetten
- Hammermühle
- Hiltersdorf
- Holzhaus
- Hötzelsdorf
- Immenstetten
- Kohlmühle
- Lintach
- Oberpennading
- Paulsdorf
- Pursruck
- Rannahof
- Schlauderhof
- Schleißdorf
- Schwand
- Ströhlhof
- Thann
- Traglhof
- Unterpennading
- Witzlricht
- Wutschdorf
