= Scott Tucker (conductor) =

American conductor

Scott Arthur Tucker (September 17, 1957 – present) is an American conductor. He is most widely known as the artistic director of the Choral Arts Society of Washington from 2012 to 2022, and as the director of choral music at Cornell University from 1995 to 2012.

== Biography ==
=== Early years ===
Tucker was born on September 17, 1957, in Massachusetts. He started playing the trumpet at the age of nine, His maternal grandfather was an amateur musician and his sister became a professional musician. He received a BS in psychology from Tufts University and a bachelor of music in trumpet performance from the New England Conservatory of Music through a five-year, double degree program. He then spent some years as a freelance musician in the Boston area. He subsequently earned a Master of Music degree in choral conducting from the New England Conservatory. Following his graduate degree, Tucker served as assistant choral director at Harvard University for six years under Jameson Marvin, and as choral director at Milton Academy where his duties also included coaching basketball. He also served as a tenor soloist at King's Chapel in Boston under the direction of Daniel Pinkham.

=== Cornell University, 1995–2012 ===
In 1995, he was appointed as assistant professor at Cornell's music department, and as the director of choral music including responsibility for directing the Cornell University Glee Club and the Cornell University Chorus. A review of a glee club performance in 2000 by The Washington Post, while not uncritical, found that Tucker had "forged an ensemble of a cappella singers fully in touch with one another." Things improved steadily, and by 2011 a review in the San Francisco Classical Voice described Tucker as "a conductor who knows his medium well," praising "the ease and smoothness of the delivery, the unity in the expressive shaping of phrases, [and] the musical flow," all of which reflected "Tucker's sound musicianship and obvious rapport with his singers."

The Cornell choral program also experienced organizational growth during Tucker's tenure. In 2006, Tucker's position was endowed as the Priscilla Edwards Browning Director of Choral Music. While at Cornell, he oversaw new commissioning projects for both the Chorus and Glee Club, including a project for the Chorus informally titled "No Whining, No Flowers" that focused on commissioning women composers to set texts by women poets.

=== Choral Arts Society of Washington, 2012–2022 ===
On March 28, 2012, Tucker was appointed as director of the Choral Arts Society of Washington, succeeding Norman Scribner for the 2012–13 season. Tucker was viewed as a surprise candidate and a relatively unknown figure in Washington. His musicality, rapport with the chorus during the audition process, and fundraising and commissioning experience were all viewed as factors positively contributing to his selection. After ten seasons, Tucker retired as director of choral arts at the end of the 2021–22 season.

== Awards ==
Under Tucker's direction, the Cornell University Glee Club performed as an invited chorus at the 2009 American Choral Directors Association National Convention in Oklahoma City, Oklahoma. The Glee Club was also accepted to compete in the 2012 Llangollen International Musical Eisteddfod in Wales.

Tucker previously received a Talbot Baker Award from Milton Academy for excellence in teaching, an award from the St. Botolph Club Foundation in Boston, and was a Presser Scholar at Tufts University.
