= Wilmot Moses Smith =

American judge

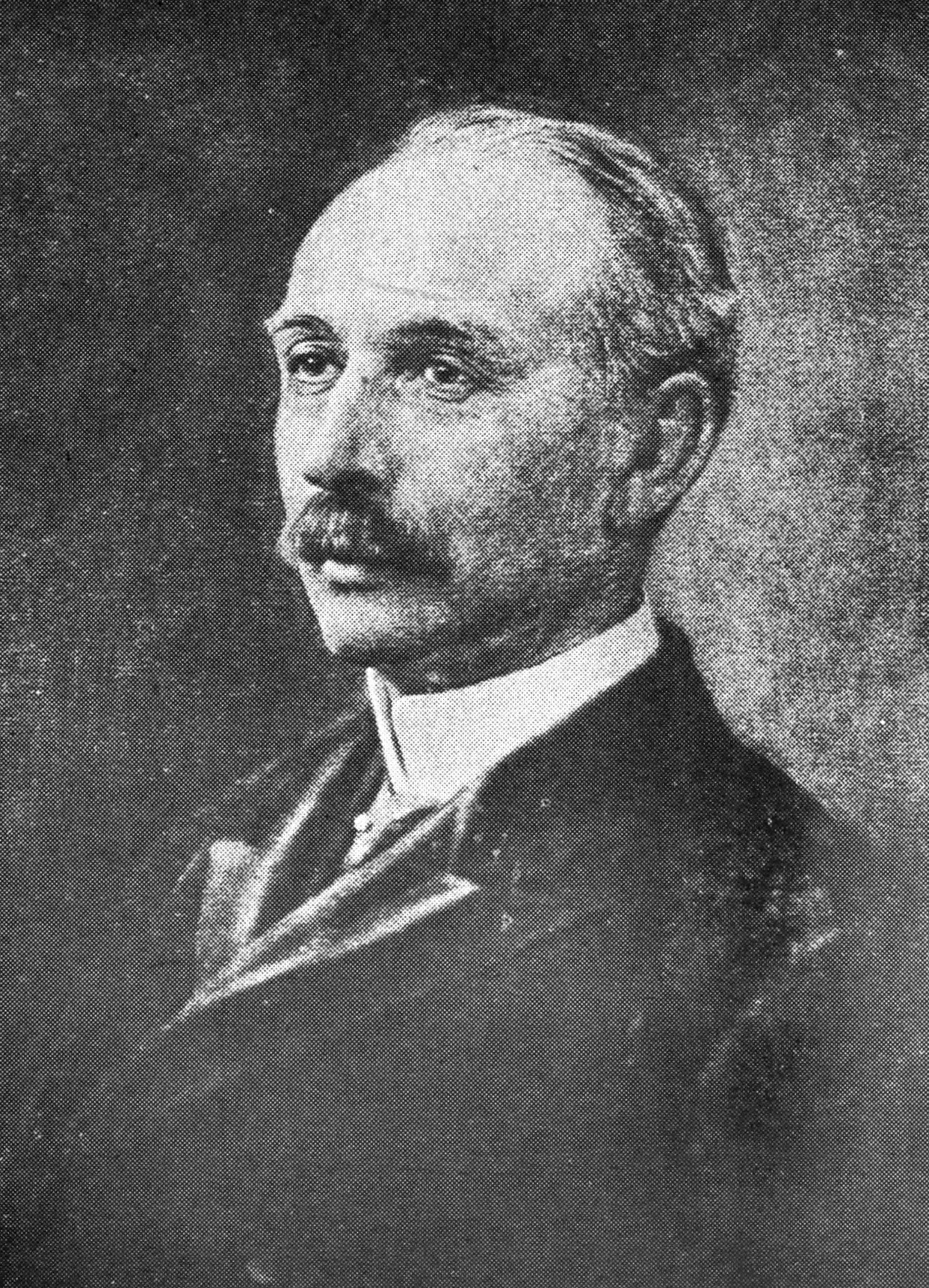
- Born: March 1, 1852; Hauppauge, New York, United States
- Died: 1906 (aged 53–54); Patchogue, New York, United States
- Occupations: Jurist, songwriter
- Notable work: "Far Above Cayuga's Waters"

Wilmot Moses Smith (March 1, 1852 – 1906) was an American jurist and songwriter. He served on the New York Supreme Court.

In 1872, while attending Cornell University, he and his roommate, Archibald Croswell Weeks, composed the lyrics to "Far Above Cayuga's Waters", which would become Cornell's alma mater.

== Early life ==
Born in Hauppauge, New York, to Moses R. Smith and Mary H. (Wood) Smith, Smith went to schools in Smithtown, New York. He attended Cornell University, where he was a brother of Delta Upsilon and earned a law degree in 1877.

== Law career ==
Smith was admitted to the New York bar in 1877, and began practicing law in Patchogue, New York in 1879. He married Lizzie L. Mott on November 24, 1881. He was the district attorney of Suffolk County in 1884 until he became a county judge in 1891. He was later elevated to the New York Supreme Court, representing the 2nd district.

== Resting place ==
He and his wife are buried in the Cedar Grove Cemetery in Patchogue, New York. In 1970 his crypt was broken into by a group of teenagers. Lizzie Smith's skeleton was discovered floating in the Patchogue River. Both he and his wife were re-interred in a new Crypt in Cedar Grove. The Wilmont M. Smith Elementary School aka. Bay Avenue built in 1908 in Patchogue, New York was named for him.
