= Nene (name) =

- Gender: Feminine or Masculine depending on culture.
- Language: Spanish, Brazilian, Portuguese, Japanese, Turkish, Crimean Tatar

Origin
- Languages: Romance, Japonic, Turkic
- Meaning: In Romance languages: "baby". In Japanese: Different meanings depending on the kanji used. In Turkic languages: "grandmother".

Other names
- Variant forms: Néné, Nené, Nenê and Nenè
- Anglicisation: Nene
- Related names: Nena

Nene is a feminine and masculine given name, surname and nickname in several cultures.

In Spanish, it is generally a masculine term of endearment and an affectionate nickname meaning "baby". Alternative variations such as Neneh, Néné, Nené, Nenê and Nenè are used within Latin America, with Nenê being more common in Brazil. The feminine form of this nickname is Nena.

In Turkish and other Turkic languages such as Crimean Tatar, Nene means "grandmother", and is also generally used as a nickname for elderly women.

In Japanese, Nene is exclusively a feminine given name. It can be written as "ねね" and rarely "ネネ", or it can be written using different kanji characters and can mean:

- 祢々, "shrine, mausoleum"
- 禰々, "ancestral shrine, mausoleum, idol"
- 寧々, "peaceful, tranquil"
- 音々, "sound, voice"
- 寧子, "peaceful and tranquil child" (These kanji can also be read as Yasuko.)

== People with this nickname or professional name ==
Female

- Néné (1834–1890), nickname of Duchess Helene in Bavaria
- Nene Hatun (1857–1955), Turkish folk heroine
- Nené Cascallar (1914–1982), pen name of late Argentine writer Alicia Inés Botto
- Nene Gare (1919–1994), professional name of late Australian writer and artist Doris Violet May Wadham
- Nene Go (born 1962), nickname of former Filipino politician Ma. Catalina L. Loreto-Go
- Nene (born 1997), nickname of Thai-Chinese singer and actress Pornnappan Pornpenpipat
- Nene (2000–2019), nickname of the late South African murder victim Uyinene Mrwetyana
- Nene Royal (born 2010), Thai musician
- Momosuzu Nene, Japanese VTuber affiliated with Hololive Production

Male

- Nenè (1917–2007), nickname of late Sicilian mafia boss Antonino Geraci
- Nene (1933–2019), nickname of the late Filipino politician and human rights lawyer Aquilino Pimentel Jr.
- Nené (1942–2016), nickname of Brazilian footballer Claudio Olinto de Carvalho
- Nene (born 1949), nickname of Peruvian footballer Teófilo Juan Cubillas Arizaga
- Nené (footballer, born 1949), nickname of Portuguese footballer Tamagnini Manuel Gomes Baptista
- Nené (born 1964), nickname of Spanish football manager and a former player José Antonio de la Ballina Avilés
- Nenê (born 1976), nickname of Brazilian women's footballer Elissandra Regina Cavalcanti
- Nené (footballer, born 1979) (born 1979), nickname of Cape Verdean footballer Adriano Barbosa Miranda da Luz
- Nenê (footballer, born 1981), nickname of Brazilian footballer Anderson Luiz de Carvalho
- Nenê (footballer, born 1983), nickname of Brazilian footballer Ânderson Miguel da Silva
- Nenê (born 1983), nickname of Brazilian futsal player João Carlos Gonçalves Filho
- Nenê (born 1992), nickname of Brazilian footballer Luis Otavio Bonilha de Oliveira
- Nené (footballer, born 1996), nickname of Mozambican footballer Feliciano João Jone

== People with this given name ==
Female

- Kōdai-in, formerly known as Nene (ねね, 1546–1624), principal samurai wife of Toyotomi Hideyoshi
- Nene (禰々, 1528–1543), sister of Takeda Shingen, a pre-eminent daimyō in feudal Japan
- Nene (祢々, 1585–1644), Japanese noble lady, aristocrat and later daimyō
- Nene (音々), former member of Japanese heavy mental band Destrose
- Nene Hieda (稗田 寧々, born 1997), Japanese voice actress and singer
- Nene Humphrey (born 1947), American installation artist
- Nene Jitoe (地頭江 音々, born 2000), Japanese idol and member of HKT48
- Nene King (born 1943), American journalist
- NeNe Leakes (born 1967), American actress
- Nene Ito (伊藤 寧々, born 1995), former member of Japanese idol group Nogizaka46
- Nene Otsuka (大塚 寧々, born 1968), Japanese actress
- Nene Sakai (酒井 寧子, born 1995), Japanese long track speed skater
- Nene Sakuragi (桜木 寧々), former member of Japanese idol group Houkago Princess
- Nene Sugisaki (杉﨑 寧々, born 1998), former member of Japanese idol group Sakura Gakuin
- Nene Tamayo (born 1981), Filipina reality television personality
- Nene Thomas (born 1968), American artist
- Nene Tomita (冨田 寧寧), Japanese-born Chinese volleyball player
- Nene Yokode (横出 寧々), Japanese model and former Miss Universe Japan 2017 contestant

Male

- Nene Amegatcher (born 1953), Ghanaian lawyer, academic and judge
- Nenê (born 1982), Brazilian basketball player who adopted it as his legal mononym
- Nene Macdonald (born 1995), Papua New Guinean rugby league footballer
- Nene Obianyo (born 1947), Nigerian paediatric surgeon

== Fictional characters with the given name ==
- Nêne, title character of the 1920 novel Nêne by Ernest Pérochon
- Nenè, title character of the 1977 Italian film Nenè
- Nene Romanova in the anime series Bubblegum Crisis
- Nene in the video game and anime series Blue Dragon
- Nene, a playable character in the video game series Samurai Warriors
- Nene Sakurada in the anime series Crayon Shin-chan
- Nene Amano (天野 ネネ), a character in the anime series Digimon Fusion
- Nene Yashiro, the main female character of Toilet-Bound Hanako-kun
- Nene Kusanagi, from the mobile rhythm game Project Sekai: Colorful Stage! feat. Hatsune Miku
- Nene Kinokuni (紀ノ国 寧々), a character in the manga and anime series Food Wars!: Shokugeki no Soma
- Neneh, the title character of the 2022 French film Neneh Superstar

== People with this surname ==
- Adriano Néné (born 1979), Cape Verde footballer
- Levy Nene (born 2006), Malian-Ivorian footballer
- Tāmati Wāka Nene (1785–1871), Māori chief
- Zakithi Nene, South African sprinter
- Madhuri Dixit Nene, Indian actress
- Nhlanhla Nene (born 1958), former South African Minister of Finance

== See also ==
- Nene (disambiguation)
- Nena (name)
