= Nene =

Nene may refer to:

== People ==
- Nene (name), list of people with this name
- Nenê (born 1982), formerly Maybyner Rodney Hilário, Brazilian basketball player
- Nenê (footballer, born 1925) (1925–2007), Ayrton Leite, Brazilian footballer
- Nené (footballer, born 1942) (1942–2016), Claudio Olinto de Carvalho, Brazilian footballer
- Nenê (footballer, born 1944) (1944–2014), Érico de Paula Coelho Filho, Brazilian footballer
- Nené (footballer, born 1949), Tamagnini Manuel Gomes Baptista, Portuguese footballer
- Nenê (footballer, born 1975), Fábio Camilo de Brito, Brazilian football coach and former player
- Nenê (footballer, born 1976), Elissandra Regina Cavalcanti, Brazilian footballer
- Nené (footballer, born 1979), Adriano Barbosa Miranda da Luz, Cape Verdean football player
- Nenê (footballer, born 1981), Anderson Luiz de Carvalho, Brazilian footballer
- Nenê (footballer, born 1983), Ânderson Miguel da Silva, Brazilian footballer
- Nené (footballer, born 1995), Rui Filipe Cunha Correia, Portuguese footballer
- Nené (footballer, born 1996), Feliciano João Jone, Mozambican footballer
- Nenê (futsal player) (born 1983), João Carlos Gonçalves Filho, Brazilian futsal player
- Duchess Helene in Bavaria (1834–1890), nicknamed Néné
- Kōdai-in (1546–1624), formerly known as Nene, principal samurai wife of Toyotomi Hideyoshi
- Pedro Lugo (born 1960), stage name El Nene, Cuban singer
- Uyinene Mrwetyana (2000–2019), nicknamed Nene, South African murder victim

== Other uses ==
- Nêne, 1920 novel by Ernest Pérochon
- Nenè, 1977 Italian movie
- River Nene, a river in England
- Rolls-Royce Nene, a jet engine, named after the river
- HMCS Nene (K270), a 1942 River-class Frigate in World War II
- Nene (bird), Hawaiian goose Branta sandvicensis, Hawaiian state bird
- Nene (seed), Ormosia coccinea, called nene in Costa Rica
- Nene (trail), a Seminole Indian word meaning "path"
- Nebraska Northeastern Railway (reporting mark NENE), a shortline railroad that began operations on July 23, 1996, in northeastern Nebraska

== See also ==
- Nae Nae, a hip-hop dance
