= Yasuko =

- Gender: Female

Origin
- Origin: Japanese
- Meaning: Different meanings depending on the kanji used

Yasuko (written: 泰子, 靖子, 康子, 寧子, 育子, 保子, 安子, 甯子, 恭子 or やす子) is a feminine Japanese given name. Notable people with the name include:

- Princess Yasuko (媞子内親王; 1076–1096), Japanese empress
- Yasuko Aoike (青池 保子; born 1948), Japanese manga artist
- Yasuko Date (伊達 保子; 1827–1904), Japanese businesswoman
- Yasuko Endō (遠藤 康子; 1968–1986), Japanese model and actress whose idol singer
- Yasuko Fujii (藤井 康子; born 1950), Japanese swimmer
- Fujiwara no Yasuko (藤原 泰子; 1095–1156), Japanese empress consort
- Yasuko Harada (原田 康子; 1928-2009), Japanese novelist
- Yasuko Hashimoto (橋本 康子; born 1975), Japanese long-distance runner
- Yasuko Hatoyama (鳩山 安子; 1922–2013), Japanese activist
- Yasuko Ikenobō (池坊 保子; born 1942), Japanese politician
- Yasuko Kimura (木村 安子; born 1937), Japanese long jumper
- Yasuko Kobayashi (小林 靖子; born 1965), Japanese screenwriter
- Yasuko Komiyama (小宮山 泰子; born 1965), Japanese politician
- Yasuko Konno (今野 安子; born 1950), Japanese table tennis player
- Yasuko Konoe (近衛 やす子; born 1944), Japanese princess
- Yasuko Kosuge (小菅 寧子; born 1974), Japanese former windsurfer
- Yasuko Kotani (小谷 泰子; born 1962), Japanese photographer
- Yasuko Kudo (工藤 恭子; born 1969), Japanese para table tennis player
- Yasuko Kuragaki (倉垣 靖子; born 1975), know as Tsubasa Kuragaki , Japanese professional wrestler
- Yasuko Matsuda (松田 靖子; 1937–2021), Japanese shot putter
- Yasuko Matsuda (pianist), Japanese classical pianist and educator
- Yasuko Matsuyuki (松雪 泰子; born 1972), Japanese actress and singer
- Yasuko Mitsuura (光浦 靖子; born 1971), Japanese television personality and comedian
- Yasuko Mizui (水井 泰子; born 1975), Japanese badminton player
- Yasuko Mogi (茂木 康子; born 1969), Japanese mixed martial artist
- Yasuko Muramatsu (村松 泰子; born 1944), Japanese development economist, author and women's rights activist
- Yasuko Nagazumi (永積 靖子; born 1943), Japanese actress
- Yasuko Namba (難波 康子; 1949–1996), Japanese mountain climber
- Yasuko Oishi (大石 康子; born 1931), Japanese swimmer
- Yasuko Onuki, Japanese singer
- Yasuko Sakata (坂田 靖子; born 1953), Japanese manga artist
- Yasuko Sawaguchi (沢口 靖子; born 1965), Japanese actress
- Yasuko Tajima (田島 寧子; born 1981), Japanese swimmer
- Yasuko Takano (鷹野 靖子; born 1943), Japanese speed skater
- Yasuko Takemura (竹村 泰子; 1933–2025), Japanese politician
- Yasuko I. Takezawa (竹沢 泰子; born 1957), Japanese cultural anthropologist
- Yasuko Tamada (玉田 育子), Japanese mixed martial artist
- Yasuko Thanh (born 1971), Canadian writer and guitarist
- Yasuko Tomita (富田 靖子; born 1969), Japanese actress
- Yasuko Uetake (上武 やす子; 1934-2024), Ainu embroidery artist from Japan
- Yasuko Watanabe (渡邉 泰子; 1957–1997), Japanese woman murdered in 1997
- Yasuko Watanabe (渡辺 康子), Japanese color designer and colorist
