= List of places of scenic beauty of Japan (Hokkaido) =

This list is of the places of scenic beauty of Japan located within the circuit of Hokkaido.

== National Places of Scenic Beauty ==
As of 1 September 2016, three Places have been designated at a national level.

Place	Municipality	Comments	Image	Coordinates	Type	Ref.
Pirikanoka ピリカノカ; Pirikanoka	Nayoro, Ishikari			45°03′19″N 142°29′15″E	10	
Kōsetsu-en 旧岩船氏庭園 (香雪園); Kyū-Iwafune-shi teien (Kōsetsu-en)	Hakodate			41°47′34″N 140°48′12″E	1	
Mount Tento 天都山; Tento-san	Abashiri			43°59′56″N 144°14′15″E	11	

== Prefectural Places of Scenic Beauty ==
As of 17 August 2016, two Places have been designated at a prefectural level.

Place	Municipality	Comments	Image	Coordinates	Type	Ref.
Koshimizu Coast 小清水海岸; Koshimizu kaigan	Koshimizu			43°56′24″N 144°25′30″E		
Hagoromo Falls 羽衣の滝; Hagoromo no taki	Higashikawa			43°37′35″N 142°47′13″E		

== Municipal Places of Scenic Beauty ==
As of 1 May 2016, eight Places have been designated at a municipal level.

Place	Municipality	Comments	Image	Coordinates	Type	Ref.
Ebisu and Daikoku Rocks 奇岩えびす・大黒岩 kigan Ebisu・Daikoku-iwa	Yoichi			43°14′11″N 140°44′06″E		for all refs see
Candle Rock 奇岩ローソク岩 kigan rōsoku-iwa	Yoichi			43°15′08″N 140°43′20″E		
Mount Hōrai 蓬莱山; Hōrai-san	Shinhidaka			42°15′44″N 142°35′33″E		
Mount E 恵山; Hōrai-san	Hakodate			41°48′17″N 141°09′58″E		
Dōnan Kongō 道南金剛; Dōnan Kongō	Hakodate			41°44′09″N 141°03′28″E		
Sainokawara 賽の河原; Sain no kawara	Hakodate			41°48′33″N 141°09′33″E		
Umemura Gardens 梅村庭園; Umemura teien	Yakumo			42°15′18″N 140°16′08″E		
Nabetsuru Rock 鍋釣岩; Nabetsuru-iwa	Okushiri			42°09′58″N 139°31′04″E		

== Registered Places of Scenic Beauty ==
As of 1 September 2016, one Monument has been registered (as opposed to designated) as a Place of Scenic Beauty at a national level.

Place	Municipality	Comments	Image	Coordinates	Type	Ref.
Hakodate Park 函館公園; Hakodate kōen	Hakodate			41°45′22″N 140°42′56″E		

== See also ==
- Cultural Properties of Japan
- List of Historic Sites of Japan (Hokkaido)
- List of parks and gardens of Hokkaido
- Blue Pond (Biei)
