= Yafurai-date =

- 矢不来館跡 (Japanese)
- Location within Hokkaido Location within Japan
- 41°47′13″N 140°36′48″E
- Type: Fortified residence or castle
- Periods: Muromachi period
- Location: Yafurai, Hokuto, Hokkaidō, Japan

The site of Yafurai-date (矢不来館跡, Yafurai-date ato) in Hokuto, Hokkaidō, Japan, is the grounds once occupied by the castle or fortified residence of Yafurai. Recent excavations have unearthed ceramics and other finds that help locate the site within Muromachi-period long-distance trade networks.

== Overview ==
Yafurai-date is situated on the Oshima Peninsula in the Yafurai area of what is now the city of Hokuto, near a small river a few hundred metres from the coast. Mobetsu-date, one of the so-called "Twelve Forts of Southern Hokkaidō" (道南十二館), also in the Yafurai area, lies a couple of kilometers to the south. Mention in the historical record of "Mobetsu-Yafurai-date" (「茂別矢不来館」) is understood to be a reference to the two together and two local genealogies, those of the Matsumae Shimoguni Family (松前下国氏系譜) and of the house of Shimoguni Ikoma Abe (下国伊駒安倍姓之家譜), refer to their being sacked by Ainu in Eiroku 5 (1562), the occasion on which Shimoguni Morosue took flight.

Excavation of one area of Yafurai-date in 1999–2000 unearthed a number of celadons, indicative of the elevated social status of its former occupants, and the site was hailed as the "Thirteenth Fort", the relationship with Mobetsu-date to be clarified by future excavation of that site. In 2010–2011, further excavation of Yafurai-date revealed earthworks, a palisade, two tombs, and a wealth of finds: Chinese and Japanese ceramics (including celadons, white porcelain, tenmoku tea bowls, Seto ware, Mino ware, and Echizen ware), a sword and sword-fittings, a tea kettle, an incense-burner, an iron pan, coins, a bell, lacquerware, and glass beads, helping date Yafurai-date to the mid-fifteenth to early-sixteenth centuries. An assemblage of one hundred and twenty-two artefacts (36 ceramics, 2 objects made of iron, 14 of bronze, 2 of stone, 66 coins, 1 glass bead, and 1 item of lacquerware) now at the Hokuto City Hometown Museum has been designated a Prefectural Tangible Cultural Property and attests to the connections between southwest Hokkaidō and the Sea of Japan coast during the Muromachi period.

== See also ==
- List of Historic Sites of Japan (Hokkaidō)
- List of Cultural Properties of Japan - archaeological materials (Hokkaidō)
- Hokuto City Hometown Museum
- Hakodate City Museum
- Shinori-date
