= Hekirichi Bastion Fort =

First star-shaped Bastion fort in Japan

Hekirichi Bastion Fort of Matsumae Clan
- 松前藩戸切地陣屋 (Matsumae-Han Hekirichi Jinya)
- Part of Bakumatsu
- base of a tongue-shaped plateau Near Hokuto in Japan
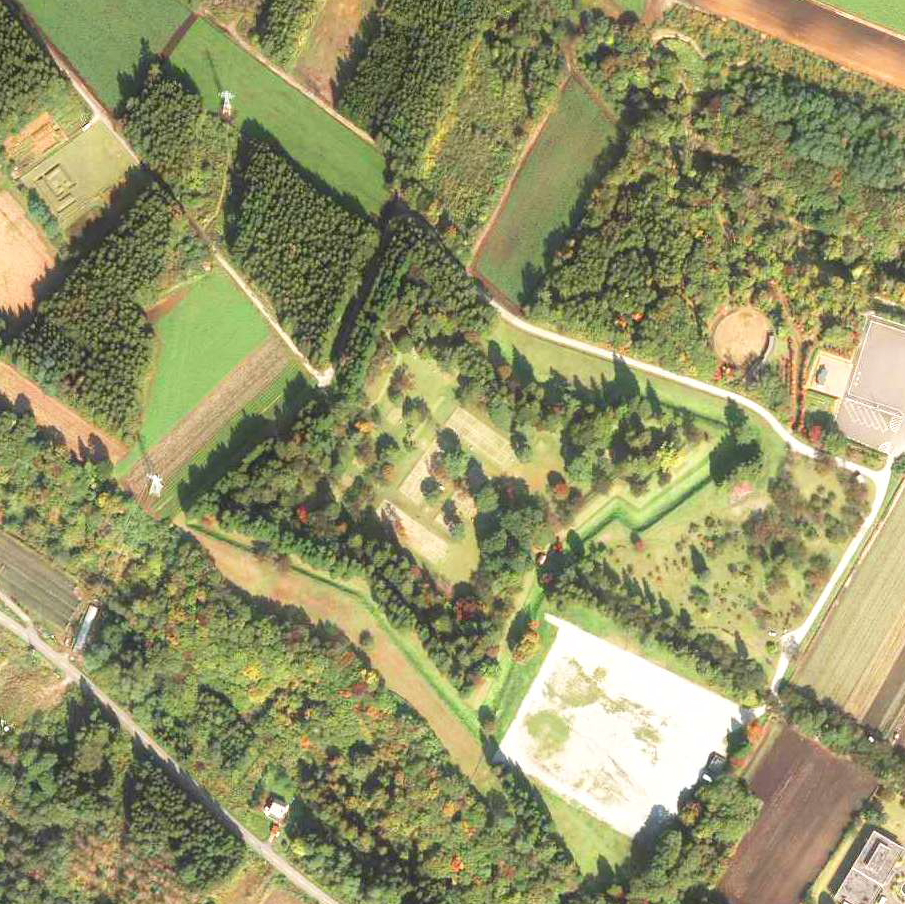
- The Headquarter(star-formed fort) of Hekirichi Bastion Fort

Site information
- Type: Bastion fort (4-star-shaped)
- Condition: Good

Location
- Coordinates: 41°51′11.06″N 140°37′9.2″E
- Area: 434,00 square meters(Main Fort) 104,206 square meters(Historic Site Designated Area) 355,000 square meters(The total area of the Nozaki's hill as a Fort site)

Site history
- Built: 1855
- Built by: Matsumae clan, designed: Fujiwara Shume
- Materials: Earthworks
- Demolished: 1868
- Battles/wars: Hakodate War (the last part of Boshin War)

Garrison information
- Past commanders: Matsumae Takahiro

Hekirichi Bastion Fort (Japanese: 戸切地陣屋, romanized: Hekirichi Jinya, as historic site name: Hekirichi Bastion Fort of Matsumae clan site (松前藩戸切地陣屋跡, Matsumae Han Hekirichi Jinya ato) was a fortified administrative center of the Matsumae clan during the late Edo period, located in present-day Nozaki, Hokuto City, Hokkaido.

It was the first in Japan to adopt a star-shaped bastion fort design based on European bastion-style fortification techniques and the army base selection and structure for artillery defense according to 19th-century European military theory. The name "Hekirichi" originates from the Ainu language "peker-pet" (meaning "beautiful-river" or "bright-river") (Note: Sugae Masumi (菅江真澄, a Japanese traveler, 1754–1829) wrote in Hiromekari (ひろめかり, 1789): "The Ainu call this place Bekere-betsu. Bekere means "clear water", and betsu means "river", so it is said to refer to a "clear river" in contrast to a "muddy river" (Kunne-pet, present-day called "Kunebetsu" in Hokuto City), and this must be how the place got its name." Ezo no Teburi in "えぞのてぶり" (1791) wrote that "Hekirechi is called Hekere-betsu, meaning "clear river" in the Ainu language." Additionally, Uehara Kumajirō (上原熊次郎, a Japanese Ainu language interpreter, died in 1827) wrote in Study of Ezo Place Names and Mileage Record (蝦夷地名考並里程記, Ezo Chimeiko Narabi ni Ritei-ki, 1824) regarding the origin of Hekirichi, "The Ainu word Bekeri-betsu means "clear river". In Oshima Nissi (渡島日誌, 1865), Matsuura Takeshirō (松浦武四郎, a Japanese traveler, 1818–1888) recorded from his visit to Ezo in 1856 that Hekirichi is translated as Hekere-betsu, meaning "transparent". It is named for the clear, cold water.) and refers to the area surrounding the Hekirichi River, which flows west of the fort.

== Background of construction and location ==
The fort was constructed by the Matsumae clan in 1855, shortly after Japan's opening to the West, as a defensive outpost (戊営, boei, or guard post) in response to the Edo shogunate's direct control over Ezo (Hokkaido) for northern defense and the accompanying order to share responsibility for guarding the around Hakodate area (there were the Edo Shogunate's Ezo Governance Agency and one of the ports opened to foreign countries).

The designer was Fujiwara Jūta (藤原重太, died in 1868 later Fujiwara Shume, 藤原主馬), a Matsumae clansman who studied at Sakuma Shōzan's Western learning academy, Satsuki-juku (五月塾). (Note: Under Sakuma Shōzan, Fujiwara Shume had contemporaries and fellow students including Takeda Ayasaburō (武田斐三郎), Katsu Kaishū (勝海舟), Yoshida Shōin (吉田松陰), and Yamamoto Kakuma (山本覚馬), as listed in the roster of Shōzan's students, "Kyūmonroku (及門録)." The "Goryōkaku, (五稜郭)" a Bastion Fort designed by Takeda Ayasaburō, was completed in 1866, eleven years after the construction of the Hekirichi Bastion fort.) It was the first fort in Japan to adopt a star-shaped bastion fort structure based on bastion-style fortification techniques.

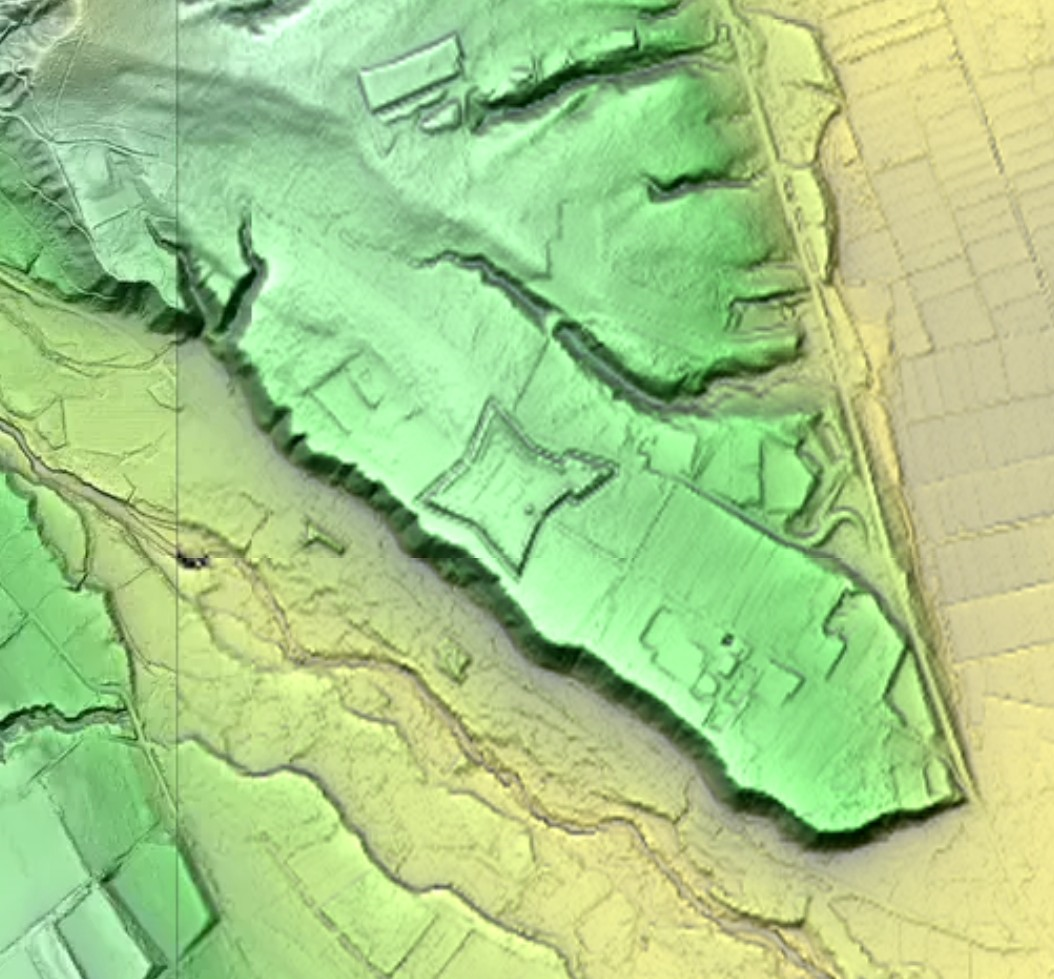
Main camp of Hekirici Bastion Fort and surrounding topography (Nozaki Hill「野崎の丘」). It is protected by the southwestern Cliff of Anatahira (アナタヒラの崖) and the streams cutting into it from the east and north.

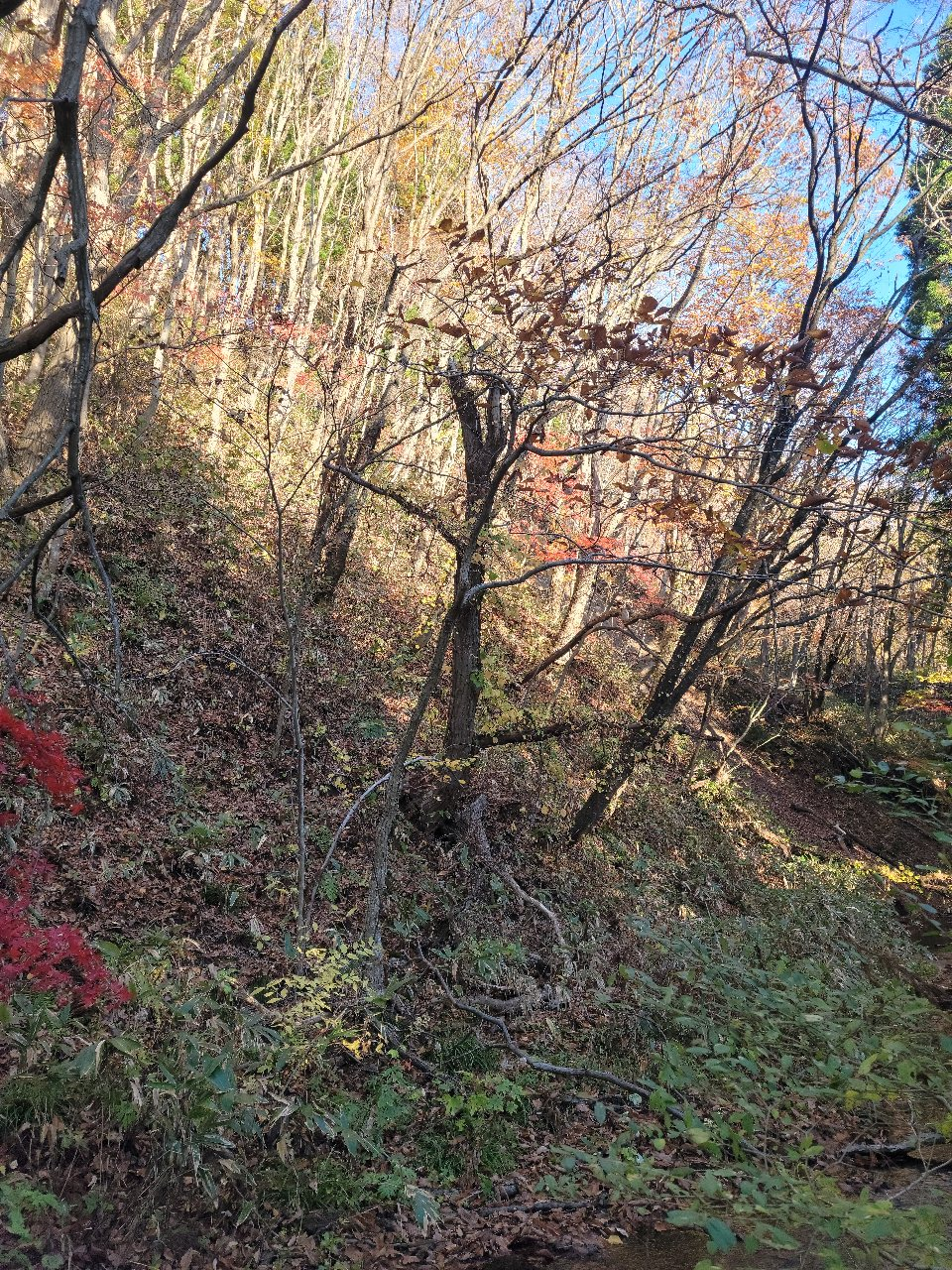
View of cliff of Anatahira (2023). A cliff face with a slope angle of 30 to 37 degrees and a relative height of 30 to 40 meters (98-131 feet) surrounds the southwestern side of Nozaki Hill for approximately 1.7 kilometers (1.06 miles).

It is built at the base of a tongue-shaped plateau commonly known as Nozaki Hill (野崎の丘, Nozaki-no-Oka) located approximately 5 kilometers (3.1 miles) northwest of present-day central Hokuto City. The main star-shaped bastion fort is situated on the highest flat surface of Nozaki Hill. It is protected by natural enclosure-like terrain, with the Cliff of Anatahira (アナタヒラの崖壁, Anatahira no Gaiheki) to the southwest as the natural castle wall, mountainous terrain extending toward the Matsumae Peninsula to the north, and a ravine to the northeast, limiting access routes to the main bastion to a gentle slope extending from the southeast. The main star-shaped bastion is a four-bastion structure composed of earthworks and moats, with six gun emplacements constructed on the eastern bastion.

Matsumae Hironaga (松前広長, 1738–1801), a mid-Edo period Matsumae clan elder and historian, highly praised the site's defensive and scenic advantages, particularly the southwest Cliff of Anatahira calling it an "unrivaled castle site in the region" (近国無双の城地, kingoku-musō-no-jōchi) and proposing it as a candidate for relocating the clan's headquarters in his work Matsumae-shi (松前志; prefaced in 1781). Additionally, explorer Kondō Juzō (近藤重蔵, 1771–1829), who inspected Ezo, recommended in a report submitted to the shogunate in 1807 that the administrative center of Ezo be moved from Matsumae to Nozaki, describing it as a strategically superior stronghold (要害之勝地, yōgai-no-shōchi). The site's evaluation as a castle location consistently remained high.

The schedule leading up to the construction of the fort was remarkably brisk. On May 8, 1855, the shogunate issued orders for the specific allocation of guard territories and the construction of guard posts following the earlier land requisition. In response, on June 8 of the same year, the Matsumae clan selected Nozaki Hill as the fort site and petitioned the Hakodate Magistrate (箱館奉行, Hakodate-bugyō) (Note: The shogunate's remote governance office in Hakodate.) to build a main guard post for Hakodate's defense, which was approved on June 10. The following day, June 11, the site was inspected by the Hakodate Magistrate, and construction of Hekirichi Bastion Fort commenced without delay. Without waiting for the harsh winter, when frozen soil becomes a major obstacle to construction in the northern region, the first Western-style fortress in Japan was completed on October 20 of the same year, with construction period of just five months.

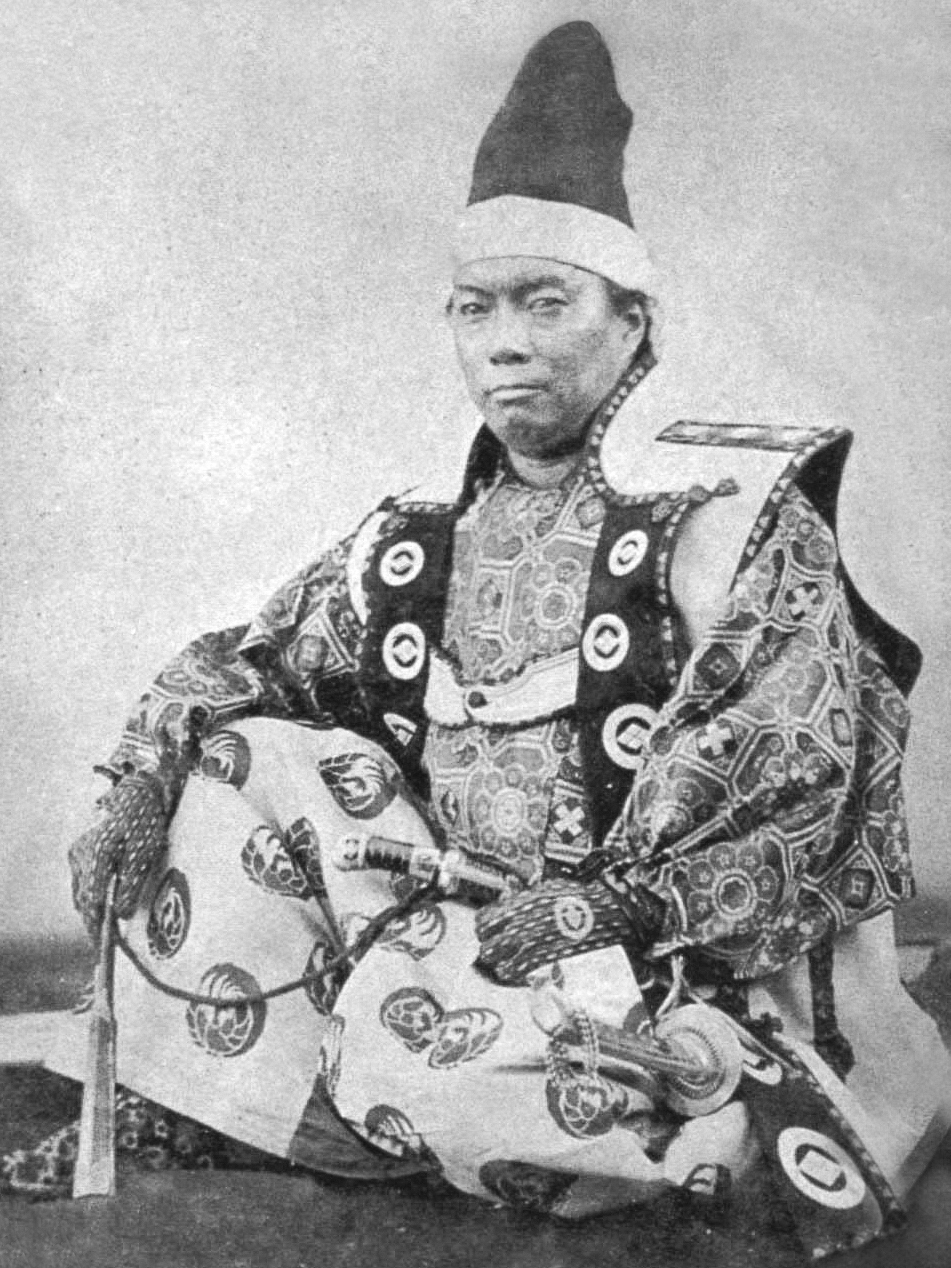
Matsumae Takahiro, Matsumae clan lord at the time of fort's completion

The fortification techniques that Fujiwara Shume acquired from European military science encompassed foundational methods for constructing fortifications, later established and systematized as combat engineer discipline. These methods integrated analytical geometric structural calculations with efficient techniques for achieving the target structure, significantly contributing to the rapid and robust completion of the fortress. Notably, at the time, no one else within the Matsumae clan possessed such militarily derived knowledge from outside Japan. In recognition of Shume's contributions to the construction of the fort, the clan lord Matsumae Takahiro (松前崇広, 1829–1866) awarded him a permanent elevation in family status and the gift of two sets of seasonal clothing. This reward, personally bestowed by Takahiro, was an exceptional honor.

== Historical significance ==
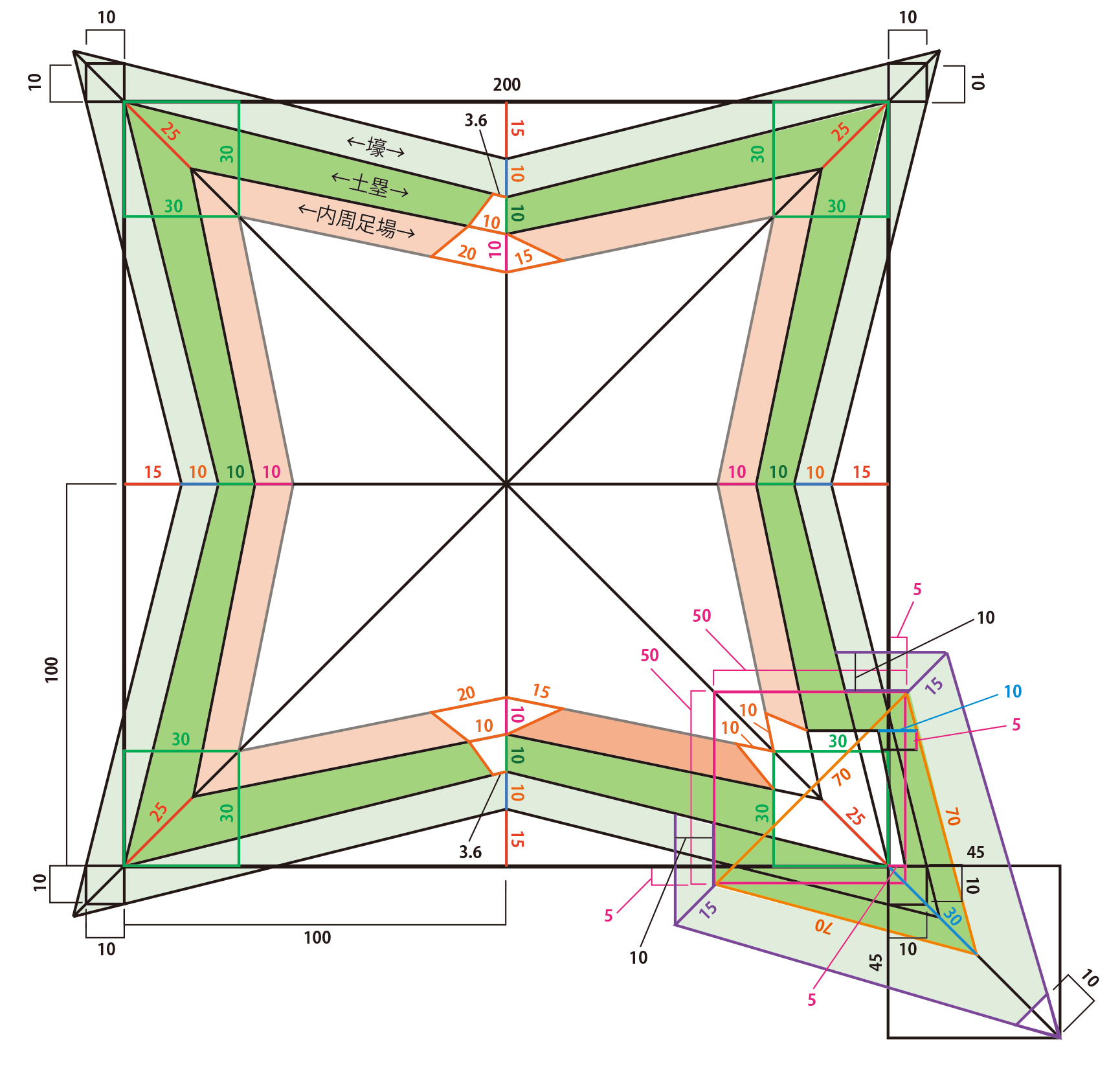
The geometric plan design of Hekirichi Bastion Fort, based on a square, derived from the archaeological analysis of the site's remains

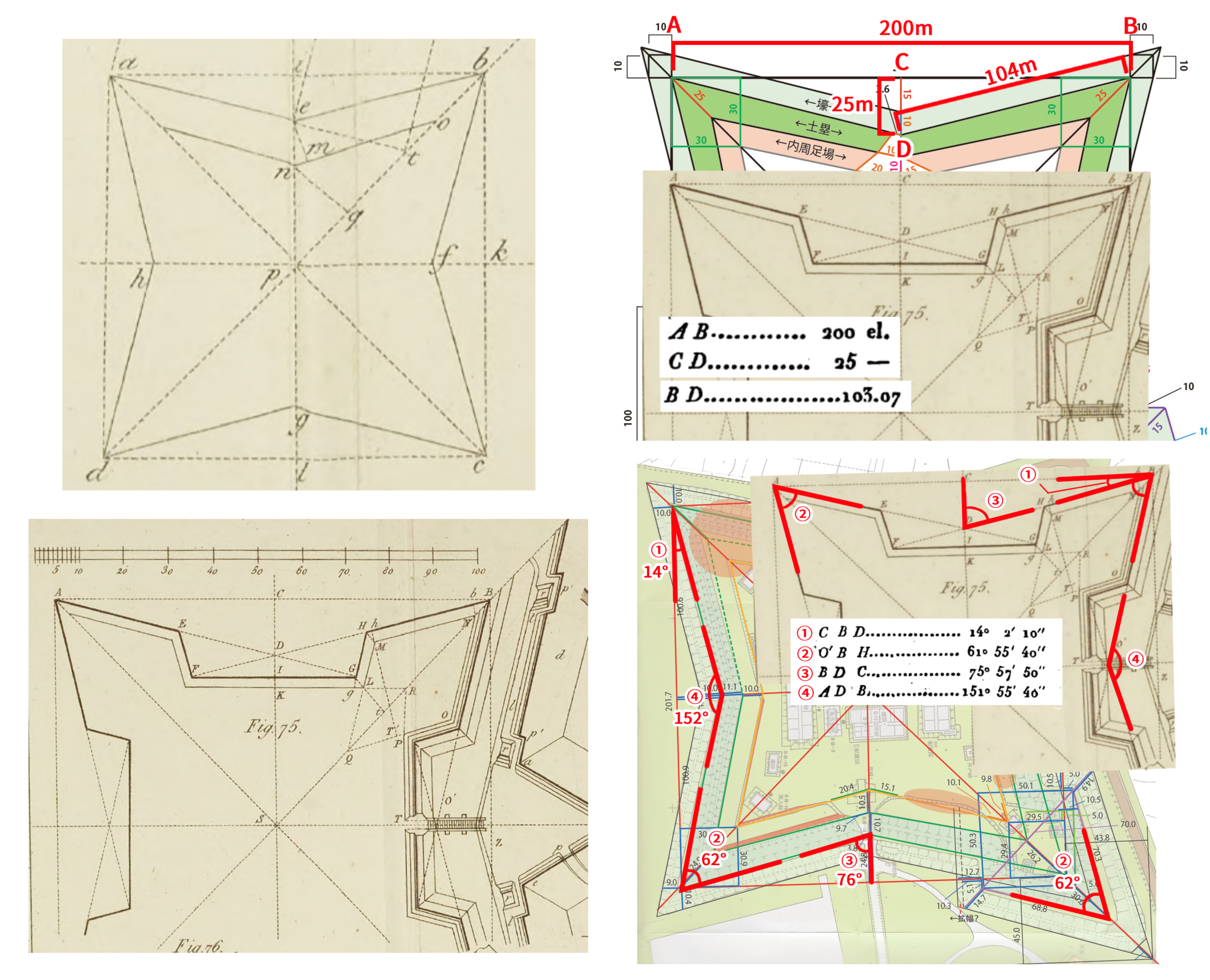
The schematic diagram, dimensions, and angles of the Bastion Fort based on a square, as illustrated in Savart's textbook (1827), align with those of Hekirichi Bastion Fort. At the time in the Netherlands, during the transition to the metric system, 1 el was treated as equivalent to 1 meter.

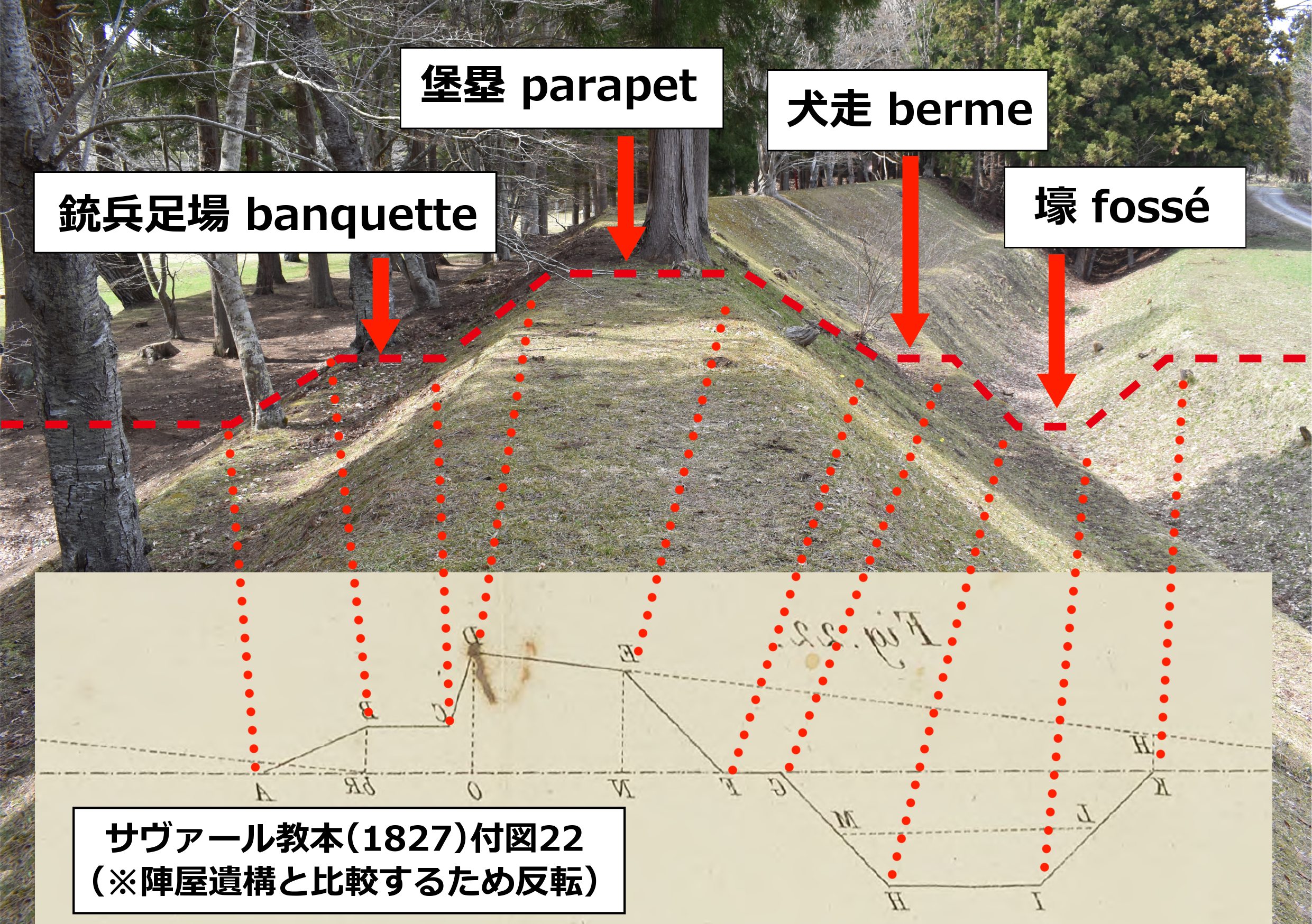
Comparison of the Extant Remains of Hekirichi Bastion Fort with the Cross-Sectional Diagram of the Outer Defense Structure in Savart's Textbook (1827)

The plan of the main bastion has been lost. However, in 2023, archaeological shape analysis of the existing remains by Tokita Taichirō, curator of the Hokuto City Hometown Museum, revealed that the design was based on a square with sides of just 200 meters (656 feet), (Note: Notably, the front length of Heirichi bastion fort, despite changes over time, has been maintained with an error margin of approximately 1 meter.) using its diagonals and bisectors as reference lines, and was executed using the metric system, which was not the standard surveying method in Japan at the time. (Note: The dimensions specified in the Savart textbook, which served as the design basis for the Hekirichi Bastion Fort, are based on the metric system, and as shown in the accompanying diagram, each part adheres to these measurements. The original French textbook uses meters as the unit of measurement, but the Dutch translation, reflecting the transitional period toward the metric system in the Netherlands at the time, replaces "meter" with the traditional Dutch unit "el" while maintaining equivalent values. This practice was also followed in Japan; for instance, in a 1852 letter by Sakuma Shōzan (佐久間象山), it is noted that el refers to three shaku and three sun (approximately 99.99 cm), and in 1855, Suzuki Shigemasa's (鈴木重正) Hojutsu Hitsuyo Ryouchi Sanpo (砲術必用 量地筭法) describes el as three shaku, two sun, nine bu, and two rin (approximately 99.90 cm).) Furthermore, the geometric design method, as well as the dimensions and angles of each part, were found to match the specifications of the model structure detailed in the chapter "Des Forts à bastions" (Dutch: Gebastioneerde Forten, bastion-style fortresses) in Cours élémentaire de fortification (first edition 1812) by Nicolas Savart (1765–1825), (Note: The textbook was reprinted until the 1830s and used as a teaching manual at the Saint-Cyr Military Academy. Even after the original author, Savart, was succeeded by later writers, the title Cours élémentaire de fortification continued to be used for the academy's fortification textbooks. The confirmed editions of Savart's textbook include the first edition of 1812, significantly expanded editions in 1825, 1828, and 1830, as well as a Dutch translation based on the 1825 edition published in 1827 (titled Beginselen der versterkingskunst), Italian translations confirmed in 1830, 1835 and 1836 (titled Corso elementare di fortificazione). In Japanese, Egawa Hidetatsu (江川英龍)'s retainer, Yatabe Keiun (矢田部卿雲, 1819–1857), translated the Dutch edition in 1853 under the title Keibijutsu Gen (警備術原).) used as a textbook for fortification studies at the French Saint-Cyr Military Academy, and its Dutch translation with additions by Frederik Petrus Gisius Nanning (1798–1832) Beginselen der versterkingskunst (1827) (hereinafter "Savart's textbook"). This Dutch translation was confirmed among the possessions of Sakuma Shōzan, Fujiwara Shume's mentor, and was also found in the library of Egawa Hidetatsu (江川英龍, 1801–1855), a pioneer of Western learning in the late Edo period under whom Shozan studied, as well as mentioned in correspondence by Date Munenari (伊達宗城, 1818–1892) (Note: From the same book, letters dated September 1846, October 5, 1846, December 14, 1846, June 2, 1847, and July 2, 1847, indicate that it was lent or cited as an official document of the shogunate to daimyo families. Additionally, it is confirmed that the book was part of the collections of Takashima Shuhan(高橋秋帆）, Miyake Tomonobu (三宅友信, the old lord of Sugamo), and Mizuno Tadakuni（水野忠邦） .) and listed in the architecture section of the Bansho Shirabesho Book Catalog Copy. This suggests that it served as an early text for Japan's Western-knowledge enthusiasts in the late Edo period to study European artillery defense.

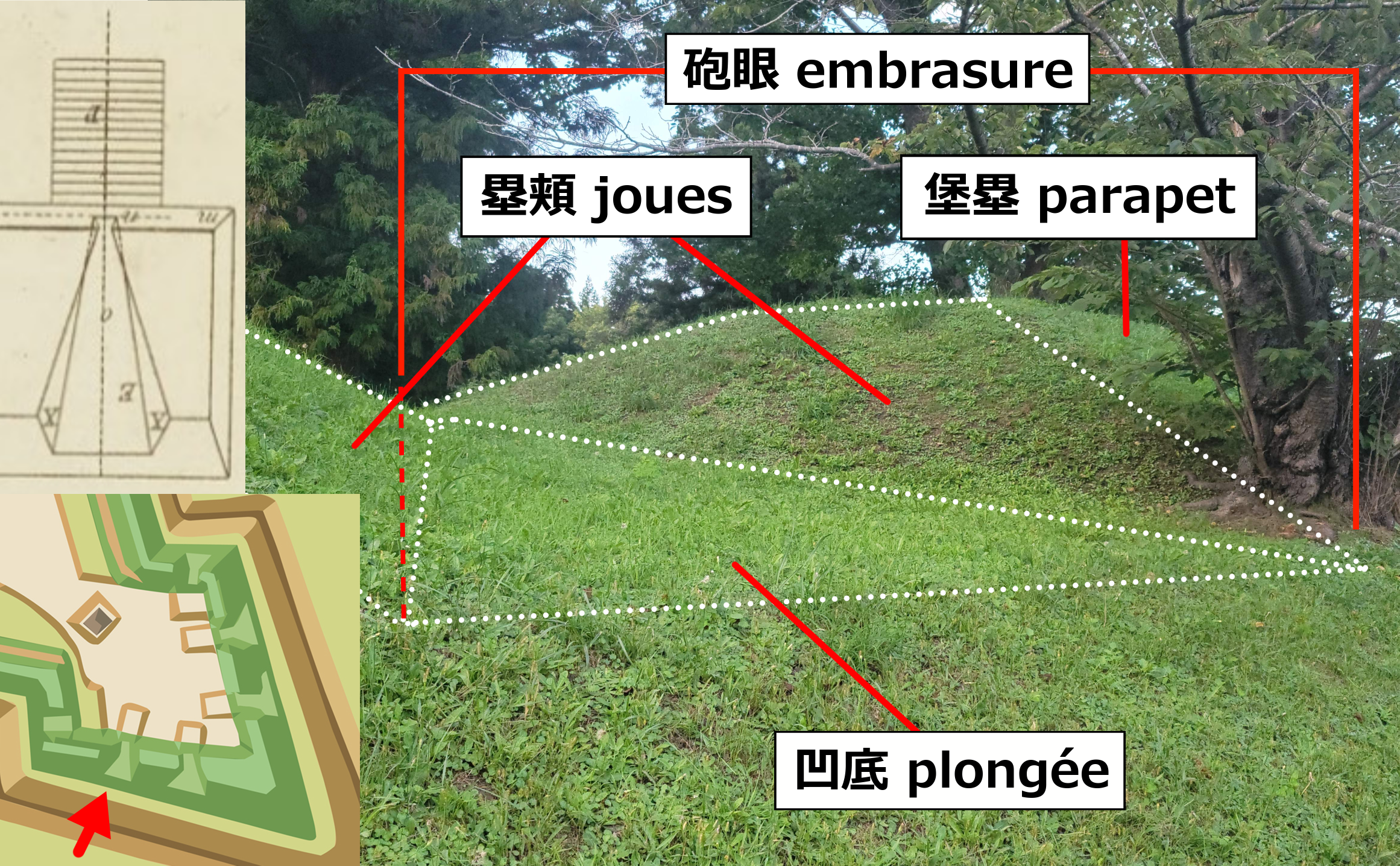
The gun emplacement of Hekirichi Bastion Fort (photographed from the position and direction indicated by the arrow in the lower left plan). It matches the structure depicted in the diagram from Savart's textbook.

In addition, the geometric cross-sectional structure (French/Dutch: profil) of the outer defenses, which seamlessly connects the earthworks (Note: N. Savart, 1825, Cours élémentaire de fortification, CHAPTER PREMIER: "Détermination du Profil lorsque la hauteur et l'épaisseur du parapet sont connues" (Chapter One: Method for Determining the Profile When the Height and Thickness of the Parapet Are Known), Chapter 55, p. 88. Thus, clearly defining the "profile" (cross-section) by multiplying the plan to create a three-dimensional structure was an essential element in fortification construction at the time.)—characterized by a riflemen's platform (French：banquette, Dutch：banket) installed along the entire inner perimeter of the ramparts—to the moat, as well as the gun emplacements, which meet the requirements for artillery batteries (砲台, Hō-dai, French：batterie, Dutch：batterij) in European military science of the time, include:

- Parapet (堡塁: Hō-rui, French：Parapet, Dutch：Borstwering) to protect soldiers and cannons within the enclosure.
- Cannon embrasures (砲眼: Hō-gan, French：Embrasure, Dutch：Embrasuren or schietgat) designed with an outward-expanding structure to allow cannonballs to pass through while providing a wide firing angle.
- Platforms for gun carriage (架台: Ka-Dai, French：plates-formes, Dutch：beddingen) to calibrate firing positions and prevent damage to the floor from the movement of gun carriages.

The gun emplacements of Hekirichi Bastion Fort correspond to the structure depicted in the diagram from Savart's textbook. These features reflect the application of 19th-century European defense construction theories, as outlined in Savart's textbook and others, designed for artillery operations.

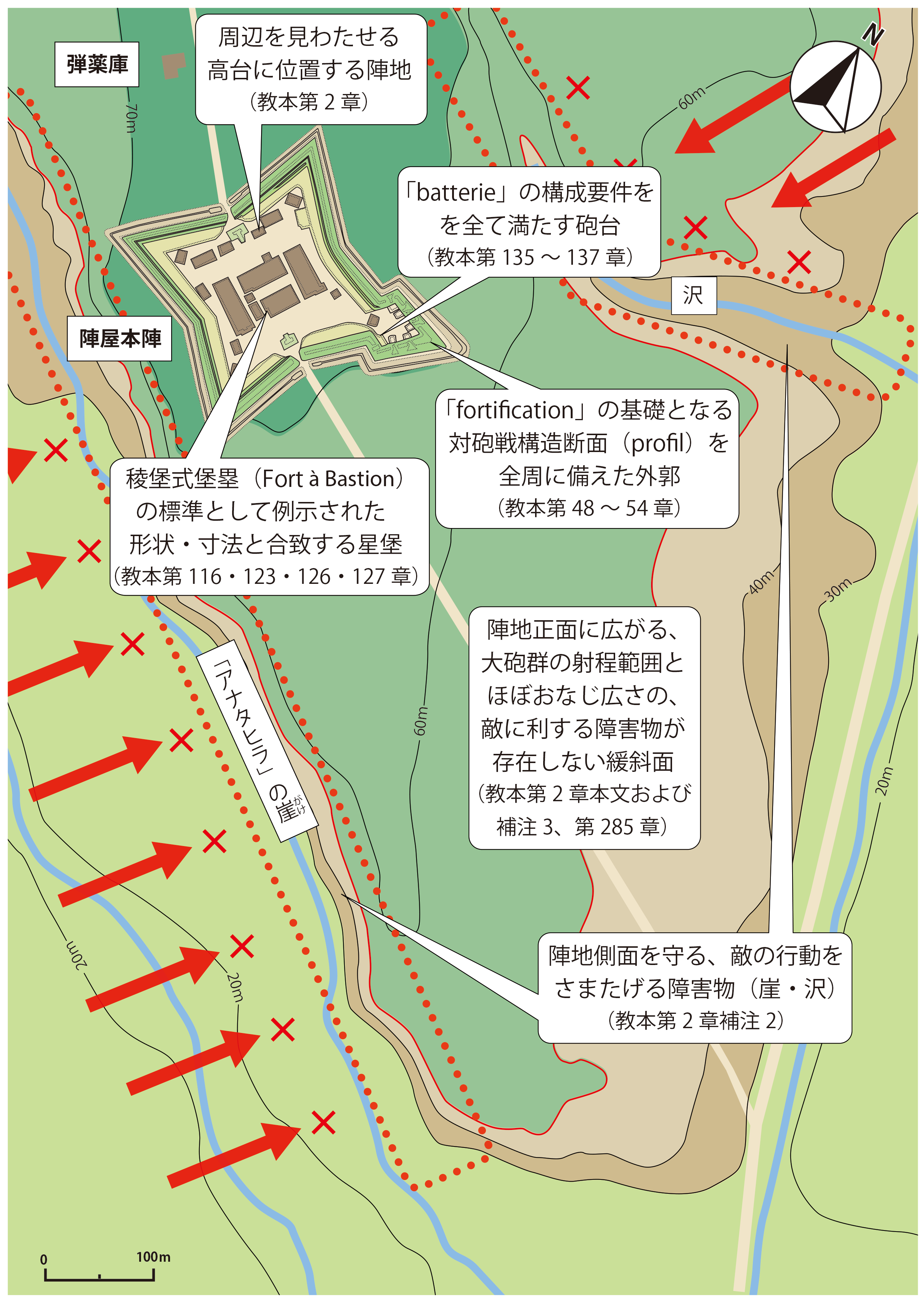
19th-century European military requirements observed in Hekirichi Bastion Fort and Nozaki Hill (chapter titles from Savart's textbook).

Furthermore, the placement of the main bastion at the top of the plateau, with cliffs and ravines blocking approaches from both sides and a long, gentle slope leading to the main entrance, aligns with the terrain principles described in Savart's textbook. For example, the following descriptions apply.

"Control the battlefield by dominating the range of cannons (at least within the range of rifles or grapeshot)... The elevated position (where the fortification is placed) must have a gently sloping incline in front, free of depressions or other invisible areas."

"The flanks of a military position should preferably be protected by obstacles that make enemy invasion difficult or necessitate detours for an attack. Such obstacles include dense forests, rivers or lakes, ravines, mountains, villages, or fortresses."

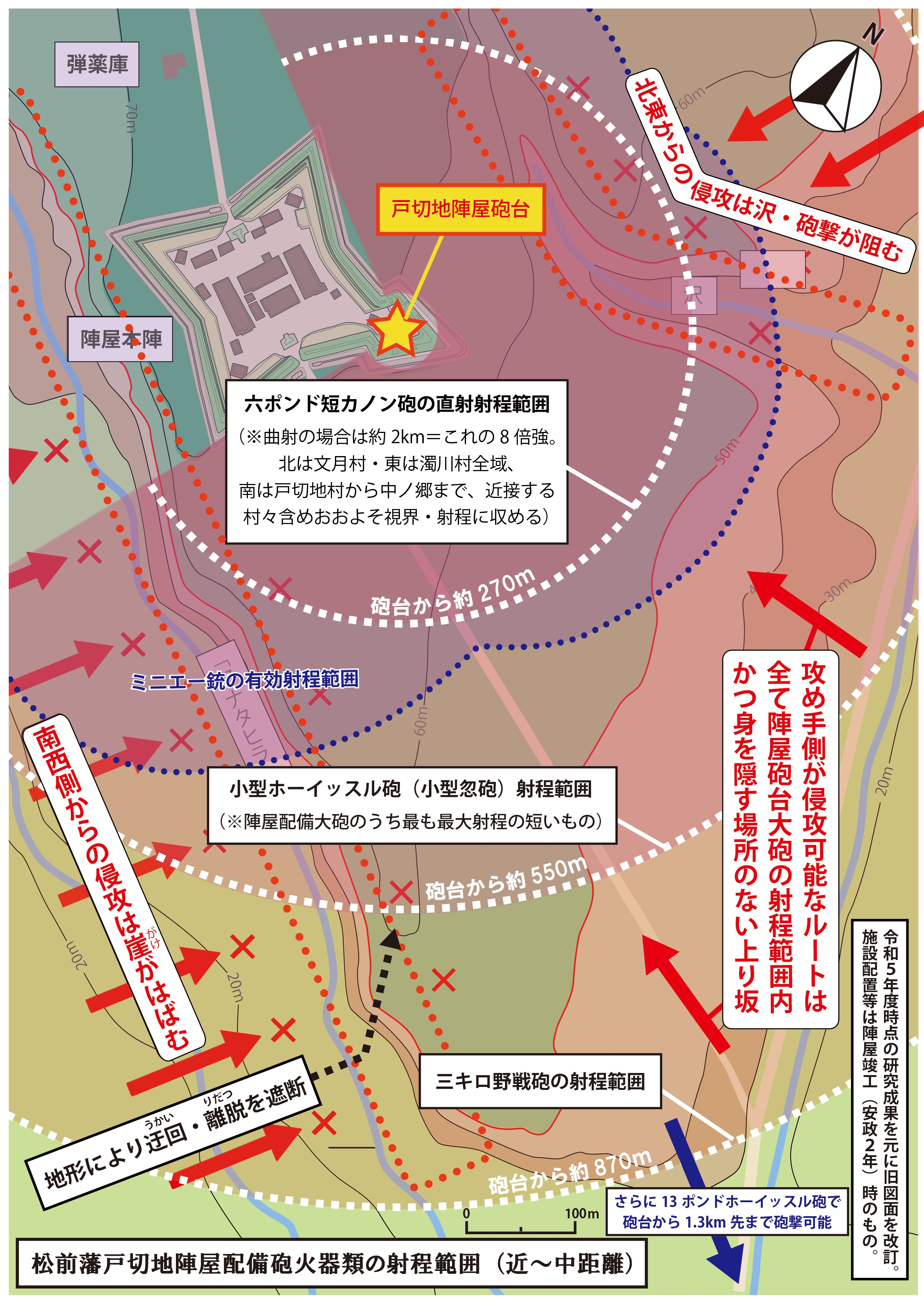
Defensive structure of Hekirichi Bastion Fort's deployed artillery fire control range and terrain

These conditions for a strategically advantageous artillery position were met, indicating that the construction of Hekirichi Bastion Fort strongly reflected European military theories learned in Japan through Dutch studies at the time. At least at the time of its construction, in the context of a newly opened Japan, it can be said to have been a defensive structure capable of countering potential external threats (such as military engagements or land battles following enemy landings) with technology on par with that of adversaries. (Note: At the time, Japan's military technology, influenced by a long period of national isolation, was significantly behind Europe in the scientific aspects of firearms and artillery.)

Hekirichi Bastion Fort Duty Reports (戸切地御陣家勤中御達書留, Hekirichi Go-Jinya Kinchū Go-Tassho Todome, 1859) lists the types and capabilities of the deployed cannons, including 6-pound short cannon, 3-kilogram field guns, and indirect-fire weapons such as 13-pound howitzers. Their range was sufficient to cover the entirety of Nozaki Hill within their firing zone. The estimation of this fire control range and the terrain conditions indicate that, in terms of the artillery capabilities of the time, the gentle slope in front of Nozaki Hill effectively became a "kill zone" with no escape for the attackers, with a total area calculated from the current terrain to be 355,000 square meters.

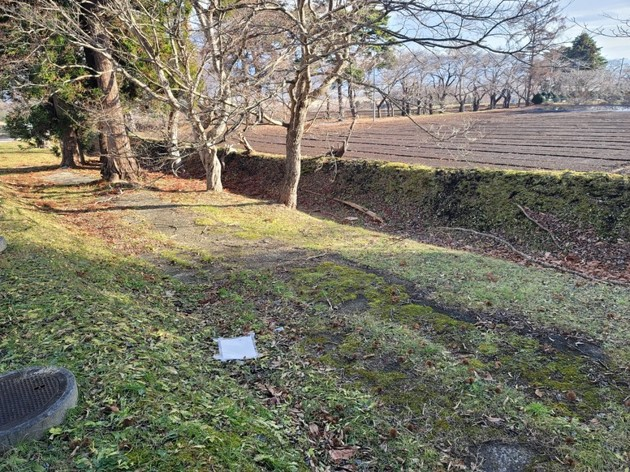
A surviving portion of the earthworks established when the slope in front of the Hekirichi Bastion Fort's main encampment was repurposed. Together with the samurai residences, these earthworks obstructed lines of fire, contributing to the impairment of artillery defense capabilities.

Additionally, a report submitted to the Hakodate Magistrate in 1861 indicates that the deployed artillery consisted of 27 cannons of four types for six gun emplacements, along with 59 rifles. This suggests a versatile arsenal tailored to the position and situation of approaching enemies, capable of handling contingencies such as main cannon malfunctions, as well as enabling wide-area deployment beyond the gun emplacements to the outer enclosure.

However, despite possessing a defensive structure aligned with European military principles, contact with foreign nations after Japan's opening to the West proceeded through peaceful negotiations rather than military means (at least in the northern regions), and Hekirichi Bastion Fort saw no combat opportunities following its construction. Furthermore, the presence of factions within the Matsumae clan that rejected Western-style artillery tactics, (Note: The clan lord's direct orders to transition to European military practices were rejected, with a steadfast adherence to traditional Japanese close-combat martial arts. At the very least, they received direct warnings from the clan lord, including threats of punishment, on two occasions in 1853 and 1856.(『湯浅此治日記』, Yuasa Koreharu Nikki). This persisted until the clan's final days, culminating in a coup that purged the Western-knowledge faction. (According to later appeals by those who condemned the coup leaders (『庚午弾劾録』, Kohgo dangai roku), Fujiwara Shume, the designer of Heirichi Bastion Fort, was driven to suicide during the coup on minor charges.) According to Volume 8 of 『北門史綱』(Hokumon Shikō), August 1868, after the coup, they established a new unit of close-combat specialists and positioned it as the mainstay of their forces (鎗劔隊, So-ken-tai, meaning "sword and spear team"), by the time of the Hakodate War (the final phase of the Boshin War), it is said that the clan faced opponents equipped with modern gear in a quaint, traditional samurai style (『松前懐古座談会』, Matsumae Kaiko Zadan Kai).) combined with the adoption in the same year as the aforementioned report of a proposal to use Nozaki Hill for soldier garrisoning and reclamation purposes, led to the construction of 24 samurai residences along the main approach and surrounding earthworks. As a result, the visibility of the gentle slope was impaired, significantly diminishing the fort's artillery capabilities

== Inner enclosure structures ==
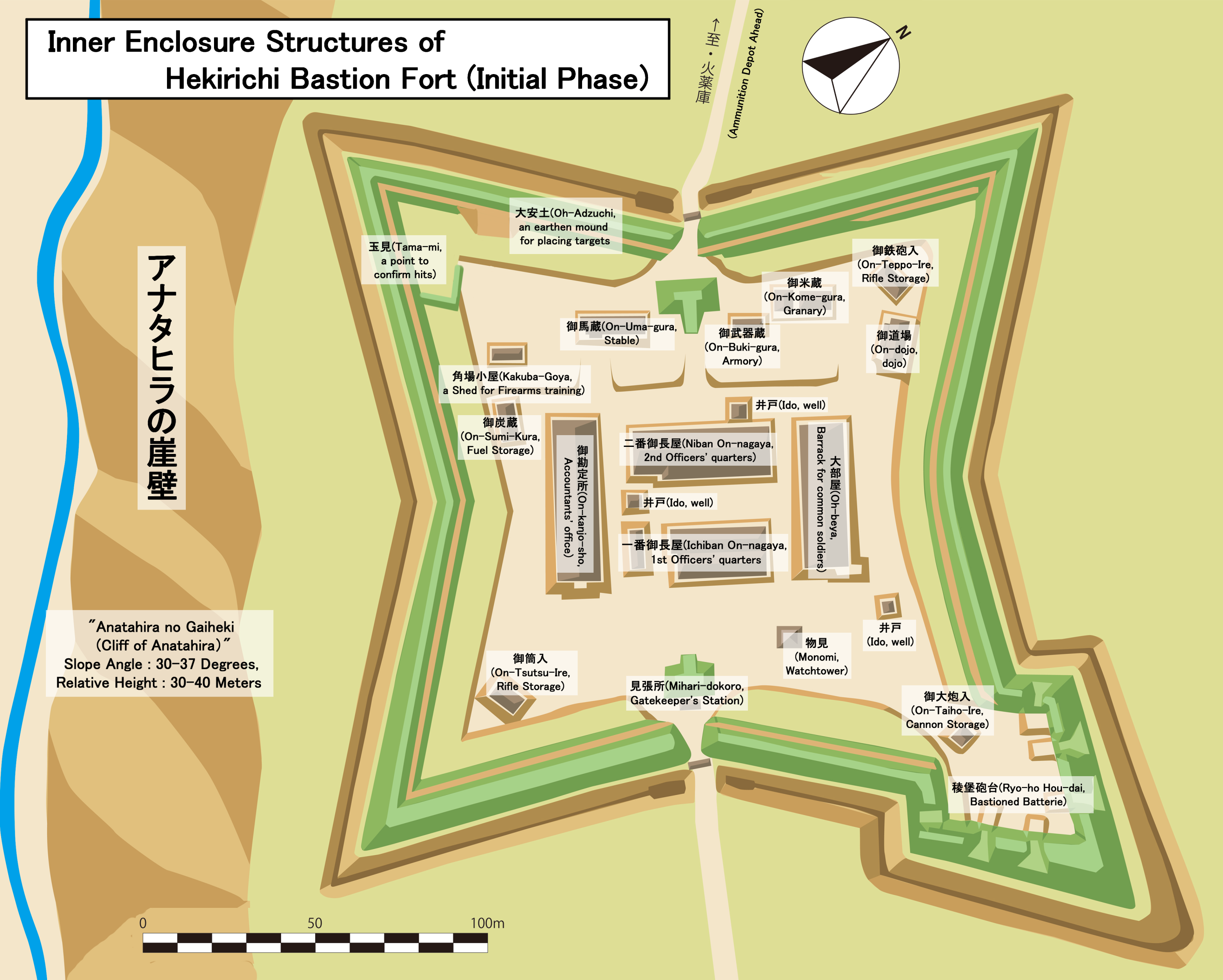
Inner enclosure structures of Hekirichi Bastion Fort (initial phase)

Existing historical diagrams and archaeological excavations have revealed that up to 17 buildings were present within the inner enclosure of Hekirichi Bastion Fort. The oldest known diagram, Anatahira Matsumae Bastion Fort Floor Plan (アナタヒラ松前陣屋絵図面, Anatahira Matsumae Jinya Ezumen) held by the Hakodate City Central Library, depicts 16 buildings at the time of construction, including features at the western bastion corner such as 角場小屋 (Kakuba-goya) (a shed for firing firearms), 大安土 (Ō-Adzuchi) (an earthen mound for placing targets), and 玉見 (Tamami) (a crank-shaped earthwork used to confirm hits), indicating the presence of a firearms training ground within the enclosure. This structure and layout are significant examples for studying the configuration of firearms training grounds in late Edo-period Japan.

However, in later diagrams presumed to be from subsequent periods, this training ground is absent. During excavations conducted for site preservation, traces of another building were found overlapping the training ground's firing line, and no remains related to 大安土 (Ō-Adzuchi) or 玉見 (Tamami) have been found. This suggests that at some point during the fort operation, firearms training may have been discontinued, and the space repurposed for new buildings. (Note: According to Ochiai Haruhiko (1937–2022) a local historian who long led regional history research, as cited in his lifetime statements, there was "a mound of earth on the inner side of the western bastion, steep enough to climb up and down" (Hokuto Iseki Monogatari, Episode 16, 2025; this mound no longer exists, having been leveled). Alternatively, it is possible that the 大安土 (Oh-Adzuchi) (earthen mound for target placement) alone, regardless of its original purpose, may have survived until the mid-20th century.)

According to the Hekirichi Bastion Fort Guidelines (戸切地御陣屋心得書, Hekirichi Go-Jinya Kokoroe-sho), buildings related to residence and administrative duties included: the 1st officers' quarters (一番御長屋, Ichiban On-nagaya), where the commander was stationed; the 2nd officers' quarters (二番御長屋, Niban On-nagaya), where retainers were stationed and which also housed a medical facility; the accountants' office (御勘定所, On-kanjo-sho); and barrack for common soldiers(大部屋, Ō-beya) for lower-ranking foot soldiers and attendants, all allocated within four longhouses situated at the center of the inner enclosure. A comparison of multiple historical diagrams shows that the allocation of these rooms varied over time. Additionally, the enclosure contained storage facilities for books, food, cannons, and firearms, as well as a dojo, stables, guardhouses, watchtowers, a bathhouse, and wells.

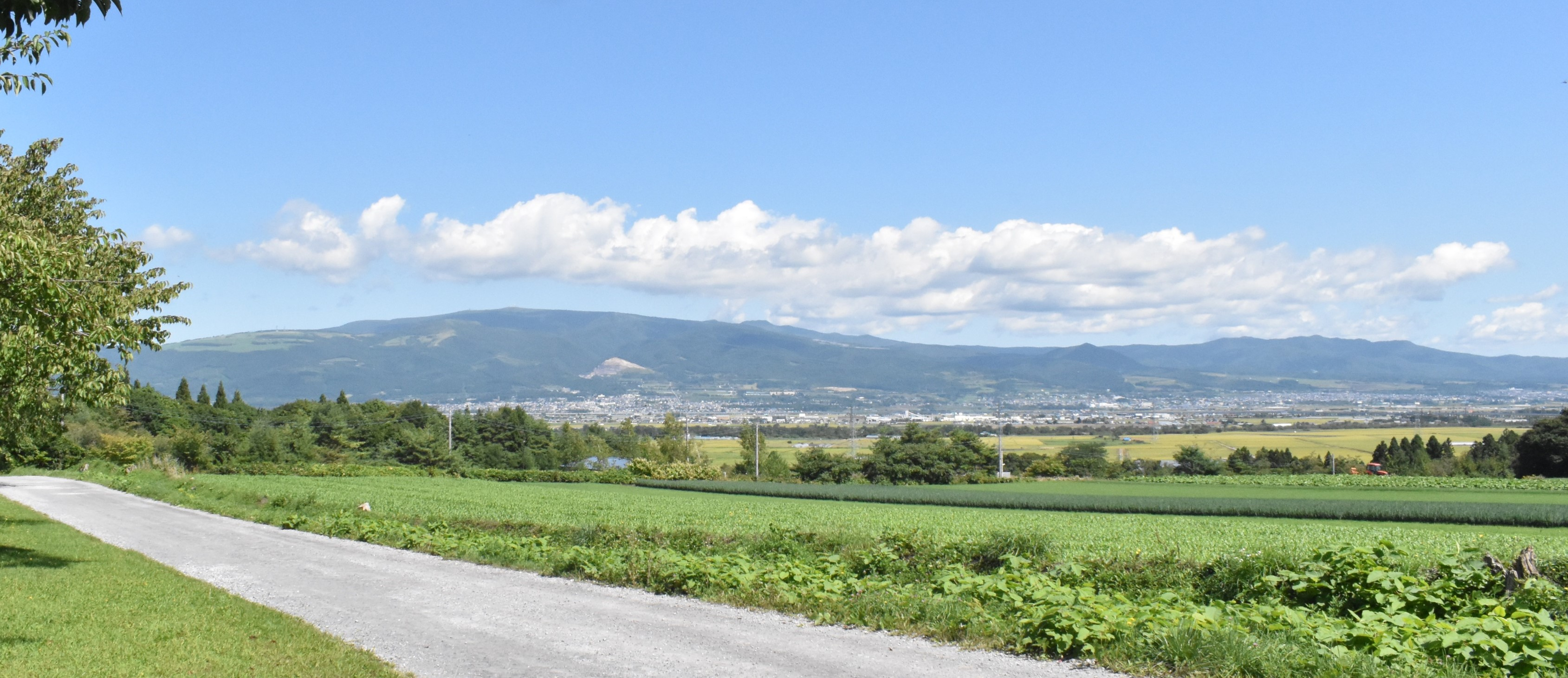
The view to the northeast from Hekirichi Bastion Fort. A gentle slope extending about 1 km spreads out in front, offering a wide view of the Hakodate Plain, which was the area assigned for surveillance.

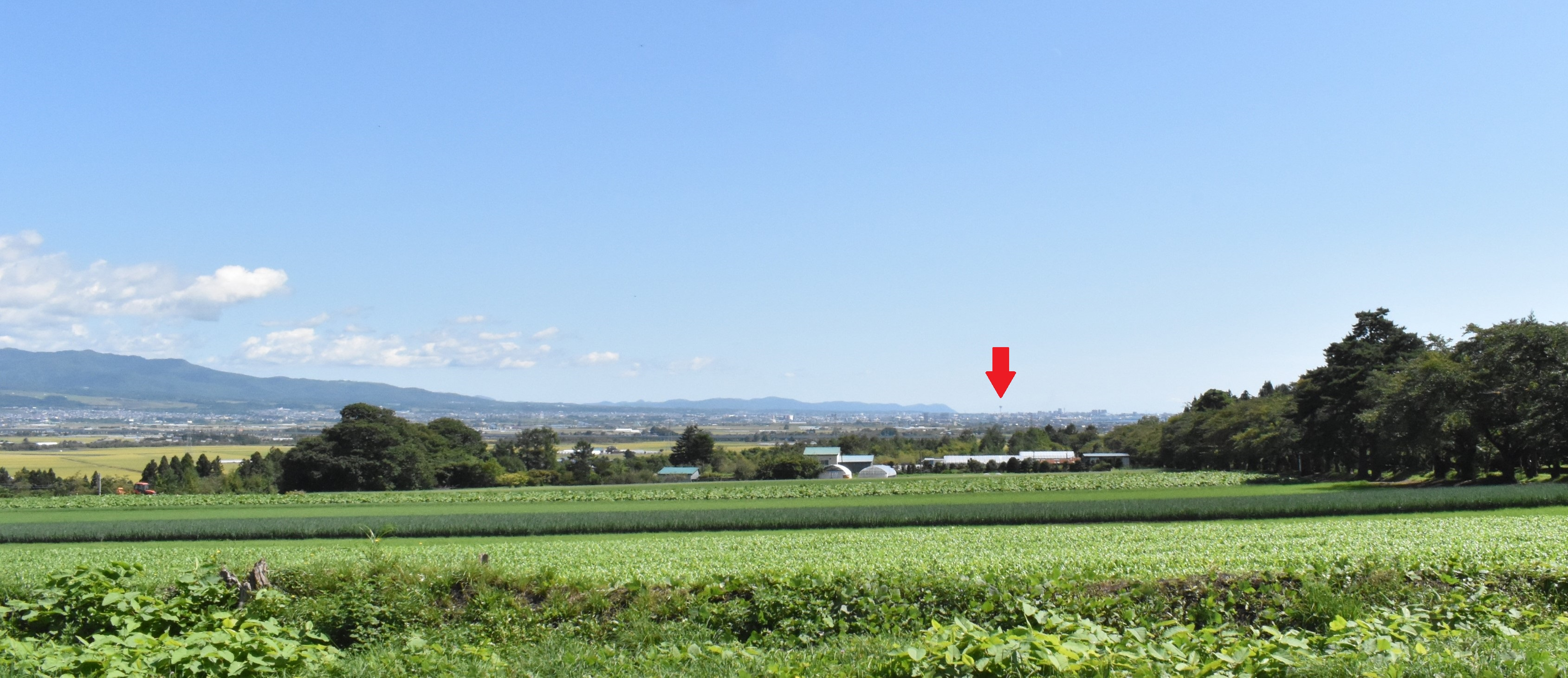
The view to the east from Hekirichi Bastion Fort. A gentle slope extending about 1 km spreads out in front, with Goryokaku located almost directly ahead (red arrow).

The deployed personnel are estimated to have numbered between 120 and 160, including commanders, retainers, foot soldiers, and lower ranks, who served on a rotating basis. According to historical diagrams, rooms were also allocated for intermediaries handling miscellaneous tasks. Later, in response to the aforementioned reclamation plan, Matsumae clansmen relocated with their families, settling along the main approach, using the surrounding land for agriculture while concurrently performing military and farming duties. After the Meiji Restoration in 1868, when Shimizutani Kinnaru (清水谷 公考, 1845–1882) assumed the role of Hakodate Prefecture Governor and took residence at Goryōkaku, troops from Hekirichi Bastion Fort were dispatched on rotation in May, following Shimizutani's orders, to assist in its defense. The Record of Fallen Matsumae Clan Members (『旧館藩士族殉難調, Kyū Tate-han Shizoku Junnan Shirabe), which documents Matsumae (Tate) clan warriors who died in the Hakodate War, includes an entry for Matsumae clansman Takahata Kiroku (高畑 喜六, 1818–1868), noting that he relocated with his family to the fort in 1862 and was dispatched as part of the Goryōkaku defense force from July to September in 1868 in response to a request from the Hakodate Prefecture. Hekirichi Bastion Fort primarily functioned as a guard post for the Hakodate Plain, leveraging its advantageous views and terrain, as well as serving as a garrison for stationed personnel. Additionally, it played a complementary role to the Hakodate Prefecture and Goryōkaku, which lacked significant military capabilities. Furthermore, in 1864, it handled administrative tasks such as acting as an intermediary for the residency endorsement of a person who had left their family registry, having moved from Kubota (present-day Akita Prefecture) and served for seven years. This suggests that it also assumed some degree of administrative discretion as a sub-office in internal affairs.

== Hakodate War (1868) and abandonment ==
In 1868, during the Hakodate War sparked by the landing of shogunate remnants in Ezo, the Hekirichi Bastion Fort garrison responded to a request from the Hakodate Prefecture on October 22, sending reinforcements to Goryōkaku. However, they suffered consecutive defeats in a night assault at Tōge-shita (峠下の夜襲, October 23) and the Battle of Nanae (七重の戦い, October 24), retreating without returning to the fort. The Matsumae clan's "spear and sword unit" (鎗劔隊, So-ken-tai), sent as reinforcements from their main base, was also decisively defeated in the Battle of Ōno-guchi (大野口の戦い, October 24) and retreated without stopping at the fort. On the same day, observing the approach of a patrol unit led by Takigawa Mitsutarō (滝川充太郎, 1850–1877) and Honda Koshichirō (本多幸七郎, 1845–1905) under orders from Ōtori Keisuke (大鳥圭介, 1833–1911), who had driven out the new government's allied domain forces at Ōno, the few remaining soldiers set fire to the fort's buildings and retreated without engaging in combat. During this event, Takigawa's unit seized two cannons, 150 bales of rice, and other ammunition.

After the Hakodate War, in 1900, the site of Hekirichi Bastion Fort came under the ownership of the Iwafune family, a prominent Hakodate merchant family known for creating Kōsetsu-en (香雪園, Kosetu Garden). In 1904, cherry trees were planted along the former main approach to commemorate victory in the Russo-Japanese War. Thereafter, this cherry blossom avenue established Hekirichi Bastion Fort as a renowned scenic spot, contributing to its later preservation.

== Current state ==
On March 18, 1965, Hekirichi Bastion Fort was designated a National Historic Site of Japan under Historic Site Criterion 2 (Castle Ruins). The designated name, reflecting the official title used by the Matsumae clan, was Hekirichi Bastion Fort of Matsumae Clan (松前藩戸切地陣屋跡, Matsumae Han Hekirichi Jinya Ato). (Note: During the Edo period, Heirichi Bastion Fort was also informally referred to as "松前陣屋, Matsumae Jinya," "濁川陣屋, Nigorikawa Jinya," and "文月陣屋, Fumizuki Jinya." In modern times, since the 20th century, it has sometimes been called "清川陣屋, Kiyokawa Jinya," a name derived from a new place name that emerged after the fort's abandonment.)

Following its designation as a historic site, Kamiiso Town (now Hokuto City) acquired the site as municipal property in 1977. To protect the site and facilitate its utilization, archaeological excavations and environmental maintenance were conducted starting in 1979 with subsidies from the national and prefectural governments. The excavations confirmed the discovery of building remains within the inner enclosure, aligning closely with historical diagrams, and unearthed approximately 65,000 artifacts, primarily household items from the late Edo period. These findings substantiated the operation of Hekirichi Bastion Fort as an outpost of the Matsumae clan.

However, the findings at that time were limited to administrative functions, and no exploration was conducted regarding the military aspects, particularly the structures, functions, and theories of European origin.

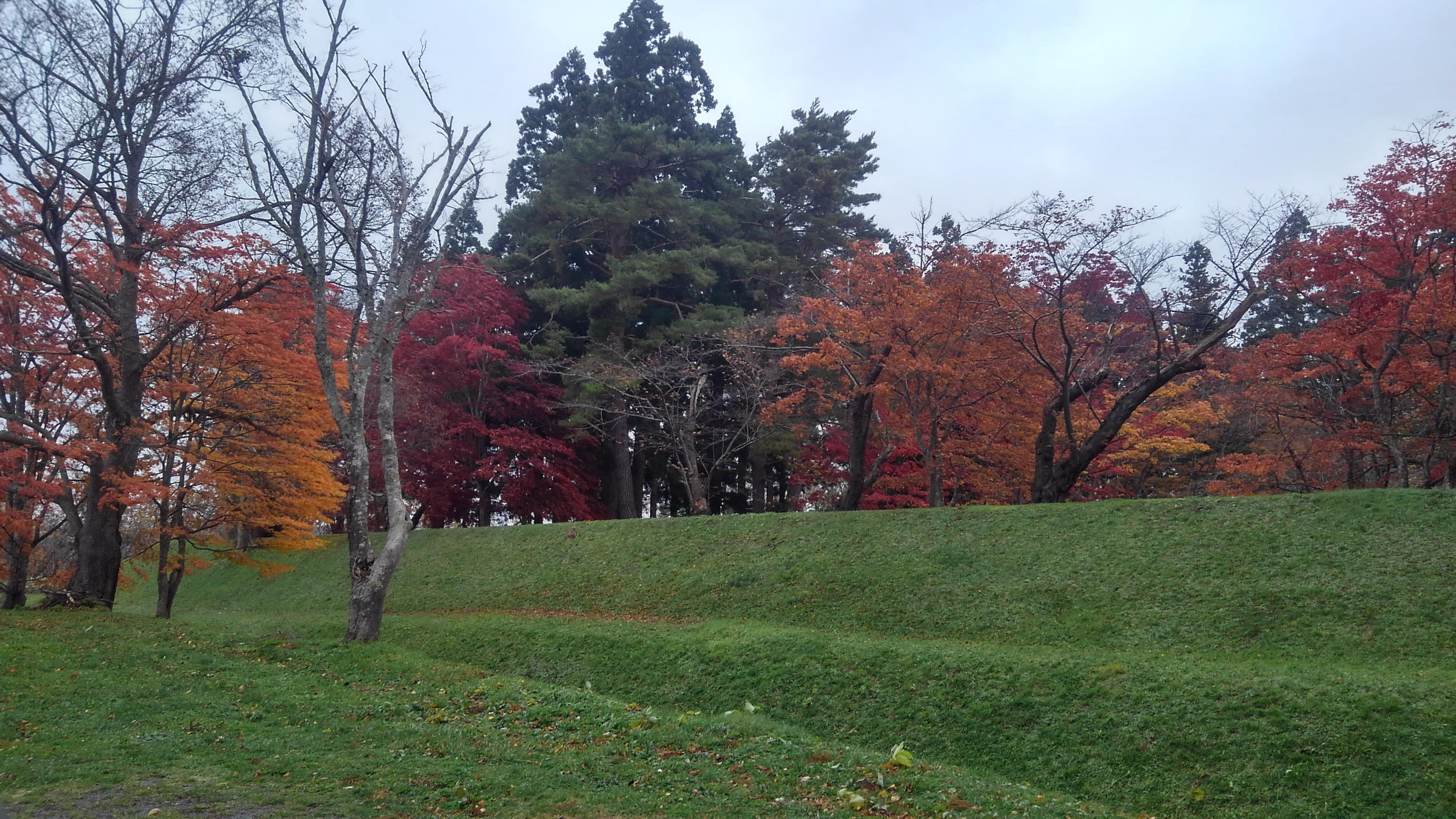
The main encampment of Hekirichi Bastion Fort during the autumn foliage season (viewed from the outside).

Following the archaeological excavations, park development projects commenced, culminating in their completion in 2001. The open spaces and plazas surrounding the star-shaped main bastion, along with the cherry blossom avenue planted in the Meiji era (commonly known as the "Cherry Tunnel"), serve as the venue for the annual Hokuto Bastion Fort Cherry Blossom Festival (北斗陣屋桜まつり, Hokuto Jinya Sakura Matsuri) held in May.

In 2007, as part of the second selection for the 100 Historical Parks of Japan, chosen to commemorate the 50th anniversary of the Urban Parks Law, Hekirichi Bastion Fort Park was included alongside Matsumae Park in the Matsumae Castle town.

The main star-shaped bastion, which forms the core of the historic park, retains its original earthworks and moats, allowing visitors to observe a structure that meticulously reflects 19th-century European military theory in its details. In particular, the artillery batteries at the bastion sections, consisting of parapets up to 10 meters thick at the base, outwardly flared embrasures, and gun emplacements with platforms once used for calibrating cannon positions, were built in strict adherence to the European military doctrines of the period. The preservation of these remains in near-original condition is unparalleled in Japan. (Note: In terms of the combination of a "fully preserved star-shaped bastion fort" and an "artillery battery with fully intact gun emplacements", it is the only one of its kind in Japan.) In Japan, due to institutional restrictions on castle construction, practical examples of 19th-century European military theory applied to land warfare during the late Edo period are significantly fewer compared to coastal defense batteries.

Since 2018, Tokita Taichirō, a curator at the Hokuto City Hometown Museum, has been conducting ongoing re-evaluative research on Hekirichi Bastion Fort, focusing particularly on its connections to European military theory. The first issue of the museum's bulletin, published in January 2024, includes a comprehensive paper summarizing these research outcomes and the re-evaluation of Hekirichi Bastion Fort.

== 4-star-shaped bastion style ==
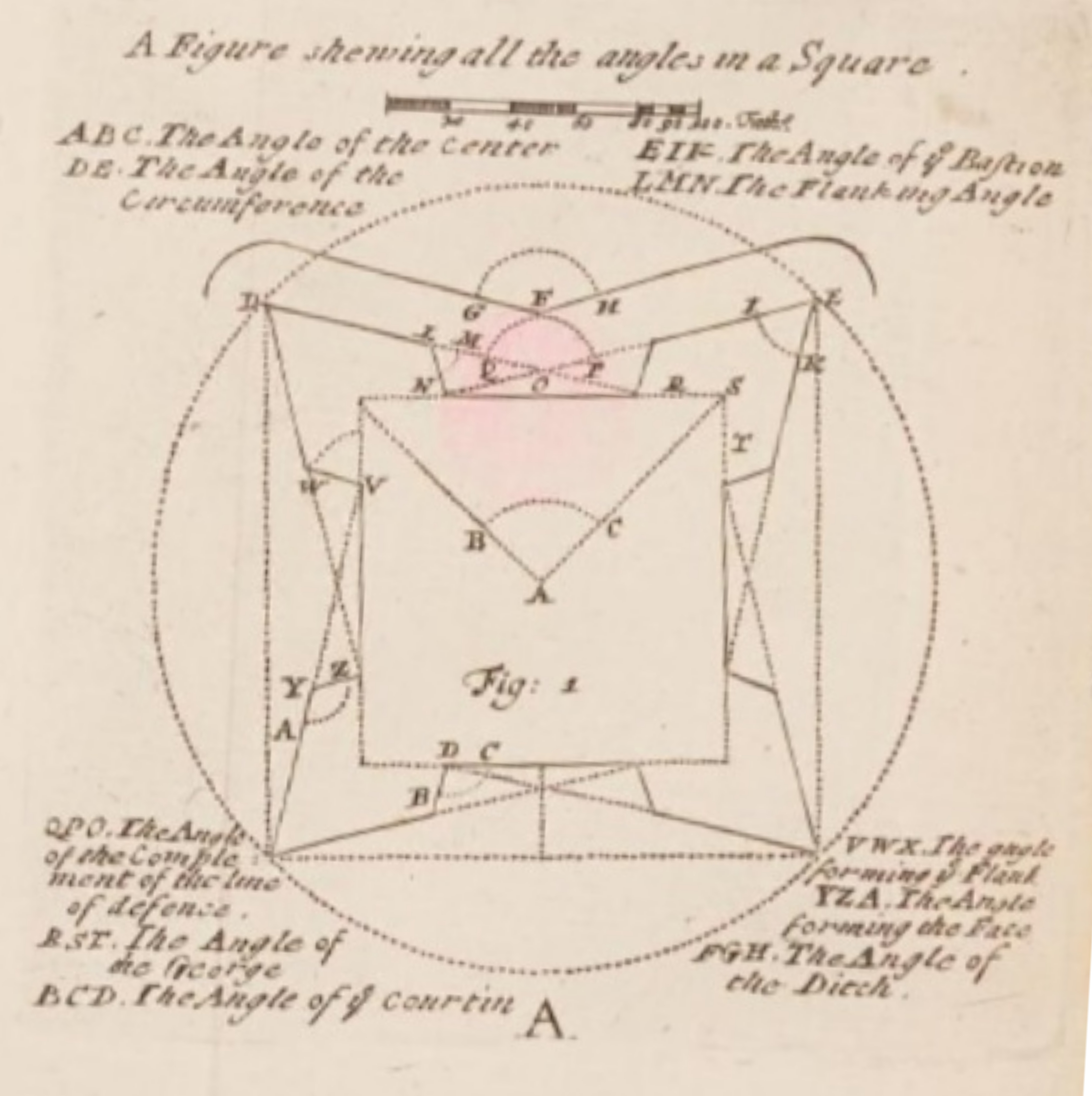
A schematic diagram of the design of a 4-star-shaped Bastion Fort based on a square, derived from geometric analysis., at Vaunban's"Nouveau traité de géométrie et fortification" (1691).

Hekirichi Bastion Fort is classified among bastion forts as a so-called 4-star-shaped bastion fort. This type of bastion forts are characterized by four "salient angles", with at least one incorporating a bastion as a defensive structure defined simply as a structure with (1) two fronts, (2) two flanks, (3) functioning as a gun platform, or (4) a structure that meets the aforementioned conditions and is divided in half, namely a half-bastion.

In 2025, the analysis of data collected from approximately 1,000 bastion forts worldwide revealed that 40% of bastion forts are atypical, not taking the so-called star-shape, (Note: In other words, a "Star fort" is categorized based on its overall star-shaped form, while a "Bastion fort" is categorized based on the presence of bastions in its defensive structure, and that these are not necessarily synonymous.) while of the remaining 60% that are star-shaped bastion forts, about half are 4-star-shaped bastion forts.

The analytical and geometric systematization of conventional bastion fort construction techniques, undertaken throughout the 17th century by military researchers including Vauban, his mentor Pagan, and his disciple Cambray, culminated in the work Nouveau traité de géométrie et fortification. In this text, the foundational step for the geometric design of "newly built" forts, as opposed to "reinforced" ones, was identified as the regular polygon that is the easiest and simplest to draw: the square.

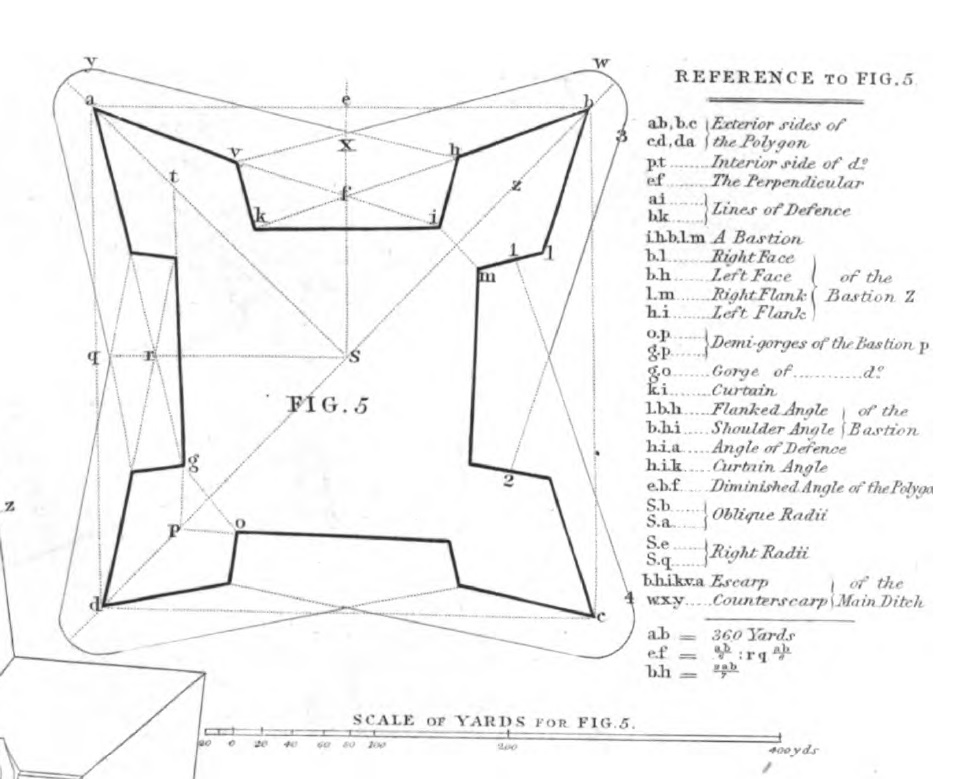
The geometric 4-star-shaped Bastion Fort based on a square, as depicted in H. Straith's "Treatise on Fortification and Artillery" (1848).

This simple answer, even before Vauban and others geometrically substantiated it, is evidenced by the fact that by the third quarter of the 17th century, before Vauban began his prominent work, 549 out of the 1,005 currently identified bastion forts had already been constructed, of which 169 (30.7%) were 4-star-shaped bastion forts. The square enclosure is the simplest polygonal defensive wall. This straightforward construction method of adding bastions to the four corners can be seen as the most "buildable" approach for forts of all sizes.

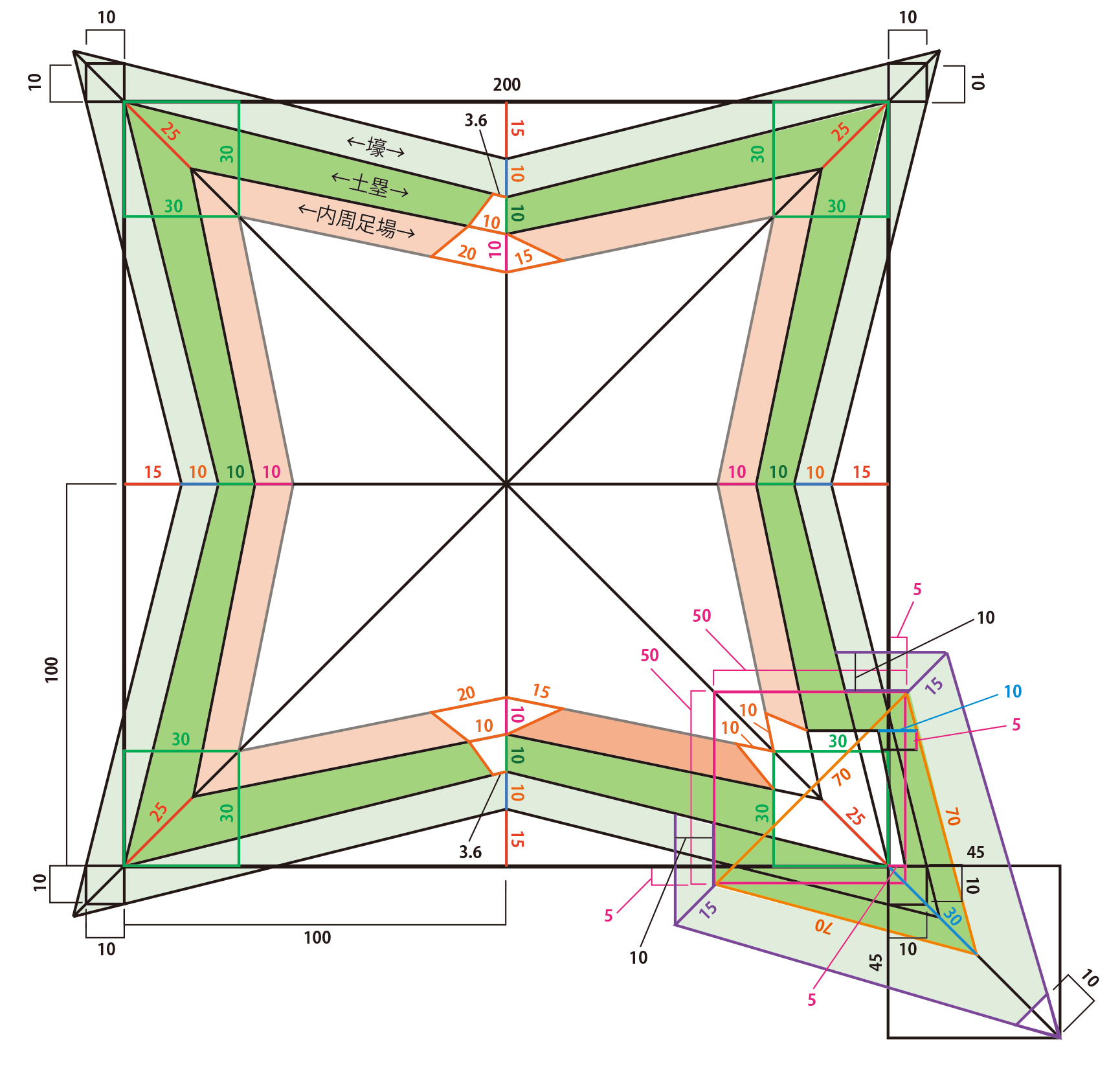
Geometric 4-star-shaped design of Hekirichi Bastion Fort (1855)

This design method, based on the "easiest to draw" regular polygon, combined with the elucidation of its geometric structure, served as the "foundation of design" for bastion forts. Approximately 150 years later, it continued to be passed down and expounded upon in the works of fortification instructors at the Saint-Cyr Military Academy, such as Nicholas Savart, and those who followed him, like Jean-Baptiste Imbert (1819–1917) and Amand Rose Émy, as well as in texts like Hector Straith's (British) Treatise on Fortification and Artillery (1848) and C.M.H. Pel's (Dutch) Handleiding tot de kennis der versterkings-kunst, ter dienste van onderofficieren (1849).

The construction of Hekirichi Bastion Fort coincided with an era marking the decline of bastion forts, which were overtaken and rendered obsolete by the evolution of artillery warfare. Amid this historical shift, the fort's main encampment was designed using the bastion-style, a European military approach for gunnery warfare that was still scarcely understood in Japan at the time. To achieve this within a limited timeframe, the "most efficient" square-based 4-star-shaped design was adopted. By concentrating the origin of artillery fire on a single bastion battery while aligning the terrain with fire control capabilities, Hekirichi Bastion Fort can be regarded as a fort unique to its era, harmonizing the intersecting technological systems of bastion-style fortification and long-range artillery warfare.
