= Yasuko Uetake =

Embroidery artist and Ainu cultural activist

- Born: Yasuko Muromura; November 26, 1934; Motomuroran (Sakimoricho), Muroran, Hokkaido
- Died: March 16, 2024 (aged 89)
- Education: Muroran Bunka Fashion College
- Occupation: Embroidery artist
- Years active: Late 1970s – 2024
- Organisation(s): Hokkaido Utari Association (1985–2012); Club for Talking about Mashiho Chiri (1988–2024); Women's Society for Learning and Inheriting the Ainu Culture (1998–2024)
- Known for: Preservation and promotion of the Ainu culture Ainu embroidery and folk costume design Teaching of traditional Ainu dancing
- Awards: Award of Excellence, Hokkaido Ainu Craftwork Contest (1994); Ainu Cultural Promotion Award (1997); Regional Award, Pola Award for Traditional Japanese Culture (2009); Hokkaido Cultural Property Protection Distinguished Service Award (2009); Ainu Cultural Award (2018); Commissioner for Cultural Affairs Award (2019)

External videos
- Waza vol 4 Yasuko Uetake – The Foundation for Ainu Culture

Yasuko Uetake (Japanese: 上武やす子, née Yasuko Muromura; 26 November 1934 – 16 March 2024) was an embroidery artist and an Ainu cultural activist from Japan. Born in Muroran, Hokkaido, she was a prominent figure in the preservation and promotion of the Ainu culture in Noboribetsu. She was active in the Noboribetsu Branch of the Hokkaido Utari Association, the Club for Talking about Mashiho Chiri, and the Women's Society for Learning and Inheriting the Ainu Culture. A self-taught but accomplished Ainu embroidery artist, she created various works in traditional Ainu clothing, trained younger artists in embroidery seminars, and taught other Ainu cultural traditions, including dancing.

== Early life ==
Yasuko Uetake was born as Yasuko Muromura in Motomuroran (currently part of Sakimoricho), Muroran, Hokkaido, on 26 November 1934. Her mother died when she was one and a half years old, and she was raised by her father, grandmother, and siblings. During her school years, she suffered verbal abuse due to her Ainu heritage, but she resisted discrimination with determination. After graduating from Muroran Bunka Fashion College, she married in 1960 and moved to Horobetsu (currently part of Noboribetsu).

== Cultural activism ==
In the late 1970s, Yasuko began her activism as an Ainu, triggered by the Noboribetsu Branch of the Hokkaido Utari Association's criticism toward the mayor of Noboribetsu, who had built a tomb for himself by destroying Ainu graves. From 1985, she served for six years as an Ainu living consultant at the Noboribetsu Branch of the Hokkaido Utari Association. She became head of the branch in April 1996, continuing her work until she retired from the post in 2005. She founded the Club for Talking about Mashiho Chiri, a study group with other members of the Noboribetsu Branch in 1988, and became head of the club in 1997. There were twelve Ainu language schools in Hokkaido, and she set up the 13th one. In 1998, she founded the Women's Society for Learning and Inheriting the Ainu Culture. She was welcomed and well received by local people when Ainu exhibitions were held in the United States.

== As an artist and educator ==
Her work as a consultant in the Hokkaido Utari Association inspired Yasuko to learn Ainu embroidery. Due to a stagnation of the branch's activities, no folk costume for traditional ceremonies were available, which made her to study distinct textile patterns in Ainu clothing and to sew garments for the preservation of the Ainu culture. She started an Ainu embroidery class for local citizens in 1990, founded Pirikanoka, a society for learning Ainu embroidery named after the Ainu word meaning a "beautiful form" in 1993, and held annual exhibitions for embroidery works. In 1997, she started a project to create faithful reproductions of traditional Ainu clothes from the late Edo period to the mid-Showa period in collaboration with 20 women in Sapporo and Iwamizawa. In 2008, souvenir albums were created for the world leaders visiting Toyako in Hokkaido for the 34th G8 summit, which were embroidered with traditional Ainu patterns designed by Yasuko and highly appreciated. In addition to embroidery, she taught traditional Ainu dancing to children in primary schools around Noboribetsu.

In the 2020s, she continued holding exhibitions and teaching as an Ainu embroidery artist. She died on 16 March 2024.

== Awards ==
- 1994 – Award of Excellence, Hokkaido Ainu Craftwork Contest, Education Award, Hokkaidō Prefectural Board of Education
- 1997 – Promotion Award, Hokkaido Ainu Craftwork Contest, Ainu Cultural Promotion Award
- 1998 – Jury Award, Hokkaido Ainu Craftwork Contest
- 2002 – Social Volunteer Award, The Soloptimist Japan Foundation
- 2009 – Regional Award, Pola Award for Traditional Japanese Culture, Hokkaido Cultural Property Protection Distinguished Service Award
- 2010 – Official Recognition for Cultural and Educational Contributions by Noboribetsu
- 2018 – Ainu Cultural Award
- 2019 – Commissioner for Cultural Affairs Award

== Works ==
- 上武やす子とピリカノカ (Uetake Yasuko and Pirikanoka). クルーズ. 2007. ISBN 978-4-905756-40-8.
