= Kathryn Woodard =

American pianist, scholar and educator (born 1969)

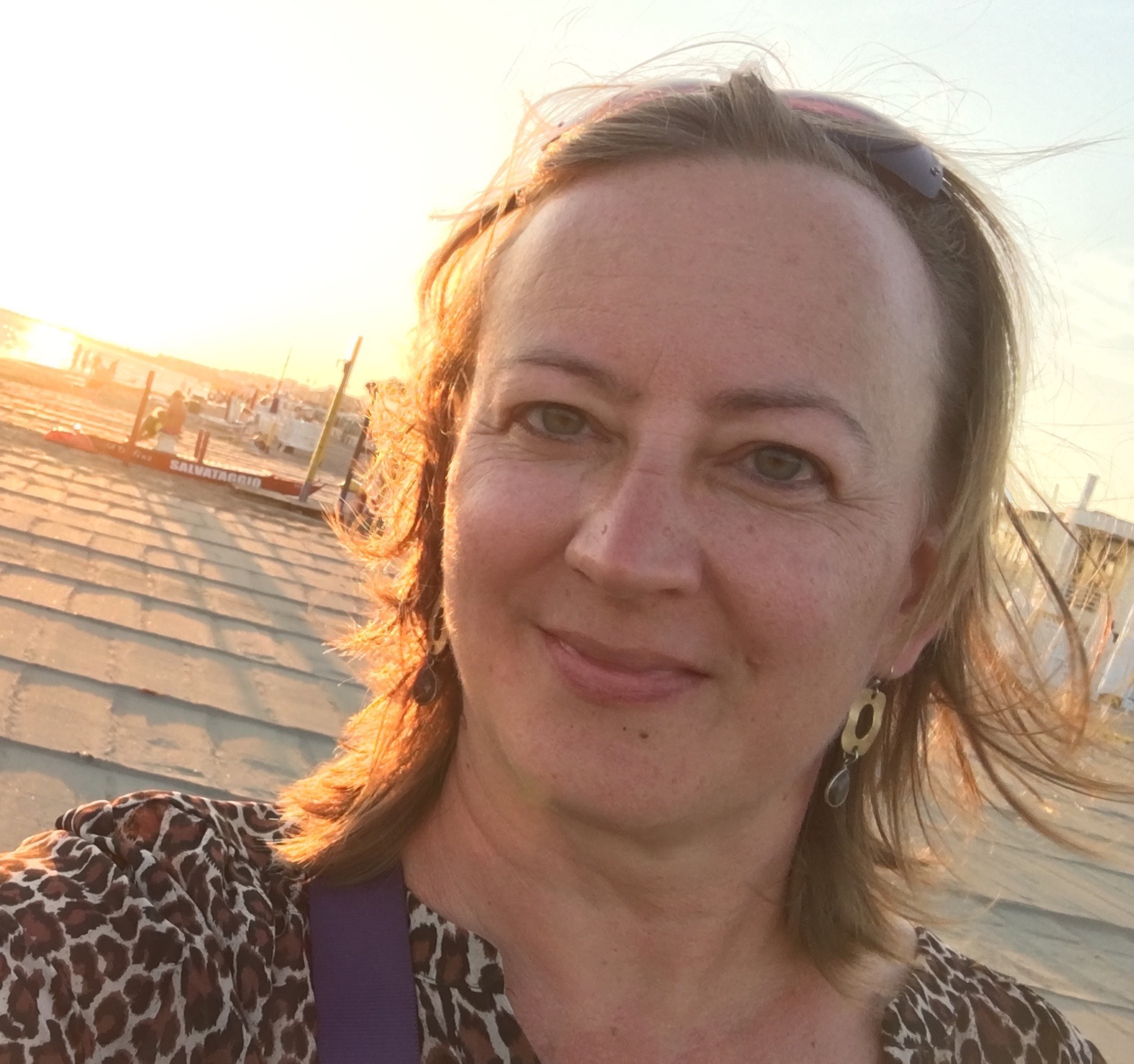
- Kathryn Woodard at Ostia (Italy), July 2018
- Born: 1969 (age 56–57); Dallas, Texas
- Education: University of Music and Performing Arts, Munich; University of Cincinnati College-Conservatory of Music
- Occupations: Musician, Educator
- Website: kathrynwoodard.com

Kathryn Louise Woodard (born 1969) is an American pianist, scholar, composer, and educator. Born in Dallas, Texas, she is recognized as an interpreter of music by composers from Turkey and East Asia. Her work as an educator has addressed issues surrounding musicians' health, specifically prevention and relief from injuries and an awareness of the complexity of musicians' movement and cognition.

== Career ==
After initial studies in Dallas with Betty Thomas and noted new music pianist, Jo Boatright, Woodard moved to Munich, Germany, where she continued studies with Yasuko Matsuda and later with Gitti Pirner at the University of Music and Performing Arts (Hochschule für Musik) in Munich. She pursued graduate studies at the University of Cincinnati College-Conservatory of Music with Frank Weinstock and Sandra Rivers. There she began a focus on new music and piano music by composers outside the Western tradition. At the same time, she began to learn the Alexander Technique to overcome physical limitations in her playing, studying primarily with Barbara Conable.

Woodard has collaborated as a pianist with numerous composers and choreographers, including Paula Matthusen, Allen Otte, Ge Gan-ru, Huang Ruo, and Beth Soll. In 2001, Woodard served as a consultant for Turkish music with the Silk Road Project to help identify composers for the Silk Road Ensemble to commission. From 2000 to 2004, she was adjunct assistant professor at Hunter College, and in 2004 she accepted a position at Texas A&M University in its fledgling music program. She worked as repetiteur and ensemble pianist for Opera Vista from 2010 to 2012 and performed several premieres, including The Silent Prince by Somtow Sucharitkul.

Woodard's scholarly research has focused on timbral experiments in piano music and on the works of Turkish composers such as Ahmed Adnan Saygun. More recent presentations have focused on the perception of rhythm and the process of learning rhythms. In addition to recordings on the New Albion and Albany record labels, she has released two recordings on her own label Sonic Crossroads. This entity is now an educational initiative promoting global piano music to students around the world through publications, classes and assessments. A series of digital publications launched in 2015 has brought the piano music of Turkish composers to a broader audience.

In recent years Woodard has increasingly focused on composing, including several sets of piano pieces intended as pedagogical repertoire. Other works include songs cycles, such as In einem Dasein and No One Knows the Time, premiered by vocalists Amanda Staub and Rachel DiBlasio of Liberty City Arts in Philadelphia. She is collaborating with Kendra Preston Leonard on an opera based on the novel Anna Edes by Hungarian author Desző Kostolanyi.

== Discography ==
- Ahmed Adnan Saygun: Piano Music, Albany Records 1168 (2010). (Solo recording)
- Journeys. With works by Hasan Uçarsu, Ivan Božičević, Kathryn Woodard, Paula Matthusen, Sansar Sangidorj, Eka Chabashvili, and Keiko Fujiie; Sonic Crossroads 02 (2009). (Solo recording)
- Silhouettes. With works by Muammer Sun, Kosaku Yamada, Qu Xiao-song, Umar Temor, Dmitri Yanov-Yanovsky; Sonic Crossroads 01 (2008). (Solo recording)
- “Four Studies of Peking Opera” for piano and strings by Ge Gan-ru. Recorded with the Shanghai Quartet for the album Lost Style – Ge Gan-ru, New Albion Records 134 (2007).

== Compositions ==
- Another Meaning: Two songs for high voice and B-flat clarinet with poetry by Fernando Pessoa (2025)
- No One Knows the Time: Three songs for mezzo-soprano and piano with poetry by Tina Chang (2025)
- In einem Dasein: Song cycle for high voice and piano with poetry by Georg Trakl (2024)
- Vignettes: Five rhythm studies for piano (2024)
- Four Scenes: Intermediate piano solos (2024)
- Whirlwinds Etude for piano (2023)
- Five to Seven Toccata for piano (2023)
- Impromptus Three pieces for piano (2022)
- The Calm Before... Two pieces for viola and piano (2019)
- Budapest 1919 Three songs for high voice, clarinet, viola and piano (2016/2019)
- Creepy Suite: Late elementary piano solos (2019)
- Ancient Omens: Three pieces for piano (2018); also arranged for wind ensemble (2023)
- Sights of Istanbul: Pieces for piano (2014)
- Glimmer: Chamber work for oboe, clarinet, cello and percussion (2010)
- Lyric Suite A set of improvisations for prepared piano (2008)
