= Paula Matthusen =

American composer

- Born: 1978 (age 46–47); Arizona, U.S.
- Occupation(s): Composer, educator
- Known for: Acoustic and electro-acoustic music composition

Paula Matthusen (born 1978) is an American composer of acoustic and electro-acoustic music and educator. She is a recipient of the Rome Prize from the American Academy in Rome.

== Biography ==
Paula Matthusen was born in 1978 in Arizona. She attended University of Wisconsin–Madison; and has a M.A. degree and Ph.D. from New York University.

Matthusen has taught music at Florida International University, Wesleyan University, and Columbia University. Her music has been performed by Bang-On-A-Can All Stars, International Contemporary Ensemble, Alarm Will Sound, Estonian National Ballet, Kathleen Supové, Todd Reynolds, and Kathryn Woodard.

== Discography ==
- the old language is the old language... (percussion duo, 2017)
- old fires catch old buildings (baritone, trumpet, bass clarinet, trombone, 2017)
- corpo/cage (2009)
- run-on sentence of the pavement (piano, ping-pong balls and electronics, 2003)
