= Hokuto City Hometown Museum =

- 北斗市郷土資料館
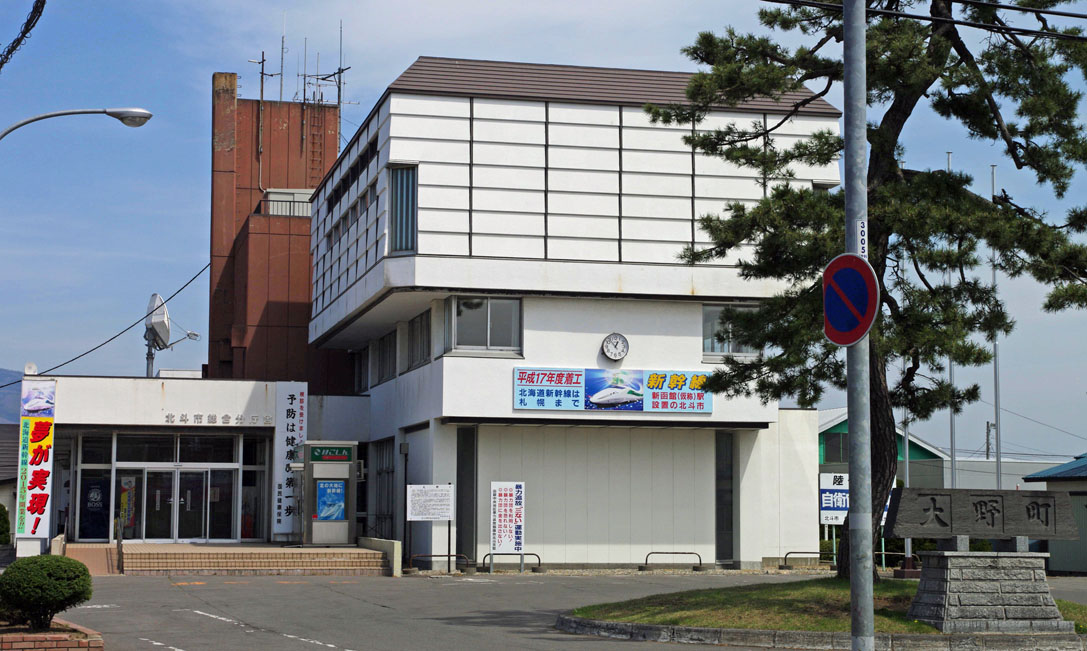
- The museum is located on the second floor of Hokuto City Hall General Branch Office
- Interactive map of the Hokuto City Hometown Museum area

General information
- Location: 1-1-1 Hon-chō, Hokuto, Hokkaidō, Japan
- Coordinates: 41°53′01″N 140°38′38″E
- Opened: 2006

Website
- Official website

Hokuto City Hometown Museum (北斗市郷土資料館, Hokuto-shi Kyōdo Shiryōkan) is a museum of local history in Hokuto, Hokkaidō, Japan that came into being after the city's formation in 2006. The museum is successor to the former Ōno Town Historical Museum (大野町郷土資料館), which had a collection of some five thousand items with a focus on agriculture, as Ōno is where rice-farming was brought to Hokkaidō. The collection of Hokuto City Hometown Museum includes artefacts from Yafurai-date that have been designated a Prefectural Tangible Cultural Property.

In 2019, the museum held an exhibition of finds from the ninety or so Jōmon-period sites identified to date in Hokuto, including the Moheji Site: a spouted earthenware vessel with a figured design excavated at Moheji (茂辺地), together with fragments of a number of other vessels decorated with figures of human and non-human animals, has been designated an Important Cultural Property and is now in the collection of Tokyo National Museum.

From 2018 to 2025, the museum focused on re-examining the historical and cultural assets of Hokuto City, particularly Hekirichi Bastion Fort of Matsumae Clan, a nationally designated historic site and Japan's first Western-style star-shaped bastion fortress. The research emphasized previously overlooked aspects of the practical application of contemporary European military theory, with findings shared through special exhibitions and public lectures. Although this project has now ended due to the retirement of the researchers who dedicated themselves to it, some of its results can still be seen in the permanent exhibition.

In addition to these efforts, since 2024, a research bulletin has been launched to publish research findings, which can be accessed online via the Nara National Research Institute for Cultural Properties' repository site, "全国文化財総覧、Comprehensive Database of Cultural Heritage in Japan."

== See also ==
- List of Cultural Properties of Japan - archaeological materials (Hokkaidō)
- List of Cultural Properties of Japan - historical materials (Hokkaidō)
- Matsumae Town Historical Museum
- Hakodate City Museum
- Hakodate City Museum
- List of Historic Sites of Japan (Hokkaidō)
- Hekirichi Bastion Fort
