= Kendra Preston Leonard =

American musicologist (born 1974)

Kendra Preston Leonard (June 11, 1974, New Orleans-August 19, 2026, Humble, Texas) was an American musicologist, poet and librettist. Her scholarship focused on women in music and music in screen history in 20th-century France, Britain, and America. Her creative work spanned three volumes of poetry, numerous song texts, and libretti for opera projects that focus on women’s stories and history.

== Education ==
She studied as a cellist at the University of North Carolina School of the Arts, The Peabody Conservatory, the Guildhall School of Music and Drama, and the University of Miami before studying musicology at the University of Cincinnati. She received her PhD from the University of Sunderland in 2014.

== Career ==
Leonard taught musicology at Westminster Choir College (2009-2011) and was a visiting lecturer at the University of Houston (2019-2020). She held the Thornton Wilder Fellowship at Yale University’s Beinecke Rare Book and Manuscript Library (2009-2010) and was awarded the inaugural Judith Tick Fellowship from the Society for American Music (2013-2014) for research on Louise Talma. She was founder and executive director of the Silent Film Sound and Music Archive beginning in 2014.

Leonard’s creative writing includes several volumes of poetry and libretti for numerous opera projects, including Marie Curie Learns to Swim with music by Jessica Rudman and several micro-operas by Lisa Neher. She also served as a teaching artist in libretto writing at Guerrilla Opera.

== Selected publications ==
- The Conservatoire Américain: A History, Scarecrow Press, 2007
- Shakespeare, Madness and Music: Scoring Insanity in Cinematic Adaptations, Scarecrow Press, 2009
- Louise Talma: A Life in Composition, Ashgate Publishing, 2014
- Making Mythology, Louisiana Literature Press, 2020
- Protectress, a novella in verse, Unsolicited Press, 2022
- Grab, Red Ogre Review, 2023
- A Registry of Omens, Red Ogre Review, 2024

== Selected contributions to vocal works ==
- Marie Curie Learns to Swim, libretto for the opera by Jessica Rudman (2018)
- The Harbingers, libretto for the opera by Rossa Crean (2020)
- Winter Goddess, Give Me Your Hands, for SATB choir and piano by Clifford W. King (2026)
- Protectress, libretto for opera by Jessica Rudman (in progress)
- This Is Jane, libretto for the opera by Angela Slater (in progress)
- Sweet Anna, libretto for the opera by Kathryn Woodard (in progress)

== Selected articles ==
- Preston., Leonard, Kendra (2011). Buffy, ballads, and bad guys who sing : music in the worlds of Joss Whedon. Scarecrow Press. ISBN 978-0-8108-6945-5. OCLC 939935646.
- Preston., Leonard, Kendra (2016). Music for Silent Film : a Guide to North American Resources. A-R Editions, Inc. ISBN 978-0-89579-835-0. OCLC 960760340.

== See also ==
- Women in musicology
