= Giichi Nomura =

- Born: October 20, 1914; Shiraoi, Hokkaido
- Died: December 28, 2008 (aged 94); Noboribetsu, Hokkaido
- Citizenship: Japan
- Occupation: Fisheries executive
- Known for: Hokkaido Utari Association

Giichi Nomura (野村義一, October 20, 1914 – December 28, 2008) was an advocate and activist for the Ainu people of Japan.

== Biography ==
Born in Shiraoi, Hokkaido, Nomura, of Ainu descent, became a career fisheries executive. In 1960 he joined the Hokkaido Utari Association, an Ainu advocacy group. Nomura represented the organization in several positions, including executive director from 1964 to 1996.

In 1992, Nomura spoke at the United Nations concerning Ainu issues, including Japan's policy of forced assimilation. Nomura spoke of the Japanese government's attitude towards the Ainu people: "In the eyes of the government, we are a people whose existence must not be admitted."

Nomura died in Noboribetsu, Hokkaido, on December 28, 2008.
