= Yasuko Matsuda (pianist) =

Japanese classical pianist and educator

Yasuko Matsuda is a Japanese classical pianist and educator.

== Early life ==
She was born in Kyoto.

== Career ==
She studied in Munich with Rosl Schmid.

She performed with Sergiu Celibidache and major European orchestras such as the Vienna Philharmonic and the Leipzig Gewandhaus Orchestra. In the Liszt Year (and one year after the Schumann Year) she performed a program featuring Robert Schumann's Fantasia in C major op. 17, Liszt's "Vallée d'Obermann" and the two elegies in A flat major.

She has taught at the Augsburg Conservatory and the University of Music and Performing Arts in Munich. Her students include Uliya Abdullayeva and Kathryn Woodard. She served on juries of competitions, including "Premio Trio di Trieste."

== Recordings ==
- "Jewish Song for Cello and Piano", from the Album Kleine Werke der Romantik (1998) Klaus Storck, Yasuko Matsuda.
