= Ainu Association of Hokkaido =

Ainu umbrella organization

The Ainu Association of Hokkaido (北海道アイヌ協会, Hokkaidō Ainu Kyōkai) is an umbrella group of which most Hokkaidō Ainu and some other Ainu are members. Originally controlled by the government with the intention of speeding Ainu assimilation and integration into the Japanese nation state, it now operates independently of the government and is run exclusively by Ainu. The group has been influential in raising public awareness of Ainu issues.

== History ==
In August of 1945, Japan experienced a significant military loss which led to Japan losing a good portion of their colonies but still kept Hokkaido as one of its territories. The Ainu believed that this new circumstance could potentially free them from suppression. This led to the establishment of the Hokkaido Ainu Association which continues to be the most prominent Ainu organisation.

The central goals of the association, in general, was to improve welfare, agricultural and fishing methods as well as education. This consisted of goals intending to restore control of certain pieces of land such as in Ashahikawa which had been promised to the Ainu or land that had been given to them under the post-war Agricultural Land Act.

After the military defeat experienced by Japan, their positioning on racial and ethnic diversity changed to advocate for a culturally homogenous state. This meant that any ethnic or cultural differences were viewed negatively leading to Japan to exert pressure on the Ainu to adopt and assimilate into mainstream Japanese customs. It was originally established in 1930 under the name Hokkaido Ainu Association (北海道アイヌ協会, Hokkaidō Ainu Kyōkai). Since 1961 utari (meaning 'friend') has been used instead of "Ainu". This was because many members believed "Ainu" was term that was received negatively. The organization's name was changed back to Hokkaido Ainu Association in early 2009. From 1964 to 1996, its executive director was Giichi Nomura.

== Development ==
After years of the suppression of Ainu culture, there is currently a large advocation for Ainu cultural revitalisation. Ainu cultural revitalisation is commonly linked to keeping what remains of the culture as well as recovering what has been lost. Currently, the Hokkaido Ainu Association supports holding traditional cultural activities which involves Ainu Hokkaido-based groups - that promote the preservation of their culture - to come together in each community and participate in these activities.

== See also ==
- Ainu flag
