= Pirikanoka =

Pirikanoka (ピリカノカ, lit. 'beautiful form') is the Ainu name, sung in yukar, for a grouping of geological features in Hokkaidō, Japan. In 2009, Pirikanoka was nationally designated a Place of Scenic Beauty, with the first six sites listed below, with an extension in 2012 to include the next three, and another in 2014 for the tenth. Each has its own name in Ainu.

== List of features ==
Name	Municipality	Comments	Image	Coordinates
Mount Kudo 九度山; Kudo-san or Kutōn-nupuri	Nayoro			44°25′08″N 142°31′46″E
Mount Kogane 黄金山; Kogane-yama or Pinnetai-orushipe	Ishikari			43°37′26″N 141°28′23″E
Cape Kamui 神威岬; Kamui-misaki or Kamui-etō	Esashi, Hamatonbetsu	different from Cape Kamui		45°03′35″N 142°30′14″E
Cape Erimo 襟裳岬; Erimo-misaki or Onne-enrumu	Erimo			41°55′28″N 143°14′57″E
Ganbō Rock 瞰望岩; Ganbō-iwa or Enka-rushi	Engaru			44°03′16″N 143°31′02″E
Kamuichashi カムイチャシ; Kamuichashi	Toyoura			42°34′43″N 140°36′56″E
Etomo Peninsula Coastline 絵鞆半島外海岸; Etomo-hantō soto kaigan	Muroran			42°19′22″N 140°57′46″E
Mount Tokachiporoshiri 十勝幌尻岳; Tokachiporoshiri-dake or Tokachi-poroshiri	Obihiro, Nakasatsunai			42°41′44″N 142°51′34″E
Mount Poroshiri 幌尻岳; Poroshiri-dake or Poroshiri	Biratori, Niikappu			42°43′10″N 142°40′58″E
Okikurumi Chashi and Muinoka オキクルミのチャシ及びムイノカ; Okikurumi no chashi oyobi Muinoka	Biratori			42°40′12″N 142°12′21″E

== See also ==
- Monuments of Japan
- List of Places of Scenic Beauty of Japan (Hokkaido)
