= Shimoguni Morosue =

Shimoguni Morosue (下国 師季) was a samurai, Gōzoku during Muromachi Period in Ezo. Morosue was also known as "Andō Hachiro Morosue" (安東八郎師季), as well as "Sigebetsu Shimoguni Shikibu Morosue" (茂別下国式部師季). He was the grandson of Andō Iemasa, although his father is unknown. (Note: In some family trees, his name was also written: 家季宅季.) His seishitsu was Kakizaki Suehiro's daughter.

According to "Shinra no kiroku", Morosue's grandfather, Lemasa, was the Lord of Shigebetsu castle and one of the Ezo shugos. However, one theory is Andō Sadasue, not Morosue, was the only shugo ruler of Ezo.

In Eiroku 5 (1562), (Note: Kaiho Mineo claims that correct year was Eisei 5 (1508). (『中世の蝦夷地』吉川弘文館、1987年、ISBN 9784642026505)) due to Ainu attacks, Morosue lost Shigebetsu castle and escaped to Matsumae and was ordained as "Jōkan". As family trees show, Morosue and his son (Shimoguni Shigesue) were on bad terms, so he moved to Setanai.

After Morosue's death, his son Shigesue took over the family estate. After Shigesue's death, Yoshisue (Shigesue's younger brother's son) took over the family estate and became Karō of Matsumae domain (Shimoguni clan).
