= Kōsetsu-en =

Coordinates: 41°47′35″N 140°48′12″E

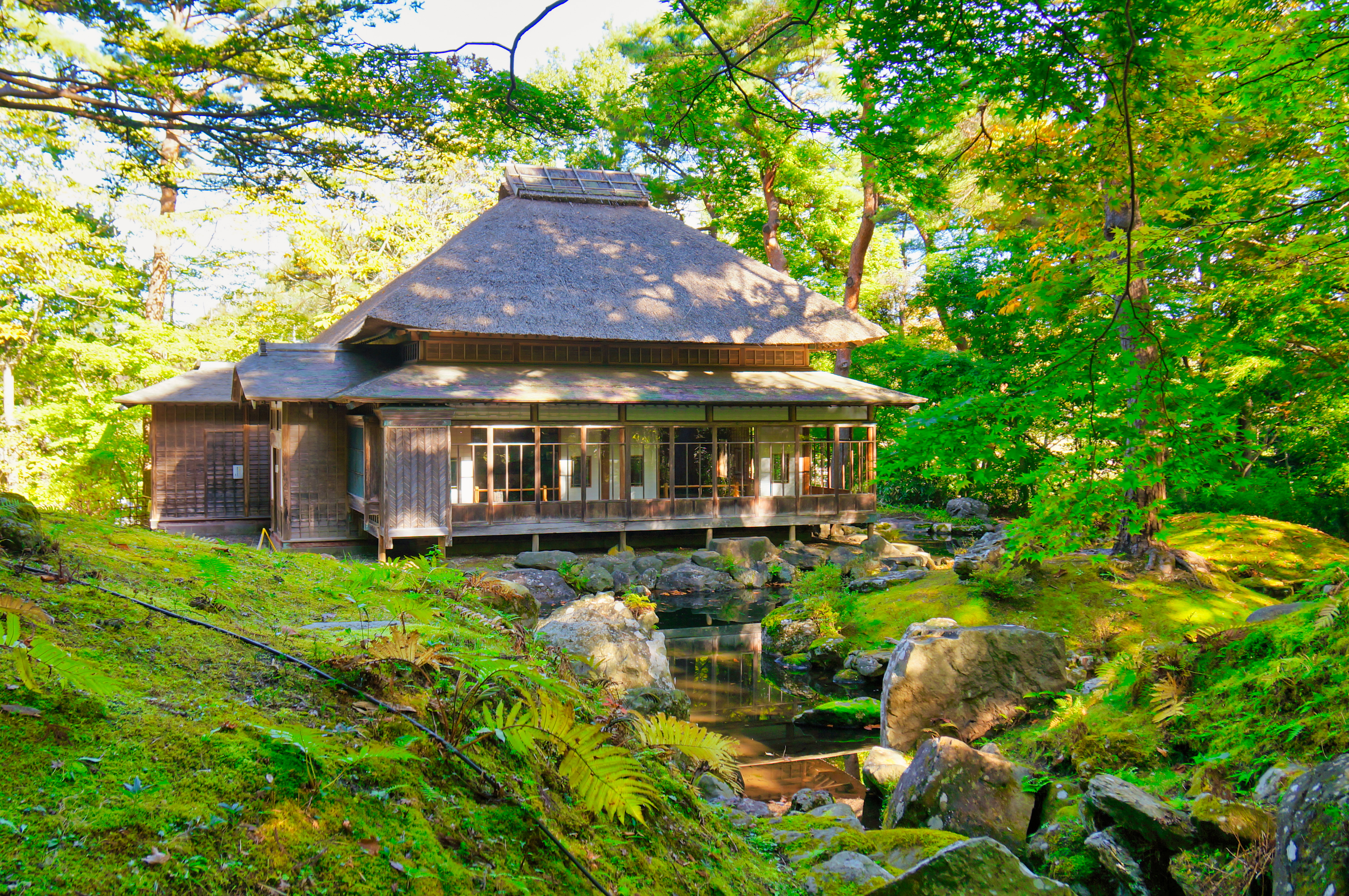
Miharashi Park

Kōsetsu-en (香雪園) is a garden that fuses Japanese and Western styles in Hakodate, Hokkaidō, Japan. It was constructed in 1898 (or alternatively 1895) by a prominent merchant by the name of Iwafune. The gardens are a nationally designated Place of Scenic Beauty.

== See also ==
- Japanese gardens
