= Nené (footballer, born 1979) =

Portuguese-born Cape Verdean footballer

Personal information
- Full name: Adriano Barbosa Miranda da Luz
- Date of birth: 24 August 1979 (age 47)
- Place of birth: Lisbon, Portugal
- Height: 1.86 m (6 ft 1 in)
- Position: Midfielder

Youth career
- 1989–1991: Águias da Póvoa
- 1991–1994: Ponte Frielas
- 1994–1997: Odivelas
- 1997–1998: Boavista

Senior career*
Years	Team	Apps	(Gls)
1998–1999	Marco	25	(2)
1999–2000	Vilafranquense	35	(2)
2000–2002	Gondomar	45	(5)
2002	Braga B	11	(2)
2002–2005	Braga	38	(0)
2004	→ Çaykur Rizespor (loan)	5	(0)
2004–2005	→ Aves (loan)	31	(3)
2005–2006	União Leiria	5	(0)
2006	→ Aves (loan)	13	(3)
2006–2007	Aves	18	(1)
2007	Al Arabi		
2008	Enosis Neon	12	(0)
2009	Pontevedra	18	(0)
2009–2010	Braşov	9	(0)
2010–2012	Arouca	49	(0)
2012–2013	Covilhã	47	(1)
2014	Famalicão	14	(2)
2014–2019	Vilaverdense	159	(20)
Total		534	(41)

International career
2004–2008	Cape Verde	14	(0)
- * Club domestic league appearances and goals

Adriano Barbosa Miranda da Luz (born 24 August 1979), commonly known as Nené, is a Cape Verdean former professional footballer who played as a central midfielder.

== Club career ==
Born in the capital Lisbon, Nené spent most of his professional career in Portugal. After starting out in the lower leagues, he signed in early 2002 with Primeira Liga club S.C. Braga from Gondomar SC, 31 of his 38 league games with the Minho team coming in the 2002–03 season, in a 14th-place finish.

After definitively leaving Braga (which also loaned him twice during his spell), Nené signed with U.D. Leiria which in turn loaned him to C.D. Aves, with the latter side promoting to the top division at the end of 2005–06. The move was subsequently made permanent, and the player was relatively used the following campaign – 1,131 minutes, one goal in a 2–1 away loss against Boavista FC, whom he had represented as a youth – which ended in immediate relegation.

Nené rarely settled in the following years, playing in Kuwait, Cyprus, Spain and Romania. In 2010–11, aged 31, he returned to his birth nation and joined F.C. Arouca, promoted for the first time ever to the Segunda Liga. On 12 July 2012, he switched to S.C. Covilhã of the same league.

In the summer of 2014, following a brief spell with F.C. Famalicão, Nené moved to the lower leagues with Vilaverdense FC, going on to retire well past his 30s.

== International career ==
Nené was part of the Cape Verde squad which progressed to the second stage of the 2006 FIFA World Cup qualifiers, appearing in six out of 12 possible matches. The national team finished second bottom in their group, failing to qualify for both the competition in Germany and the 2006 Africa Cup of Nations.
