= Ernest Pérochon =

French writer

Ernest Pérochon (1885–1942) was a French writer who won the Prix Goncourt in 1920 for his novel Nêne. Initially a teacher, he left his career in education in 1921 to pursue writing. He wrote poems, novels (ranging from realism to science fiction), as well as children's literature.

== Childhood and adolescence ==
Pérochon was born on 24 February 1885 in Courlay, Deux-Sèvres at Tyran Farm. He was raised as a Protestant in a region with an unusual religious make-up, living alongside both Royalist Catholic "chouans" from the Vendée and dissidents from "the little church" which had refused the authority of the 1801 Concordat signed by Napoleon and Pope Pius VII.

Pérochon was very attached to his home region and to family values. He described in his stories his love for the common people, "les cherche-pain" (bread seekers) in his home region of the Gâtine at the beginning of the 20th century. In 1897, Pérochon became a student at l’Ecole Primaire Supérieure in Bressuire, eleven kilometers north of Courlay.

== Adulthood ==
In 1900, Pérochon enrolled at l’Ecole Normale in Parthenay (35 kilometers southeast of Courlay), and he later became an assistant primary teacher at Courlay before becoming a teacher at l’Ecole Primaire Supérieure in Parthenay. He served in the military in 1905 under the 114th Infantry Regiment in Saint-Maixent.

In 1907, Pérochon married Vanda Houmeau, who was also a teacher. He then moved to Saint-Paul-en-Gâtine where his only daughter, Simone, was born in 1908. In 1908, his first work was published by Clouzot in Niort. In 1909, he was published for a second time and his first novel, Les creux de maisons, in which he evoked the image of "les cherche-pain," was also serialized in the newspaper l’Humanité in this year.

In 2012, Pérochon's 1925 science fiction novel Les Hommes Frénétiques was translated by Brian Stableford as The Frenetic People. ISBN 978-1-61227-118-7

== Death ==
In 1914, Pérochon returned to teaching in Vouillé. After being called up to the army, he suffered a heart attack on the front lines. In 1920, his novel Nêne, published by Clouzot, earned him the Prix Goncourt. The following year, he retired from teaching for good and moved to Niort.

In 1940, Pérochon refused to collaborate with the Vichy press and two of his novels were banned. He was threatened by the Vichy Prefect, and the Gestapo watched him closely. He concealed his anxiety from his family. He died on 10 February 1942 from another heart attack at age 57.

== Anecdote ==
In 1935, Pérochon's daughter, Simone, married Delphin Debenest, who was also involved in the Resistance during World War II. A soldier in 1940, this intelligence agent in the Franco-Belgian Resistance was arrested by the Gestapo and sent to Buchenwald and then to Kommando in Holzen from which he succeeded in escaping. During the Nuremberg Trials, this extraordinary man acted as deputy prosecutor. He was also a magistrate in Niort and Poitiers and won numerous French and Belgian military decorations.

== Novels (selected) ==
- Les Creux-De-Maisons (1912)
- Les hommes frénétiques (1925) (translated in 2012 by Brian Stableford as "The Frenetic People")
- Nêne (1920) - Prix Goncourt (translated in 1922)
- Le Chemin de plaine (1920)
- La Parcelle 32 (1922) (translated in 1923 by Frances C. Fay)
- Les Ombres (1923)
- Les Gardiennes (1924) (made into a film of the same name in 2017)

== Homage and tributes ==
On 31 March 1985 the public school of Tour Nivelle (in Courlay) held a commemoration ceremony for the 100th birthday of Pérochon which was well-attended by the public, and many key figures were there. Under the High Patronage of the Minister of National Education and Culture, numerous speeches were given, including one by Mr. Leblond-Zola, grandson of Émile Zola. For this occasion, a classroom from the time when Pérochon was a student (and later a teacher) at Tour Nivelle was reconstructed. People have visited this place from then on, and it can still be visited today.

This marked the beginning of the year of Pérochon which was celebrated with many cultural events in the Deux-Sèvres as well as with shows and displays relating to the works of Pérochon such as "l’homme frénétique" (The Frenzied Man), "les creux de maisons," and "les gardiennes" (The Caretakers).

The high school in Parthenay, a group of schools in Niort and in Cerizay, the municipal library in Echiré and many streets in the department of the Deux-Sèvres are named in memory of this French writer.
