= Horace Clarence Boyer =

American singer

- Born: July 28, 1935; Winter Park, Florida
- Died: July 21, 2009 (aged 73); Amherst, Massachusetts

Dr. Horace Clarence Boyer (July 28, 1935 – July 21, 2009) was one of the foremost scholars in African-American gospel music.

== Life and career ==
Boyer received a B.A. from Bethune-Cookman College, and an M.A. and Ph.D. from the Eastman School of Music. He and his brother James had a career as singers under the name the Famous Boyer Brothers. The brothers recorded for Excello (1952), Chance (1954), Vee-Jay (1955 and 1957), Nashboro and Savoy (1966 and 1967). He appeared with such artists as Mahalia Jackson, James Cleveland, Alex Bradford, Clara Ward, and Dorothy Love Coates.

As an educator, he taught at several universities, including the Brevard Junior College (circa 1969 - 1970.As one of his students, he taught voice, piano and music theory. The institution is now known as Brevard Community College in Cocoa, Florida.) University of Massachusetts Amherst (1973-1999), Albany State College (GA), the University of Central Florida at Orlando and Brooklyn College Conservatory of Music where he served as Senior Research Fellow and visiting professor in 1992. He directed many choirs and gospel workshops throughout the world, including annual events such as the Gospel Music Festival in Boulder, CO which he led from 1988 to 2008. The author of the 1995 book, How Sweet the Sound: The Golden Age of Gospel Music, which received high praise from Booklist and Library Journal, Dr. Boyer was instrumental in introducing African-American gospel music to many communities beyond the African-American church.

He served as guest curator of musical history at the Smithsonian Institution from 1985 to 1986, and was Distinguished Scholar-at-Large at Fisk University in 1986 and 1987, where he conducted the famed Fisk Jubilee Singers. He was an advisor on gospel music to the New Grove Dictionary of American Music and was editor of the 1993 edition of the African American hymnal, Lift Every Voice and Sing, II. Horace Boyer published over 40 articles on gospel music in publications that included the Music Educators Journal, the Black Music Research Journal and Black Perspectives in Music.

He was the 2009 recipient of the Lifetime Achievement Award of The Society for American Music, an award whose past recipients include Robert Stevenson, Eileen Southern, Billy Taylor, H. Wiley Hitchcock, Bill C. Malone, Adrienne Fried Block, Vivian Perlis, Charles Hamm and other important musicologists, historians and educators.

== Additional references ==
- Boyer, Horace Clarence. How Sweet the Sound. ISBN 1-880216-19-1.
- Reagon, Bernice Johnson. We'll Understand It Better By and By: Pioneering African American Gospel Composers. ISBN 1-56098-167-9.
