= Women in musicology =

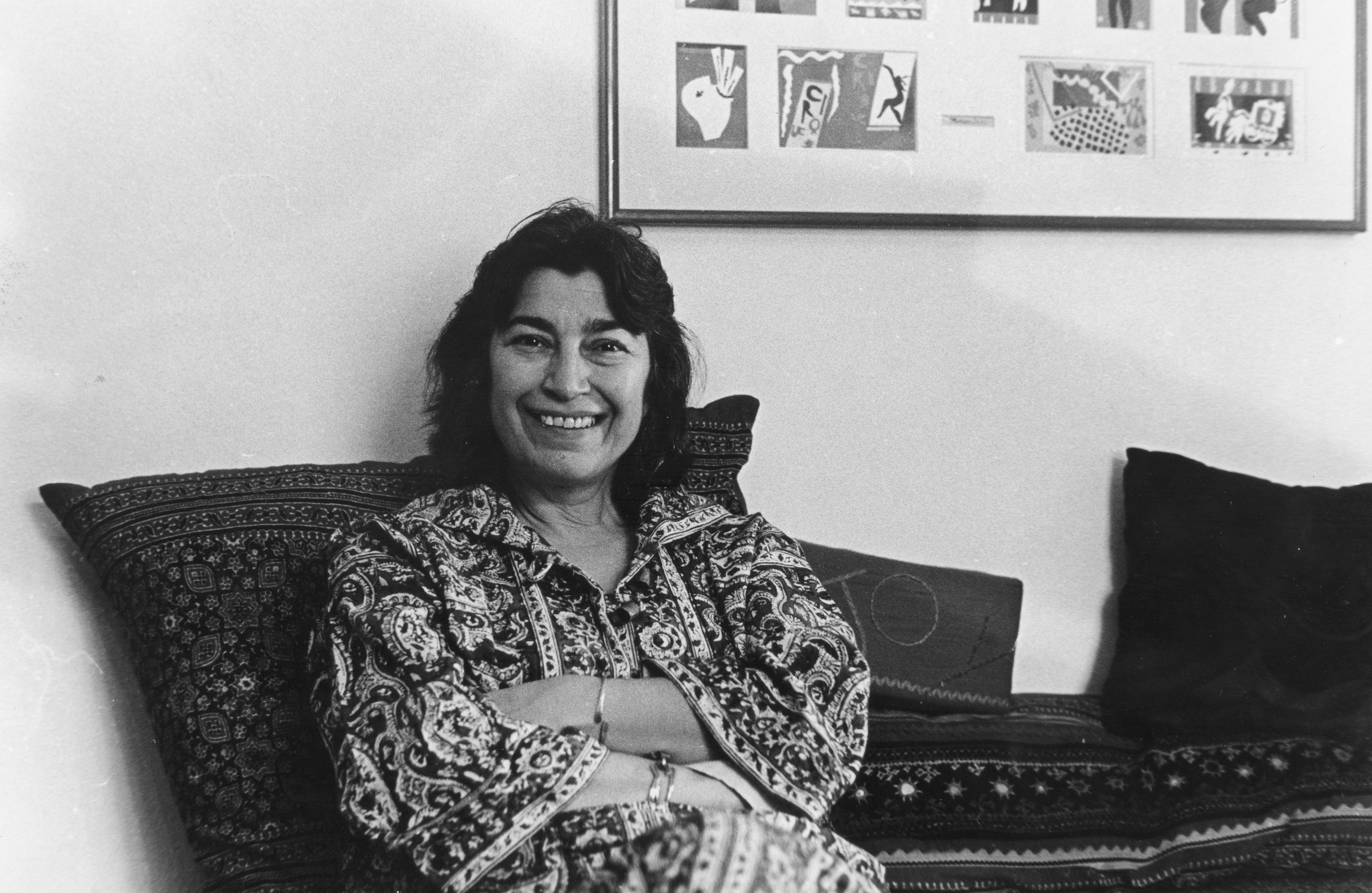
Rosetta Reitz (1924–2008) was an American jazz historian and feminist who established a record label producing 18 albums of the music of the early women of jazz and the blues.

Women in musicology describes the role of women professors, scholars and researchers in postsecondary education musicology departments at postsecondary education institutions, including universities, colleges and music conservatories. Traditionally, the vast majority of major musicologists and music historians have been men. Nevertheless, some women musicologists have reached the top ranks of the profession. Carolyn Abbate (born 1956) is an American musicologist who did her PhD at Princeton University. She has been described by the Harvard Gazette as "one of the world's most accomplished and admired music historians".

Susan McClary (born 1946) is a musicologist associated with the "New Musicology" who incorporates feminist music criticism in her work. McClary holds a PhD from Harvard University. One of her best known works is Feminine Endings (1991), which covers musical constructions of gender and sexuality, gendered aspects of traditional music theory, gendered sexuality in musical narrative, music as a gendered discourse and issues affecting women musicians. In the book, McClary suggests that the sonata form (used in symphonies and string quartets) may be a sexist or misogynistic procedure that constructs of gender and sexual identity. McClary's Conventional Wisdom (2000) argues that the traditional musicological assumption of the existence of "purely musical" elements, divorced from culture and meaning, the social and the body, is a conceit used to veil the social and political imperatives of the worldview that produces the classical canon most prized by supposedly objective musicologists.

American musicologist Marcia Citron has asked "[w]hy is music composed by women so marginal to the standard 'classical' repertoire?" Citron "examines the practices and attitudes that have led to the exclusion of women composers from the received 'canon' of performed musical works." She argues that in the 1800s, women composers typically wrote art songs for performance in small recitals rather than symphonies intended for performance with an orchestra in a large hall, with the latter works being seen as the most important genre for composers; since women composers did not write many symphonies, they were deemed to be not notable as composers.

Other notable women scholars include:

- Carolyn Abbate
- Naomi André
- Eva Badura-Skoda
- Ita Beausang
- Margaret Bent
- Suzanne Cusick
- Tina Frühauf
- Ursula Günther
- Maud Cuney Hare
- Wendy B. Heller
- Barbara L. Kelly
- Liudmila Kovnatskaya
- Elizabeth Eva Leach
- Kendra Preston Leonard
- Carol Oja
- Nancy Reich
- Rosetta Reitz
- Joan Rimmer
- Ellen Rosand
- Elaine Sisman
- Eileen Southern
- Hedi Stadlen
- Rose Rosengard Subotnik
- Judith Tick
- Anahit Tsitsikian
- Josephine Wright

== Ethnomusicologists ==
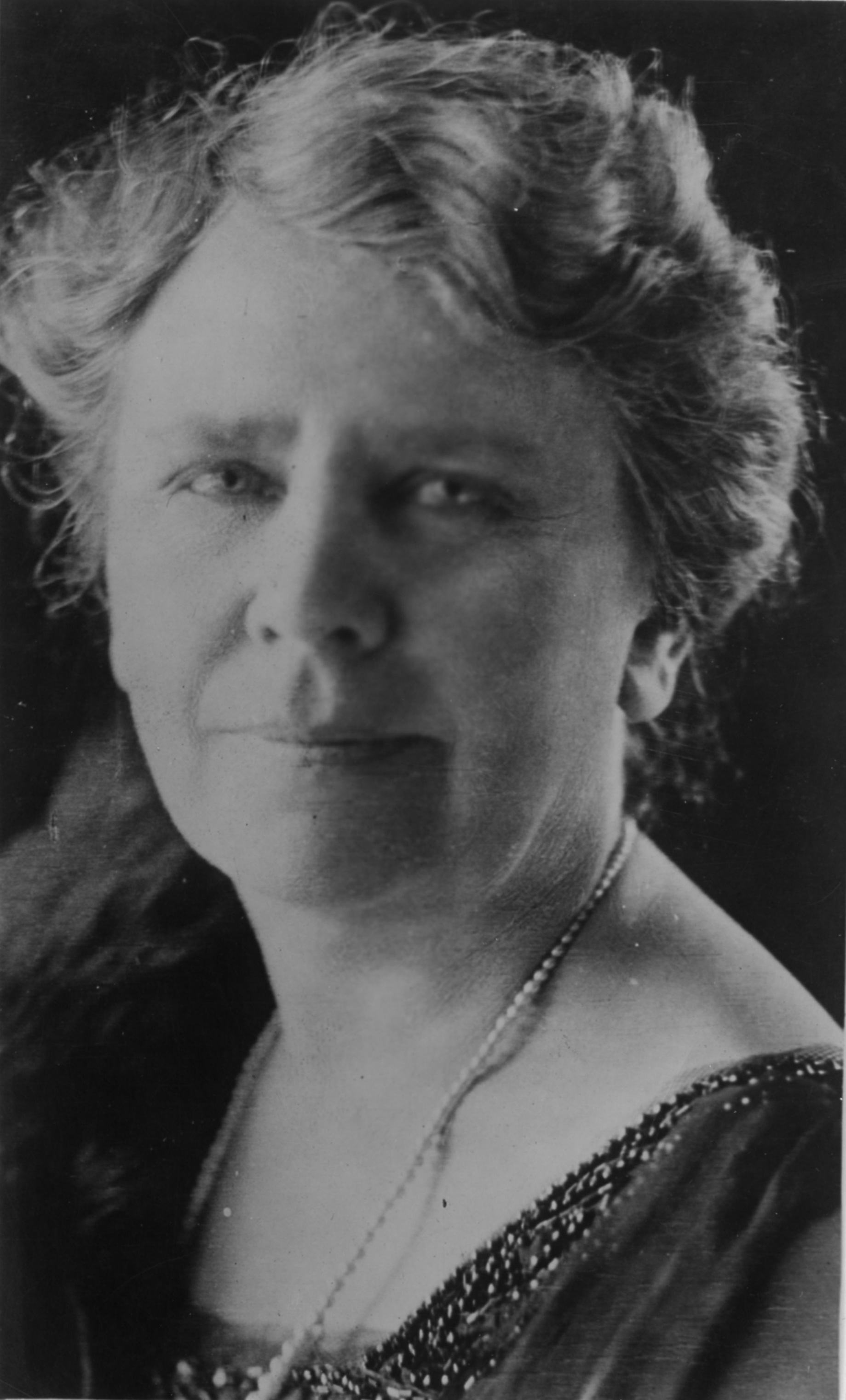
Frances Densmore (1867 – 1957) was an American anthropologist and ethnographer known for her studies of Native American music and culture.

Ethnomusicologists study the many musics around the world that emphasize their cultural, social, material, cognitive, biological, and other dimensions or contexts instead of or in addition to its isolated sound component or any particular repertoire. Ethnomusicology – a term coined by Jaap Kunst from the Greek words ἔθνος (ethnos, "nation") and μουσική (mousike, "music") – is often described as the anthropology or ethnography of music. Initially, ethnomusicology was almost exclusively oriented toward non-Western music, but now includes the study of Western music from anthropological, sociological and intercultural perspectives.

Notable ethnomusicologists include:

- Judith Becker
- Frances Densmore
- Joanna Everharda La Rivière Fourie
- Ida Halpern
- Maud Karpeles
- Joan Rimmer
- Janet E Tobitt
- Ellen Koskoff
