= Krümmel (surname) =

Krümmel or Krummel is a surname. Notable people with the surname include:

- Brendan Krummel (born 1972), Australian rules footballer
- Donald William Krummel (born 1929), American music bibliographer, professor and librarian
- Jerry Krummel, American politician
- Matthew Krummel (born 1968), American pathologist
- Miriamne Krummel, American historian of judaism
- Otto Krümmel (1854–1912), German geographer
