= Robert Evett (composer) =

Robert Evett (November 30, 1922 - February 3, 1975) was an American composer and journalist. Along with Robert Parris and Russell Woollen, he was one of a trifecta described by Irving Lowens as the "Washington School" of composers.

== Life and career ==
Born in Loveland, Colorado, Evett was the son of a livery stable owner. His mother was a pianist, and introduced him to music; he began composing early. At one point discovering, in his early teenage years, that Artur Schnabel was vacationing in Colorado, Evett showed the pianist a piano sonata he had written, receiving encouragement for his efforts. Shortly thereafter his elder brother Kenneth brought him to Colorado Springs to begin formal study under Roy Harris. He studied under Harris between 1941 and 1947, going to Cornell University as a Telluride Fellow and attending Colorado College for further lessons. In 1947 he went to Washington, D.C., where he chaired the department of music at the Institute of Contemporary Arts and held a position at the District of Columbia Public Library. He moved to New York in 1951 for studies in composition under Vincent Persichetti at the Juilliard School, where he also studied choral conducting with Margaret Hillis; he returned to Washington the following year when offered a job by The New Republic. He remained in Washington until his death. Evett received two Pulitzer Prize nominations during his career, one for his music and one for his literary commentary. Evett died in Takoma Park, Maryland. A large collection of papers and biographical material is currently held by the Library of Congress; a handful of manuscripts and copies are held by the New York Public Library. Some of his choral work has been recorded.

== Music and writing ==
Evett's compositional career saw him receive commissions from the Pan-American Union, the National Symphony Orchestra, Georgetown University, and the Composer's Forum for Catholic Worship. Concurrently he pursued a career as a writer; he was book editor and music critic for The New Republic from 1952 until 1968, and from 1968 until 1969 edited the "Arts and Letters" section of the Atlantic Monthly. Additionally, from 1961 to 1975 he contributed criticism on books and music to the Washington Star; from 1970 until 1975 he was also its book editor.

Evett's style has been described as neoclassical and spiced with dissonance. His music relies heavily on classical forms, and his works often feature parts for harpsichord. Until 1950 he often used fragments of plainchant in his compositions. He would sometimes combine these tendencies with a more dissonant harmonic flavor. In later works the rigidity of these elements is relaxed somewhat, and his mature style is less severe harmonically and rhythmically. Some of his later works draw inspiration from such writers as Herman Melville and Mark Twain. At the time of his death he was working on a bicentennial commission from the National Symphony Orchestra.

== List of works ==
Adapted from:

=== Orchestral ===
- Concertino (1952)
- Concerto for Small Orchestra (1952)
- Cello Concerto No. 1 (1954)
- Variations for Clarinet and Orchestra (1955)
- Piano Concerto (1957)
- Symphony No. 1 (1960)
- Symphony No. 2, Billy Ascends, for voices and orchestra (Washington, D.C., May 7, 1965)
- Symphony No. 3 (Washington, D.C, June 6, 1965)
- Harpsichord Concerto (Washington, D.C., April 25, 1961)
- Anniversary Concerto 75 (Washington, D.C., Oct. 19, 1963)
- Cello Concerto No. 2 (1971)
- The Windhover for bassoon and orchestra (Washington, D.C, May 20, 1971)
- Monadnock, dance music (1975)

=== Chamber ===
- Clarinet Sonata (1948)
- Trio Sonata for organ (1953)
- Piano Quintet (1954)
- Duo for Violin and Piano (1955)
- Cello Sonata (1955)
- Viola Sonata (1958)
- 2 violin sonatas (1960; 1975, unfinished)
- Piano Quartet (1961)
- Sonata for harpsichord (1961)
- Oboe Sonata (1964)
- Fantasia on a Theme by Handel for piano, violin, and cello (1966)

==== Piano ====
- 5 Capriccios (1943–9)
- 4 sonatas (1945, 1952, 1953, 1956)
- Chaconne (1950)
- Toccata for 2 Pianos (1959)
- Ricercare for 2 Pianos (1961)
- 6 Etudes (1961)

=== Vocal ===
- The Mask of Cain for 2 baritones, soprano, and harpsichord (1949)
- Mass for voices and organ (1950)
- Billy in the Darbies for baritone, clarinet, string quartet, and piano (1958)
- The 5 Books of Life for 2 baritones, soprano, and harpsichord (1960)
- Requiem for chorus (1973)
- other choruses; songs
