= Russell Woollen =

American classical composer

Charles Russell Woollen (January 7, 1923, Hartford, Connecticut – March 16, 1994) was an American keyboard artist and composer.

With composers Robert Evett (1922–1975), and Robert Parris (1924–1999), he was a key figure in what might be considered a "Washington School" of composers, as termed by Irving Lowens, that flourished in the 1960s and 1970s. His many compositions, both vocal and instrumental, have been performed throughout the United States and Europe.

== Music career ==
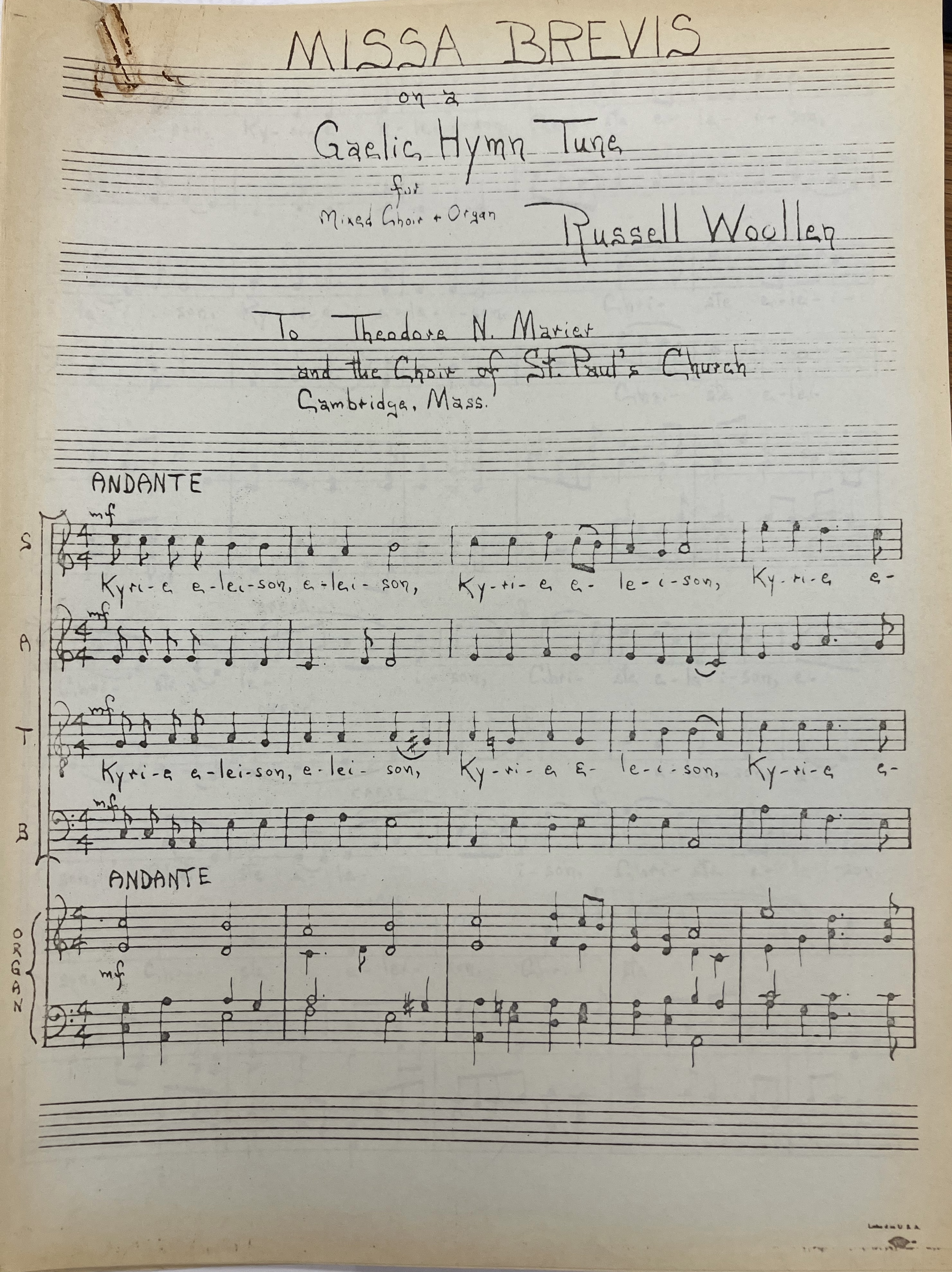
First page of the manuscript of Missa Quis sicut te (RW 75, 1962)

Woollen began his musical training with piano lessons at the age of six. Many of his relatives were active in the church choir, and within a few years he was accompanying them in family sing-alongs. This early connection with the Catholic Church and choral music made his high school choice of the Pius X, a minor seminary in New York City, a natural one. "There he signaled his intention to study for the priesthood with a focus on liturgical music." During this period, he spent a summer working with Father Franz Wasner at a music camp in New Hampshire and studied organ with Ernest White at the Anglican Church of St. Mary the Virgin in New York.

Later, Woollen moved to Washington to complete his studies for the priesthood at Catholic University. He soon assumed the position of organist-choirmaster at the National Shrine of the Immaculate Conception, adjacent to the Catholic University campus. In 1944 he earned a Bachelor of Arts degree from St. Mary's Seminary and University in Baltimore, followed by a Master of Arts degree in Romance languages from Catholic University in 1948.

Woollen was ordained a priest in 1947. Shortly thereafter he was invited to join the faculty at Catholic University where he was a central figure in the founding of the university's Benjamin T. Rome School of Music. He continued to study music with Nicholas Nabokov at the Peabody Conservatory in Baltimore, and he traveled to Paris to study with Nadia Boulanger.

Between 1953 and 1955 Woollen secured a sabbatical leave to study composition with Walter Piston at Harvard, which gave him a "rock-bottom confidence [in] writing for the orchestra." It was during this period that Woollen's composing gathered momentum. Among the works from this early period are a number of masses and other choral works, and the Toccata for Orchestra (1955), which was "performed by the National Symphony Orchestra to wide acclaim." His first symphony was composed between 1957 and 1961.

Another significant early work is Woollen's opera, The Decorator (1958), which was commissioned by the National Broadcasting Corporation for the network's "Catholic Hour." His sister, Dorothy Woollen Getlein, and brother-in-law, Frank Getlein, were the librettists. This humorous work depicts the turmoil caused by the invasion of a new suburban home by the hired interior decorator, who overwhelms the unsuspecting couple with "the things that can be done to make their house competitive with its neighbors. . ." The opera revived in January 1993 for a series of performances celebrating the composer's seventieth birthday. A second opera, based on texts by Oscar Wilde, was in preparation in 1993, but remained unfinished at the time of the composer's death in 1994.

The combined pressures of the priesthood, teaching, and the decidedly secular lifestyle of the composer began to weigh heavily on Woollen in the late 1950s and early 1960s: "I was burning the candle at both ends, as they say, and I began to get tremendous headaches. They would hover and descend on me like a black cloud."

Woollen left the faculty of Catholic University in 1962 and soon thereafter, in 1964, he abandoned the priesthood as well. Between 1964 and 1969 he made the difficult transition to secular life. He remained the keyboard artist for the National Symphony Orchestra, a position he had held since 1956, and in 1969 he accepted a position teaching at Howard University, where he remained until 1974.

Woollen wrote several works during this transitional period, including a setting of Donne's sonnets, La Corona (1967–71), and the moving In martyrum memoriam (1968–9), a forty-five-minute cantata for choir, soloists, and orchestra based on texts from the Bible, the Roman Catholic Mass for Martyrs, and the speeches of Martin Luther King, Jr. This work was premiered by the National Symphony on November 16, 1969, and has been performed numerous times since, including a 1979 performance by the Chicago Symphony Orchestra and Chorus under Margaret Hillis.

Woollen continued to compose prolifically during the 1970s, producing a second symphony (1977–8), Two pieces for Piano and Orchestra (1975–6), and numerous smaller works, both vocal and instrumental. In 1975 he was commissioned by the National Symphony to complete Robert Evett's sketch of Monadnock, a cantata for soprano, bass, mixed chorus, and orchestra based on texts by Mark Twain. This commission was especially fitting since Woollen and Evett had been close friends for many years. He and his wife, Margaret, were married in 1977.

He left the National Symphony in 1980. Since 1982 he had been the organist at the Unitarian Church of Arlington (Virginia), and also served as organist for the Adas Israel Congregation in Washington since the early 1980s. Woollen also served as the musical director for Alexandria, Virginia's Opera Americana, which "specializes in early and contemporary American opera. . ." He continued to write vocal and instrumental works and to teach privately.

Although many of his works remain unpublished, his numerous compositions continue to be performed, especially in the mid-Atlantic region. Woollen has influenced many other composers and musicians in the region, both through his university teaching and through personal contact.

Russell Woollen died on March 16, 1994, at the University of Virginia Medical Center while visiting Charlottesville.

While the career and compositions of Russell Woollen remain under-explored areas of scholarly inquiry, a notable exception to this is the 2011 DMA dissertation of Kevin O’Brien on Woollen’s sacred compositions, which includes a complete catalog of the composer’s works. (See external links.)

== Additional articles ==
(Listed by work to which they refer)

Mass for a Great Space

premieres: AM ORG 20:36 Jul 1986

Lines of Stephen Crane

AM ENS 4:5 n4 1981

In martyrum memoriam

AM CHORAL R 21:16–18 n3 1979
AM CHORAL R 12:116-17 n3 1970
BMI p. 8 Jan 1970
MUS ED J 56:122 Feb 1970

Sonata for Trombone and Piano

News Nuggets, INT MUS 70:29 Jun 1972

Music for Harp, Oboe and Percussion

AM HARP J 3:15 n2 1971
AM HARP J 2:11–15 n4 1970

Fantasy for Flute and Strings

BMI p. 25 Jun 1969

Three Sacred Choruses for Women's Voices and Orchestra

BMI p. 47 Summer 1969

[Various Works]

BMI p. 10 Mar 1967

Mass

I. Lowens AM CHORAL R 10:21-2 n1 19647

Nativitie

BMI p. 12 Jun 1967

Willow Brook Suite [#1]

BMI p. 9 Jun 1965

Suite

BMI p. 15 Oct 1966

AmerAllegro

PAN PIPES 55:76 n2 1963

Suite for Piano

Concert Hall ACA 10:29 n1 1961

The Decorator

MUS AMER 79:14 May 1959

Mass for Boy's Voices

NOTES 16:151-2 Dec 1958

Improperium

MUS Q 44:381 Jul 1958

"Actuaciones del compositor y musicologo Rev. Padre Russell Woollen."

REV MUS CHILENA II:86-7 Aug/Sep 1957

Missa melismatica: unison choir and organ

NOTES 13:347 8 Mar 1956

Mass in the Major Modes: congregation & double choir

NOTES 13:347 Mar 1956
CAECILIA 82:231 Sep–Oct 1955

Chronicle and Commencement

CATH CHOIRMASTER 40:188 Winter 1954

"New Contributing Editor"

CAECILIA 80:58 Jan/Feb 1953
