= Woollen (surname) =

Woollen is a surname. Notable people with the surname include:

- Evans Woollen (1864–1942), American lawyer, banker, presidential candidate and college football coach
- Evans Woollen III (1927–2016), American architect, grandson of the above
- Mark Woollen (fl. 1993–present), American director and editor of movie trailers
- Russell Woollen (1923–1994), American keyboard artist and composer
- Thomas W. Woollen (1830–1898), American lawyer, judge, politician and Indiana Attorney General

== See also ==
- Riq Woolen (born 1999), American National League Football player
