= Marva Griffin Carter =

American musicologist

- Alma mater: Boston Conservatory at Berklee; New England Conservatory of Music; Boston University; University of Illinois Urbana-Champaign
- Occupation: Musicologist, musician, organist, university teacher
- Employer: Georgia State University; Morris Brown College; Simmons University
- Spouse(s): Lawrence Carter
- Awards: lifetime achievement award (Society for American Music)

Marva Griffin Carter is an American musician, composer, musicologist, and author. She has worked as an academic administrator and professor at Georgia State University since 1993. In 2020 the Society for American Music recognized her work with a Lifetime Achievement Award, granted "in recognition of the recipient's significant and substantial lifetime achievement in scholarship, performance, teaching, and/or support of American Music."

== Early life and education ==
Carter graduated from the Boston Conservatory (now Boston Conservatory at Berklee) with a Bachelor of Music in Piano Performance, and received a Master of Music from the New England Conservatory of Music. She then earned a second master's degree in musicology from Boston University in 1975. In 1988 she received a doctorate (PhD) from the University of Illinois at Urbana.

The subject of her master's thesis at Boston University was the composer Hall Johnson. Her PhD dissertation was titled The life and music of Will Marion Cook. (Note: This work was also the basis for Griffin's later published book on the same subject (see Publications).)

She has spoken of a serendipitous meeting in 1970 with the musicologist Eileen Southern, who inspired her to pursue an academic career, saying of the encounter, "[she] basically recruited me," and "I would not have achieved what I have, or even pursued my areas of interest were it not for her."

== Work and career ==
Carter began her academic career as coordinator of the African American Studies Program at Simmons University, Boston. She then became the chair of the Music Department at Morris Brown College in Atlanta, Georgia. Since 1993 she has worked as an academic administrator and professor at Georgia State University, where she served as Assistant Director, later Director of Graduate Studies, and currently, Co-Chair of the Diversity, Equity, and Inclusion Committee in the School of Music. She was the 1998 Barbara Jordan/W. E. B. DuBois Award for Outstanding Teaching recipient.

She is a member of the American Musicological Society and the Society for American Music.

Her book Swing Along: The Musical life of Will Marion Cook was published in 2008.

Carter was the organist for Ebenezer Baptist Church in Atlanta. She is also writing a book about the sacred musical traditions and repertoire of the historic church.

In 2020, her work was recognized with the Society for American Music's Lifetime Achievement Award.

Carter was featured in Harvard Radcliffe Institute's 2022 webinar Black Music and the American University: Eileen Southern's Story.

== Personal life ==
Griffin Carter is married to the historian and civil rights scholar Lawrence Carter. They have one son, Lawrence Edward Carter Jr.

== Publications ==
- Griffin Carter, Marva. Hall Johnson – Preserver of the Old Negro Spiritual (1880–1970). www.worldcat.org. Retrieved 2023-03-24. (Master's thesis, Boston University, 1975)
- Griffin Carter, Marva. Roland Hayes–Expressor of the Soul in Song (1887–1977), The Black Perspective in Music, Autumn 1977, 188.
- Griffin Carter, Marva. The life and music of Will Marion Cook. Thesis, Dissertation, University of Illinois at Urbana-Champaign. 1988 – via WorldCat.
- Carter, Marva Griffin. The "New Negro" Legacy of Will Marion Cook. Afro-Americans in New York Life and History (1999). Vol.23 (1), p.25-37
- The "New Negro" Choral Legacy of Hall Johnson, Chorus and community, Ahlquist, Karen, ed. (2006). Urbana: University of Illinois Press. ISBN 0-252-03037-0. OCLC 62281651
- Weisenfeld, Judith (2011). "The Secret at the Root": Performing African American Religious Modernity in Hall Johnson's Run, Little Chillun. Religion and American Culture: A Journal of Interpretation. 21 (1): 39–80. doi:10.1525/rac.2011.21.1.39 ISSN 1052-1151
- Carter, Marva Griffin (2008). Swing along: the musical life of Will Marion Cook. Oxford University Press. ISBN 978-0-19-986579-6 OCLC 875519263
- Colloquy: Shadow Culture Narratives: Race, Gender, and American Music Historiography, Journal of the American Musicological Society (2020) 73 (3): 711–784.
