= Robert Parris =

America composer and academic (1924–1999)

Robert Parris (21 May 1924, Philadelphia, Pennsylvania – 5 December 1999, Washington, D. C.) was a composer and professor of music. Along with Robert Evett and Russell Woollen, he was one of a trifecta described by Irving Lowens as the "Washington School" of composers.

He was born in Philadelphia, attended the University of Pennsylvania, then the Juilliard School in New York. Among his teachers were Otto Luening, Aaron Copland, Jacques Ibert, and Peter Mennin (although he always claimed that the effect of these teachers on his own composing technique was 'minimal'). After a year of study on a Fulbright Fellowship in Paris (where he was meant to study with Arthur Honegger, but hardly ever saw him), and a year teaching at the University of Washington in Seattle, he settled in the Washington, D.C. area in 1952. Parris joined the faculty of The George Washington University in 1963 where he taught theory and composition.

Parris liked to describe himself as a 'colorist', and he therefore tended to write for small ensembles or a single instrument accompanied by piano or orchestra. His first international recognition came in 1958 with his Concerto for Five Kettledrums and Orchestra, premiered by tympanist Fred Begun and the National Symphony Orchestra in Washington, under Howard Mitchell. Parris was notorious for pushing instruments to the limits of any player's abilities: his solo violin sonata is particularly difficult, and the composer-directors of CRI believed his trombone concerto to be unplayable until they heard a recording of it. But he was also the most inventive of orchestrators: Parris's concerto for kettledrums was always a crowd-pleaser in performance because it was so surprisingly melodic: its last movement is built around a traditional hymn (like Copland's Appalachian Spring) but Parris gives the initial statements of that hymn—and its dramatic summation—to the kettledrums. Begun, the NSO principal tympanist who premiered the piece, made the original suggestion for the piece, but he later remarked, ""I suggested five drums jestingly."

In the sixties and seventies Parris was a sometime music critic for The Washington Post and the Washington Evening Star. In this period Parris—who taught himself Spanish—also turned to Borges for inspiration and produced the Book of Imaginary Beings (Part I) a work for flute (pic), violin, cello, piano, celeste, and percussion, from 1972. Part II was published in 1983.

A revival of the Concerto for Five Kettledrums and Orchestra, also in 1983, by the National Symphony Orchestra, under the direction of Mstislav Rostropovich, was such a success that it resulted in new performances of his Concerto for Trombone (first performed in 1964) by the NSO in 1985 and, then, to Parris's largest commission. His Symphonic Variations, performed in 1988 to great acclaim, was the result. A retrospective concert of his works at The George Washington University in this same year led Washington Post music critic Joseph McLellan to refer to Professor Parris as “one of (Washington’s) major music assets.”
