= Lawrence Carter =

Lawrence Carter or Larry Carter may refer to:

- Lawrence Carter (historian), American historian, professor, author, and civil rights expert
- Lawrence Carter (1641–1710), English lawyer and politician
- Lawrence Carter (judge) (1668–1745), English judge and politician
- Larry Carter (born 1965), American professional baseball pitcher and coach
- Larry Carter (runner) (born 1931), American long-distance runner, 1952 and 1953 All-American for the UCLA Bruins track and field team
