= Jean Ter-Merguerian =

French-Armenian violinist (1935–2015)

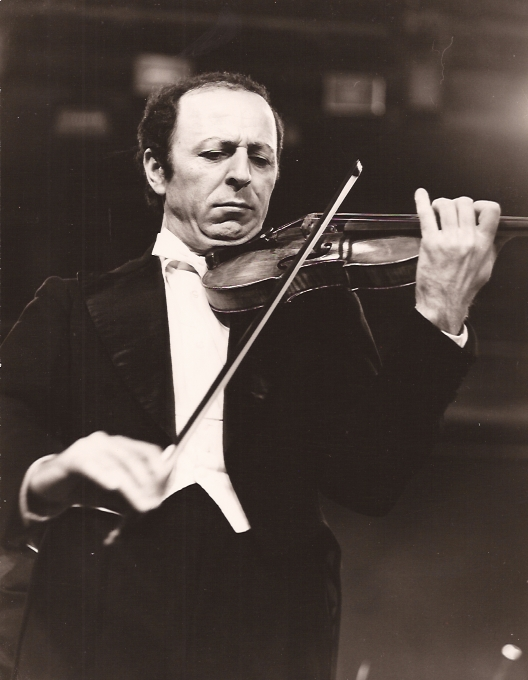
- in concert, 1970s

Background information
- Also known as: Merguirian / Mergherian / Mergerian / Mergerjan
- Born: Jean Ter-Merguerian; 5 October 1935; Marseille, France
- Died: 29 September 2015 (aged 79) Marseille, France
- Genre: Classical
- Occupations: Violinist, pedagogue
- Instruments: Nicolò Amati, violin
- Years active: 1946–2015

Jean Ter-Merguerian (Armenian: Ժան Տեր-Մերկերյան; Marseille, 5 October 1935 – Marseille, 29 September 2015) was a French-Armenian virtuoso violinist and violin pedagogue.

== Biography ==
Jean Ter-Merguerian has got the first prize for violin at the Marseille Conservatoire at the age of 11. In the same year, his first recital took place, where he performed Vivaldi's Concerto in A minor and Mendelssohn's Concerto in E minor with conductor André Audoli. In 1947 he immigrated to Soviet Armenia, where he continued his musical studies in Yerevan with Prof.. Karp Dombaïev and then in the Moscow Conservatory in the class of David Oistrakh. Jean Ter-Merguerian is a prizewinner of international violin competitions, such as Prague Spring (1956), Tchaikovsky Competition in Moscow, Queen Elisabeth in Bruxelles (1963). He also got the first Grand Prix at the Long-Thibaud Competition in Paris (1961). Along with his concert activities, in ex-USSR, Western Europe, Lebanon, South America, the United States, and Canada, he gave lectures at the Yerevan Komitas State Conservatory. He got the title of "People's Artist of the Armenian SSR". In 1981 he moved to his birthplace, Marseille.

In 1975, during his USA tour, he played in Boston the Violin Concerto by Brahms; The story goes that, at the conclusion of the concert, the conductor Arthur Fiedler, who was very hard to please and given to lavishing praise, embraced the young violinist on stage with paternal love and wished him success. This was the ringing endorsement of the talent of Jean Ter Merguerian, who had just given his first performance in the United States.

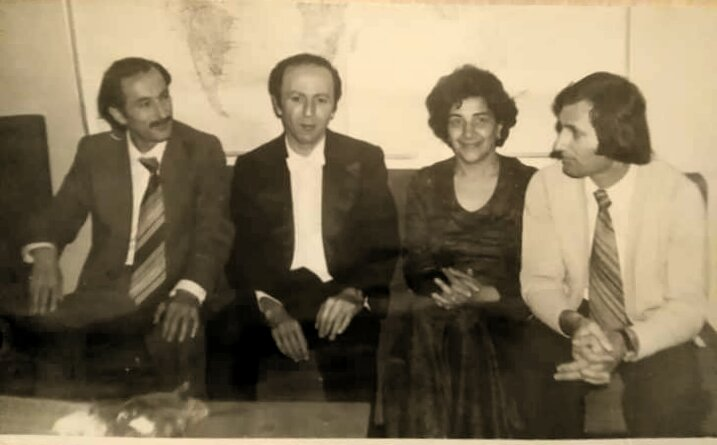
From left to right: Daniel Yerazhisht, Jean Ter-Merkeryan, pianist Ziline Zakaryan and clarinetist Albert Arakelyan

His solo performances were accompanied by orchestras of different countries conducted by famous conductors, also including Aram Khachaturian having conducted his own violin concerto. Jean Ter-Merguerian was also member of juries of international competitions: "Paganini" in Genoa, Italy, "Sarasate" in Pamplona, Spain, "Tchaikovsky" in Moscow and "Khachaturian" in Yerevan. He lived in France, giving master classes there and abroad. He played on a Nicolò Amati violin. Jean Ter-Merguerian died of cancer, after a long illness at his home in Marseille, on 29 September 2015. He is survived by his wife, the pianist Lilia, his son Vagram and his daughter.

== Recordings ==
Among recital and concert recordings by Jean Ter-Merguerian are two CD-Rs of live and archive broadcast material (CD-R 1 : "Selection from Performances" / CD-R 2 : "Khachaturian 100th"). The 1966 Armenian Radio broadcast recording of Bach Double Concerto is part of a 2CDs compilation dedicated to his colleague, the violinist Anahit Tsitsikian. In 1999 Jean Ter-Merguerian recorded his only commercial release: Gérard Gasparian's Violin Sonata (1990), with the composer himself at the piano (CD Timpani 1C1055). Armenian Radio TV archives are full of Jean Ter-Merguerian's audio and video recordings, yet to be discovered, some of them already on YouTube

== CDs ==
In 2020 Rhine Classics label released a 5CD box dedicated to his art "The soul of violin":

- RH-016 | 5CD | JEAN TER-MERGUERIAN - violin’s soul

=== Live, private, radio TV archives, uncommercial ===
composer	work	orchestra / conductor / accompanist	recording	source	note
Bach, Johann Sebastian	Chaconne, in D minor, BWV 1004	violin solo	live(1)	CD-R 1	
Mozart, Wolfgang Amadeus	Rondò (Serenade No.7 "Haffner" KV 250)	Zemphira Barseghian, piano	live(2)	CD-R 1	
Beethoven, Ludwig van	Violin Concerto Op.61, II. Larghetto	Armenian State Symphony O. / Loris Tjeknavorian, cond.	live(3)	CD-R 1	recording of 1st and 3rd mvmt. is probably lost
Beethoven, Ludwig van	Violin Concerto Op.61, III. Rondò (Allegro)	ORTF / Louis Fourestier, cond. (prize winner concert of the Marguerite Long–Jacques Thibaud Competition)	live Paris, 27 June 1961	VIDEO	
interview	ORTF interview at the "1st Grand Prize", Jean Ter-Merguerian, with Henryk Szeryng (Jury member)	after Prize winners Concert of the 9th Marguerite Long–Jacques Thibaud Competition	live Paris, 27 June 1961	VIDEO	
Sarasate, Pablo de	Habanera, Op.21/2 (Spanish Dance No.2)	Nelli Daniel-Bek, piano	studio(4)	CD-R 1	
Sarasate, Pablo de	Romanza andaluza, Op.22/1 (Spanish Dance No.3)	Nelli Daniel-Bek, piano	studio(4)	CD-R 1	
Sarasate, Pablo de	Capricho vasco (Caprice Basque), Op.24	Zemphira Barseghian, piano	live(2)	CD-R 1	
Scott, Cyril	Lotus Land, Op.47 No.1	Zemphira Barseghian, piano	studio(5)	CD-R 1	
Szymanowski, Karol	La Fontaine d'Arethousa, Op.30 No.1 ("Mythes")	Zemphira Barseghian, piano	studio(5)	CD-R 1	
Prokofiev, Sergei	Masks ("Romeo and Juliet", Suite Op.75) arr. Jascha Heifetz	Nelli Daniel-Bek, piano	studio(6)	CD-R 1	
Khachaturian, Aram	Ayshe's Dance ("Gayane", Ballet Suite No.2)	Nelli Daniel-Bek, piano	studio(6)	CD-R 1	
Komitas	Keler tsoler (Striding, Beaming), arr. Aram Shamshyan	Nelli Daniel-Bek, piano	live(7)	CD-R 1	
Komitas	Akh Maral jan (Ah, Dear Maral), arr. Aram Shamshyan	Nelli Daniel-Bek, piano	live(7)	CD-R 1	
Komitas	Groong (The Crane)	violin solo	live(8)	CD-R 1	
Sibelius, Jean	Violin Concerto, in D minor Op.47, II. Adagio di molto	Armenian State Symphony O. / Michael Malountian, cond.	live 1970s		I & III recording probably lost
Khachaturian, Aram	Violin Concerto, in D minor (1940)	Armenian State Symphony O. / Michael Malountian, cond.	radio(9)	CD-R 2	
Khachaturian, Aram	Dance in B-flat Major, Op.1	Nelli Daniel-Bek, piano	studio(6)	CD-R 2	
Khachaturian, Aram	Violin Concerto, in D minor (1940)	URSS State Symphony O. / Aram Khachaturian, cond.	live, 1970s		recording probably lost
Bach, Johann Sebastian	Double Concerto for 2 violins, in D minor, BWV 1043	Anahit Tsitsikian (I), Jean Ter-Merguerian (II) / Armenian Radio TV Symphony O. / Raphael Mangassarian, cond	live, 1966	CD	
Brahms, Johannes	Violin Concerto, in D major Op.77	Boston Symphony O. / Arthur Fiedler, cond.	live, 1975		
Khachaturian, Aram	Violin Concerto, in D minor (1940)	Erevan Symphony O. / Loris Tjeknavorian, cond.	late 1970s	VIDEO	recording of 2nd movement only
Gasparian, Gérard	Violin Sonata (1990)	Gérard Gasparian, piano	studio, 1999	CD Timpani 1C1055	

== Bibliography ==
- Jean Ter-Merguerian - L'Âme du violon (Ջութակի հոգին / Violin's soul), 176 pages, 2012, Armenian, Russian, French | ISBN 978-9939-0-0463-1
