= Music of the United States of America (publications) =

Series of American music of various genres

MUSA (Music of the United States of America) is a 41-volume series of critical editions of American music, representing the full range of genres and idioms that have contributed to American musical culture. It was established by the American Musicological Society in 1988 and is hosted by the University of Michigan at its American Music Institute. The criteria used in developing MUSA volumes are:

- That the series as a whole reflect breadth and balance among eras, genres, composers and performance media
- That it avoid music already available through other channels, duplicating only where new editions of available music seem essential
- That works in the series be representative, chosen to reflect particular excellence or to represent notable achievements in this country's highly varied music history

MUSA receives funding from the National Endowment for the Humanities and is published by A-R Editions of Madison, Wisconsin. The founding editor-in-chief of MUSA is Richard Crawford, and the current editors-in-chief are Mark Clague (University of Michigan) and Gayle Magee (University of Illinois, Urbana-Champaign).

== Publications ==
- MUSA 1: Music for Small Orchestra (1926); Suite No. 2 for Four Strings and Piano (1929) by Ruth Crawford
- MUSA 2: Early Songs, 1907–1914 by Irving Berlin
- MUSA 3: Quartet for Strings (In One Movement), Opus 89 by Amy Beach
- MUSA 4: Collected Works by Daniel Read
- MUSA 5: The Music and Scripts of In Dahomey by Will Marion Cook and Paul Laurence Dunbar and others
- MUSA 6: Psalmody and Secular Songs by Timothy Swan
- MUSA 7: Collected Songs, 1873-1896 by Harrigan and Braham
- MUSA 8: Keyboard and Chamber Music, 1937–1994 by Lou Harrison
- MUSA 9: Barstow – Eight Hitchhiker Inscriptions from a Highway Railing at Barstow, California (1968 Version) by Harry Partch
- MUSA 10: Performances in Transcription, 1927–1943 based on recordings by Thomas Wright "Fats" Waller
- MUSA 11: Writing American Indian Music: Historic Transcriptions, Notations, and Arrangements
- MUSA 12: 129 Songs by Charles Ives
- MUSA 13: Quintette for Piano and String Quartet by Leo Ornstein
- MUSA 14: American Victorian Choral Music by Dudley Buck
- MUSA 15: Selected Piano Solos, 1928–1941 based on recordings by Earl "Fatha" Hines
- MUSA 16: Complete Wind Chamber Music by David Moritz Michael
- MUSA 17: Surviving Orchestral Music by Charles Hommann
- MUSA 18: Four Saints in Three Acts by Virgil Thomson and Gertrude Stein
- MUSA 19: Symphonies Nos. 1 and 3 by Florence Price
- MUSA 20: Songs from "A New Circle of Voices": The Sixteenth Annual Pow-Wow at UCLA
- MUSA 21: Six Marches by John Philip Sousa
- MUSA 22: The Ingalls Wilder Family Songbook
- MUSA 23: Symphony no. 2 in D minor, op. 24 ("Jullien") by George Frederick Bristow
- MUSA 24: Sam Morgan's Jazz Band: Complete Recorded Works in Transcription based on recordings by Sam Morgan
- MUSA 25: Selected Works for Big Band, by Mary Lou Williams
- MUSA 26: Machito and His Afro-Cubans: Selected Transcriptions by Machito
- MUSA 27: Di goldene kale (1923) by Joseph Rumshinsky
- MUSA 28: The Padrone by George Whitefield Chadwick
- MUSA 29: Shuffle Along (1921) by Eubie Blake and Noble Sissle
- MUSA 30: Solo for Piano by John Cage, Second Realization by David Tudor
- MUSA 31: Appalachian Spring (Original Ballet Version) by Aaron Copland
- MUSA 32: An American Singing Heritage: Songs from the British-Irish-American Oral Tradition as Recorded in the Early Twentieth Century
