= Cynthia Adams Hoover =

American curator (born 1934)

- Born: December 16, 1934 (age 91); Nebraska, U.S.
- Occupation: Curator
- Awards: Guggenheim Fellowship (1985)

Academic background
- Education: Wellesley College; Radcliffe College; Brandeis University

Academic work
- Discipline: Music history
- Sub-discipline: History of musical instruments
- Institutions: National Museum of American History

Cynthia Adams Hoover (born December 16, 1934) is an American curator specializing in musical instruments. Born in Nebraska, she worked at the National Museum of American History as a curator of musical instruments from 1961 until 2004, and she was president of the International Council of Museums Committee for Museums and Collections of Instruments and Music from 1989 until 1995. A 1985 Guggenheim Fellow, her work includes the Smithsonian's project on the diary of piano manufacturer William Steinway.

== Biography ==
Cynthia Adams Hoover was born on December 16, 1934, in Lexington, Nebraska. She obtained her BA (1957) from Wellesley College, MAT (1958) from Radcliffe College, and MFA (1961) from Brandeis University.

Hoover started her career with Wellesley, where she was a teacher from 1958 until 1960. In 1961, she became an assistant curator of musical instruments at the National Museum of American History, before being promoted to associated curator in 1964 and eventually curator in 1975. She was the first chair of the Smithsonian Forum on Material Culture, serving from 1988 until 1996. In 2004, she retired as curator and was named curator emeritus.

Hoover specializes in the history of musical instruments in the United States. In 1985, she was awarded a Guggenheim Fellowship; among the projects completed on that fellowship was Piano 300, a Smithsonian exhibition on the history of the piano which had its catalogue published from Scarecrow Press in 2001. Other exhibitions she curated include Music in Early Massachusetts, Music Machines—American Style, and Nineteenth-Century American Ballroom Music, 1840–1860, and in addition to the Smithsonian she also worked with the Museum of Fine Arts, Boston.

In addition to curatorial work, Hoover also has work as a published author. She provided oversight for the annotations of the Smithsonian's project on the William Steinway diary, after seeing the original at a 1966 visit to one of the factories of his company Steinway & Sons, and she also helped bring the diaries into Smithsonian custody. She also appeared in newspapers as an expert on music history, particularly the history of musical instruments. In 1989, she became president of the International Council of Museums Committee for Museums and Collections of Instruments and Music (CIMCIM), serving until 1995. She was part of the advisory council behind the formation of the Musical Instrument Museum.

Hoover was awarded the 2022 Society for American Music Lifetime Achievement Award; the organization said that her "almost half-century record of achievements in support of the history of American music and musical instruments outside of the academy is remarkable".

In 1962, she married Roland Armitage Hoover, a printer and graphic designer. The couple had two daughters.

== Bibliography ==
- (with Dale Higbee, William Lichtenwanger, and Phillip T. Young) A Survey of Musical Instrument Collections in the United States and Canada (1974)
- (with Edwin M. Good and Patrick Rucker) Piano 300 (2001)
