= International Association for the Study of Popular Music =

- Abbreviation: IASPM
- Formation: September 1981
- Founders: Charles Hamm; Simon Frith
- Type: Learned society
- Purpose: Advancing the academic study of popular music
- Headquarters: Institute of Popular Music at the University of Liverpool, Liverpool, England
- Chair: Goffredo Plastino
- General secretary: Sue Miller
- Website: www.iaspm.net

The International Association for the Study of Popular Music (abbreviated IASPM) is an international learned society dedicated to the scholarly study of popular music. It was established in September 1981, with Charles Hamm and Simon Frith as two of its founding members. By 1988, it had members in over 30 countries. Since 2002, its official headquarters has been at the University of Liverpool's Institute of Popular Music, which is also the repository for the Association's archived materials.

The Journal of Popular Music Studies, published by the University of California Press, is the official journal of the Association's United States branch (abbreviated IASPM-US). It also published the IASPM Journal.
