= Liudmila Kovnatskaya =

Russian musicologist (1941–2023)

- Людмила Ковнацкая
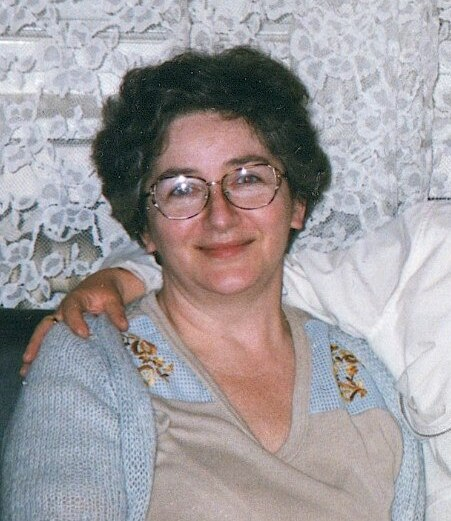
- Born: Liudmila Girshevna Kovnatskaya; 5 February 1941; Leningrad, Russian SFSR, USSR
- Died: 9 May 2023 (aged 82)
- Known for: Monograph on Britten
- Awards: The Scholar of the Year (1993, Cambridge Biographical Center); A. Belyaev Literary award (2001) for the book "Arnold Schoenberg. Correspondence" (St Petersburg, 2001); Honoured Art Worker of Russian Federation
- Scientific career
- Fields: Music history, musicology
- Workplaces: Professor at the St Petersburg State Conservatoire named after N. Rimsky-Korsakov; Chief Researcher at the Russian Institute of Fine Arts History in St Petersburg; Head of the regional department of the International Musicological Society (IMS)

Liudmila Grigorievna Kovnatskaya (5 February 1941 – 9 May 2023) was a Russian musicologist. She was a professor at the St Petersburg State Conservatoire named after N. Rimsky-Korsakov (1987), and the Chief Researcher at the Russian Institute of Fine Arts History in St Petersburg. She was considered an Honoured Art Worker of Russian Federation.

== Education ==
Kovnatskaya graduated in 1965 from two departments at the Leningrad State Conservatoire named after N. Rimsky-Korsakov: the department of History of Music and Piano Performing Faculty, and the department of Organ Playing, having studied under Prof. Isai Braudo. It was at the Conservatoire that she finished a postgraduate course in the department of History of Western Music, under the supervision of Prof. Dr Mikhail Druskin. In 1970 Liudmila Kovnatskaya presented a candidate dissertation on Benjamin Britten's oeuvre. In 1987 she completed a doctoral dissertation on English music of 20th century, at the Moscow research institute of Arts of Academy of Science, USSR.

== Professional experience ==
From 1987, Kovnatskaya was a member of Russian Composers’ Union, and she was a member of the General Council for Cultural Affairs of St Petersburg from 1987 until 1993. In 2002 she became a member of the Council (Directorium) of the IMS. In the same year, she became a member of the editorial board of the journal “Tempo” (Cambridge).

In 2001, Kovnatskaya became a materials consultant on Russian music for Grove’s Dictionary of Music and Musicians (London: McMillan, 2001). She was also a guest lecturer at the University of Manchester (1991), the Aldeburgh Festival (UK), and the Ural Conservatoire in Yekaterinburg.

Liudmila Kovnatskaya was the author of a monograph about Benjamin Britten (Moscow, 1974), in the book “English Music in the 20th Century: Sources and periods of development” (Moscow, 1986). Thanks to her research and organization activity in Russia, various festivals and concerts were organized, which were dedicated to English classic music, including Britten. Among them were “Ars Britannica” (1988–1990), the festival in honour of “The 80th anniversary of B. Britten” (1993), “The World of Ralph Vaughan Williams” (1996), the festival of Britten's music on his 85th anniversary (1998), the jubilee concert in honour of Britten and Saint Cecilia, patron saint of musicians (2003), the concert “World of Opera: Benjamin Britten”, and others.

Kovnatskaya's research fields include History of Russian Music; she has written, edited and compiled books and articles on D. Shostakovich. Among her non-published manuscripts one can find a monumental work entitled “Ideological control of Musical avant-garde of 1920s: Leningrad Association of Contemporary Music in reports and other materials” (Soros Foundation Funding).

A separate field of her research and publishing activity is the ‘offering to the Teacher’, who was a famous musicologist and Professor of Leningrad Conservatoire Mikhail Druskin. In 2009, thanks to Prof. Kovnatskaya, a two-volume collection was published, entitled “Memory to Mikhail Semenovich Druskin”, which united articles, recollections, biographical materials and correspondence. All who knew M. Druskin as a musician, musicologist and teacher took part in the creation of this 1000 page book. Furthermore, in addition to this, Liudmila Kovnatskaya led the task of re-publishing works by Druskin and, as a result, realized an extensive project: a 7-volume Collected Works. At present, the first volume, “Clavir music”, and the fourth volume, “Igor Stravinsky”, are published.

In 2002, Liudmila Kovnatskaya received a literary prize and a medal named after Belyaev for the book “Arnold Schoenberg. Letters "(Translated by V. G. Schnittke, editor M. Druskin. Saint Petersburg, 2001 - 464 p.). In 2013 she published the three-volume edition Shostakovich at the Leningrad Conservatory: 1919–1930), which was awarded the title “Book of the Year - 2013” ("Musical Review" newspaper). In 2013, Liudmila Kovnatskaya received the title "Person of the Year - 2013" (newspaper "Musical Review"). In 2016 she received the "RESONANCE" prize for her contribution to the development of musical and theatrical criticism (Diaghilev Festival, Perm, June 2016).

== Death ==
Kovnatskaya died on 9 May 2023, at the age of 82.

== Books ==
- The Main Themes: Britten, Shostakovich and Others / eds.: O. B. Manulkina, N. V. Gradoboeva. St Petersburg : N. I. Novikov Publishers; Galina Scripsit Publishing House, 2018. 492 p.
- Research “Ideological control of Musical avant-garde of 1920s (Leningrad Association of Contemporary Music in reports and other materials” – 1997–1999. A Grant-holder of the George Soros Foundation (“The Open Society” Institute) –– manuscript
- English music in the 20th century. Sources and periods of development. Moscow: Sovietsky Kompozitor, 1986. 216 pp.
- Benjamin Britten. Moscow: Sovietsky Kompozitor, 1974. 392 pp.

== Books and collections (editor, co-editor) ==
- Braudo I. About organ and clavier music / eds.: A. Braudo, M. Druskin, L. Kovnatskaya. Leningrad : Muzyka, 1976. 172 p.
- History and Modernity. Collection of articles to 75th anniversary of M. S. Druskin / ed. by L. Kovnatskaya together with M. D. Sabinina and A. I. Klimovitsky. Leningrad : Sovietsky Kompozitor, 1981. 286 p.
- Traditions of musicology : collection of research articles / ed. by L. Kovnatskaya. Leningrad : Sovietsky Kompozitor, 1989. 204 p.
- Komarov I. Articles and essays / ed. by E. Fedorova together with L. Kovnatskaya. St Petersburg : Sovietsky Kompozitor, 1992. 112 p.
- Orlov G. Tree of music / ed. by L. Kovnatskaya. Washington (DC) : H. F. Frager & Co; St Petersburg : Sovietsky Kompozitor, 1992. 408 p. [2nd ed., 2005; 3rd ed., 2015]
- D. D. Shostakovich : Collection to the 90th anniversary. St Petersburg : Kompozitor, 1996. 389 p.
- Memory to N. S. Rabinovitch. Essays, memoirism, documents. Washington (DC) : H. Frager & Co., 1996. 246 p.
- Arensky P. A. Musical dictionary for exiles. Letters (from the personal archive of M. L. Rostropovitch). St Petersburg : Severnij olen’, 1999. 104 p.
- D. D. Shostakovich: Between the moment and eternity. Documents. Articles. Publications. St Petersburg, 2000. 917 p.
- Schoenberg A. Letters / transl. in Russian by V. G. Schnitke; ed. by M. S. Druskin, L. Kovnatskaya. St Petersburg : Kompozitor; Pro Arte, 2001. 464 p. [2nd ed., 2008]
- The New Grove Dictionary of Music and Musicians : in 29 vols. 2nd ed. / ed. by Stanley Sadie; executive ed. John Tyrrell; external advisory ed. Ludmila Kovnatskaya. London, etc.: Macmillan, 2001. [2nd ed., repr. with minor corr., 2002]
- Druskin M. History of Foreign Music. Second half of 19th century. Vol. 4. 7th ed. St Petersburg : Kompozitor, 2002. 630 p. (editorial member together with V. V. Smirnov, A. K. Koenigsberg and N. I. Degtyareva).
- Schweitzer A. I. S. Bach / transl. in Russian by Ya. S. Druskin and H. A. Strekalovskaya; ed. by L. G. Kovnatskaya. Moscow : Klassika–XXI, 2002. 808 p. [2nd ed., 2004; 3rd ed., 2011; 4th ed., 2016]
- Cantus Planus–2002. Russian version. Vol. 1 / ed. by A. Vovk. St Petersburg : Kompozitor, 2004. 371 p.
- Dmitry Shostakovich : Studies and materials. Vol. 1. Moscow : DSCH, 2005. 209 p.
- D. D. Shostakovich. Letters to I. I. Sollertinsky. St Petersburg : Kompozitor, 2006. 276 p.
- Dmitry Shostakovich : Studies and materials. Vol. 2 / eds.: O. Digonskaya and L. Kovnatskaya. Moscow : DSCH, 2007. 286 p.
- Druskin M. S. Collected Works : in 7 vols. / ed. by L. G. Kovnatskaya. Vol. 1: Clavier music of Spain, England, Netherlands, France, Italy, Germany in 16th – 18th centuries / ed.-compl. L. G. Kovnatskaya; ed. board: I. V. Rozanov and oth. St Petersburg : Kompozitor, 2007. 751 p.
- Druskin M. S. Collected Works : in 7 vols. / ed. by L. G. Kovnatskaya. Vol. 4: Igor Stravinsky. Eds: L. G. Kovnatskaya, V. P. Varunts, O. B. Manulkina, N. A. Braginskaya, L. O. Ader. St Petersburg : Kompozitor, 2009. 584 p.
- Memory to Mikhail Semenovich Druskin: in 2 vols. Vol. 1: Articles. Memoires / eds.: L. G. Kovnatskaya, A. K. Koenigsberg, L. V. Miheeva. Materials preparation: L. O. Ader; O. N. Tchumikova. St Petersburg State Conservatoire named after N. A. Rimsky-Korsakov. St Petersburg : Allegro, 2009. 583 p. Vol. 2: From correspondence. 427 p.
- Russian-British musical connections : collection of articles / eds. L. G. Kovnatskaya, M. P. Mischenko, O. N. Tchumikova. St Petersburg, 2009. 384 p.
- Dmitry Shostakovich : Studies and materials. Vol. 3 / eds.: O. Digonskaya and L. Kovnatskaya. Moscow : DSCH, 2011. 263 p.
- Dmitry Shostakovich : Studies and materials. Vol. 4 / eds.: O. Digonskaya and L. Kovnatskaya. Moscow : DSCH, 2012. 271 p.
- Druskin M. S. Collected Works : in 7 vols. Vol. 5: Russian revolutionary song / ed. by L. G. Kovnatskaya and S. V. Podrezova. St Petersburg : Kompozitor, 2012. 799 p.
- North in traditional cultures and professional schools of composition : collection of articles / ed. by L. G. Kovnatskaya. Petrozavodsk : PetrGU, 2012. 370 p.
- Britten : collection of articles / eds.: A. Genina and L. Kovnatskaya. Moscow : Book Centre Rudomino, 2013. 363 p.
- (Un)Musical Offering, or Allegro affettuoso : Collection of articles to the 65th anniversary of Boris Aronovich Katz / ed.-comp.: A. Dolinin, I. Doronchenkov, L. Kovnatskaya, N. Mazur. St Petersburg : Publishing House of European University, 2013. 672 p.
- Shostakovich at the Leningrad Conservatory: 1919–1930 : in 3 vols. / D. Shostakovich’s Archive, Moscow; Central state archive of film and photo documents of St Petersburg; author of the project and editor-comp. L. Kovnatskaya; ed. board: L. Kovnatskaya, A. Petrova, L. Ader, P. Gershenzon. Vol. 1: Addresses and routes (1). Studying process. 252 p.; Vol. 2: Friends-buddies. Native speech. Crafts workshop. Addresses and routes (2). 408 p.; Vol. 3. City-theater. GATOB. MALEGOT. TRAM, GosTIM, Musical Comedy. Cinema. Concerts. Big Hall. 488 p. St Petersburg : Kompozitor, 2013.
- Braudo I. Articulation (on the pronunciation of the melody). About organ and clavier music / comp. A. I. Braudo; ed. board: L. G. Kovnatskaya, S. M. Maltsev, M. P. Mishchenko. St Petersburg, 2014. 395 p.
- Chronicle of the life and work of D. D. Shostakovich : in 5 vols. Vol. 1: 1903–1930 / project idea: I. A. Shostakovich, M. A. Yakubov; project coordinator and sponsor I. A. Shostakovich; project manager L. G. Kovnatskaya; ed. board: M. I. Aleinikov, V. S. Velichko, N. V. Gradoboeva, O. G. Digonskaya, L. G. Kovnatskaya, L. A. Miller; executive ed. L. A. Miller; scientific ed. O. G. Digonskaya. Moscow : DSCH, 2016. 582 p.

32. Druskin M. S. Collected works : in 7 vols. / ed. by L. G. Kovnatskaya. Vol. 6: Selected articles. St Petersburg: Kompozitor – St Petersburg, 2018.765 p.

== Articles in collection and monographs ==
- Benjamin Britten. In: Muzykalnaya zhizn’. 1968. No. 10. P. 15–7.
- English ballad. In: Muzykalnaya zhizn’. 1969. No. 19. P. 21–2.
- Britten and traditions of English folk music genres. In: Iz istorii muzyki 20 veka. Moscow : Muzyka, 1971. P. 208–25.
- From the history of English ethnography. In: Sovietskaya muzyka. 1971. No. 7. P. 137–40.
- Concert in memory of Stravinsky. In: Sovietskaya muzyka. 1972. No. 5. P. 77–8.
- Folk elements of vocal melodies by Britten. In: Problemy muzykalnoj nauki. Collection of articles. Vol. 1. Moscow : Sovetsky kompozitor, 1972. P. 298–325.
- An outstanding master. To the 60th anniversary of B. Britten. In: Sovietskaya muzyka. 1973. No. 11. P. 117–23.
- Lillian Libman. “And Music at the Close…”: Stravinsky’s Last Years. In: Sovietskaya muzyka. 1973. No. 5. P. 122–9.
- About new English musical revival. In: Sovietskaya muzyka. 1973. No. 7. P. 118–25.
- Roy Harris (USA). In: Sovietskaya muzyka. 1973. No. 10. P. 134–5.
- Devotion to Music : to the 70th anniversary of M. S. Druskin. In: Sovietskaya muzyka. 1975. No. 4. P. 63–7. (together with G. Orlov and I. Khlebarov)
- “Dido and Aeneas” by Henry Purcell. In: Purcell H. Dido and Aeneas: opera in 3 acts: clavier / libretto by N. Tate based on Virgil’s poem “Aeneid”. Leningrad : Muzyka, 1975. P. 3.
- Coryphaeus of English music. To 100-year anniversary of Gustav Holst. In: Sovietskaya muzyka. 1975. No. 1. P. 134–5.
- Artist, teacher, scientist. In: Braudo I. About organ and clavier music / eds.: A. Braudo, M. Druskin, L. Kovnatskaya. Leningrad : Muzyka, 1976. P. 3–12, 150–2.
- Valentin Nesterov and his choir. In: Sovietskaya muzyka. 1977. No. 5. P. 76–80.
- To 250-years of “The Beggar’s Opera”. In: Sovietskaya muzyka. 1978. No. 5. P. 105–9.
- Michael Tippett (75-year anniversary of a British composer). In: Sovietskaya muzyka. 1980. No. 11. P. 123–9.
- Foreword and comments. In: Westrep J. Henry Purcell / transl. from English A. Kochneva. Leningrad : Muzyka, 1980. P. 3–4.
- Artist, teacher, scientist / Braudo I. Articulation (on the pronunciation of the melody). In: Musikalni Horizonti. Sofia, 1981. No. 11/12. P. 3–14.
- To the biography of M. Druskin. In: History and modernity : collection of articles / eds.: A. I. Klimovitsky, L. G. Kovnatskaya, M. D. Sabinina. Leningrad : Sovietsky Kompozitor, 1981. P. 261–80.
- Master on the threshold of his 80th birthday: William Walton. In: Sovietskaya muzyka. 1982. No. 2. P. 99–103.
- Michael Tippet and his opera King Priam. In: Ocherki po istorii zarubezhnoj muzyki 20 veka. Leningrad : Muzyka, 1983. P. 40–58.
- Warning to those who are alive (“War Requiem” by Britten). In: Muzykalnaya zhizn’. 1984. No. 9. P. 15–6.
- Composers of England. In: Musyka 20 veka. Moscow : Muzyka, 1987. P. 269–93.
- The opera “Death in Venice” by B. Britten. In: Musikalni Horizonti. Sofia, 1987. No. 3. P. 59–73.
- To the creative characteristic of Benjamin Britten. In: Musikalni Horizonti. Sofia, 1988. No. 10. P. 53–74.
- About I. A. Braudo. In: Leningradskaya konservatorija v vospominanijakh. Vol. 2. Leningrad : Muzyka, 1988. P. 97–101.
- From the history of the choral development in England. In: Musikalni Horizonti. Sofia, 1990. No. 9. P. 41–58.
- History and story: English National Opera in Leningrad. In: Iskusstvo Leningrada. 1990. No. 12. P. 73–8.
- A life in letters (“Letters from a Life”: to 80 year anniversary of B. Britten). In: Muzykalnaya akademija. 1993. No. 4. P. 214–21.
- Russian Funeral through Russian ears: oral impressions and some questions. In: International Journal of Musicology. 1993. Vol. 2. P. 321–32.
- Alexander Knaifel. “Chapter Eight”. Canticum Canticorum. In: Muzykalnoe obozrenie. 1995. No. 7/8. P. 18.
- “To return Stravinsky home, to return him for motherland...” (A shorthand record and materials of discussion of Druskin’s book about Stravinsky). In: Muzykalnaya akademija. 1995. No. 4/5. P. 195–229.
- Note on a Theme from “Peter Grimes”. In: On Mahler and Britten. Essays in Honour of Donald Mitchell on His Seventieth Birthday. London : The Boydell Press, 1995. P. 172–85.
- From the editorial board. In: D. D. Shostakovich : collection of articles to the 90th anniversary of his birth. St Petersburg : Kompozitor, 1996. P. 5–7.
- Shostakovich in LASM protocols. In: D. D. Shostakovich. Collection of articles to 90 year anniversary. St Petersburg : Kompozitor, 1996. P. 48–67.
- Shostakovich and Britten: Some parallels. In: D. D. Shostakovich. Collection of articles to 90 year anniversary. St Petersburg : Kompozitor, 1996. P. 306–32.
- Sprawoznania: Irina Nikolska: Ot Szymanovskogo do Lutoclavskogo i Piendierieckogo. Ocherki razvitiya simfonicheskoy muziki v Polsze XX wieka. Moscow : Sowietskij Kompozitor, 1990. In: Muzyka. Warzsaw. 1997. No. 1. S. 129–33.
- Works by M. S. Druskin. In: Issledovanija. Publizistika. To 20th anniversary of Musical critic department. Collection of articles. St Petersburg : St Petersburg State Conservatoire named after N. A. Rimsky-Korsakov, 1997. P. 332–7.
- “Peter Grimes” at the Kirov opera and ballet theater. In: Melos. En Musiktidskrift. 1997. No. 19/20. P. 64–71.
- Benjamin Britten – Song cycle “The Poet’s Echo” on poems by Pushkin (English ‘echo’ of Russian poet). In: Muzykalnoe prinoshenie to 75-year anniversary of E. A. Ruchevskaya. St Petersburg : Kanon, 1998. P. 194–220.
- “The Cherubic Hymn”: about an unknown author’s draft by M. A. Balakirev. In: Balakirevu posvyaschaetsya. Collection of articles to 160-year anniversary of the composer (1836–1996). St Petersburg : Kanon, 1998. P. 113–39.
- He also was ‘a survivor from Warsaw’. In: Muzykalnaya akademija. 1998. No. 3–4. P. 273–5.
- Shostakovich and the LASM. In: Tempo. 1998. No. 206. P. 2–6.
- Letter and message. In: Musicae Ars et Scientia : Book in honor of the 70th anniversary of N. A. Gerasimovf-Persidskaya. Kiev, 1999. P. 11–2.
- Last opera by Britten (introduction to a masterpiece). In: Muzykalnij teatr 19–20 vekov: voprosi evolutsii. Rostov-na-Donu : Gefest, 1999. P. 163–80.
- Opera under the arch of church (Triptych by Benjamin Britten — Parables for performing in the church). In: Four centuries of opera: Opera schools of the 19th and 20th centuries. Kiev : NMAU, 2000. P. 193–200.
- From the editor-compiler. In: Shostakovich: Between the moment and eternity. Documents. Materials. Articles. St Petersburg : Kompozitor, 2000. P. 3–8.
- Shostakovich and Bogdanov-Berezovsky (1920s). In: D. D. Shostakovich: Between the moment and eternity. Documents. Articles. Publications. St Petersburg, 2000. P. 16–59.
- Postcard of Dmitry Shostakovich and Nina Varzar from evacuation / publ. Nikolai Khrushchov; comment. L. G. Kovnatskaya. In: Shostakovich: Between the moment and eternity. P. 425–7.
- An episode from the book life. An interview with Genrikh Orlov. In: D. D. Shostakovich: Between the moment and eternity. Documents. Articles. Publications. St Petersburg, 2000. P. 717–38.
- “What do they write you from USSR? For me – a little”. Correspondence of S. Prokofiev and M. Druskin (publication, introduction, comments and conclusion). In: Muzykalnaya akademija. 2000. No. 2. P. 203–16.
- Shostakovich and Britten: Some Parallels. In: Shostakovich in Context. Oxford University Press, 2000. P. 175–89.
- Benjamin Britten. In: History of Foreign Music. Vol. 6: Early XX century – mid XX century / ed. by V. V. Smirnov. St Petersburg : Kompozitor, 2001. P. 581–626.
- Music of Britain. In: Istorija zarubezhnoj muzyki. Vol. 6: The beginning of 20th century – first half of 20th century. St Petersburg : Kompozitor, 2001. P. 581–626.
- Foreword. In: Schoenberg A. Letters / St. Petersburg Foundation for Culture and Art “Institute PRO ARTE”; comp. and publ. Erwin Stein; eds.: M. Druskin, L. Kovnatskaya. St Petersburg : Kompozitor, 2001. P. 9–35. [Same in: 2nd ed., 2008]
- Prokofiev and Britten (about historical parallels, influences and reminiscences). In: Otrazhenija muzykalnogo teatra. Book 2. Collection of articles and materials to an anniversary of L. G. Danko. St Petersburg : Kanon, 2001. P. 50–69.
- I. S. Bach in life of brothers Druskins (in collaboration with M. Mischenko). In: Albert Schweitzer. I. S. Bach. Moscow : Klassika – XXI, 2002. P. 657–83.
- Literary notes of M. S. Druskin. In: Orchestra: a collection of articles and materials in honor of Inna Alekseevna Barsova / Moscow state conservatory; editorial board: G. I. Lyzhov, D. R. Petrov, S. I. Savenko. Moscow: Moscow Conservatory, 2002. P. 394–411.
- Bach’s story in Petersburg musical context of 20th century. In: Petersburgskaya konservatorija v mirovom muzykalnom prozesse. 1862–2002. International conference proceeding of the session dedicated to 140-years anniversary of the Conservatoire (17–19 September 2002). St Petersburg : St Petersburg State Conservatoire, 2002. P. 107–10.
- LASM — what was it? In: Vremen svyazujuschaya nit’. Collection to anniversary of E. S. Barutcheva. St Petersburg, 2004. P. 139–47.
- About I. A. Braudo. In: Braudo I. About the study of Bach’s clavier works in the music school. St Petersburg, 2004. P. 87–90.
- Dialogues about Shostakovich: From the History of Russian Studies about Shostakovich. In: A Shostakovich Casebook / ed. by Malcolm Hamrick Brown. Bloomington and Indianapolice : Indiana University Press, 2004. P. 238–53.
- An Episode in the Life of a Book: An Interview with Henry Orlov. In: A Shostakovich Casebook / ed. by Malcolm Hamrick Brown. Bloomington and Indianapolice : Indiana University Press. 2004. P. 97–126.
- Returning to the printed: [about the publications of Yu. Korev about M. S. Druskin]. In: Muzykal’naya akademiya. 2005. No. 4. P. 200–1.
- High tragedy of personality and being. In: Muzykal’naya akademiya. 2005. No. 3. P. 51–4.
- From the history of IMS. In: Musicus. 2005. No. 4. P. 19–20.
- Irrecoverable loss: [dedication to Viktor Varunts]. In: Muzykal’naya akademiya. 2005. No. 1. P. 87–9.
- The word about M. S. Druskin. In: Musicus. 2005. No. 2. P. 7–16.
- “My first friend...” (Letters from D. D. Shostakovich to I. I. Sollertinsky). In: Muzykal’naya zhizn’. 2006. No. 9. P. 27–33.
- Opera under the arch of church (Triptych by Benjamin Britten). In: Life of religion in Music. Collection of articles. St Petersburg : Sudarinya, 2006. P. 199–208.
- Foreword. In: Shostakovich D. D. Letters to I. I. Sollertinsky / publ. D. I. Sollertinsky; foreword L. G. Kovnatskaya; comment.: O. L. Dansker, L. G. Kovnatskaya, G. V. Kopytova and others. St Petersburg : Kompozitor, 2006. P. 3–16.
- Genrikh Alexandrovich Orlov. In: Musicus. 2007. No. 9. P. 68–71.
- Materials for the biography of M. S. Druskin / publ. and comment. L. G. Kovnatskaya. In: Druskin M. S. Collected Works : in 7 vols. / ed. by L. G. Kovnatskaya. Vol. 1: Clavier music of Spain, England, Netherlands, France, Italy, Germany in 16th – 18th centuries / ed.-compl. L. G. Kovnatskaya. Ed. board: I. V. Rozanov and oth. St Petersburg : Kompozitor, 2007. P. 570–625.
- Nadezhda Golubovskaya and Benjamin Britten: a sketch of the plot. In: Tribute to Nadezhda Golubovskaya / SPbGK; ed.-comp.: T. Zaitseva, S. Zakaryan-Rutstein, V. Smirnov. St Petersburg, 2007. P. 302–18.
- The role of the peacemaker was his role: (memories of G. G. Tigranov). In: G. G. Tigranov: collection of articles, dedicated to 100th anniversary of G. G. Tigranov / SPbGK; ed. by E. S. Barutcheva. St Petersburg, 2008. P. 343–47.
- Funny letters: from the correspondence between Ya. S. Druskin and M. S. Druskin. In: Collection of scientific articles and essays dedicated to the anniversary of Nina Alexandrovna Gerasimova-Persidskaya. Kiev, 2008. P. 223–42.
- Happiness of communication. In: Feinberg Evgeny Lvovich: Personality through the prism of memory / under total. ed. by V. L. Ginzburg. Moscow: FIZMATLIT, 2008. P. 153–9.
- Mikhail Semenovich Druskin. Life milestones. In: Memory to Mikhail Semenovich Druskin : in 2 vols. Vol. 1: Articles. Memoires / eds.: L. G. Kovnatskaya, A. K. Koenigsberg, L. V. Miheeva. Materials preparation: L. O. Ader, O. N. Tchumikova. St Petersburg : Allegro, 2009. P. 8–52.
- Druskin as a scientist. In: Memory to Mikhail Semenovich Druskin : in 2 vols. Vol. 1. P. 101–21.
- To the reader. In: Memory to Mikhail Semenovich Druskin : in 2 vols. Vol. 2: From correspondence / eds.: L. G. Kovnatskaya, A. K. Koenigsberg, L. V. Miheeva. Materials preparation: L. O. Ader; O. N. Tchumikova. St Petersburg : Allegro, 2009. 583 p. Vol. 2: From correspondence. P. 3–6.
- Letters of A. E. Parnis / publ. L. Kovnatskaya; entry art. M. Druskin; comment.: V. Sazhina and L. Ader. In: Memory to Mikhail Semenovich Druskin : in 2 vols. Vol. 2. P. 7–21.
- Letters from E. Ejmsgejmer / publ. and comment. L. Kovnatskaya; transl., entry art. and comment. O. Chumikova. In: Memory to Mikhail Semenovich Druskin : in 2 vols. Vol. 2. P. 22–8.
- From the correspondence with V. J. Konen / publ. and entry art. L. Kovnatskaya; comments: L. Ader, L. Kovnatskaya, O. Chumikova. In: Memory to Mikhail Semenovich Druskin : in 2 vols. Vol. 2. P. 62–101.
- From the correspondence with F. M. Gershkovich / publ., entry art. and comment. L. Kovnatskaya. In: Memory to Mikhail Semenovich Druskin : in 2 vols. Vol. 2. P. 124–82.
- From correspondence with Ya. S. Druskin / publ., entry art. and comment. L. Kovnatskaya. In: Memory to Mikhail Semenovich Druskin : in 2 vols. Vol. 2. P. 183–226.
- From the correspondence with G. A. Orlov / publ. and entry art. L. Kovnatskaya and G. Orlov; comment. L. Ader and L. Kovnatskaya. In: Memory to Mikhail Semenovich Druskin : in 2 vols. Vol. 2. P. 227–372.
- I. F. Stravinsky in the life of M. S. Druskin. In: Druskin M. S. Collected Works : in 7 vols. Vol. 4: Igor Stravinsky / eds.: L. G. Kovnatskaya and others. St Petersburg : Kompozitor, 2009. P. 5–18.
- “To return Stravinsky home, to return to his motherland...” : Minutes of discussion of the book “Igor Stravinsky” by M. Druskin at the Leningrad Conservatory on April 19, 1975 / transcript, publ. and comment. L. G. Kovnatskaya. In: Druskin M. S. Collected Works : in 7 vols. Vol. 4. P. 5–18.
- Druskin M. The word about Stravinsky / publ. and foreword by L. G. Kovnatskaya. In: Druskin M. S. Collected Works : in 7 vols. Vol. 4. P. 400–5.
- Druskin in dialogue / publ. L. Kovnatskaya. In: Druskin M. S. Collected Works : in 7 vols. Vol. 4. P. 497–540.
- From the history of “Dialogues” / entry art., publ. and comment. L. Kovnatskaya. In: Druskin M. S. Collected Works : in 7 vols. Vol. 4. P. 406–40.
- Mikhail Druskin to Igor Stravinsky / publ.: L. Kovnatskaya and V. Varunts; comment. L. Ader. In: Druskin M. S. Collected Works : in 7 vols. Vol. 4. P. 541–8.
- Letters about the book / publ. and comment. L. G. Kovnatskaya. In: Druskin M. S. Collected Works : in 7 vols. Vol. 4. P. 346–59.
- English echo of Russian poetry. Britten’s vocal cycle to the verses of Pushkin. In: Russian-British musical connections. P. 272–96.
- Pearce P. From the “Travel Diary” / transl. O. Manulkina; entry art. L. Kovnatskaya; comments: L. Ader, L. Kovnatskaya, O. Manulkina. In: Russian-British musical connections. P. 297–342.
- Voices of the Past: from the correspondence of M. S. Druskin and G. A. Orlov / publ., entry art., comment. L. G. Kovnatskaya. In: This diverse world of music... : collection of articles to the 80th anniversary of M. G. Aranovsky / The State Institute for Art Studies; ed.-comp.: Z. A. Imamutdinova, A. A. Baeva, N. O. Vlasova. Moscow: Kompozitor, 2010. P. 238–59.
- Two letters from Richter. In: December evenings. Svyatoslav Richter: to the 30th anniversary of the festival / The Pushkin State Museum of Fine Arts. Moscow, 2010. P. 71–4, 77, 84, 87.
- [Book review] Ekaterina Vlasova. “1948 in Soviet music”. In: Opera musicologica. 2010. No. 3. P. 140–9.
- Yu. A. Kremlev in dialogues about D. D. Shostakovich: around the Tenth Symphony. In: From the fund of the Cabinet of manuscripts: messages, publications / ed.-comp. G. V. Kopytova. St Petersburg : Russian Institute of Art History, 2010. P. 148–66.
- Apology of the textbook. In: Human voice: to the 100th anniversary of the birth of V. J. Konen (1909–1991) : memoirs, letters, art / MGK; ed. board: Z. B. Kartasheva, M. A. Saponov (editor-in-chief), E. L. Feinberg. Moscow : Moscow Conservatory, 2011. P. 208–13.
- From the history of contemporaneity of the 1920s: Petrograd society for the propaganda of modern Russian music (based on archival materials and documents). In: Fioretti musicali: materials of the scientific conference in honor of I. A. Barsova / ed. board: S. I. Savenko, G. I. Lyzhov, D. R. Petrov. Moscow : Moscow Conservatory, 2011. P. 136–48.
- “I want to chat with you about something on paper”: Unknown letters from Bogdanov-Berezovsky to Shostakovich (1920s). In: Dmitry Shostakovich: Research and materials. Vol. 3 / ed.-comp.: O. Digonskaya, L. Kovnatskaya. Moscow: DSCH, 2011. P. 46–123.
- Yu. A. Kremlev in dialogues about D. D. Shostakovich: around the Tenth Symphony. In: The world of musicology: strategies, discourses, plots; dedicated to Elena Sergeevna Zinkevich. Kiev, 2011. P. 110–35.
- Once again about Shostakovich’s Hindemith. In: Dmitry Shostakovich: Research and materials. Vol. 4 / ed.-comp.: O. Digonskaya, L. Kovnatskaya. Moscow: DSCH, 2012. C. 131–63.
- To the ideal interlocutor. In: Gerasimova-Persidskaya N. Music. Time. Space. Kiev: Duh i litera, 2012. P. 9–16.
- The institute days and years of M. S. Druskin in the context of 1920–1990. In: Vremennik of the Zubovsky Institute : collection of articles. Vol. 9 : Zubovsky Institute: times, generations, destinies / [ed.-comp. E. V. Khazdan]. St Petersburg : Russian Institute of Art History, 2012. P. 7–17.
- Schostakowitschs Hindemith: die verbotene Wahrheit // Musik, Raum, Akkord, Bild Festschrift zum 65. Geburtstag von Dorothea Baumann = Music, space, chord, image: Festschrift for Dorothea Baumannʼs 65th birthday / hrsg. von Antonio Baldassarre. Bern, etc. : Peter Lang, 2012. S. 437–458.
- Šostakovičs Hindemith: die verbotene Wahrheit // Hindemith Institut Frankfurt. 2012. T. XLI. S. 85–112.
- Britten and Russia: [instead of an afterword]. In: Britten : collection of articles / eds.: A. Genina and L. Kovnatskaya. Moscow : Book Centre Rudomino, 2013. P. 353–64.
- From the compiler. In: Shostakovich at the Leningrad Conservatory: 1919–1930 : in 3 vols. / D. Shostakovich’s Archive, Moscow; Central state Archive of film and photo documents of St Petersburg, author of the project and ed.-comp. L. Kovnatskaya, ed. board: L. Kovnatskaya, A. Petrova, L. Ader, P. Gershenzon. Vol. 1. St Petersburg: Kompozitor, 2013. P. 8–11.
- Looking for Friendship. In: Shostakovich at the Leningrad Conservatory: 1919–1930 : in 3 vols. Vol. 2. P. 12–8.
- Bogdanov-Berezovsky. In: Shostakovich at the Leningrad Conservatory: 1919–1930 : in 3 vols. Vol. 2. P. 18–30.
- Sollertinsky. In: Shostakovich at the Leningrad Conservatory: 1919–1930 : in 3 vols. Vol. 2. P. 108–17.
- The Nutcracker Incident. In: Shostakovich at the Leningrad Conservatory: 1919–1930 : in 3 vols. Vol. 3. P. 103–5.
- Benjamin Britten’s Mahler Circle. In: Gustav Mahler and the Musical Culture of His Time / Moscow Conservatory; ed.-comp.: I. A. Barsova and I. V. Viskova. Moscow, 2013. P. 53–92.
- Teacher and students: scientific methods of M. S. Druskin in projection on pedagogy. In: St Petersburg Conservatory in the world musical space: composer, performing, scientific schools, 1862–2012 / ed.-comp.: N. I. Degtyareva, N. A. Braginskaya; SPbGK. St Petersburg : Publishing house of Polytechnic University, 2013. P. 66–81.
- Genrikh Orlov: biographical sketch. In: Comparative art history : XXI century. Vol. 1: The legacy of Genrikh Orlov and current problems of modern comparative art history. Pt. 1 / ed. board: O. V. Kolganova (editor-in-chief), I. V. Matsievsky (editor-in-chief) and others. St Petersburg : Russian Institute of Art History, 2014. P. 28–50.
- On the prospects of Russian study of biographies: Letters from Shostakovich to Bogdanov-Berezovsky (1920s). In: Music in the cultural space of Europe-Russia : Events. Personality. History. St Petersburg : Russian Institute of Art History, 2014, P. 260–74.
- Benjamin Britten in the left ranks. In: Musical art in the processes of cultural exchange : (articles and materials in honor of A. I. Klimovitsky). Collection of articles / ed. and comp. G. V. Petrova. St Petersburg : Russian Institute of Art History, 2015. P. 113–25.
- Chronicle of Shostakovich, prolegomena and contexts. In: S. P. Diagilev and modern culture: materials of the International Symposium “Diagilev Readings” (Perm, May 2014) / comp. and ed. O. R. Levenkov. Perm: Book World, 2015. P. 105–14.
- [Book Review] Olesya Bobrik. Vienna “Universal Edition” and musicians from Soviet Russia: the history of cooperation in the 1920–1930s. In: Opera musicologica. 2015. No. 1. P. 76–83.
- Joseph Schillinger in materials and documents: chronology of the 1920s (Leningrad). In: Two lives of Joseph Schillinger. First life: Russia. Second life: America / author of the project, comp. A. L. Bretanitskaya; total ed. O. A. Bobrik; ed. board: I. A. Barsova, O. A. Bobrik, E. A. Dubinets, M. P. Rakhmanova. Moscow : Moscow Conservatory, 2015. P. 161–206. [co-authored with E. Ivanova]
- Many years later. In: Polubentsev A. Libretto of my life. St Petersburg, 2015. P. 30–2, 118–9.
- Genrikh Orlov. Return (to the description of the archive in the Cabinet of manuscripts). In: From the funds of the Cabinet of manuscripts of the Russian Institute of Art History : Messages. Publications. Reviews. Vol. 6 / comp. and ed. G. V. Kopytova. St Petersburg, 2016. P. 331–52.
- “Billy Budd” by Benjamin Britten. In: Benjamin Britten. Billy Budd: New Stage / The Bolshoi Theater of Russia. Moscow, 2016. P. 25–31.
- Tragedy at sea: Britten’s “Billy Budd” on the New Stage of The Bolshoi Theater. In: Muzykal’naya zhizn’. 2016. No. 12. P. 2–4.
- I. S. Bach in the life of the Druskin brothers (in collaboration with M. Mischenko). In: Schweitzer A. I. S. Bach. 4th ed. Moscow, 2016. P. 657–83.
- “His books were ahead of their time” : Essay about the musicologist Genrikh Orlov. In: Etazhi. 2017. No. 3 (7). Sept.
- Portrait of the artist as a young man: The Shostakovich–Bogdanov-Berezovsky correspondence. In: Russian Music since 1917 / ed. by Patrick Zuk and Marina Frolova-Walker. Oxford : Oxford University Press, 2017. P. 269–79.
- Benjamin Britten, 1913–1976. Sinfonia da Requiem. In: “Forgotten Land”. Ballet in one act to the music of Benjamin Britten’s Requiem Symphony: New Stage / The Bolshoi Theater of Russia. Moscow, 2017. P. 29–30.
- “Finnish Suite” by Shostakovich in the Leningrad musical context: from the manuscript history. In: Opera musicologica. 2017. No. 4 (34). P. 19–34.
- The Leningrad context of Shostakovich’s “Finnish Suite”. Report theses. In: Materials of the International Scientific Conference: St Petersburg in Dialogue with the Cultural Capitals of Europe. St Petersburg : Russian Institute of Art History, 2017. P. 30.
- Reflections of all life: articles in the scientific heritage of M. S. Druskin. In: Druskin M. S. Collected works : in 7 vols. / ed. by L. G. Kovnatskaya. Vol. 6 : Selected articles. St Petersburg : Kompozitor – St Petersburg, 2018. P. 14–22.
- Leningrad Association of Contemporary Music in the activities of the International Society of Contemporary Music (1920s). Theses of the report. In: Materials of the All-Russian scientific conference “Musical Petersburg: Creative Dialogues”. St Petersburg : Russian Institute of Art History, 2018. 50 p.
- LASM’s portrait of Julia Weisberg. In: Muzykal’naya akademiya. 2018. No. 3. P. 137–50. [in collaboration with M. Mazur]
- Forgotten name and actual works. Vladimir Davydovich Dneprov and music. In: Artikult. 2018. No. 3. P. 131–8.
- “LASM Archive” as a historiographical phenomenon. In: Muzykovedenie. 2018. No. 9. P. 22–7.
- “Inevitable crossing of lines”. In: Henry Purcell. Dido and Aeneas / The Bolshoi Theater of Russia. New Stage / eds.: A. Makarova, T. Belova. Moscow, 2019. P. 26–31.
- Yu. A. Kremlev in correspondence with B. Britten (based on materials from the Cabinet of manuscripts) / publ. [transl., comment.] L. G. Kovnatskaya. In: From the funds of the Cabinet of manuscripts of the Russian Institute of Art History. Articles and messages. Publications. Reviews. Vol. 7 / ed. by G. V. Kopytova. St Petersburg : Russian Institute of Art History, 2020. P. 259–67.
- Post scriptum. In: Hajnovskaya T. A. Four conversations with Svetlana Tairova. St Petersburg : Kompozitor – St Petersburg, 2021. P. 54–6.

== See also ==
- Women in musicology
