= Donald William Krummel =

American music bibliographer and academic (1929–2026)

- Born: July 12, 1929; Sioux City, Iowa, U.S.
- Died: June 25, 2026 (aged 96)
- Occupations: Music bibliographer, academic

Donald William Krummel (July 12, 1929 – June 25, 2026) was an American music bibliographer, academic and librarian. Essays in Honor of Donald W. Krummel was published in 1996. In 2012 he was honored by the Society for American Music with the Lifetime Achievement Award.

== Education and career ==
Krummel received the B.Mus. (1951), M.Mus. (1953), M.A.L.S. (Masters in Liberal Studies, 1954), and Ph.D. (1958) from the University of Michigan, Ann Arbor.

He was a Teaching Fellow (1952–1954) and Instructor in Music Literature (1954–1956) at the University of Michigan.

Krummel was Reference Librarian for the Music Division at the Library of Congress from 1956 to 1961.

He was Head of the Reference Department (1962–1964) and Associate Librarian from 1964 to 1969 at the Newberry Library in Chicago.

Krummel was professor at the University of Illinois at Urbana-Champaign (1970–1997) in the University of Illinois School of Information Sciences. He held National Endowment for the Humanities project awards in 1976, 1979, and 1983.

In 1988, he was the Englehard Lecturer at the Library of Congress, Center for the Book.

He served as a faculty member at the Rare Book School at Columbia University, which then moved to the University of Virginia (1990–2008).

From 1997, Krummel was professor emeritus at the University of Illinois.

== Personal life and death ==
Krummel married Marilyn Frederick (1931–2025) on June 15, 1956. They had two children, Karen and Matthew, and three grandchildren.

Krummel died on June 25, 2026, at the age of 96.

== Selected honors and awards ==
- 2017. Bibliographical Society of America Honorary Member.
- 2012. Lifetime Achievement Award from the Society for American Music
- 2004. American Printing History Association Laureate Award.
- 1999. Beta Phi Mu Award for distinguished service to education for librarianship.
- 1991. University of Illinois University Scholar
- 1989. Sonneck Society (Society of American Music), Irving Lowens Book Award.
- 1987. American Library Association G.K. Hall Award
- 1983. Vincent H. Duckles Award. Music Library Association
- 1976–1977. Guggenheim Fellow
- 1974–1975. University College (London) Honorary Research Fellow
- 1969–1970. Newberry Library Traveling Research Fellow
- 1969. Aspen Institute for Humanistic Studies Scholar in Residence
- 1965. Henry E. Huntington Library. Grant-in-Aid

== Selected publications ==
=== Books ===
- Krummel, Donald W. (1974). Guide for Dating Early Published Music: A Manual of Bibliographical Practices. International Association of Music Libraries, Commission for Bibliographical Research. Hackensack, NJ: J. Boonin. ISBN 0913574252.
- Krummel, Donald W. (1975). English Music Printing, 1553-1700. Bibliographical Society Publication. London: Bibliographical Society. ISBN 0197217885.
- Krummel, Donald W. (1977). Bibliographical Inventory to the Early Music in the Newberry Library, Chicago, Illinois. Boston: G.K. Hall. ISBN 081610042X.
- Krummel, Donald W. (1981). Resources of American Music History: A Directory of Source Materials from Colonial Times to World War II. Urbana, IL: University of Illinois Press. ISBN 0252008286.
- Krummel, Donald W. (1984). Bibliographies: Their Aims and Methods. London and New York: Mansell. ISBN 9780720116878.
- Krummel, Donald W. (1988). The Memory of Sound: Observations on the History of Music on Paper. Center for the Book Viewpoint Series, no. 20. Washington, DC: Library of Congress. Presented at the Library of Congress, Center for the Book.
- Krummel, Donald W. (1987). Bibliographical Handbook of American Music. Urbana, IL: University of Illinois Press. ISBN 0252014502.
- Krummel, Donald W.; Sadie, Stanley, eds. (1990). Music Printing and Publishing. Norton/Grove Handbooks in Music. New York: W.W. Norton. ISBN 0393028097.
- Krummel, Donald W. (1992). The Literature of Music Bibliography : An Account of the Writings on the History of Music Printing & Publishing. Berekely, CA: Fallen Leaf Press. ISBN 9780914913214.
- Krummel, Donald W. (1999). Fiat lux, Fiat Latebra: A Celebration of Historical Library Functions. Occasional Papers. Urbana, IL: Graduate School of Library and Information Science, University of Illinois.

=== Articles ===
- Krummel, Donald W. (1960). "Current National Bibliographies: Their Music Coverage". Notes. 17. Music Library Association: 375–88.
- Krummel, Donald W. (1966). "Observations on Library Acquisitions of Music". Notes. 23. Music Library Association: 5–16.
- Krummel, Donald W. (1971). "Oblong Format in Early Music Books". The Library. s5-XXVI. Londond: The Bibliographical Society: 312–324. doi:10.1093/library/s5-XXVI.4.31.
- Krummel, Donald W. (1971). "Guide for Dating Early Music: A Synopsis". Fontes Artis Musicae. 18. International Association of Music Libraries: 40–59. JSTOR 23505188.
- Krummel, Donald W. (1976). "Musical Functions and Bibliographical Forms". The Library. 5th series. 31 (4): 327–350. doi:10.1093/library/s5-XXXI.4.327.
- Krummel, Donald W. (1987). "Citing the Score: Descriptive Bibliography and Printed Music". The Library. 6. 9 (4): 329–346. doi:10.1093/library/s6-9.4.329.
- Krummel, Donald W. (1989). "Guides to National Bibliographies: A Review Essay". Libraries & Culture. 24 (2): 217–230. ISSN 0894-8631. JSTOR 25542141.
- Krummel, Donald W. (2000). "The Petrucci Centenary". Gazette of the Grolier Club. New Series. 51: 99–111.
- Krummel, Donald W. (2004). "Notes: A Sixtieth Birthday Retrospective". Notes: Quarterly Journal of the Music Library Association. 61: 9–23. doi:10.1353/not.2004.0104.
- Krummel, Donald W. (2005). "Early American Imprint Bibliography and Its Stories: An Introductory Course in Bibliographical Civics". Libraries & Culture. 40 (3): 239–50. JSTOR 25541929.
