= Journal of the Society for American Music =

- Discipline: Music
- Language: English
- Edited by: Marian Wilson Kimber

Publication details
- Former name: American Music
- History: 1983–present
- Publisher: Cambridge University Press on behalf of the Society for American Music

Standard abbreviations
- ISO 4: J. Soc. Am. Music

Indexing
- ISSN: 1752-1963 (print); 1752-1971 (web)
- LCCN: 2007219399
- OCLC no.: 472936948
- American Music
- ISSN: 0734-4392

Links
- Journal homepage; Online access; Online archive

The Journal of the Society for American Music, published quarterly, is a peer-reviewed academic journal and the official journal of the Society for American Music. It is published by Cambridge University Press and currently edited by Marian Wilson Kimber at the University of Iowa. The journal replaced American Music, which was first published Spring 1983 (Vol. 1, No. 1), as the official journal of the Society in spring 2007.

== Selected people ==
- Allen Perdue Britton (1914–2003), founding editor
- Irving Lowens (1916–1983), founding book review editor
- Don L. Roberts, founding record review editor and discographer; he was Head of the Music Library at Northwestern University from 1969 to 2002
- Richard Jackson, founding bibliographer
