= Josephine Wright =

American musicologist (b. 1942)

- Born: September 5, 1942 (age 84); Detroit, Michigan

Academic work
- Discipline: Musicology
- Institutions: Harvard University, College of Wooster, Ohio

Josephine Rosa Beatrice Wright (born September 5, 1942) is an American musicologist, recognized for her contributions to the study of African-American music and women in music. From 1981 to 2021, she was professor of music and the Josephine Lincoln Morris Professor of Black Studies at the College of Wooster in Ohio. In 2015, she was presented the Society for American Music's Lifetime Achievement Award.

== Biography ==
Wright was born in Detroit, Michigan, in 1942. She earned a bachelor's degree in music from the University of Missouri, a master's degree in music from Pius XII Academy in Florence, a master's degree in music from the University of Missouri, and a doctoral degree in historical musicology from New York University. She was the second African American to earn a doctorate in music, after Eileen Southern, her mentor and collaborator.

Wright served as an assistant professor at Harvard University's Department of Afro-American studies from 1976 to 1981. In 1981, she filed a suit against Harvard with the Equal Employment Opportunity Commission, accusing the institution of race and gender discrimination. That year, she joined the faculty at the College of Wooster, where she was named a professor of music and Josephine Lincoln Morris Professor of Black Studies. She continued teaching at Wooster until her retirement in 2021, whereupon she was granted Emerita Status.

Wright is recognized as an expert in African-American music, women in music, black women's history, and Western music history. With Eileen Southern, she co-authored African-American Traditions in Song, Sermon, Tale, and Dance, 1600s-1920 (1990) and Images: Iconography of Music in African-American Culture, 1770s-1920s (2000). Wright served as editor of American Music from 1994 to 1997. In 1997, she was named to the national artistic directorate of the American Classical Music Hall of Fame and Museum in Cincinnati.

In 2015, the Society for American Music presented Wright with a Lifetime Achievement Award. In 2019, she was elected an honorary member of the American Musicological Society "as a pioneer in the study and teaching of women's and African-Americans' participation in musical life."

== Selected works ==
=== Books ===
- Southern, Eileen; Wright, Josephine (1990). African-American Traditions in Song, Sermon, Tale, and Dance, 1600s-1920: An Annotated Bibliography of Literature, Collections, and Artworks. New York: Greenwood Press. ISBN 0-313-24918-0. OCLC 21330532.
- Southern, Eileen; Wright, Josephine (2000). Images: Iconography of Music in African-American culture (1770s-1920s). New York: Garland Pub. ISBN 0-8153-2875-3. OCLC 43694336.

=== Book chapters ===
- Wright, Josephine (1986). "Early African musicians in Britain". In Lotz, Rainer E.; Pegg, Ian (eds.). Under the Imperial Carpet: Essays in Black history, 1780-1950. Crawley, UK: Rabbit Press. pp. 14–24. ISBN 0-948775-01-7. OCLC 18662181.
- Wright, Josephine (2000). "Coming of age: Reflections on black music scholarship". In Heintze, J.R.; Saffle, M. (eds.). Reflections on American Music: The Twentieth Century and the New Millennium. Sheffield, MA: Pendragon Press. pp. 391–6.
- Wright, Josephine R. B. (2014). "Art/classical music". In Burnim, Mellonee V.; Maultsby, Portia K. (eds.). African American Music: An Introduction (Second ed.). New York: Routledge. pp. 154–176. ISBN 978-0-415-88181-4. OCLC 989370939.

=== Journal articles ===
- Wright, Josephine R. B. (1980). "George Polgreen Bridgetower: An African prodigy in England 1789–99". The Musical Quarterly. 66 (1): 65–82. doi:10.1093/mq/lxvi.1.65. ISSN 0027-4631.
- Wright, Josephine (1990). "Violinist Jose White in Paris, 1855-1875". Black Music Research Journal. 10 (2): 213–232. doi:10.2307/779386. ISSN 0276-3605. JSTOR 779386.
- Wright, Josephine (1990). "A preliminary bibliographical guide to periodical literature for black music research". Black Music Research Journal. 10 (1): 14–17. doi:10.2307/779525. JSTOR 779525.
- Wright, Josephine (2006). "Songs of remembrance". The Journal of African American History. 91 (4): 413–424. doi:10.1086/JAAHv91n4p413. ISSN 1548-1867. S2CID 140464352.
