= Bill C. Malone =

American musician and historian (born 1934)

- Born: August 25, 1934 (age 92); Texas, US
- Awards: Lifetime Achievement Award from the Society for American Music

Academic background
- Education: University of Texas

Academic work
- Discipline: History
- Institutions: Tulane University
- Main interests: Country Music
- Notable works: Country Music, U.S.A.

Bill C. Malone (born August 25, 1934) is an American musician, author and historian specializing in country music and other forms of traditional American music. He is the author of the 1968 book Country Music, U.S.A., the first definitive academic history of country music. The third revised edition appeared in 2010. Malone is Professor Emeritus of History at Tulane University and now resides in San Antonio, TX.

== Biography ==
Malone was born on a cotton-growing tenant farm 20 miles west of Tyler, Texas in 1934 and grew up with music as "a constant companion". After studying at community college, he enrolled in the University of Texas in 1956 and became a well-known singer in the Austin area, due in part to his encyclopedic repertoire of "hillbilly" songs he learned growing up. He performed at Threadgill's beer joint in Austin and completed his Master's degree. He was pleased when his faculty advisor suggested he write his doctoral dissertation on something he loved: "hillbilly", i.e., country, music. His 1965 dissertation was published in 1968 as Country Music, U.S.A.

Malone hosts a weekly radio show, Back to the Country, on WORT–FM community radio in Madison, Wisconsin, and performs country music with his wife, Bobbie Malone, playing mandolin and guitar.

== Honours ==
Malone was awarded a Guggenheim Fellowship in 1984 to assist his research in U.S. history. In 2008, he received a Lifetime Achievement Award from the Society for American Music.

== Selected publications ==
- An early history of Austin, Texas, 1839-1861 (1958) University of Texas, pp. 272, googlebooks
- Country Music, U.S.A. (1968; revised edition 1984; 2nd revised, annotated edition 2002; 3rd revised, annotated edition 2010 with Jocelyn R. Neal) University of Texas Press, pp. 664, ISBN 978-0292723290
- Southern Music/American Music (co-author with David Stricklin) (1979; 2nd, illustrated, revised edition 2003) University Press of Kentucky, pp. 236, ISBN 0-8131-9055-X
- Singing Cowboys and Musical Mountaineers: Southern Culture and the Roots of Country Music (1993) University of Georgia Press, pp. 168, ISBN 0-8203-2551-1
- Bill C. Malone (2001). Don't Get Above Your Raisin': Country Music and the Southern Working Class. University of Illinois Press. ISBN 0-252-02678-0.
- Working Girl Blues: The Life and Music of Hazel Dickens (co-author with Hazel Dickens) (2008) University of Illinois Press, pp. 102, ISBN 0-252-07549-8
- Music from the True Vine: Mike Seeger's Life and Musical Journey (2011) UNC Press Books, pp. 240, ISBN 0-8078-3510-2
