= Charles Hamm =

American musicologist

Charles Edward Hamm
- Born: April 21, 1925; Charlottesville, Virginia
- Died: October 16, 2011 (aged 86); Lebanon, New Hampshire
- Occupation: Musicologist

Academic background
- Education: University of Virginia

Charles Edward Hamm (April 21, 1925 – October 16, 2011) was an American musicologist, writer, composer, and music educator. He is credited with being the first music historian to seriously study and write about American popular music. He also was one of the founders of the International Association for the Study of Popular Music (IASPM).

Born in Charlottesville, Virginia, Hamm graduated from the University of Virginia in 1947 where he was a member of the Virginia Glee Club. Zachary Woolfe wrote in The New York Times that "Mr. Hamm was one of the first scholars to study the history of American popular music with musicological rigor and sensitivity to complex racial and ethnic dynamics, and both oral and written traditions. He traced pop’s history not just to its full recent flowering in the 1950s or to the 19th century and Stephen Foster, but also to the colonial-era compositions that created the context for all that followed."

Hamm was a 1967 Guggenheim Fellowship recipient. In 2002 he was awarded a Lifetime Achievement Award by the Society for American Music.

He died of pneumonia, leaving three sons.

== Works ==
- Yesterdays: Popular Song in America (1979)
- Music in the New World (1983)
- Putting Popular Music in its Place (1995)
- Irving Berlin: Songs From the Melting Pot (1997)
- Graceland Revisited
