= Anahit Tsitsikian =

Armenian violinist (1926–1999)

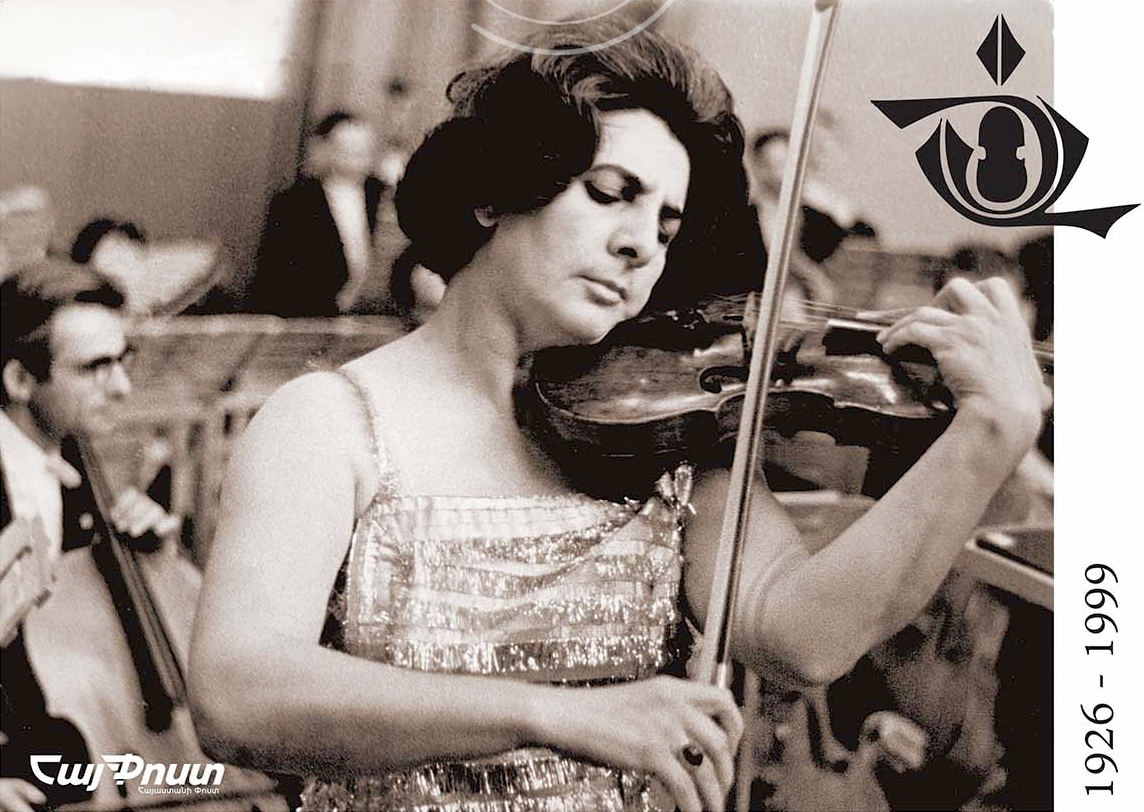

Background information
- Born: 26 August 1926; Leningrad, USSR
- Died: 2 May 1999 (aged 72)
- Genres: Classical
- Occupations: Violinist, musicologist, teacher
- Instrument: Violin
- Website: https://www.violin.am

Anahit Tsitsikian (Armenian: Անահիտ Ցիցիկյան; August 26, 1926 – May 2, 1999) was an Armenian violinist. She toured around the world through more than 100 cities during the Soviet times; she taught at the State Conservatory for approximately 40 years and wrote more than 300 articles and scenarios for television and radio programs. She was also a scholar who established a new branch of Armenian musicology, history of performing art, and dedicated the last twenty years of her life to research in the field of ancient music history, becoming the founder of a new branch of Armenian musical archaeology.

Tsitsikian was Merited Artist of Armenia or People's Artist of the Armenian SSR (1967), PhD of Musical Science (1970) and Professor of Music (1982).

== Biography ==
Anahit Tsitsikian was born in Leningrad (currently St. Petersburg), Russia, into a family of an engineer and a doctor. She began playing the violin at the age of six. Her teachers were musician Grigory Ginzburg and later on professor Lev Tseitlin). At the beginning of World War II, at the age of fifteen, she left Leningrad for Armenia. Her birthplace left an unforgettable mark on her development as a person and musician.

She studied at the Yerevan State Conservatory from 1946 to 1950 as a student of Professor Karp Dombayev. She was granted the Stalin Scholarship. In 1954 she completed her graduate course at the Moscow State Conservatory (adviser – Professor Konstantin Mostras).

She began performing professionally at elementary school age; her performances included many solo performances as well as with symphonic orchestras. Beginning in 1961 she was the principal soloist at the Armenian Philharmonic Hall. Tsitsikian performed throughout the Republics of the former Soviet Union and in 27 countries around the world. As a violinist she produced four vinyl discs under the Melodiya label. The music of modern Armenian composers held a special place in Ms. Tsitsikian’s repertoire. She was often the co-author, editor and first interpreter of their original pieces.

She taught at the Yerevan State Conservatory starting in 1950, and she established three new courses in its curriculum: history and theory of bowed instruments, history of Armenian performing arts, and course of music teaching practice.

Tsitsikian started her scholarly research while she was still a student of the Conservatory. Her research focused on bowing art, organology and musical archaeology, of which she was the founder in Armenia. She spoke five languages, and lectured in English, French, and German. She participated in numerous international scientific conferences and she also published he articles in Armenia and abroad.

During her artistic life, Tsitsikian performed in more than a thousand recitals, recorded sixty pieces of archived music, and authored more than 300 articles and scripts for many radio and television programs. She was a member of many local and international organizations such as: Composer’s Union of Armenia or Union of Soviet Composers, Armenian Theater Union, Journalists Union, Women’s Committee of the USSR, AOKS (cultural liaison committee of Armenia with foreign countries), "History of World Culture" Committee in the Academy of Sciences of the Soviet Union, The World Scientific Association of Historical Archaeology, etc.

Anahit Tsitsikian died on May 2, 1999. The Anahit Cultural Foundation was established in the same year to continue her work and fulfill her dreams. The mission of the foundation is to facilitate the promotion of Armenian music by supporting musicians in their professional education and work, setting up and implementing cultural programs and events, and stimulating the integration of Armenian music within international music.

== Honours and awards ==
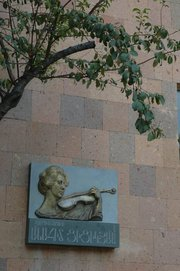
Tsitsikian plaque

Anahit Tsitsikian was an Emeritus Artist of Armenia (1967), PhD of Musical Science (1970), and Professor of Music (1982). In 2007 a music school was named after her in Yerevan, Armenia.

== See also ==
- Women in musicology
