= Lawrence Carter (historian) =

American historian

Lawrence Edward Carter, Sr. is an American historian, professor, author, and civil rights expert. He is Professor of Religion, College Archivist and Curator at Morehouse College as well as the Dean of the Martin Luther King Jr. International Chapel at Morehouse. Carter is also the founder of the Martin Luther King Jr. Chapel Assistants Pre-seminarians Program, and director of the Martin Luther King Jr. College of Pastoral Leadership.

== Early life and education ==
Carter was born in Dawson, Georgia to John and Bernice Carter. He grew up in Columbus, Ohio and graduated from West High School. He received his B.A. in Social Science and Psychology from Virginia University of Lynchburg, and subsequently a M. Div., S.T.M., and Ph.D. degrees from Boston University.

== Career ==
After graduating from Boston University, Carter served as Associate Dean of Daniel L. Marsh Chapel at Boston University. Carter later taught at Harvard University Divinity School and served as coordinator of African American studies at Simmons College.

At Morehouse College, Carter founded the Martin Luther King Jr. Chapel Assistants Pre-seminarians Program. He commissioned the Gandhi, King, Ikeda Institute for Ethics and Reconciliation in 1999, and created the Gandhi-King-Ikeda Community Builder’s Prize of the Morehouse Chapel in 2001. He also founded Morehouse College's International Hall of Honor and solicited a gift from the National Baptist Convention of $100,000 to erect the only statue in the state of Georgia of Martin Luther King Jr. He is currently Dean of the Martin Luther King Jr. International Chapter at Morehouse.

In 2021 Dr. Carter received a Boston University 2021 Distinguished Alumni Award.

== Personal life ==
Carter is married to Marva Griffin Carter, Associate Professor of Music History, Popular Music, and World Music at Georgia State University. They have one son, Lawrence Edward Carter Jr.

== Awards and honors ==
Carter has received four honorary degrees from the following three schools: Lincoln University, Al al-Bayt University, and Soka University of Japan. He has received the following awards:

- Seikyo Award for Highest Honor
- Trumpet Award for Spirituality.
- National Endowment for the Humanities Fellow (x2)
- Fulbright-Hayes Scholar

== Select works ==
- Centennial Festschrift, honoring Benjamin Elijah Mays
- Walking Integrity: Benjamin Elijah Mays as Mentor to Martin Luther King, Jr.
- Global Ethical Options, in the Tradition of Mahatma Gandhi, Martin Luther King, Jr., and Daisaku Ikeda (2001)
- Being Peace, The Thing Itself- In the Tradition of Gandhi, King and Ikeda
- The Baptist Preacher's Buddhist Teacher: How My Interfaith Journey With Daisaku Ikeda Made Me A Better Christian

== See also ==
- List of civil rights leaders
- List of peace activists
- Post–civil rights era in African-American history
