= Margaret Hillis =

American conductor (1921–1998)

- Margaret Hillis in 1979
- Born: October 1, 1921; Kokomo, Indiana, U.S.
- Died: February 5, 1998 (aged 76); Evanston, Illinois, U.S.
- Education: Indiana University School of Music; Juilliard
- Occupations: Orchestral conductor, choral conductor, educator
- Relatives: Elwood "Bud" Hillis, brother

Margaret Eleanor Hillis (October 1, 1921, Kokomo, Indiana – February 5, 1998, Evanston, Illinois) was an American conductor. She was the founder and first director of the Chicago Symphony Chorus.

== Life ==
Hillis was born in Kokomo, Indiana, in 1921. She began to study the piano at the age of five and continued with several other instruments, including woodwinds, brass, and double bass. She made her conducting debut, while still a student, as assistant conductor of her high school orchestra at the Tudor Hall School (now Park Tudor School) in Indianapolis, IN.

After suspending her studies for two years during World War II to become a civilian flight instructor in Muncie, Indiana, Hillis received a bachelor of music degree in composition from Indiana University School of Music in 1947 and later studied conducting privately with Julius Herford and with Robert Shaw at the Juilliard School. She later became assistant conductor of Shaw's Collegiate Chorale.

In 1950, Hillis founded the Tanglewood Alumni Chorus, which later performed as the New York Concert Choir and Orchestra. She also worked as a choral conductor for the New York City Opera and the American Opera Society. During her years in New York she taught choral conducting at the Juilliard School and Union Theological Seminary. From 1970 to 1977 she was Director of Choral Activities at Northwestern University in Evanston, Illinois. Among her pupils was Robert Evett.

Hillis was also founder and music director of the American Choral Foundation (now Chorus America), an organization that sought to raise the standards of choral performance.

In 1992, Hillis conducted the Interlochen Arts Academy Orchestra and Choir as part of the Mozart Bicentennial Celebration in Alice Tully Hall in Lincoln Center, New York.

From 1968 through to the time of her death in 1998, she lived at 929 Sheridan Road in Wilmette, Illinois. At her home, she would from time to time conduct small group practices and hold informal ensemble performances in her spacious living room for friends and acquaintances.

Prior to her death, Hillis bequeathed her personal collection of scores, books, and other memorabilia to the Chicago Symphony Orchestra's Rosenthal Archives. Included are multiple sound recordings as well as scores and parts bearing her personal markings and analyses, Grammy Awards and other certificates and mementos, photographs, and personal papers and correspondence.

Margaret Hillis was an older sister to Elwood "Bud" Hillis, who served as Representative to the United States Congress from Kokomo, Indiana for eight terms (1971–1987).

== Chicago Symphony Orchestra and Chorus ==
On September 22, 1957, the Chicago Symphony Orchestra announced that Margaret Hillis, at Music Director Fritz Reiner's invitation, would organize and train a symphony chorus. Auditions began two weeks later, and on March 13 and 14, 1958, the Chicago Symphony Chorus made its subscription concert debut performing Mozart's Requiem with Bruno Walter conducting. A few weeks later, Reiner himself led the Chorus for the first time in performances of Verdi's Requiem.

Hillis was also the first woman to conduct the Chicago Symphony Orchestra, first on a special concert in November 1957 and later on subscription concerts in December 1958, leading the orchestra and chorus in Honegger's Christmas Cantata. Hillis captured nationwide attention on October 31, 1977, when she substituted on short notice for the ailing Sir Georg Solti, conducting the Chicago Symphony Orchestra and Chorus in a performance of Gustav Mahler's Symphony No. 8 in New York's Carnegie Hall.

Under her leadership, the Chicago Symphony Chorus performed and recorded a number of the major choral symphonic works, which were considered milestones in the CSO's history. Hillis won nine Grammy Awards from the National Academy of Recording Arts and Sciences for best choral performance.

She also worked with community and regional orchestras, and was director for several years of the Kenosha Civic and the Elgin Symphony Orchestras. Hillis regularly conducted the Civic Orchestra of Chicago, the training orchestra of the Chicago Symphony Orchestra. Starting in the late 1970s, she worked actively as a guest conductor, leading performances of the National, San Francisco, Indianapolis, Milwaukee, Saint Paul, Baltimore, Minnesota, Columbus, Peoria, San Antonio, Spokane, and Oregon symphony orchestras; the New York Choral Society; the Los Angeles Master Chorale; the Gloria Dei Cantores; and the Santa Fe Opera.

== Honors and awards ==
Grammy Award for Best Choral Performance

- 1977 – Sir Georg Solti: VERDI Requiem
- 1978 – Sir Georg Solti: BEETHOVEN Missa solemnis
- 1979 – Sir Georg Solti: BRAHMS A German Requiem
- 1982 – Sir Georg Solti: BERLIOZ The Damnation of Faust
- 1983 – Sir Georg Solti: HAYDN The Creation
- 1984 – James Levine: BRAHMS A German Requiem
- 1986 – James Levine: ORFF Carmina Burana
- 1991 – Sir Georg Solti: BACH Mass in B minor, BWV 232
- 1993 – Pierre Boulez: BARTÓK Cantata profana
