= Richard Crawford (music historian) =

American music historian (1935–2024)

Richard Arthur Crawford (May 12, 1935 – July 23, 2024) was an American music historian and professor of music at the University of Michigan. His American Musical Landscape was one of the seminal works of American music history, published in 2001. He published several other books, and edited a series of books on American music. He was an honorary member and president of the American Musicological Society, one of the founding members of the Society for American Music, and was the founder and editor-in-chief of MUSA (Music of the United States of America). He was born in Detroit.

Crawford died from congestive heart failure in Ann Arbor, on July 23, 2024, at the age of 89.
