= Society for American Music =

Scholarly and educational organization

The Society for American Music (SAM) was founded in 1975 and was first named the Sonneck Society in honor of Oscar George Theodore Sonneck, early Chief of the Music Division in the Library of Congress and pioneer scholar of American music. The Society for American Music is a non-profit scholarly and educational organization incorporated in the District of Columbia as a 501 (c) (3) and is a constituent member of the American Council of Learned Societies. It is based at the Stephen Foster Memorial on the campus of the University of Pittsburgh in Pittsburgh, Pennsylvania.

== About ==
The mission of the Society for American Music is to stimulate the appreciation, performance, creation, and study of American music in all its diversity. "America" is understood to embrace both American, including North, Central, and South America and the Caribbean, as well as aspects of these cultures everywhere in the world.

The Society holds an annual conference, usually in March, featuring scholarly talks, exhibits, and performances.

== Publications ==
In 2007, the Society began publishing its own journal, the Journal of the Society for American Music (JSAM). From 1983 through 2006, the Society had published the journal American Music in collaboration with the University of Illinois Press.

== Lifetime Achievement Award ==
The Lifetime Achievement Award is presented by the Society "in recognition of the recipient's significant and substantial lifetime achievement in scholarship, performance, teaching, and/or support of American Music."

Award recipients are:

Year	Recipient
2025	Charles H. Garrett
2024	J. Peter Burkholder, Carol Hess, and Guy Ramsey
2023	George Boziwick and Howard Pollack
2022	Carol Oja
2021	Cynthia Adams Hoover
2020	Marva Griffin Carter
2019	John Graziano
2019	Raoul Camus
2018	Deane Root
2017	Randy Weston
2016	Dale Cockrell
2015	Josephine Wright
2014	Pete Seeger
2013	Judith Tick
2012	Donald William Krummel
2011	Paul E. Bierley and Kate Van Winkle Keller
2010	Wayne Shirley
2009	Horace Clarence Boyer
2008	Bill C. Malone
2007	Vivian Perlis
2006	Samuel A. Floyd, Jr.
2005	Dena Epstein
2004	Adrienne Fried Block
2003	H. Wiley Hitchcock
2002	Charles Hamm
2001	Richard Crawford
2000	Billy Taylor and Eileen Southern
1999	Robert Stevenson
