= Irving Lowens =

American musicologist, critic

Irving Lowens (19 August 1916 – 14 November 1983) was an American musicologist, critic, and librarian in the Washington, D.C. area. He served as the chief music critic at the Washington Star newspaper, the Assistant Head of the music division of the Library of Congress, and the dean of the Peabody Institute in Baltimore, Maryland. Lowens was president of the Music Library Association, executive board member of the American Musicological Society, and founder of the Music Critics Association of North America and the Sonneck Society, later renamed the Society for American Music. Lowens was instrumental in improving working conditions for American critics as well as increasing standards of criticism. His main interests and scholarly works concerned American tunebooks, of which he held a significant collection. This collection contains some 2,000 volumes including American hymnals and psalm books from the 18th and 19th centuries. The collection now resides at the Moravian Music Foundation in Winston-Salem, NC. While neither Moravian in content nor in origin, the Lowens Collection is an extremely valuable resource for hymnological study, both in music and texts.

== Early life ==
Irving Lowens was born in New York City. He studied music education, music criticism, and composition at the City College of New York and Teachers College, Columbia University, graduating from the latter institution in 1939. In 1957, Lowens earned an M.A. in American Studies from the University of Maryland, College Park.

== Career ==
Lowens served as an air traffic controller in the Civil Aeronautics Administration during World War II, continuing in the position until the 1950s.

His musicological career began in 1953, when he began to write music criticism for the Washington Star. He also provided editorial assistance to publishers such as G. Schirmer. In 1959, Lowens became the Sound Recordings Reference Librarian at the Library of Congress; he was promoted to the Library's Assistant Head of the Music Division in 1961. In 1966, Lowens left the Library of Congress in order to devote himself full-time to the Washington Star, where he had been appointed Chief Music Critic in 1960; he remained in this position until 1978.

Lowens taught at Dunbarton College, the University of Southern California, the Berkshire Music Center, the Aspen School of Music, the University of Maryland and Brooklyn College. He was appointed to the faculty of the Peabody Conservatory in Baltimore in 1977 and became its dean in 1978; he retired in 1981 with emeritus status. Lowens amassed a large collection of American tunebooks that are now found in the Irving Lowens Collection at the Moravian Music Foundation in Winston-Salem, North Carolina

== Personal life ==
Lowens was married to music librarian Violet Halper until their divorce in 1967. He married musicologist and Unitarian minister Margery Morgan. He had no children.

== Memorials ==
The Society for American Music honors the musicologist through the Irving Lowens Awards, presented every year to the authors of the best book and the best article on American Music. The reading room at the Special Collections in Performing Arts at the University of Maryland is named after Irving Lowens and his wife, the musicologist Margery Morgan Lowens; their personal papers collections are held at that archives.

== Publications ==
Irving Lowens's research on early American music resulted in several important publications, including some in collaboration with Allen Britton and Richard Crawford. These include:

- "The Origins of the American Fuging Tune," JAMS, vi (1952): 43–52
- Music and Musicians in Early America (New York, 1964) [a compilation of several earlier articles]
- Lectures on the History and Art of Music (New York, 1968)
- A Bibliography of Songsters Printed in America before 1821 (Worcester, MA, 1976)
- "Das Schrift tum zur amerikanischen Musikgeschichte zwischen den Weltkriegen (1918-41)," ÖMz, xxxi (1976), heft 10, pp. 510–16
- Haydn in America (Detroit, 1979)
- Music in America and American Music: Two Views of the Scene (Brooklyn, NY, 1978)
- (with A.P. Britton and R. Crawford:) American Sacred Music Imprints, 1698-1810: a Bibliography (Worcester, MA, 1990)
