= Matthew Krummel =

Pathology professor

Matthew F. Krummel
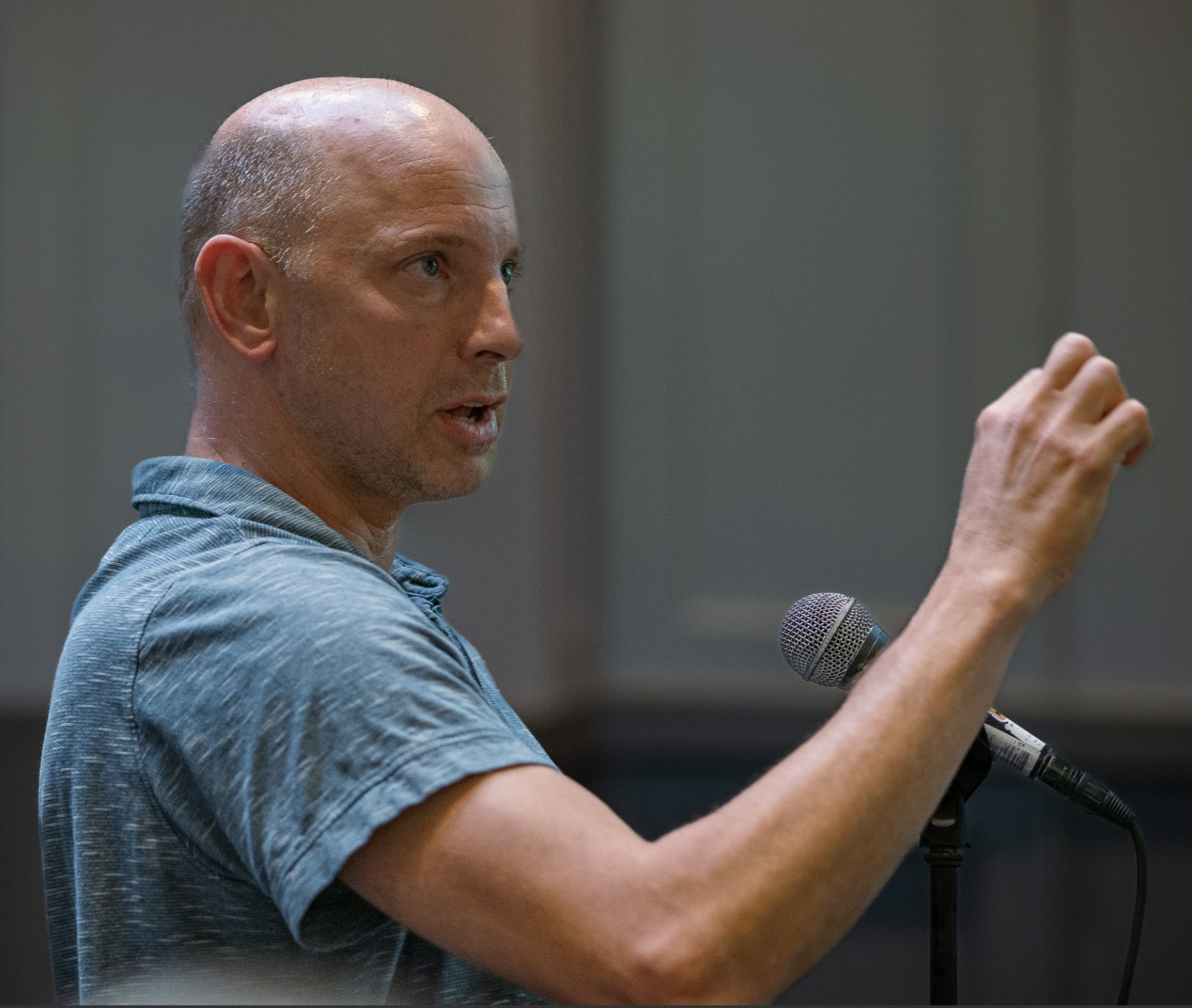
- Born: Matthew Frederick Krummel; May 28, 1968
- Education: University of Illinois at Urbana-Champaign College of Liberal Arts & Sciences (B.S.); University of California, Berkeley, (PhD); Stanford University, (Postdoctorate)
- Known for: Systems Immunology
- Scientific career
- Fields: Immunology, Pathology
- Institutions: University of California, San Francisco
- Thesis: Identification and Characterization of a CTLA-4 Dependent Regulatory Mechanism for T Cell Activation. (1995)
- Doctoral advisor: James P. Allison

Matthew F. Krummel (Max Krummel) is a Professor in the Pathology Department at University of California, San Francisco. He is known for systems immunology and studies mechanisms that regulate the immune system.

== Career ==
Krummel holds the Robert E. Smith Endowed Chair in Pathology and is the co-founder and inaugural Chair of the UCSF ImmunoX Initiative. His lab (krummellab.org) uses real-time imaging and high-dimensional cytometry and sequencing to launch and test hypotheses related to how the immune system processes information and makes decisions. His recent discoveries include determining features of T cell membrane biology and how the movement of immune cells governs their ability to efficiently survey for antigens. Additionally, his research has revealed archetypal collections of immune systems in cancer, namely those involving networks of cells built around stimulatory dendritic cells.

Krummel developed a novel industry consortium-funded project (immunoprofiler.org) that unites studies of cancer indications to understand the biology of individual patients and founded a microscopy ‘collaboratory’ at UCSF. He also founded the ImmunoX initiative, together with other UCSF faculty, which is a radical collaboration platform focused on methods and data sharing as a means to accelerate discovery and cures.

Krummel founded Pionyr Immunotherapeutics where he discovered new next-generation immunotherapeutics targeting myeloid cells.He co-founded Foundery Innovations, a novel biotechnology venture fund and studio that translates early-stage drug concepts through extensive academic-industry collaborations, most recently with the University of California, San Francisco, and the University of Arizona. In the lab of James P. Allison at UC Berkeley, Krummel conducted key studies on the function of the protein CTLA-4; together they developed and described the first CTLA-4 inhibitors. They subsequently collaborated to apply the same inhibitors in tumor models, providing data on the blockade of inhibitory receptors can augment tumor immune responses, the basis for the 2018 Nobel Prize in Medicine and Physiology as well as the first patents for anti-CTLA-4 checkpoint blockade.

Krummel received his Ph.D. at the University of California, Berkeley, and completed his postdoctoral studies at Stanford University.

== Honors ==
- 2020 Dial Fellow, Emerson Collective.
- 2009 Fellow of the American Asthma Foundation.
- 2005 Leukemia and Lymphoma Foundation, Career Award.
- 2004 Cancer Research Institute, Investigator Award.

== Positions and employment ==
- 2021 – Present Co-Founder and Managing Member, Foundery Innovations.
- 2015 – May 2021 Founder and Founding Chief Executive Officer, Pionyr Immunotherapeutics.
- 2018 – Present Co-Founder and Inaugural Chair, ImmunoX Initiative, University of California at San Francisco.
- 2012 – Present Professor, Department of Pathology, University of California at San Francisco.
- 2006 – 2021 Faculty Director, Biological Imaging Development Center, University of California at San Francisco

== Selected publications ==
- Krummel, MF; Allison, JP (1995). "CD28 and CTLA-4 have opposing effects on the response of T cells to stimulation". J. Exp. Med. 182: 459–65. PMC 2192127. PMID 7543139..
- Leach, DR; Krummel, MF; Allison, JP (1996). "Enhancement of antitumor immunity by CTLA-4 blockade". Science. 271: 1734–6. PMID 8596936..
- Binnewies, M; Roberts, EW; Kersten, K; Chan, V; Fearon, DF; Merad, M; Coussens, LM; Gabrilovich, DI; Ostrand-Rosenberg, S; Hedrick, CC; Vonderheide, RH; Pittet, MJ; Jain, RK; Zou, W; Howcroft, TK; Woodhouse, EC; Weinberg, RA; Krummel, MF (2018). "Understanding the tumor immune microenvironment (TIME) for effective therapy". Nat Med. 24: 541–550. doi:10.1038/s41591-018-0014-x. PMC 5998822. PMID 29686425..
- Broz, ML; Binnewies, M; Boldajipour, B; Nelson, AE; Pollack, JL; Erle, DJ; Barczak, A; Rosenblum, MD; Daud, A; Barber, DL; Amigorena, S; Van'T Veer, LJ; Sperling, AI; Wolf, DM; Krummel, MF (2014). "Dissecting the tumor myeloid compartment reveals rare activating antigen-presenting cells critical for T cell immunity". Cancer Cell. 26: 638–52. doi:10.1016/j.ccell.2014.09.007. PMC 4254577. PMID 25446897..
- Barry, KC; Hsu, J; Broz, ML; Cueto, FJ; Binnewies, M; Combes, AJ; Nelson, AE; Loo, K; Kumar, R; Rosenblum, MD; Alvarado, MD; Wolf, DM; Bogunovic, D; Bhardwaj, N; Daud, AI; Ha, PK; Ryan, WR; Pollack, JL; Samad, B; Asthana, S; Chan, V; Krummel, MF (2018). "A natural killer-dendritic cell axis defines checkpoint therapy-responsive tumor microenvironments". Nat Med. 24: 1178–1191. doi:10.1038/s41591-018-0085-8. PMC 6475503. PMID 29942093..
