= Eileen Southern =

American musicologist and educator (1920–2002)

- Born: Eileen Stanza Jackson; February 19, 1920; Minneapolis, Minnesota, US
- Died: October 13, 2002 (aged 82); Port Charlotte, Florida, US
- Occupation: Musicologist

Eileen Jackson Southern (February 19, 1920 – October 13, 2002) was an American musicologist, researcher, author, and teacher. Southern's research focused on black American musical styles, musicians, and composers; she also published on early music.

== Early life ==
Eileen Jackson grew up around many musicians in her family; her father was a violinist; an uncle, a trumpetist; and her mother, a choir singer. According to music scholar Samuel A. Floyd, Jr., "In childhood, as she developed as a pianist, young Eileen was introduced to and became partial to the music of those she calls the 'piano composers,' including Johann Sebastian Bach, Ludwig van Beethoven, and Claude Debussy. In addition, her piano teachers, mostly white, were concerned that she wouldn't know music by black composers and introduced her to R. Nathaniel Dett's In the Bottoms, among other such compositions."

Jackson attended public schools in her hometown, Minneapolis, Minnesota, in Sioux Falls, South Dakota, and in Chicago, Illinois. She majored in commercial art at Lindblom High School in Chicago. During the same period, she won piano-performance and essay competitions, taught piano lessons, and directed musical activities at the Lincoln Community Center. She gave her first piano recital at the age of twelve and made her debut in Chicago Orchestra Hall at age eighteen, playing a Mozart concerto with the symphony orchestra of the Chicago Musical College.

She attended and received degrees from the University of Chicago (B.A., 1940, and M. A., 1941). Her relationship with Cecil Smith, her master thesis advisor, encouraged her to further develop her interest in Negro folk music. In 1942, she married Joseph Southern, a professor of business administration.

She continued her studies and received a PhD in musicology from New York University, 1961. Her doctoral dissertation on the Buxheim Organ Book was supervised by Gustave Reese. At NYU, in addition to Gustave Reese, she also studied with Curt Sachs and Martin Bernstein. She also studied piano privately at Chicago Musical College, Juilliard, and Boston University.

== Career ==
Throughout her career, Southern taught at various institutions across the United States. From 1941 to 1942, she was an instructor at Prairie View University in Texas. From 1943 to 1945 and 1949 to 1951, she was an assistant professor at Southern University in Louisiana. From 1954 to 1960, she worked as a teacher for the New York City Public School district. She returned to higher education from 1960 to 1968 as an assistant professor at Brooklyn College, CUNY, and then as an associate and full professor at York College, CUNY, from 1968 to 1975, where she established the music program.

In 1974, she became a lecturer at Harvard University. Two years later, she became the first black woman to be appointed a tenured full professor at Harvard University, where she taught until 1987. While at Harvard, she served as the chair of the department of Afro-American Studies from 1975 to 1979.

Her best-known book is the seminal history The Music of Black Americans (1971). Her other work is Biographical Dictionary of Afro-American and African Musicians (1982). She founded The Black Perspective in Music in 1973, with her husband, Prof. Joseph Southern. It was the first musicological journal on the study of black music, and she was its editor until it ceased publication in 1990.

Through her academic work, she raised the profile of Frank Johnson, a black bandleader from Philadelphia, Pennsylvania, who rose to fame at the end of the eighteenth century, beginning of the nineteenth century. He led Frank Johnson's Colored Band, and by 1818, he had taken his band as far south as Richmond, Virginia, playing dances for white southerners. Johnson had played a command performance at Buckingham Palace, where he received a silver bugle in appreciation.

Throughout her career, Southern worked with various professional societies. From 1974 to 1976, she served on the board of directors and then editorial board from 1976 to 1978 for the American Musicological Society. She was a member of the International Musicological Society, College Music Society, and Association for the Study of Negro Life and History. From 1980 to her retirement, she served on the editorial board for the Sonneck Society for American Music and as a member of the Board of Directors from 1986 to 1988.

In 1987, she retired as a professor emeritus to live in St. Albans, New York.

== Awards ==
Southern's professional achievements were much lauded in the academic and artistic communities. Southern received a National Humanities Medal in 2001 for having "helped transform the study and understanding of American music." She also received a Lifetime Achievement Award from the Society for American Music in 2000. Her portrait, by artist Stephen E. Coit was commissioned by the Harvard Foundation at Harvard University.

== Personal life ==
On August 22, 1942 Eileen Jackson married Joseph Southern, a co-founder of the journal the Black Perspective in Music. They had a daughter, April, and a son, Edward.

== Death ==
Southern died in Port Charlotte, Florida on October 13, 2002, at the age of 82.

== Selected publications ==
=== Books ===
- The Buxheim Organ Book (2 Vols.), PhD dissertation, New York University, (New York: Institute of Medieval Music, 1963). OCLC 38257123, 11709711, 641975830, 923463274
- The Music of Black Americans: A History (New York: W. W. Norton & Company, 1971)
1. 1st ed., 1971. OCLC 1106838813; ISBNs 0-3930-2156-4, 978-0-3930-2156-1, 0-3930-9899-0, 978-0-3930-9899-0
2. French ed., 1976. OCLC 26120461, 1009422604
3. Chinese ed., 1983. OCLC 122734029
4. 1992 French ed. of the 1976 ed. OCLC 885606514, 1032405470; ISBNs 2-7020-1562-X, 978-2-7020-1562-9
5. 3rd ed., English, 1997. OCLC 1113507545; ISBNs 9780393971415, 0393971414
6. 2002 Spanish ed. of the 1997 3rd ed. OCLC 46470506, 807719178; ISBNs 8-4460-1066-6, 978-8-4460-1066-1
- Readings in Black American Music. Edited by Eileen Southern. (New York: W. W. Norton & Company, 1971; rev. ed., 1983). OCLC 495545943; ISBNs 0-3939-5280-0, 978-0-3939-5280-3
- Anonymous Pieces in the MS El Escorial IV.a.24. Edited by Eileen Southern (Basel: Hänssler-Verlag, 1981).
- Biographical Dictionary of Afro-American and African Musicians. (Westport, Connecticut: Greenwood Press (1982). LCCN 81-2586; OCLC 902119012, 891419844; ISBN 0-313-21339-9 (borrowable online via Internet Archive).
- Images: Iconography of Music in African-American Culture (1770s–1920s), Josephine Rosa Beatrice Wright, PhD (born 1942) (co-author), (New York: Garland Reference Library of the Humanities, 2000; reprinted by Routledge, 2019). OCLC 1084316639

=== Articles ===
- Southern, Eileen (2001). "Freeman, (Harry) Lawrence". Grove Music Online. Oxford, England: Oxford University Press. doi:10.1093/gmo/9781561592630.article.10187. ISBN 978-1-56159-263-0. (subscription, Wikilibrary access, or UK public library membership required)
