= Auditorium (disambiguation) =

An auditorium is an area within a theatre, concert hall or other performance space where the audience is located in order to hear and watch the performance.

It may also refer to:

== Named buildings ==
- Auditorium Building (Chicago), which incorporates
  - Auditorium Theatre, owned by Roosevelt University
- Auditorium (Community of Christ), a house of worship and office building in Independence, Missouri
- Auditorium (Torrance High School), Torrance, California, listed on the National Register of Historic Places (NRHP) in Los Angeles County
- Auditorium Building (Chicago), National Historic Landmark in Chicago designed by Adler and Sullivan
- The Auditorium (Geneva, Nebraska), an NRHP-listed building
- The Auditorium, Melbourne, a theatre in Australia

== Other uses ==
- Auditorium (video game), a 2008 musical puzzle game by Philadelphia-based studio Cipher Prime
- Auditorium (composition), a 2016 composition for electronica and orchestra by Mason Bates
- "Auditorium," a song by Guided by Voices from their 1995 album Alien Lanes
- "Auditorium," a song by Mos Def ft. Slick Rick from his 2009 album The Ecstatic
- A type of acoustic guitar

== See also ==
- Auditorium Hotel (disambiguation)
- Chautauqua Auditorium (disambiguation)
- Civic Auditorium (disambiguation)
