= CSO Resound =

American record label

In April 2007, the Chicago Symphony Orchestra Association launched CSO Resound, its in-house record label. All recordings have been made live in concert in Orchestra Hall at Symphony Center, and a complete list of releases, chronological by recording date, is below.

- Dmitri Shostakovich's Symphony No. 5 in D Minor, Op. 47—Chicago Symphony Orchestra; Myung-Whun Chung, conductor. Recorded on September 21, 22, 23, and 26, 2006 (CSOR 901 803)

Mahler's Third Symphony was the first recording issued on CSO Resound in 2007.

- Gustav Mahler's Symphony No. 3 in D Minor—Chicago Symphony Orchestra; Bernard Haitink, conductor; Michelle DeYoung, mezzo-soprano; Women of the Chicago Symphony Chorus (Duain Wolfe, director); Chicago Children’s Choir (Josephine Lee, director). Recorded on October 19, 20, and 21, 2006 (CSOR 901 701)
- Traditions and Transformations: Sounds of Silk Road Chicago (Ernest Bloch's Schelomo, Byambasuren Sharav's Legend of Herlen, Lou Harrison's Pipa Concerto, and Sergei Prokofiev's Scythian Suite)—Chicago Symphony Orchestra; Miguel Harth-Bedoya and Alan Gilbert, conductors; Yo-Yo Ma, cello; Wu Man, pipa; Silk Road Ensemble. Recorded on April 12, 13, and 17, 2007 (Bloch, Sharav, and Harrison), and May 17, 18, 19, and 22, 2007 (Prokofiev) (CSOR 901 801). 2008 Grammy Award for Best Engineered Album–Classical
- Anton Bruckner's Symphony No. 7 in E Major—Chicago Symphony Orchestra; Bernard Haitink, conductor. Recorded on May 10, 11, 12, and 15, 2007 (CSOR 901 704)
- Gustav Mahler's Symphony No. 6 in A Minor—Chicago Symphony Orchestra; Bernard Haitink, conductor. Recorded on October 18, 19, 20, and 23, 2007 (CSOR 901 804)
- Francis Poulenc's Gloria and Maurice Ravel's Daphnis and Chloe—Chicago Symphony Orchestra; Bernard Haitink, conductor; Jessica Rivera, soprano; Chicago Symphony Chorus (Duain Wolfe, director). Recorded on November 8, 9, and 10, 2007 (CSOR 901 906)
- Gustav Mahler's Symphony No. 1 in D Major—Chicago Symphony Orchestra; Bernard Haitink, conductor. Recorded on May 1, 2, and 3, 2008 (CSOR 901 902)
- Dmitri Shostakovich's Symphony No. 4 in C Minor. Op. 43 and Beyond the Score: Is Music Dangerous? (DVD)—Chicago Symphony Orchestra; Bernard Haitink, conductor; Gerard McBurney, narrator; Nicholas Rudall, actor. Recorded on May 8, 9, 10, 11, and 13, 2008 (CSOR 901 814). 2008 Grammy Award for Best Orchestral Performance
- Gustav Mahler's Symphony No. 2 in C Minor (Resurrection)—Chicago Symphony Orchestra; Bernard Haitink, conductor; Miah Persson, soprano; Christianne Stotijn, mezzo-soprano; Chicago Symphony Chorus (Duain Wolfe, director). Recorded on November 20, 21, 22, and 25, 2008 (CSOR 901 914)
- Richard Strauss's Ein Heldenleben and Anton Webern's Im Sommerwind—Chicago Symphony Orchestra; Bernard Haitink, conductor. Recorded on December 4, 5, and 6, 2008 (Strauss), and April 23, 24, 25, and 28, 2009 (Webern) (CSOR 901 1002)
- Giuseppe Verdi's Messa da Requiem—Chicago Symphony Orchestra; Riccardo Muti, conductor; Barbara Frittoli, soprano; Olga Borodina, mezzo-soprano; Mario Zeffiri, tenor; Ildar Abdrazakov, bass; Chicago Symphony Chorus (Duain Wolfe, director). Recorded on January 15, 16, and 17, 2009 (CSOR 901 1006). 2010 Grammy Awards for Best Classical Album and Best Choral Performance
- Igor Stravinsky's Pulcinella, Symphony in Three Movements, and Four Studies—Chicago Symphony Orchestra; Pierre Boulez, conductor; Roxana Constatinescu, mezzo-soprano; Nicholas Phan, tenor; Kyle Ketelsen, bass-baritone. Recorded on February 26, 27, 28, and March 3, 2009 (Symphony in Three Movements and Four Studies), and March 5, 6, and 7, 2009 (Pulcinella) (CSOR 901 918)
- Hector Berlioz's Symphonie fantastique, Op. 14 and Lélio, Op. 14b—Chicago Symphony Orchestra; Riccardo Muti, conductor; Gérard Depardieu, narrator; Mario Zeffiri, tenor; Kyle Ketelsen, bass-baritone; Chicago Symphony Chorus (Duain Wolfe, director). Recorded on September 23, 24, 25, and 28, 2010 (CSOR 901 1501)
- Chicago Symphony Orchestra Brass Live (works by Bach, Gabrieli, Grainger, Prokofiev, Revueltas, and Walton)—Chicago Symphony Orchestra Brass; Dale Clevenger, Jay Friedman, Michael Mulcahy, and Mark Ridenour, conductors. Recorded on December 16, 17, and 18, 2010 (CSOR 901 1101)
- Giuseppe Verdi's Otello—Chicago Symphony Orchestra; Riccardo Muti, conductor; Aleksandrs Antonenko, tenor (Otello); Krassimira Stoyanova, soprano (Desdemona); Carlo Guelfi, baritone (Iago); Barbara di Castri, mezzo-soprano (Emilia); Juan Francisco Gatell, tenor (Cassio); Michael Spyres, tenor (Roderigo); Paolo Battaglia, bass (Montano); Eric Owens, bass-baritone (Lodovico); David Govertsen, bass (A herald); Chicago Symphony Chorus (Duain Wolfe, director); Chicago Children’s Choir (Josephine Lee, director). Recorded on April 7, 9, and 12, 2011 (CSOR 901 1301)
- Riccardo Muti Conducts Mason Bates and Anna Clyne (Anna Clyne's Night Ferry and Mason Bates's Alternative Energy)—Chicago Symphony Orchestra; Riccardo Muti, conductor; Recorded on February 2, 3, 4, and 7, 2012 (Bates), and February 9, 10, and 11, 2012 (Clyne) (CSOR 901 1401)
- Arnold Schoenberg's Kol Nidre, Op. 39 and Dmitri Shostakovich's Suite on Verses of Michelangelo Buonarroti—Chicago Symphony Orchestra; Riccardo Muti, conductor; Ildar Abdrazakov, bass; Alberto Mizrahi, narrator; Chicago Symphony Chorus (Duain Wolfe, director). Recorded on March 15, 16, and 17, 2012 (Schoenberg), and June 14, 16, and 19, 2012 (Shostakovich) (CSOR 901 1602)
- Sergei Prokofiev's Suite from Romeo and Juliet—Chicago Symphony Orchestra; Riccardo Muti, conductor. Recorded on October 3, 5, 8, and 11, 2013 (CSOR 901 1402)
- Mason Bates's Anthology of Fantastic Zoology—Chicago Symphony Orchestra; Riccardo Muti, conductor. Recorded on June 18, 19, and 20, 2015 (CSOR 901 1601)
- Anton Bruckner's Symphony No. 9 in D Minor—Chicago Symphony Orchestra; Riccardo Muti, conductor. Recorded on June 23, 25, and 26, 2016 (CSOR 901 1701)
- Riccardo Muti Conducts Italian Masterworks (Giuseppe Verdi's Overture and Gli arredi festivi from Nabucco, Patria oppressa! from Macbeth, and Overture to I vespri siciliani; Giacomo Puccini's Intermezzo from Manon Lescaut; Pietro Mascagni's Intermezzo from Cavalleria rusticana; and Arrigo Boito's Prologue to Mefistofele)—Chicago Symphony Orchestra; Riccardo Muti, conductor; Riccardo Zanellato, bass; Chicago Symphony Chorus (Duain Wolfe, director); Chicago Children's Choir (Josephine Lee, director). Recorded on June 22, 23, 24, and 25, 2017 (CSOR 901 1801)
- Dmitri Shostakovich's Symphony No. 13 in B-flat Minor, Op. 113 (Babi Yar)—Chicago Symphony Orchestra; Riccardo Muti, conductor; Alexey Tikhomirov, bass; Men of the Chicago Symphony Chorus (Duain Wolfe, director). Recorded on September 21, 22, and 25, 2018 (CSOR 901 1901) 2020 Grammy Award for Best Engineered Album, Classical.
- Pietro Mascagni's Cavalleria Rusticana—Chicago Symphony Orchestra; Riccardo Muti, conductor; Anita Rachvelishvili, mezzo-soprano (Santuzza); Piero Pretti, tenor (Turiddu); Luca Salsi, baritone (Alfio); Ronnita Miller, mezzo-soprano (Lucia); Sasha Cooke, mezzo-soprano (Lola); Chicago Symphony Chorus (Duain Wolfe, director). Recorded on February 6, 7, and 8, 2020 (CSOR 901 2201)
- Contemporary American Composers (Jessie Montgomery's Hymn for Everyone, Max Raimi's Three Lisel Mueller Settings, and Philip Glass's Symphony No. 11)—Chicago Symphony Orchestra; Riccardo Muti, conductor; Elizabeth DeShong, mezzo-soprano. Recorded on March 22, 23, and 24, 2018 (Raimi), February 17, 18, and 19, 2022 (Glass), and April 28, 30, and May 3, 2022 (Montgomery) (CSOR 901 2301) 2023 Grammy Award for Best Engineered Album, Classical.
