= List of awards and nominations received by the Chicago Symphony Orchestra =

Recordings by the Chicago Symphony Orchestra and Chorus have earned sixty-five Grammy Awards from the Recording Academy.

Riccardo Muti, former music director, has won two Grammy Awards, both with the Chicago Symphony Orchestra and Chorus, for the recording of Verdi's Messa da Requiem on the CSO Resound label.

Sir Georg Solti, former music director and music director laureate, won thirty-one Grammy Awards. For nearly forty years, he was the artist with the most awards, until Beyoncé won four statuettes at the 65th ceremony on February 5, 2023, bringing her total to thirty-two. Solti received seven awards in addition to his twenty-four awards with the Chicago Symphony Orchestra and Chorus. In addition, Sir Georg Solti and producer John Culshaw received the first NARAS Trustees’ Award in 1967 for their "efforts, ingenuity, and artistic contributions" in connection with the first complete recording of Richard Wagner's Der Ring des Nibelungen with the Vienna Philharmonic. Solti also received the academy's 1995 Lifetime Achievement Award.

Bernard Haitink, former principal conductor, won two Grammy Awards, including one with the Chicago Symphony Orchestra for the recording of Shostakovich's Fourth Symphony on the CSO Resound label.

Pierre Boulez, former conductor emeritus and principal guest conductor, won twenty-six Grammy Awards including eight with the Chicago Symphony Orchestra and Chorus. Boulez is the sixth all-time Grammy winner, behind Beyoncé (thirty-two), Sir Georg Solti (thirty-one), Quincy Jones (twenty-eight), Alison Krauss, and Chick Corea (twenty-seven each). Boulez also received the academy's 2015 Lifetime Achievement Award.

Margaret Hillis, founder and longtime director of the Chicago Symphony Chorus, won nine Grammy Awards for her collaborations with the orchestra and Chorus. Hillis's successor Duain Wolfe, who served as director from 1994 until 2022, won two Grammy Awards for his work with the Chorus.

Grammy Award for Best Classical Album

- 1966 Charles Ives: Symphony No. 1 in D minor – Morton Gould, conductor; Howard Scott, producer (RCA)
- 1972 Gustav Mahler: Symphony No. 8 in E-flat major – Sir Georg Solti, conductor; David Harvey, producer (London)
- 1974 Hector Berlioz: Symphonie fantastique, Op. 14 – Sir Georg Solti, conductor; David Harvey, producer (London)
- 1975 Ludwig van Beethoven: The Nine Symphonies – Sir Georg Solti, conductor; Ray Minshull, producer (London)
- 1978 Johannes Brahms: Violin Concerto in D major, Op. 77 – Itzhak Perlman, violin; Carlo Maria Giulini, conductor; Christopher Bishop, producer (Angel)
- 1979 Johannes Brahms: The Four Symphonies – Sir Georg Solti, conductor; James Mallinson, producer (London)
- 1981 Gustav Mahler: Symphony No. 2 in C minor (Resurrection) – Sir Georg Solti, conductor; James Mallinson, producer (London)
- 1983 Gustav Mahler: Symphony No. 9 in D major – Sir Georg Solti, conductor; James Mallinson, producer (London)
- 1993 Béla Bartók: The Wooden Prince & Cantata profana – Pierre Boulez, conductor; John Aler & John Tomlinson, soloists; Karl-August Naegler, producer (Deutsche Grammophon)
- 1994 Béla Bartók: Concerto for Orchestra & Four Orchestral Pieces, Op. 12 – Pierre Boulez, conductor; Karl-August Naegler, producer (Deutsche Grammophon)
- 2010 Giuseppe Verdi: Messa da Requiem – Riccardo Muti, conductor; Christopher Alder, producer (CSO Resound)

Grammy Award for Best Orchestral Performance

- 1960 Béla Bartók: Music for Strings, Percussion and Celesta – Fritz Reiner, conductor (RCA)
- 1971 Gustav Mahler: Symphony No. 1 in D major – Carlo Maria Giulini, conductor (Angel)
- 1972 Gustav Mahler: Symphony No. 7 in E minor – Sir Georg Solti, conductor (London)
- 1974 Hector Berlioz: Symphonie fantastique, Op. 14 – Sir Georg Solti, conductor (London)
- 1976 Richard Strauss: Also sprach Zarathustra, Op. 30 – Sir Georg Solti, conductor (London)
- 1977 Gustav Mahler: Symphony No. 9 in D major – Carlo Maria Giulini, conductor (Deutsche Grammophon)
- 1979 Johannes Brahms: The Four Symphonies – Sir Georg Solti, conductor (London)
- 1980 Anton Bruckner: Symphony No. 6 in A major – Sir Georg Solti, conductor (London)
- 1981 Gustav Mahler: Symphony No. 2 in C minor (Resurrection) – Sir Georg Solti, conductor (London)
- 1982 Gustav Mahler: Symphony No. 7 in E minor – James Levine, conductor (RCA)
- 1983 Gustav Mahler: Symphony No. 9 in D major – Sir Georg Solti, conductor (London)
- 1986 Franz Liszt: A Faust Symphony – Sir Georg Solti, conductor (London)
- 1987 Ludwig van Beethoven: Symphony No. 9 in D minor, Op. 125 – Sir Georg Solti, conductor (London)
- 1990 Dmitri Shostakovich: Symphonies Nos. 1 & 7 (Leningrad) – Leonard Bernstein, conductor (Deutsche Grammophon)
- 1991 John Corigliano: Symphony No. 1 – Daniel Barenboim, conductor (Erato)
- 1993 Béla Bartók: The Wooden Prince – Pierre Boulez, conductor (Deutsche Grammophon)
- 1994 Béla Bartók: Concerto for Orchestra & Four Orchestral Pieces, Op. 12 – Pierre Boulez, conductor (Deutsche Grammophon)
- 1998 Gustav Mahler: Symphony No. 9 in D major – Pierre Boulez, conductor (Deutsche Grammophon)
- 2001 Edgard Varèse: Amériques, Arcana, Déserts, & Ionisation – Pierre Boulez, conductor (Deutsche Grammophon)
- 2008 Dmitri Shostakovich: Symphony No. 4 – Bernard Haitink, conductor (CSO Resound)

Grammy Award for Best Choral Performance

- 1972 Gustav Mahler: Symphony No. 8 in E-flat major – Chorus of the Vienna State Opera, Singverein Chorus, & Vienna Boys’ Choir; Norbert Balatsch & Helmut Froschauer, chorus masters; Sir Georg Solti, conductor (London)
- 1977 Giuseppe Verdi: Requiem Mass – Chicago Symphony Chorus; Margaret Hillis, director; Sir Georg Solti, conductor (RCA)
- 1978 Ludwig van Beethoven: Missa solemnis, in D major, Op. 123 – Chicago Symphony Chorus; Margaret Hillis, director; Sir Georg Solti, conductor (London)
- 1979 Johannes Brahms: A German Requiem, Op. 45 – Chicago Symphony Chorus; Margaret Hillis, director; Sir Georg Solti, conductor (London)
- 1982 Hector Berlioz: The Damnation of Faust, Op. 24 – Chicago Symphony Chorus; Margaret Hillis, director; Sir Georg Solti, conductor (London)
- 1983 Joseph Haydn: The Creation – Chicago Symphony Chorus; Margaret Hillis, director; Sir Georg Solti, conductor (London)
- 1984 Johannes Brahms: A German Requiem, Op. 45 – Chicago Symphony Chorus; Margaret Hillis, director; James Levine, conductor (RCA)
- 1986 Carl Orff: Carmina burana – Chicago Symphony Chorus; Margaret Hillis, director; James Levine, conductor (Deutsche Grammophon)
- 1991 Johann Sebastian Bach: Mass in B minor – Chicago Symphony Chorus; Margaret Hillis, director; Sir Georg Solti, conductor (London)
- 1993 Béla Bartók: Cantata profana – Chicago Symphony Chorus; Margaret Hillis, director; Pierre Boulez, conductor (Deutsche Grammophon)
- 2010 Giuseppe Verdi: Messa da Requiem – Chicago Symphony Chorus; Duain Wolfe, director; Riccardo Muti, conductor; (CSO Resound)

Grammy Award for Best Instrumental Soloist with Orchestra

- 1960 Johannes Brahms: Piano Concerto No. 2 in B-flat major, Op. 83 – Sviatoslav Richter, piano; Erich Leinsdorf, conductor (RCA)
- 1973 Ludwig van Beethoven: The Five Piano Concertos – Vladimir Ashkenazy, piano; Sir Georg Solti, conductor (London)
- 1979 Béla Bartók: Concertos for Piano nos. 1 and 2 – Maurizio Pollini, piano; Claudio Abbado, conductor (Deutsche Grammophon)
- 1982 Edward Elgar: Violin Concerto in B minor, Op. 61 – Itzhak Perlman, violin; Daniel Barenboim, conductor (Deutsche Grammophon)
- 1993 Alban Berg: Violin Concerto & Wolfgang Rihm: Time Chant – Anne-Sophie Mutter, violin; James Levine, conductor (Deutsche Grammophon)
- 2001 Richard Strauss: Horn Concerto No. 1, Duett-Concertino for Clarinet and Bassoon in F major, & Oboe Concerto in D major – Dale Clevenger, horn; Larry Combs, clarinet; David McGill, bassoon; Alex Klein, oboe; Daniel Barenboim, conductor (Teldec)

Grammy Award for Best Classical Vocal Performance

- 1964 Hector Berlioz: Les nuits d'été & Manuel de Falla El amor brujo – Leontyne Price, soprano; Fritz Reiner, conductor (RCA)

Grammy Award for Best Opera Recording

- 1985 Arnold Schoenberg: Moses und Aron – Franz Mazura & Philip Langridge, principal soloists; Sir Georg Solti, conductor; James Mallinson, producer (London)
- 1997 Richard Wagner: Die Meistersinger von Nürnberg – Karita Mattila, Iris Vermillion, Ben Heppner, Herbert Lippert, Alan Opie, René Pape, & José van Dam, principal soloists; Sir Georg Solti, conductor; Michael Woolcock, producer (London)
- 1998 Béla Bartók: Bluebeard's Castle – Jessye Norman & László Polgár, principal soloists; Pierre Boulez, conductor; Roger Wright, producer (Deutsche Grammophon)

Grammy Award for Best Classical Contemporary Composition

- 1991 John Corigliano: Symphony No. 1 – John Corigliano, composer (Erato)
- 1992 Samuel Barber: The Lovers – Samuel Barber, composer (Koch)

Grammy Award for Best Engineered Album, Classical

- 1962 Richard Strauss: Also sprach Zarathustra, Op. 30 – Lewis W. Layton, engineer; Fritz Reiner, conductor (RCA)
- 1972 Gustav Mahler: Symphony No. 8 in E-flat major – Gordon Parry & Kenneth Wilkinson, engineers; Sir Georg Solti, conductor (London)
- 1974 Hector Berlioz: Symphonie fantastique, Op. 14 – Kenneth Wilkinson, engineer; Sir Georg Solti, conductor (London)
- 1977 Maurice Ravel: Boléro – Kenneth Wilkinson, engineer; Sir Georg Solti, conductor (London)
- 1982 Gustav Mahler: Symphony No. 7 in E minor – Jay Saks, engineer; James Levine, conductor (RCA)
- 1983 Gustav Mahler: Symphony No. 9 in D major – James Lock, engineer; Sir Georg Solti, conductor (London)
- 1993 Béla Bartók: The Wooden Prince and Cantata profana – Pierre Boulez, conductor; Rainer Maillard, engineer (Deutsche Grammophon)
- 2008 Traditions and Transformations: Sounds of Silk Road Chicago – Miguel Harth-Bedoya and Alan Gilbert, conductors; Silk Road Ensemble, Yo-Yo Ma and Wu Man, soloists; David Frost, Tom Lazarus, and Christopher Willis, engineers (CSO Resound)
- 2020 Dimitri Shostakovich: Symphony No. 13 in B-Flat minor, Op. 113 (Babi Yar) – David Frost and Charlie Post, engineers; Riccardo Muti, conductor (CSO Resound)
- 2022 Mason Bates: Philharmonia Fantastique: The Making of the Orchestra – Shawn Murphy, Charlie Post, and Gary Rydstrom, engineers; Michael Romanowski, mastering engineer; Edwin Outwater, conductor (Sony Classical Records)
- 2023 Contemporary American Composers – David Frost and Charlie Post, engineers; Silas Brown, mastering engineer; Riccardo Muti, conductor (CSO Resound)
