= Patrick Carfizzi =

American opera singer (born 1974)

Patrick Carfizzi (born April 10, 1974) is an American operatic bass-baritone.

== Early life and education ==
Carfizzi is a native of Newburgh, New York, and began his studies with Sharon Christman at the Catholic University of America; further study followed with Doris and Richard Cross at Yale University before he spent three summers as an apprentice artist at Santa Fe Opera, where he debuted as Antonio in Le nozze di Figaro in 2000.

== Career ==
He bowed at the Metropolitan Opera as the Count Ceprano in Rigoletto in 1999, and has regularly returned to the house in such roles as Schaunard in La bohème; the Mandarin in Turandot; Masetto in Don Giovanni; Paolo in Simon Boccanegra; Brander in La damnation de Faust; and Quince in Benjamin Britten's A Midsummer Night's Dream. As of April 2023, he has appeared with the company more than 440 times. In 2001 he bowed at San Francisco Opera, portraying the Marquis d'Obigny in La traviata.

In September 2025, Patrick Carfizzi originated the role of Sheldon Anapol in the Metropolitan Opera's premiere of Mason Bates's The Amazing Adventures of Kavalier & Clay. He reprised the role for four additional performances in February 2026. Carfizzi also appeared in the production's Live in HD cinema presentation, recorded in October 2025 and release theatrically in January 2026, and on the opera's audio recording, release in August 2026.

At Seattle Opera he debuted in 2006 as Frank in Die Fledermaus. At Lyric Opera of Chicago he first appeared in the 2015–16 season, playing Zeta in The Merry Widow.

Other organizations with which he has appeared include the Boston Symphony, the Canadian Opera Company, the Dallas Opera, Houston Grand Opera, Minnesota Opera, the Opera Theatre of St. Louis, and the Seattle Symphony Orchestra.

His European debut came in 2011, when he sang Leporello at the Cologne Opera.

At one time, Carfizzi and his husband lived in Brussels.

== Philanthropy ==
Active as well as a philanthropist, in 2009 he founded Arts-LEAF, a nonprofit dedicated to providing mentoring in the arts.
