= Mothership (disambiguation) =

A mothership is a large vehicle that leads, serves, or carries other smaller vehicles.

Mothership or Mother ship may also refer to:

== Music ==
=== Albums ===
- Mothership (Led Zeppelin album), 2007
- Mothership (Dance Gavin Dance album), 2016
- Mother Ship, a 1980 album by Larry Young
- Mother Ship, a 2010 album by Lego Big Morl
- Mo Thugs III: The Mothership, a 2000 album by Mo Thugs Family

=== Songs ===
- "Mothership" (song), by Enter Shikari, 2006
- Mothership (composition), by Mason Bates, 2011
- "Mothership", a song by Aurora from the 2019 album A Different Kind of Human (Step 2)

== Other uses ==
- Mothership (website), a Singaporean community news service
- The Mothership, a cancelled science fiction film
- P-Funk Mothership, a space vehicle model in the P-Funk mythology
- Mothership (role-playing game), a science fiction survival horror role-playing game

== See also ==
- Mothership Connection, a 1975 album by the George Clinton band Parliament
