= Auditorium (composition) =

2016 composition by Mason Bates

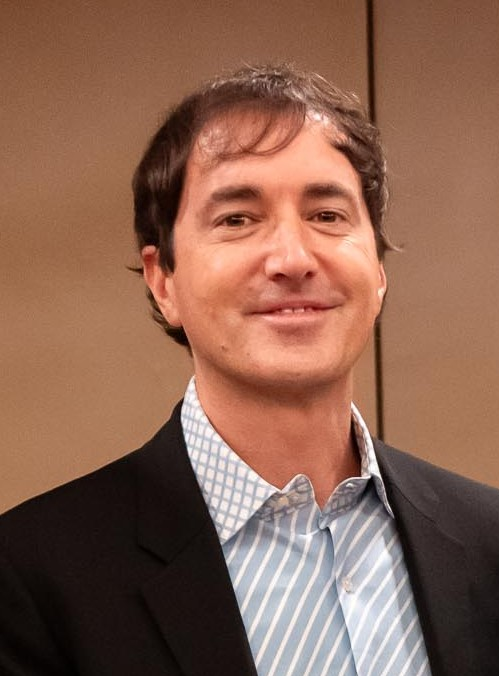
Mason Bates

Auditorium is a 2016 composition for electronica and orchestra by the American composer Mason Bates. The work was commissioned by the San Francisco Symphony with support from Larry and Michèle Corash. Its world premiere was given by the San Francisco Symphony conducted by Pablo Heras-Casado on April 27, 2016. The piece is dedicated to Larry and Michèle Corash.

== Composition ==
=== Background ===
Auditorium has a duration of approximately 20 minutes. The piece is scored for a small orchestra accompanied by a processed pre-recording of a smaller ensemble performing an original neo-Baroque composition by Bates. In the score program notes, Bates remarked, "Auditorium begins with the premise that an orchestra, like a person, can be possessed. The work haunts the San Francisco Symphony with ghostly processed recordings of a Baroque ensemble, with the electronic part consisting entirely of original neo-Baroque music created for the San Francisco Conservatory's Baroque ensemble, conducted by Corey Jamason." He added, "Essentially it is a work for two orchestras—one live, one dead."

Bates had only recently taken an interest in Baroque music, about which he said in a pre-premiere interview with the San Francisco Classical Voice, "Michael (Tilson Thomas) gave me a list of names to explore. Auditorium rises out of my love for 18th century music, which I'd not delved into until recently."

=== Instrumentation ===
The instrumentation of Auditorium consists of two flutes, two oboes, two clarinets, two bassoons, two horns, two trumpets, timpani, and strings. The instrumentation of the pre-recorded ensemble comprises flauto traverso, Baroque oboe, Baroque bassoon, natural horn, natural trumpet, theorbo, harpsichord, and strings. In accordance with the era, the Baroque ensemble is tuned a half-step lower than the orchestra.

== Reception ==
Reviewing the world premiere, Joshua Kosman of the San Francisco Chronicle said the piece "felt oddly undercooked — more like a 15-minute storyboarded mockup than a fully formed creation." He added, "Perhaps the biggest disappointment in Auditorium is how little it shares the orchestrational virtuosity of Bates' earlier works, including Alternative Energy and the recent phenomenal Anthology of Fantastic Zoology. Here he seems too busy bouncing back and forth between the two musical modes, old and new, to give either of them the requisite color or sheen." Conversely, Steven Winn of the San Francisco Classical Voice called it "ingratiating and good-natured work" and wrote, "What gave the piece its immediate currency was the conversation he set up between old and new, natural and recorded sound." Winn also noted an enthusiastic response from the audience, remarking, "A significant portion of Friday night's audience was on their feet and cheering, summoning Bates and conductor Pablo Heras-Casado out for multiple curtain calls. None of the politely disengaged applause that often greets a new work on first hearing was in evidence. This audience cared and made it known."
