= Colorado Children's Chorale =

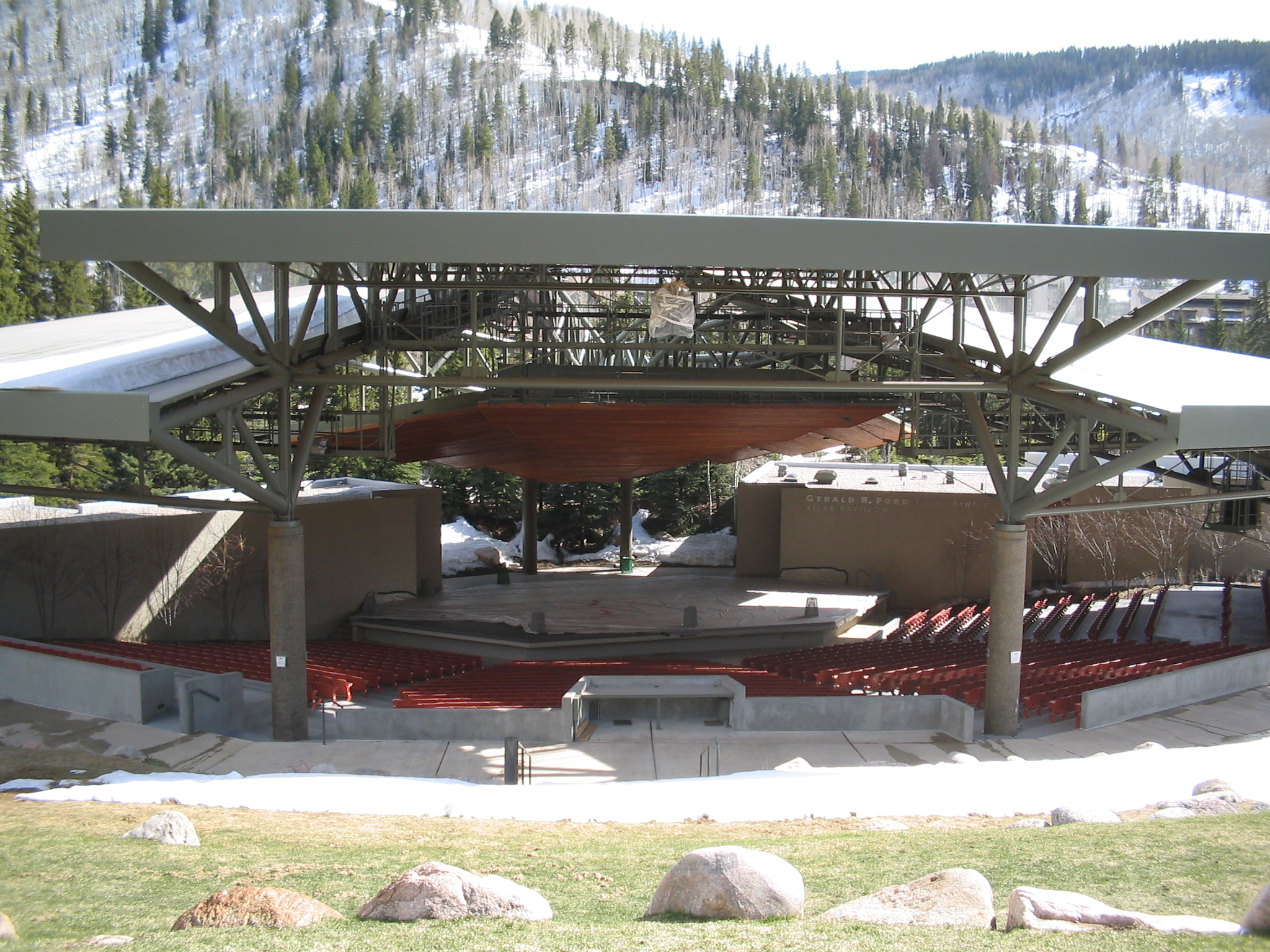
Gerald R. Ford amphitheater

The Colorado Children's Chorale is a singing group in Colorado established in 1974, a result of the assembly by founder Duain Wolfe of a youth ensemble to perform in Central City Opera's production of A Midsummer Night's Dream. Mr. Wolfe recognized the opportunity to fulfill an ongoing need for a professionally trained children's choral resource and as such, the primary mission of the Chorale as a performing ensemble remains to this day.

Under the leadership of Artistic Director Emily Crile and Executive Director Meg Steitz, the Colorado Children's Chorale annually trains more than 400 members between the ages of 7 and 14 from all social, economic and ethnic backgrounds, representing over 180 schools across the Front Range of Colorado. Additionally, the Chorale's Education Programs serve children from under-resourced communities throughout the Front Range through School Partnerships which provide weekly mentorship and music education to elementary students and teachers, as well as four non-auditioned community choirs which provide students an opportunity to rehearse and perform in their local communities. Both programs are provided free of charge to students and teachers.

Since its founding in 1974, the Chorale has sung performances with performing arts organizations including The Colorado Symphony, Central City Opera, Opera Colorado, Colorado Ballet, Opera Omaha, Toledo Opera, the Aspen Music Festival, the Grand Teton Music Festival, and the BBC Orchestra and Chorus of Wales. The Chorale has appeared with world-renowned artists Plácido Domingo, Zubin Mehta, James Levine and Richard Hickox. It also has performed for numerous dignitaries, including Pope John Paul II and the Dalai Lama, as well as presidents, emperors and first ladies of the world. Broadcast appearances include NBC's Today Show; CBS’ Christmas special, the Spirit of the Season, broadcast on CBS 4 Denver; and BBC broadcasts of the Chorale's Promenade Music Festival performance at Royal Albert Hall. Over the years, the Chorale has commissioned and premiered major works by such composers as Gary Fry, John Kuzma, Samuel Lancaster, Normand Lockwood and Stephen Paulus. In 2008, the Chorale commissioned and presented A Stream of Voices by Gene Scheer and David Shire, a musical written for and performed by children.

The Chorale performs by invitation across Colorado, nationally and internationally. Concert tours have taken the Chorale across the U.S. from small rural towns to large cities and have included performances at the White House and Lincoln Center for the Performing Arts. Internationally, the Chorale has performed in Brazil, Canada, China, England, France, Hong Kong, Italy, Japan, Scotland, South Africa, South Korea, Spain, Switzerland and Taiwan.

The Colorado Children's Chorale is a 501(c)3 nonprofit organization.

== Performances ==
Over the years, the Chorale has visited many places in Colorado and across the US, as well as countries such as China, Spain, France, Great Britain, Brazil, and South Korea. Founded by American choral director, Duain Wolfe the Chorale has achieved national recognition, appearing on NBC’s Today Show, CBS Christmas specials and BBC broadcasts of The Proms at Royal Albert Hall with the BBC Orchestra and Chorus of Wales. They have also performed with Opera Colorado, Colorado Ballet, Opera Omaha, Toledo Opera and at many summer festivals such as the Aspen Music Festival, where they sang the children's chorus in a 1994 performance of Mahler's Symphony No. 8. They have appeared with many classical and popular musicians, such as Plácido Domingo, Zubin Mehta, James Levine, Philippe Entremont, Harlem Boys Choir, Richard Hickox, Three Dog Night, Bob Hope, Danny Thomas, Tony Randall, Kathie Lee Gifford, Celine Dion, John Denver, Bobby McFerrin, Michael McDonald, Hazel Miller, Linda Ronstadt and Natalie Cole. They performed for the Opening Ceremonies of the 1995 Olympic Festival in Atlanta, 1993 World Youth Day Vigil for Pope John Paul II and the 2008 Democratic National Convention, in addition to performances for the Dalai Lama as well as presidents, emperors and first ladies of the world. As part of their performance tradition, the Chorale often performs with choreography, and works with many directors and choreographers. Wolfe retired as Artistic Director of the Colorado Children's Chorale in 1999.

== Vail Residency ==
Each year, Tour Choir attends a performance residency in Vail, Colorado to learn and prepare repertoire for the upcoming season. With support from the local community, while in residency, the Chorale provides a 3-day performance workshop at no charge for children ages 7–11 from the Eagle and Summit County areas. The residency culminates in a free public performance held at the Gerald R. Ford Amphitheatre.
