= Civic Auditorium =

Civic Auditorium is a name commonly used for a city's auditorium and/or arena:

== Canada ==
- Oshawa Civic Auditorium in Oshawa, Ontario
- Estevan Civic Auditorium in Estevan, Saskatchewan

== United States ==
- Pasadena Civic Auditorium in Pasadena, California
- Bill Graham Civic Auditorium (formerly known as the San Francisco Civic Auditorium) in San Francisco, California
- San Jose Civic Auditorium in San Jose, California
- Santa Cruz Civic Auditorium in Santa Cruz, California
- Santa Monica Civic Auditorium in Santa Monica, California
- Stockton Memorial Civic Auditorium in Stockton, California
- Welsh Auditorium (formerly known as Civic Auditorium), in Grand Rapids, Michigan
- Civic Auditorium (Clarksdale, Mississippi), a Mississippi Landmark
- Omaha Civic Auditorium in Omaha, Nebraska
- Albuquerque Civic Auditorium in Albuquerque, New Mexico
- The Dalles Civic Auditorium in The Dalles, Oregon
- Keller Auditorium (formerly known as the Portland Civic Auditorium) in Portland, Oregon
- Mechanics Bank Theater and Convention Center (formerly known as the Civic Auditorium) in Bakersfield, California
- La Porte Civic Auditorium in La Porte, Indiana
- Glendale Civic Auditorium in Glendale, California
