= The (R)evolution of Steve Jobs =

Opera by Mason Bates

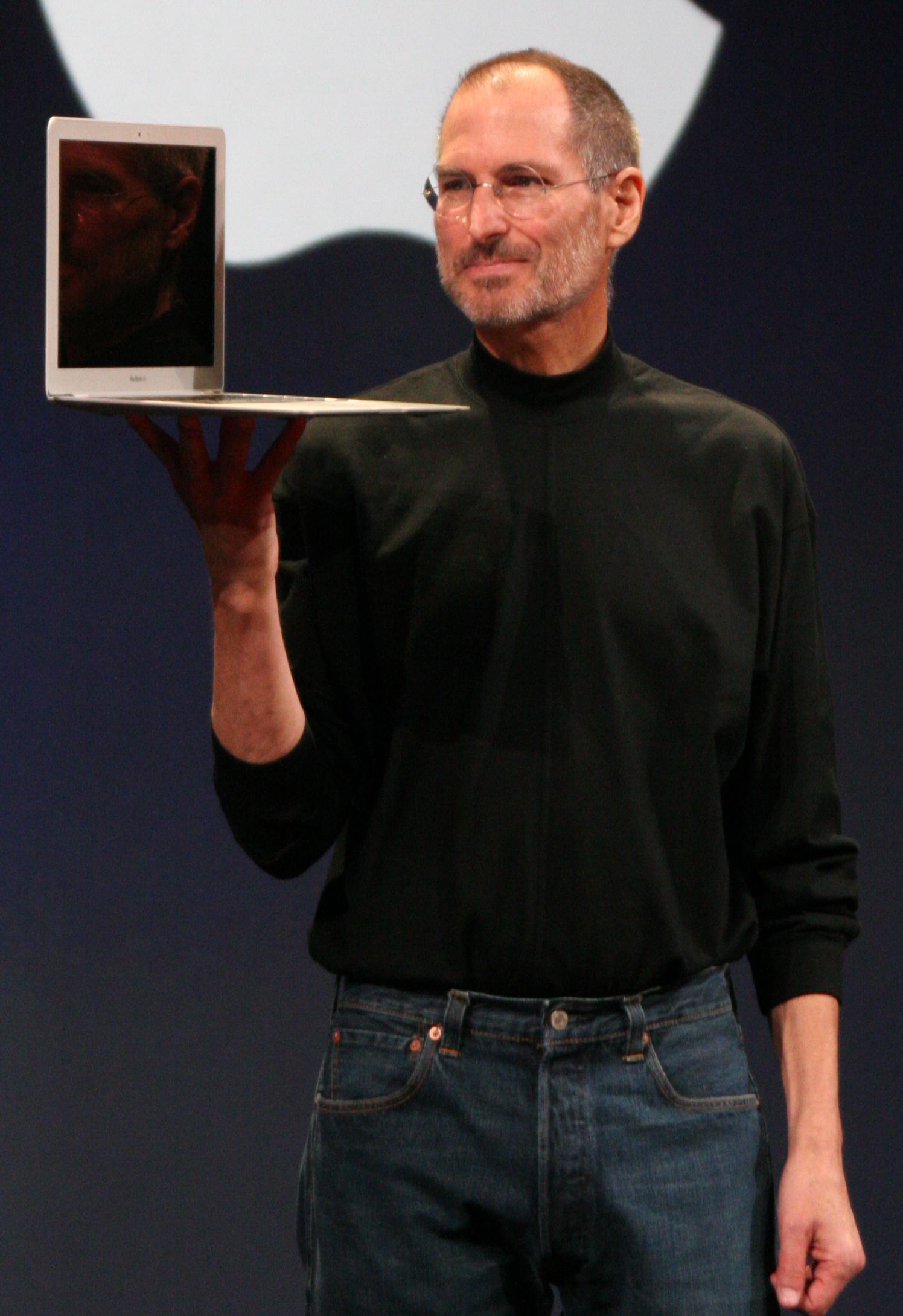
Steve Jobs holds up a MacBook Air

The (R)evolution of Steve Jobs is an opera with music by American composer Mason Bates and an English-language libretto by Mark Campbell. It was commissioned by Santa Fe Opera, Seattle Opera, San Francisco Opera, the Jacobs School of Music at Indiana University, with support from Cal Performances. The opera is about Steve Jobs, one of the most influential people in recent history; it is set at a time when he must confront his own mortality and circle back on the events that shaped his personal and professional life.

== Performance history ==
The world premiere took place at the Santa Fe Opera in 2017, conducted by Michael Christie. The original production featured direction by Kevin Newbury, scenic design by Vita Tzykun, costume design by Paul Carey, lighting design by Japhy Weideman, projection design by Ben Pearcy for 59 Productions, and sound design by Rick Jacobsohn and Brian Losch; it was a co-production of Santa Fe Opera, Seattle Opera, San Francisco Opera, and the Indiana University Jacobs School of Music. The (R)evolution of Steve Jobs was the most popular new opera in Santa Fe Opera's history and one of the top-selling operas in the company's history. An extra performance had to be added to accommodate the demand for tickets.

In May 2018, a recording of the work was issued under the Pentatone label; Bates and Campbell received Grammy Award nominations for Best Contemporary Classical Composition, engineers Mark Donahue and Dirk Sobotka were nominated for Best Engineered Album (Classical), and Elizabeth Ostrow was nominated for Producer of the Year (Classical). The recording won the 2019 Grammy Award for Best Opera Recording (honoring conductor Michael Christie, producer Elizabeth Ostrow, and principal soloists Sasha Cooke, Jessica E. Jones, Edward Parks, Garrett Sorenson, and Wei Wu).

Bates was drawn to Steve Jobs as the subject for an opera, because, he says, opera "can illuminate the interior thoughts of different characters simultaneously through the juxtaposition of individual themes. That makes it an ideal medium to explore a man who revolutionized how we communicate." Bates asked Mark Campbell, one of America's leading opera librettists, to create the story in the libretto. According to Campbell, “Learning that Jobs was a Buddhist his entire adult life lead me to the ensō, the circle that is drawn in Japanese calligraphy to express enlightenment. I connected that with Jobs’ habit of taking long walks and the Zen practice of pacing in a circular pattern called a kinhin and began to develop a story in which Steve 'circles back' on his life. The title actually refers less to the revolution Jobs helped create in technology rather than the kinhin of self-reflection that propels the story." Gary Rydstrom of Skywalker Sound assisted Bates with the production of the opera’s electronic sounds.

There have been several other presentations of the original Santa Fe production:

- Indiana University's Jacobs School of Music presented four performances of the opera in 2018 in their Musical Arts Center. Michael Christie conducted a student cast.
- Seattle Opera presented the opera in McCaw Hall, with seven performances in February and March 2019. Garrett Sorenson reprised the role of "Woz", and Nicole Paiement conducting in her Seattle Opera debut.
- A production at the Lyric Opera of Kansas City was scheduled for Spring 2021 but was postponed due to the COVID-19 pandemic. Three performances for the Lyric Opera of Kansas City were performed at the Kauffman Center in March 2022.
- Atlanta Opera had four performances at the Cobb Energy Center between April 30 and May 8, 2022.
- Calgary Opera had three performances in February 2023.
- Utah Opera had five performances planned in May 2023, but only one took place due to a cast member's illness after the first performance.
- San Francisco Opera presented the California premiere of the opera at the War Memorial Opera House for a run in September and October 2023. Sasha Cooke and Wei Wu reprised their roles from the Santa Fe run, with John Moore singing the role of Steve Jobs and Bille Bruley as Steve Wozniak. Michael Christie returned as conductor. (This performance run was originally scheduled for the summer of 2020; it was postponed due to the COVID-19 pandemic.)
- Washington National Opera presented the Washington, D.C. premiere of the opera at the Kennedy Center Opera House in May, 2025 in a six-performance run. The production featured baritone John Moore in the title role, conducted by Lidiya Yankovskaya, and directed by Rebecca Herman.

== Roles ==
Role	Voice type	Original Premiere Production 22 July 2017 (Conductor: Michael Christie)	Tomer Zvulun Production: Austin Opera, Atlanta Opera, Lyric Opera Kansas City, Utah Opera (Conductor: Michael Christie)	San Francisco Opera / Original Production Fall 2023 (Conductor: Michael Christie)	Washington National Opera / Zvulun Production, May 2025 (Conductor: Lidiya Yankovskaya)
Steve Jobs	baritone	Edward Parks	John Moore	John Moore	John Moore
Laurene Powell	mezzo-soprano	Sasha Cooke	Sarah Larsen	Sasha Cooke	Winona Martin
"Woz" (Steve Wozniak)	tenor	Garrett Sorenson	Bille Bruley	Bille Bruley	Jonathan Burton
Kōbun Chino Otogawa	bass	Wei Wu	Wei Wu	Wei Wu	Wei Wu
Chrisann Brennan	soprano	Jessica E. Jones	Madison Leonard/Liz Sutphen	Olivia Smith	Kresley Figueroa
Paul Jobs	baritone	Kelly Markgraf	Mark Diamond/Daniel Armstrong	Joseph Lattanzi	Justin Burgess
Calligraphy teacher	mezzo-soprano	Mariya Kaganskaya	Gretchen Krupp	Gabrielle Beitag	Michelle Mariposa

== Synopsis ==
This one-act opera features roles based on real-life figures Steve Jobs, Steve Wozniak, Chrisann Brennan, Kōbun Chino Otogawa, and Laurene Powell. Inspired by the life and creative spirit of Steve Jobs, the opera does not purport to depict actual events as they occurred or statements, beliefs, or opinions of the persons depicted.

In a garage in Los Altos, California, Paul Jobs gives his 10-year-old son Steve a homemade workbench, a gesture of encouragement and a symbol of a beginning. Years later, an adult Steve stands before a huge audience in San Francisco and introduces his new brainchild, “one device”, a product designed to unite technology and people. He finishes the presentation, barely able to contain the weakness caused by illness.

In his office in Cupertino, California, Steve avoids a conversation with his wife Laurene, who asks him to go home and take care of himself. He retreats — into solitude, in search of inner balance.

In the hills, he meets a figure from the past: Kobun, his deceased mentor in the Sōtō Zen school. During a meditative walk and silent observation of the setting sun, Steve begins to remember his youth and a calligraphy lesson - about the Japanese symbol ensō, a circle drawn in one stroke, as a reflection of elegance and simplicity.

The memories take us to the 1970s. Steve and his friend Steve Wozniak ("Woz") create a "blue box" - a device that can fool the telephone network. Woz presses a button - and dials the Vatican, pretending to be Henry Kissinger. They laugh like children, not believing that they managed to outsmart the world. Victory over the system gives a taste of freedom, power, risk.

In an apple orchard, after taking the LSD, Steve and his girlfriend Chrisann experience a psychedelic vision: the orchard comes to life like a Bach orchestra. Their intimacy is interrupted by Kobun, who informs Steve that he cannot live at the Zen Center (as he had hoped) and hints in a parable that his destiny may lie elsewhere.

Then comes his first meeting with Lauren.

But spiritual and personal connections cannot withstand the pressure of ambition. Chrisann announces her pregnancy, Steve pushes her away, and with Woz he continues to dream of a computer as a musical instrument - simple, alive, creative.

Gradually, the thirst for control turns Steve into a tyrant. He destroys his relationships with Chrisann and Woz, losing trust and then control over his own company. The world he created begins to reject him.

Lost and sick, Steve returns home. Lauren - his mirror and voice of truth - asks him to accept reality and change. Steve is left alone. Kobun appears again and leads him through fragments of the past: pain, failure, love, discovery. In these images, Steve learns that he was loved and that he himself knew how to love.

In the chapel of Stanford University, two events take place at once: Steve and Laurene's wedding, and - mysteriously - his own memorial ceremony. Space and time collapse. Kobun tells him to be still, to simplify. Steve finally accepts the inevitable.

In the end, Lauren is left alone. Remembering her husband, she says: "Yes, he will be praised. He will be criticized. But no one will be able to say that he did not leave a mark."

The last scene returns us to the garage: Paul Jobs gives the boy Steve a workbench - "a fine place to start." The circle is closed.

== Discography ==
- Parks, Cooke, Wu, Sorenson; Christie, 2017 (Pentatone (record label)) - Grammy Award Winner, Best Opera Recording
