= YouTube Symphony Orchestra =

Orchestra assembled by open auditions hosted by YouTube

The YouTube Symphony Orchestra (YTSO) was an orchestra assembled by open auditions hosted by YouTube, the London Symphony Orchestra and several other worldwide partners. Launched on December 1, 2008, it was the first online collaborative orchestra.

== 2009 ==
The open call for entries was until January 28, 2009. Musicians wishing to audition had to post a video of themselves playing the "Internet Symphony No. 1 'Eroica'", by Tan Dun, along with a second talent video of themselves playing a preset audition piece to YouTube. Musicians of all cultures were encouraged to audition, as even if a particular instrument was not specifically scored in the original composition, a musician could play a part in the same pitch range as their chosen instrument. Judges selected finalists and alternates from January 29 to February 13, 2009, and the finalists were voted on by the YouTube community from February 14 to February 22, 2009.

Winners were announced on March 2, and were invited to travel to New York in April 2009, to participate in the YouTube Symphony Orchestra summit, and play at Carnegie Hall under the direction of Michael Tilson Thomas. As of the concert date, there were 15 million views of the YouTube audition tapes. The concert featured a series of short pieces that had been rehearsed for several days, as well as guest soloists Joshua Roman, Gil Shaham, Measha Brueggergosman, Yuja Wang, and classical / electronica composer Mason Bates. Three children were tutored for the event by pianist Lang Lang and played Rachmaninoff's waltz for piano six hands.

The Tan Dun submissions were compiled into a mashup video premiered at Carnegie Hall on April 15, then hosted on the "YouTube Symphony Channel" as of April 16.

== 2011 ==
On October 12, 2010, a video posted on the YouTube Symphony channel announced that they would be doing a second symphony, this time performing at the Sydney Opera House on March 20, 2011. Tilson Thomas would again be directing, and had asked Bates to write a piece, entitled Mothership, in which performers would be invited to improvise with the orchestra, both live and via an uplink. A video of the LSO performing Mothership was posted on YouTube on October 11, 2010.

The concert also featured a performance of Mozart's "Caro bell'idol mio" by Renée Fleming and the Sydney Children's Choir.

Like the previous year, contestants were required to record themselves performing the piece on their own instruments. However, since the piece includes sections of improvisation, players were also invited to submit clips of themselves improvising. Applications closed on November 28, 2010.

The performance was broadcast live on Sunday 20 March [of 2011] at 8pm Sydney time, with rebroadcasts being done throughout the day for each time zone. The completed performance was uploaded to YouTube at the end of March 20 and can now be viewed on the symphony channel. It was "the most-watched live music concert on the Internet", and "the most frequently viewed concert in the history of the video-sharing website".

== Reception ==
As of March 20, 2011, the concert's live feed was the 21st most viewed event on YouTube's Musicians Channel. The live stream of the Grand Finale concert at the Sydney Opera House was the largest live stream YouTube ever made, connecting 30.7 million streams on computers and a further 2.8 million streams on mobile devices. The previous leader was U2 live on YouTube.
