= Cello Concerto (Bates) =

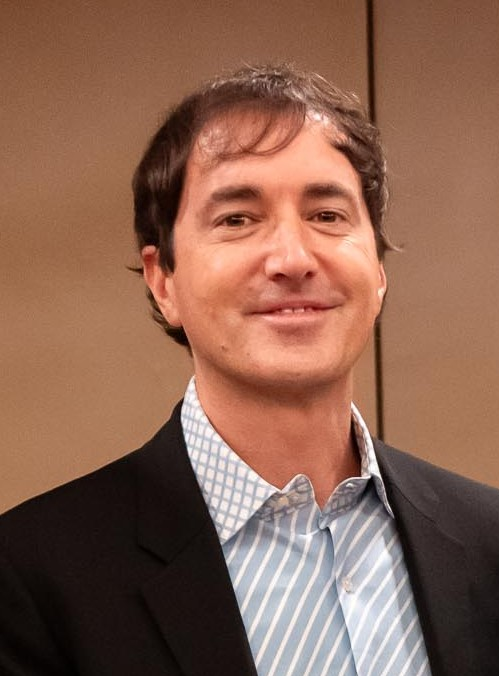
Mason Bates

The Cello Concerto of Mason Bates is an American concerto for cello and orchestra, dating from 2014. The work was a joint commission by the Seattle Symphony, the Columbus Symphony Orchestra, and the Los Angeles Chamber Orchestra. It received its premiere on December 11, 2014 by the cellist Joshua Roman, former principal cellist of the Seattle Symphony and for whom Bates composed the concerto, and the Seattle Symphony, conducted by Mirga Gražinytė-Tyla.

== Composition ==
The Cello Concerto has a duration of roughly 25 minutes and is composed in three movements:

1. Con moto – Grazioso – Con moto
2. Serene
3. Léger

The work is scored for solo cello and orchestra, where the orchestra consists of two flutes (2nd doubling piccolo and alto flute), two oboes, two clarinets (2nd doubling bass clarinet), two bassoons (2nd doubling contrabassoon), four French horns, three trumpets, two tenor trombones, bass trombone, tuba, timpani, three percussionists, harp, and strings.

== Reception ==
Reviewing the world premiere, Melinda Bargreen of The Seattle Times praised the work for its "audience-friendly tonal language" and Techno-inspired orchestration. Bargreen wrote, "Attractive and tonal, featuring a first-rate soloist, this was a premiere that an audience could really appreciate, and the standing ovation was so enthusiastic that Roman finally returned for a solo encore". Philippa Kiraly of the Classical Voice North America also lauded the piece, saying its "classical lyricism and melody combine fluidly with blues, jazz elements, and techno rhythms that come straight from the 21st-century electronic club scene." Lynn Green of The Columbus Dispatch commended Bates for "capitaliz[ing] on the natural, organic aspects of musicianship in his cello concerto." Green added, "This challenging work is not so much about melody as expressions of color, texture and energy."

Roman has since performed the concerto to critical acclaim with such orchestras as the Berkeley Symphony, the Oklahoma City Philharmonic and the Fort Worth Symphony Orchestra.
