= Alternative Energy (composition) =

2012 symphony composed by Mason Bates

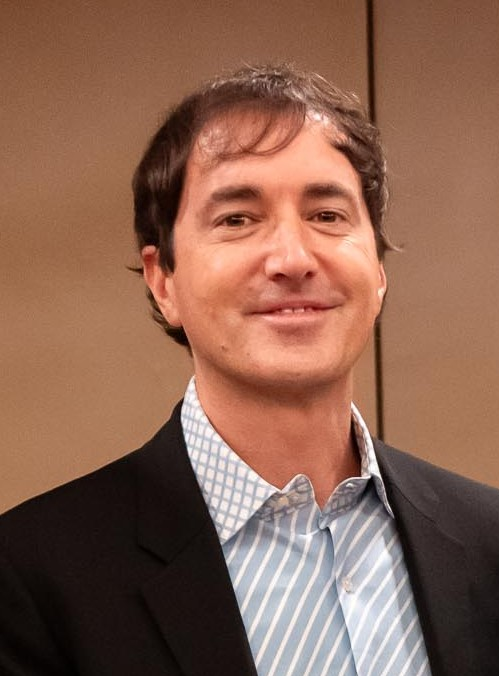
Mason Bates

Alternative Energy is a symphony for electronica and orchestra in four movements by the American composer Mason Bates. The work was commissioned by the Chicago Symphony Orchestra, for whom Bates was then composer-in-residence. It was premiered by the orchestra under conductor Riccardo Muti at Symphony Center in Chicago, February 2, 2012.

== Composition ==
Similar to Bates's first symphony Liquid Interface, Alternative Energy chronicles environmental devastation of the Earth over a large timespan. Bates described the meaning of the work in the score program notes, writing:

Alternative Energy is an 'energy symphony' spanning four movements and hundreds of years. Beginning in a rustic Midwestern junkyard in the late 19th Century, the piece travels through ever greater and more powerful forces of energy — a present-day particle collider, a futuristic Chinese nuclear plant — until it reaches a future Icelandic rainforest, where humanity’s last inhabitants seek a return to a simpler way of life.

The symphony has a duration of roughly 25 minutes and is composed in four movements:

1. Ford's Farm, 1896 (an amateur fiddler invents a car)
2. Chicago, 2012 (including the FermiLab particle accelerator)
3. Xinjiang Province, 2112 (twilight on an industrial wasteland)
4. Reykjavik, 2222 (an Icelandic Rain Forest)

Alternative Energy is scored for electronica and orchestra, comprising three flutes (2nd doubling alto flute, all doubling piccolo), three oboes (3rd doubling English horn), three clarinets (2nd doubling E♭ clarinet), three bassoons (3rd doubling contrabassoon), four French horns, three trumpets, two trombones, bass trombone, tuba, three percussionists, harp, piano, and strings.

== Reception ==
Reviewing the world premiere, John von Rhein of the Chicago Tribune praised the mature accessibility of the piece, despite noting, "While I found the piece enjoyable and entertaining, I do wish Bates would dig deeper harmonically, challenge himself and his audience rather more. Navigating the fine line between accessibility and complexity, he continues to opt too readily for the former, in my view." Lawrence A. Johnson of the Chicago Classical Review similarly criticized the work. Despite lauding an "engaging, artless audacity" to Bates's music, Johnson wrote:

Yet I confess I found much of Alternative Energy overblown, slick and superficial, centered on surface sonic glitz and "hip" populist riffing with little musical substance at its core. Bates' music is concentrated on pulsing rhythms and shifting beats almost to the exclusion of everything else. Ultimately, that doesn’t have a whole lot to offer over the long term, much less enough to sustain a 25-minute symphony for large orchestra.

Joshua Kosman of the San Francisco Chronicle was more positive, however, describing the symphony as "fantastic" and opining, "Bates [...] writes music that is simultaneously old-fashioned in its outlook and bracingly new in its demeanor, and it satisfies the same urge for accessible novelty that people find in the other arts."
