= The Amazing Adventures of Kavalier & Clay (opera) =

2025 opera by Mason Bates

- Opera by Mason Bates
- Librettist: Gene Scheer
- Language: English
- Based on: The Amazing Adventures of Kavalier & Clay by Michael Chabon
- Premiere: September 21, 2025; Metropolitan Opera

The Amazing Adventures of Kavalier & Clay is an opera with music by American composer Mason Bates and a libretto by Gene Scheer, based on the novel of the same name by Michael Chabon. It was commissioned by the Metropolitan Opera and premiered on September 21, 2025, opening the company's 2025–26 season. Following its premiere run, four additional performances were presented in February 2026 in a rare same-season revival. The production was filmed for broadcast in the Metropolitan Opera's Live in HD series and for Great Performances on PBS.

== Performance history ==
The Amazing Adventures of Kavalier & Clay was commissioned by the Metropolitan Opera in 2018. The opera received its world premiere at the Jacobs School of Music, Indiana University Bloomington, in November 2024 conducted by Michael Christie.

The opera was substantially revised ahead of its professional premiere at the Metropolitan Opera in New York, which opened on September 21, 2025, inaugurating the company's 2025–26 season. The production was conducted by Yannick Nézet-Séguin and directed by Bartlett Sher, with choreography by Mandy Moore, costumes by Jennifer Moeller, sound by Rick Jacobsohn, and set, lighting, and projection design by 59 Studio. The principal cast included Andrzej Filończyk as Joe Kavalier, Miles Mykkanen as Sam Clay, Sun-Ly Pierce as Rosa Saks, Edward Nelson as Tracy Bacon, and Lauren Snouffer as Sarah.

On October 10, 2025, the Metropolitan Opera announced four additional performances in a rare mid-season extension to the run due to audience demand. The Met reported that the final performances of the fall run sold out, and Kavalier & Clay attracted notably new and younger audiences: 35% were new to the Met, 50% were aged 50 or younger, and 30% were aged 40 or younger.

The original production was recorded on October 2, 2025. It was added to the Metropolitan Opera Live in HD season and premiered on January 24, 2026. The broadcast premiered on PBS Great Performances on April 1, 2026.

== Roles ==
Roles, voice types, premiere cast
Role	Voice type	Metropolitan Opera September 21, 2025 Conductor: Yannick Nézet-Séguin
Joe Kavalier	lyric baritone	Andrzej Filończyk
Sam Clay	lyric tenor	Miles Mykkanen
Rosa Saks	mezzo-soprano	Sun-Ly Pierce
Tracy Bacon	baritone	Edward Nelson
Sarah	lyric soprano	Lauren Snouffer
Gerhard	dramatic baritone	Craig Colclough
Sheldon Anapol	bass-baritone	Patrick Carfizzi
Estelle Kavalier	lyric soprano	Ellie Dehn
Esther Klayman	mezzo-soprano	Eve Gigliotti
Salvador Dalì	baritone	Efraín Solís
Solomon Kavalier	lyric tenor	Richard Croft
Harry	baritone	John Moore
Helen	soprano	Amanda Batista

== Synopsis ==
=== Act 1 ===
In 1939, Joe Kavalier, a Czech Jewish artist and amateur escape artist, flees Nazi-occupied Prague and travels to Brooklyn, where he joins his cousin Sam Clay and aunt Esther. Determined to rescue his family from Europe, Joe partners with Sam, a writer, to create a comic-book superhero known as the Escapist, whose stories encourage American resistance to fascism. Backed by businessman Sheldon Anapol, the character becomes a commercial success.

Joe meets Rose Saks, an artist working with a refugee aid organization that arranges passage for children fleeing Europe aboard a ship called the Ark of Miriam. As Joe and Rosa fall in love, they plan to secure safe passage for Joe's younger sister, Sarah. Meanwhile, Sam begins a romantic relationship with actor Tracy Bacon, who portrays the Escapist on radio. Their relationship develops privately, reflecting the constraints faced by gay men at the time.

As the Escapist franchise expands, the characters' personal lives deepen, but tragedy strikes when news arrives that the Ark of Miriam has been destroyed by German forces. Upon learning that Sarah is presumed dead, Joe suffers a public emotional collapse.

=== Act 2 ===
Grieving the loss of his family, Joe withdraws from those around him and ultimately enlists in the military, deploying to Europe.

In New York, Sam attends a clandestine farewell gathering for Tracy before his deployment, where gay men—including prominent businessmen and a Congressman—have assembled. The gathering is raided by federal agents; Sam avoids arrest but is assaulted by an agent, leaving him deeply shaken. Rosa finds Sam in the aftermath, and the two confide in one another. She reveals that she is pregnant with Joe's child, and Sam, fearing a future alone, proposes marriage. Rosa accepts, and the two establish a life together on Long Island, raising the child and continuing the production of Escapist comics. Over the course of three years, Rose assumes an increasingly central creative role, introducing a new character, Luna Moth, inspired by Joe's stories.

Meanwhile, Joe experiences the war firsthand in Europe and encounters Tracy, who reveals that Rosa has written to him extensively. After Tracy is killed in combat, Joe begins reading Rosa's letters and learns of his child. Guided by these revelations, he returns to the United States and reunites with Rosa, Sam, and his daughter, also named Sarah. Sam departs for California to pursue writing, beginning work on The Amazing Adventures of Kavalier & Clay.

== Reception ==
Adam Nagourney for The New York Times mentions that its final two performances at the Metropolitan Opera were sold out, not a common event at the Met, and that the opera attracted particularly first-time and younger audiences. Joshua Barone, also for The New York Times, is impressed with Sher's direction and the production design, but disappointed by the music's obviousness and film music quality. Justin Davidson for Vulture praises production staff and performers, but compares the opera's musical substance unfavourably with Verdi's operas. Francisco Salazar for OperaWire was surprised how well Scheer adapted the long novel into a libretto that provided ample time for the music to develop and its poetic language. He also noted the filmic quality of much of the music, but praised the melodic lines and Bates' general treatment of the singer–orchestra balance. Salazar is particularly struck by the direction and stage design.

== Accolades ==
The opera is nominated for Best Contemporary Classical Composition at the 69th Annual Grammy Awards.

== Recordings ==
- Live performance broadcast (recorded October 2, 2025) for Metropolitan Opera Live in HD and Great Performances on PBS [Nézet-Séguin; Snouffer, Pierce, Mykkanen, Filończyk, Nelson] It is available for streaming as a rental or by subscription at Met Opera on Demand.
