= Auditorium Hotel =

Auditorium Hotel may refer to:

in the United States

(by state)

- Auditorium Building, which formerly included Auditorium Hotel, at University of Chicago, in Chicago, Illinois
- Robert E. Lee Hotel (St. Louis, Missouri), known also as Auditorium Hotel, listed on the NRHP in Missouri
