= Violin Concerto (Bates) =

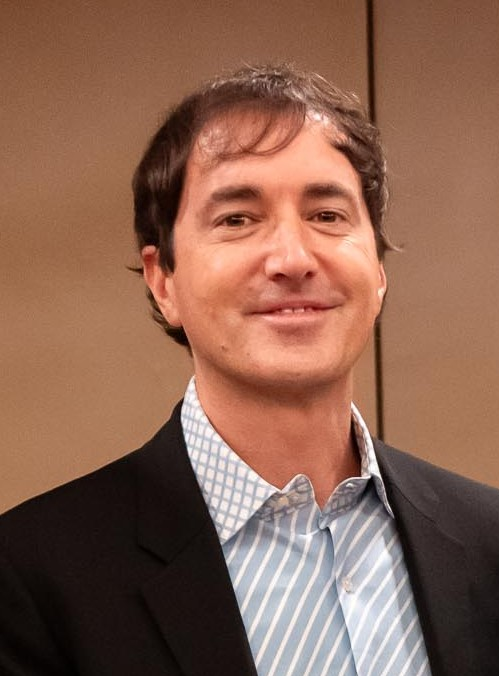
Mason Bates

The Violin Concerto is a concerto for violin and orchestra by the American composer Mason Bates. The work was commissioned by the Pittsburgh Symphony Orchestra and violinist Anne Akiko Meyers. It was premiered December 7, 2012, with Meyers and the Pittsburgh Symphony performing under conductor Leonard Slatkin.

== Structure ==
The Violin Concerto has a duration of roughly 25 minutes and is composed in three continuous movements:

1. Archaeopteryx
2. Lakebed Memories
3. The Rise of the Birds

== Composition ==
=== Background ===
The Pittsburgh Symphony commissioned Bates's Violin Concerto at the behest of a recommendation from composer John Adams and principal guest conductor Leonard Slatkin. Slatkin had previously led the orchestra in a performance of Bates's Liquid Interface and lauded Bates to the symphony's vice president Bob Moir as a "terrific young composer." Violinist Anne Akiko Meyers had also sought a commission from Bates, remarking before the work's premiere:

I've known Mason for several years. I've done some concerts where he was the DJ, so I've seen him in action that way. I asked him to write cadenzas in Beethoven's Concerto for a performance in Holland, and I always wanted a concerto from him. I thought he would write something dynamic and exciting. A couple of years ago, I really got on his tail, harassing him until he agreed.

Bates later spoke of the experience, saying, "I've written a lot for strings in the orchestra, but writing for solo violin is completely different. It was like writing a one-person play in a language you don't speak. It was very intimidating at first." The piece was completed in the summer of 2012, with Meyers remarking, "we were changing things right and left—it was definitely an evolution."

=== Style ===
Bates described the style of the piece in the score program notes, writing:

Composers paint with sound, and my sonic palette has been growing rapidly in large-scale symphonies fusing orchestral and electronic sounds. But the pops, clicks and thuds of techno present challenges in a violin concerto: the subtle textures of this eighteen-inch instrument would be quickly painted over by the powerful colors of such a big palette. So, in order to fully showcase the violin, I stepped back into the acoustic universe—but with my ears still humming with exotic sounds.

=== Instrumentation ===
The piece is scored for solo violin and orchestra comprising two flutes (2nd doubling piccolo), two oboes (2nd doubling English horn), two clarinets in B-flat (2nd doubling bass clarinet), two bassoons (2nd doubling contrabassoon), four French horns, four trumpets in C, two trombones, bass trombone, tuba, three percussionists, timpani, piano, harp, and strings.

== Reception ==
Reviewing the world premiere, Mark Kanny of the Pittsburgh Tribune-Review praised the Violin Concerto, saying, "The outer movements are high-energy excursions, driven by the composer's gifts for inventive rhythms, lyrical inspiration and a combination of moment-to-moment persuasiveness and feeling of formal satisfaction." Andrew Druckenbrod of the Pittsburgh Post-Gazette lauded the work for having "more than a few exhilarating moments," but criticized Bates for limiting his ambition, remarking, "I am not begrudging Mr. Bates from going where his muse takes him. But I am concerned that the pull of tradition may be tugging on him, making him feel he needs to prove himself as a 'real' composer." Druckenbrod nevertheless said, "Despite the ambitious program of the work [...] there were some compelling musical moments." John von Rhein of the Chicago Tribune also praised the work, writing, "If Bates' big tune smacks of the Hollywood cornfields, he won me over when the fiddle engaged in dreamy dialogues with the percussion in the middle movement, and again when the violin soared in glimmering arcs high above the full orchestra in the finale." John Pitcher of ArtsNash said:

There’s much to admire in the new concerto. Bates loads the work with interesting effects that seem both primeval and contemporary at the same time. For instance, in the opening of the piece, he calls on the bassists and cellists to tap their instruments with their hands. The sound could be primitive percussion, or the beat of a DJ’s drum machine. This primordial opening eventually gives way to a few drop-dead gorgeous melodies.

Pitcher added, "Unfortunately, these melodies often come across as little more than beautiful moments in an otherwise tedious half-hour. Melodies in the concerto frequently meander without a sense of purpose or destination. The work’s musical argument is likewise loose, sometimes amounting to nothing more than slow sections following fast sections." However, Pitcher ultimately praised the solo writing and referred to the piece as an "important" work.
