= Rusty Air in Carolina =

Rusty Air in Carolina is a symphonic poem for electronica and orchestra by the American composer Mason Bates. The work was commissioned by conductor Robert Moody, a longtime friend and collaborator of Bates. It was premiered in 2006 by Robert Moody and the Winston-Salem Symphony. The piece was composed as a homage to the culture and climate of the Carolinas.

== Composition ==
=== Style and inspiration ===
Rusty Air in Carolina was the first work conductor Robert Moody commissioned as music director for the Winston-Salem Symphony. Bates wrote in the score program notes, "When Bob took the helm at The Winston-Salem Symphony recently and asked if I might write a new piece for him, perhaps his own return to the Carolinas[-]inspired Rusty Air. Though he travels the world, he's a Greenville boy." Bates, a native Virginian and longtime friend of Moody, had spent a summer in the Carolinas in his youth and reflected that "memories are so vivid from that summer in Brevard, North Carolina - that some sort of hommage seemed necessary". Bates integrated the sounds of katydids and cicadas into the music through the use of live-performed electronica in addition to the traditional orchestra.

=== Structure ===
Rusty Air in Carolina has a duration of roughly 13 minutes and is composed in four connected movements:

1. Nan's Porch
2. Katydid Country
3. Southern Midnight
4. Southern Dawn

=== Instrumentation ===
The original arrangement of the work is scored electronica and orchestra, comprising two flutes (2nd doubling piccolo), two oboes (2nd doubling English horn), two clarinets (2nd doubling bass clarinet), two bassoons (2nd doubling contrabassoon), four horns, three trumpets, two trombones, bass trombone, tuba, three percussionists, timpani (doubling long drum), harp, piano, and strings.

Bates later arranged the piece for wind ensemble. This version of the work is scored for four flutes (all doubling piccolo; alternately, flute 3-4 double piccolo), two oboes (2nd doubling English horn), two bassoons, contrabassoon, E-flat clarinet, four B-flat clarinets, bass clarinet, soprano saxophone, alto saxophone, two tenor saxophones, baritone saxophone, four horns, three trumpets, two trombones, bass trombone, euphonium, tuba, electronica, three percussionists, harp, piano, and double bass.

== Reception ==
Elizabeth Bloom of the Pittsburgh Post-Gazette called it "a funky work" and said, "The piece develops a firm skeleton through a varied musical language." Bloom continued, "The concept of using modern technology to depict the natural environment is an interesting one, and the piece's character ranges from bluesy to beautiful, the latter evident in lovely passage-work for strings and horns."
