= Desert Transport =

Musical poem

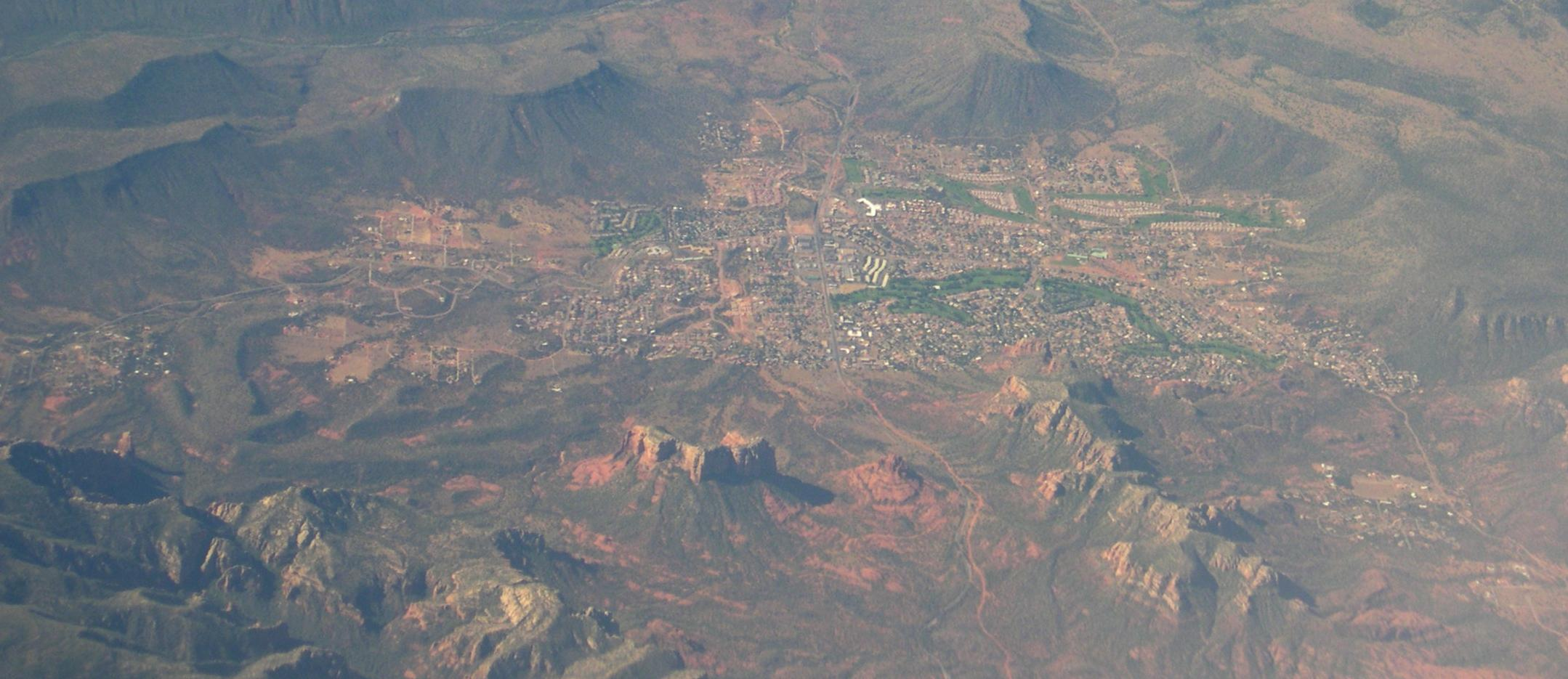
Desert Transport was inspired a helicopter flight over the Arizona landscape, including Montezuma Castle and Sedona.

Desert Transport is a symphonic poem by the American composer Mason Bates. The work was commissioned by the Arizona Music Festival and was completed in 2010. It was premiered in February 2011 by the Arizona Music Festival Orchestra under conductor Robert Moody.

== Composition ==
Desert Transport is composed in a single movement and has a duration of roughly 13 minutes. The piece was inspired by a helicopter flight over the Arizona landscape. In the score program notes, Bates described the work as "combin[ing] mechanistic rhythmic figuration and expansive desert sonorities."

=== Instrumentation ===
The work is scored for an orchestra comprising three flutes (all doubling piccolo), three oboes (3rd doubling English horn), three clarinets (3rd doubling E♭ clarinet), two bassoons, contrabassoon, four horns, three trumpets, two trombones, bass trombone, tuba, three percussionists, timpani, harp, piano, and strings.

== Reception ==
Reviewing the world premiere, Richard Nilsen of The Arizona Republic wrote, "The music, lasting a short and pleasant quarter-hour, takes us on a sonic helicopter ride over Sedona and Montezuma Castle. It is not the best piece Bates ever wrote, but it was a crowd pleaser." Mark Kanny of the Pittsburgh Tribune-Review described the composition as "accessible music full of creativity on many dimensions — from sonority to inventive developments within his thematic material." Andrew Druckenbrod of the Pittsburgh Post-Gazette lauded, "Although it includes a recording of Pima Indian song in the last movement, the work is devoid of Mr. Bates' usual electronica but none of his characteristic imagination." He continued:

Desert Transport begins with the orchestra alluding to the rotors of the helicopter slowly turning before depicting the arid landscape, with its famed red rocks, seen from above. Bold brass, nuanced percussion and warm strings tell the story through sonic texture instead of melody. But as the copter neared Montezuma's Castle — the famed cliff dwelling — what was meant to be representative became poetic. The field recording of the Native American chant was accompanied by shakes and drums that audibly mirrored the helicopter's spinning rotors. Or maybe it was the other way around: a re-hearing that connected the past to the present, and nature to machine, in a profound way.
