= Icarian Rhapsody =

Single-movement orchestra by Mason Bates

The Icarian Rhapsody is a single-movement composition for string orchestra by the American composer Mason Bates. It was composed in 1999 and was first performed November 14, 2003 by the Oakland East Bay Symphony under conductor Michael Morgan.

== Composition ==
The Icarian Rhapsody has a duration of roughly 12 minutes and is composed in one continuous movement. The title of the work is inspired by the character Icarus from Greek mythology. Bates wrote about this inspiration in the score program notes:

The title of this work alludes to its rhapsodic and lyrical essence, the seed out of which grows the entire piece, but also to its fundamental metamorphosis. The mythological character of Icarus, after all, soars so close to the sun that his wax wings melt, plunging him into the sea. While not a meditation on high hopes shattered, the piece shares a similarity to Icarus' trajectory: moving from the ground to the air, then falling (if quite gently) back to earth.

== Reception ==
Reviewing the world premiere, Joshua Kosman of the San Francisco Chronicle described the Icarian Rhapsody as "an appealingly crafted work for strings" and called it "lovely to hear and ingeniously constructed, even if the actual thematic material seemed a little thin." In 2013, Charles T. Downey of The Washington Post also described the piece favorably, saying, "sonic and rhythmic effects were piled up by minimalistic repetition until the voyage finally dissolved in a few wispy contrails of harmonics." Aaron Keebaugh of the Boston Classical Review similarly called it "a kaleidoscope of effects" and wrote:

Pizzicato notes rise from the basses though the cellos and then take off into bowed sweeping passages in the violas. [...] violins, over head, continued the persistent swirl of cross-cutting arpeggios and melodic fragments. The music pulses continuously leaving no room to breathe, but the Criers supplied sharp focus throughout.
