= The B-Sides (composition) =

2009 symphony composed by Mason Bates

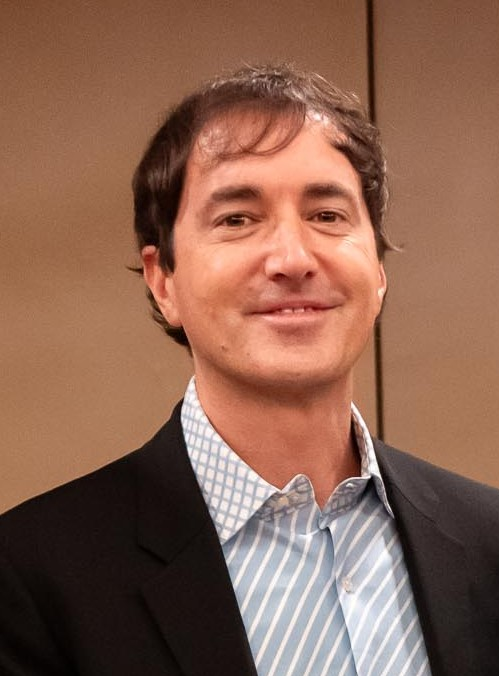
Mason Bates

The B-Sides is a symphony in five movements for electronica and orchestra by the American composer Mason Bates. The work was commissioned by the San Francisco Symphony and conductor Michael Tilson Thomas (to whom the piece is dedicated), with support from the Ralph I. Dorfman Commissioning Fund. It was premiered May 20, 2009, at the Louise M. Davies Symphony Hall in San Francisco, with Michael Tilson Thomas leading the San Francisco Symphony.

== Composition ==
=== Background and inspiration ===
Conductor Michael Tilson Thomas first approached Bates about the commission during a concert intermission between performances of Tchaikovsky and Brahms. Bates wrote:

Fresh off the podium after the concerto, and apparently undistracted by the looming symphony in the second half, he suggested a collection of five pieces focusing on texture and sonority — perhaps like Schoenberg's Five Pieces for Orchestra. Since my music had largely gone in the other direction — large works that bathed the listener in immersive experiences — the idea intrigued me. I had often imagined a suite of concise, off-kilter symphonic pieces that would incorporate the grooves and theatrics of electronica in a highly focused manner. So, like the forgotten bands from the flipside of an old piece of vinyl, The B-Sides offers brief landings on a variety of peculiar planets, unified by a focus on fluorescent orchestral sonorities and the morphing rhythms of electronica.

=== Structure ===
The work has a duration of roughly 22 minutes and is composed in five movements:

1. Broom of the System
2. Aerosol Melody (Hanalei)
3. Gemini in the Solar Wind
4. Temescal Noir
5. Warehouse Medicine

=== Instrumentation ===
The B-Sides is scored for electronica and orchestra, comprising two flutes (1st doubling piccolo), two oboes (2nd doubling English horn), E♭ clarinet (doubling bass clarinet), two clarinets (2nd doubling bass clarinet), two bassoons, contrabassoon, four French horns, three trumpets, two trombones, bass trombone, tuba, three percussionists, harp, piano, strings.

== Reception ==
The B-Sides has received mostly positive responses from critics. Joshua Kosman of the San Francisco Chronicle lauded the piece, writing:

...one of the great virtues of The B-Sides is that the electronics are rarely the point of the exercise, any more than the inclusion of massed brass or a wind machine is the point of a Richard Strauss tone poem. Rather, the electronic beats - cannily shaped and finessed during performance by the composer, hunched over his laptop in the back of the percussion section - become one of many resources in his orchestral palette.

Despite expressing misgivings for Bates's "rather self-consciously hip" style, Lawrence A. Johnson of the Chicago Classical Review called the symphony "much more substantial" and remarked, "Scored for large orchestra, The B-Sides shows that, despite his reputation as a composer whose music is dominated by rhythmic pop influences, Bates is at his finest and most convincing as a symphonic colorist working with a wide palette." Richard Scheinin of the San Jose Mercury News wrote:

An artful orchestrator and schemer — he knows how to move, stealthily, from A to Z and back — his works drip with delicate atmospherics while prowling through beats and weaving warm harmonies and some convincing melodies into the spaced-out tapestry. All of that is true of The B-Sides, as is this: It's often hard to tell where Bates' purely acoustic sounds end and where his electronica begins; he is that skillful an integrator of his materials.
