= Internet Symphony No. 1 =

Symphony YouTube video

The Internet Symphony No. 1 - "Eroica", is a piece written by the Chinese composer Tan Dun for the YouTube Symphony Orchestra. It was the first of such events where musicians around the world play the same piece virtually via the internet, and the best performers selected were arranged into an internet symphony orchestra, featured on YouTube. In addition to submitting a performance of the Internet Symphony No.1 ("Eroica"), musicians were also allowed to submit a video of themselves playing one of the other selected pieces. The best performers were invited to play at New York City's Carnegie Hall on April 15, 2009, with all expenses paid by YouTube. Winners were decided by the most votes cast by YouTube users.

The symphony was 4 minutes and 3 seconds long, the orchestra was commissioned by Google/YouTube and the work was published by G. Schirmer Inc.. It was performed by the London Symphony Orchestra on 6 October 2008. Unconventionally, Tan Dun has included disc brakes and rims from automobiles as additional instruments. Tan also embedded a main theme from the first movement of Beethoven's Eroica Symphony, into his work.

The Hong Kong Chinese Orchestra, as a partner of the YouTube Symphony Orchestra Project, has created a Chinese orchestral version of Tan's Internet Symphony No.1, using the percussion instruments of the Beijing opera and Chinese instruments like bianzhong and guqin. It was rearranged by HKCO's Associate Conductor Chew Hee-Chiat, and conducted by Artistic Director and Principal Conductor Yan Huichang on the YouTube channel. The live premiere of the piece was held in January 2010 at Hong Kong City Hall, conducted by Tan Dun himself.
