= Donald Palumbo =

American opera chorus master

Donald Palumbo is an American choral conductor and vocal coach. He is the former chorus master of the Metropolitan Opera based in New York City and a member of the Vocal Arts faculty at the Juilliard School.

Palumbo is from Rochester, New York and graduated from Boston University with a BA in chemistry (1970). He did not attend a conservatoire but learned his skills by singing in opera choruses in Austria under conductors including Herbert von Karajan and Karl Böhm, accompanying opera rehearsals on the piano, and working with other chorus masters: "every time I had the opportunity to do something — say, play rehearsals for a small opera company or prepare a small chorus for a regional opera company — I just said, 'Yes, I'll be glad to do that.' " He was assistant to the Robert Benaglio, chorus master at La Scala, and has been chorus master at Opera Theatre of Saint Louis and the Dallas Opera. He was music director of the Boston Chorus pro Musica from 1980 to 1990.

From 1991 to 2007 Palumbo was chorus master of the Lyric Opera of Chicago. In 1999 Palumbo was the first American to be appointed chorus director of the Salzburg Festival. In autumn 2007 he was appointed chorus master of the Metropolitan Opera of New York, in which capacity he prepared the chorus for some 25 productions each year. When his appointment was announced in 2006, Peter Gelb, the opera's general manager, said: "Donald Palumbo is widely regarded as the greatest chorus conductor in the world today".

He is a seven time Grammy winner for his recordings with the Metropolitan Opera.

Since 2014 he has also been the vocal coach for the apprentices of the Santa Fe Opera, and he works with young artists at the Glimmerglass Festival.

In 2016 he was appointed to the faculty of the Juilliard School's Marcus Institute for Vocal Arts.

Palumbo retired from the Metropolitan Opera in June 2024, after 17 years with the institution. He and his husband, John Hauser, split their time between homes in Santa Fe, New Mexico and Wildwood Crest, New Jersey.

On June 3, 2025, Palumbo was named as the next director of the Chicago Symphony Chorus, beginning July 1, 2025.
