= The Rise of Exotic Computing =

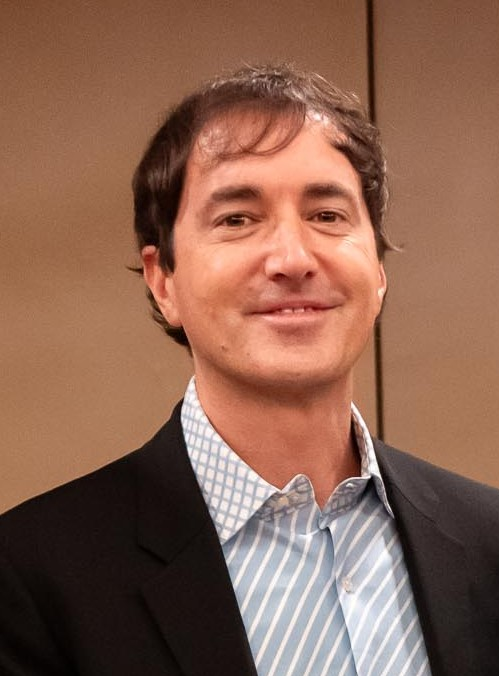
Mason Bates

The Rise of Exotic Computing is a composition for sinfonietta and electronica by the American composer Mason Bates. The work was commissioned by the Pittsburgh Symphony Orchestra and was premiered by the orchestra April 5, 2013.

== Composition ==
The Rise of Exotic Computing is composed in a single movement and has a duration of roughly 12 minutes. The music critic Mark Kanny wrote, "The piece was inspired by the idea of synthetic computing – computers generating their own ideas."

=== Instrumentation ===
The work is scored for electronica and a sinfonietta comprising flute, oboe, clarinet, bassoon, French horn, trumpet, percussion, harp, piano, two violins, viola, cello, and double bass.

== Reception ==
Mark Kanny of the Pittsburgh Tribune-Review lauded the piece, writing, "Bates runs with it by using short motifs, which jump from instrument to instrument. Some ideas bring minimalism to mind, but Bates' musical thinking is far more playful and engaging." John von Rhein of the Chicago Tribune wrote:

[The Rise of Exotic Computing] is self-replicating computer code translated into the composer's familiar musical grammar – funky, techno-laced rhythmic energy jumping from instrument to instrument like an unstoppable force with an impish streak. There isn't much here that the composer hasn't given us before, but that's not to say the work isn't a joyous, thoroughly enjoyable blast to experience, which it is.

Conversely, Elizabeth Bloom of the Pittsburgh Post-Gazette was more critical of the work, calling it a "repetitive, thin piece" that "did not translate well in the concert hall." Lawrence A. Johnson of the Chicago Classical Review similarly admonished, "Overscored and overamped, I found Exotic Computing empty, noisy, and something of a scam."
