= Mothership (composition) =

Single-movement composition

Mothership is a single-movement composition for orchestra and electronica by the American composer Mason Bates. The piece received its world premiere March 20, 2011 at the Sydney Opera House by the YouTube Symphony Orchestra under Michael Tilson Thomas, with featured improvisatorial soloists Paulo Calligopoulos on electric guitar, Ali Bello on violin, Su Chang on zheng, and John Burgess on bass guitar. The premiere was broadcast live on YouTube and garnered nearly two million viewers.

== Composition ==
Bates discussed the composition in the score program notes, writing, "This energetic opener imagines the orchestra as a mothership that is ‘docked’ by several visiting soloists, who offer brief but virtuosic riffs on the work's thematic material over action-packed electro-acoustic orchestral figuration." He continued:

The piece follows the form of a scherzo with double trio (as found in, for example, the Schumann Symphony No. 2). Symphonic scherzos historically play with dance rhythms in a high-energy and appealing manner, with the ‘trio’ sections temporarily exploring new rhythmic areas. Mothership shares a formal connection with the symphonic scherzo but is brought to life by thrilling sounds of the 21st Century — the rhythms of modern-day techno in place of waltz rhythms, for example.

=== Instrumentation ===
The original orchestral arrangement of Mothership is scored for three flutes (3rd doubling piccolo), E-flat clarinet, two clarinets (both doubling bass clarinet), three oboes (3rd doubling English horn), two bassoons, contrabassoon, four French horns, three trumpets, two trombones, bass trombone, tuba, three percussionists, laptop, timpani, harp, piano, and strings.

A subsequent wind ensemble arrangement of the piece by Bates is scored for four flutes (1st and 2nd doubling piccolo), two oboes (2nd doubling English horn), two bassoons, contrabassoon, E-flat clarinet, four clarinets, two bass clarinets, soprano saxophone, alto saxophone, tenor saxophone, baritone saxophone, four C trumpets, four French horns, two trombones, bass trombone, euphonium, tuba, harp, piano, four percussionists, launch pad, timpani, and double bass.

== Reception ==
Andrew Druckenbrod of the Pittsburgh Post-Gazette conceded that the piece is likely not Bates's best work, but that "it showcases the orchestra's ability to be inclusive." Druckenbrod added, "Mothership is fun, and there is nothing wrong with that!"
