= The Auditorium, Melbourne =

Edwardian building at 167–173 Collins Street, Melbourne

Coordinates: 37.815°S 144.968°E

The Auditorium was an eight-storey Edwardian building at 167–173 Collins Street, Melbourne, between Swanston and Russell streets, named for its great hall, which was intended for concerts, but was mostly used as a cinema.

== The building ==
Some Melbourne theatres of early 1900s
1 Central Hall, Little Collins Street
2 The Auditorium
3 Queen's Hall

The Auditorium was a tall building with a red brick facade, designed by Nahum Barnet and constructed by Clements Langford Pty. Ltd., one of Melbourne's leading builders, in 1912. Their client was the Melbourne Presbyterian Church, owners of the land, on which St Enoch's Church had once stood. The church had their offices at the Assembly Hall on the other side of Collins Street.

== The concert hall ==
The Auditorium was designed primarily for concerts, and was developed by theatre impresarios J. & N. Tait, and was located behind the eight-storey office building, with a separate entry from the street, an arrangement similar to its namesake, the Auditorium Building in Chicago. The sparely finished concert hall seated 2000 in the stalls, a 'grand tier', and a balcony. It opened on 17 May 1913, with a performance by the renowned soprano Clara Butt. The Auditorium was not a great success; and as early as 1915 it was showing motion pictures.

== Later history ==
The concert hall was remodelled as the Metro Theatre for MGM, being fully gutted in February 1934, rebuilt in sumptuous style, and opened on 27 April 1934, having taken ten weeks to complete. The manager for MGM was Bert Cowen, who had been manager at The Auditorium when it screened the MGM film The White Sister in 1925.

It was renamed Mayfair Theatre in 1975 when taken over by Greater Union, and finally closed in 1982.

In 1985, the interior was completely remodelled around a central dome housing numerous high end boutiques and named "Figgins Diorama". The venture was not successful, closing after 19 months. The space then reopened briefly as the ‘Shop of Shops’ before closing again. The corner theatre space remained unused, while the office block remained as low rental spaces.

Finally, in 2010, everything but the facade was demolished, and a 17-level premium-grade office building was built, with BHP as the major tenant, completed in 2013. The facade was restored, and remains listed by Heritage Victoria.
