= Robert E. Lee Hotel (St. Louis, Missouri) =

- U.S. National Register of Historic Places
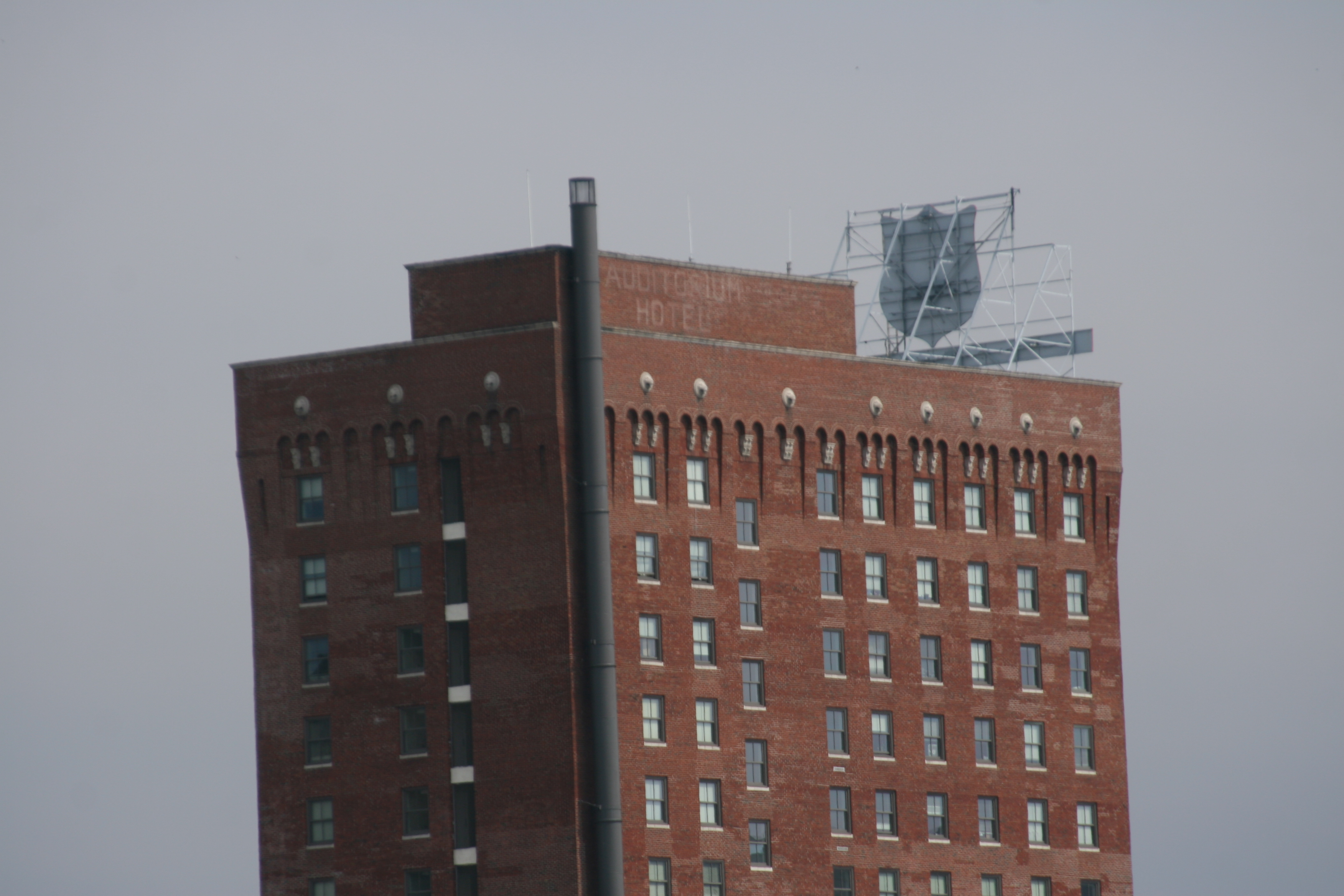
- Building in 2013

- Location within St. Louis Location within Missouri Location within the United States
- Location: 205 N. 18th St., St. Louis, Missouri
- Coordinates: 38.6309°N 90.2060°W
- Built: 1927-28
- Architect: Alonzo H. Gentry
- Architectural style: Romanesque
- NRHP reference No.: 07000021
- Added to NRHP: February 7, 2007

Robert E. Lee Hotel in St. Louis, Missouri, also known as Auditorium Hotel, Evangeline Home, or Railton Residence, is a Romanesque style building. It was listed on the National Register of Historic Places in 2007.

It was designed in 1927 by architect Alonzo H. Gentry and was built during 1927–28. It is a 14-story building with a cast concrete structural framework and red brick walls.

It was originally opened as the Robert E. Hotel. Purchased by the Salvation Army in 1939 for $1.

Later, as Evangeline Booth Home, it provided housing for wives separated from their husbands in active duty in the military during World War II.

Named the "Railton Residence" in the 1970s and provided low-income housing.

Closed in 2008 for renovations.

Its renovation was completed in 2010 and since then it has served as a Salvation Army residence.
