= Quatre études (Stravinsky) =

Collection of orchestral works by Igor Stravinsky

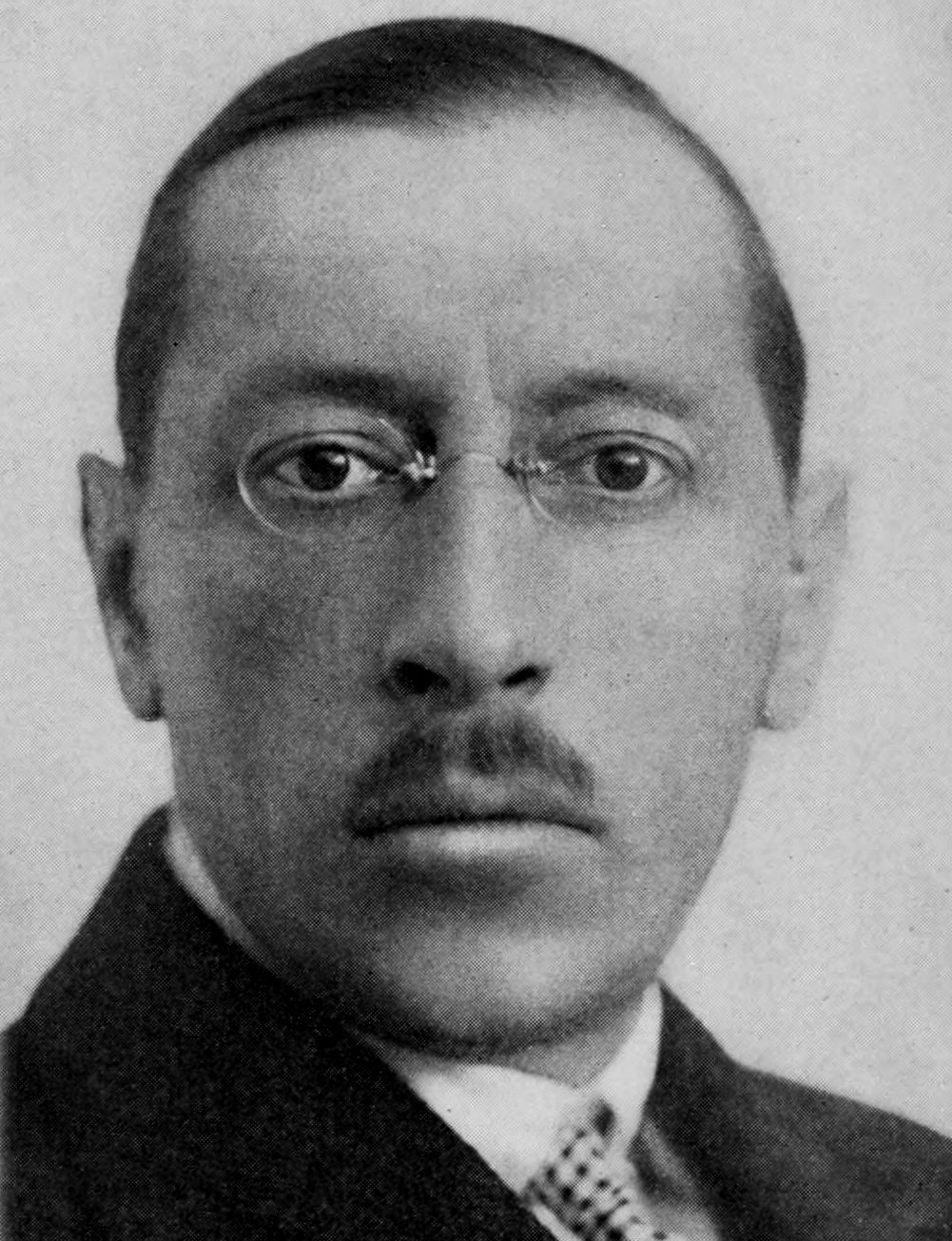
Igor Stravinsky in 1921

Quatre études, pour orchestre (English: Four Studies, for Orchestra) is a collection of arrangements of works by Russian composer Igor Stravinsky. This composition was finished in 1928 and premiered in Berlin in 1930 by Ernest Ansermet. It was revised afterwards in 1952.

== Structure ==
This composition is an arrangement for orchestra of two of Stravinsky's previous works: Three Pieces for String Quartet (1914) and Étude pour pianola (1921). The movements are placed in this order and all titles were changed. A typical performance of this work lasts nine minutes. The movement list is as follows:

1. Danse (Dance). Con moto
2. "Excentrique" (Eccentric). Moderato
3. "Cantique" (Canticle). Largo
4. "Madrid". Allegro con moto.

== Notable recordings ==
Notable recordings of this composition include:

Orchestra	Conductor	Record Company	Year of Recording	Format
Chicago Symphony Orchestra	Pierre Boulez	Deutsche Grammophon	1993	CD
