= Jay Friedman =

American musician

Jay Friedman (born April 11, 1939) is an American trombonist who was principal trombone with the Chicago Symphony Orchestra for 63 years.

== Early life and education ==
Born in Chicago in 1939, Friedman attended high school in Chicago. Friedman attended Yale University on a scholarship and later majored in composition at Roosevelt University.

== Chicago Symphony Orchestra ==
Friedman was appointed assistant principal trombone by Fritz Reiner and two years later was appointed principal trombone by Jean Martinon. When appointed principal in 1964, he was the youngest brass player to take the first chair in a major orchestra. Prior to joining the Chicago Symphony Orchestra, Friedman was principal trombone with the Florida Symphony Orchestra for two years and four years with the Civic Orchestra of Chicago. On August 15, 2025, the Chicago Symphony Orchestra announced that Friedman would retire in September of the same year, following a 63-year tenure with the orchestra. The Chicago Symphony has honored Friedman with its Theodore Thomas Medallion for Distinguished Service.

== Conductor ==
Friedman has also appeared extensively as a conductor, becoming music director of the Symphony of Oak Park and River Forest in 1995, having served as music director of the River Cities Philharmonic, and resident conductor of the Chicago Chamber Orchestra. In 2002, he was named Conductor of the Year by the Illinois Council of Orchestras.

He has appeared as guest conductor of the Chicago Symphony Orchestra, the Orchestra of the Italian Radio (RAI), the Malmö Symphony, the Civic Orchestra of Chicago, and the Santa Cecilia Orchestra of Rome.

== Teacher and educator ==
Friedman is a faculty member of Roosevelt University.
