= Liquid Interface =

2007 symphony composed by Mason Bates

Liquid Interface is a symphony in four movements for electronica and orchestra by the American composer Mason Bates. The work was commissioned by the National Symphony Orchestra and premiered on February 22, 2007, in Washington, D.C., with the orchestra led by conductor Leonard Slatkin. The piece is dedicated to composer John Corigliano.

== Composition ==
=== Style and inspiration ===
Bates first drew inspiration for the symphony from bodies of water. Bates detailed this inception in the score program notes, writing:

Water has influenced countless musical endeavors - La Mer and Siegfried's Rhine Journey quickly come to mind - but it was only after living on Berlin's enormous Lake Wannsee did I become consumed with a new take on the idea. Over the course of barely two months, I watched this huge body of water transform from an ice sheet thick enough to support sausage venders, to a refreshing swimming destination heavy with humidity. If the play of the waves inspired Debussy, then what about water in its variety of forms?

The form of Liquid Interface thus follows the progression of water in a world of increasing global warming. The third movement "Crescent City" also features a musical tribute to the city of New Orleans through the use of Dixieland swing.

=== Structure ===
Liquid Interface has a duration of roughly 25 minutes and is composed in four movements:

1. Glaciers Calving
2. Scherzo Liquido
3. Crescent City
4. On the Wannsee

=== Instrumentation ===
Liquid Interface is scored for electronica and orchestra, comprising three flutes (all doubling piccolo), three oboes (3rd doubling English horn), three clarinets (3rd doubling bass clarinet and E♭ clarinet), three bassoons (3rd doubling contrabassoon), four French horns, three trumpets, two tenor trombones, bass trombone, tuba, three percussionists, harp, piano, and strings.

== Reception ==
Reviewing the world premiere, Andrew Lindemann Malone of The Washington Post lauded the work, saying it "surpassed in sheer sonic beauty even the works by Mendelssohn and Tchaikovsky that rounded out the program." Malone further remarked:

Using a truly gigantic orchestra — the program listed a huge battery of woodwinds and 17 types of percussion, not counting the laptop — Bates renders these scenes primarily with tone colors: humid clouds of strings tinged with brass, rising from the calved glaciers; a sprawling spray of pointillist squiggles for the droplets; and a glorious haze coming from the Wannsee that felt unreal in the best sense.

Joshua Kosman of the San Francisco Chronicle wrote, "the electronic parts of Liquid Interface are simultaneously noteworthy and yet not really the point of the exercise. They are, rather, one additional resource among many that Bates uses in service of a cogent and beautiful musical narrative." Margaret Sandresky of the Winston-Salem Journal said, "Aside from the wide variety of electronic sound, his orchestration of the piece was dazzling." John von Rhein of the Chicago Tribune also praised the piece, remarking:

The electronica ranges from actual sounds of calving Antarctic glaciers and creaking ships' masts to percussive beats and synthesized snaps, crackles, pops and trip-hop rhythms that fan out over the orchestra like monstrous ocean waves. The music goes down easily, rather too easily as far as I was concerned. [...] But it drew a tight, well organized performance from Thursday's performers and whoops of delight from the audience.
