= The Auditorium (Geneva, Nebraska) =

- U.S. National Register of Historic Places
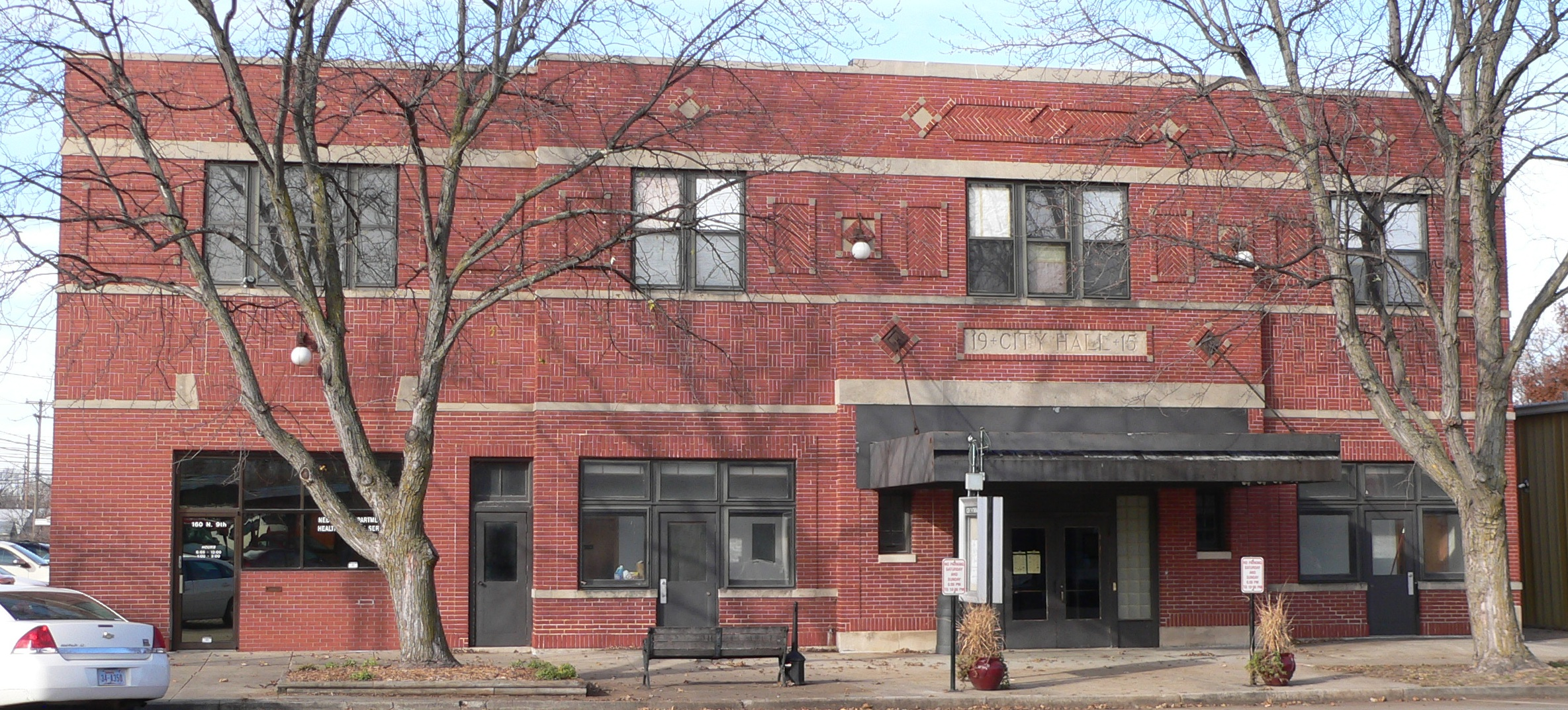
- The building in 2009

- Location within Nebraska Location within the United States
- Location: 160 North Ninth, Geneva, Nebraska
- Coordinates: 40°31′36″N 97°36′10″W
- Area: less than one acre
- Built: 1915
- Architectural style: Two-part commercial block
- MPS: Opera House Buildings in Nebraska 1867-1917 MPS
- NRHP reference No.: 88000950
- Added to NRHP: September 28, 1988

The Auditorium in Geneva, Nebraska is a historic two-story building holding a 63 by 54 feet (19 m × 16 m) auditorium. It was built with red bricks in 1915 as a city hall and auditorium. It was listed on the National Register of Historic Places in 1988.
