= Sasha Cooke =

American mezzo-soprano

Cooke in 2025

Sasha Cooke (born 1982/1983) is an American mezzo-soprano.

== Biography ==
Cooke was born in Riverside, California, and grew up in College Station, Texas, where her parents are professors of Russian at Texas A&M University. She earned a bachelor's degree from Rice University and trained at the Juilliard School in New York. Cooke attended the Music Academy of the West in 2002.

Cooke won best opera recording for Doctor Atomic at the 54th Annual Grammy Awards, 2011, and again for The (R)evolution of Steve Jobs at the 61st Annual Grammy Awards, 2018. Her 2022 album How do I find you? was nominated for Best Classical Solo Vocal Album at the 65th Annual Grammy Awards.

In 2022, she played Thirza in Houston Grand Opera's staging of The Wreckers by Ethel Smyth.
