= Chautauqua Auditorium =

Chautauqua Auditorium may refer to

- Chautauqua Auditorium (Boulder, Colorado)
- Chautauqua Auditorium (Shelbyville, Illinois)
- Chautauqua Auditorium (Waxahachie, Texas)
