= Chicago Symphony Chorus =

Chorus trained by Chicago Symphony Orchestra

The Chicago Symphony Chorus began on September 22, 1957, when the Chicago Symphony Orchestra (CSO) announced that Margaret Hillis would organize and train a symphony chorus. The music director Fritz Reiner's original intent was to utilize the chorus for the two weeks of subscription concerts that season, performing George Frideric Handel's Messiah in December and Giuseppe Verdi's Requiem in April. When Bruno Walter informed the orchestra's management that his March 1958 appearances would be his last in Chicago, the board president, Eric Oldberg, insisted that Walter conduct Wolfgang Amadeus Mozart's Requiem utilizing the new chorus. During that first season, it was logistically impossible for Hillis to audition and prepare a new Chorus for three major works within less than four months. As an interim fix, the Apollo Chorus of Chicago was used for the Christmas Messiah concerts.

== History ==
The Chicago Symphony Chorus gave its informal debut at a private concert for donors on November 30, 1957. Reiner conducted the first half of the concert and Hillis took the podium for the second half, becoming the first woman to conduct the Chicago Symphony Orchestra. She led the orchestra and chorus in the final section of Henry Purcell's Ode for Saint Cecilia’s Day, Randall Thompson's Alleluia and William Billings's Modern Music, and the "Servants' Chorus" from Gaetano Donizetti’s Don Pasquale.

Eighty-one-year-old Bruno Walter led the chorus in its official debut concerts at Orchestra Hall on March 13 and 14, 1958, a performance of Mozart's Requiem. A few weeks later, on April 3, 4, and 8, 1958, Reiner himself led the chorus for the first time in a performance of Verdi's Requiem.

The chorus made its first commercial recording for RCA — Sergei Prokofiev’s Alexander Nevsky - on March 7, 1959, with Fritz Reiner conducting the orchestra. The chorus made its Ravinia Festival debut on July 9, 1960, a performance of Gustav Mahler's Symphony No. 2 (Resurrection) conducted by the CSO's associate conductor and Ravinia Festival artistic director Walter Hendl. The chorus had its first Carnegie Hall appearance on November 12, 1967, singing Hans Werner Henze's The Sicilian Muses and Maurice Ravel's Daphnis and Chloe with Jean Martinon conducting.

The chorus' first tour with the orchestra was to London and Salzburg in August 1989. They performed Hector Berlioz's The Damnation of Faust with Sir Georg Solti conducting. Ten years later, the ensemble won critical acclaim for its performances of Arnold Schoenberg's Moses und Aron under Pierre Boulez, and Johannes Brahms's A German Requiem under Daniel Barenboim while performing at the Berlin Festtage in April 1999.

Chicago Symphony Orchestra recordings featuring the chorus have won ten Grammy Awards from the National Academy of Recording Arts and Sciences for best choral performance. These recordings include hallmarks of the choral repertoire, ranging from Ludwig van Beethoven's Missa solemnis to Johann Sebastian Bach's Mass in B Minor, and two recordings each of Brahms's A German Requiem and Verdi's Requiem. Women of the chorus (prepared by Duain Wolfe) appeared on the recording of Mahler's Symphony No. 3 led by the CSO's principal conductor Bernard Haitink. The recording was released in May 2007, as the first recording on the orchestra's own label, CSO Resound.

Margaret Hillis led the chorus as director for 37 years and retired in 1994. Duain Wolfe became the chorus's second director in June 1994. He retired from this position at the end of February 2022. In July 2025, Donald Palumbo became the chorus's third director.

== Chorus directors ==
- Margaret Hillis (1958–1994)
- Duain Wolfe (1994–2022)
- Donald Palumbo (2025–present)

== Honors and awards ==
Grammy Award for Best Choral Performance

- 1977 - Sir Georg Solti, conductor and Margaret Hillis, chorus director: VERDI Requiem
- 1978 - Sir Georg Solti, conductor and Margaret Hillis, chorus director: BEETHOVEN Missa solemnis
- 1979 - Sir Georg Solti, conductor and Margaret Hillis, chorus director: BRAHMS A German Requiem
- 1982 - Sir Georg Solti, conductor and Margaret Hillis, chorus director: BERLIOZ The Damnation of Faust
- 1983 - Sir Georg Solti, conductor and Margaret Hillis, chorus director: HAYDN The Creation
- 1984 - James Levine, conductor and Margaret Hillis, chorus director: BRAHMS A German Requiem
- 1986 - James Levine, conductor and Margaret Hillis, chorus director: ORFF Carmina Burana
- 1991 - Sir Georg Solti, conductor and Margaret Hillis, chorus director: BACH Mass in B Minor, BWV 232
- 1993 - Pierre Boulez, conductor and Margaret Hillis, chorus director: BARTÓK Cantata profana
- 2010 - Riccardo Muti, conductor and Duain Wolfe, chorus director: VERDI Messa da Requiem
