= La Porte Civic Auditorium =

Multi-purpose auditorium in La Porte, Indiana

Coordinates: 41°36′29″N 86°42′44″W

The La Porte Civic Auditorium is an event building located in La Porte, Indiana. Opened in 1930, it has 7,600 square feet of space. It hosts athletic contests, weddings, concerts and stage plays. A few of the well-known artists that have performed at the auditorium include Marion Anderson, Ted Nugent, Alice Cooper, Ace Frehley, Stevie Ray Vaughan, Cheap Trick and Night Ranger.
