= Mason Bates =

American composer (born 1977)

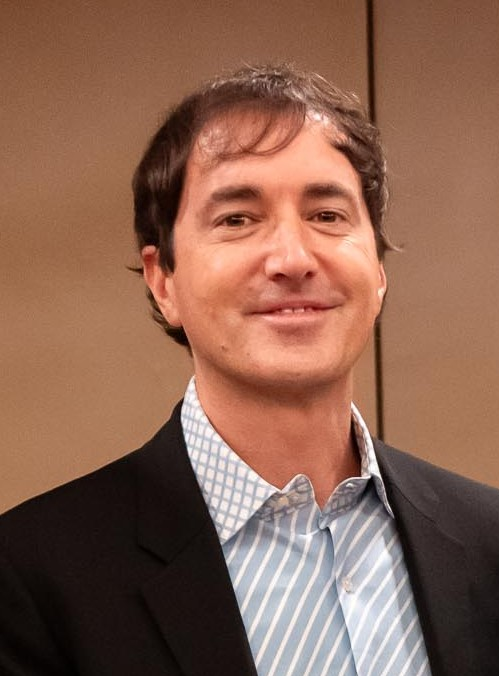
- Born: Mason Wesley Bates; January 23, 1977 (age 49); Philadelphia, Pennsylvania, U.S.
- Education: Juilliard School; Center for New Music and Audio Technologies
- Occupations: Composer; DJ
- Awards: Grammy Awards
- Website: www.masonbates.com

Mason Wesley Bates (born January 23, 1977) is a Grammy award-winning American composer of symphonic music and DJ of electronic dance music. He is the first composer-in-residence of the Kennedy Center, and he has also been in residence with Chicago Symphony Orchestra, the San Francisco Symphony, the Pittsburgh Symphony, and the California Symphony. In addition to his notable works Mothership, Anthology of Fantastic Zoology, and The (R)evolution of Steve Jobs, he composed the score to Gus Van Sant's film The Sea of Trees. In a 2018 survey of American orchestras, he was rated the second-most performed living composer. On September 21, 2025, his opera The Amazing Adventures of Kavalier & Clay opened the Metropolitan Opera's 140th season.

== Life ==
Bates was born in Philadelphia and raised in Richmond, Virginia, and Newtown, Virginia, where his family homestead and farm is located. He exhibited an early interest in creative writing at St. Christopher's School and received a letter from the Mayor of Munich in response to his poem The Village of a Million People, written after a visit to the German city. His earliest choral compositions were conducted by his piano teacher Hope Armstrong Erb, and he studied composition with Dika Newlin, who was a student of Arnold Schoenberg.

During the summer of 1993 at Brevard Music Center, Bates's music caught the attention of conductor Robert Moody, who subsequently commissioned his first symphonic work Free Variations for Orchestra for his orchestra in Evansville, Indiana. Bates subsequently attended the Columbia University-Juilliard School program and earned a Bachelor of Arts in English literature and Master of Music in music composition. He studied music composition with John Corigliano, David Del Tredici, and Samuel Adler, while also studying playwriting with Arnold Weinstein.

In 2001, Bates relocated to the Bay Area and studied under Edmund Campion in the Center for New Music and Audio Technologies at the University of California, Berkeley and graduated in 2008 with a PhD in composition. He worked around that time as a DJ and techno artist under the name Masonic in clubs and lounges of San Francisco. In that year, with conductor Benjamin Shwartz and visual designer Anne Patterson, he founded Mercury Soul, a San Francisco-based non-profit organization that mounts club shows combining classical music and DJ sets in clubs. He concurrently lived in Rome 2003-2004 as the recipient of The Rome Prize from the American Academy in Rome as well as in Berlin in 2005 as recipient of the Berlin Prize from the American Academy in Berlin. In 2014 he joined the Composition faculty of the San Francisco Conservatory of Music. He currently lives in Burlingame, California.

== Career ==
Bates showed an early interest in bridging the worlds of electronic and symphonic music, premiering his Concerto for Synthesizer in 1999 with the Phoenix Symphony and subsequently performing it with the Atlanta Symphony. Robert Moody premiered that work in addition to Rusty Air in Carolina. He gained national attention in 2007 with Liquid Interface, a water symphony commissioned by the National Symphony Orchestra under Leonard Slatkin, who premiered several works by Bates including Violin Concerto for Anne Akiko Meyers.

Bates has spoken about his symphonies as a revival of the narrative symphonies of the 19th century using 21st-century sounds, as exhibited by his 2018 symphony Art of War. The piece "explores the drama of human conflict" using field recordings of mortar and artillery explosions made during two visits to Camp Pendleton, as well as recordings of the printing presses of the US Mint which appear in the work's opening movement "Money as a weapons system".

Some of his works do not include electronic sounds, such as Resurrexit, which was commissioned by Pittsburgh Symphony Orchestra in celebration of Manfred Honeck's 60th birthday. Honeck conducted its premiere in 2018.

A long partnership with the San Francisco Symphony began with the 2009 premiere of The B-Sides under Michael Tilson Thomas, who subsequently conducted several works by Bates with the YouTube Symphony. The latter premiered Mothership at the Sydney Opera House in 2011 to an online audience of two million, and the work has become one of the most-performed orchestral works by a living composer. Michael Tilson Thomas and the San Francisco Symphony recorded three Bates works during the Beethoven & Bates Festival of 2017, earning a Grammy nomination for Best Orchestral Performance. That same year also saw a nomination for Best Contemporary Classical Composition for his Alternative Energy for the Chicago Symphony Orchestra, where Bates was named composer-in-residence from 2010 to 2015.

Film projects began in 2015 with the score for Gus Van Sant's film The Sea of Trees, starring Matthew McConaughey, Naomi Watts and Ken Watanabe.

While gaining national prominence for his electro-acoustic symphonic music, Bates began experimenting with concert format in his curating projects in partnership with institutions such as the Chicago Symphony Orchestra and the Kennedy Center. Through his club show Mercury Soul, Bates became familiar with lighting, production, and staging techniques that create fluid, information-rich environments in social settings. With composer Anna Clyne, Bates expanded the Chicago Symphony's MusicNOW series to include cinematic program notes, immersive production, and pre- and post-concert parties in partnership with the illmeasures DJ collective. After his residency with the CSO, Bates was named the first composer-in-residence of the Kennedy Center in Washington, D.C., where he launched the new-music series KC Jukebox. The series animates venues across the center, pairing classical ensembles and composers with artists outside the field, such as Thievery Corporation and the composers Kyle Dixon and Michael Stein of the Netflix series Stranger Things.

His first opera, The (R)evolution of Steve Jobs, was premiered in 2017 by the Santa Fe Opera, which added a performance to accommodate the high demand after selling out all seven originally scheduled performances. General Director Charles MacKay announced that it was one of the best-selling new works in its history, and Santa Fe Opera's recording on Pentatone Records went on to win the 2019 Grammy® for Best Opera Recording. Co-commissioners include San Francisco Opera, Seattle Opera, and Indiana University. The libretto was written by Mark Campbell.

In 2018, the Metropolitan Opera announced the commission of The Amazing Adventures of Kavalier & Clay, with music by Bates and libretto by Gene Scheer. The opera is based on the Pulitzer Prize-winning novel with the same name by Michael Chabon about a Jewish immigrant who writes comic books to earn enough money to save his family from the Holocaust.

In November 2019, Vulcan Productions announced details about World's Greatest Synth: The Making of the Orchestra (later retitled Philharmonia Fantastique: The Making of the Orchestra), a 25-minute multimedia work integrating film, animation and pre-recorded sound with a live orchestra. It was co-commissioned by the Chicago Symphony Orchestra, San Francisco Symphony, Dallas Symphony Orchestra, Pittsburgh Symphony Orchestra and National Symphony Orchestra. The work is a collaboration between Bates and director and sound designer Gary Rydstrom of Lucasfilm and Skywalker Sound, as well as animator Jim Capobianco of Aerial Contrivance Workshop. Philharmonia Fantastique is a 'guide to the orchestra' with a script by Bates and Rydstrom (the director of the film), and an electro-acoustic symphonic score by Bates. It was set to be premiered by Chicago Symphony Orchestra with guest conductor Edwin Outwater in March 26–28 in 2020, marking the 100th-anniversary celebration of the 1919 founding of the CSO School and Family Matinee Concerts series by Frederick Stock, CSO's second music director. However, the premiere was cancelled as a response to the COVID-19 pandemic. Its West Coast premiere in April 16–18 in the same year by the San Francisco Symphony was postponed for the same reason. The Dallas Symphony Orchestra, Pittsburgh Symphony Orchestra, and National Symphony Orchestra also plan to perform Philharmonia Fantastique in their 2020–21 season, after which it will be made available for rental as a 'film in concert' package.

On September 21, 2025, his opera The Adventures of Kavalier & Clay opened the Met Opera 2025-2026 season.

== Awards ==
- 2019 Grammys Winner Best Opera Recording – The (R)evolution of Steve Jobs
- 2017 Musical America Composer of the Year 2018
- 2012 18th Annual Heinz Award in the Arts and Humanities
- 2008 Guggenheim Fellowship
- 2008 Van Cliburn American Composer Invitational First Prize
- 2006 Creative Capital Award
- 2004 Rome Prize
- 2005 American Academy in Berlin Prize
- Charles Ives scholarship
- American Academy of Arts and Letters fellowship
- Jacob Druckman Memorial Prize from Aspen Music Festival
- Tanglewood Music Center Fellowship

== Composer-in-residence ==
- 2015 Kennedy Center composer-in-residence
- 2012–2013, 2014–2015 Composer of the Year, Pittsburgh Symphony Orchestra
- 2010–2015 Chicago Symphony's Mead composer in residence.
- 2007–2010 Young American composer-in-residence for the California Symphony

== Compositions ==
=== Symphonic works ===
- Silicon Hymnal, for orchestra and electronics (2025)
- Piano Concerto, for Daniil Trifonov (2022)
- Philharmonia Fantastique, for orchestra and animated film (2022)
- Undistant, for orchestra (2021)
- Art of War, for orchestra and electronics (2018)
- Resurrexit, for orchestra (2018)
- Children of Adam, songs of creation for orchestra and chorus (2017)
- Sideman, for band and percussion (2016)
- Auditorium, for orchestra (2016)
- Anthology of Fantastic Zoology, for orchestra (2015)
- Cello Concerto, for cello and orchestra (2014)
- Devil's Radio, for orchestra (2014)
- Garages of the Valley, for orchestra (2014)
- The Rise of Exotic Computing, for sinfonietta and laptop (2013)
- Attack Decay Sustain Release, fanfare for orchestra (2013)
- Violin Concerto, for orchestra and violin (2012)
- Alternative Energy, for orchestra and electronica (2011)
- Mothership, for orchestra and electronica (2011)
- Desert Transport, for orchestra (2010)
- Sea-Blue Circuitry, for orchestra or band (2010)
- Mainframe Tropics, for orchestra (2010)
- The B-Sides, for orchestra and electronica (2009)
- Music from Underground Spaces, for orchestra and electronica (2008)
- Liquid Interface (2007)
- Rusty Air in Carolina, for orchestra and electronica (2006)
- White Lies for Lomax (2009)
- Omnivorous Furniture, for sinfonietta and electronica (2004)
- Ode, prelude to the Beethoven 9th for orchestra (2001)
- Icarian Rhapsody, for string orchestra (1999)
- Nomad Concerto, for solo violin and orchestra (2023)

=== Operatic works ===
- The (R)evolution of Steve Jobs (2017)
- The Amazing Adventures of Kavalier & Clay (2024)

=== Chamber ===
- Shenandoah, for solo violin (2019)
- Carbide and Carbon, for cello ensemble (2013)
- Difficult Bamboo, for Pierrot ensemble and percussion (2013)
- Bagatelles, for string quartet and electronica (2012)
- Stereo is King, for three percussionists and tape (2011)
- The Life of Birds, for flute, clarinet, violin, and cello (2008)
- White Lies for Lomax, for piano solo (2007)
- Red River, for violin, clarinet, cello, piano, and electronics (2007)
- Digital Loom, for organ and electronics (2005)
- From Amber Frozen, for string quartet (2004)
- String Band, for piano trio (2002)
- Mercury Soul, for clarinet and piano (2002)

=== Vocal works ===
- Children of Adam, songs of creation for orchestra and chorus (2018)
- Drum-Taps, for choir (2017)
- Passage, for mezzo-soprano and orchestra (2017)
- Mass Transmission, for organ, electronics, and chorus (2012)
- Observer in a Magellanic Cloud, for chorus (2009)
- Sirens, for 12-part a cappella chorus (2009)

=== Film scores ===
- The Sea of Trees – dir. Gus Van Sant (2016)

== Discography ==
- American Masters – Violin Concerto (Entertainment One Music, 2014)
- Riccardo Muti Conducts Mason Bates and Anna Clyne – Alternative Energy (CSO Resound, 2014)
- Stereo is King (Innova Recordings, 2014)
- Digital Loom'' (MSR Classics, 2009)
- Scrapyard Exotica (Sono Luminus DSL-92193) by Del Sol String Quartet (2015)
- Works for Orchestra (San Francisco Symphony) by San Francisco Symphony (2016)
- Anthology of Fantastic Zoology (CSO Resound) by the Chicago Symphony Orchestra (2016)
- The (R)evolution of Steve Jobs (Pentatone) by Santa Fe Opera (2018)
