= Anthology of Fantastic Zoology =

2015 symphony composed by Mason Bates

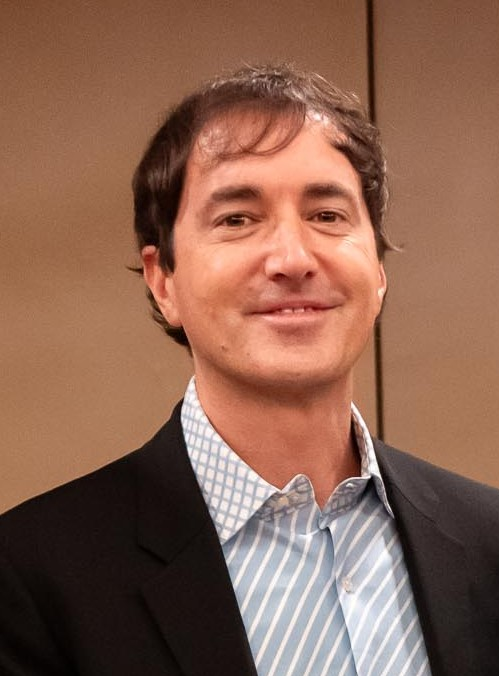
Mason Bates

Anthology of Fantastic Zoology is an orchestral symphony by the American composer Mason Bates. The work was commissioned by the Chicago Symphony Orchestra, for whom Bates was then composer-in-residence. It was premiered June 18, 2015, at Symphony Center in Chicago, with the Chicago Symphony Orchestra performing under conductor Riccardo Muti, to whom the work is dedicated. The piece is based on the eponymous book by Jorge Luis Borges.

== Composition ==
=== Inspiration ===
The movements of the work are titled after mythical creatures from the book Anthology of Fantastic Zoology by Jorge Luis Borges. Bates commented on this inspiration in the score program notes, writing:

A master of magical realism and narrative puzzles, Borges was the perfect writer to create a compendium of mythological creatures. Several are of his own invention. The musical realization of this, a kind of psychedelic Carnival of the Animals, is presented in eleven interlocking movements (a sprawling form inspired by French and Russian ballet scores).

=== Structure ===
The piece has a duration of roughly 30 minutes and is composed in eleven continuous movements:

1. Forest: Twilight
2. Sprite
3. Dusk
4. The A Bao A Qu
5. Nymphs
6. Night
7. The Gryphon
8. Midnight
9. Sirens
10. The Zaratan
11. Madrugada

=== Instrumentation ===
Anthology of Fantastic Zoology is scored for an orchestra comprising three flutes (3rd doubling piccolo), three oboes (3rd doubling English horn), three clarinets (2nd doubling E-flat clarinet and bass clarinet), two bassoons, contrabassoon, four French horns, three trumpets, two trombones, bass trombone, tuba, three percussionists, timpani, harp, piano/celesta, and strings.

== Reception ==
Reviewing the world premiere, Lawrence A. Johnson of the Chicago Classical Review praised the symphony, remarking, "Bates has crafted a kaleidoscopic half-hour work, choosing an array of Borges’ mythical creatures to paint in eleven interstiched sections." Johnson continued, "Dedicated to Muti, Zoology is the 37-year-old composer's largest and most ambitious orchestral work to date, scored for huge forces and massive percussion battery. John von Rhein of the Chicago Tribune also lauded the piece, writing:

At just over 30 minutes, Anthology of Fantastic Zoology is the largest piece Bates has composed to date. A huge percussion battery essentially co-opts the role of electronica, typically a key element of Bates' orchestral arsenal. While individual movement titles reference nymphs, sirens, a sprite and a gryphon, this fantastical menagerie becomes a pretext for a grand, playful, surprising, exuberantly colorful concerto for orchestra, one that pays homage to both the full ensemble and to individual members of that ensemble.

Georgia Rowe of the San Jose Mercury News called the piece "scintillating" and said, "It's a large, panoramic 30-minute score, one that surges with vitality and glistens with alluring orchestral color."
