= Duain Wolfe =

American choral conductor and conductor

A. Duain Wolfe (born 24 October 1945, Hammond, Louisiana) is an American choral conductor, conductor of the Colorado Symphony Chorus and the Colorado Children's Chorale. He is the former chorus director and conductor of the Chicago Symphony Chorus (1994-2022) and a past president of Chorus America.

== Education and early career ==
Alvin Duain Wolfe earned his BM from Southeastern Louisiana University in 1966 and master's degree from the University of North Texas College of Music completing his thesis on Nineteenth-century New Orleans composers, published by the University in 1968.

=== Central City Opera ===
Beginning in the early 1970s, Wolfe served as chorus master and a staff conductor at Central City Opera Festival, working closely with conductor John Moriarty. He also served the organization in various administrative capacities, maintaining a twenty-year relationship with the festival.

=== Colorado Children's Chorale ===
As a conductor at Central City, Wolfe was responsible for establishing a children's choral ensemble for a 1974 production of Benjamin Britten's A Midsummer Night's Dream. With this group of singers he founded the Colorado Children's Chorale, a youth choir based in Denver, Colorado. Under Wolfe's leadership and preparation the group achieved national recognition, appearing on NBC’s Today Show, CBS Christmas specials and BBC broadcasts of The Proms at Royal Albert Hall with the BBC Orchestra and Chorus of Wales. Other performances have included collaborations with Opera Colorado, Colorado Ballet, Opera Omaha, Toledo Opera, the Grand Teton Music Festival and the Aspen Music Festival, where they sang the children's chorus in a 1994 performance of Mahler's Symphony No. 8, in addition to appearances with many famous classical and popular musicians. He retired as Artistic Director of the Colorado Children's Chorale in 1999.

=== Colorado Symphony Chorus ===
In 1984 Wolfe was asked by Denver Symphony Orchestra conductor Gaetano Delogu (later principal conductor of the Prague Symphony Orchestra) to form a symphony chorus. He founded the Colorado Symphony Chorus, which he has led under symphony conductors Delogu, Philippe Entremont, Marin Alsop and Jeffrey Kahane, in addition to other engagements such as the chorus' annual appearances at the Aspen Music Festival.

== Chicago Symphony Chorus ==
In 1994, Wolfe was chosen by music director Daniel Barenboim to succeed Margaret Hillis as director of the Chicago Symphony Chorus. Only the second individual to hold the position, Wolfe has prepared the Chorus for over one hundred performances, including a Grammy Award–winning recording of Wagner’s Die Meistersinger von Nürnberg with Sir Georg Solti in 1998, and a Carnegie Hall performance of Beethoven’s Ninth Symphony with the Staatskapelle Berlin under Barenboim in 2000. Under Wolfe's leadership, the Chicago Symphony Chorus won a 2010 Grammy Award for Best Choral Performance (the ensemble's tenth award in that category since 1977) for Verdi's Messa da Requiem under the baton of music director Riccardo Muti. The recording also won the Grammy Award for Best Classical Album. He retired from this position at the end of February 2022 with a performance of Beethoven's 9th.

== Awards ==
Among his many awards, Wolfe won the 1987 Mayor's Awards for Excellence in the Arts from the City and County of Denver. The Colorado Children's Chorale and Wolfe received a Governor's Arts Award from the Colorado Council on the Arts in 1999. In 2001, Wolfe received a Bonfils-Stanton Foundation Award. The prize is often considered Colorado’s most prestigious prize for accomplishment in the Arts and Humanities, Community Service, and Science and Medicine. In 2012, Chorus America awarded Wolfe the Michael Korn Founders Award for Development of the Professional Choral Art, given annually to a conductor in recognition of "a lifetime of significant contributions to the professional choral art."

== Recent projects ==
In May 2012, he served as chorus master for the Combined Ottawa Choruses in a performance of Verdi's Requiem with the Canadian National Arts Centre Orchestra, under the baton of Pinchas Zukerman. In June 2016, Wolfe returned to Ottawa to conduct the choirs of Ottawa and the NAC orchestra once more in a performance of Mendelssohn's oratorio Elijah.
