= List of musicologists =

A musicologist is someone who studies music (see musicology). A historical musicologist studies music from a historical perspective. An ethnomusicologist studies music in its cultural and social contexts (see ethnomusicology). A systematic musicologist asks general questions about music from the perspective of relevant disciplines (psychology, sociology, acoustics, philosophy, physiology, computer science) (see systematic musicology). Systematic musicologists often identify more strongly with their non-musical discipline than with musicology.

== Historical musicologists ==
- Mário de Andrade
- Carolyn Abbate
- Byron Adams
- Guido Adler
- Miguel Álvarez-Fernández
- August Wilhelm Ambrosjau
- Josip Andreis
- Willi Apel
- Denis Arnold
- Philippe A. Autexier
- Sol Babitz
- Eva Badura-Skoda
- František Bartoš
- Jeanne Behrend
- Margaret Bent
- Heinrich Besseler
- Yael Bitrán
- Peter Bloom
- Jane M. Bowers
- Luisa Lacal de Bracho
- Philip Brett
- Reinhold Brinkmann
- Rae Linda Brown
- Howard Mayer Brown
- Charles Faulkner Bryan
- Elmar Budde
- Michael J. Budds
- Manfred Bukofzer
- J. Peter Burkholder
- Dimitrije Bužarovski
- Roberto Carnevale
- Peter Case
- Federico Celestini
- Samuel Charters
- Richard Charteris
- Antoine-Elisée Cherbuliez
- Friedrich Chrysander
- Charles-Edmond-Henri de Coussemaker
- Ry Cooder
- Dragotin Cvetko
- Ludwig Czaczkes
- Frank D'Accone
- Carl Dahlhaus
- Thurston Dart
- John Daverio
- S. A. K. Durga
- Alfred Einstein
- Alexander John Ellis
- Séamus Ennis
- Fritz Feldmann
- Robert Fink
- Antonio Gallego
- Paul Gambaccini
- Karl Geiringer
- Thrasybulos Georgiades
- Tula Giannini
- Roger Mathew Grant
- Robert Greenberg
- Donald Jay Grout
- Ursula Günther
- Bartol Gyurgieuvits
- Harry Halbreich
- Roger Lee Hall
- Mickey Hart
- Daniel Heartz
- Seppo Heikinheimo
- Sam Henry
- Willy Hess
- Ernst Hilmar
- H. Wiley Hitchcock
- Hans-Jørgen Holman
- Richard Hoppin
- Andrew Hughes
- George Pullen Jackson
- Shruti Jauhari
- Richard Jackson
- Simon P. Keefe
- Thomas Forrest Kelly
- Joseph Kerman
- Otto Kinkeldey
- Jerome Kohl
- Lawrence Kramer
- Franz Krautwurst
- Paul-Gilbert Langevin
- Gavin S. K. Lee
- Kendra Preston Leonard
- Friedrich Lippmann
- Robert Lissauer
- Lewis Lockwood
- John Lomax
- Edward Lowinsky
- Friedrich Ludwig
- Ciarán Mac Mathúna
- Eusebius Mandyczewski
- Maria Rika Maniates
- Guy A. Marco
- Joseph de Marliave
- Susan McClary
- R. C. Mehta
- Otto Mayer-Serra
- Lalmani Misra
- Antal Molnár
- Jérôme-Joseph de Momigny
- Pierre Monichon
- Anthony Newcomb
- Gustav Nottebohm
- Michael Nyman
- Claude V. Palisca
- Dom Joseph Pothier
- André Pirro
- Nino Pirrotta
- Leon B. Plantinga
- Howard Pollack
- Harold Powers
- Michael Praetorius
- N. Ramanathan
- Gustave Reese
- Andrey Rimsky-Korsakov
- Charles Rosen
- Julian Rushton
- Stanley Sadie
- Camille Saint-Saëns
- Adolfo Salazar
- Adrienne Simpson
- Elaine Sisman
- Eileen Southern
- Philipp Spitta
- Hedi Stadlen
- Rita Steblin
- Paul Steinitz
- Reinhard Strohm
- Oliver Strunk
- Carl Stumpf
- Edward Tarr
- Richard Taruskin
- Erik W. Tawaststjerna
- Nicholas Temperley
- Jeff Todd Titon
- Donald Tovey
- Anahit Tsitsikian
- Alan Tyson
- Leo Treitler
- Marc Vignal
- Frank Walker
- James Webster
- Harry White
- John Wilson
- Christoph Wolff
- Josephine Wright
- Neal Zaslaw
- Manuel Veiga
- José Maria Neves
- Piotr Nawrot
- Fernando Lopes-Graça

== Ethnomusicologists ==
- Eduard Yefimovich Alekseyev
- Mário de Andrade
- Jaime de Angulo
- Simha Arom
- Jesús Bal y Gay
- Béla Bartók
- Judith Becker
- Deben Bhattacharya
- John Blacking
- Constantin Brăiloiu
- Mellonee V. Burnim
- Joško Ćaleta
- Joseph Canteloube
- Chalkdust
- Oriana Civile
- Judith R. Cohen
- Frances Densmore
- Joaquin Diaz González
- S. A. K. Durga
- Akin Euba
- John Comfort Fillmore
- Walter Graf
- Percy Grainger
- Ida Halpern
- David G. Hebert
- Mantle Hood
- Erich von Hornbostel
- Leoš Janáček
- Jean Jenkins
- Arthur Morris Jones
- Maud Karpeles
- Margaret J. Kartomi
- Lajos Kiss
- Zoltán Kodály
- Boris Kotlyarov
- Franjo Kuhač
- Jaap Kunst
- Filip Kutev
- Robert Lachmann
- Paul-Gilbert Langevin
- Argeliers León
- Alan Lomax
- John Lomax
- William P. Malm
- Portia K. Maultsby
- David P. McAllester
- Alan P. Merriam
- Pirkko Moisala
- Bruno Nettl
- Mirko Ramovš
- Willard Rhodes
- Joel Rubin
- Wilhelm Rust
- Charles Seeger
- Kay Kaufman Shelemay
- Božidar Širola
- Laura Alexandrine Smith
- Michael Tenzer
- Laxmi Ganesh Tewari
- Anahit Tsitsikian
- Colin Turnbull
- Armas Otto Väisänen
- Richard Widdess
- Vinko Žganec
- Carlos Sandroni
- Kilza Setti

== Systematic musicologists ==
- Theodor W. Adorno
- Aristotle
- Karlheinz Brandenburg
- Albert Bregman
- Michel Chion
- John Chowning
- Nicolas Collins
- Edward T. Cone
- Ivor Darreg
- Dalibor Davidović
- Tia DeNora
- Diana Deutsch
- Renato Fasano
- Gustav Fechner
- François-Joseph Fétis
- Nikša Gligo
- Lydia Goehr
- Hermann von Helmholtz
- Bart Hopkin
- Erich von Hornbostel
- Shuhei Hosokawa
- David Huron
- Vladimír Karbusický
- Ernst Kurth
- Yuri Landman
- Fred Lerdahl
- Heinz von Loesch
- François-Bernard Mâche
- Dario Martinelli
- Helga de la Motte-Haber
- Jean-Jacques Nattiez
- Gabriel Pareyon
- Richard Parncutt
- Harry Partch
- Pythagoras
- Helmut Rösing
- Carl Seashore
- Pierre Schaeffer
- Klaus Scherer
- Alphons Silbermann
- Carl Stumpf
- Eero Tarasti
- Ernst Heinrich Weber
- Erv Wilson
