= Piyal Bhattacharya =

Indian theatre director, dancer, scholar

- Born: Piyal Bhattacharya; Howrah, Howrah, West Bengal, India
- Occupations: Theatre director; scholar; dancer
- Writing career
- Subjects: Sanskrit, Natyashastra Marga Natya

Piyal Bhattacharya is an Indian theatre director and Natyashastra scholar from Kolkata, West Bengal. He is proficient in Sanskrit, English, Bengali, Hindi and Malayalam. He has founded the Spanda Art Space near Garia, Kolkata.

== Life and work ==
Born in Howrah, West Bengal, Piyal Bhattacharya received training in Kathakali under Kalamandalam Balasubramanian at Kerala Kalamandalam. Later, he studied Natyashastra and musicology under Kamlesh Dutt Tripathi, Bharat Gupt, Puru Dadheech, N. Ramanathan, Urmila Sharma and others. He learnt Rudraveena of Dagar Gharana under Suvir Mishra, Asit Banerjee, Bahauddin Dagar, and of Dabir Khan Gharana from Ujwalendu Chakraborty; Haveli Sangeet under Gokulotsav Maharaj; Sarasvathi-veena under Vijaya Varalakshmi; Pung-Achoba under Premjit Singh; and Kalaripayattu under P.K. Balan Gurukkal. Bhattacharya is known for his work on the reconstruction of a holistic system of Natya from the Natyashastra, i.e., the Marga Natya. He has contributed significantly with reconstruction of the Karana (dance) including Vachikabhinaya, and Aharya, and Angahara (movements of the body, including gestures, facial expressions, and dance). He has also worked towards reconstructing the Atodyas (musical instruments or instrumental music) – Tri-Pushkaras, Vipanchi-Chitra-Mattakokila Vinas – and the Gandharva system of singing. He is a visiting faculty of National School of Drama, Sikkim.

== Research ==
Piyal has undertaken thorough research into the reconstruction of Marga Natya, stemming from Nritta, Geet, and Abhinaya practices outlined in Bharata (sage)'s Natyashastra. His aim is to engage with contemporary societal issues while forging a connection between ancient and modern theatrical forms. Central to his exploration is an investigation into the linguistic nuances present in Indian theatrical traditions.

== Theatre direction ==
Bhattacharya has directed ChitraPurvaranga, Uparupaka Bhanaka, Bhanika and Shudraka's Padmapabhritakam Bhana as Padmanka-Gatha. For two other directorial ventures, he adopted Kalidasa's Meghadutam and Ritusamharam respectively as Viraha-Gatha and Samvatsar-Kathaa. His directorial ventures have been performed in major national and international dance and theatre festivals in India. He has also adopted Bhasa's five Sanskrit plays to direct Bhasa-Bharatam, a repertory-production of the National School of Drama, Sikkim.

== Awards ==
- Sangeet Natak Akademi Award 2023 for his contribution in Other Major Traditions of Theatre (Sanskrit Theatre)
