= Chidakash Kalalay =

Indian theater group

Chidakash Kalalay Centre of Art and Divinity
- Formation: 2012
- Type: Theatre group
- Location: Howrah, West Bengal, India
- Artistic director: Piyal Bhattacharya

Spanda Art Space
- Interactive map of the Spanda Art Space area

General information
- Status: Active
- Location: Garia, Boral, Rishi Rajnarayan Pally, Garia, Kolkata, West Bengal 700154
- Coordinates: 22°47′01.711″N 88°37′33.839″E
- Owner: Chidakash Kalalay

Chidakash Kalalay Centre of Art and Divinity is an Indian theatre group from West Bengal. The group is famous for its Marga Natya Parampara

== Major productions ==
Until April, 2024 Chidakash Kalalaya has staged several full-length plays. Some of those are:

- Chitra Poorva Ranga
- Bhaanaka: Reconstruction of Uparupaka
- Padmaank Gatha: the Lotus Consent
- Bhim Hanuman Samvad
- Virahagatha, Based on Kalidasa's Meghaduta

== Theatre Studio: Spanda ==
In Boral, beyond the southern fringes of Kolkata is Spanda, Chidakash Kalalay’s centre for the practice of ancient Indian theatre. Its distinctive architecture contrasts with the structural sameness that marks the surrounding real estate.
