= Spiro Kalemi =

Albanian musicologist

- Born: 1937 (age 88–89); Kavajë, Albania
- Occupation: Musicologist
- Writing career
- Language: Albanian language

Spiro Kalemi (born 1937, in Kavajë) is an Albanian musicologist. He has written a number of books and publications.

== See also ==
- List of Albanian writers
- List of musicologists
