= Kamlesh Dutt Tripathi =

Indian Sanskrit scholar

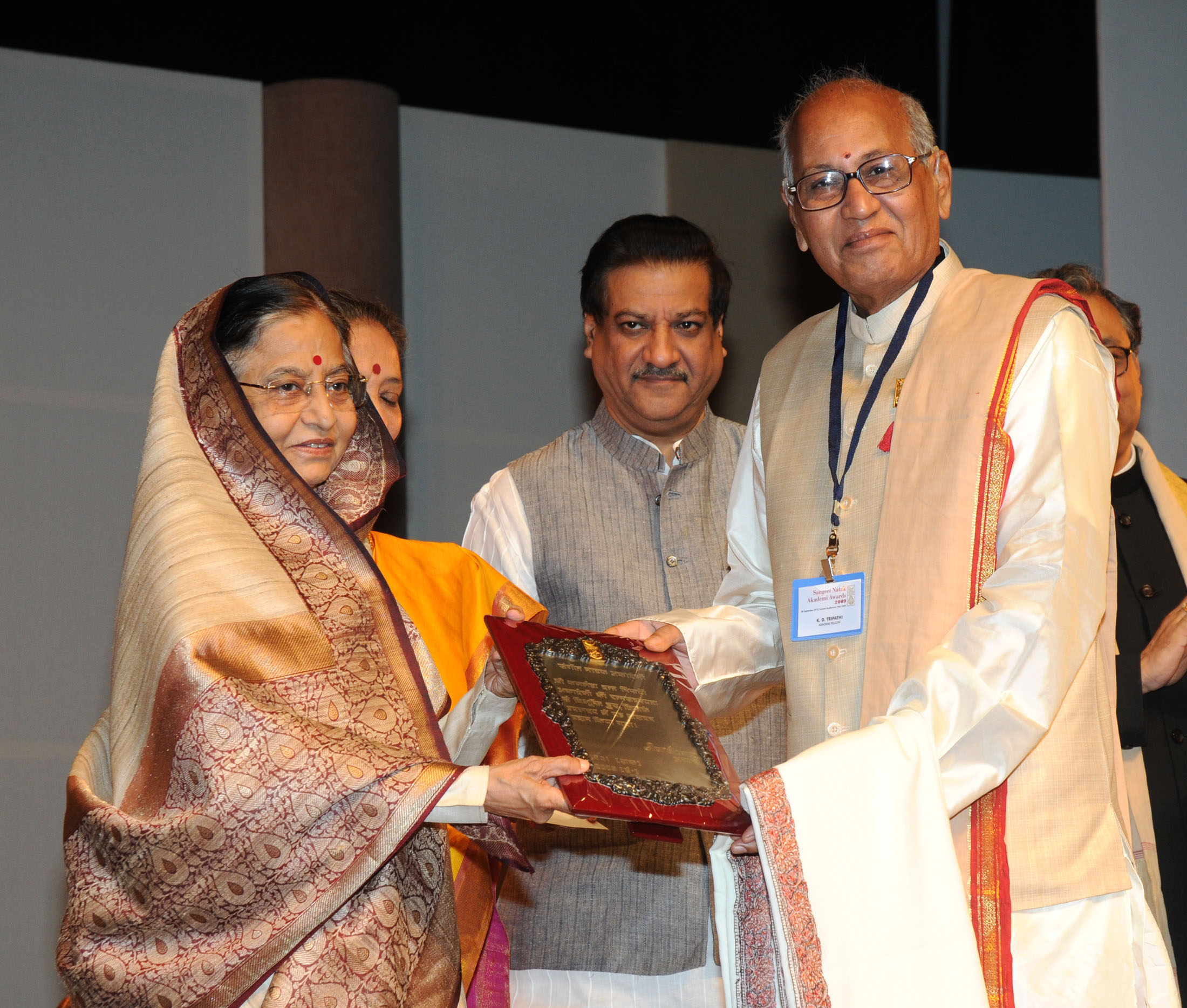
Pratibha Devisingh Patil presenting the Sangeet Natak Akademi Fellowship-2009 to Prof. Kamalesh Datta Tripathi for his outstanding contribution to Sanskrit Theatre

Kamlesh Dutt Tripathi was an Indian theatre personality and professor emeritus of BHU Varanasi. His interest and expertise spreads from Kutiyattam tradition to Ankiya Nat of Assam, aesthetics. He has contributed to the contemporary practice of classical Sanskrit texts in his tenure as the Chairman of Kalidasa Academy Ujjain. He had associated with Natyasastra scholar and Kutiyattam actor Natyacharya Mani Madhava Chakyar. He was instrumental in understanding and performing the plays by Kalidasa and Bhasa. His writings and translations into Hindi of plays like Balacharita were important in understanding the dramaturgy of Bhasa in the modern context.

Tripathi is known to be an authority on Natya Shastra, the Indian treatise on theatre, in terms of its philosophy, aesthetics and techniques and its application in the present context.
