= Ivan Focht =

Yugoslav philosopher and mycologist

- Born: 7 June 1927; Sarajevo, Kingdom of Yugoslavia, (now Bosnia and Herzegovina)
- Died: 20 October 1992 (aged 65); Zagreb, Croatia
- Education: University of Zagreb
- Occupations: Philosopher, mycologist

Ivan Focht (7 June 1927 – 20 October 1992) was a Yugoslav philosopher and mycologist.

Focht was born in Sarajevo to a Jewish family on June 7, 1927. All members of his family were killed during the Holocaust. He finished elementary and high school in Sarajevo. Focht graduated from the Faculty of Humanities and Social Sciences, University of Zagreb, after which he returned to Sarajevo where he was elected assistant at the Faculty of Philosophy, University of Sarajevo. Shortly after he moved back to Zagreb where he lived for the rest of his life, until his death. Focht was philosopher of phenomenological orientation, who in the early works departed from the Marxist and psychological interpretations of art. Music is in his texts had ontological priority over all other arts. In the art of music, particularly that of Bach, Focht tried to uncover the importance of achieving pythagorean music. Bach's music, as interpreted by Focht, is not a mere reflection of the subject, nor a reflection of social reality, just as it is not an expression of human feelings, but the secret of life organized and tuned to the cosmic laws.

Focht, beside the aesthetics, has published several important books about mushrooms. He was also one of the first thinkers and critics of science fiction in Croatia, considering that our age is the time of death of philosophy, or age of science and science fiction. Focht died in Zagreb on October 20, 1992, and was buried at the Mirogoj Cemetery.

== Books ==
- Istina i biće umjetnosti (The Truth and the Being of Art) Sarajevo: Svjetlost, 1959.
- Mogućnost, nužnost, slučajnost, stvarnost / Hegelovo učenje o odumiranju umjetnosti (Possibility, Necessity, Contingency, Actuality / Hegel's Doctrine on the End of Art), Sarajevo: Veselin Masleša, 1961.
- Moderna umetnost kao ontološki problem (Modern Art as an Ontological Problem), Beograd: Institut društvenih nauka, 1965.
- Uvod u estetiku (Introduction to Aesthetics), Sarajevo: Zavod za izdavanje udžbenika, 1972.
- Tajna umjetnosti (The Enigma of Art), Zagreb: Školska knjiga, 1976.
- Gljive Jugoslavije (Mushrooms of Yugoslavia), Beograd: Nolit, 1979.
- Savremena estetika muzike: Petnaest teorijskih portreta (Contemporary Aesthetics of Music: Fifteen theoretical Portraits), Beograd: Nolit, 1980.
- Ključ za gljive (The Key for Mushrooms), Zagreb: Naprijed, 1986.
- Naši vrganji (Our Boletes), Zagreb: Znanje, 1987.

== Selected articles ==
- Najnoviji Lukačev estetički pokušaj, Izraz, 3, knj. 6, br. 11–12, 488–500, (1959)
- Izgledi fenomenološke estetike muzike, Forum: časopis Razreda za suvremenu književnost Jugoslavenske akademije znanosti i umjetnosti, god. 3, knj. 6, br. 11, 679–712, (1964)
- Umjetnička tehnika i tehnifikacija umjetnosti, Praxis, 3, br. 2, 167–180, (1966)
- Modalitet umjetnosti, Forum: časopis Razreda za suvremenu književnost Jugoslavenske akademije znanosti i umjetnosti, god. 10, knj. 22, br. 9, 338–346, (1971)
- Umjetnost kao objektivirani duh, Forum: časopis Razreda za suvremenu književnost Jugoslavenske akademije znanosti i umjetnosti, god. 10, knj. 22, br. 10–11, 552–558, (1971)
- La notion pythagoricienne de la musique: contribution a sa determination, International review of the aesthetics and sociology of music, god. 3, br. 2, 161–172, (1972)
- Korčulanske gljive sabrane u prosincu, Zbornik otoka Korčule, sv. 2, 229–240, (1972)
- Adornos gnoseologistische Einstellung zur Musik, International review of the aesthetics and sociology of music, god. 5, br. 2, 265–276, (1974)
- Andreas Liess: Der Weg nach Innen (Ortung ästhetischen Denkens heute), Verlag San Michele, Zürich 1973, pp. 134 (recenzija), International Review of the Aesthetics and Sociology of Music, 5, br. 2, 346–350, (1974)
- Amuzija hegelijanstva, Polja, 20, br. 186–187, 12–14, (1974)
- Geneza literature, Treći program Radio Beograda, zima, 71-128, (1975)
- Put k ontologiji umjetnosti, u: Ante Marušić (ur.), Svijet umjetnosti: Marksističke interpretacije, Zagreb: Školska knjiga, 195–212, (1976)
- Esej kao protuteža filosofijskom sistemu, Delo, 22, br. 5, 30–39, (1976)
- Gljive dubrovačkog kraja, Dubrovnik, br. 6, 89-102, (1976)
- Muzika i simbolika brojeva, Polja, 23, br. 220–221, 3–6, (1977)
- Smrt i beskonačnost, Polja, 24, br. 236, 31–33, (1978)
- Filozofija muzike, u: Dobroslav Smiljanić (ur.), Filozofija umetnosti, Beograd: Kolarčev narodni univerzitet, 145–155, (1978)
- Filozofski pogledi Franza Kafke: Jedan nacrt, Zbornik Trećeg programa Radio Zagreba, br. 3, 251–259, (1979)
- Problem identiteta muzičkog djela, Život umjetnosti, br. 29/30, 92-102, (1980)
- Jankelevičev muzičko-estetički agnosticizam, Polja, 26, br. 256–257, 197–200, (1980)
- Glazba i gljive padoše nam s neba, Zbornik Trećeg programa Radio Zagreba, br. 6, 195–201, (1981)
- Nesreća u sreći, Polja, 27, br. 264, 57–59, (1981)
- Estetika i moderna umjetnost, Polja, 29, br. 288, 70–72, (1983)

== Translations and introductions ==
- Günther Anders: Kafka - za i protiv, translated by Ivan Focht, Sarajevo: Narodna prosvjeta, (1955)
- Benedetto Croce: Estetika kao nauka o izrazu i opća lingvistika, translated by Vinko Vitezica, foreword by Ivan Focht, Zagreb: Naprijed, (1960)
- György Lukacs: Prolegomena za marksističku estetiku: posebnost kao centralna kategorija estetike, translated by Milan Damjanović, foreword by Ivan Focht, Beograd: Nolit, (1960)
- Max Raphael: Teorija duhovnog stvaranja na osnovi marksizma, translated by Konstantin Petrović, foreword by Ivan Focht, Sarajevo: Veselin Masleša, (1960)
- Max Dessoir: Estetika i opća nauka o umjetnosti, translated by Ivan Focht, Sarajevo: Veselin Masleša, (1963)
- Theodor W. Adorno: Filozofija nove muzike, translated with the foreword by Ivan Focht, Beograd: Nolit, (1968)
- Eduard Hanslick: O muzički lijepom, translated with the foreword by Ivan Focht, Beograd: Beogradski izdavačko-grafički zavod, (1977)
- Vladimir Jankélévitch: Muzika i neizrecivo, translated by Jelena Jelić, foreword by Ivan Focht, Novi Sad: Književna zajednica Novog Sada, (1987)

== Bibliography ==
- Dalibor Davidović: Korak bliže, korak dalje, Odjek, 64, 4, 2011, 33-38
- Dalibor Davidović: Tajna glazbe, Arti musices 45 (2014) 1, 3-32
- Mario Kopić: Krvarenje ljepote, Peščanik, 2013
