= Nikša Gligo =

Croatian musicologist (1946–2024)

- Born: 6 April 1946; Split, PR Croatia, FPR Yugoslavia
- Died: 10 February 2024 (aged 77)
- Education: University of Zagreb; University of Ljubljana
- Known for: 20th-century classical music, Contemporary classical music
- Awards: Josip Andreis Award; Ordre des Arts et des Lettres; Porin Lifetime Achievement Award; Order of Danica Hrvatska
- Scientific career
- Fields: Humanities and musicology
- Thesis: The Problems of the 20th Century New Music: Theoretical Basis and the Evaluation Criteria (1984)
- Doctoral advisor: Andrej Rijavec
- Notable students: Dalibor Davidović

Nikša Gligo (6 April 1946 – 10 February 2024) was a Croatian musicologist and academic.

== Biography ==
Nikša Gligo was born in Split, PR Croatia, FPR Yugoslavia on 6 April 1946. His scientific interests included 20th-century music, music terminology, the aesthetics of music, and music semiology. He has been involved with the Music Biennale Zagreb in various capacities from 1973 to 1991 and from 2002. He served as the art director of the 10th Biennale in 1979. He was a full member of the Croatian Academy of Sciences and Arts from 2006 and a member of section Musicology & History of Art & Architecture of the Academia Europaea from 2014. Gligo died on 10 February 2023, at the age of 77.
