= Shruti Jauhari =

- Born: 1969 (age 56–57); Jabalpur, Madhya Pradesh, India
- Education: MSc (Zoology), MA (Music), PhD (Music)
- Alma mater: Indira Kala Sangeet Vishwavidyalaya
- Occupations: Vocalist, musicologist, writer, music historian
- Known for: Hindustani classical music, khayal and thumri styles
- Notable work: Elements of Hindustani Classical Music (2011); Rag Malika (2016)
- Style: Khayal, Thumri
- Musical career
- Genre: Hindustani classical music
- Instrument: Vocals
- Years active: 1980s–present
- Website: https://shruti.in/

Shruti Jauhari (born 1969) is an Indian Hindustani classical vocalist, musicologist, writer, and music historian. She is known for her work in the khayal and thumri styles. She has authored three books on Hindustani classical music, including Elements of Hindustani Classical Music (2011) and Rag Malika (2016).

Jauhari is a graded artist of All India Radio and has been active in both performance and teaching. She was Faculty Head of Hindustani Classical Music at the KM Music Conservatory in Chennai and visiting faculty at the University of Madras. Her book, Elements of Hindustani Classical Music (2011) is listed as suggested reading in the music syllabi of Sikkim University and the Central University of Punjab.

== Early life and background ==
Shruti Jauhari was born in Jabalpur, Madhya Pradesh. She received her initial training in Hindustani classical music from her father, R. M. Verma, and later trained under Pandit G. R. Kulkarni. She also trained under Pandit Sharada Prasad Bhatt.

Jauhari completed a master's degree in music from Indira Kala Sangeet Vishwavidyalaya and also holds a master's degree in zoology. She also did a PhD in music. In 1994, after moving to Chennai, she undertook voice culture training and studied aspects of Carnatic music under K. J. Yesudas.

== Career ==
She has performed Indian classical music in India and abroad. Since 1988, she has been a graded artist with All India Radio, with broadcasts from its Jabalpur, Bhopal, and Chennai stations.

She has performed at several venues across India, including Vyloppilly Samskriti Bhavan in Kerala, Madras Music Academy in Chennai, India International Centre in New Delhi, Purandara Bhavana in Bengaluru, Bharat Bhavan in Bhopal, and the University of Madras. Outside India, her performances have taken place at Denis Arnold Hall, University of Oxford, Belgrave Neighbourhood Centre, Leicester, National Piping Centre, Glasgow, and the Asian Civilisations Museum in Singapore.

Jauhari has conducted a series of workshops titled Shruti Samvaad, focusing on the fundamentals of Hindustani classical music, including its history, structure, grammar, and stylistic nuances. Some of her workshops have been held at institutions such as Goldsmiths, University of London, the University of Oxford, Asian Civilisations Museum, Singapore, the India International Centre, New Delhi, Narada Gana Sabha, Ramanujan Auditorium, and The Institute of Mathematical Sciences. She has delivered lecture-demonstrations on voice culture as a specialised subject within Hindustani classical music.

In 2018, Jauhari collaborated on Mallikāmoda, a composition combining elements of Hindustani classical music and Western chamber music, commissioned by the University of Oxford Music Faculty and premiered at the Holywell Music Room as part of the Sounds of South Asia Series.

In 2010, Jauhari performed alongside Pandit Ajoy Chakraborty, Mahalakshmi Iyer, and Javed Ali in Raag Roop Aur Rang, a curated concert blending film songs with classical ragas.

=== Writing ===
She wrote her first book on music, titled Elements of Hindustani Classical Music, which was published in 2011 by D.K. Printworld, New Delhi. The book explains the foundational concepts of Hindustani music, including rāg, tāl, gharana traditions, and historical background, and received critical acclaim. Jauhari's Elements of Hindustani Classical Music (2011) is listed as "suggested reading" in the undergraduate music curriculum at Sikkim University and in the postgraduate syllabus at the Central University of Punjab.

Her second book, Rag Malika, was published in 2016 by Sangeet Karyalaya, Hathras. It is an English adaptation of Vishnu Narayan Bhatkhande's Kramik Pustak Malika. The book presents selected rāgs and tāls with notations and interpretive commentary. It is intended to be accessible to both Indian and Western readers. The cover features artwork by S. Rajam.

Jauhari authored her third book, Fundamentals of Hindustani Classical Music, published in 2021 by Munshiram Manoharlal. She also contributed to Bharatasya Sangeet-Vishwanubandha Yatra, an anthropological review of Indian music published by Mumbai Tarun Bharat in collaboration with the Ministry of Culture, Government of India.

=== Academic ===
She has served as visiting faculty in the Department of Music at the University of Madras. In 2001, Jauhari established the Geetanjali Sangeet Academy in Chennai. She served as the Faculty Head of Hindustani classical music at the KM Music Conservatory, founded by A. R. Rahman.

== Bibliography ==
- Elements of Hindustani Classical Music. D.K. Printworld, 2011. ISBN 978-8124605684
- Rag Malika. Sangeet Karyalaya, 2016. ISBN 81-89828-13-4
- Fundamentals of Hindustani Classical Music. Munshiram Manoharlal, 2021. ISBN 978-81-215-1354-8
- Bharatasya Sangeet-Vishwanubandha – Yatra. Mumbai Tarun Bharat & Ministry of Culture, 2023. ASIN B0CG9RTTBH

== Reception ==
Gautaman Bhaskaran of Hindustan Times, in his review of Elements of Hindustani Classical Music, described the book as "an enriching journey of the various gharanas of vocal music, letting us peek into the lives of some illustrious musicologists and singers." He noted that the volume "does not really purport to be a treatise on history" and is "meant for those musically inclined and who might want to pursue this strand of music either as a rasika or a student, perhaps eventually graduating into a performer".

Reviewing Elements of Hindustani Classical Music in The Hindu, Savitha Gautam wrote that the book "packs quite a bit of information" and offers "valuable information about the evolution and the current state" of Hindustani music. She appreciated its coverage of musical forms, gharanas, and notable figures, but noted that it "lacks tight editing" and pointed to issues with grammar and punctuation.

The Hindu, in its review, described Jauhari's book Rag Malika (2016) as "a unique attempt" to adapt V.N. Bhatkhande's Kramik Pustak Malika into English, noting that it "holds enormous possibilities" for connecting Hindustani and Western classical music. It also noted that the book seeks to bridge the gap between Indian and Western musical traditions and contribute to a broader global music consciousness.
