= Friedrich Lippmann (musicologist) =

German musicologist (1932–2019)

Friedrich Lippmann (25 July 1932 – 9 March 2019) was a German musicologist who was considered an authority on 18th and 19th century Italian opera. He studied philosophy and German at the Free University of Berlin from 1951 through 1953. He then studied musicology with Adam Adrio at Humboldt University of Berlin from 1953 through 1956, and then with Friedrich Blume and Anna Amalie Abert at the University of Kiel where he earned his doctorate in 1962. He then worked as a research fellow at the Haydn Institute in Cologne from 1962 through 1964. From 1964 through 1996 he was chair of the music history department at the German Historical Institute in Rome. He published authoritative works on Johann Adolf Hasse and Vincenzo Bellini and was both a contributor and editor of several academic journals; including editor of Analecta musicologica and Concertus musicus. His scholarship on opera was appreciated with a Festschrift in 1993. Lippmann died on 9 March 2019 in Bonn, at the age of 86.
