= Indiranagar Sangeetha Sabha =

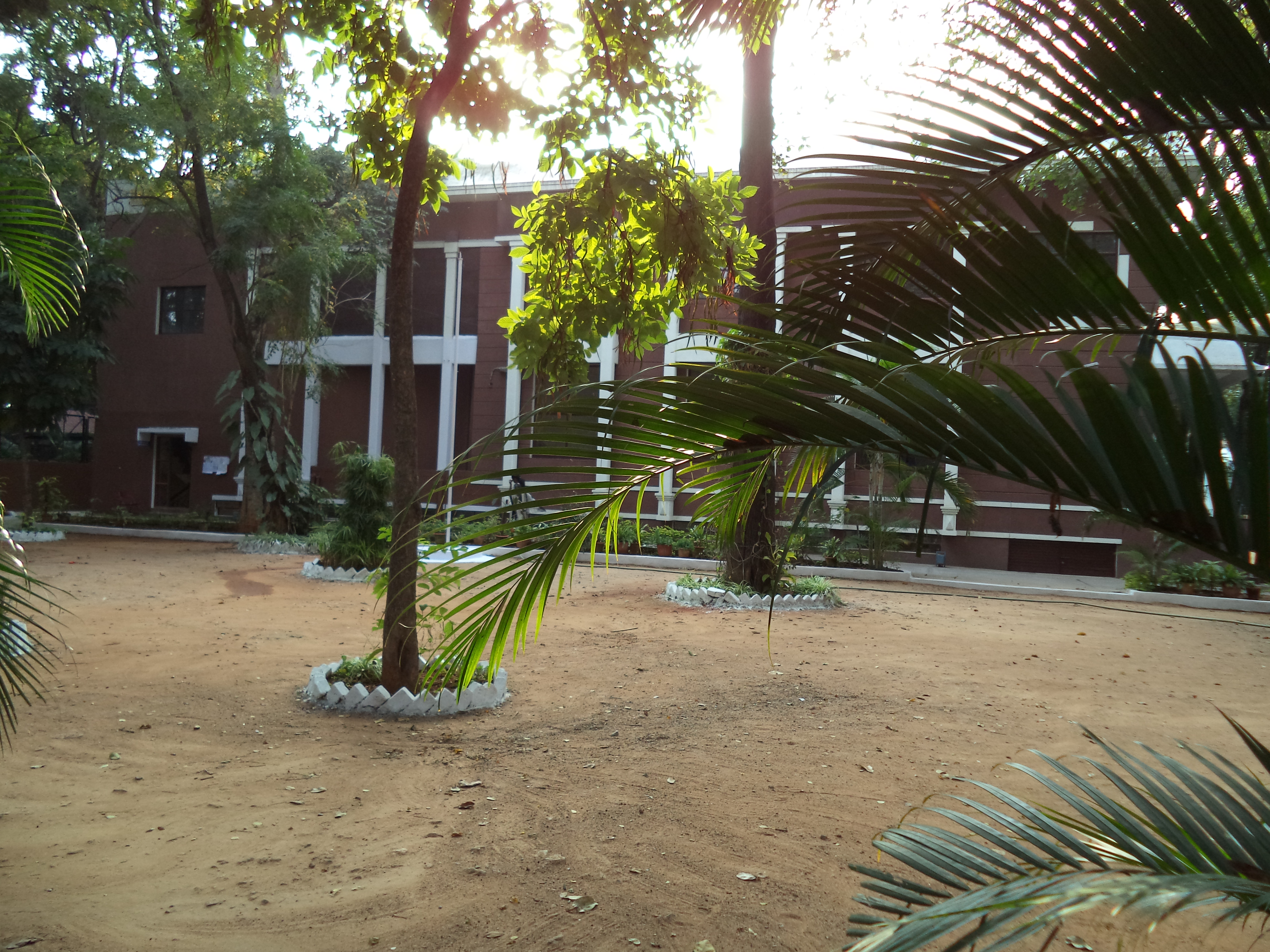
- Bangalore, Karnataka, India

Information
- School type: Music and dance school
- Motto: Center of Excellence for Performing Arts
- Established: 1986
- Website: http://www.isangeethasabha.in/

Indiranagar Sangeetha Sabha (or ISS) was established in 1986 at Indiranagar, Bangalore in the state of Karnataka in India as a school for Indian classical music and dance. In 2004, the Indiranagar Sangeetha Sabha's cultural complex, Purandara Bhavana, was inaugurated by former President of India A. P. J. Abdul Kalam.

== Activities ==
Indiranagar Sangeetha Sabha focusses on Indian classical music and Indian classical dance. The organisation has drafted their own syllabus. Workshops are conducted with respect to voice culture and singing.

== Achievements ==
=== International Music & Dance Conference ===
To bring out the research work of musicians whose works are unrecognised, the Indiranagar Sangeetha Sabha conducts National and International Conferences every three years. 'Africa Meets Asia', an international conference conducted in 2008 brought artistes from different parts of the world on a single platform. In 2011 ISS organised a conference with the theme "Rhythm and Melodies in World Music", national and international scholars took part in the demonstrations. In 2014, the third international music and dance festival was organised with the theme "Classical Forms in World Music".

=== Annual Music and Dance festival ===
Indiranagar Sangeetha Sabha organises an annual Music and Dance festival every year.

=== Purandara award ===
On the occasion of the annual Music and Dance festival, Indiranagar Sangeetha Sabha confers a Purandara award to those in Indian classical music and dance who have contributed to the field. Winners are:

- Dr M Balamuralikrishna
- C Saroja, C Lalitha (Bombay sisters)
- Lalgudi G Jayaraman
- Dr R K Srikantan
- Maya Rao
- Umayalpuram K.Sivaram
- TV Sankaranarayanan

=== Special programs ===
- To Showcase the Indian puppetry art form Indiranagar Sangeetha Sabha supported the Dhaatu Puppet Theater to organise the Dhaatu Puppet Festival 2013.
