= Helmut Rösing =

German musicologist (born 1943)

Helmut Rösing (born in 1943) is a German musicologist. He is Emeritus University Professor of Systematic Musicology and is particularly concerned with the research areas of popular music, reception research, applied music psychology and mass media. He is co-founder of the Arbeitskreis Studium Populärer Musik (ASPM), which is now called Gesellschaft für Popularmusikforschung and was its chairman until 1999. He retired in 2004.

== Life ==
After completing his doctorate in comparative musicology in 1968, Rösing was first editor for symphony and opera at Saarländischer Rundfunk. He habilitated in 1974 at Saarland University, and was head of the central editorial office of the Répertoire International des Sources Musicales (RISM) until 1980, from 1978 to 1992 Professor for Systematic Musicology at the University of Kassel and from 1993 at the Institute for Systematic Musicology at the University of Hamburg. He is the author of numerous publications, especially in the field of popular music research.

== Publications ==
- List of 8 publications on the German National Library.
