= Gavin S. K. Lee =

Musicologist

Gavin S. K. Lee is a musicologist who specializes in queer musicology and global music history. He was an editor-in-chief of Musicological Brainfood (an online publication of the International Musicological Society) from 2023 to 2025.

== Biography ==
He completed his PhD at Duke University, and worked at Soochow University, China before joining the Sydney Conservatorium of Music.

== Research and awards ==
In the field of LGBTQ+ research, he has informed public discussion about how queer and transgender musicians should be interpreted, arguing that "reducing transgender composers to their identities does more harm than good." He has won the American Musicological Society's Philip Brett award for research on trans Indigenous Mexican American composer Mari Esabel Valverde, in which he conducts a "vital conversation around music studies as a form of community care."

He has also won a Society for Music Theory Outstanding Multi-Author Collection Award for Queer Ear: Remaking Music Theory (Oxford University Press). The "first book of its kind" that is positioned to "transform" both musicology and music theory, Queer Ear is “the most comprehensive and valuable resource to date on the relationship between queer theory and music theory.”

His Rethinking Difference in Gender, Sexuality, and Popular Music: Theory and Politics of Ambiguity "recognizes the broad reaching importance of the concept of difference, its slipperyness, and the need for its continual reassessment as a scholarly tool and paradigm."

In the field of global studies, he won the American Musicological Society's Teaching award for his "field-defining" work in global music history pedagogy, which encompasses "thematic bibliographies amounting to almost 600 entries," and is "rooted in a ‘restorative’ ethics that undermines Eurocentrism."

== Publications ==
- "Global Music History Course Design: A Pedagogical Toolbox with Syllabi" special issue. Journal of Music History Pedagogy 14.1 (2024).
- "Hermeneutic Limits; or, When Not to Theorize: Notes for Interpreting Our Phoenix by Trans Indigenous Mexican-American Composer Mari Esabel Valverde" Music Theory Spectrum 46.2 (2024).
- Queer Ear: Remaking Music Theory. Oxford University Press, 2023.
- Rethinking Difference in Gender, Sexuality, and Popular Music: Theory and Politics of Ambiguity. Routledge, 2018.
