= Natya Shastra =

Sanskrit text on the performing arts (200 BCE to 200 AD)

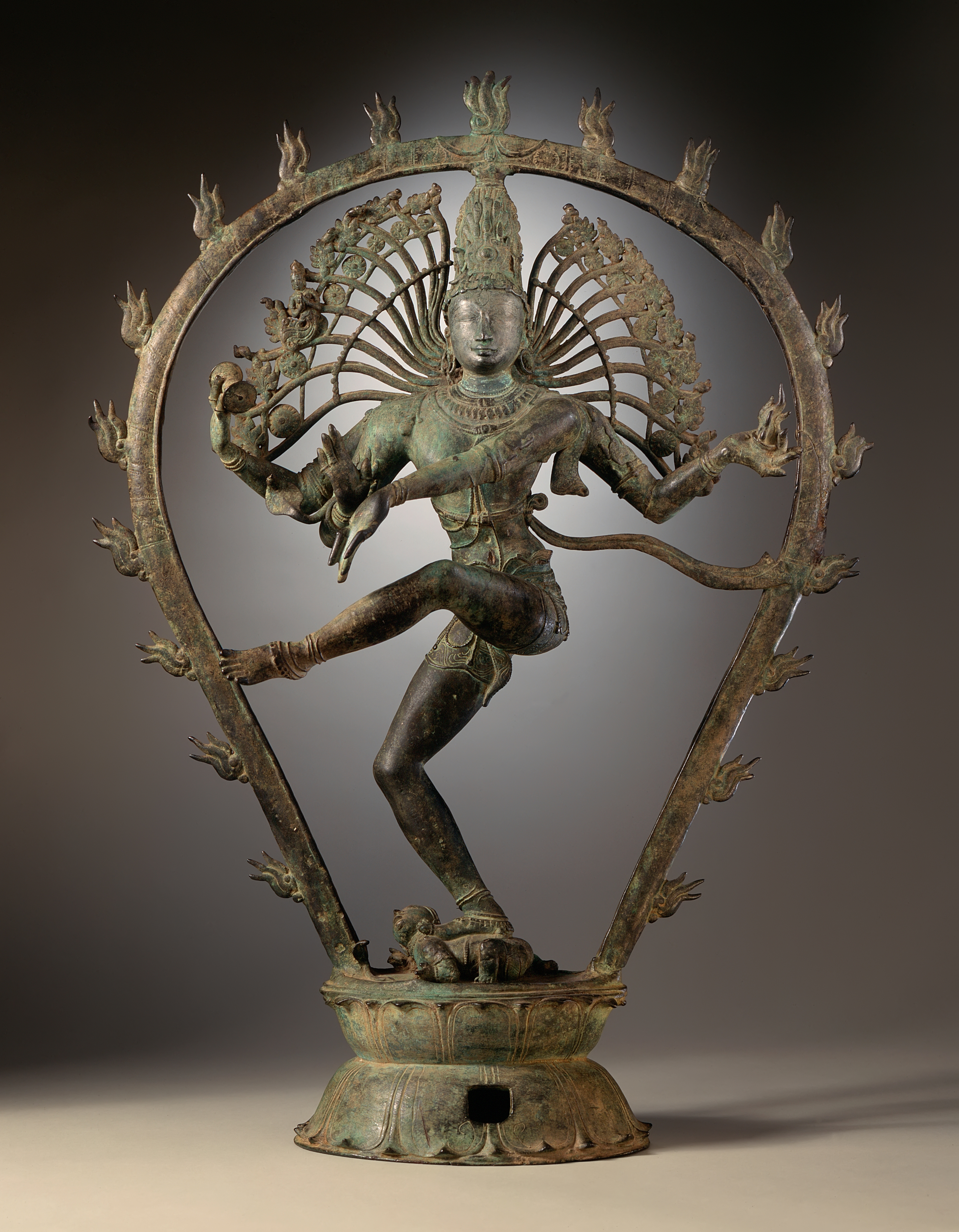
- Shiva as the Lord of Dance

Information
- Religion: Hinduism
- Author: Bharata (sage)
- Language: Sanskrit

The Nāṭya Shāstra (Sanskrit: नाट्य शास्त्र, IAST: Nāṭya Śāstra) is a Sanskrit treatise on the performing arts. The text is attributed to Sage Bharata, and its first complete compilation is dated to between 200 BCE and 200 CE, but estimates vary between 500 BCE and 500 CE.

It is believed to be codified in the 2nd century BCE, the text consists of 36 chapters with a cumulative total of 6,000 verses describing performance arts. The subjects covered by the treatise include dramatic composition, structure of a play and the construction of a stage to host it, genres of acting, body movements, makeup and costumes, role and goals of an art director, the musical scales, musical instruments and the integration of music with art performance.

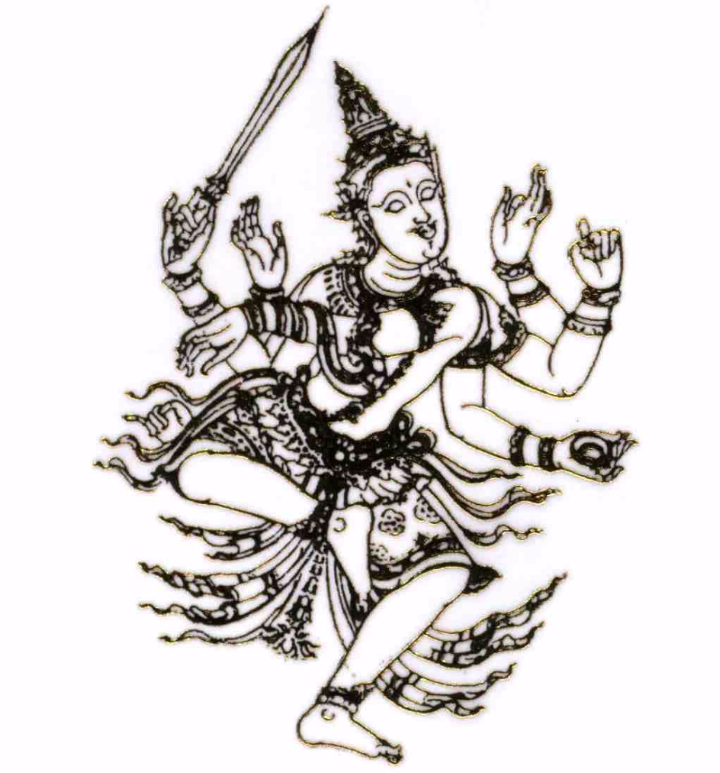
Natya Shastra in Thai art

The Nāṭya Shāstra is notable as an ancient encyclopedic treatise on the arts, one which has influenced dance, music and literary traditions in India. It is also notable for its aesthetic "Rasa" theory, which asserts that entertainment is a desired effect of performance arts but not the primary goal, and that the primary goal is to transport the individual in the audience into another parallel reality, full of wonder, where they experience the essence of their own consciousness, and reflect on spiritual and moral questions. The text further inspired secondary literature such as the 10th century commentary Abhinavabharati – an example of a classic Sanskrit bhasya ("reviews and commentaries") – written by Abhinavagupta. In April 2025, Bharat Muni's Nāṭya Shāstra manuscript was added to UNESCO’s Memory of the World Register.

== Etymology ==
The title of the text is composed of two words, "Nāṭya" and "Shāstra". The root of the Sanskrit word Nāṭya is Nata (नट) which means "act, represent". The word Shāstra (शास्त्र) means "precept, rules, manual, compendium, book or treatise", and is generally used as a suffix in the Indian literature context, for knowledge in a defined area of practice.

== Date and author ==
Performance arts and culture

Let Nāṭya (drama and dance) be the fifth vedic scripture.
Combined with an epic story,
tending to virtue, wealth, joy and spiritual freedom,
it must contain the significance of every scripture,
and forward every art.

— Nāṭyaśāstra 1.14–15

The composition date of Nāṭya Shāstra is unknown. Estimates vary between 500 BCE to 500 CE. The text may have started in the 1st millennium BCE, expanded over time, and most scholars suggest, based on mention of this text in other Indian literature, that the first complete version of the text was likely finished between 200 BCE to 200 CE. The Nāṭya Shāstra is traditionally alleged to be linked to a 36,000 verse Vedic composition called Adibharata, however there is no corroborating evidence that such a text ever existed.

The text has survived into the modern age in several manuscript versions, wherein the title of the chapters varies and in some cases the content of the few chapters differ. At some point it was revised in the 9th century Kashmir, where there was a new and intense commercial interest in the work. Some recensions show significant interpolations and corruption of the text, along with internal contradictions and sudden changes in style. Scholars such as PV Kane state that some text was likely changed as well as added to the original between the 3rd to 8th century CE, thus creating some variant editions, and the mixture of poetic verses and prose in a few extant manuscripts of Nāṭya Shāstra may be because of this. According to Pramod Kale, who received a doctorate on the text from the University of Wisconsin, the surviving version of Nāṭya Shāstra likely existed by the 8th-century.

The author of the Nāṭya Shāstra is unknown, and the Hindu tradition attributes it to the Rishi (sage) Bharata. It may be the work of several authors, but scholars disagree. Bharat Gupt states that the text stylistically shows characteristics of a single compiler in the existing version, a view shared by Kapila Vatsyayan. The Agni Purana, includes chapters on dramatic arts and poetry, which follow the Nāṭya Shāstra format, but enumerates more styles and types of performance arts, which states Winternitz, may reflect an expansion in studies of the arts by the time Agni Purana was composed.

=== Historical roots ===
The Nāṭya Shāstra is the oldest surviving ancient Indian work on performance arts. The roots of the text extend at least as far back as the Naṭasūtras, dated to around the mid 1st millennium BCE.

The Natasutras are mentioned in the text of Panini, the sage who wrote the classic on Sanskrit grammar, and who is dated to about 500 BCE. This performance arts related Sutra text is mentioned in other late Vedic texts, as are two scholars names Shilalin (IAST: Śilālin) and Krishashva (Kṛśaśva), credited to be pioneers in the studies of ancient drama, singing, dance and Sanskrit compositions for these arts. The Nāṭya Shāstra refers to drama performers as Śhailālinas, likely because they were so known at the time the text was written, a name derived from the legacy of the vedic sage Śilālin credited with Natasutras. Richmond et al. estimate the Natasutras to have been composed around 600 BCE.

According to Lewis Rowell, a professor of Music specializing on classical Indian music, the earliest Indian artistic thought included three arts, syllabic recital (vadya), melos (gita) and dance (nrtta), as well as two musical genre, Gandharva (formal, composed, ceremonial music) and Gana (informal, improvised, entertainment music). The Gandharva subgenre also implied celestial, divine associations, while the Gana was free form art and included singing. The Sanskrit musical tradition spread widely in the Indian subcontinent during the late 1st millennium BCE, and the ancient Tamil classics make it "abundantly clear that a cultivated musical tradition existed in South India as early as the last few pre-Christian centuries".

The art schools of Shilalin and Krishashva, mentioned in both the Brahmanas and the Kalpasutras and Srautasutras, may have been associated with the performance of vedic rituals, which involved storytelling with embedded ethical values. The Vedanga texts such as verse 1.4.29 of Panini Sutras mention these as well. The roots of the Nāṭya Shāstra thus likely trace to the more ancient vedic traditions of integrating ritual recitation, dialogue and song in a dramatic representation of spiritual themes. The Sanskrit verses in chapter 13.2 of Shatapatha Brahmana (~800–700 BCE), for example, are written in the form of a riddle play between two actors.

The Vedic sacrifice (yajna) is presented as a kind of drama, with its actors, its dialogues, its portion to be set to music, its interludes, and its climaxes.

— Louis Renou, Vedic India

== Structure ==
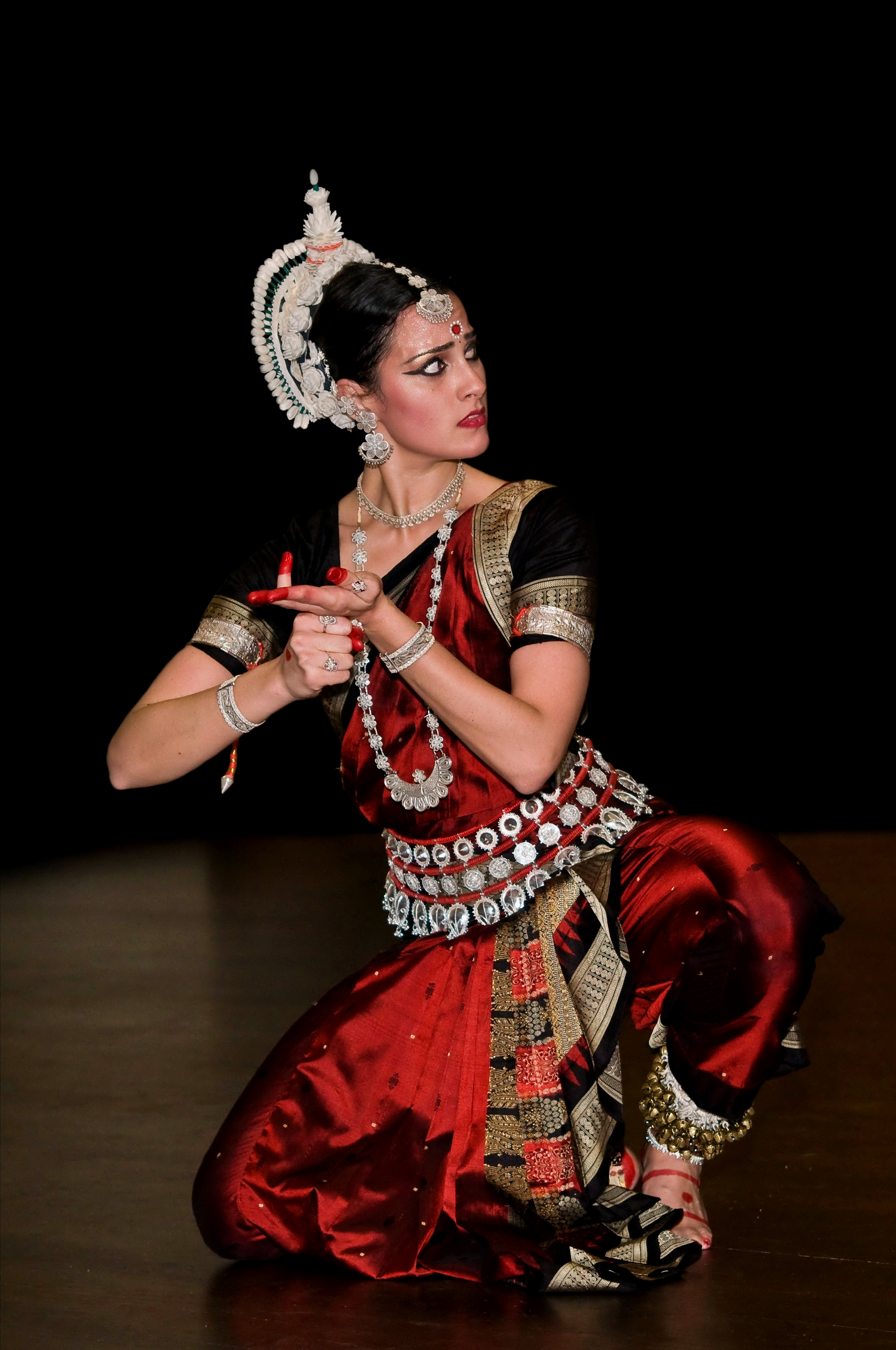
The Natyashastra discusses dance and many other performing arts.

The most studied version of the text, consisting of about 6000 poetic verses, is structured into 36 chapters. The tradition believes that the text originally had 12,000 verses. Somewhat different versions of the manuscripts exist, and these contain 37 or 38 chapters. Predominant number of its verses are in precise Anustubh meter (4x8, or exactly 32 syllables in every shloka), some verses are in Arya meter (a morae-based Sanskrit meter), and the text has some text that is in prose particularly in chapters 6, 7 and 28.

The structure of the text harmoniously compiles aspects of the theatrical arts into separate chapters. The text opens with the mythical genesis and history of drama, mentions the role of different Hindu deities in various aspects of the arts, and the recommended puja (consecration ceremony) of a stage for performance arts. The text, states Natalia Lidova, then describes the theory of Tāṇḍava dance (Shiva), the theory of rasa, of bhāva, expression, gestures, acting techniques, basic steps, standing postures.

Chapters 6 and 7 present the "Rasa" theory on aesthetics in performance arts, while chapters 8 to 13 are dedicated to the art of acting. Stage instruments such as methods for holding accessories, weapons, relative movement of actors and actresses, scene formulation, stage zones, conventions and customs are included in chapters 10 to 13 of the Natyashastra.

The chapters 14 to 20 are dedicated to plot and structure of underlying text behind the performance art. These sections include the theory of Sanskrit prosody, musical meters and the language of expression. Chapter 17 presents the attributes of poetry and figures of speech, while chapter 18 presents the art of speech and delivery in the performance arts. The text lists ten kinds of play, presents its theory of plot, costumes, and make-up. The text dedicates several chapters exclusively to women in performance arts, with chapter 24 on female theater. The training of actors is presented in chapters 26 and 35 of the text.

The theory of music, techniques for singing, and music instruments are discussed over chapters 28 to 34. The text in its final chapters describes the various types of dramatic characters, their roles and need for team work, what constitutes an ideal troupe, closing out the text with its comments of the importance of performance arts on culture.

== Contents ==
Dramatic arts

Natyashastra praises dramatic arts as a
comprehensive aid to the learning of virtue,
proper behavior, ethical and moral fortitude,
courage, love and adoration of the divine.

— Susan L. Schwartz

The contents of the Nāṭya Shāstra, states Susan Schwartz, are "in part theatrical manual, part philosophy of aesthetics, part mythological history, part theology". It is the oldest surviving encyclopedic treatise on dramaturgy from India, with sections on the theory and practice of various performance arts. The text extends its reach into asking and understanding the goals of performance arts, the nature of the playwright, the artists and the spectators, their intimate relationship during the performance. Natya topics as envisioned in this text includes what in western performing arts would include drama, dance, theatre, poetry and music. The text integrates its aesthetics, axiology and description of arts with mythologies associated with Hindu Devas and Devis. Performance arts, states Nāṭya Shāstra, are a form of Vedic ritual ceremony (yajna).

The general approach of the text is treated entertainment as an effect, but not the primary goal of arts. The primary goal is to lift and transport the spectators, unto the expression of ultimate reality and transcendent values. The text allows, states Schwartz, the artists "enormous innovation" as they connect the playwright and the spectators, through their performance, to Rasa (the essence, juice).

The "rasa theory" of Nāṭya Shāstra, states Daniel Meyer-Dinkgräfe, presumes that bliss is intrinsic and innate in man, it exists in oneself, that manifests non-materially through spiritual and personally subjective means. Performance arts aim to empower man to experience this rasa, or re-experience it. Actors aim to journey the spectator to this aesthetic experience within him. Rasa is prepared, states Nāṭya Shāstra, through a creative synthesis and expression of vibhava (determinants), anubhava (consequents) and vyabhicharibhava (transitory states). In the process of emotionally engaging the individual in the audience, the text outlines the use of eight sentiments – erotic, comic, pathetic, terrible, furious, odious, heroic and marvellous.

=== Concept of Natya ===
The Nāṭya Shāstra defines drama in verse 6.10 as that which aesthetically arouses joy in the spectator, through the medium of actor's art of communication, that helps connect and transport the individual into a super sensual inner state of being. The Natya connects through abhinaya, that is applying body-speech-mind and scene, wherein asserts Nāṭya Shāstra, the actors use two practices of dharmi (performance), in four styles and four regional variations, accompanied by song and music in a playhouse carefully designed to achieve siddhi (success in production).

The verse details the eleven essential components of drama and dramatic production:

1. Rasa
2. Bhāva
3. Abhinaya
4. Dharmī
5. Vṛtti
6. Pravṛtti
7. Svara (sound)
8. Gāna (song)
9. Ātodya (orchestra)
10. Raṅga (places of performance)
11. Siddhi (success of the production)

=== Stage ===
The text discusses a variety of performance arts as well as the design of the stage. The text details three architectural styles for the playhouse:

1. Vikrista (oblong)
2. Caturasra (square)
3. Tryasra (triangular)

Drama did not require painted scenery, instead utilizing costumes and makeup. Well aware of the limitations of realism, descriptions of the setting were interwoven in rhythmic verse and prose. Further, detailed zonal rules outlined how to portray settings inside and outside a house, as well as settings near or far. For example, change in acts would convey travel to distant lands.

=== Drama ===
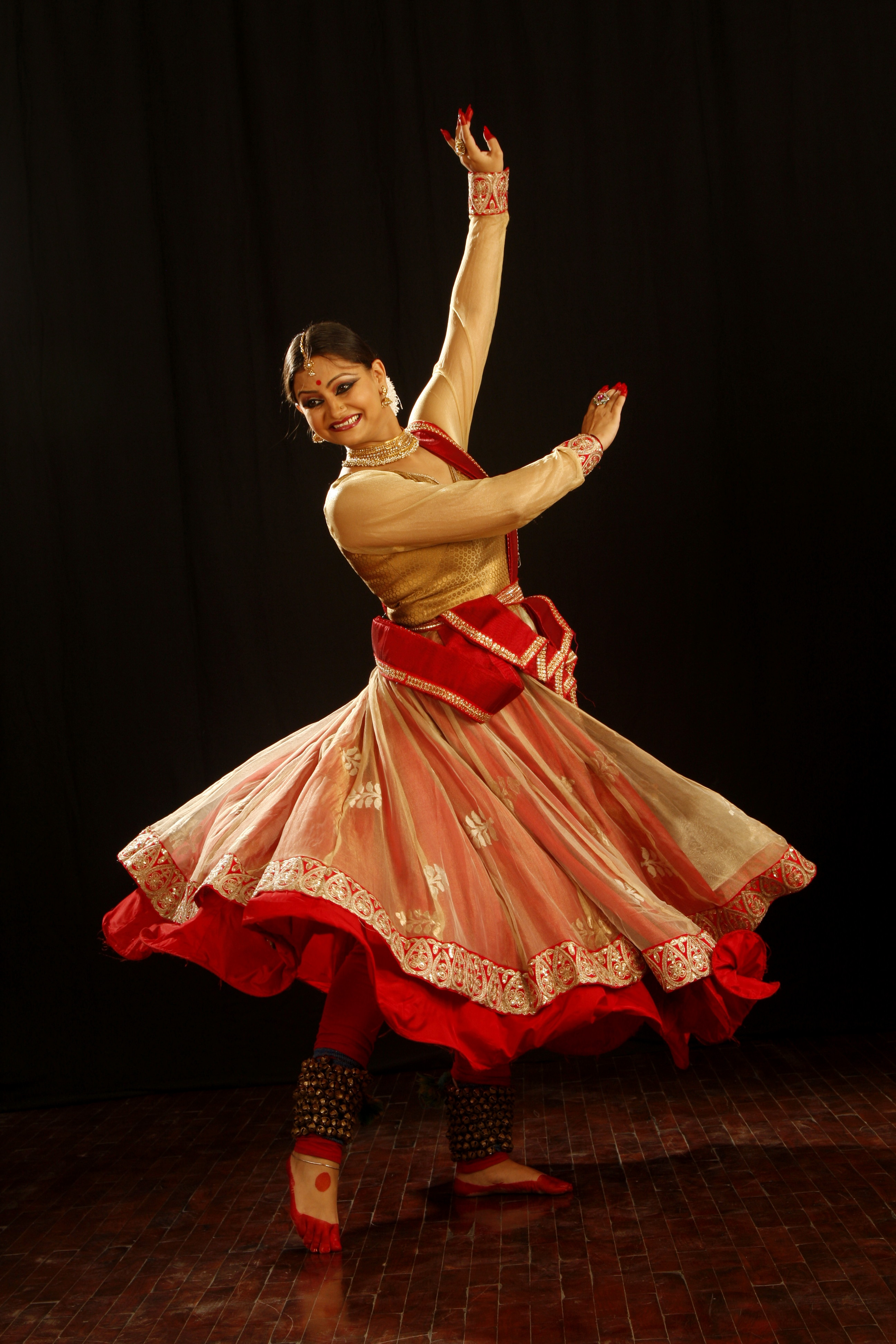
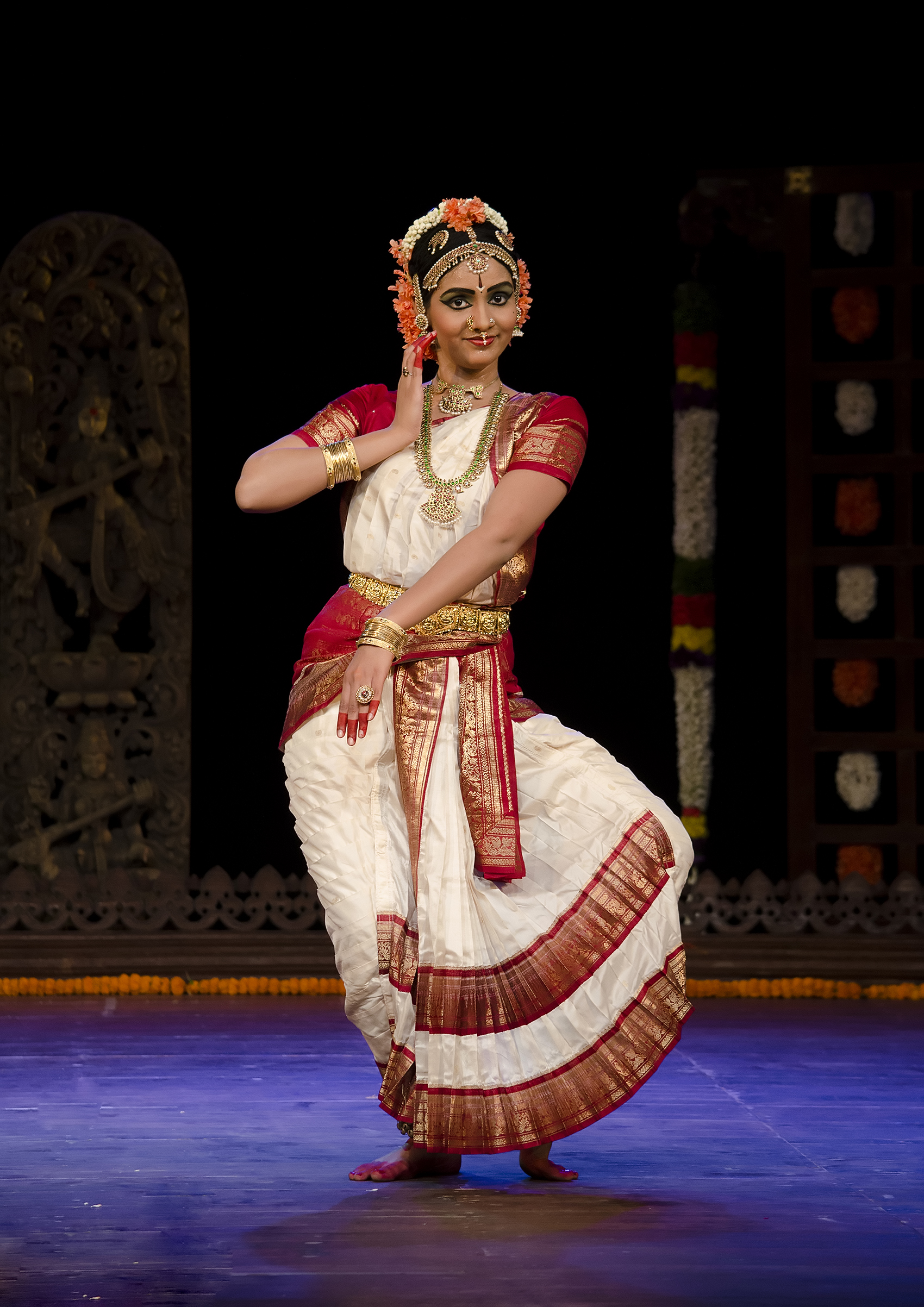
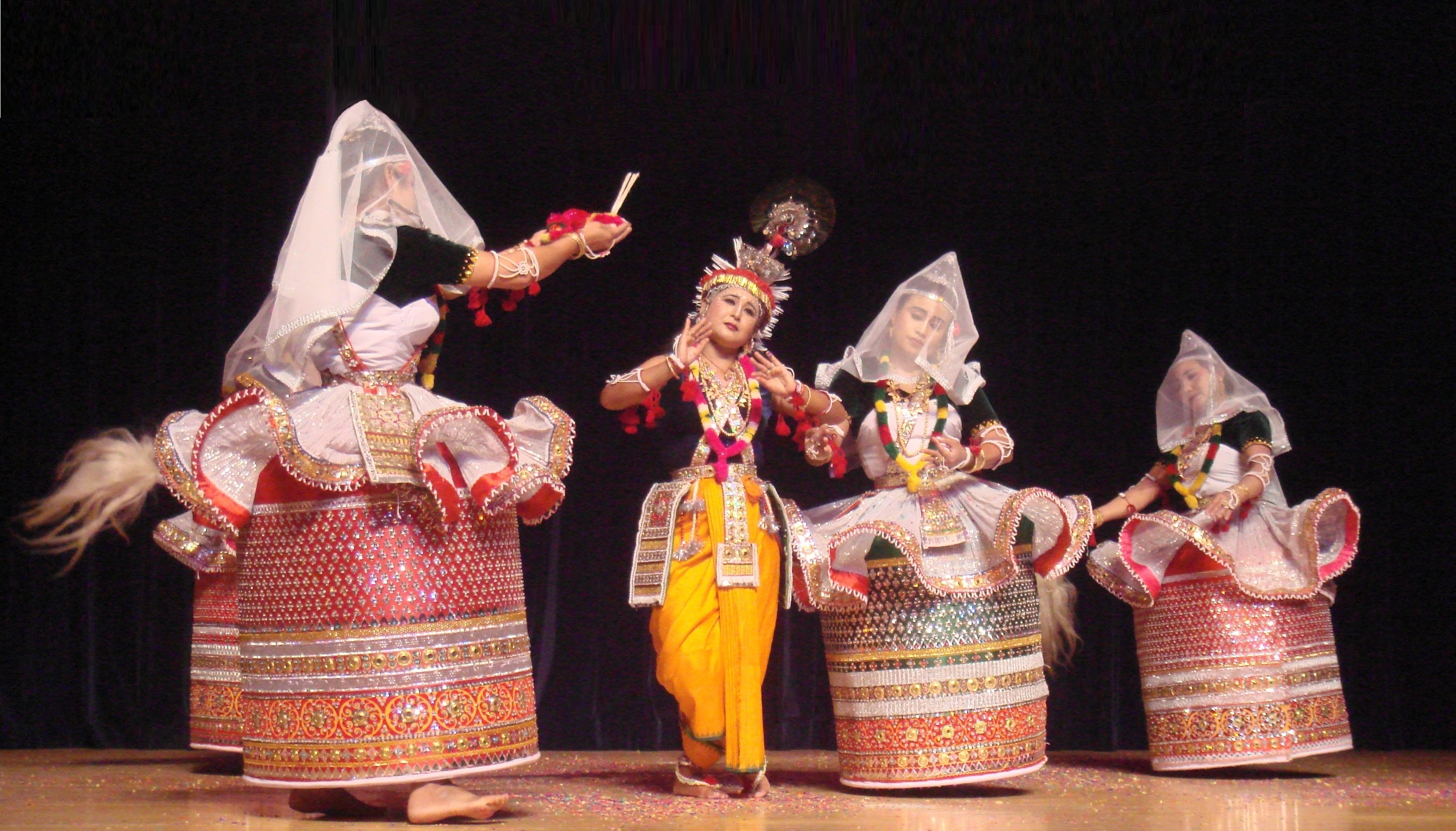
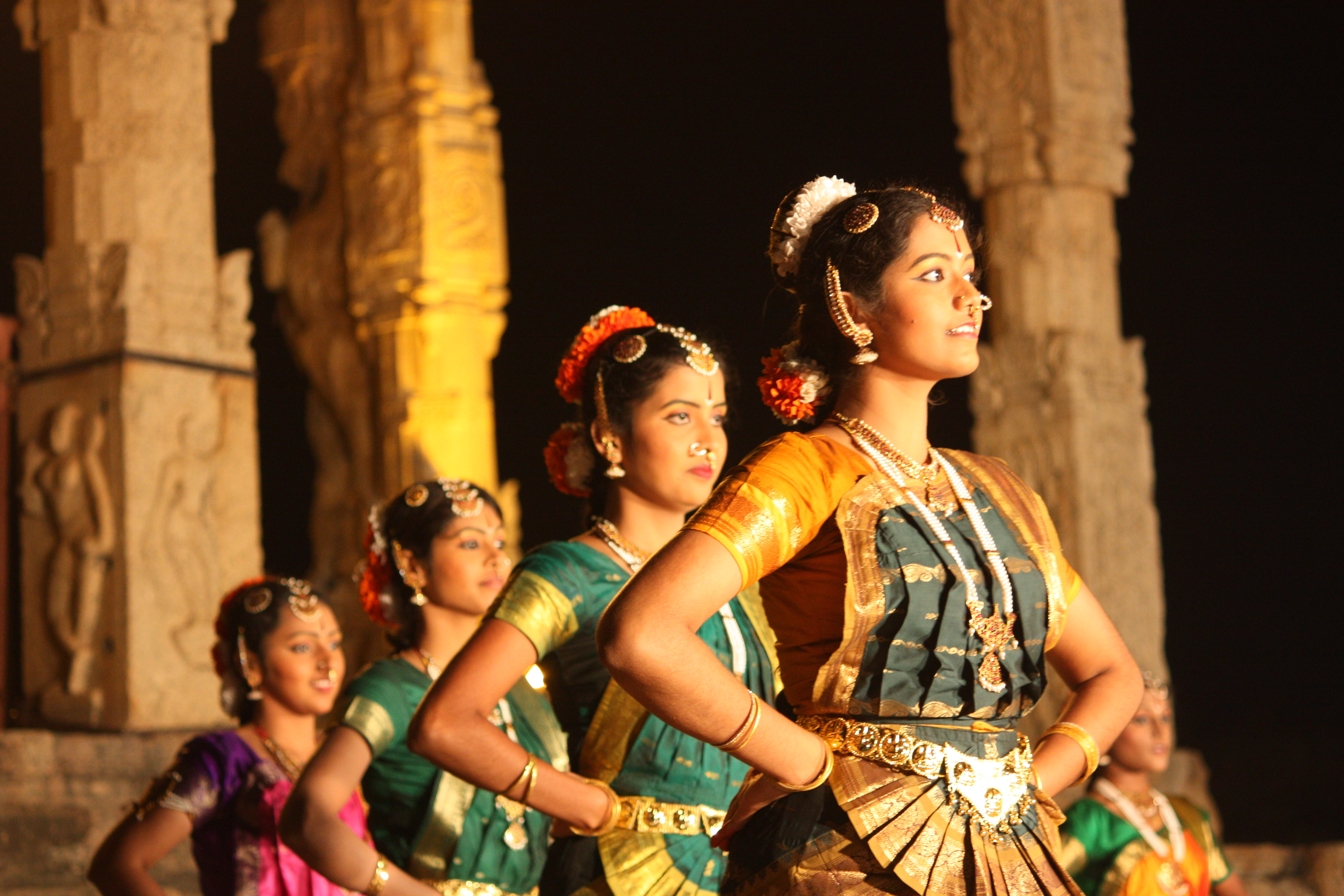
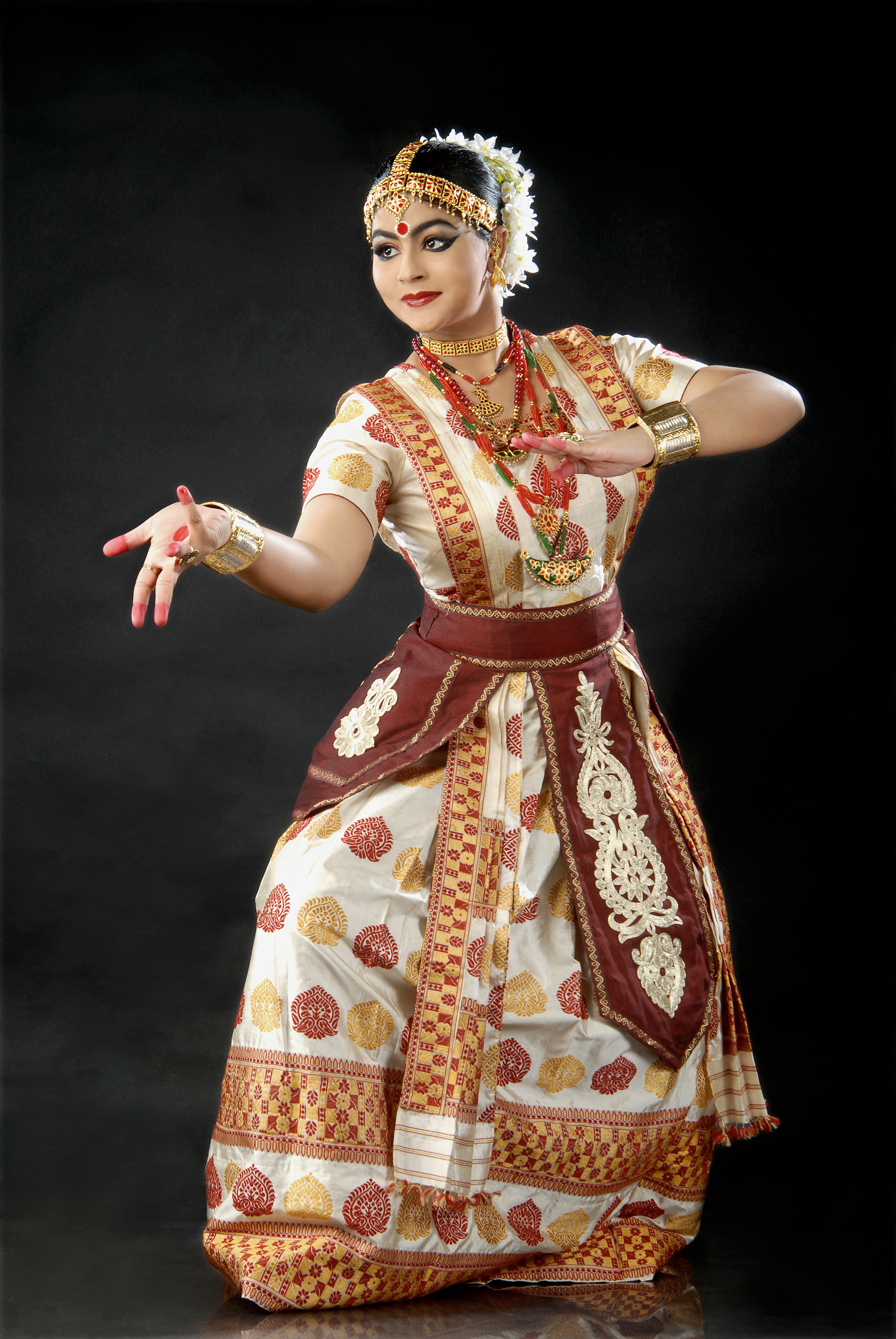
Various classical dance forms

Drama, in this ancient Sanskrit text, is an art to engage every aspect of life, in order to glorify and gift a state of joyful consciousness.

The text discusses the universal and inner principles of drama, that it asserts successfully affects and journeys the audience to a supersensual state of discovery and understanding. The stories and plots were provided by the Itihasas (epics), the Puranas and the Kathas genre of Hindu literature. The text also states that the god Brahma combined the elements of acting from the four Vedas: "recitation from the Rigveda, music from the Samaveda, mimetic art from the Yajurveda, and sentiments from the Atharvaveda."

The text states that the playwright should know the bhavas (inner state of being) of all characters in the story, and it is these bhavas that the audience of that drama connects with. The hero is shown to be similar to everyone in some ways, trying to achieve the four goals of human life in Hindu philosophy, then the vastu (plot) emerges through the "representation of three worlds – the divine, the human, the demonic". Drama has dharma, it has artha, it has kama, it has humor, fighting and killing. The best drama shows the good and the bad, actions and feelings, of each character, whether God or man.

According to Nāṭya Shāstra, state Sally Banes and Andre Lepecki, drama is that art which accepts human beings are in different inner states when they arrive as audience, then through the art performed, it provides enjoyment to those wanting pleasure, solace to those in grief, calmness to those who are worried, energy to those who are brave, courage to those who are cowards, eroticism to those who want company, enjoyment to those who are rich, knowledge to those who are uneducated, wisdom to those who are educated. Drama represents the truths about life and worlds, through emotions and circumstances, to deliver entertainment, but more importantly ethos, questions, peace and happiness.

The text goes into specifics to explain the means available within dramatic arts to achieve its goals. Just like the taste of food, states Nāṭya Shāstra, is determined by combination of vegetables, spices and other articles such as sugar and salt, the audience tastes dominant states of a drama through expression of words, gestures and temperaments. These dominant states are love, mirth, sorrow, anger, energy, terror, disgust and astonishment. Further, states the text, there are 33 psychological states which are transitory such as discouragement, weakness, apprehension, intoxication, tiredness, anxiety, agitation, despair, impatience. There are eight temperamental states that a drama can deploy to carry its message. The text describes four means of communication between the actors and the audience – words, gestures, dresses, representation of temperament and aharya (make ups, cosmetics), all of which should be harmonious with the temperament envisioned in the drama. The text discusses the dominant, transitory and temperamental states, for dramatic arts, and the means that an artist can use to express these states, in chapters 6 through 7.

The Nāṭya Shāstra describes the stage for performance arts as the sacred space for artists, and discusses the specifics of stage design, positioning the actors, the relative locations, movement on stage, entrance and exit, change in background, transition, objects displayed on the stage, and such architectural features of a theatre; the text asserts that these aspects help the audience get absorbed in the drama as well as understand the message and the meaning being communicated. After the 10th-century, Hindu temples were designed to include stages for performance arts (for example, kuttampalams), or prayer halls (for example, namghar) that seconded as dramatic arts stage, based on the square principle described in the Nāṭya Shāstra, such as those in the peninsular and eastern states of India.

=== Song and dance in arts ===
The Nāṭya Shāstra discusses Vedic songs, and also dedicates over 130 verses to non-Vedic songs. Chapter 17 of the text is entirely dedicated to poetry and the structure of a song, which it states is also the template for composing plays. Its chapter 31 asserts that there are seven types of songs, and these are Mandraka, Aparantaka, Rovindaka, Prakari, Ullopyaka, Ovedaka and Uttara. It also elaborates on 33 melodic alankaras in songs. These are melodic tools of art for any song, and they are essential. Without these melodic intonations, states the text, a song becomes like "a night without the moon, a river without water, a creeper without a flower and a woman without an ornament". A song also has four basic architectural varna to empower its meaning, and these tone patterns are ascending line, steady line, descending line and the unsteady line.

The ideal poem produces bliss in the reader, or listener. It transports the audience into an imaginative world, transforms their inner state, and delivers him to a higher level of consciousness, suggests Nāṭya Shāstra. Great songs do not instruct or lecture, they delight and liberate from within to a state of godlike ecstasy. According to Susan Schwartz, these sentiments and ideas of Nāṭya Shāstra likely influenced the devotional songs and musical trends of the Bhakti movement that emerged in Hinduism during the second half of the 1st millennium CE.

Indian dance (nritta, नृत्त) traditions, states Daniel Meyer-Dinkgräfe, have roots in the aesthetics of Nāṭya Shāstra. The text defines the basic dance unit to be a karana, which is a specific combination of the hands and feet integrated with specific body posture and gait (sthana and chari respectively). Chapter 4 describes 108 karanas as the building blocks to the art of dance. The text states the various movements of major and minor limbs with facial states as means of articulating ideas and expressing emotions.

=== Music and musical instruments ===
The Nāṭya Shāstra is, states Emmie te Nijenhuis, the oldest surviving text that systematically treats "the theory and instruments of Indian music". Music has been an integral part of performance arts in the Hindu tradition since its Vedic times, and the theories of music found in the Nāṭya Shāstra are also found in many Puranas, such as the Markandeya Purana.

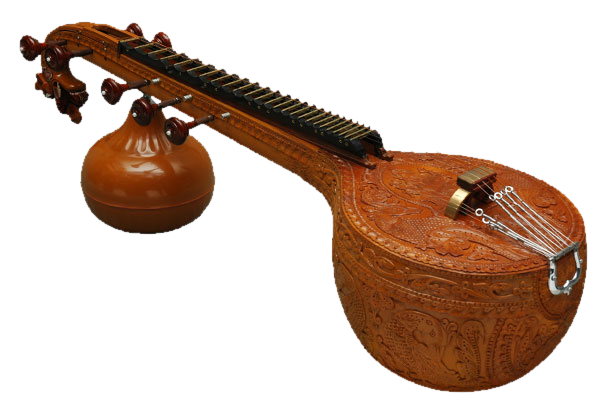
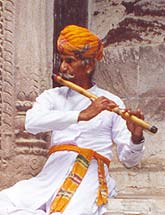
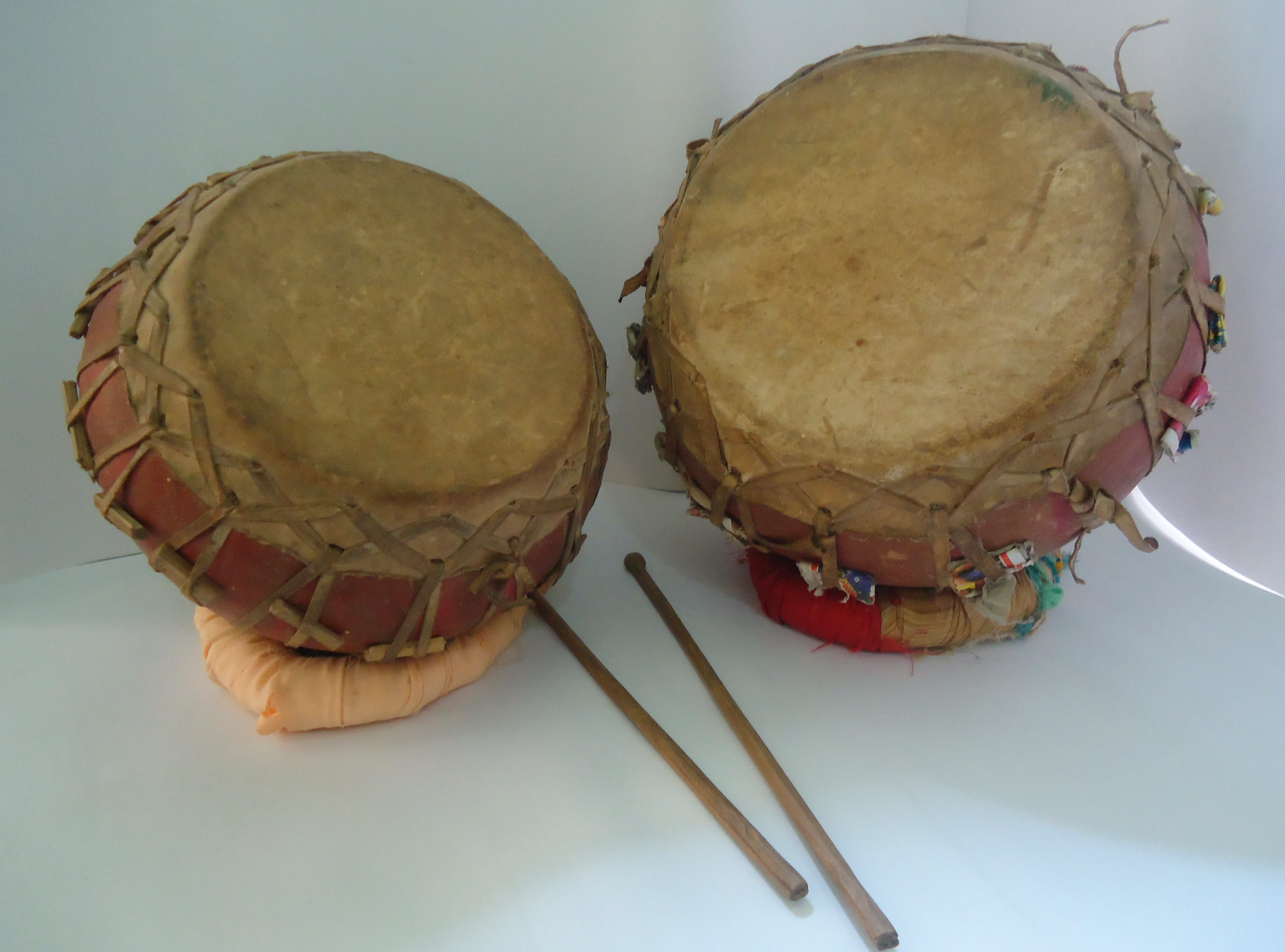
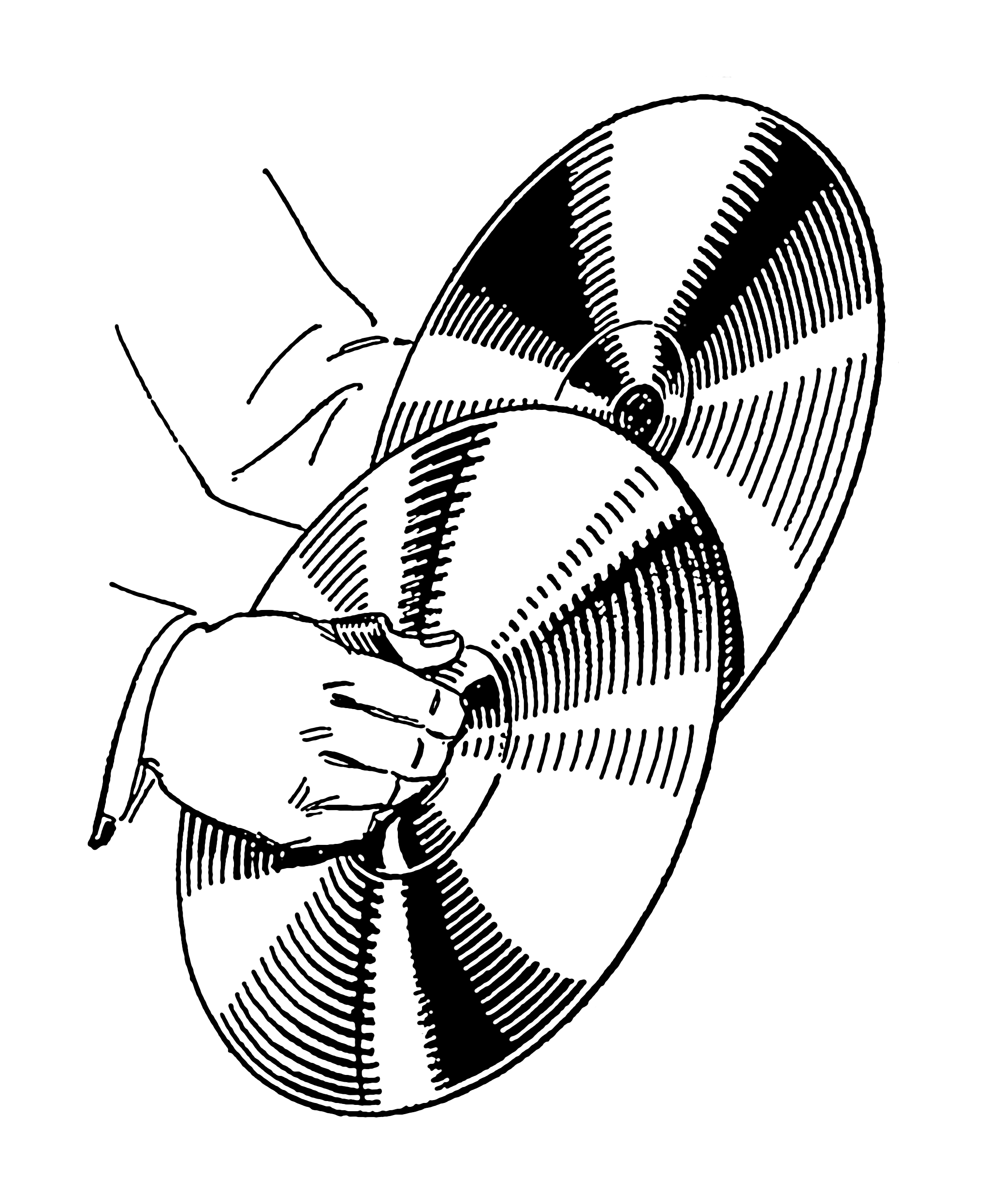
Musical instrument types mentioned in the Natyashastra (string, flute, drums and cymbals).

Prior to the Nāṭya Shāstra, the ancient Indian tradition classified musical instruments into four groups based on their acoustic principle (how they work, rather than the material they are made of). The Nāṭya Shāstra accepts these four categories as given, and dedicates four separate chapters to them, one each on stringed instruments ('tat' or chordophones), hollow instruments ('sushir' or aerophones), solid instruments ('ghan' or idiophones), and covered instruments ('avanaddha' or membranophones).

Chapters 15 and 16 of the text discuss Sanskrit prosody in a manner similar to those found in more ancient Vedanga texts such as the Pingala Sutras. Chapters 28 through 34 are dedicated to music, both vocal and instrument based. Chapter 28, discusses the harmonic scale, calling the unit of tonal measurement or audible unit as Shruti, with verse 28.21 introducing the musical scale as follows,

तत्र स्वराः –
षड्‍जश्‍च ऋषभश्‍चैव गान्धारो मध्यमस्तथा ।
पञ्‍चमो धैवतश्‍चैव सप्तमोऽथ निषादवान् ॥ २१॥

— Natya Shastra, 28.21

Musical scale in Nāṭya Shāstra
Svara (Long)	Shadja (षड्ज)	Rishabha (ऋषभ)	Gandhara (गान्धार)	Madhyama (मध्यम)	Panchama (पञ्चम)	Dhaivata (धैवत)	Nishada (निषाद)	Shadja (षड्ज)
Svara (Short)	Sa (सा)	Ri (री)	Ga (ग)	Ma (म)	Pa (प)	Dha (ध)	Ni (नि)	Sa (सा)
(shadja-graama)								
Varieties	C	D♭, D	E♭, E	F, F♯	G	A♭, A	B♭, B	CC

The music theory in the Nāṭya Shāstra, states Maurice Winternitz, centers around three themes – sound, rhythm and prosody applied to musical texts. The text asserts that the octave has 22 shrutis or microintervals of musical tones or 1200 cents. This is very close to the ancient Greek system, states Emmie Te Nijenhuis, with the difference that each shruti computes to 54.5 cents, while the Greek enharmonic quartertone system computes to 55 cents. The text discusses gramas (scales) and murchanas (modes), mentioning three scales of seven modes (21 total), some of which are the same as the Greek modes. However, the Gandhara-grama is just mentioned in Nāṭya Shāstra, while its discussion largely focuses on two scales, fourteen modes and eight four tanas (notes). The text also discusses which scales are best for different forms of performance arts.

The Nāṭya Shāstra describes from chapter 28 onwards, four types of regular musical instruments, grouping them as stringed giving the example of veena, covered giving the example of drums, solid giving the example of cymbals, and hollow stating flutes as example. Chapter 33 asserts team performance, calling it kutapa (orchestra) which it states to have one male and one female singer with nine to eleven musical instruments accompanied by players.

=== Male and female actors ===
The Nāṭya Shāstra enshrines the male and female actors in any performance art to be the most important. The brightness of performance, or its lack, impacts everything; a great play that is poorly performed confuses and loses the audience, while a play that is inferior in significance or meaning becomes beautiful to the audience when brilliantly performed, states Nāṭya Shāstra. A performance art of any form needs auditors and director, states the text, whose role is to work together with the actors from the perspective of the audience and the significance or meaning the playwright of the art work is attempting to convey.

Training actors

For an actor who is not yet perfect,
the techniques described in the Natyashastra,
are a means to achieve
perfection, enlightenment, moksha,
and run parallel to reaching this state through
yoga or meditation practices.

— Daniel Meyer-Dinkgräfe

The text dedicates significant number of verses on actor training, as did the Indian dramaturgy literature that arose in its wake. The ideal actor training, states Nāṭya Shāstra, encourages self-development within the actor and raises the actor's level of consciousness, which in turn empowers him or her to express ideas from that higher state of consciousness. Acting is more than physical techniques or rote recitation, it is communication through emotions and expression of embedded meaning and levels of consciousness in the underlying text.

The actor, states the text, should understand the three Guṇas, that is Sattva, Rajas and Tamas qualities, because human lives are an interplay of these. The actor must feel a specific state within, to express it without. Thus, states Daniel Meyer-Dinkgräfe, the guidelines in Nāṭya Shāstra employ the ideas in Yoga school of Hindu philosophy, with concepts mirroring asanas, pranayama and dhyana, both for actor training and the expression of higher levels of consciousness.

Specific training on gestures and movements for actors, their performance and significance, are discussed in chapters 8 through 12 of the Nāṭya Shāstra. Chapter 24 is dedicated to females in performance arts, however other chapters on actor training include numerous verses that mention women along with men.

=== The goals of art: spiritual values ===
The Nāṭya Shāstra and other ancient Hindu texts such as the Yajnavalkya Smriti assert that arts and music are spiritual, with the power to guide one to moksha, through strengthening the concentration of mind for the liberation of the Self (soul, Atman). These arts are offered as alternate paths (Marga Natya or yoga), of strength similar to knowledge of the Shrutis (Vedas and Upanishads). Various medieval scholars, such as the 12th-century Mitaksara and Apararka, cite Nāṭya Shāstra and Bharata in linking arts to spirituality, while the text itself asserts that beautiful songs are sacred and performance arts are holy.

According to the Nātya Shāstra, the goal of performance arts is ultimately to let the spectator experience his own consciousness, then evaluate and feel the spiritual values innate in him, and rise to a higher level of consciousness. The playwright, the actors and the director (conductor) all aim to transport the spectator to an aesthetic experience of eternal universals, emancipating him from the mundane to creative freedom within.

The function of drama and the art of theatre, as envisioned in Nāṭya Shāstra, according to Daniel Meyer-Dinkgräfe, is to restore human potential, humanity's journey of "delight at a higher level of consciousness", and a life that is enlightened.

== Commentaries ==
When is a play successful?

Drishtaphala [visible fruits] like banners or
material rewards do not indicate success of
a play production.

Real success is achieved when the play is
performed with skilled precision,
devoted faith and pure concentration.
To succeed, the artist must immerse the
spectator with pure joy of rasa experience.

The spectator's concentrated absorption and
appreciation is success.

— Abhinavagupta on Natyashastra (Abridged)
Trans: Tarla Mehta

Abhinavabhāratī is the most studied commentary on Nāṭya Shāstra, written by Abhinavagupta (950–1020 CE), who referred to Nāṭya Shāstra also as the Natyaveda. Abhinavagupta's analysis of Nāṭya Shāstra is notable for its extensive discussion of aesthetic and ontological questions, such as "whether human beings comprehend performance arts as tattva (reality and truth in another plane), or is it an error, or is it a form of superimposed reality (aropa)?

Abhinavagupta asserts that Nāṭya Shāstra and performance arts appeal to man because of "the experience of wonder", wherein the observer is pulled in, immersed, engaged, absorbed, and satisfied. The performance arts in Nāṭya Shāstra, states Abhinavagupta, temporarily suspends man from his ordinary world, transfers him into another parallel reality full of wonder, where he experiences and reflects on spiritual and moral concepts, and in there is the power of arts to transform the inner state of man, where the beauty of the art lifts him into the goals of Dharma (correct living, virtues, duties, right versus wrong, responsibilities, righteous). He interprets rasa in light of the theory of suggestion (''dhvani") and the philosophy of Kashmir Shaivism. Abhinavagupta is also known for his Advaita Vedanta treatises and a commentary on the Bhagavad Gita, where he touches upon the aesthetics in Nāṭya Shāstra.

The detailed Nāṭya Shāstra review and commentary of Abhinavagupta mentions older Sanskrit commentaries on the text, suggesting the text was widely studied and had been influential. His discussion of pre-10th century scholarly views and list of references suggest that there once existed secondary literature on the Nāṭya Shāstra by at least Kirtidhara, Bhaskara, Lollata, Sankuka, Nayaka, Harsa and Tauta. However, all text manuscripts of these scholars have been lost to history or are yet to be discovered.

== Influence ==
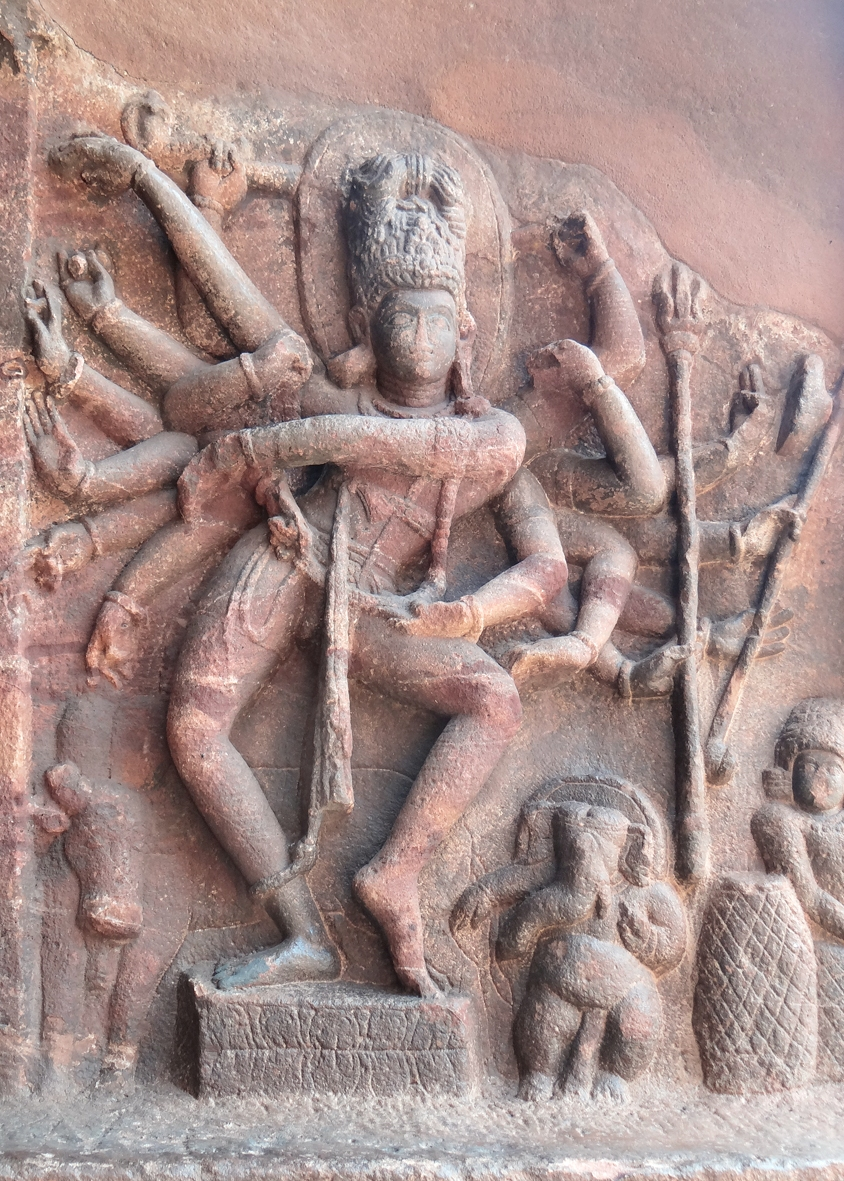
The Natyashastra influenced other arts in ancient and medieval India. The dancing Shiva sculpture in Badami cave temples (6th–7th century CE), for example, illustrates its dance movements and Lalatatilakam pose.

The first chapter of the text declares that the text's origins came after the four Vedas had been established, and yet there was lust, covetousness, wrath and jealously among human beings. The text was written as a fifth Veda, so that the essence of the Vedas can be heard and viewed, in Natya form to encourage every member of the society to dharma, artha and kama. The text originated to enable arts that influence the society and encourage each individual to consider good counsel, to explain sciences and demonstrate arts and crafts widely. The text is a guide and progeny of what is in the Vedas, asserts the Natysashastra. The text re-asserts a similar message in the closing chapter, stating for example, in verses 36.20–21 that performance arts such as drama, songs, music, and dance with music are equal in importance as the exposition of the Vedic hymns, and that participating in vocal or instrumental music once is superior to bathing in river Ganges for a thousand days.

Nāṭya Shāstra, states Natalia Lidova, has been far more than "a mere compendium on drama". It provided the foundation of theatrical and literary works that followed, which shaped the post-Vedic culture. It has been an important source book of Hindu performance arts and its cultural beliefs regarding the role of arts in the social (dharmic) as well as the personal inner life of man in Hinduism.

The Nāṭya Shāstra text has been influential in other arts. The 108 dance forms described in the Nāṭya Shāstra, for example, have inspired Shiva sculptures of the 1st-millennium BCE, particularly the Tandava style which fuses many of these into a composite image found at the Nataraja temple of Chidambaram. The movements of dance and expression in the Nāṭya Shāstra are found carved on the pillars, walls and gateways of 1st-millennium Hindu temples.

The specifications provided in the Nāṭya Shāstra can be found in the depiction of arts in sculpture, in icons and friezes across India.

[In Indian arts] the imagery of the Upanishads and the elaborate ritual of the Brahmanas is the ground plan for each of the arts, be it architecture, sculpture, painting, music, dance or drama. The artist repeats and chisels this imagery by giving it concrete shape through stone, sound, line or movement.

— Kapila Vatsyayan, The Square and the Circle of the Indian Arts,

The Rasa theory of Nāṭya Shāstra has attracted scholarly interest in communication studies for its insights into developing texts and performances outside the Indian culture.

== See also ==
- Brihaddeshi
- Dance in India
- Dattilam
- Raga – melodic mode
- Rasa – aesthetics in performance arts
- Sangita Ratnakara – one of the most important medieval eras Sanskrit texts on music and dance
- Tala (music) – musical meter, beat
