= S. A. K. Durga =

Indian musicologist and ethnomusicologist

- Born: 1 June 1940; Kumbakonam, British India
- Died: 20 November 2016 (aged 76)
- Education: Loyola College, Chennai, Wesleyan University (doctorate in ethnomusicology), Yale University
- Occupation: Ethnomusicologist
- Parent(s): S. A. Venkatarama Iyer, Lalithabai

S. A. Kumari Durga (1 June 1940 – 20 November 2016) was a musicologist and ethnomusicologist from the Indian state of Tamil Nadu. She was the founder of the Centre for Ethnomusicology based in Chennai.

== Early life ==
Durga was born in Kumbakonam, Tamil Nadu on 1 June 1940 to S. A. Venkatarama Iyer and Lalithabai. Durga had her initial coaching in Carnatic music from her mother, Lalithabai, who was a reputed harikatha expert and a disciple of Rajamanickam Pillai. Her grandfather, S. A. Swaminatha Iyer, was a famous patron of Carnatic music. She began having music lessons from Tirukkodikaval Venkatarama Iyer at the age of eight and from Madurai Mani Iyer at the age of eleven. She had her advanced training from T. Viswanathan and Balamuralikrishna. She learnt Hindustani classical music from Ustad Mohammed Munnawar of Delhi.

== Education ==
Durga pursued her postgraduate education in voice culture at the University of Madras. As a part of her studies in voice culture, she studied physiology under ENT doctors M.S. Venkataraman and S. Ramasamy. On completion of her postgraduate degree, she worked as a lecturer at the university from 1976 to 1979. During her service as lecturer, she was invited to participate at the International Institute for Experimental Research in Singing at Denver, Colorado, where her paper on "Voice Abuse and misuse" was adjudged the best. She completed her doctorate in ethnomusicology at Wesleyan University, US. On 8 March 1984, she performed at a celebration marking the 150th anniversary of Wesleyan University.

On obtaining her doctorate, Durga carried out a comparative study of Gregorian and Vedic chants and Thevaram hymns as a part of her post-doctoral research work at Yale University.

== Awards and honors ==
In 1984, Durga was awarded the Eleanor Roosevelt International Fellowship of International Federation of University of Women. She was awarded the title "Skylark of India" by the American Theatre Group of New York and the Gnana Samudhra award by "Samudhra" magazine on the occasion of its fourth anniversary.

== Work ==
Durga served as the Professor Emeritus of the Department of Indian music at the University of Madras for four years and founded the centre of Ethnomusicology in Chennai and currently serves as its director. Durga is the first Asian to have written a book on ethnomusicology.

From 25 January 2000 to 23 May 2000, Durga wrote a weekly column on ethnomusic for chennaionline.com. She was one of the participants at the First International Conference on Murugan held in Chennai between 28 and 30 December 1998 and in the Second International Murugan Conference held in Mauritius between 24 and 29 April 2001, where she delivered a lecture on "Lord Murugan in Nada Rupa – A critical study".

== Publications ==
- Durga, S. A. K. (1996). Ethnomusicology: A Study of Intercultural Musicology. Chennai: CBR Rhythms. ISBN 81-88827-01-0.
- Durga, S. A. K. (1979). The Opera in South India. B. R. Publishing Corporation. ISBN 81-88827-02-9.
- Durga, S. A. K.; M. Balamuralikrishna (1978). Voice Culture: With Special Reference to South Indian Music. Indian Musicological Society.
- Mehta, Ramanlal Chhotalal; S. A. K. Durga (2003). Distance Education in Music. Indian Musicological Society.
- Durga, S. A. K. (2007). Voice Culture: Art of Voice Cultivation. BR Rhythms. ISBN 978-81-88827-13-8.
- Durga, S. A. K. (1989). A New Approach to Indian Musicological Methodology: An Ethnomusicological Perspective. UMI Dissertation Information Service.
