= Manuel Veiga =

Manuel Veiga may refer to:

- Manuel Veiga (writer), (born 1948), Cape Verdean writer, linguist and politician
- Manuel Veiga (rider), (born 1986), Portuguese dressage rider
- Manuel Veiga López (1935–2010), Spanish professor and politician
