= Marga Natya =

Major form of Indian classical dance

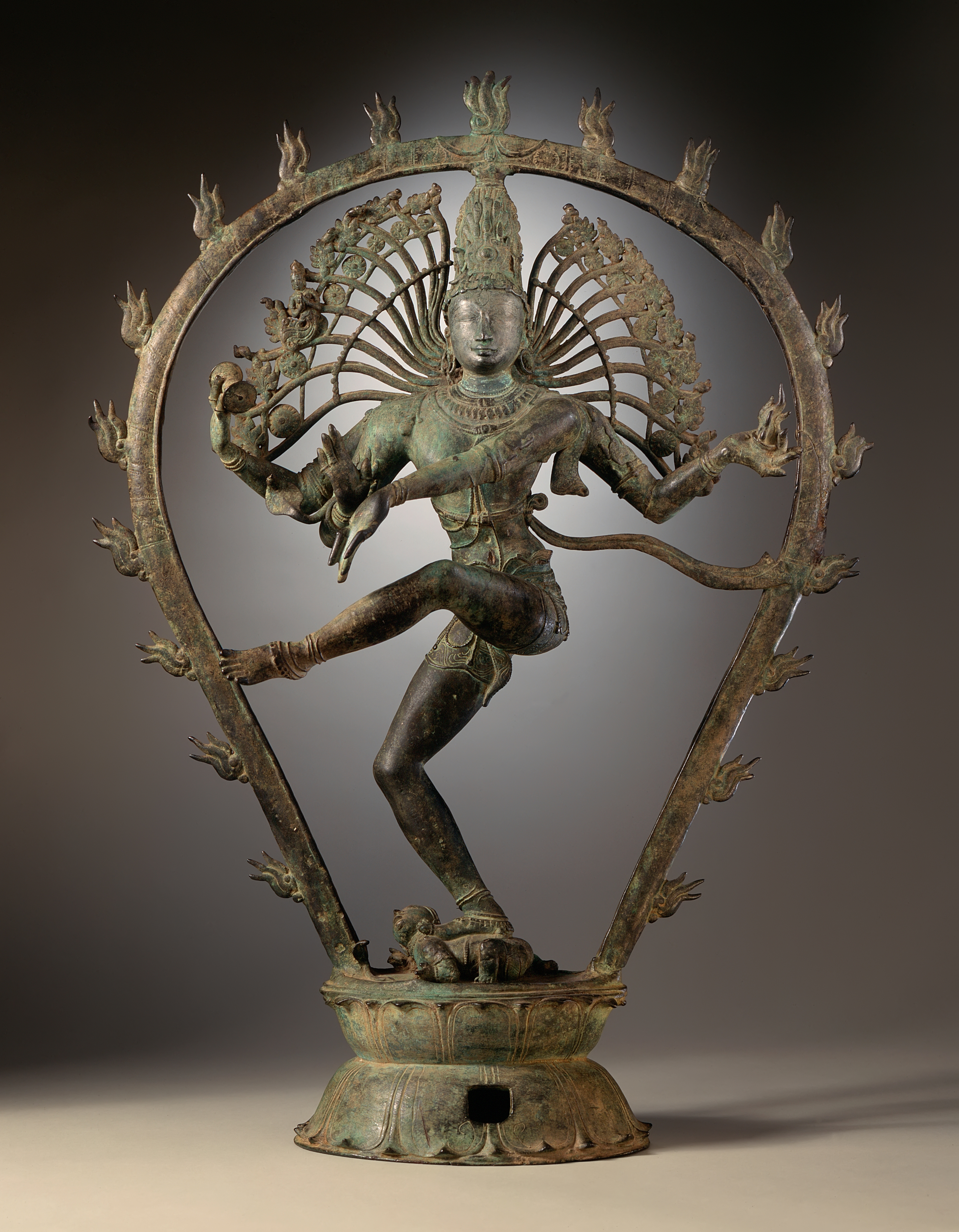
- Shiva as the Lord of Dance

Based on the study of Natya Shastra text, the common Indian grammar of performing arts and literature is referred to as Marga in the post-Natyashastra period. Deshis are regional forms of performing arts, many of which are developed based on regional taste.

== Major Research ==
Marga Natya is the revival and reconstruction of Bharata (sage)’s tradition of dance, music and acting (natya, geeta and abhinaya) as mentioned in his Natya Shastra.

Researcher Piyal Bhattacharya has been working at the Natyashastra with the support of the Sangeet Natak Akademi under their scheme of “Safeguarding Intangible Cultural heritage of India”.

== The Origin ==
The Nāṭyaśāstra describes the origins of Marga Natya within a cosmological framework. According to Bharata (sage)'s account, during the transition from the Krita (Satya) Yuga (Golden Age) under Svāyambhuva Manu to the Treta Yuga (Silver Age) under Vaivasvata Manu, human society in Jambudvīpa experienced an increase in worldly preoccupations known as Grāmya Dharma. This shift brought forth various emotional states including joy, grief, jealousy, anger, and desire, which created mental disturbances that interfered with the concentration necessary for Vedic learning.

Recognizing this societal challenge, Indra and the other deities sought assistance from Brahma to develop a solution for the people of Jambudvipa . They requested the creation of an entertainment form (Krīḍanīyaka) that would be both visually and auditorily engaging while serving as a vehicle for transmitting Vedic wisdom and promoting spiritual awareness.

The divine request emphasized the need for an art form that would be universally accessible, transcending the traditional restrictions of caste hierarchy. Unlike Vedic study, which was limited to the upper three varṇas, this new medium was intended to be "sārvavarṇika" (accessible to all castes), including Brāhmaṇas, Kṣatriyas, Vaiśyas, and Śūdras, thereby democratizing access to spiritual knowledge through artistic expression.

पूर्वं कृतयुगे विप्रा वृत्ते स्वायंभुवेऽन्तरे ।

त्रेतायुगेऽथ सम्प्राप्ते मनोर्वैवस्वतस्य तु ॥ NS – 1.08

ग्राम्यधर्मप्रवृत्ते तु कामलोभवशं गते ।

ईर्ष्याक्रोधादिसंमूढे लोके सुखितदुःखिते ॥ NS – 1.09

देवदानवगन्धर्वयक्षरक्षोमहोरगैः ।

जम्बुद्वीपे समाक्रान्ते लोकपालप्रतिष्ठिते ॥ NS – 1.010

महेन्द्रप्रमुखैर्देवैरुक्तः किल पितामहः ।

क्रीडनीयकमिच्छामो दृष्यं श्रव्यं च यद्भवेत् ॥ NS – 1.011

न वेदव्यवहारोऽयं संश्राव्यः शूद्रजातिषु ।

तस्मात्सृजापरं वेदं पञ्चमं सार्ववर्णिकम् ॥ NS – 1.012

एवमस्त्विति तानुक्त्वा देवराजं विसृज्य च ।

सस्मार चतुरो वेदान्योगमास्थाय तत्त्ववित् ॥ NS – 1.013

== Major Researchers ==
Piyal Bhattacharya

Sayak Mitra

Subhendu Ghosh

Deep Ghosh

Akash Mallick

Rik Amrit (Amritanath Bhattacharya)

== Sources ==
- Pandurang Vaman Kane (1971). History of Sanskrit Poetics. Motilal Banarsidass. ISBN 978-81-208-0274-2.
