= Eduard Yefimovich Alekseyev =

Russian ethnomusicologist

Eduard Yefimovich Alekseyev (4 December 1937 – 10 March 2021) was a Russian-born ethnomusicologist who had conducted extensive field research on traditional music in Siberia and other regions of the former Soviet Union. His research focuses on theoretical problems of mode and melodic intonation, timbre, and notations as well as on sociological and psychological aspects of musical perception. He has served as a chairman of the Folklore Commission of the Union of Soviet Composers from 1972 to 1992. He has also served as a director of the department of the General Theory of Folklore at the Moscow State Institute of Art Studies.

He graduated from the Moscow Conservatory under supervision of professor Leo A. Mazel and pursued his postdoctoral studies at the Moscow State Institute of Art Studies where his academic adviser was ethnomusicologist professor Viktor M. Beliaev. He earned his Kandidat degree (equivalent to Ph.D. in the USA) and Doctor of Sciences degree in Ethnomusicology from the Moscow State Institute of Art Studies.

Eduard Alekseyev is the author of more than 100 publications in Russian, including such monographs as A study of the origins of modality with regard to Yakut folk songs (1976), The nature of pitch in primitive singing (1986), Folklore in the context of modern culture (1988), and The notation of folk music: Theory and practice (1990).

His collection of fieldwork is held in the Archive of World Music in the Loeb Music Library at Harvard University. The collection contains "original field recordings by ethnomusicologist Eduard Yefimovich Alekseyev. The recordings were made in various regions in Russia, and primarily represent the musical culture of the Yakut (Sakha) peoples, as well of Crimean Tatar and Ukrainian peoples."

== Personal life ==
Since 1997 he resided in Boston, Massachusetts. He died there on March 10, 2021, at the age of 83.
