= Bharat Gupt =

Indian academic

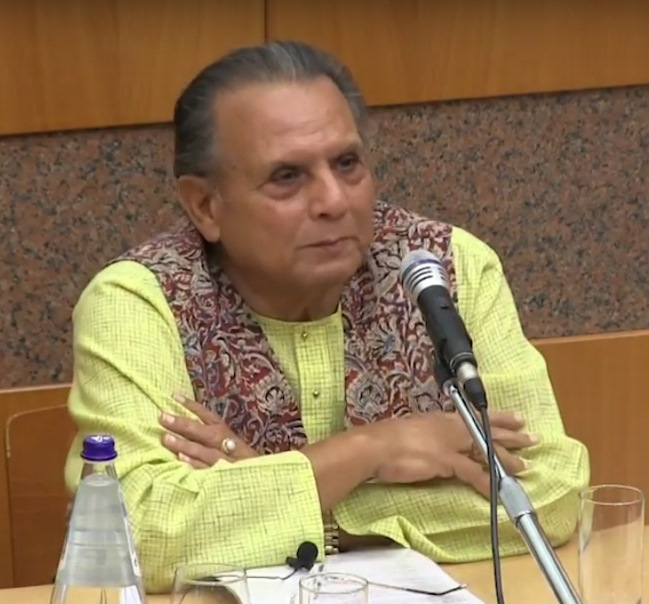
- Gupt in September 2019
- Born: November 28, 1946 (age 79); Moradabad, Uttar Pradesh, India
- Occupations: Classicist, musicologist, theatre theorist, academic
- Known for: Comparative study of Greek and Indian drama
- Awards: Padma Shri (2025); Sangeet Natak Akademi Award (2023)

Bharat Gupt (born 28 November 1946 in Uttar Pradesh) is an Indian classicist, theatre theorist, sitar and surbahar player, musicologist, cultural analyst and newspaper columnist. He is also a retired Professor in English, who taught at the College of Vocational Studies of the University of Delhi.

In January 2025, Gupt was honored with the Padma Shri, India's fourth-highest civilian award, by the Government of India.

In February 2023, he received the Sangeet Natak Akademi Award by the President of India for his contribution to musicology.

== Early life and education ==
Bharat Gupt was born in Moradabad (Uttar Pradesh, India). His parents moved in the early 1950s to Delhi, where he went to school and college and studied English, Hindi, Sanskrit, and philosophy. He then spent a year in the US in the late 1960s, and later moved to Canada to complete a master's degree from Toronto. Back in India, he learned to play the sitar and surbahar, training for eight years under the musician Pandit Uma Shankar Mishra. He also studied ancient Indian musicological texts and modern Indian Music, yoga sutras, and classics under Acharya K.C. Brihaspati and Swami Kripalvananda.

== Career ==
Trained both in modern European and traditional Indian educational systems, Gupt has worked in classical studies, theatre, music, culture, and media studies, and researched as a Senior Fellow of the Onassis Foundation in Greece on the revival of ancient Greek theatre.

From 1995 to 1996, he was invited by the Alexander S. Onassis Public Benefit Foundation, Greece for six months to research on Modern Greek Theatre Productions of Ancient Greek Plays. In 1995, he was also a member of the Jury for the International Onassis Prize for Drama.

Gupt retired as an associate professor of English at the College of Vocational Studies, University of Delhi. He has also directed major lectures and directed seminars. As part of his research material, he has made approximately 2000 photographs of amphitheaters and antiquities all over Greece as well as in Syracuse, Italy.

As a reviewer, he is a frequent contributor to the Journal of Sangeet Natak Academy, Journal of Music Academy Madras, Indian Musicological Society, and Baroda.

Gupt's practical involvement with traditional Indian temple architecture resulted in initiating the construction of the Ram Mandir in Ashok Vihar. In 2001, he was one of the founding members of the International Forum for India's heritage: IFIH is a network of scholars, educationists, artists, scientists, social workers, environmentalists, thinkers and writers, who have come together to promote India's cultural heritage.

He retired from the University of Delhi in November 2011, but continues to lecture at other forums.

== Writings and ideas ==
Much of Gupt's writing is devoted to classical Indian and classical Greek drama, comparing their similarities and differences and exploring the possibilities of common Indo-European origins. His first book, Dramatic Concepts – Greek and Indian (first published in 1994), was directly inspired by his Greek travels and studies. Dramatic Concepts compares ancient Greek and Indian dramatic theories. Instead of treating the Poetics and the Natyashastra as Western and Eastern viewpoints, it places them within the broad framework of ancient Indo-European culture and the art of sacred drama (hieropraxis). The book compares not only the concepts as propounded by Aristotle and Bharata Muni, but also attempts to reconstruct the Greek and Indian performances to highlight their similarities and differences.

== Books ==
- Dramatic Concepts Greek and Indian (1994)
- Natyashastra, Chapter 28: Ancient Scales of Indian Music (1996) [translation into English],
- Literary Criticism and Theory (Greek), Twelve Greek Poems into Hindi Indira Gandhi National Open University, Delhi (2001)
- India: A Cultural Decline or Revival? (2008)

== Published articles ==
- "The Technique of Allusion in the Poetry of T. S. Eliot." In Student's Handbook in American Literature. Ed. C. D. Narsimhaiah. Ludhiana Kalyani, 1972. 188–97.
- "Laxmi Narain Lal ka Abdulla Dewaana (in Hindi)." In Natak Aur Rang Manch. Ed. I. Madan. Delhi: Lipi Prakashan, 1975. 95–100.
- "Ravishena krita Padma Purana main Sangit Carca (in Hindi)." In Sangeet (monthly). Sangeet Karyalaya, Hathras. May 1981. 15–16.
- "Sangit ko Acharya Brihaspati ki den (in Hindi)." In Sangeet (monthly). Sangeet Karyalaya, Hathras. 6 articles. July–December, 1981.
- "Origin of Dhruvapada." In Sangeet Nataka, Journal of Sangeet Natak Academy. New Delhi.
- "Music in the Natyasastra." In Journal of the Music Academy, Madras. 56 (1985), 165–75; 57 (1986), 172–81; 58 (1987), 91–109; 59 (1988) 57–82; 60 (1989).
- "Valmiki's Ramayana and the Natyasastra." In Sangeet Natak. 81–82 (July–Dec. 1986) 63–76.
- "The Date of Natyasastra." Journal of the Oriental Institute of Baroda 36. 1–4 (Sept. 86 – June 87) 69–86.
- "Use of the Dhruva Songs in Ancient Indian Theatre." Journal of the Oriental Institute of Baroda 37 (March–June 1988) 305–20.
- "Classifications on Lokadharmi and Natyadharmi." Sangeet Natak 95. (Jan.-March 1990) 35–44.
- "Peace as Theatrical Experience." In Manascarya, Journal of Cultural Studies, North Eastern Hill University, Shillong, VOL. II, No. 2&3, 1996, pp 64–9
- "What is Ethnic." The Eastern Anthropologist, 50: 2. 1997, pp 139– 46.
- "Religious Plurality in Education." Globalization and Identity. Editors, Majid Tehraninan and B. Jeannie Lum. Transaction Publishers, UK/US. 2006, pp 55–62.
- "Laughter and Tears in Classical Indian Theater: Its Theoretical Frame" Dioniso, Indtituto Nazionale del Dramma Antico. DIONYSOS 2007, number 6, Journal of National Institute of Ancient Drama, Italy. pp 338–41.
- "Classical Indian Art Theory and its Present Day Worth" Shruti, Delhi, Vol 2, April 2008, pp 58–71

== Major public lectures on Natyashastra ==
- At Madras University
1. 9–13 March 2009 expounding on Sanskrit text and Abhinavabharati (25 hours) and the same at Kalakshetra, Chennai (Madras) February 2012.
- At Triveni Kala Sangam, New Delhi
1. 8–13 May 2009 expounding on Sanskrit text and Abhinavabharati (10 hours).

AT KALAKSHETRA CHENNAI 1. 6–10 Feb 2012, expounding on Sanskrit text and Abhinavabharati (25 hours)

== Major seminars directed ==
1. "Philosophy of Indian Drama", India International Centre, Delhi. 6–8 April. 2002 sponsored by ICPR
2. "Philosophy of Indian Music". At India International Centre Delhi 7–9 Feb. 2003 Sponsored by ICPR
3. "Arts and Culture for Indian Resurgence", at India International Centre, Delhi sponsored by IIC and Kalaikoodam Center of Arts. 1–3 August 2008
