= Dalibor Davidović =

Dalibor Davidović (born 3 January 1972 in Našice) is a musicologist and university professor.

Davidović studied musicology at the Zagreb Music Academy (B.A. and M.A.) and obtained his PhD from the University of Hamburg.

His principal areas of research are systematic musicology and aesthetics of music. He published extensively on the epistemological problems of the music studies. In his book Identity and Music: Between Criticism and Technique he explores the contemporary music scholarship concerned with identity politics. His recent research has been focused on the notion of anarchy in the work of John Cage, on the music ontology of Jewish philosopher Ivan Focht, and on the work of German artist Hans-Jürgen Syberberg.

He teaches at the Department of Musicology at the Music Academy in Zagreb. From 2016 to 2018 visiting researcher at Berlin University of the Arts. He translated into Croatian books on aesthetics and on philosophy of religion.

== Books ==
- Istraživanja recepcije u muzikologiji i njihovi izgledi (Reception Research in Musicology and its Prospects), Zagreb: Croatian Musicological Society, 2002, ISBN 953-6090-19-8
- Identität und Musik: Zwischen Kritik und Technik (Identity and Music: Between Criticism and Technique), Vienna: Mille Tre, 2006, ISBN 3-900198-09-8
- Nach dem Ende der Welt (After the End of the World), Rostock: Altstadt-Druck, 2020, ISBN 978-3-00-067826-4
- Syberberg, umjetnost uhom mišljena (Syberberg, Art Conceived By the Ear), Zagreb: Multimedijalni institut, 2025, ISBN 978-953-8469-15-2

== Articles ==
- Foucault hört hin, in: Andreas Holzer & Annegret Huber (eds.): Musikanalysieren im Zeichen Foucaults (= Anklaenge: Wiener Jahrbuch für Musikwissenschaft), Wien: Mille Tre, 2014, pp. 55-68, ISBN 978-3-900198-39-8
- Branches, Musicological Annual 51 (2015) 2, 9-25. ISSN 0580-373X (On the notion of anarchy in the work of John Cage)

== Translations ==
- Alexander García Düttmann: Visconti: Uvidi u krvi i mesu (Visconti: Insights into Flesh and Blood), Zagreb: Blok, 2006, ISBN 953-95317-0-5
- Christoph Menke: Prisutnost tragedije: Ogled o sudu i igri (The Presence of Tragedy: An Essay on Judgement and Play), Beograd – Zagreb: Beogradski krug – Multimedijalni institut, 2008, ISBN 978-953-7372-03-3
- Jacob Taubes: Zapadna eshatologija (Occidental Eschatology), Zagreb: Antibarbarus, 2009, ISBN 978-953249095-4
