= N. Ramanathan =

Professor N. Ramanathan (born 1946) is a musicologist in India. He taught and guided research in the Department of Indian Music at the University of Madras since 1978, and retired in 2004.

== Biography ==
He obtained a bachelor's degree in Violin (South Indian Art Music) from Sri Venkateswara University, Tirupati, and obtained his master's and Ph.D. degree in musicology at the Banaras Hindu University, Varanasi.

He has produced many publications and has presented papers at seminars on the Sangita Ratnakara and the Brhaddesi.

== Major publications ==
- Musical Forms in the Sangita Ratnakara. Sampradaya, Chennai, 1999
- Vadi, Samvadi, Anuvadi, and Vivadi Svaras. Journal of the Music Academy, Madras, 1983
- Influence of Sastra on Prayoga: The Svara System in the Post-Sangitaratnakara Period with special reference to south Indian music. The traditional Indian theory and practice of music and dance by Jonathan Katz.
