= List of Delta Omicron members =

Delta Omicron is a co-ed international professional music honors fraternity. It has three types of members: collegiate, patron, and national honorary members. The national board of directors recognizes musicians who attain outstanding recognition in the field with a national honorary membership. The board may also give a patron or patroness membership to musicians who have attained a national reputation in their field or to nationally recognized patrons of music. Following are some of its notable members.

Name	Member type	Induction date	Induction location	Notability	Ref.
Bruce Abel	Patron	1974	Cleveland, Ohio	Baritone	
Claudio Arrau	Patron	1943	Louisville, Kentucky	Pianist	
Dorothy Ashby	National honorary	1972	Detroit, Michigan	Harpist and composer	
Milton Babbitt	Patron	October 9, 2000	New York City, New York	Composer	
Joseph Banowetz	Patron	1973	Mount Pleasant, Michigan	Pianist	
Samuel Barber	Patron	1960	New York City, New York	Composer	
Evelyn Rothwell Barbirolli	National honorary	1965	Houston, Texas	Oboist	
John Barbirolli	Patron	1965	Houston, Texas	Conductor	
Edmund Battersby	Patron	2001 or March 27, 2007	Jefferson City, Tennessee	Pianist	
Gisele Ben-Dor	National honorary	1995	Englewood Cliffs, New Jersey	Conductor	
Jack Beeson	Patron	1971	Philadelphia, Pennsylvania	Composer and educator	
Jean Berger	Patron	1980	Denver, Colorado	Composer	
Philip Bezanson	Patron	1962	Chicago, Illinois	Composer and educator	
Ingrid Bjoner	National honorary	1968	Philadelphia, Pennsylvania	Soprano	
Frances Blaisdell	National honorary	1941	New York City, New York	Flutist and educator	
Joseph Bloch	Patron	1962	New York City, New York	Pianist and educator	
Jean Tennyson Boissevain	National honorary			Soprano	
William Bolcom	Patron	1989 or July 2006	Ann Arbor, Michigan	Composer and pianist	
Gena Branscombe	National honorary	1925	New York City, New York	Composer and conductor	
Anshel Brusilow	Patron	1972	Maryville, Tennessee	Conductor	
Fritz Busch	Patron	1948	Cincinnati, Ohio	Conductor	
Ernest Charles	Patron	1941	Lincoln, Nebraska	Composer	
Constance Cherry	Patron	February 2013	Jefferson City, Tennessee	Educator	
Loris Chobanian	Patron	1990	Kent, Ohio	Composer	
Lili Chookasian	National honorary	1955	Chicago, Illinois	Contralto	
Curtis Clark	Patron	1984	Kent, Ohio	Pianist and impresario	
Joseph W. Clokey	Patron	1939	Oxford, Ohio	Educator and composer	
Michael Colgrass	Patron	1991	Akron, Ohio	Composer	
Fiora Contino	National honorary	1974	Bloomington, Indiana	Conductor	
Dominic Cossa	Patron	1971	Cincinnati, Ohio	Bass	
Hollis Dann	Patron	1925		Educator	
Norman Dello Joio	Patron	1967	Cincinnati, Ohio	Composer	
Nickitas Demos	Patron	July 2012		Composer	
Joerg Demus	Patron	1955	Cincinnati, Ohio	Pianist	
Misha Dichter	Patron	April 13, 1999	Jefferson City, Tennessee	Pianist	
Fannie Charles Dillon	National honorary	1925	Los Angeles, California	Composer	
Walt Disney	Patron	1940	Los Angeles, California	Producer	
Olin Downes	Patron	1939	New York City, New York	Critic	
John Downey	Patron	1980	Milwaukee, Wisconsin	Composer	
Sophie H. Drinker	National honorary	1951	Philadelphia, Pennsylvania	Musicologist and author	
Marcel Dupré	Patron	1937	Bloomington, Illinois	Organist	
Cecil Effinger	Patron	1957	Denver, Colorado	Composer, inventor, and educator	
Halim El-Dabh	Patron	1990	Kent, Ohio	Composer	
Robert Elmore	Patron	1965	Philadelphia, Pennsylvania	Organist and composer	
Georges Enesco	Patron			Violinist	
Simon Estes	Patron	1979	Chicago, Illinois	Bass-baritone	
JoAnn Falletta	National honorary	1988	Milwaukee, Wisconsin	Conductor	
Ray Ferguson	Patron	1976	Detroit, Michigan	Organist	
Wilhelmenia Fernandez	National honorary	1983	Detroit, Michigan	Soprano	
Francis Findlay	Patron	1934		Educator	
Birgit Finnila	National honorary	1973	Chicago, Illinois	Contralto	
Harvey S. Firestone Jr.	Patron	1939		Philanthropist	
Carlisle Floyd	Patron	1961	Columbia, South Carolina	Composer and educator	
Eugene Fodor	Patron	1978	Washington, D.C.	Violinist	
Henry Ford	Patron	1939		Philanthropist	
Lukas Foss	Patron	1982	New York City, New York	Conductor and composer	
Virgil Fox	Patron	1958	Westminster, Maryland	Organist	
Vera Franceschi	National honorary	1955	Chicago, Illinois	Pianist	
Ossip Gabrilowitsch	Patron	1921	Cincinnati, Ohio	Conductor and pianist	
James Galway	Patron	1991	Columbus, Ohio	Flutist	
Mary Garden	Patron	1932	Cincinnati, Ohio	Soprano	
Vance George	Patron	April 3, 2008	Washington, Pennsylvania	Conductor	
Armando Ghitalla	Patron	1988	Ann Arbor, Michigan	Trumpeter	
Vittorio Giannini	Patron	1953	Cincinnati, Ohio	Composer and educator	
David Gillingham	Patron	1996	Normal, Illinois	Composer	
Joseph Gingold	Patron	1989	Bloomington, Illinois	Violinist	
Richard Franko Goldman	Patron	1964	New York City, New York	Composer, author, and conductor	
Eugene Goossens	Patron	1925	Rochester, New York	Conductor	
Camargo Guarnieri	Patron	1973	Sao Paulo, Brazil	Composer	
Ida Haendel	National honorary	1986	Dallas, Texas	Volinist	
Richard Hageman	Patron	1926		Composer	
Robert Hale	Patron	1971	Cincinnati, Ohio	Baritone	
Howard Hanson	Patron	1925	Rochester, New York	Composer, educator, and conductor	
Louis Hasselmans	Patron	1940	Baton Rouge, Louisiana	Conductor	
Evelyn Lear	National honorary	1989	Chicago, Illinois	Soprano	
Walter Hendl	Patron	December 1, 1960	Chicago, Illinois	Conductor and educator	
Ethel Glenn Hier	National honorary	1924	Columbus, Ohio	Composer and pianist	
Ima Hogg	Patron	1971	Houston, Texas	Philanthropist	
Lorin Hollander	Patron	1974	Milwaukee, Wisconsin	Pianist	
Stanley Hollingsworth	Patron	1988	Rochester, Michigan	Composer	
David Holsinger	Patron	1998	San Antonio, Texas	Composer and conductor	
Hal Hopson	Patron	1988	Nashville, Tennessee	Composer	
Karel Husa	Patron	1977	Milwaukee, Wisconsin	Composer and conductor	
Donald Hustad	Patron	1994	Jefferson City, Tennessee	Organist, composer, arranger, and educator	
Roger Jacobi	Patron	1980	Interlochen, Michigan	Educator	
Grant Johannesen	Patron	1982	Cleveland, Ohio	Pianist	
Camellia Johnson	National honorary	1925	Jefferson City, Tennessee	Soprano	
Thor Johnson	Patron	1947	Cincinnati, Ohio	Conductor and educator	
Vakhtang Jordania	Patron	1988	Chattanooga, Tennessee	Conductor	
Martin Katz	Patron	1985	Sarasota, Florida	Pianist and educator	
Graham Kendrick	Patron	February 2013		Contemporary worship artist	
Hans Kindler	Patron	1945		Conductor	
Tom Krause	Patron	1969	Philadelphia, Pennsylvania	Baritone	
Rafael Kubelík	Patron	1951	Chicago, Illinois	Conductor	
Gail Kubik	Patron	1960	Lawrence, Kansas	Composer	
Erich Kunzel	Patron	1993	Cincinnati, Ohio	Conductor	
Fredell Lack	National honorary	1963	Beaumont, Texas	Violinist and educator	
Hans Lange	Patron	1940		Conductor	
Benjamin Lees	Patron	1965	New York City, New York	Composer and educator	
J. Reilly Lewis	Patron	2010		Organist and choirmaster of the National Cathedral	
Martha Lipton	National honorary	1943	Cincinnati, Ohio	Mezzo-soprano and educator	
Frank Little	Patron	1977	Johnson City, Tennessee	Tenor	
Hugh Livingston	Patron	November 6, 2003	Maryville, Tennessee	Composer and pianist	
Normand Lockwood	Patron	1980	Denver, Colorado	Composer	
Jesús López-Cobos	Patron	1992	Cincinnati, Ohio	Conductor	
George Lynn	Patron	1974	Fort Collins, Colorado	Composer	
Joseph E. Maddy	Patron	1934		Educator and conductor	
Spiro Malas	Patron	1971	Cincinnati, Ohio	Baritone	
Nicolai Malko	Patron	1943	Chicago, Illinois	Conductor	
Robert Marcellus	Patron	1980	Interlochen, Michigan	Educator and conductor	
Andre Marchal	Patron	1954	Cincinnati, Ohio	Organist	
Jean Martinon	Patron	1967	Chicago, Illinois	Conductor	
David Maslanka	Patron	1996	Normal, Illinois	Composer	
William Mayer	Patron	1964	New York City, New York	Composer	
James McCray	Patron	1981	Fort Collins, Colorado	Composer and educator	
Sylvia McNair	National honorary	1985	Atlanta, Georgia	Soprano	
Sherrill Milnes	Patron	1990	Urbana, Illinois	Baritone	
Yvonne Minton	National honorary	1975	Chicago, Illinois	Mezzo-soprano	
Donald Neuen	Patron	1977	Jefferson City, Tennessee	Educator and conductor	
Geoffrey O'Hara	Patron	1938		Composer	
Paul Paray	Patron	1946	Cincinnati, Ohio	Conductor	
Luciano Pavarotti	Patron	1978	Washington, D.C.	Tenor	
Vincent Persichetti	Patron	1946	Kent, Ohio	Composer	
Gregor Piatagorsky	Patron	1944	Louisville, Kentucky	Cellist	
Paul Plishka	Patron	1985	Detroit, Michigan	Baritone	
John Pozdro	Patron	1960	Lawrence, Kansas	Educator and composer	
Eve Queler	National honorary	1979	Detroit, Michigan	Conductor	
Florence Quivar	National honorary	1980	Los Angeles, California	Mezzo-soprano	
Samuel Ramey	Patron	1980	Washington, D.C.	Bass	
Robert Rayfield	Patron	December 1, 1976	Chicago, Illinois	Organist	
Fritz Reiner	Patron	1920	Cincinnati, Ohio	Conductor	
Bernard Rogers	Patron	1960	Lawrence, Kansas	Composer and educator	
Fred Rogers	Patron	1996	Pittsburgh, Pennsylvania	Educator, producer, and musician	
Gianna Rolandi	National honorary	1986	Spartanburg, South Carolina	Soprano	
Stella Roman	National honorary	1943	Chicago, Illinois	Soprano	
Julius Rudel	Patron	1971	Cincinnati, Ohio	Conductor and opera director	
John Rutter	Patron	1985	Jefferson City, Tennessee	Composer and conductor	
Carlos Salzedo	Patron	1926		Harpist	
Clara Clemens Samossoud	National honorary	1921	Detroit, Michigan	Contralto	
David P. Sartor	Patron	July 17, 2009		Composer and conductor	
Arlene Saunders	National honorary	1971	Cincinnati, Ohio	Soprano	
Bidu Sayão	National honorary	1939	Cincinnati, Ohio	Soprano	
Thomas Scherman	Patron	1965	New York City, New York	Conductor	
Kenneth Schermerhorn	Patron	1970	Milwaukee, Wisconsin	Conductor	
Tito Schipa	Patron	1940	Beverly Hills, California	Tenor	
Thomas Schippers	Patron	1971	Cincinnati, Ohio	Conductor	
William Schuman	Patron	1968	New York City, New York	Composer and administrator	
Elisabeth Schwarzkopf	National honorary	1954	Chicago, Illinois	Soprano	
Irmgard Seefried	National honorary	1953	Chicago, Illinois	Soprano	
Robert Shaw	Patron	1969	Cincinnati, Ohio	Conductor	
George Shirley	Patron	1972	Detroit, Michigan	Tenor	
Beverly Sills	Patron	May 1, 1971	Cincinnati, Ohio	Soprano	
Henry Sopkin	Patron	1953	Chicago, Illinois	Conductor	
Albert Spalding	Patron	1938		Violinist	
Oley Speaks	Patron	1939		Composer	
Susan Starr	National honorary	1964	Philadelphia, Pennsylvania	Pianist and educator	
Eleanor Steber	National honorary	1943	Chicago, Illinois	Soprano and educator	
Ruth Slenczynska	National honorary	1956	New York City, New York	Pianist, author, and educator	
Teresa Stich-Randall	National honorary	1966	New York City, New York	Soprano	
William Stone	Patron	April 1, 2003	Jefferson City, Tennessee	Baritone	
Gustave Strube	Patron	1932		Conductor and composer	
Shinichi Suzuki	Patron	1997	Johnson City, Tennessee (via phone)	Musician, educator, and founder of the Suzuki Method of Teaching	
Toshio Takahashi	Patron	1997	Johnson City, Tennessee	Musician, flutist, educator, and founder of the Suzuki Flute Institute	
Carl Tanner	Patron	August 8, 2005	Santa Fe, New Mexico	Tenor	
Deems Taylor	Patron	1939	New York City, New York	Composer and critic	
Alexander Tcherepnin	Patron	1939	New York City, New York	Composer and pianist	
Renata Tebaldi	National honorary	1957	Chicago, Illinois	Soprano	
Henri Temianka	Patron	1961	Lawrence, Kansas	Violinist and educator	
John Charles Thomas	Patron	1940	Oxford, Ohio	Baritone	
Virgil Thomson	Patron	1957	Milwaukee, Wisconsin	Composer	
Kerstin Thorborg	National honorary	1939	Columbus, Ohio	Contralto	
James Tocco	Patron	1990	Middletown, Ohio	Pianist	
Noel Tredinnick	Patron	1988	Jefferson City, Tennessee	Conductor	
Norman Treigle	Patron	1971	Cincinnati, Ohio	Bass-baritone	
Barry Tuckwell	Patron	1988	Cincinnati, Ohio	Hornist	
Ramon Vinay	Patron	1948	Denver, Colorado	Tenor	
Frederica Von Stade	National honorary	1996	Brevard, North Carolina	Mezzo-soprano	
Reinald Werrenrath	Patron	1931		Baritone	
Paul W. Whear	Patron	1975	Huntington, West Virginia	Composer	
John White	Patron	December 11, 2005	Denver, Colorado	Composer, cellist, and author	
Robert Whitney	Patron	1950	Louisville, Kentucky	Conductor and educator	
Gavin Williamson	Patron	1954		Harpsichordist	
Beverly Wolff	Patron	1971	Cincinnati, Ohio	Mezzo-soprano	
Richard Yardumian	Patron	1967	Philadelphia, Pennsylvania	Composer and pianist	
Berj Zamkochian	Patron	1969	Normal, Illinois	Organist	
Efrem Zimbalist	Patron	1940	Georgetown, Kentucky	Violinist and educator	
