= Westminster Williamson Voices =

Coordinates: 40.2782°N 74.7354°W

- Origin: Princeton, New Jersey, United States
- Genres: Contemporary, classical
- Years active: 2003–present
- Label: Naxos Records
- Members: Conductor: James Jordan
- Website: Westminster Williamson Voices

The Westminster Williamson Voices is an ensemble that specializes in choral music. It is named for Westminster Choir College's founder, John Finley Williamson, who believed that choral music performed at the highest level should be accessible to all. The Choir is directed by conductor, pedagogue, and writer Dr.James Jordan

The repertoire and performances of the Westminster Williamson Voices cover a broad spectrum, with special emphasis on music commissioned for the choir. The choir has had music written for it by a number of composers including Morten Lauridsen, Paul Mealor, and James Whitbourn. Artistic collaborations with other art forms—dance, theater, and the visual arts—are at the core of the performances of this ensemble. The ensemble presents artistic repertoire of both traditional and non-traditional genres, tailored to establishing high standards of performance in choirs in churches, schools, and universities.

Williamson Voices' 2010–2011 season included concerts in Princeton and at Alice Tully Hall in Lincoln Center, New York City. Collaborations in both this season and past have included performances with Daniel Stewart and members of the Curtis Symphony Orchestra, and Rossen Milanov with the Princeton Symphony Orchestra.

On September 6, 2011, Williamson Voices' recording of music by James Whitbourn, produced by the composer, was released on Naxos. The album debuted on the Billboard Charts. The 2011–2012 season included concerts in Philadelphia at the Cathedral Church of Saints Peter and Paul, and in Princeton at the Princeton Meadow Church and Event Center. In May, 2012, the group recorded Whitbourn's Annelies, in its chamber version, released by Naxos in January 2013.

== Grammy Awards ==
On Friday, December 6, 2013, it was announced that the Williamson Voices had been a nominated for a Grammy Award in the "Best Choral Performance" category for their recording of James Whitbourn's, "Annelies". Also featured on the album are Dr.James Jordan, James Whitbourn (Composer and Producer), The Lincoln Trio, Bharat Chandra, and Arianna Zukerman. The award for this category was presented at the 56th Annual Grammy Awards on January 26, 2014.

== Pedagogical Significance ==
The Westminster Williamson Voices serves as a choral laboratory. Its primary musical mission is to explore new methods of teaching and rehearsing and to be at the forefront of choral education pedagogy. The teaching and learning of literature for performance use contemporary ensemble methods involving groundbreaking Aural Immersion Solfège and movement pedagogy emphasizing both the philosophies of Émile Jaques-Dalcroze and Rudolf von Laban. The ensemble also explores new avenues for the art of choral accompanying. The accompanist for the Westminster Williamson Voices assumes a new role, becoming the keystone for aural training for the choir. Consequently, its members gain valuable pedagogical tools to use in their life's work as teachers and professional choral singers. The choir, in addition to being an artistic performing ensemble, is available to serve as an ensemble-in-residence in schools, churches, universities and professional conferences throughout the United States.

== Choral Institute at Oxford (St. Stephen's House) ==
The Westminster Williamson Voices, in collaboration with their conductor James Jordan and regular collaborator James Whitbourn, began the Choral Music Institute in the summer of 2013. The program takes place annually, and occurs at St Stephen's House. This program allows conductors of all age ranges and abilities to study choral conducting and choral music with notable faculty including James Jordan, James Whitbourn, James O'Donnell, and many more. More information about the program can be found at the external link below.

== Recordings ==
- Angels in the Architecture (GIA Choralworks Series) (As the Voices of Anam Cara) 2010
- Living Voices (Naxos) 2011
- Annelies (Naxos) 2013
- Hole in the Sky (GIA) 2016
- Missa Carolae and Christmas Carols (Naxos) 2016
- Silence into Light (GIA) 2017
- Ola Gjeilo: Sunrise Mass (GIA) 2019
- Aurora (GIA) 2020
