= Schipa =

Schipa is a surname. Notable people with the surname include:

- Tito Schipa (1888–1965), Italian tenor
- Tito Schipa Jr. (born 1946), Portuguese-born Italian composer and singer-songwriter
