= Nanda Primavera =

Italian actress

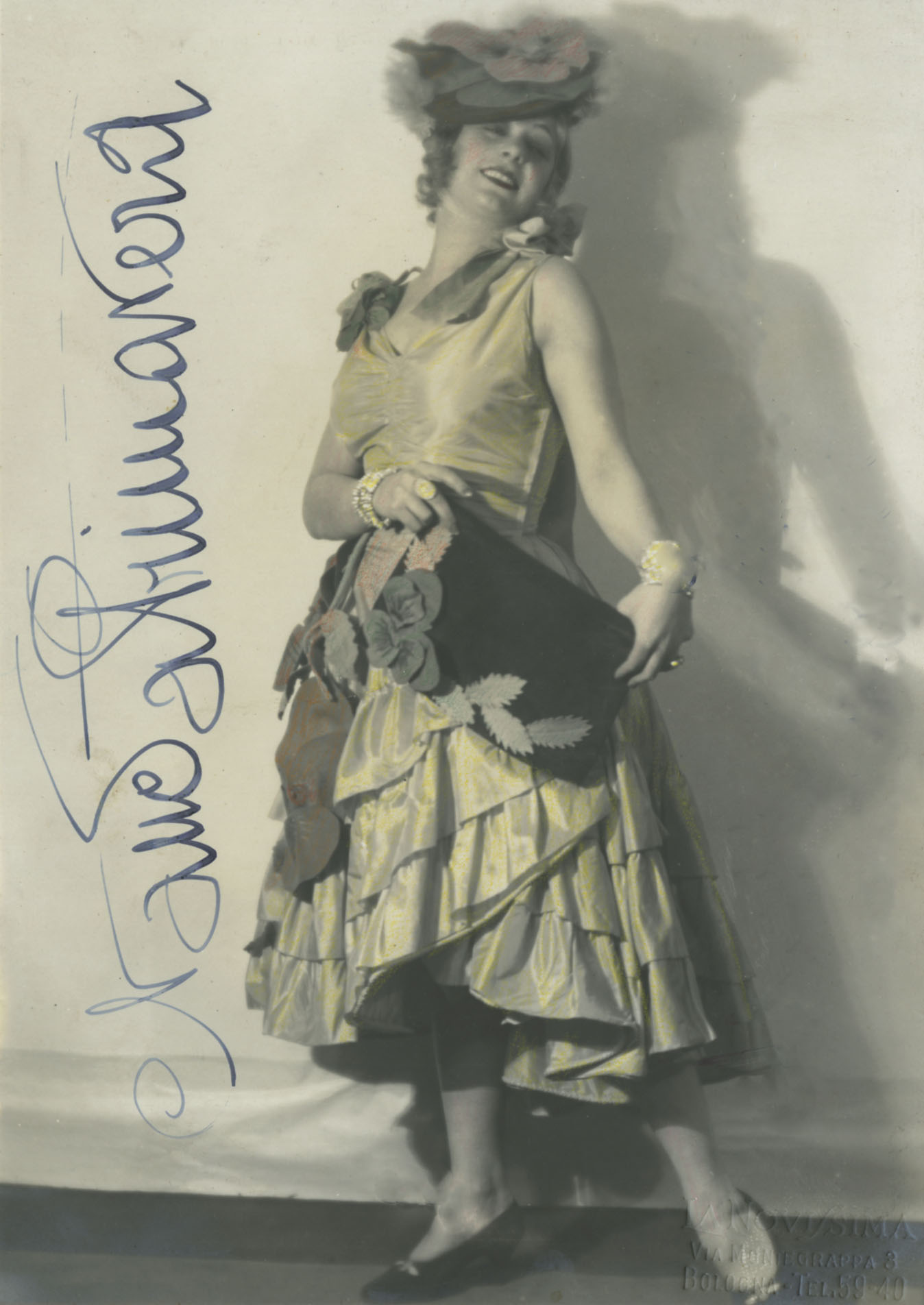
- Born: 23 August 1898; L'Aquila, Italy
- Died: 29 August 1995 (aged 97)
- Occupation: Actor
- Years active: 1936–1988

Nanda Primavera (23 August 1898 – 9 August 1995) was an Italian actress. She appeared in more than thirty films from 1936 to 1988.

In 1929, she created the title role in Tito Schipa's operetta La Principessa Liana.

== Filmography ==
Year	Title	Role	Notes
1936	Ginevra degli Almieri		
1940	Il signore della taverna		
1945	The Whole City Sings	La prima zia	
1952	L'ingiusta condanna	Ostessa	
1953	The Wayward Wife	La signora Foresi, madre di Gemma	
1955	Graziella	Donna Concetta	Uncredited
1955	Buonanotte... avvocato!	Donna Elvira	
1955	Non c'è amore più grande		
1955	Beautiful but Dangerous	Olimpia, Lina's mother	
1955	The Letters Page	Lady Eva's Mother	
1955	Desperate Farewell	Zia di Luisa	
1956	The Awakening		
1956	Moglie e buoi...		
1958	Toto and Marcellino	La portinaia Rosina	
1958	Sergente d'ispezione		
1959	La cambiale	Ottavio's Aunt	
1959	Il vedovo	Italia, Gioia's mother	
1960	Gastone	Flora	
1960	I piaceri dello scapolo	Madre di Evelina	
1960	Caccia al marito	Duke Massimo's Mother aka Rosalia Scauro	
1961	The Joy of Living	Margherita Gorgolano	
1962	Twist, lolite e vitelloni	Principessa Guidobalda Orselli	
1964	Napoleone a Firenze		
1965	I complessi	Erminia's Mother	(segment "Il Complesso della Schiava nubiana")
1966	Una rete piena di sabbia		
1968	Be Sick... It's Free	Guido's Mother	
1969	Zingara	Marisa and Silvia's mother	
1969	Il Prof. Dott. Guido Tersilli, primario della clinica Villa Celeste, convenzionata con le mutue	Tersilli's Mother	
1972	Meo Patacca	Calpurnia - old friend of Nuccia	
1973	La schiava io ce l'ho e tu no		
1974	Il domestico	Playing a tantalizing game of daring all by baring all	
1980	Bionda fragola		
1982	Cercasi Gesù		
1982	Scusa se è poco	Giovanna	
1983	Questo e Quello	Mother of Dora	(segment "Quello... col basco rosso")
1983	Se tutto va bene siamo rovinati	Zia Trieste	
