= Melanie Challenger =

British writer and broadcaster

- Education: Exeter College, Oxford.
- Occupations: Writer, researcher and broadcaster.
- Website: https://www.melaniechallenger.com/

Melanie Challenger is a British poet, philosopher, writer, librettist, and broadcaster whose work spans environmental history, the philosophy of biology, bioethics, and the relationship between humans and the living world.

Her nonfiction books include On Extinction: How We Became Estranged from Nature, which was published in 2011. It was selected by Publishers Weekly as one of the best nonfiction books of 2012 and received the Santa Barbara Library's Green Award for environmental writing. Her later books include How to Be Animal: What it Means to Be Human (2021) and Alive: The Hidden Intelligence of the Living World (2026). She also edited Animal Dignity: Philosophical Reflections on Non-Human Existence (2023). Her philosophical writing examines embodiment, biological agency, mortality, animal ethics, and human exceptionalism.

In 2026, Challenger became an Honorary Fellow in the Philosophy Department at Durham University, having previously been a Visiting Fellow. She has served as Deputy Co-Chair of the Nuffield Council on Bioethics, and is Vice President of the RSPCA, UK. She is also a founding Director of Animals in the Room, an initiative concerned with representing non-human animals in governance and decision-making. She became a National Geographic Explorer in 2025.

== Poetry and musical works ==
Challenger began her career in the arts, writing poetry and libretti. She has published two collections of poetry, Galatea, which won an Eric Gregory Award for poetry in 2005 and was shortlisted for the Forward Prize for Best First Collection. Her second collection, The Tender Map (2016), was illustrated by artist and archaeologist Rose Ferraby, who received the 2017 Michael Marks Award for Illustration for the work. Challenger's third collection, Dialogues of the Body and the Soul, is scheduled for publication by Guillemot Press in 2027.

Alongside her poetry, Challenger has written libretti for opera and choral music. In 2003, she adapted The Diary of Anne Frank for the Grammy-nominated choral work Annelies by James Whitbourn. As the librettist for British composer Mark Simpson, she provided the text for his oratorio, The Immortal, which won the 2016 South Bank Sky Arts Award for classical music and received its London premiere at the 2017 BBC Proms under Juanjo Mena. Their first opera together, Pleasure, was co-commissioned by Royal Opera House, Opera North and Aldeburgh Music.. She has also collaborated with composer Tarik O'Regan on a choral work drawing on young people's wartime diaries.

== Philosophical writing and research ==
Challenger's philosophical work explores embodiment, the nature of living beings, biological agency, mortality and the ethical implications of human relationships with other species. Her books How to Be Animal (2021) and Alive (2026) examine human exceptionalism and the relationship between intelligence, agency and embodied life. She edited Animal Dignity: Philosophical Reflections on Non-Human Existence (2023), an interdisciplinary collection addressing the ethical status of non-human animals.

Her research has included fellowships at Durham University's Department of Philosophy and the Hannah Arendt Center for Politics and the Humanities, as well as an affiliation with the Hastings Center for Bioethics. In 2026, she became an Honorary Fellow in the Department of Philosophy at Durham University.

Her applied ethics work includes Animals in the Room, which develops approaches to including non-human animals in governance and decision-making. She also presents The Psychosphere, a podcast exploring intelligence, consciousness, and agency in the living world.

== Publications ==
=== Poetry ===
- Galatea (2006), Salt Publishing.
- The Tender Map (2016), Guillemot Press, illustrated by Rose Ferraby.

=== Nonfiction and edited works ===
- Stolen Voices: Young People's War Diaries, from World War I to Iraq (2006), co-edited with Zlata Filipović.
- On Extinction: How We Became Estranged from Nature (2011).
- How to Be Animal: What It Means to Be Human (2021).
- Animal Dignity: Philosophical Reflections on Non-Human Existence (2023), editor, Bloomsbury Academic.
- Alive: The Hidden Intelligence of the Living World (2026), Canongate Books.

=== Forthcoming ===
- Dialogues of the Body and the Soul (2027), Guillemot Press.
