= La Principessa Liana =

Italian language operetta by Tito Schipa premiered in 1929

- Operetta by Tito Schipa
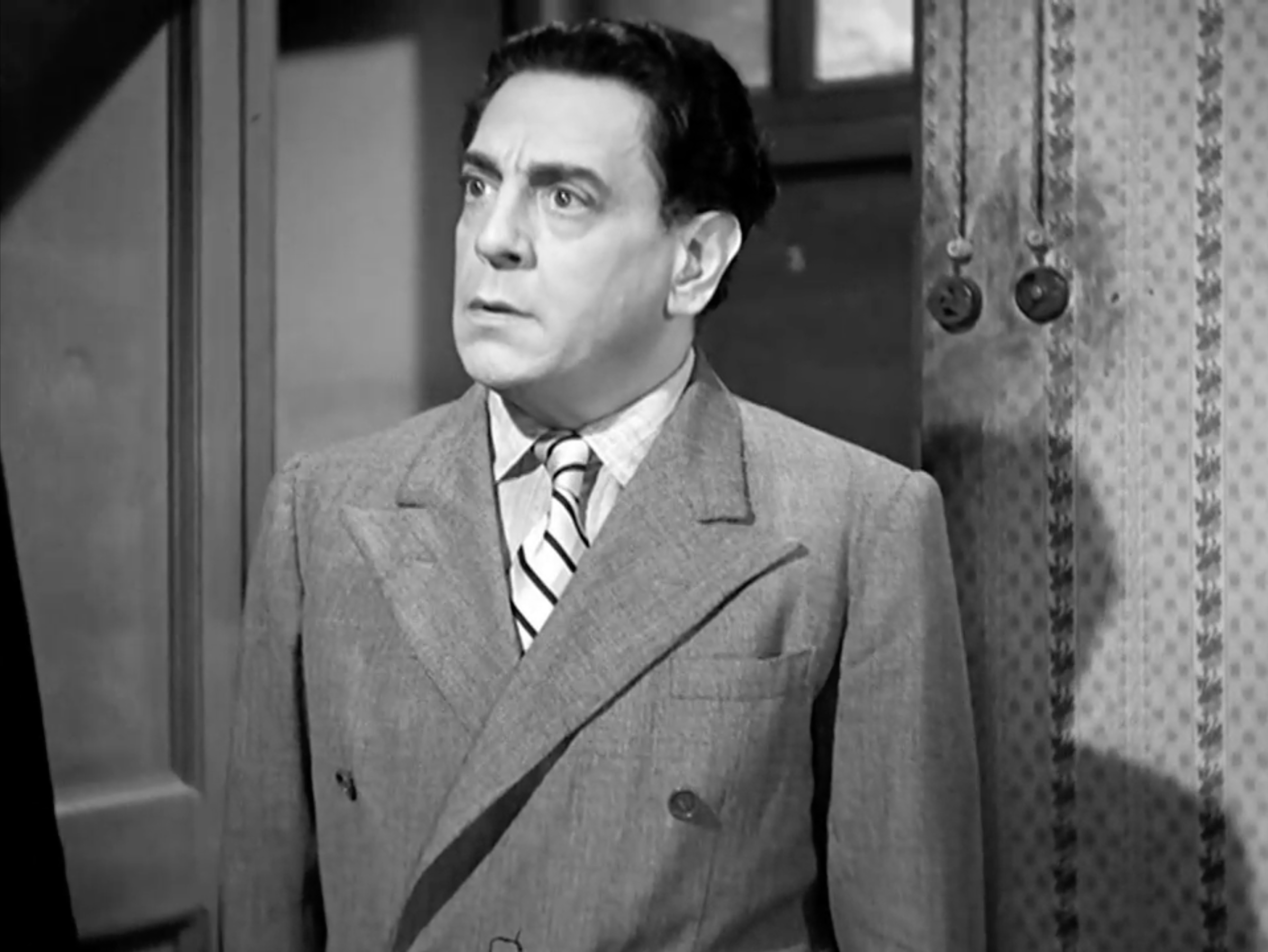
- Tito Schipa
- Translation: Princess Liana
- Librettist: Alcide Santoro, Ennio Neri
- Language: Italian
- Premiere: 22 June 1929 (Note: A 1930 article in Musica d'Oggi and Tito Schipa, Jr.'s biography of his father both give June 22 as the premiere date but the New Grove Dictionary of Opera says the premiere was June 2.); Teatro Adriano, Rome

La Principessa Liana (Princess Liana) is a three-act operetta in Italian composed by the tenor Tito Schipa with a libretto by Alcide Santoro and Ennio Neri. The comedy premiered in Rome at the Teatro Adriano on June 22, 1929. Schipa spent seven years writing the operetta, which was originally called Mimi. Schipa dedicated the opera to his daughter Liana, born three weeks before the opera's premiere.

== Synopsis ==
=== Act One ===
Princess Liana's castle, near Rome, 1920s

Princess Liana has inherited the castle of her father, Prince Disposti. She employs a maid, Lulú. The banker, Pilade Reali, plans to sell the castle. Wilfredo, the banker's son, is in love with Liana and seeks to marry her. The Golden Scarab, a former lover of Wilfredo, would like to reconcile. Zozó desires Liana to join his circus while Liana's aunt, the Baroness Clotilde, wants Liana to go gambling with her at the Monte Carlo Casino. Liana chooses to go with her aunt.

=== Act Two ===
Monte Carlo Casino

Clotilde wins 500,000 francs at roulette. Prince Orloff, who claims to be a member of the Russian royal family, tries to woo Liana. Wilfredo arrives and renews his courtship of Liana. Liana accepts him. The Golden Scarab and Wilfredo's father scheme to break up the couple and succeed. Wilfredo's father announces he is disinheriting his son and that he will marry Lulú. Liana and Clotilde, having lost their winnings, agree to perform in Zozó's circus.

=== Act Three ===
Backstage at the circus

Clotilde's dancing is booed by the circus audience. Liana is preparing to go on, riding a white horse. Lulú tells Liana that Wilfredo loves her and wanted to marry her even at the risk of being disinherited. Liana goes on and her equestrian act is a success. When she returns backstage, Wilfredo is there and professes his love. The Golden Scarab tells Liana and Wilfredo of her schemes. Liana and Wilfredo head back to her castle, singing of their love.

== Roles ==
Roles, voice types, 1929 premiere
Role	Voice type	Teatro Adriano, Rome, 1929	Lecce, 1935
La Principessa Liana		Nanda Primavera	Iris Adami Corradetti
Lulú			Margherita Carosio
Scarabeo d'oro			Marisa Merlo
La Baronessa Clotilde			Edmea Pollini
Wilfredo			Ettore Parmeggiani
Zozó			Ernesto Badini
Il Banchieri Pilade Reali			Eraldo Coda
Un Damerino			Giueseppi Nessi
Il direttore del circo equestre			Natale Villa
Il Principe Wladimiro Orloff			Giuseppe Antonicelli
Max			Renato Bellini
Il segretario			Dante Leuzzi

== Performances ==
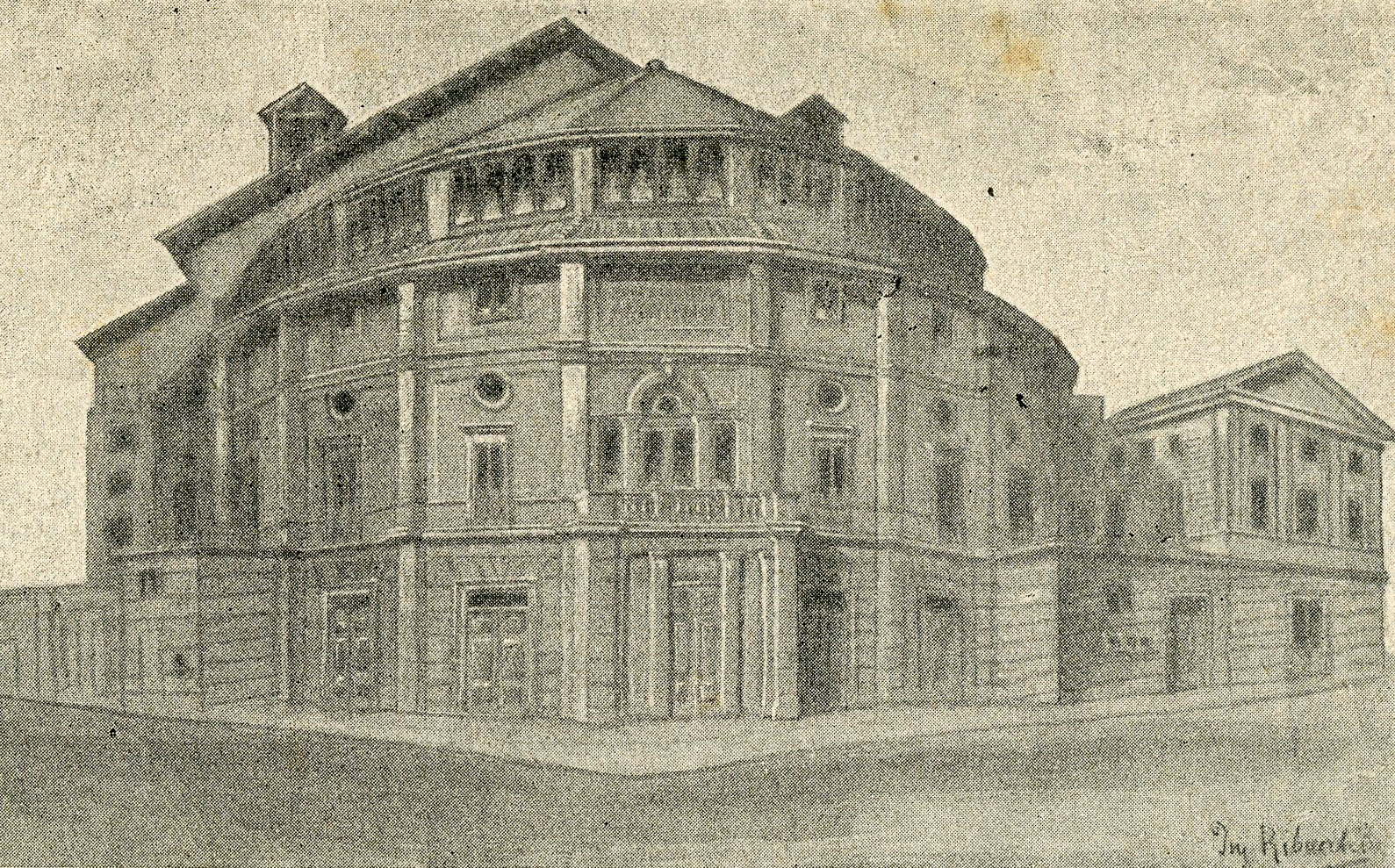
The Teatro Adriano in 1895

A private concert performance of Liana was given in New York City on April 30, 1929; Schipa sailed for Italy the next day for the public premiere.

Nanda Primavera created the title role in the June 22, 1929 premiere in Rome. At that performance, Schipa was summoned for twenty-five curtain calls. Time said Liana was a "success: immediate." London's Morning Post called the premiere a "success" with "a return to light operatic methods" which "sounds a note of sentiment and romance. It is rich in melody, and several of the duets are sure to become popular because of their tunefulness." The Musical Courier called Liana an "immense and enviable success . . . The music is flowing and melodious and the orchestration extremely clever."

Liana was given in 1935 at Milan's Teatro Lirico on May 1, and in the composer's hometown of Lecce on June 6, both performances conducted by Schipa. The Milan performance was called a "triumph."

The next year Schipa conducted a performance at Turin's Teatro Vittorio Emanuele (now known as the Auditorium Rai di Torino). The performance at La Scala in 1936 was well received. Schipa conducted that performance but left the pit in the second act to go on stage to sing and to dance a tango.

Italy's national broadcaster Radio Audizioni Italiane aired the operetta on June 13, 1938. Iris Adami Corradetti sang the title role in a performance conducted by the composer.

The libretto was published in Milan.
