= Roy Harris =

American composer (1898–1979)

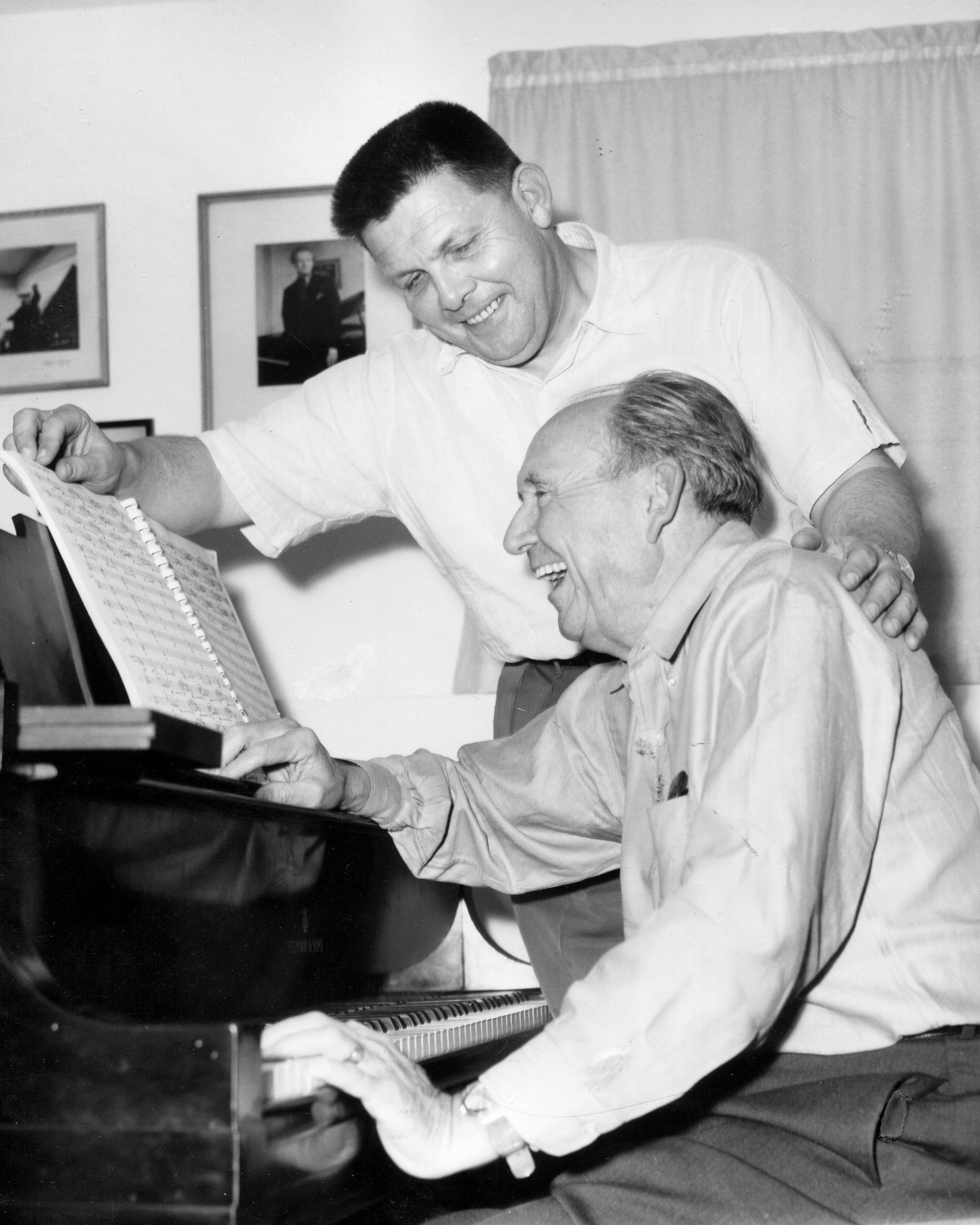
Harris (seated) playing piano with his former student George Lynn

Roy Ellsworth Harris (February 12, 1898 – October 1, 1979) was an American composer. He wrote music on American subjects, and is best known for his Symphony No. 3.

== Life ==
Harris was born in Chandler, Oklahoma on February 12, 1898. His ancestry was Scottish, Irish and Welsh. In 1903, his father was able to combine the proceeds of the auction of his Oklahoma homestead with his winnings from a lucky gambling streak to purchase some land near Covina in the San Gabriel Valley of southern California and move the family there. Roy Harris grew up as a farmer in this rural, isolated environment. He studied piano with his mother, and later clarinet. Though he studied at the University of California, Berkeley, he was still virtually self-taught when he began writing music of his own. In the early 1920s, he had lessons from Arthur Bliss (then in Santa Barbara) and the senior American composer and researcher of American Indian music, Arthur Farwell. Harris sold his farmland and supported himself as a truck-driver and delivery man for a dairy farm. Gradually, he made contacts in the East with other young composers, and, partly through Aaron Copland's recommendation, he was able to spend 1926–29 in Paris, as one of the many young Americans who received their final musical grooming in the masterclasses of Nadia Boulanger. Harris had no time for Boulanger's neoclassical, Stravinsky-derived aesthetic, but under her tutelage he began his lifelong study of Renaissance music, and wrote his first significant work: the Concerto for Piano, Clarinet and String Quartet.

After suffering a serious back injury, Harris was obliged to return for treatment to the United States, where he formed associations with Howard Hanson at the Eastman School of Music in Rochester and, more importantly, with Serge Koussevitsky at the Boston Symphony Orchestra. These associations secured performance outlets for the large-scale works he was writing. In 1934, a week after its first performance under Koussevitsky, his Symphony '1933' became the first American symphony to be commercially recorded. His work was also part of the music event in the art competition at the 1936 Summer Olympics.

It was his Symphony No. 3, however, first performed by Koussevitsky in 1939, which proved to be the composer's biggest breakthrough and made him practically a household name. Harris' Symphony No. 3 has been referred to as a candidate for "the Great American Symphony."

During the 1930s Harris taught at Mills College, Westminster Choir College (1934–1938) and the Juilliard School of Music. He spent most of the rest of his professional career restlessly moving through teaching posts and residencies at American colleges and universities. His final posts were in California, first at UCLA and then at California State University, Los Angeles. Among his pupils were William Schuman, H. Owen Reed, John Donald Robb, Robert Turner, Lorne Betts, George Lynn, John Verrall, Florence Price, Regina Hansen Willman, Peter Schickele (best known as the creator of P.D.Q. Bach) and Rudi Martinus van Dijk. He received many of America's most prestigious cultural awards, and at the end of his life was proclaimed Honorary Composer Laureate of the State of California.

In 1936 Harris married pianist Johana Harris (née Duffey), his junior by 14 years, who went on to a highly successful career, making numerous recordings and appearing as a soloist with almost every major American symphony orchestra. She also had a long career teaching on the piano faculty at the Juilliard School. Her name prior to their marriage was Beula Duffey, but Harris convinced her to change it to Johana after J.S. Bach. The Canadian Encyclopedia states, "Johana and Roy Harris were a tour de force in American music. Their collaboration has been compared to that of Robert and Clara Schumann. The Harrises organized concerts, adjudicated at festivals, and in 1959 founded the International String Congress. They promoted American folksong by including folksongs in their concerts and broadcasts." The couple had five children: Patricia, Shaun, Daniel, Maureen and Lane. Their two sons performed with The West Coast Pop Art Experimental Band, a Los Angeles-based psychedelic rock band of the late 1960s, and Roy Harris provided string arrangements on Shaun's self-titled solo album in 1973.

Harris was among he founders of the Music Academy of the West summer conservatory in 1947.

In September 1979, Harris was to have attended the performance of his Symphony No. 3 as part of an all-American program by the National Symphony Orchestra at the Kennedy Center, but he was unable to attend due to a fall, and he died shortly thereafter on October 1, 1979, at the age of 81.

== Character, reputation, and style characteristics ==
Harris was a champion of many causes. He founded the International String Congress to combat what was perceived as a shortage of string players in the U.S., and co-founded the American Composers Alliance. In 1958 the U.S. State Department sent him, along with some fellow composers including Peter Mennin and Roger Sessions, to the Soviet Union as a "cultural ambassador"; he was impressed by the support for composers that the Soviet state provided. He was a tireless organizer of conferences and contemporary music festivals and a frequent radio broadcaster. His last symphony, a commission for the American Bicentennial in 1976, was mauled by the critics at its first performance. This may have been due to its themes of slavery and the Civil War, which were in contrast to the celebratory mood of the country.

Although the rugged American patriotism of his works of the 1930s and 1940s is reflected in his research into and use of folk music (and to a lesser extent of jazz rhythms), Harris was paradoxically obsessed with the great European pre-classical forms, especially the fugue (which we hear in the Third Symphony) and passacaglia (as featured in the Seventh). His customary mode of musical discourse, with long singing lines and resonant modal harmonies, is ultimately based on his admiration for and development of Renaissance polyphony. He also used antiphonal effects, which he exploited brilliantly with a large orchestra. Like many American composers of his time, he was deeply impressed by the symphonic achievement of Sibelius. In Harris's best works the music grows organically from the opening bars, as if a tiny seed gives birth to an entire tree. This is certainly the case with the Third Symphony, which joined the American repertoire during the same era as works by Aaron Copland and Virgil Thomson. The first edition of Kent Kennan's The Technique of Orchestration (1952) quotes three passages from this symphony to illustrate good orchestral writing for cello, timpani, and vibraphone, respectively. The book quotes no other Harris symphonies. Few other American symphonies have acquired such a position in the standard performance repertory as has this one, due in large part to the championing of the piece by Leonard Bernstein, who recorded it twice.

Though Harris's symphonies are his greatest contribution to American music, he composed over 170 works, including many works for amateurs. His output includes works for band, orchestra, voice, chorus and chamber ensembles.

== Works ==
=== Symphonies ===
Harris composed at least 18 symphonies, though not all of them are numbered and not all are for orchestra. A full list is as follows:

- Symphony – Our Heritage (1925 rev. 1926, abandoned), sometimes referred to as Symphony No. 1 [for orchestra] – only an Andante survives
- Symphony – American Portrait (1928–29) [for orchestra]
- Symphony 1933 (1933), sometimes referred to as Symphony No. 1 [for orchestra]
- Symphony No. 2 (1934) [for orchestra]
- Symphony for Voices (1935) after Walt Whitman [for unaccompanied SATB chorus]
- Symphony No. 3 (1937–38, rev. 1939) [for orchestra]
- Folksong Symphony (Symphony No. 4) (1939 rev. 1942) [for chorus and orchestra]
- Symphony No. 5 (1940–42 rev. 1945) [for orchestra] — dedicated "to the heroic and freedom-loving people of our great ally, the Union of Soviet Republics"
- Symphony No. 6 'Gettysburg Address' after Lincoln (1943–44) [for orchestra]
- Symphony for Band 'West Point' (1952) [for US military band]
- Symphony No. 7 (1951–52, rev. 1955) [for orchestra]
- Symphony No. 8 'San Francisco' (1961–62) [for orchestra with concertante piano]
- Symphony No. 9 (1962) for Philadelphia [for orchestra]
- Symphony No. 10 'Abraham Lincoln' (1965) [for speaker, chorus, brass, 2 pianos and percussion]; revised version for speaker, chorus, piano and orchestra (1967; long thought missing, some string and woodwind parts found mis-filed in the library of the Youngstown Symphony, which premiered the orchestral version. Those parts donated to the Library of Congress.)
- Symphony No. 11 (1967) for New York PO 125th [for orchestra]
- Symphony No. 12 'Père Marquette' (1967–69) [for tenor solo, speaker and orchestra]
- Bicentennial Symphony 1776 (1969–74), numbered by Harris as Symphony No. 14 out of superstition over the number 13 but posthumously re-numbered as No. 13 by Dan Stehman with the permission of the composer's widow [for six-part chorus and orchestra with solo voices and speakers]

In addition there is a missing (and perhaps not completed) Symphony for High School Orchestra (1937) and the following unfinished or fragmentary works:

- American Symphony (1938) [for jazz band]
- Choral Symphony (1936) [for chorus and orchestra]
- Walt Whitman Symphony (1955–58) [baritone solo, chorus and orchestra]

In 2006 Naxos Records launched a project to record the 13 numbered symphonies, mainly with conductor Marin Alsop. As of June 2018, they had released recordings of the Third, Fourth, Fifth, Sixth, Seventh, and Ninth Symphonies. The recordings of the seventh and ninth symphonies are by the National Symphony Orchestra of Ukraine under Theodore Kuchar. Symphony 1933 was recorded in 1987 by the Louisville Orchestra under the baton of Jorge Mester for their First Edition Recordings series. The same orchestra has also recorded and released his Fifth Symphony 22 years prior. The Albany Symphony Orchestra, under the direction of David Alan Miller, released their recording of Harris's Symphony No. 2 (paired with Morton Gould's Third Symphony) in 2002. Harris's Eighth and Ninth Symphonies can be found on Albany Symphony Orchestra's 1999 recording titled, "The Great American Ninth".

=== Piano ===
- Sonata Op. 1 (1928) Prelude, Andante, Scherzo, Coda
- Little Suite for Piano (1938) Bells, Sad News, Children at Play, Slumber
- Suite for Piano (1944)
- American Ballads (1946)
- Two-Piano Concerto (1946)
- Toccata (1949), based on the withdrawn Toccata from 1939

=== Other notable works ===
- Andante for orchestra (1925 rev. 1926) [only completed movement of Symphony 'Our Heritage']
- Epilogue to Profiles in Courage – JFK (1964)
- Fantasy for piano and orchestra (1954)
- Concerto for String Quartet, Piano, and Clarinet (1926, rev. 1927-8)
- Piano Quintet (1936)
- String Quartet No. 3 (Four Preludes and Fugues) (1937)
- Violin Concerto (1949)
- When Johnny Comes Marching Home – An American Overture (1934)
- American Portraits for orchestra (1929)
- American Creed for orchestra (1940)
- What So Proudly We Hail – ballet (1942)
- Kentucky Spring for orchestra (1949)
- Cumberland Concerto for orchestra (1951)
- Abraham Lincoln Walks at Midnight – chamber cantata (1953) Based on a poem of the same title by Vachel Lindsay.
- Give Me the Splendid Silent Sun – cantata for baritone and orchestra (1959)
- Canticle to the Sun – cantata for soprano and chamber orchestra (1961)
- Western Landscape – ballet (1940)
- Evening Piece for orchestra (1940)
- Folk Fantasy for Festivals for piano and choir (1956)
