= George Lynn (composer) =

American composer and musician (1915–1989)

George Alfred Lynn (October 5, 1915 – March 16, 1989) was an American composer, conductor, pianist, organist, singer, and music educator who was born in Edwardsville, Pennsylvania and died in Colorado Springs, Colorado. A longtime member of the American Society of Composers, Authors and Publishers, his compositional output encompasses more than 200 orchestral and choral pieces; many of which have been performed by major American symphony orchestras like the Denver Symphony, the American Symphony Orchestra under Leopold Stokowski, and the Philadelphia Orchestra. He taught on the music faculties of several prominent American colleges, notably conducting several university choirs. Throughout his life he was active as a conductor, organist, and pianist for various church and community choirs.

== Life and career ==
Born in Wilkes-Barre, Pennsylvania, George Lynn was the son of immigrants from Sweden. He began working as a professional church organist in 1927 at the age of twelve. He entered Westminster Choir College in 1934 where he earned a Bachelor of Music in 1938. Among his teachers were Paul Boepple (conducting), Roy Harris (composition), Carl Weinrich (organ), and John Finley Williamson (conducting). He won second prize in the 1940 World's Fair for his composition "Hem and Haw - Seven Rounds and a Coda". He married soprano Betty Lynn prior to enlisting in the Army. They had a son, Eric, and Betty and Eric lived in Oklahoma while George Lynn was overseas. After serving in the United States Army during World War II, he entered the graduate music composition program at Princeton University where he was a pupil of Randall Thompson. He graduated from the school in 1947 with a Master of Fine Arts.

While studying at Princeton, Lynn returned to Westminster Choir College as a faculty member, teaching classes in organ and conducting. He left there in 1950 to join the music faculty at the University of Colorado at Boulder where he conducted several choirs for two years. At this time he divorced his first wife. He married Lucile Miller in 1952 and the couple had two daughters, Christina and Lorna. He then served as the organist/choirmaster at First Baptist Church, Saint Thomas Episcopal Church and First Plymouth Congregational Church in Denver and taught piano, organ, and singing out of a private studio. He returned to Westminster in 1963 when he was appointed the college's music director, a post he held through 1969.

In 1969 Lynn returned to Denver where he spent most of the rest of his life. From 1971 to 1986 he directed choirs and taught conducting at the Colorado School of Mines and at Loretto Heights College. He and his wife Lucile moved to Colorado Springs in 1977 and he became the minister of music at the Broadmoor Community Church and an active member of the musical scene in the city. He commuted and continued to teach at Loretto Heights and Colorado School of Mines. He served as a professor of choral music at Rice University in 1986–1987, after which he lived in retirement in Colorado. Among his notable students were conductors David Agler, Larry Biser, Eph Ehly, Gregory Gentry, Patricia Kazarow and Wayne Richmond and voice students [Gregory Stapp] and Bruce Brys. He died in Colorado Springs at the age of 73. His wife Lucile donated all of his manuscripts to the American Music Research Center. The archive was officially opened with a celebratory concert at the University of Colorado at Boulder on November 7, 1995. Christina Lynn-Craig continues to promote performances of her father's music. 2015 is the centenary of his birth. Celebrations of his teaching, conducting and compositions will be held at Westminster Choir College in May 2015 and at the University of Colorado in October 2015. There is a "100 Performance Centenary Challenge" which is meant to encourage musicians to include a piece of George Lynn's on a recital, or in a worship service or to build a concert around his music.
