= Helen Kemp =

American voice teacher, music pedagogue, composer and children's choir clinician

Helen Kemp (March 31, 1918 – August 23, 2015) was an American voice teacher, church music pedagogue, composer, and children's choir clinician.

Born Helen Hubbert in Perkasie, Pennsylvania, she attended the former Sell-Perk High School. She attended Westminster Choir College, where she met her future husband, John S.C. Kemp. The couple married in 1942, and later served on the Church Music faculty at Westminster. The Kemps moved to Oklahoma City in 1949 to work at the city's First Presbyterian Church. They were founding members of the Choristers Guild. In 1968, the couple returned to the faculty of Westminster Choir College. She wrote several books on children's choirs, including Of Primary Importance (1989). She was named Professor Emerita of Voice and Church Music at Westminster upon her retirement.

== Compositions ==
Kemp was a prolific choral composer, editor, and author of resources books for children's choirs. Among her many works published by Choristers Guild are:

- Of Primary Importance, Volume I
- Of Primary Importance, Volume II
- Follow the Star
- Canons, Songs, and Blessings
- A Song of Promise text by Helen Kemp
- Sing and Speak of God's Glory
- The Lord is Risen!

== Death ==
Kemp died in Jamison, Pennsylvania. The Kemps' marriage produced five children, daughters Julia, Peggy and Kathy, and sons John and Michael. The marriage lasted until John Kemp's death in 1997. Her 5 children survived her, as did 11 grandchildren and 18 great-grandchildren.

== Links ==
- Helen Kemp website
- Video interview, musicinnewjersey.com, May 6, 2015; accessed September 3, 2015.
- First Presbyterian Church, Oklahoma City, Oklahoma webpage (Kemp Concert Series page), fpcokc.org; accessed September 3, 2015.
- Mary Jane Voogt, Review of Of Primary Importance (September 1990), reformedworship.org; accessed September 3, 2015.
- Helen Kemp dead at 97 The Diapason, 2015
