= James Jordan (conductor) =

American conductor

James Jordan (born 1953) is an American writer, conductor, and professor at Westminster Choir College in Lawrenceville, New Jersey, where he is currently a Senior Conductor and directs the select recording ensemble Williamson Voices and the former director of the sophomore choir, Schola Cantorum, and the freshman choir, Chapel Choir. Jordan received a Bachelor of Music (B.M.) degree from Susquehanna University, and both a Master of Music (M.M.) degree in choral conducting and a Doctor of Philosophy (Ph.D.) in the psychology of music from Temple University and was a student of Elaine Brown, Wilhelm Ehmann and Frauke Haasemann. During the 2004–2005 academic year, he was a distinguished visiting professor of music education at West Chester University. He has also been a visiting professor, lecturer, and clinician at a number of conservatories and universities including the Curtis Institute.

Since the publishing of his book The Musicians Soul in 1999, Jordan has written over 60 books under the GIA Publications label. Jordan is the editor of the Evoking Sound Choral Series under the same label.

In 2013, the Williamson Voices under James Jordan, recorded and released a CD of James Whitbourn's Annelies, which was subsequently nominated for a Grammy Award for Best Choral Performance that year.

Jordan is recognized in the musical community as one of the United States' leading conductors, writers and innovators in the field of choral music. His contributions include work and research concerning the use of Laban Movement Analysis in the teaching of conducting and movement to children, and for advocating the use of the case study in research for training teachers.

Since the inauguration of the Williamson Voices at Westminster Choir College, the group has recorded 10 disks, a recent recording of composer Ola Gjeilo's Sunrise Mass (with string players from the Philadelphia Orchestra and the MET Philly Orchestra) and other works by the composer released in spring 2019. Another disk by the group, titled "Aurora," was released in summer 2020.

Jordan is currently working to help revise the Music Education curriculum in the Chinese public school system along with co-running, with James Whitbourn, the Choral Institute at Oxford, a yearly summer choral program for conductors to workshop and study with the two professors and the Williamson voices.

Jordan's current choral focus is the study of choral improvisation suggested by the work of conductor Gary Graden.

== Notable publications ==
- Evoking Sound: Fundamentals of Choral Conducting and Rehearsing. (Chicago: GIA Publications, 1996) (2nd Edition Available 2009)
- The Musician's Soul: A Journey Examining Spirituality for Performers, Teachers, Composers, Conductors, and Music Educators (Chicago: GIA Publications, 1999).
- The Musician's Spirit: Connecting to Others Through Story (Chicago: GIA Publications, 2002).
- The Choral Ensemble Warm-Up (Chicago: GIA Publications, 2005).
- The Musicians Walk (Chicago: GIA Publications, 2005).
