= Symphony No. 3 (Harris) =

1939 symphony by Roy Harris

Roy Harris's Symphony No. 3 is a symphony written in 1939. It received its world premiere on February 24, 1939, in Boston, with Serge Koussevitzky conducting the Boston Symphony Orchestra.

== History ==
Harris wrote this symphony on a commission from Hans Kindler but he gave it to Serge Koussevitzky instead. It has been described as "the quintessential American symphony", and "the most widely performed and recorded of all American symphonies".

The material that eventually became the opening of the Third Symphony was initially meant to be a violin concerto for Jascha Heifetz, but the commission fell through and Harris decided to turn it into a symphony. The point where the strings enter on middle C was to have been the solo violin's entrance.

The score was published by G. Schirmer in 1940.

== Analysis ==
The music is scored for 3 flutes (the third doubling on piccolo), 2 oboes, English horn, 2 soprano clarinets, bass clarinet, 2 bassoons, 4 horns, 3 trumpets, 3 trombones, 1 euphonium, 1 tuba, timpani, bass drum, cymbals, triangle, xylophone, vibraphone and strings.

According to Harris, the symphony is in five connected sections: Tragic, Lyrical, Pastoral, Fugue Dramatic, Dramatic Tragic. "After the first performance, Harris made two cuts" to the Pastoral section, specifically, measures 274–301 and 308–16. Originally the symphony did not end as in the published version, but stopped rather abruptly. At Koussevitzky's suggestion, Harris added a coda.

== Critical reception ==
In 1939, Koussevitzky conducted the Boston Symphony Orchestra in the premiere. While public reaction was initially chilly, the symphony has become more popular. This work uses a number of techniques that have become common in subsequent American classical music works, including "massive but spacious textures; a new emphasis on vital, syncopated rhythms... and a rich harmonic palette".

Koussevitzky made the world-premiere recording in a performance which Harris "regarded ... as the finest interpretation".

Together with "the Second Symphony by Howard Hanson, [and] the Third by Robert Ward ... the Third of Roy Harris" is one of those American symphonies which "are within the capabilities of our [American] community orchestras".
