= Rosephanye Powell =

American classical composer

- Born: Rosephanye Dunn; 1962 (age 63–64); Lanett, Alabama
- Education: Alabama State University; Westminster Choir College; The Florida State University
- Occupations: Composer, conductor, performer
- Spouse: William C. Powell
- Children: 2
- Website: www.rosephanyepowell.com

Dr Rosephanye Powell, (Note: pronounced ro-SEH-fuh-nee) (born 1962) is an American choral composer, singer, professor, conductor and researcher. Powell has been hailed as one of America's premier composers of choral music. She has a diverse catalogue of works published by Hal Leonard Corporation, the Fred Bock Music Company/Gentry Publications, Oxford University Press, and Alliance Music Publications. She serves as the Charles W Barkley Endowed Professor at Auburn University, Alabama.

== Personal life and education ==
Rosephanye Dunn Powell was born in Lanett, Alabama. She studied piano, played the saxophone, and sang in choirs as a child. Powell graduated from West Point High School (West Point, GA) in 1980 as valedictorian. She received a basketball scholarship to Alabama State University, but soon realized that she could not play basketball and pursue a music degree. Powell graduated summa cum laude from Alabama State University with a Bachelor of Music Education degree, vocal emphasis (1984); with distinction from Westminster Choir College with a master's degree in vocal performance and pedagogy (1987); and from The Florida State University as a University Fellow with a Doctor of Music degree in vocal performance(1993).

She is married to choral conductor and arranger William C. Powell. They have two daughters.

== Career ==
Prior to her career as a composer, Powell performed art song and lecture recitals dedicated to the works of William Grant Still and devoted herself to the interpretation of African-American spirituals. Powell served as editor and wrote the introduction for the anthology William Grant Still: An Art Song Collection. She had a weekly radio segment Living History on the nationally syndicated The Donnie McClurkin Show where Powell discussed Black music and history.

Powell taught at Philander Smith College from 1993 to 2001 and Georgia Southern University from 1987 to 1990. She is currently professor of voice at Auburn University.

In 2009, Powell was presented with the Living Legend Award at the California State University African Diaspora Sacred Music Festival in Los Angeles. She was listed in the first edition of the international publication Who Is Who in Choral Music (2007) and has been included in Who's Who Among America's Teachers and Outstanding Young Women in America.

In 2011, Powell and her husband served as editors of Spirituals for Upper Voices, a collection of twelve spirituals arranged for treble voices, published by Oxford University Press.

Powell has published articles in publications including Showchoir, Choral Journal and NATS Journal of Singing.

== Composition ==
Her compositions include sacred and secular works for mixed chorus, women's chorus, men's chorus, and children's voices. Her style of composition is characterized by heartfelt melodies, strong rhythmic emphasis, rich harmonies, often derived from African-American popular styles, and varied vocal textures, including counterpoint. Her influences include African-American musical styles; the choral works of J.S. Bach, G.F. Handel, Mozart and Verdi; the art songs of William Grant Still, Undine Smith Moore, Fernando Obradors, Samuel Barber, Emmanuel Chabrier; and the spiritual arrangements of H.T. Burleigh, J. Rosamond Johnson, William Dawson, Hall Johnson, Lena McLin, and Roland Carter.

In 2010, Powell's multi-movement work comprising six songs, Christmas Give, was a centerpiece for the CD "Christmas at America's First Cathedral", released by Gothic Records and featuring the Baltimore Choral Arts and orchestra at the Baltimore Basilica, directed by Tom Hall. Her first multi-movement sacred work for chorus, organ and orchestra, "The Cry of Jeremiah", commissioned by the American Guild of Organists, premiered in the Lincoln Center's Alice Tully Hall on May 10, 2014.

Powell's works are popular throughout the world, particularly in Europe and Asia and have been conducted by Philip Brunelle, Bob Chilcott, Rodney Eichenberger and André Thomas, amongst others.

== Works ==
Selected published works include:

- The word was God SATB a cappella (1996)
- I wanna be ready SATB, SSAA (1996/2004)
- Wait on the Lord SATB a cappella (1997)
- Ascribe to the Lord SATB, SSAA, TTBB (1998, 2001)
- Kingston Market 3-part Treble (1999)
- Wade in the water SATB a cappella (2000)
- Come let's celebrate SATB Christmas (2000)
- Grumble Too Much TTBB/SSAA (2000)
- Three psalms of David (2000)

1. O God, you are my God; 2. Make Haste, O God; 3.The Righteous Cry Out

- The promise lives on SATB (from Sing for the Cure) (2000)
- Drinkin' of the wine SATB a cappella (2002)
- Sorida SATB a cappella and African percussion (2002)
- Non nobis domine SATB, SSAA, TTBB (2002)
- GloriaSAB accompanied, (2002)
- I Dream A World SATB accompanied (2002)
- Sometimes I feel like a motherless child SATB a cappella (2003)
- Sing unto the Lord SATB a cappella (2003)
- Good news! SSAA a cappella (2003)
- Children of the rainbow, children's choir (2005)
- Pete, pete for treble voices and piano and African drums (2005)
- Sicut cervus for women's voices; composed for the 25th Anniversary of the Texas Collegiate Women's Choral Festival, (2004)
- Still I rise SSAA (2005)
- As the deer pants SSAA accompanied (2006)
- Ev'ry time I feel the spirit, SSAA, arranged for The Sofia Chamber Choir "Vassil Arnaudov"- Bulgaria, Southeastern Europe (2006)
- Gwendete two-part, African (2006)
- Come unto me all ye that labour (2006)
- Rejoice!, for chorus, organ, trumpets, and timpani (2007)
- He is marvelous SATB 2007
- Glory Hallelujah to duh newborn King SATB a cappella Christmas (2007)
- Solidaridad SATB accompanied, Spanish song (2008)
- Hope come true, a suite of songs for SSAA and SATB (2008) Each published separately and in different years.

1. In dat great giddin' up mo'nin (SATB a cappella); 2. Hope Come True (SSAA); 3. Keep Yo' Lamps (SSAA); 4. To Sit and Dream (text by Langston Hughes,

- Christmas give, suite of six songs for SATB chorus, soloist, and orchestra (2010) Each published separately and in different years.

1. Have you seen the baby Jesus (a cappella); 2. Christmas Memories; 3. Ring the Bells; 4. Holy Night; 5. Ogo ni fun Oluwa (African percussion); 6. Christus Natus Est (text by Harlem Renaissance poet Countee Cullen)

- Be glad in the Lord SATB a cappella (2009)
- Spirituals for upper voices (twelve songs for arranged for treble voices. editor, with William C. Powell), 2011
- Down by the riverside SSATB and piano (2011)
- The Cry of Jeremiah (four songs for SATB chorus, organ and orchestra with narration), 2012
  1. Is not his word like a fire
  2. O Lord, you have deceived me
  3. Cursed be the day
  4. Hallelujah!
- Phenomenally woven (2016)

=== Recordings ===
Her music has been recorded and issued on CD, including:

- Still I Rise (2006) (Vox Femina)
- Motherless Child (2009) Pub. Rosephanye Powell
- Christmas at America's First Cathedral (2010) (Baltimore Choral Arts and Orchestra)
- We Who Make Our Meaning Clear (2010) (MUSE: Cincinnati's Women's Choir)
- REFLECTIONS: Portraits from the Life of Christ (2010) (Oasis Chorale)
