= Dunja Vejzović =

Croatian opera singer (born 1943)

- Born: Dunja Crnković; 20 October 1943 (age 82); Zagreb, Independent State of Croatia
- Education: Zagreb Academy of Music
- Occupations: operatic mezzo-soprano soprano
- Years active: 1968 - 2014

Dunja Vejzović (pronounced [dûɲa v̞ɛ̂jzɔv̞it͡ɕ]; born 20 October 1943) is a Croatian operatic mezzo-soprano and soprano.

== Biography ==
Dunja Crnković was born in Zagreb and was married in 1963, changing her surname to Vejzović. She studied at the Zagreb Academy of Music, where she sang The Witch in Hänsel und Gretel in 1968. She began her career as a mezzo-soprano with the Croatian National Theatre in Zagreb, debuting in 1970 as Ariel in Stjepan Šulek's Oluja (The Tempest).

From 1971 to 1978, Vejzović was a member of the Nuremberg Opera, where she appeared in many operas, including principal roles in Orfeo ed Euridice, Carmen, Tannhäuser (as Venus), Intolleranza, Die Soldaten (as Charlotte), Dido and Æneas, Elektra (as Klytemnästra), Il trovatore (as Azucena, directed by Hans Neuenfels in his operatic debut), Boris Godunov (as Marina Mnichek), Wozzeck (as Marie), Aïda (as Amneris), Lulu (as the Countess Geschwitz), and Samson et Dalila. Among her teachers were Iris Adami Corradetti and Gina Cigna.

Her international career began in 1978, at the Bayreuth Festival, where she sang Kundry in Parsifal, for three summers. On 9 October 1978 Vejzović made her Metropolitan Opera debut in Tannhäuser, as Venus, opposite Jess Thomas in the name part, with James Levine conducting.

In 1980 and 1981, Herbert von Karajan engaged her to appear in his Salzburg Easter Festival Parsifal, which was reckoned a great success. In 1984, she sang Ortrud, in Lohengrin, for that Festival. In 1982, Vejzović debuted at the Teatro alla Scala, as Didon in Les Troyens, conducted by Georges Prêtre and directed by Luca Ronconi. At that theatre, she also appeared in Suor Angelica (as the Zia Principessa, 1983, conducted by Gianandrea Gavazzeni), Tannhäuser (1984), Der fliegende Holländer (as Senta, 1988), and Parsifal (conducted by Riccardo Muti, 1991).

Another of her great collaborations has been with the director Robert Wilson, in whose productions she sang the title role of Alceste (conducted by Christoph Eschenbach, 1986–87), and in Parsifal (1991 and 1992).

Vejzović has also appeared in Monte-Carlo (Brünnhilde in Die Walküre, 1979), Berlin, Carnegie Hall (the Verdi Requiem, conducted by Lorin Maazel, 1982), Barcelona (Hérodiade, opposite Montserrat Caballé and José Carreras, 1983), Paris (Médée, 1986), Teatro Colón (Kundry, 1986), Vienna (Wozzeck, under Claudio Abbado, 1987; Lohengrin, with Plácido Domingo, 1990), and Houston (Parsifal and Lohengrin, 1992).

Also in her repertoire are Erwartung, Rienzi, Siegfried, Le Cid, Bluebeard's Castle, Œdipus rex, Attila, Abigaille in Nabucco, I due Foscari, Princess Eboli in Don Carlos, Lady Macbeth in Macbeth, Fierrabras, Fidelio, Thérèse, Brangäne in Tristan und Isolde, and Sapho.

Other distinguished conductors with whom Vejzović has collaborated have included Christoph von Dohnányi, Armin Jordan, Michael Gielen, Lovro von Matačić, Jesús López-Cobos, Zubin Mehta, Carlos Kleiber, Nicola Rescigno, and Nikolaus Harnoncourt.

In 2002 she bid farewell to the stage, as Charlotte in Werther, at Zagreb, with Francisco Araiza in the name part.

She has twice won the Prix Fondation Fanny Heldy, for her recordings of Kundry and Ortrud. As of 2009, Mme Vejzović is a professor at the Hochschule für Musik, in Stuttgart.

In March 2014 Vejzović made a brief return to the stage, as the Grandmother Buryjovka, in Peter Konwitschny's production of Jenůfa, at Oper Graz.

== Abridged discography ==
- Schmidt: Fredigundis (Hollweg, Egel; Märzendorfer, 1979) [live] Orfeo
- Wagner: Parsifal (Hofmann; Karajan, 1979–80) Deutsche Grammophon
- Wagner: Lohengrin (Tomowa-Sintow, Kollo; Karajan, 1976–81) EMI
- Berg: "Three Fragments from Wozzeck" (C.Kleiber, 1982) [live] Exclusive
- Wagner: Der fliegende Holländer (Hofmann, van Dam; Karajan, 1981–83) EMI
- Mercadante: La vestale (Cécchele; Šutej, 1987) [live] Bongiovanni
- Berlioz: La mort de Cléopâtre (Eschenbach, 1988) Supraphon
- Krenek: Orpheus und Eurydice (Hamilton; Steinberg, 1990) [live] Orfeo
- Brahms: Alto Rhapsody (Eschenbach, 1992) Virgin Classics
- Pergolesi: Stabat mater (2005) Croatia Records

== Abridged videography ==
- Puccini: Suor Angelica (Plowright; Gavazzeni, Bussotti, 1983) [live] Kultur
- Wagner: Lohengrin (Studer, Domingo; Abbado, Weber, 1990) [live] Image Entertainment
