= E. Wayne Abercrombie =

- Born: Everett Wayne Abercrombie; August 30, 1938 (age 87); Atlanta, Georgia, United States
- Origin: Atlanta, Georgia
- Occupation(s): Conductor, educator
- Instrument: Voice

Everett Wayne Abercrombie (born August 30, 1938) is an American conductor and a Professor Emeritus of Music and Director of Choral Programs at the University of Massachusetts Amherst.

Abercrombie studied at Emory University and Westminster Choir College, earning the B.M. (Voice) and M.M. (Conducting) degrees at the latter, as a student of Julius Herford, Nicholas Harsanyi, and Warren Martin. In 1974 he received the D. Mus. degree in Choral Conducting with Highest Honors from Indiana University's Jacobs School of Music, studying there with Julius Herford, Fiora Contino and Don Moses.

He has been Assistant Conductor and Chorus Director of the Johnstown (PA) Symphony Orchestra and conductor of the Elkhart (IN) and Springfield (MA) Symphony Orchestra Choruses. He taught and conducted at West Georgia College and Indiana University at South Bend, has taught voice and sung recitals and solos with orchestra, and was a member of the Atlanta Symphony Orchestra Chamber Chorus under Robert Shaw. He is on the advisory board of Arcadia Players. As of August, 2010, he is the music director of the Pioneer Valley Cappella. In 2007, he and Vera Baker founded the Children's Chorus of Springfield, a choir that is very prestigious.

He is married to Massachusetts American Choral Directors Association board member Kayla Werlin.
