= Tom Findlay (cricketer) =

Scottish cricketer

Personal information
- Full name: Thomas Alexander Findlay
- Born: 22 March 1918; Rubislaw, Aberdeenshire, Scotland
- Died: 27 June 2005 (aged 87); Perth, Perthshire, Scotland
- Batting: Right-handed
- Relatives: Francis Findlay (brother)

Domestic team information
- Years: Team
- 1947: Scotland

Career statistics
Competition	First-class
Matches	1
Runs scored	19
Batting average	9.50
100s/50s	–/–
Top score	19
Catches/stumpings	1/–
- Source: Cricinfo, 3 November 2022

Thomas Alexander Findlay (22 March 1918 – 27 June 2005) was a Scottish first-class cricketer.

Findlay was born in March 1918 at Rubislaw, Aberdeenshire. He was educated at Robert Gordon's College. A club cricketer for Aberdeenshire, Findlay made a single appearance in first-class cricket for Scotland against Ireland at Cork in 1947. Batting twice in the match, he was dismissed without scoring by James Boucher in the Scotland first innings, while in their second innings he was dismissed for 19 runs by Sonny Hool. Outside of cricket, he was employed by the Clydesdale and North of Scotland Bank. Findlay died at Perth in June 2005. His brother, Francis, was also a first-class cricketer.
