= Annelies (Whitbourn) =

Annelies is a full-length choral work based on The Diary of Anne Frank. Annelies is the full first name of Anne Frank, now commonly referred to by her abbreviated forename, Anne. The music is by British composer James Whitbourn and the libretto is compiled from the diary by Melanie Challenger. The lyrics consist of translated passages from Frank's diary and interprets the different chapters of her hiding and eventual capture by the Nazi Regime.

== Structure ==
The composition is divide in fourteen movements:

1. Introit – prelude (instrumental)
2. The capture foretold
3. The plan to go into hiding
4. The last night at home and arrival at the Annexe
5. Life in hiding
6. Courage
7. Fear of capture and the second break-in
8. Sinfonia (Kyrie)
9. The Dream
10. Devastation of the outside world
11. Passing of time
12. The hope of liberation and a spring awakening
13. The capture and the concentration camp
14. Anne’s meditation

== Premieres ==
Movements from Annelies were first performed at the National UK Holocaust Memorial Day in Westminster Hall, London on 27 January 2005. The World Premiere of the full work followed in April 2005 at the Cadogan Hall, London, conducted by Leonard Slatkin with the Choir of Clare College Cambridge and the Royal Philharmonic Orchestra.

The US Premiere was presented in April 2007 at Westminster Choir College, Princeton NJ with Lynn Eustis (soprano) under James Jordan and the composer, with a reduced scoring for soprano, choir and chamber ensemble. The final chamber version calls for an ensemble comprising violin, cello, piano and clarinet and was premiered in The Netherlands on 12 June 2009 with Daniel Hope (violin) and Arianna Zukerman (soprano).

== Recording ==
In May, 2012, the piece was recorded for Naxos Records by the Westminster Williamson Voices under the direction of James Jordan with Soprano, Arianna Zukerman, the Lincoln Trio, and Clarinetist, Bharat Chandra. The recording was nominated for the 2014 Grammy for Best Choral Performance.

== Reprises ==
The group reunited for a performance of the piece in April 2019 at the Washington National Cathedral for the celebration of Anne Frank's 90th birthday.
