= Fiora Contino =

American opera conductor and teacher

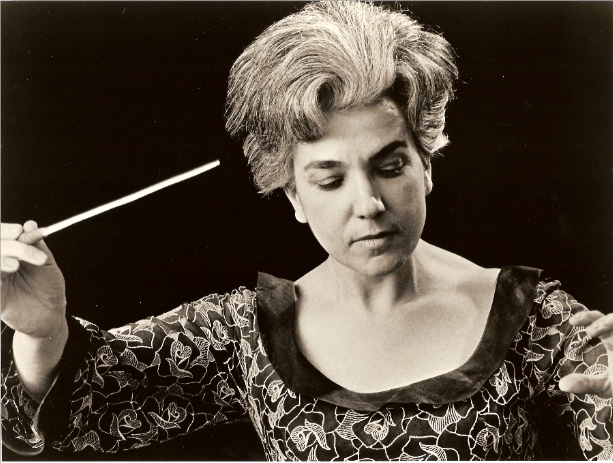
- Contino in 1979
- Born: Fiora d'Itala Rosa Corradetti; June 17, 1925; Lynbrook, New York, United States
- Died: March 5, 2017 (aged 91); Carmel, Indiana, United States
- Occupations: Conductor, educator

Fiora Corradetti Contino (June 17, 1925 – March 5, 2017) was an American opera conductor and teacher. She was particularly known for her interpretations of Italian verismo works of the late 19th century, and was described as one of the most important figures in opera of the 20th century. Anne Midgette of The New York Times once suggested that she "might have had a far bigger career had she been a man".

== Early life and education ==
Fiora d'Itala Rosa Corradetti was born in 1925 on Long Island in Lynbrook to Italian immigrant parents. Her mother was Anna Corradetti (née Lisarelli), a seamstress; her father, Ferruccio Corradetti, had been a noted baritone singer at La Scala and other European venues. Fiora Corradetti had no strong singing voice, and said later that she "had no voice but learned as a conductor to sing vicariously". She studied piano and later conducting. She had an older half sister, Iris, who was an opera singer and vocal coach.

At the age of 12, she was appointed as the church organist at the parish of St. Ignatius Martyr in Long Beach. Her father died when she was 14. Corradetti graduated from Long Beach High School and then studied piano performance at Oberlin College, Ohio, receiving a Bachelor of Music degree in piano in 1947. She married Joseph Contino, a fellow Oberlin graduate, changing her name.

From 1958, she studied conducting at the Conservatoire Americain in Fontainebleau, France, at the École Normale in Paris, and the Academy of Fine Arts Vienna in Austria. She studied with teachers such as Nadia Boulanger and Hans Swarowsky.

She received a masters and a doctorate degree in conducting from the Indiana University School of Music (now the Jacobs School of Music) in Bloomington in 1964. While at Jacobs, she made her conducting debut, presenting Monteverdi's L'incoronazione di Poppea.

== Conducting ==
In her late 20s, Contino founded the Amherst Community Opera in Massachusetts. She went on to serve as director of organizations including Opera Illinois in Peoria, Illinois, from 1986 to 2005, and the Aspen Choral Institute. She was a professor and choral department chair at Indiana University. In 1998 she made her New York conducting debut with Mascagni's Iris performed by the Teatro Grattacielo at Alice Tully Hall. Paul Griffiths wrote in The New York Times that her debut was a "luscious and exultant orchestral performance". She worked as a guest conductor with several notable opera companies, orchestras. and music festivals including the Aspen Music Festival, the Anchorage Opera, Chicago Opera Theater, the Pittsburgh Symphony, and the San Francisco Opera. She also conducted frequently at the Temple University Music Festival in Ambler, Pennsylvania.

A review of her performance of Puccini's Madama Butterfly in 1973, with Dorothy Kirsten, stated "[Contino] held everything together with a baton that was sharp and in clear control of a magnificently coordinated performance". Peter G. Davis wrote in 2001 of her performance of Alfano's Risurrezione, based on Leo Tolstoy's last novel, that she "may be the last conductor on earth with the music of Alfano and his generation in her bloodstream".

She considered Italian verismo opera to be her most favored music to conduct, stating in The New York Times in 2001 that it was "visceral", and she "just knew how to do it".

== Teaching ==
Contino held faculty positions at Bowling Green State University from 1963–1966, the Peabody Institute from 1978–1979, and the University of Texas at Austin. She ran a studio in New York City, where she trained opera singers and conductors. Among her students were Melinda O'Neal, Kenneth Kiesler, and E. Wayne Abercrombie.

== Personal life and death ==
Contino's marriage to Joseph Contino ended in divorce, yet she never changed her name. She had four children; three daughters: Lisa, Adriana, who was at one time principal cellist for the Stuttgart Chamber Orchestra, and Francesca), and one son (Frederic). At the time of her death she had nine grandchildren and 14 great-grandchildren. Her long-term companion, Jeraldine Baumgartner, died in 2012. Contino died aged 91 in Carmel, Indiana, of arteriosclerotic cardiovascular disease.
