= James Whitbourn =

British composer and conductor (1963–2024)

- Born: James Philip Edwin Whitbourn; 17 August 1963; Royal Tunbridge Wells, Kent, England
- Died: 12 March 2024 (aged 60); Kent, England
- Education: University of Oxford
- Occupations: Composer, conductor
- Website: jameswhitbourn.com

James Philip Edwin Whitbourn (17 August 1963 – 12 March 2024) was a British composer and conductor.

== Biography ==
James Whitbourn was born in Kent and educated at Skinners' School before winning a scholarship to Magdalen College, Oxford, where he gained his first two degrees. His international reputation as a composer developed from his early career as a programme maker at the BBC, during which he produced many award-winning programmes and developed a style known for its direct connection with audiences.

His close association with the BBC Philharmonic resulted in three large-scale commissions for voices and orchestra. His Son of God Mass has had many performances worldwide, especially in the US and Europe. In 2005, The Royal Philharmonic Orchestra with the Choir of Clare College Cambridge, under Leonard Slatkin, premiered his largest choral work Annelies, a setting of the Diary of Anne Frank, at London's Cadogan Hall to wide critical acclaim. The work was later re-scored in an alternative chamber version which was premiered in The Netherlands on what would have been Anne Frank's 80th birthday by the British violinist Daniel Hope and the American soprano Arianna Zukerman.

Whitbourn wrote a number of works for the late British tenor Robert Tear, with whom he also collaborated as librettist, including a festal setting of the Magnificat and Nunc Dimittis for King's College, Cambridge, a cantata for the St Endellion Festival and three Christmas carols. Other major works include the choral work Luminosity, scored for choir, viola, organ, tanpura and percussion and The Seven Heavens for choir and orchestra, which portrays the life of C. S. Lewis in the imagery of the medieval planets. The Seven Heavens was premiered at the Ulster Hall with the Belfast Philharmonic and the Ulster Orchestra.

From 2006 his compositions have been performed in several major concerts devoted to his music at Westminster Choir College in Princeton, New Jersey with whom he had a long-lasting association. In 2010 the Oxford-based chamber choir Commotio released a disc of his choral music on the Naxos label, Luminosity, which attracted much attention especially in the USA. In 2011, The Williamson Voices released the second Naxos choral disc, Living Voices with the saxophonist Jeremy Powell, and organist Ken Cowan under conductor James Jordan.

2013 saw the release on Naxos of Annelies, with Arianna Zukerman, The Lincoln Trio, Bharat Chandra and the Westminster Williamson Voices under James Jordan.

Television credits include music for the BBC's coverage of the Queen Mother's funeral, and major BBC series Son of God. Among many international awards and achievements, he earned three GRAMMY nominations (including Best Choral Performance for Annelies) and a Royal Television Society Award. He was Senior Research Fellow of St. Stephen's House, University of Oxford, and was a member of Oxford's Faculty of Music. In April 2020, he was appointed Director of Music at St Edmund Hall, Oxford, and in 2022, he was appointed Director of Music at Harris Manchester College, Oxford.

Whitbourn died from cancer on 12 March 2024, at the age of 60.

=== Career highlights ===
- 2000 – winner of Sandford St Martin Premier Award (with poet Michael Symmons Roberts) for Pika.
- 2001 – A Finer Truth – debut album of choral works sung by Clare College Choir Cambridge – released by Et'cetera.
- 2001 – orchestral score of multi award-winning BBC1 series Son of God.
- 2002 – Living Voices premiered in New York concert on the first anniversary of 9/11.
- 2004 – set prayer by Desmond Tutu for the Commonwealth Observance, Westminster Abbey.
- 2005 – movements from Annelies performed at the National Holocaust Commemoration, Palace of Westminster.
- 2005 – World premiere of Annelies given in London with the Royal Philharmonic Orchestra under Leonard Slatkin.
- 2007 – U. S. premiere of Annelies by Westminster Choir College's Williamson Voices under the direction of James Jordan.
- 2008 – Premiere of Luminosity in Philadelphia Cathedral, US with Daniel Stewart (viola), Westminster Williamson Voices and Schola Cantorum and Blair Academy Singers under James Jordan with Archedream Dance Theater.
- 2009 – The Netherlands premiere of Annelies in The Hague on the 80th anniversary of Anne Frank's birthday, with Daniel Hope (violin) and Arianna Zukerman (soprano).
- 2010 – release of Naxos disc Luminosity.
- 2011 – release of Naxos disc Living Voices.
- 2012 – two GRAMMY nominations (Best Opera Recording).
- 2013 – release of Naxos disc Annelies. (GRAMMY nomination for Best Choral Performance, 2014)
- 2015 – World premiere of The Seven Heavens, the life of C. S. Lewis in the imagery of the medieval planets, at the Ulster Hall, Belfast with the Belfast Philharmonic and the Ulster Orchestra.
- 2016 – release of Naxos disc Carolae.
- 2019 – signed as house composer to Oxford University Press

== Selected works ==
- Pika for tenor, speaker and orchestra (2000)
- Son of God Mass for mixed chorus, soprano saxophone and organ (2000)
- The Wounds, Passiontide Sequence for mixed chorus, speaker, violin, cello and organ (2000, 2007); words from the Bible and by Michael Symmons Roberts
- Whirlwind, Cantata for tenor, speaker, gospel choir, orchestra (2002); words by Michael Symmons Roberts
- Annelies for soprano, choir, orchestra (2004); or for soprano, choir, violin, cello, piano and clarinet (2009); text from The Diary of Anne Frank
- Missa Carolae, Christmas Mass for mixed chorus, organ, piccolo, brass ensemble and percussion (2004)
- Luminosity, Cantata-Meditation for double mixed chorus, viola, tanpura, tam-tam and organ (2007)
- The Canticles of Mary and Simeon: Magnificat and Nunc Dimittis (Eboracum) for mixed chorus, viola and organ (2011)
- Requiem Canticorum, Requiem of Canticles for mixed chorus, soprano saxophone and organ (2011)
- The Seven Heavens, the life of C. S. Lewis in the medieval planets for mixed chorus and symphony orchestra (2015)
