= Tito Schipa Jr. =

Italian singer-songwriter

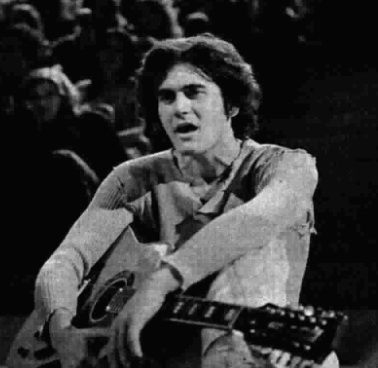
- Tito Schipa Jr., 1972.
- Born: 18 April 1946 (age 80); Lisbon, Portugal
- Occupations: Composer; singer-songwriter; producer; writer; actor
- Father: Tito Schipa

Tito Luigi Giovanni Michelangelo Schipa (born 18 April 1946), better known as Tito Schipa Jr., is a Portuguese-born Italian composer, singer-songwriter, producer, writer and actor.

== Career ==
Born in Lisbon, Schipa is the son of the Italian tenor Tito Schipa. He studied singing and piano and made his professional debut in 1967 with a musical based on songs by Bob Dylan, Then an Alley.

In 1970 he composed and directed Orfeo 9, which is considered the first Italian rock opera. It was adapted into a film directed by the same Schipa in 1973, while a double album based on the opera was released in 1972. In 1975 he founded the Teatro in Trastevere. In 1980 he released Er Dompasquale, the first triple album ever produced in Italy, which was a rock adaptation of Gaetano Donizetti's opera Don Pasquale.

In 1988 Schipa released Dylaniato, an album of Bob Dylan's cover songs adapted in Italian and Romanesco dialect. Between 1989 and 1990 he published for the editor Arcana the translations of Jim Morrison's poetries and of Bob Dylan's complete works. Schipa's varied career include credits as actor, radio and television writer and stage director.

== Discography ==
Albums

- 1972 – Orfeo 9 (Fonit Cetra, LPX 16/17)
- 1974 – Io ed io solo (Fonit Cetra, LPX 31)
- 1980 – Er Dompasquale (RCA Italiana, PL 31445)
- 1983 – Concerto per un primo amore (Gattocicova, LP 33604)
- 1988 – Dylaniato (IT, ZL 71804)
