= Iris Adami Corradetti =

Italian opera singer (1904–1998)

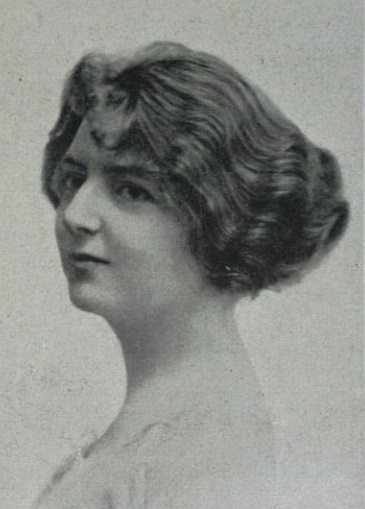
Iris Adami Corradetti

Iris Adami Corradetti (19 March 1904 – 26 June 1998) was an Italian opera soprano, and latterly a singing teacher.

== Biography ==
Iris Adami Corradetti in Madama Butterfly, Teatro alla Scala, Milan, 1944 (photo with dedication).

Adami Corradetti was born in Milan in 1904. Her father, Ferruccio Corradetti, was a noted baritone singer at La Scala and other European venues, and a music critic. Her mother was Bice Adami, a soprano singer. Her younger half-sister, Fiora Contino, became a conductor and music teacher.

A soprano singer, Corradetti studied piano and taught herself singing. She debuted in 1926 at the Teatro Dal Verme in Milan, playing the part of Coralità in the opera Anima allegra by Franco Vittadini. In 1928, she was the protagonist at La Scala in Milan, playing Rosalina in Sly by Ermanno Wolf-Ferrari. In the same season, she sang her first Mozart part, that of Barbarina in The Marriage of Figaro.

Corradetti had a vast repertoire that included eighty works, of which thirty-five were first performances of a piece, and about a hundred roles, mostly by composers of early Romanticism, such as Mozart and Cimarosa, as well as Verdi, Puccini, and Mascagni. She also performed works by contemporary composers such as Alberto Franchetti, Giuseppe Mulè and Ermanno Wolf-Ferrari. The parts that were most noted in her career were those of Francesca, in Francesca da Rimini by Riccardo Zandonai and the Madama Butterfly by Puccini.

In the 1930s, she recorded some works for Italian radio. Corradetti officially retired from performing on 28 January 1946, during a Martini & Rossi concert; although on 18 March 1957 invited to a concert, she gave a final farewell to her career. After her retirement, Corradetti dedicated herself to teaching singing, initially in the Conservatorio di Musica Benedetto Marcello di Venezia in Venice, and latterly in Padua. Among her most famous students were Katia Ricciarelli, Mara Zampieri, Lucia Valentini Terrani, Dunja Vejzovic, and Wladimiro Ganzarolli. She participated as a judge on the panels of many singing competitions, held conferences and master classes, in Italy and abroad, and for her expertise was assigned artistic direction positions at various institutions.

There are few recordings of her voice; three opera pieces were recorded in 1940 for Cetra Records and a series of concert arias, made from live recordings and today remastered on CD.

== Discography ==
- Giacomo Puccini, Madama Butterfly: "Un bel dì vedremo"
- Pietro Mascagni, Lodoletta: "Flammen perdonami"
- Riccardo Zandonai, Francesca da Rimini: "Paolo, datemi pace"
- Franco Alfano: "Ninna nanna partenopea"
- Gabriel Fauré: "Les berceaux" – "Notre amour" – "Automne"
- Riccardo Zandonai: "Lontana"
- Giorgio Federico Ghedini: "Dì, Maria dolce"
- Maurice Ravel: "Cinq melodies populaires grecques"
- Manuel de Falla: "Asturiana" – "Nana" – "Jota" (from Siete canciones populares españolas)
- Goffredo Petrassi: "Benedizione"
- Edvard Grieg: "Ein Swan"
- Igor Stravinsky: "Pastorale"
