= Westminster Choir College =

Music conservatory at Rider University

Coordinates: 40.35624°N 74.65291°W

- Motto: Latin: Spectemur agendo
- Motto in English: Let us be judged by our deeds
- Type: Private
- Established: 1926; 100 years ago
- Endowment: US$20 million
- President: John Loyack
- Dean: Jason Vodicka
- Faculty: 25
- Undergraduates: 85
- Postgraduates: 115
- Location: Dayton, OH (1926–1929), Ithaca, NY (1929–1932), Princeton, NJ (1932–2020), Lawrenceville, NJ (2020– ), United States
- Colors: Purple and gold
- Mascot: None
- Website: www.rider.edu/wcc

Westminster Choir College (WCC) is a historic conservatory of music, currently operating on the campus of Rider University, in Lawrenceville, New Jersey. Westminster Choir College is now a school of Rider's newly founded "Wesminster College of Media and Performing Arts," an umbrella for all of the University's arts programs.

From 1926 to 1929, WCC was an independent school located in Dayton, Ohio; it was then moved to Ithaca, New York (1929–1932), before relocating to Princeton, New Jersey (1932–2020), for much of its operating history. In 1992, the college merged with Rider University, continuing to occupy the historic campus in Downtown Princeton. In 2019, Rider University (controversially) attempted to monetize and sell the school, an issue under ongoing litigation by numerous plaintiffs. After a failed sale to Beijing-based Kaiwen Education Technology (formerly Jiansu Zhongtai Steel Structure Company), a for-profit enterprise with numerous financial burdens of its own—and owned solely by the Chinese government—Rider abandoned the Princeton campus and moved Westminster's programs to the University's main campus in Lawrenceville. In September 2024, the Princeton municipal council moved to purchase the campus through eminent domain for $50 million.

== History ==
=== 1920–1932: Presbyterian beginnings to the creation of a college ===
In 1920 John Finley Williamson founded the Westminster Choir at the Westminster Presbyterian Church of Dayton, Ohio. In 1926, he established the Westminster Choir School. The school started with a faculty of ten, and sixty students. The graduates came to be known as Ministers of Music, a term coined by Williamson and still used today by many church music programs. The sound of the choir in its early days was heavily influenced by the work of F. Melius Christiansen and The St. Olaf Choir, however the choir quickly developed its own sound that more closely resembled English choirs.

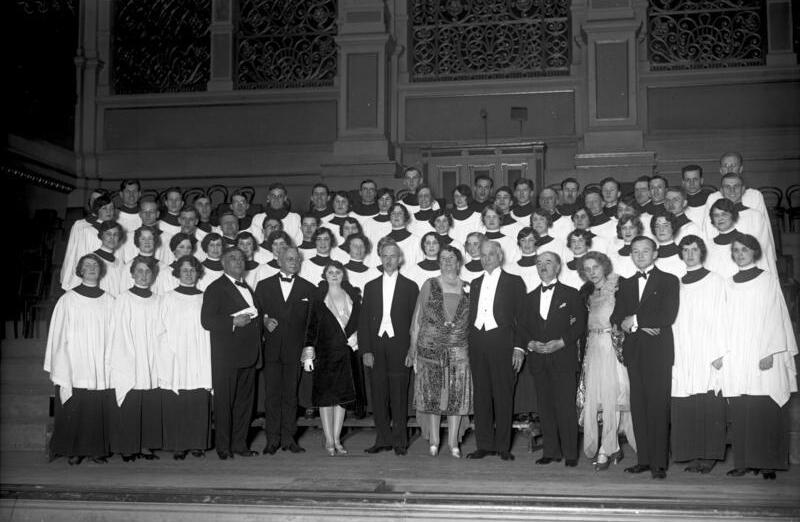
Dayton Westminster Choir at Berliner Philharmonie in 1929

In 1922, the choir, then known as the Dayton Westminster Choir, began touring the United States annually, singing in Carnegie Hall (New York City), nearby Cincinnati Music Hall (Cincinnati), Symphony Hall (Boston), the Academy of Music (Philadelphia), Orchestra Hall (Chicago) and the White House for President Calvin Coolidge. The Choir made its first commercial recording with RCA Victor in 1926; recordings with other major conductors and orchestras followed.

In 1928, the Choir and the Cincinnati Symphony Orchestra conducted by Leopold Stokowski made the nation's first coast-to-coast broadcast on Cincinnati radio station WLW. By a few years later, the Choir made a total of 60 half-hour broadcasts from NBC's New York facilities.

On March 9, 1929, the Choir performed at the White House for newly inaugurated President Herbert Hoover. Years later, the Choir also sang for Presidents Franklin D. Roosevelt, Dwight D. Eisenhower, and Lyndon B. Johnson.

The first European tour took place in 1929 and was sponsored by Dayton philanthropist Katharine Houk Talbott and endorsed by Walter Damrosch, conductor of the New York Symphony Orchestra. The tour included 26 concerts in major cities of Europe.

Originally a three-year program, the Choir School moved to Ithaca College in New York State in 1929 and enlarged its curriculum to a four-year program culminating in a Bachelor of Music degree. A major reason for the move involved the need to be able to reach the major cities of Chicago, Philadelphia, and New York by rail. All three were cities that sought the choir under Williamson.

=== 1932–1991: Independent music school in Princeton ===
In 1932, the choir school relocated to Princeton, New Jersey, which became its long-term home. Classes were held in the First Presbyterian Church and the Princeton Seminary until 1934, when the school moved to its own campus. This was made possible by a large gift from the Ohio philanthropist Sophia Strong Taylor. The dedication of the new campus was marked by a performance of Johann Sebastian Bach's Mass in B minor at the Princeton University Chapel with the Westminster Choir, soloists, and the Philadelphia Orchestra (conducted by Leopold Stokowski). The services of the soloists, orchestra, and conductor were a gift from Stokowski.

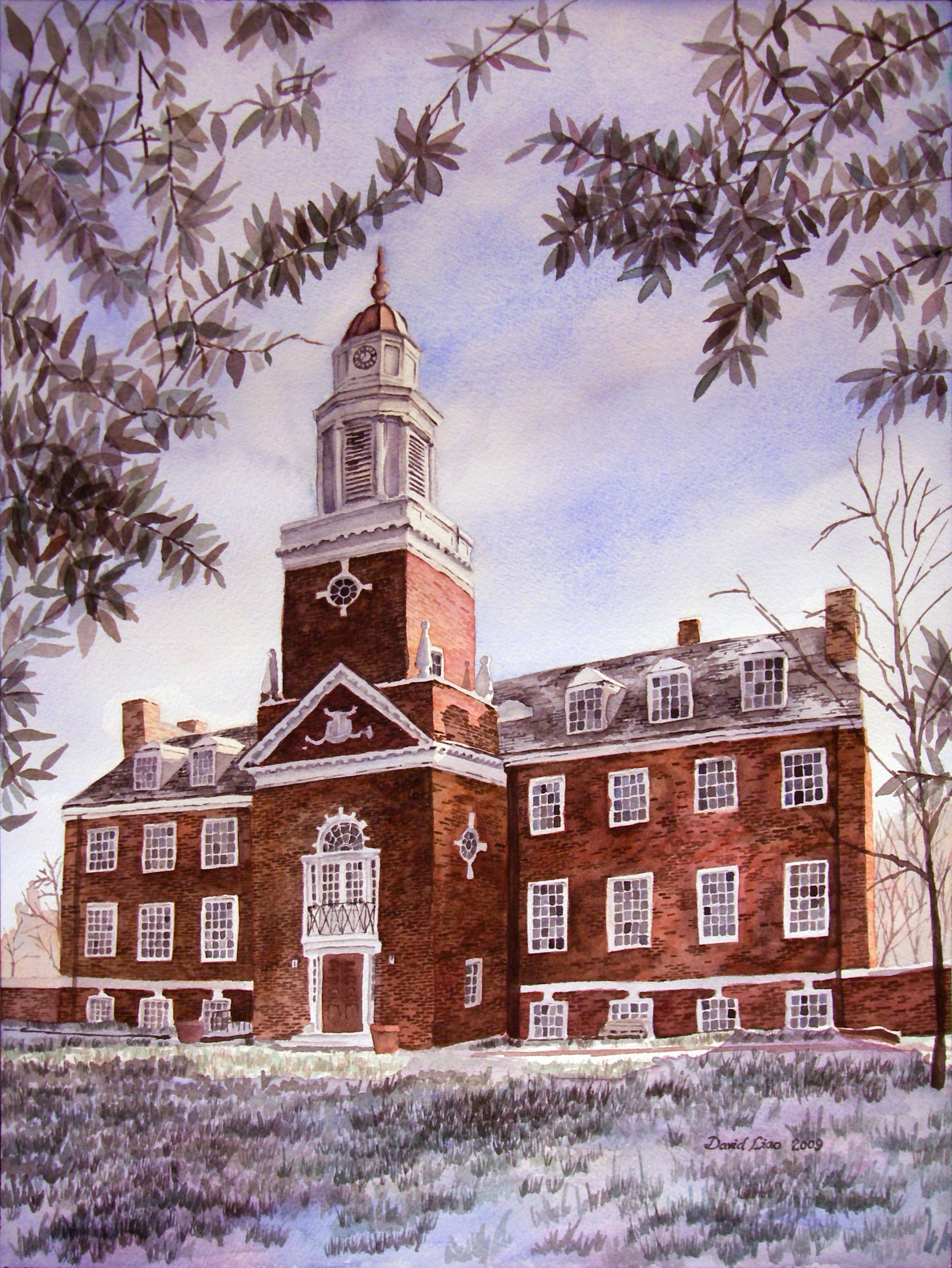
Williamson Hall, Westminster Choir College

In 1934, a second European choir tour took place, lasting for nine weeks and highlighted by a live radio broadcast from Russia to the United States. In the fourteen years since its founding, in 1920, the choir already had undertaken two European tours, earning international acclaim and a campus of its own. In 1939, the State of New Jersey granted the choir school accreditation, and the name Westminster Choir College was adopted. In the years following accreditation, under Williamson's leadership, the choir would begin having regular concerts with the New York Philharmonic and the Philadelphia Orchestra. Also in 1939, the Westminster Choir sang with the New York Philharmonic for the first time, conducted by Sir John Barbirolli.

Since the 1930s, the choir has performed over three hundred concerts with the Philharmonic, a record number for a single choir to perform with an orchestra. Late in 1939, the choir sang with the NBC Symphony Orchestra, conducted by Arturo Toscanini. That same year, the choir, directed by Williamson, sang at the dedication of the New York World's Fair, which was broadcast to 53 countries.

In 1957, under the auspices of the U.S. State Department Cultural Exchange Program, the choir undertook a five-month world tour, concertizing in 22 countries and covering 40,000 miles (64,000 km), appearing before approximately a quarter-million people.

In 1958, Williamson retired as President of Westminster Choir College. On July 3, 1964, shortly after his death, and in accordance with his requests, his ashes were scattered on his beloved campus. This was said to have taken place during the performance of the Verdi Requiem with the Westminster Festival Choir, soloists, and the Festival Orchestra conducted by maestro Eugene Ormandy. This performance on the Westminster campus was part of the Tercentennial Celebration of the State of New Jersey. The following day, a memorial service for Williamson was held in the College Chapel.

In 1976, the choir college celebrated its 50th anniversary, highlighted by a performance of Ludwig van Beethoven's Symphony No. 9 with the Atlanta Symphony Orchestra (conducted by Robert Shaw), alumni soloists, and the Westminster Alumni Choir on the Princeton University campus. Despite a promising future at the 50th anniversary, Westminster soon began to see its prospects for continued existence threatened. Facilities on the campus fell into disrepair, and Erdman Hall was ultimately condemned as unfit for use. Recognizing that the college could not continue in this path, Westminster was faced with two options—either find a larger university to merge with, or cease operations.

=== 1991–2017: Merger with Rider University and maintenance of dual campuses ===
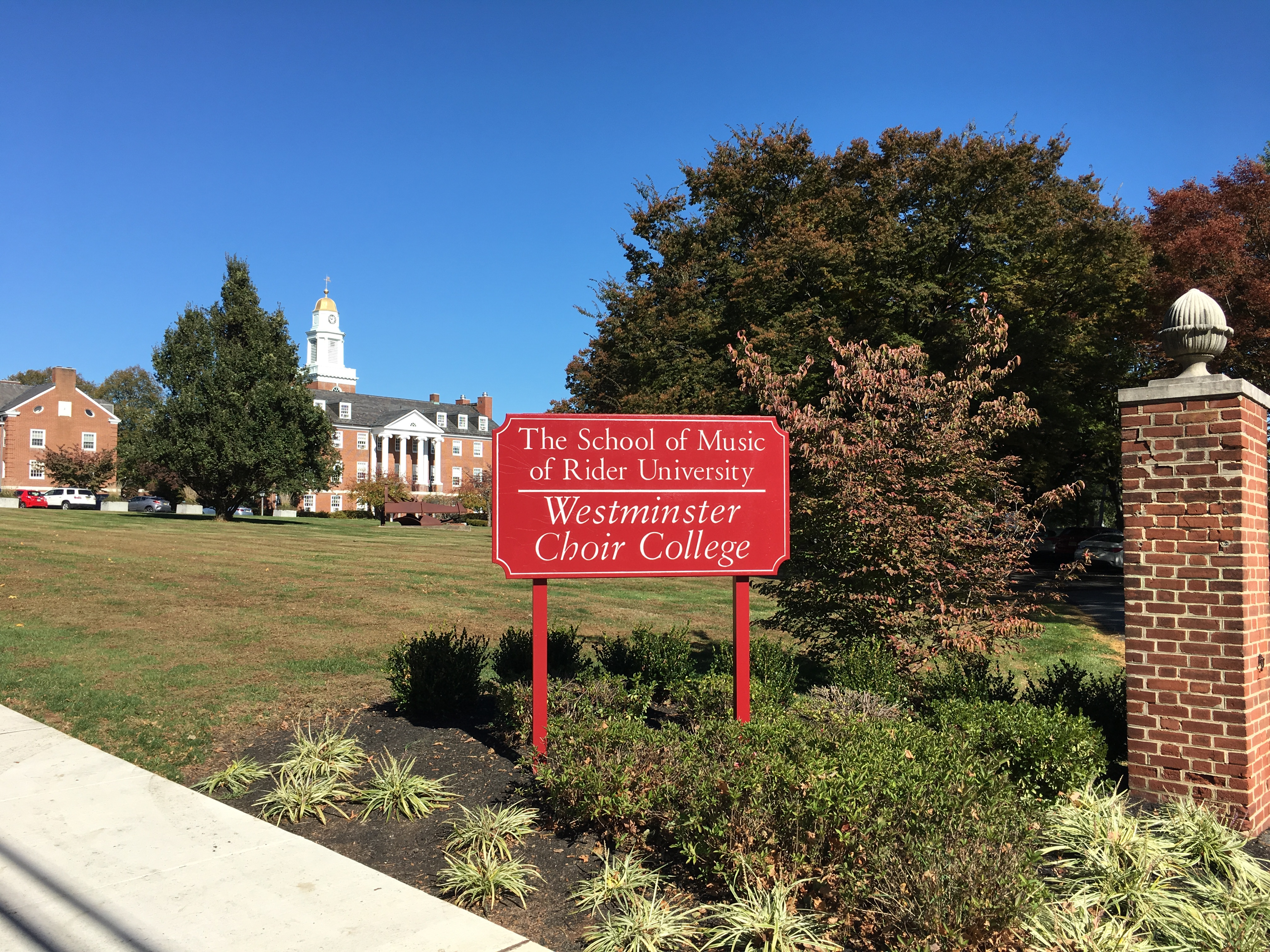
Entrance sign for the college as seen in 2019, which speaks to its relationship with its parent

Several schools, including nearby Princeton University as well as Drew University, Yale University, The Curtis Institute of Music, and The Juilliard School, all had an interest in purchasing Westminster Choir College. The desire of Westminster to remain in its historic campus resulted in an arrangement with the nearby Rider College. In 1992, following a year of affiliation, Rider College merged with Westminster Choir College and the music school became a part of the newly created Rider University. Despite promises that Rider would maintain the Westminster Choir College campus in Princeton, two years later, Rider President J. Barton Luedeke began exploring a move that would relocate WCC to Lawrenceville, New Jersey, to be with the rest of Rider University. By 1996, the choir college appeared to have a vibrant fiscal future in Princeton, operating in the black, thanks to increased enrollment and donations. One year later Erdman Hall was renovated, restored, and reopened as the Presser Music Center at Erdman Hall, featuring teaching studios, a keyboard laboratory, voice library and resource center, and new classroom space.

Despite the optimistic future in the 1990s, by the early 2000s Rider University determined Westminster Choir College either must create an even stronger fiscal future or face closure. Looking for a way to control costs and more effectively create synergies between the two campuses of Rider University (Westminster's and the main campus), in November 2007, Rider University President Mordechai Rozanski announced the creation of the Westminster College of the Arts. Westminster College of the Arts was envisioned to integrate Rider and Westminster more successfully, and create a new culture and environment of artistic excellence on both campuses. Westminster Choir College continued to educate Westminster College of the Arts students in the fields of piano, composition, voice, organ, choral conducting, sacred music, and music education. The newly formed School of Fine and Performing Arts served as the gateway to receiving a degree in musical theatre, arts administration, and music, as well as a non-professional degree (B.A. in Fine Arts) in music, dance, and theater. The creation of Westminster College of the Arts sparked heated debate among administrators, students, alumni and faculty that highlighted the divide between Rider's Princeton and Lawrenceville campuses.

Westminster formed the Princeton University Program with nearby Princeton University. By reciprocal arrangement, Westminster students, except freshmen, may petition to take courses at Princeton. Generally, no cost is involved beyond tuition charges at Westminster. Students are limited to one course per term, to fall or spring enrollment and to courses not offered by Westminster. The program is limited to 10 students per semester, selection and approval being made by academic deans at both institutions. In return, ten select students of Princeton University study and take courses at Westminster each semester.

In 2005, Westminster unveiled an ambitious master plan calling for upgrades including a new building, the first to be created on the campus under Rider University's stewardship. The choir college also entered a cooperative agreement with the Princeton Regional Schools, allowing for up to 40 Westminster performances per year in their newly created Regional Performing Arts Center (located in Princeton High School across the street), alleviating Westminster's struggle from having no dedicated, large performance space on the campus.

The lack of a large concert venue was solved in 2013 when the State of New Jersey allotted $4.6 million to Rider University to be spent on new academic facilities for Westminster's campus. Combined with donations from alumni and other supporters of the conservatory, the funds spent on this project far exceeded $5 million. Opened in 2014, the complex is named the Marion Buckelew Cullen Center in honor of the philanthropist who died in 2012 and made a $5 million bequest to Westminster Choir College. The new building contains a 3,000-square-foot performance and rehearsal hall named the Hillman Performance Hall, in recognition of the Henry L. Hillman Foundation, which provided a $3 million grant to support the project. In addition to the performance/rehearsal hall, the Cullen Center includes a large lobby, a green room, and three flexibly configured classrooms that accommodate a wide range of academic and choral uses. The Cullen Center also includes an integrated connection to The Playhouse that provides improved audience access and amenities. To maximize the opportunities the project offers for enhancing The Playhouse itself, the college secured $1.5 million to upgrade this building that has played such an important role in Westminster's history. Ground was broken for the project in the summer of 2013 and the Cullen Center was completed by spring 2015. Currently, as a result of the college's move to Lawrenceville, the Cullen Center sits abandoned with no plans for future use.

=== 2017–present: Move to Lawrenceville ===
On March 28, 2017, after months of speculation following an announcement by Rider that it was again considering moving the Westminster students to the Lawrenceville campus and selling the Princeton campus due to purported financial problems, it was decided by the Board of Trustees that Rider would, instead, attempt to sell WCC to a new affiliate partner. A timeline of 12 months was established with hopes that a buyer would be found in the upcoming year.

On February 26, 2018, Rider announced its intention to sell Westminster to Kaiwen Education Technology (formerly Jiansu Zhongtai Steel Structure Company), a for-profit enterprise owned solely by the Chinese government. This created widespread speculation that it was President Gregory G. Dell'Omo's intention to scuttle the college. This was also reported in a March 2018 Bloomberg Business News article which said that Beijing Kaiwen Education Technology Company had agreed to pay $40 million for the college. The sale subsequently faced opposition from state politicians on grounds of national security, and lawsuits from Westminster alumni and donors and the Princeton Theological Seminary alleging, among other things, violation of IRS regulations and of previous agreements governing the Princeton campus.

On July 1, 2019, it was announced that Beijing Kaiwen was withdrawing from the proposed purchase. This was followed by news that Rider would relocate Westminster's programs to the Lawrenceville campus in September 2020. At Rider University's convocation exercises on August 29, 2019, Dell'Omo announced that the relocation of Westminster and the sale of a large portion of Westminster's Princeton campus would directly benefit Rider University's ongoing campus investments.

Westminster Choir College officially relocated to Rider's Lawrenceville campus in fall 2020, operating under remote instruction because of the COVID-19 pandemic. In 2022, the Westminster College of the Arts merged with the Rider University College of Liberal Arts and Sciences to create the College of Arts and Sciences of which Westminster Choir College is now a school. Enrollment in on-ground programs, which had plummeted due to the move and the COVID-19 pandemic, began to regrow in Fall 2024 (online enrollments in Westminster's master's programs has remained strong), and students' complaints as to the suitability of Rider's facilities have been addressed through continued projects like new flooring and acoustical treatment for Gill Chapel, the renovation of the SRC Seminar Room as a rehearsal space for opera, and the creation of a music computer lab in the Fine Arts Building.

In 2023, Rider University discontinued Westminster Choir College’s separate commencement ceremony; however, the event has continued under the designation of a “Chapel Service.” That same year, Rider also ceased issuing diplomas bearing the Westminster Choir College name, despite earlier assurances that the name would continue to appear on graduates’ diplomas. As of 2026, Rider University has begun reissuing diplomas for graduates from that period to once again reflect the Westminster Choir College name.

In January 2025, four-time Grammy-winning alumnus Donald Nally was named Westminster's Director of Choral Studies. In that capacity he conducts Westminster Choir and Westminster Symphonic Choir and leads the graduate conducting program.

In April 2025, the town of Princeton purchased the vacant Westminster campus for $42 million. Rider received approximately $13 million from the transaction, while Princeton Theological Seminary, as successor trustee under the trust governing the property, received the remaining 70 percent of the sale proceeds. The division of the proceeds followed litigation over the terms of the trust after Rider relocated Westminster Choir College from Princeton in 2020. Provoking controversy has what to do with the property and the financial cost to maintain it .

In December 2025, Westminster Choir College administrators circulated a message to alumni reaffirming the institution’s commitment to Westminster’s traditions and identity under Rider University’s new leadership. The communication announced that diplomas would once again bear the name “Westminster Choir College,” and that graduates from 2022 to 2025 would be eligible to receive reprinted diplomas reflecting that name. The message also noted that Westminster Conservatory had been placed under the leadership of Westminster’s Senior Associate Dean, that Westminster merchandise bearing the lyre logo had become available through the university bookstore, and that the former Princeton campus would be used for alumni events and student performances with the cooperation of the Municipality of Princeton. Additionally, the email outlined renewed recruitment efforts, continued observance of long-standing traditions such as Readings and Carols and Alumni Week, and the restoration of academic regalia and the Westminster gonfalon at the Westminster Chapel Service. University President John Loyack was quoted as expressing a commitment to reimagining Westminster’s future and engaging alumni in a task force intended to chart the college’s long-term direction.

As of 2026, a small number of concerts, events, and rehearsals took place once again on the Princeton campus, until many of the buildings were found to be unusable in their current state. In May of that year, the school celebrated the 100th anniversary during the Final Chapel Service. Over 500 singers were in attendance between faculty, staff, and alumni, along side a 44-piece orchestra and organ. Rider President John Loyack gave an address where he expressed his support and hope for the future of Westminster Choir College, and announced the creation of the Westminster College of Media and Performing Arts, under which Westminster Choir College would retain its historic name and identity while expanding interdisciplinary opportunities. Opportunities are being explored to support Westminster's growth while retaining its history of "service through music."

== Grammy Awards ==
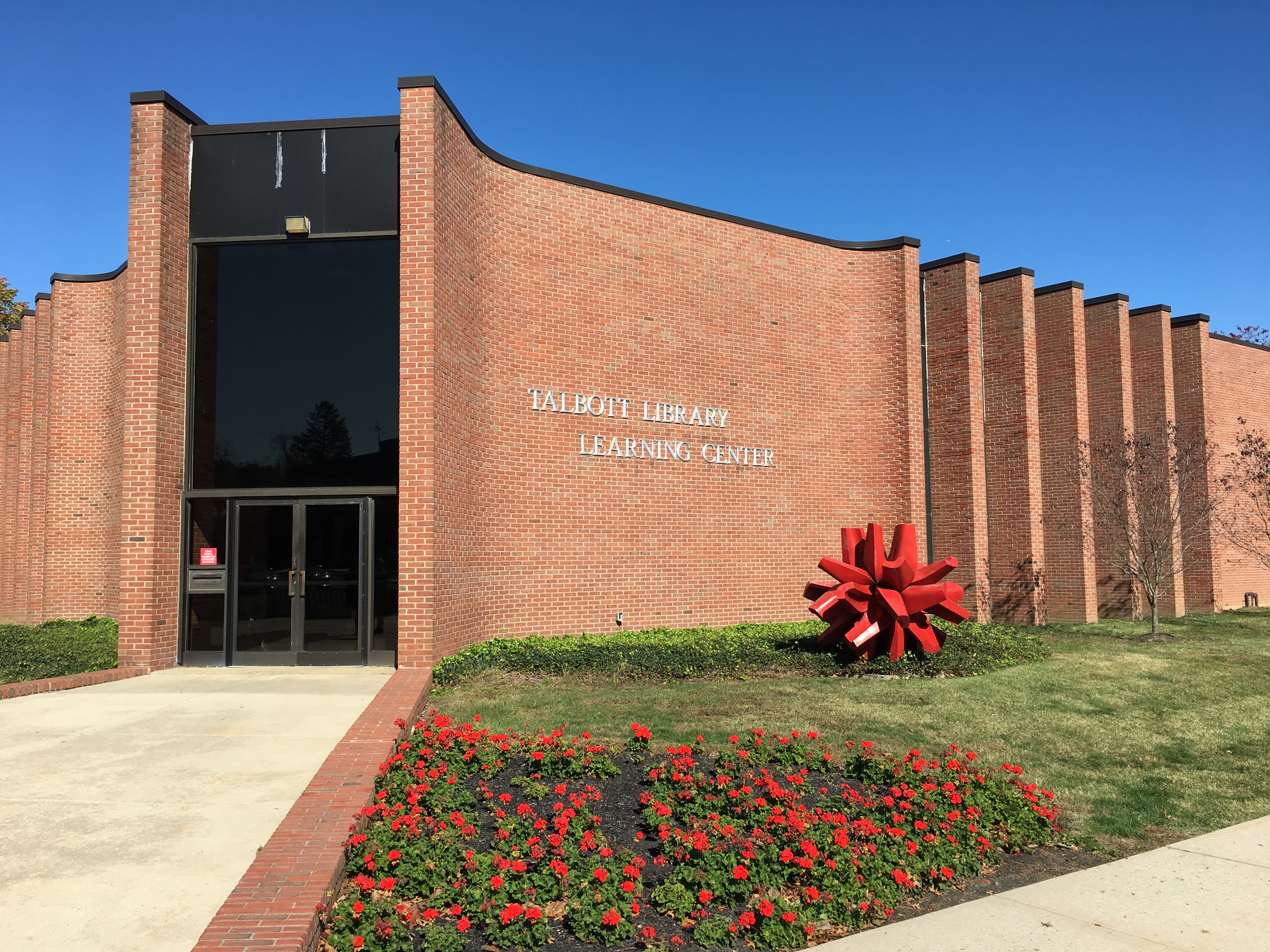
Talbott Library Learning Center

- James Whitbourn: Annelies, 2014

Westminster Williamson Voices,
James Jordan, Ariana Zukerman, and The Lincoln Trio with Bharat Chandra
Naxos Records (Nominated)

- Dvořák: Requiem; Symphony No.9 From the New World, 2000

The Westminster Symphonic Choir
Zdeněk Mácal and the New Jersey Symphony Orchestra
Delos Records

- Berlioz: Romeo & Juliet, 1986

The Westminster Symphonic Choir
Riccardo Muti and the Philadelphia Orchestra
Angel/EMI (Nominated)

- Barber: Antony & Cleopatra, 1983

The Westminster Symphonic Choir
C. Badea and the Spoleto Festival Orchestra
New World Records

- Haydn: Lord Nelson Mass, 1977

The Westminster Symphonic Choir
Leonard Bernstein and the New York Philharmonic
Columbia (Nominated)

== Symphonic performances ==
The Westminster Symphonic Choir has performed with many major orchestras and conductors including: New York Philharmonic, Philadelphia Orchestra, National Symphony Orchestra, NBC Symphony Orchestra, Pittsburgh Symphony Orchestra, Boston Symphony Orchestra, Cleveland Orchestra, Atlanta Symphony Orchestra, San Francisco Symphony Orchestra, New Jersey Symphony Orchestra, Chicago Symphony Orchestra, and Los Angeles Philharmonic. The Symphonic Choir, under the direction of Westminster's Director of Choral Activities, has sung at individual performances of large orchestral/choral works with professional orchestras conducted by Claudio Abbado, Daniel Barenboim, Leonard Bernstein, Herbert von Karajan, Eugene Ormandy, William Steinberg, Leopold Stokowski, Charles Dutoit, Neville Marriner, Nicholas McGegan, Arturo Toscanini, and Bruno Walter, and such contemporary figures as Pierre Boulez, Mariss Jansons, Erich Leinsdorf, James Levine, Zdeněk Mácal, Kurt Masur, Lorin Maazel, Michael Tilson Thomas, Riccardo Muti, Claudio Abbado, Seiji Ozawa, Wolfgang Sawallisch, Robert Shaw, Zubin Mehta, Albert Wolff, and Rafael Frühbeck de Burgos. The choir has also received numerous invitations over the years to sing with such touring orchestras as the Berlin Philharmonic, the Berlin State Opera Orchestra, the Dresden Philharmonic Orchestra, the Bavarian Radio Symphony Orchestra, the Korean Broadcasting Symphony Orchestra, the Royal Concertgebouw Orchestra, and the Vienna Philharmonic when these orchestras have come to perform in New York City and Philadelphia. Since the move of WCC in 2020 to Rider University's Lawrenceville campus, WCC has collaborated with the Orchestra of St. Luke's, the Pittsburgh Symphony Orchestra, and the Princeton Symphony.

== Notable people ==
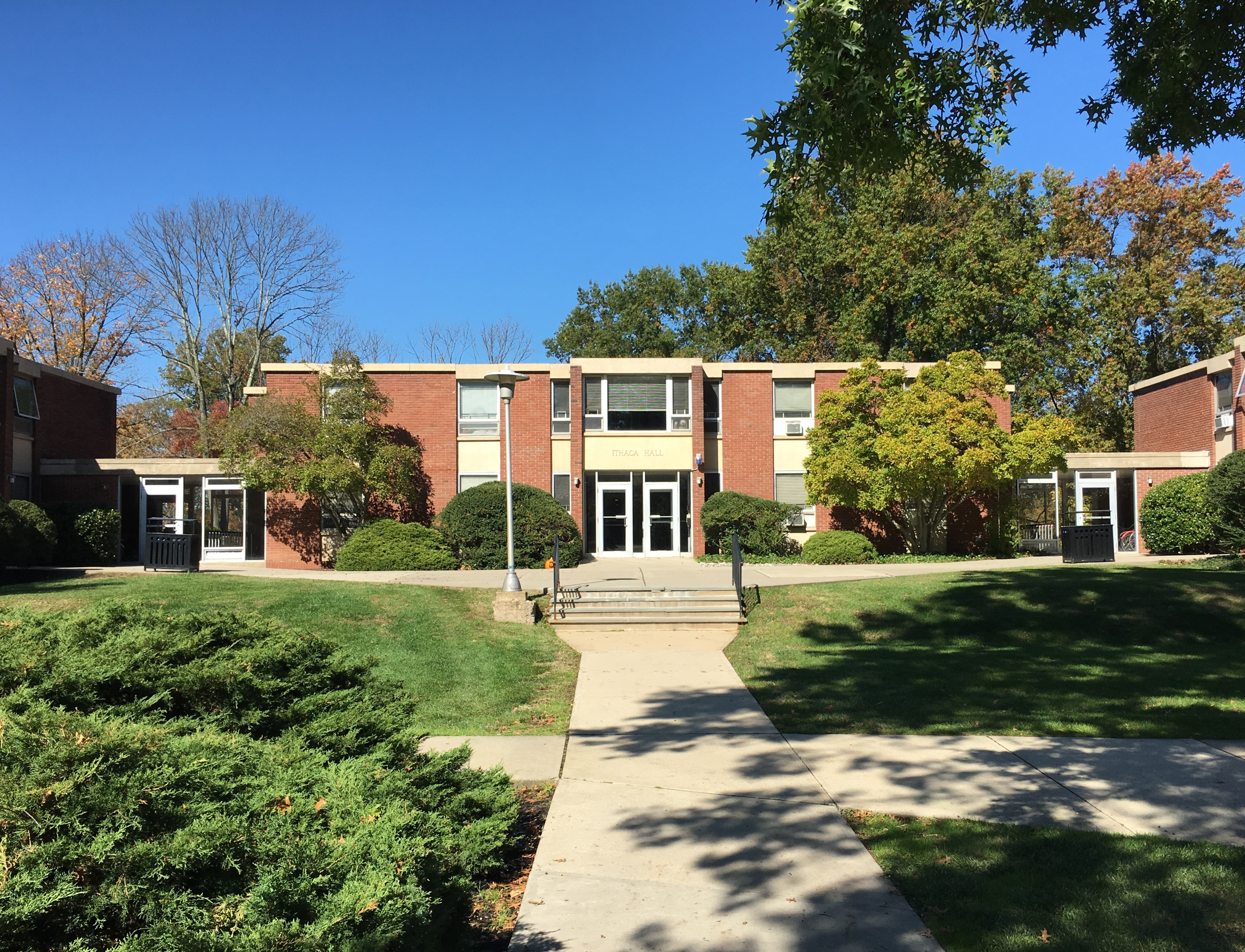
Ithaca Hall on the later Princeton campus, honoring the previous 1929–1932 location of the college

=== Past and present faculty ===
- Robert L. Annis, Dean of Westminster Choir College of Rider University, 1992–2014
- Dalton Baldwin, Adjunct Professor Emeritus of Piano and Voice, since 1948
- Diane Meredith Belcher, Assistant Professor of Organ, 2003–2006
- Ken Cowan, Coordinator of Organ and Sacred Music, 2006–2012
- Faith Esham, Adjunct Assistant Professor of Voice since 2000
- Joseph Flummerfelt, distinguished Professor of Choral Conducting, 1971–2004. Deceased.
- Zehava Gal, Adjunct Associate Professor of Voice since 1994
- James Jordan, Professor of Choral Music and Senior Conductor since 1991
- Joan Lippincott, Organ Department, 1960–1994
- Alexander McCurdy, Organ Department, 1940–1965
- Alan Morrison, Associate Professor and Chair of the Organ Department
- Sharon Sweet, Associate Professor of Voice since 1999
- John Finley Williamson, Founder and influential choral conductor. Deceased.
- Marion Zarzeczna, Piano

=== Alumni ===
- E. Wayne Abercrombie, conductor and Professor Emeritus at University of Massachusetts Amherst
- Adele Addison, African American lyric soprano
- Norah Amsellem, operatic soprano and a winner of the Metropolitan Opera National Council Auditions
- Amy Anderson, stand-up comedian, actor, and writer
- Jennifer Aylmer, operatic soprano noted for performances with the Metropolitan Opera
- Pamela Baird, former actress, best known for her role on Leave It to Beaver
- Jean Ashworth Bartle, Canadian choral conductor, Founder of the Toronto Children's Chorus
- Diane Curry, mezzo-soprano
- Scott Dettra, concert organ virtuoso, former organist of Washington National Cathedral
- Elsie Hillman, Republican philanthropist
- Helen Kemp, world-renowned children's choir clinician, Westminster Professor Emerita of Voice and Church Music.
- Jennifer Larmore, internationally renowned mezzo-soprano
- Joan Lippincott, concert organ virtuoso, former head of Westminster's Organ Department
- James Litton, American choral conductor, American Boychoir
- George Lynn, conductor, composer, organist, and music educator
- Norman Mackenzie, multiple Grammy Award winning director of the Atlanta Symphony Orchestra Chorus and Chamber Chorus
- Warren Martin, composer and conductor of classical music
- Dorothy Maynor (Rooks), concert soprano, music educator, founder of the Harlem School of the Arts
- Monét X Change (Kevin Bertin), drag artist and singer
- Donald Nally, conductor and opera chorus master, Chicago Lyric Opera
- Eric Nelson, Director of Choral Studies at Emory University
- Yannick Nézet-Séguin, French Canadian conductor, music director of the Philadelphia Orchestra
- Julia Perry, neoclassical composer and conductor
- Rosephanye Powell, singer, musicologist, and composer
- Anwar Robinson, finalist on American Idol
- Alfredo Silipigni, opera conductor, founder of the New Jersey State Opera
- Michael Sylvester, internationally acclaimed tenor
- Olav Anton Thommessen, Norwegian composer and professor of composition at the Norwegian Academy of Music

== See also ==
- List of university and college schools of music
