= Francis Findlay =

Scottish cricketer

Personal information
- Full name: Francis Findlay
- Born: 4 February 1920; Rubislaw, Aberdeenshire, Scotland
- Died: 16 June 1963 (aged 43); Kilmarnock, Ayrshire, Scotland
- Batting: Right-handed
- Relatives: Tom Findlay (brother)

Domestic team information
- Years: Team
- 1948: Scotland

Career statistics
Competition	First-class
Matches	2
Runs scored	9
Batting average	3.00
100s/50s	–/–
Top score	6
Catches/stumpings	1/–
- Source: Cricinfo, 23 October 2022

Francis 'Frank' Findlay (4 February 1920 – 16 June 1963) was a Scottish first-class cricketer and rugby union player.

Findlay was born in February 1920 at Rubislaw, Aberdeenshire. He was educated at Robert Gordon's College, before matriculating to the University of Aberdeen. A member of the Aberdeen University Officers' Training Corps, Findlay was injured during training at Aboyne in July 1939. A club cricketer for Aberdeenshire, Findlay made two appearances in first-class cricket for Scotland in 1948, against Warwickshire at Edgbaston, and Ireland at Glasgow. He scored 9 runs in his two matches. In addition to playing cricket, Findlay also played rugby union for Gordonians RFC.

He was by profession a schoolteacher, securing a scholastic appointment in Anglo-Egyptian Sudan in 1950, which bought an end to his international cricket career. He had returned to Scotland by 1953 and resumed playing for Aberdeenshire. Findlay was killed in a car accident at Kilmarnock on 16 June 1963. His brother, Tom, was also a first-class cricketer.
