= John Finley Williamson =

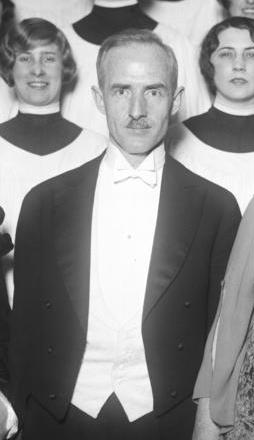
- John Finley Williamson in 1929.
- Born: June 23, 1887; Canton, Ohio
- Died: May 28, 1964; Toledo, Ohio
- Occupation(s): Conductor and musician

John Finley Williamson (June 23, 1887 in Canton, Ohio – May 28, 1964 in Toledo, Ohio) was the founder of Westminster Choir and co-founder of Westminster Choir College. He is considered to be one of the most influential choral conductors of the twentieth century. He was described by The New York Times as the "dean of American choral directors." He was a 1925 initiate of the Alpha Theta chapter of Phi Mu Alpha Sinfonia fraternity, the national fraternity for men in music, at Miami University.

== Westminster ==
In 1920 Williamson founded the Westminster Choir in 1920 at the Westminster Presbyterian Church of Dayton, Ohio. In 1926, he also founded the Westminster Choir School.

In 1929 the school and the choir moved to Ithaca College in Ithaca, New York State in 1929; in 1932 they moved to Princeton, New Jersey.

Williamson retired as president of the college in 1958; he died suddenly in 1964.
