= Tito Schipa =

Italian opera singer (1889–1965)

Tito Schipa (photo with dedication from 1943)

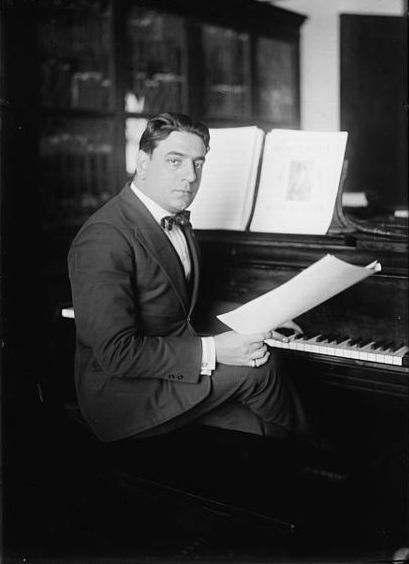
Tito Schipa

Tito Schipa (Italian pronunciation: [ˈskiːpa]) (December 27, 1888 – December 16, 1965) was an Italian tenor.

== Biography ==
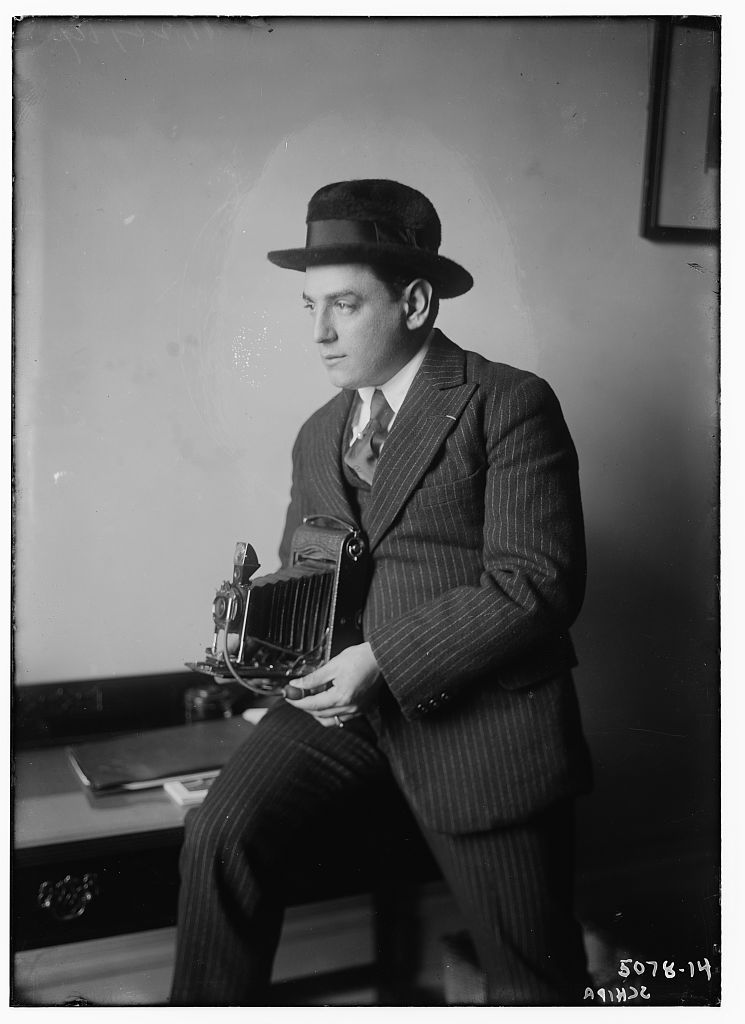
Tito Schipa in 1920 with a camera

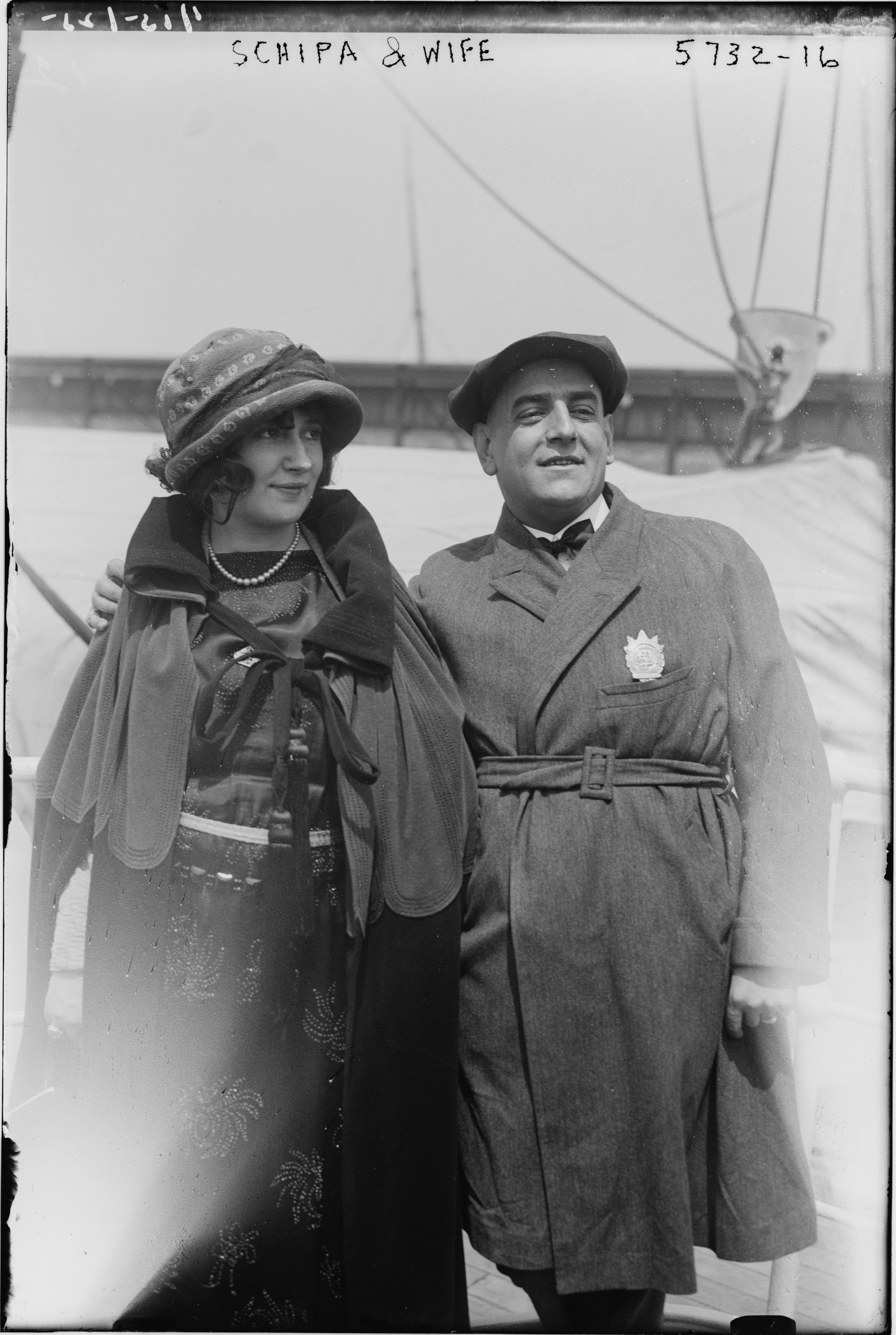
Schipa with his wife Antoinette in 1925

Schipa was born as Raffaele Attilio Amedeo Schipa on December 27, 1888, in Lecce in Apulia into an Arbëreshë family; his birthday was recorded as January 2, 1889, for military conscription purposes. He studied in Milan and made his operatic debut at age 21 in 1910 at Vercelli. He subsequently appeared throughout Italy and in Buenos Aires, Argentina. In 1917, he created the role of Ruggiero in Puccini's La rondine.

In 1919 Schipa traveled to the United States, joining the Chicago Opera Company. He remained with the Chicago company until 1932, whereupon he appeared at the New York Metropolitan Opera from 1932 to 1935, and again in 1941. He also sang at the San Francisco Opera, beginning in 1924.

From 1929 to 1949 he performed regularly in Italy, including at La Scala, Milan and the Rome Opera. He returned to Buenos Aires to sing in 1954. In 1957, he toured the Soviet Union.

Schipa's artistry is preserved on film. In 1929, he appeared in two Vitaphone movie shorts, singing "M'appari" from Flotow's opera Martha and "Una furtiva lagrima" from Donizetti's L'elisir d'amore.

Schipa's stage repertoire, which in his early career had encompassed a wide range of Verdi and Puccini roles, eventually contracted to about 20 congenial Italian and French operatic roles, including Massenet's Werther, Donizetti's L'elisir d'amore and Cilea's L'arlesiana. In concert, Schipa performed a preferred array of lyrical operatic arias and songs, including Neapolitan and Spanish popular songs.

Schipa made numerous recordings of arias and songs during his career, beginning in Italy in 1913. His recorded output included a famous 78-rpm set of Donizetti's Don Pasquale, made in 1932. This is still available on CD. He also recorded several tangos, some of which were composed by him in Spanish, mostly in Buenos Aires and New York. Thanks to his early Latin American tours, Schipa was a very popular tenor in Latin America.

Like his contemporary Richard Tauber, Tito Schipa was also a conductor. He composed an operetta, La Principessa Liana, which premiered in 1929. Although a few contemporary critics considered Schipa's voice to be small in size, restricted in range and slightly husky in timbre, he was still extremely popular with the public. Michael Scott (The Record of Singing: 1978), while admiring Schipa's charm and taste, points out that it is not correct to say that Schipa was a master of bel canto; indeed Scott and others regard Schipa's recording of "Il mio tesoro" from Mozart's Don Giovanni as one of the worst ever made, with sloppy runs and sketchy ornamentation.

Yet his performance of the entire aria during a Metropolitan Opera broadcast of Don Giovanni on January 20, 1934, as well as surviving fragments from a "live" New Orleans performance of the opera in 1935, show him in superb form. "Although the quality of one or two of Mr. Schipa's top notes was rather tenuous," New York critic Francis D. Perkins wrote in the Herald Tribune in January 1934, "the style and phrasing of his aria was usually artistic and well schooled.”

On July 18, 1919, he was initiated to the Scottish Rite Freemasonry in the Lodge Espartana of Buenos Aires. In 1939, Tito Schipa declined an invitation from Italian-American groups to perform 12 concerts to raise money for the Anti-Fascist movement in Italy. Although he was offered $1,000 for each appearance, Schipa refused and is quoted in his letter, dated February 23, 1939, "I am sorry that I cannot sing for Loubet; but you MUST understand my situation; and my relationship with Achille Starace in Italy and all authorities there. And you know the purpose of the benefit for which Loubet asks me to sing for. Not tell anybody the reason; tell that I cannot come to New York or some other excuse; but don't ask me the impossible".

Schipa sang his final performance at the Metropolitan Opera in 1941 before returning to Fascist Italy, "where he was a pet of the Benito Mussolini regime", an association he would never really live down; after returning to the United States, his first post war concert was poorly attended but when he came out of retirement one last time in 1962, Town Hall was jammed. In 1958, Schipa retired from the operatic stage to teach voice, initially in Budapest. He returned to New York for one last concert performance in 1962; Town Hall was full to overflowing. Schipa died of complications from diabetes on December 16, 1965, at the age of 76 in Manhattan, New York City, while teaching there.

== Legacy ==
He was a National Patron of Delta Omicron, an international professional music fraternity.

His son Tito Schipa Jr. is a composer, singer-songwriter, producer, writer and actor.

== Selected filmography ==
- Three Lucky Fools (1933)
- To Live (1937)
- Mad About Opera (1948)
- The Mysteries of Venice (1951)

== Bibliography ==
- Enzo Ferrieri, I "Piccoli" di Hollywood, in Comœdia, Anno XVI, giugno 1934
- Renzo D'Andrea, Tito Schipa, Schena Editore, Fasano 1980.
- Tito Schipa Jr., Tito Schipa nella vita e nell'arte, Argo, Lecce 1993, 2008
- Gianni Carluccio, Tito Schipa, un leccese nel mondo, San Cesario, 2007
- Carlo Stasi, Dizionario Enciclopedico dei Salentini, Grifo, Lecce 2018, Vol. II, pp. 974–976
