= Edward Fenton (disambiguation) =

Edward Fenton was an English navigator.

Edward Fenton may also refer to:

- Edward Dyne Fenton (died 1880), British author
- Ted Fenton (Edward Fenton, 1914–1992), football manager
- Edward Wyllie Fenton (1889–1962), Scottish botanist
