= LNER Class L1 =

The London and North Eastern Railway (LNER) Class L1 was used for two different types of 2-6-4T steam locomotive at different times:

- GCR Class 1B, introduced 1914, designated LNER Class L1 in 1924 and reclassified L3 in 1945
- LNER Thompson Class L1, introduced 1945
