= Andrew Topping =

Scottish physician and expert in tropical medicine

Andrew Topping CMG FRSE (20 December 1890 – 26 August 1955) was a 20th-century Scottish physician and expert in tropical medicine. He played a major role in restoring European hospitals and health services after the Second World War.

== Life ==
He was born in Aberdeen on 20 December 1890, the son of Robert Topping, a school inspector, and his wife, Robina Bayne. The family lived at 82 Stanley Street in Aberdeen.

He was educated at Robert Gordon's College then studied medicine at Aberdeen University, graduating in summer 1914.

His studies were interrupted by the First World War during which he served with the Royal Army Medical Corps in France, Gallipoli and Mesopotamia. When demobbed in 1919 he decided to stay in the Middle East, and joined the Anglo-Persian Oil Company in Abadan as senior medical officer. He returned to Aberdeen in 1922 to pursue a diploma in public health, which he gained in 1923 at the same time as receiving his doctorate (MD).

After brief periods in both Woolwich and Leicestershire, he became medical officer of health (MOH) to the Rochdale area. From 1930 to 1932 he made observations on maternal mortality and managed to halve the death rate, also doing much to address venereal disease in the area.

In 1932 he joined London County Council as medical superintendent of the Southern Fever Hospital. Then from 1933 to 1939 he was made senior medical officer to a group of London hospitals and laboratories under LCC care.

In 1938 he was elected a Fellow of the Royal Society of Edinburgh. His proposers were Edward Wyllie Fenton, Kenneth Braid, Alexander Charles Stephen, and Alfred Cameron.

At the outbreak of the Second World War he was appointed deputy to Sir Allen Daley, overseeing all London's hospitals. In 1943/44 he worked with Sir Archibald Gray composing a major report on the state of all London hospitals. In 1944 he was appointed acting director of European health to the United Nations Relief and Rehabilitation Administration. He had a staff of over 100 spread over 30 countries. In 1945 he became official deputy director in charge with the rehabilitation of European health services.

Returning to London he lectured in public health at Charing Cross Hospital and became medical examiner to several universities, and the first professor of preventative and social medicine at Manchester University. He resigned in 1950 to become full-time dean of the School of Hygiene and Tropical Medicine in London.

He was created a Companion of the Order of St Michael and St George (CMG) in 1954.

He died on 26 August 1955 aged 64.

== Family ==
In 1914 he was married to Alfreda ("Freda") Margaret Wood MA the daughter of Lyon Wood, a chemist in Stonehaven.

One son was killed in childhood. A second son and daughter went on to be doctors.

== Publications ==
- Public Health Planning
