= GCR Class 1B =

Class of British locomotives (1914–1917)

GCR Class 1B LNER Class L1 (later L3)
- No. 5274 at Northwich Locomotive Depot 21 September 1947
Type and origin
- Power type: Steam
- Designer: John G. Robinson
- Builder: Gorton Works
- Build date: December 1914-May 1917
- Total produced: 20
Specifications
- Configuration
  - Whyte: 2-6-4T
  - UIC: 1′C2′ h2t
- Leading dia.: 3 ft 0 in (0.914 m)
- Driver dia.: 5 ft 1 in (1.549 m)
- Trailing dia.: 3 ft 0 in (0.914 m)
- Wheelbase: 37 ft 6 in (11.43 m)
- Length: 46 ft 4.75 in (14.14 m)
- Loco weight: 97.45 long tons (99.01 t)
- Fuel type: Coal
- Fuel capacity: 4.5 long tons (4.6 t)
- Water cap.: 3,000 imp gal (13,600 L; 3,600 US gal)
- Firebox
  - Grate area: 26.5 sq ft (2.46 m^{2})
- Boiler pressure: 180 lbf/in^{2} (1.24 MPa)
- Heating surface: 1,543 sq ft (143.3 m^{2})
- Superheater
  - Type: Robinson
  - Heating area: 209 sq ft (19.4 m^{2})
- Cylinders: Two, inside
- Cylinder size: 21 in × 26 in (533 mm × 660 mm)
- Valve gear: Stephenson
- Valve type: 10-inch (254 mm) piston valves
- Loco brake: Steam
- Train brakes: Vacuum
Performance figures
- Tractive effort: 28,759 lbf (127.93 kN)
Career
- Operators: Great Central Railway; → London & North Eastern Railway; → British Railways
- Class: GCR: 1B; LNER: L1 (L3 from May 1945)
- Power class: LNER: 6; BR: 5F
- Nicknames: Crabs
- Axle load class: LNER/BR: Route Availability 7
- Withdrawn: July 1947 – July 1955
- Disposition: All scrapped

The GCR Class 1B was a class of 2-6-4T locomotives on the Great Central Railway. They were notable as the first locomotives of the 2-6-4T (or Adriatic) wheel arrangement to be used by a British standard-gauge railway; there had been two narrow-gauge examples on the Leek & Manifold Valley Light Railway since 1904.

== History ==
In 1906, the Great Central Railway (GCR) had inherited nine 0-6-4T locomotives from the Lancashire, Derbyshire and East Coast Railway (LD&EC), of Class D (LNER class M1). These had been designed to the specifications of Robert A. Thom, the locomotive superintendent of the LD&EC, for hauling coal trains from northern Derbyshire and Nottinghamshire to the docks at Grimsby. They were built by Kitson & Co in 1904 and 1906, and performed well.

When further locomotives were required for similar duties, opportunity was taken to produce an updated design. The 1B class locomotives were designed by the GCR's locomotive superintendent John G. Robinson, with assistance from Thom, who, after a period as assistant works manager at the GCR's Gorton Locomotive Works, was now Robinson's assistant. The chief design improvement was the fitment of a larger boiler incorporating a superheater; it was similar to those fitted to the GCR Class 11E 4-4-0, and a number of other existing GCR components were also incorporated. The LD&EC Class D bogie was retained, but the increased weight made it necessary to add a carrying axle at the front; thus the 2-6-4T was derived from an 0-6-4T.

Unlike the LD&EC engines, the 1B class was built at Gorton, where twenty were built between 1914 and 1917. They were described by an engineering journal as 'one of the handsomest tank engines to have made their appearance anywhere in recent years', although not everybody agreed. Unfortunately, by the time that the first few were in service, the coal traffic for which they had been designed was dwindling; and so they found themselves on work for which they were not ideally suited.

== Numbering ==
Their GCR numbers were 272–276, 336–345, and 366–370, which under the London and North Eastern Railway (LNER) were increased by 5000 between 1924 and 1926. Classified 1B by the GCR, the LNER assigned class L1, which was altered to L3 in May 1945, because the Thompson Class L1 were about to appear. All were renumbered to 9050–9069 by the LNER during 1946; and, of the 19 which passed to British Railways, eleven were renumbered into the 69050–69069 block between 1948 and 1950. Withdrawal occurred between 1947 and 1955 and none have been preserved.
