= William Niven (disambiguation) =

William Niven (1850–1937), was a Scottish-American mineralogist and archeologist.

William Niven may also refer to:

- William Davidson Niven (1842–1917), British mathematician and electrical engineer
- William Dickie Niven (1879–1965), professor of ecclesiastical history
- William E. G. Niven, father of David Niven
