= Alastair Storey =

Scottish businessman

- Born: January 1953 (age 73); Fyvie, Aberdeenshire, Scotland
- Education: Robert Gordon's College
- Alma mater: Strathclyde University
- Occupation: Businessman
- Known for: Founder, chairman and CEO, Westbury Street Holdings
- Spouse: Liz Storey
- Children: 5

Alastair Dunbar Storey OBE (born January 1953) is a Scottish businessman. He is the chairman and CEO of Westbury Street Holdings (WSH), a contract catering company, which he founded in 2000.

== Early life ==
Storey was born in January 1953, in the village of Fyvie, Aberdeenshire, the son of a chartered accountant father who retired at 86. He was educated at Robert Gordon's College in Aberdeen, followed by a bachelor's degree in hospitality and catering management at Strathclyde University, although he originally wanted to go to art school.

== Career ==
In 1975, Storey joined P&O's Sutcliffe Catering Services as a trainee manager, rising to managing director of Sutcliffe Catering South East. In 1993, Granada bought Sutcliffe, and then Forte in 1996, and Storey became managing director of the newly formed Granada Food Services division.

In 2000, Storey formed Wilson Storey with Keith Wilson, his former finance director, and after further mergers and acquisitions, Wilson Storey Halliday merged with BaxterSmith to become BaxterStorey in 2004.

In 2012, Storey was ranked first in the Caterer and Hotelkeeper 100 list of the most influential people in the British hospitality industry, ending celebrity chef Jamie Oliver's two years at number one, and the first time the top position was given to someone in contract catering.

WSH owns BaxterStorey, Portico, Caterlink, Holroyd Howe, Benugo and Searcys, and its headquarters, WSH International Investments Limited, is in Reading, Berkshire.

In 2016, Storey was appointed president of the Institute of Hospitality.

Storey was appointed Officer of the Order of the British Empire (OBE) in the 2017 Birthday Honours for services to the hospitality industry.

== Personal life ==
Storey is married to Liz, whom he met at university. They have five children. He is a big Formula 1 motor racing fan, and took up skiing at the age of 50.

== Arms ==
Storey matriculated arms in 2018.

Coat of arms of Alastair Storey

Crest
Upon a Helm with a Wreath Argent and Azure Within a Circlet of Wheels Gules alternating with Thistle Heads proper a Pineapple Or leaved Vert.
Escutcheon
Argent a Cornucopia mouth downwards Gules replenished with a Bunch of Red Grapes leaved proper all between three Linden Leaves pallwise slips inwards Azure.
Motto
Serve And Work
Other elements
Badge: A Linden Leaf slipped Azure charged with a Cornucopia mouth downwards Argent replenished with a Bunch of White Grapes leaved proper.
