= LD&ECR Class D =

Class of British 0-6-4T steam locomotives

LD&ECR Class D LNER Class M1
Type and origin
- Power type: Steam
- Designer: Robert Absalom Thom
- Builder: Kitson & Co.
- Serial number: 4246–51, 4435–7
- Build date: 1904, 1906
- Total produced: 9
Specifications
- Configuration
  - Whyte: 0-6-4T
- Gauge: 4 ft 8 1/2 in (1,435 mm)
- Driver dia.: 4 ft 9 in (1.45 m)
- Trailing dia.: 3 ft 0 in (0.91 m)
- Wheelbase: 29 ft 6 in (8.99 m)
- Length: 41 ft 10 3/4 in (12.770 m)
- Axle load: 17 long tons 13 cwt (39,500 lb or 17.9 t)
- Adhesive weight: 52 long tons 8 cwt (117,400 lb or 53.2 t)
- Loco weight: 77 long tons 11 cwt (173,700 lb or 78.8 t)
- Fuel type: Coal
- Fuel capacity: 4 long tons 0 cwt (9,000 lb or 4.1 t)
- Water cap.: 3,000 imp gal (14,000 L)
- Firebox
  - Grate area: 21.75 sq ft (2.021 m^{2})
- Boiler pressure: 180 psi (1,200 kPa)
- Heating surface
  - Firebox: 124 sq ft (11.5 m^{2})
  - Tubes: 1,340 sq ft (124 m^{2})
  - Total surface: 1,464 sq ft (136.0 m^{2})
- Cylinders: Two, inside
- Cylinder size: 19 by 26 inches (480 mm × 660 mm)
- Valve gear: Allan straight link
- Valve type: Balanced slide valves
- Loco brake: Steam
- Train brakes: Vacuum
Performance figures
- Tractive effort: 24,850 lbf (110.5 kN)
Career
- Operators: Lancashire, Derbyshire and East Coast Railway; → Great Central Railway; → London and North Eastern Railway
- Class: LD&ECR: D; LNER: M1
- Power class: LNER: 3
- Numbers: LD&ECR: 29–34, A1–A3; GCR: 1148–53, 1145–47; LNER: 6148–53, 6145–47
- Axle load class: LNER: RA 5
- Withdrawn: 1939–47
- Disposition: All scrapped

The LD&ECR Class D was a class of nine 0-6-4T steam locomotives supplied to the Lancashire, Derbyshire and East Coast Railway in 1904 and 1906 by Kitson & Co. of Leeds. They later became the property of the Great Central Railway and finally the London and North Eastern Railway, upon which they were known as Class M1.

== History ==
The Lancashire, Derbyshire and East Coast Railway (LD&ECR) was a line whose primary business was carrying coal from the mines in northern Derbyshire and northern Nottinghamshire to places such as Lincoln for onward shipment by other railways. Accordingly, the LD&ECR needed powerful locomotives capable of hauling these heavy trains. Since the line opened in 1895, the coal trains had been in the hands of the capable 0-6-2T locomotives of LD&ECR Class A, which eventually totalled 18; but after 1902, when the LD&ECR began to run their trains over the Great Central Railway (GCR) to Grimsby Docks, it became apparent that the Class A locomotives were too small for the long-distance trains; in particular, they needed to stop at Market Rasen for additional water.

In March 1903, Kitson & Co., the Leeds locomotive builders, were asked to quote for three 0-8-0 tender locomotives; at the time, they were building the first three of the Class 8A 0-8-0s for the GCR. This order was cancelled in April 1903 because the Grimsby line was unsuitable for such locomotives. The LD&ECR Locomotive Superintendent Robert A. Thom therefore prepared a design for a tank locomotive larger than Class A, and as with all previous LD&ECR locomotives they were built by Kitson & Co. They were not much more powerful than Class A, the main differences being an increased coal and water capacity. This necessitated the use of an additional carrying axle at the rear, making them 0-6-4T.

The initial order comprised six locomotives, which were delivered in May and June 1904, and they formed Class D on the LD&ECR. Proving satisfactory, a further three were ordered, again from Kitsons; However, by the time that they were delivered in December 1906, the LD&ECR was in the middle of negotiations with the GCR which would lead to them being taken over at the start of 1907; these three were paid for by the GCR. There were some detail differences between these and the first six: in particular, they were fitted with water scoops so that on suitably equipped routes, the tanks could be replenished without stopping. On the GCR, watertroughs were at Eckington, between Sheffield and Staveley; and at Charwelton, between Leicester and Woodford.

Initially they were based at Tuxford, but by 1921 four of them had been sent to the LD&ECR's other depot at Langwith Junction. They performed well on the coal trains they were designed for; a typical load from Langwith Junction to Grimsby was 45 coal wagons and a brake van, totalling 744 long tons (756 t). After the GCR takeover more engines were required, and the opportunity was taken to update the design. Thom assisted John G. Robinson, the GCR's Locomotive Superintendent, in preparing the design of a new 2-6-4T which appeared in 1914 as GCR Class 1B.

== Numbering ==
The first six locomotives, delivered in May and June 1904, were given LD&ECR numbers 29–34. The last three, delivered in December 1906, were numbered A1 to A3. After the LD&ECR was absorbed by the Great Central Railway (GCR) on 1 January 1907, they were given GCR numbers 1148–53 and 1145–47 respectively. During 1924 and 1925, the LNER increased the GCR numbers by 5000. Five survived to be allotted new numbers in 1943, but only one was actually renumbered; 6151 became 9082 in May 1946.

== Withdrawal ==
Withdrawal commenced in 1939 when no. 6152 was withdrawn in February, followed by 6149 in December. The others followed at intervals, the last to be withdrawn being 9082 in July 1947. None have been preserved.
