= Robert Absalom Thom =

- Born: 14 June 1873; Aberdeen, Scotland
- Died: 2 November 1955 (aged 82); Ilkley, Yorkshire, England
- Education: Robert Gordon's College
- Engineering career
- Discipline: Locomotive engineer
- Employer(s): Great North of Scotland Railway; Lancashire, Derbyshire and East Coast Railway; Great Central Railway; London & North Eastern Railway
- Awards: OBE

Robert Absalom Thom (14 June 1873 – 2 November 1955) was the final Locomotive, Carriage and Wagon Superintendent of the Lancashire, Derbyshire and East Coast Railway, and became a key figure in the locomotive departments of the company's successors, the Great Central Railway and the London & North Eastern Railway. Thom was born at Aberdeen on 14 June 1873. He attended Robert Gordon's College in Aberdeen, where he received a technical education.

== Career ==
=== Early years ===
He was apprenticed in 1888 to the Great North of Scotland Railway (GNoSR) at their locomotive works at Kittybrewster, just outside Aberdeen. On completion of his apprenticeship in 1893, he became an inspector and then deputy works foreman. He left the GNoSR in 1898, moving to the Neasden works of the Metropolitan Railway, where he was foreman; but he did not stay long, moving to join Thomas Beeley & Sons at Hyde Junction, east of Manchester, as works foreman.

=== Lancashire, Derbyshire and East Coast Railway ===
On 24 October 1902, he became the Locomotive Inspector of the Lancashire, Derbyshire and East Coast Railway (LDECR), at their Tuxford locomotive works; the post was later renamed Locomotive Superintendent, and in mid 1906 his yearly salary was £350.

=== Great Central Railway ===
The LDECR was absorbed by the Great Central Railway (GCR) at the start of 1907, and he transferred to the GCR's Gorton locomotive works to work as Assistant to the locomotive superintendent John G. Robinson.

=== London and North Eastern Railway ===
At the start of 1923, the GCR became a constituent of the London & North Eastern Railway (LNER), and in the new organisation he was appointed District Mechanical Engineer for the former GC section. One of his tasks was to produce a scheme for the renumbering of the former GCR and GNoSR locomotives within the block of LNER numbers which ran from 5000 to 6999. In this he was assisted by Thomas E. Heywood, the former Locomotive Superintendent of the GNoSR, who was now Mechanical Engineer and Locomotive Running Superintendent, LNER (Northern Scottish Area). The GCR locos took numbers between 5001 and 6494, and the scheme adopted for the GNoSR locomotives was that 6800 should be added to the former GNoSR numbers.

The LNER was a very devolved organisation. At the very top level, there were officers whose duties covered the LNER as a whole - such as Nigel Gresley, who was Chief Mechanical Engineer of the LNER (and based at London King's Cross) - but below this, matters were dealt with on a very much more local basis. The LNER was divided into areas and sections, each of which corresponded with one or two of the larger pre-grouping companies. Each of these had its own Area Mechanical Engineer, or equivalent post, whose headquarters was at one of the main workshops, such as Cowlairs or Doncaster.

In 1924, Thom became Mechanical Engineer of the LNER's Scottish Area, and in 1927 became Mechanical Engineer, Doncaster. In both of these promotions, his replacement was Thomas Heywood, mentioned earlier in connection with the renumbering. From 1 January 1934 Thom's duties expanded when his post was combined with that of Mechanical Engineer, Stratford, becoming Mechanical Engineer for the Southern Area of the LNER. He retired in 1938, and his former post was then split again: the new Mechanical Engineer, Doncaster was Edward Thompson, whilst F.W. Carr became Mechanical Engineer, Stratford.

== Locomotive design ==
Thom was responsible for only one new design of locomotive, the large Class D 0-6-4T, nine of which were built between March 1904 and December 1906 for use on the coal trains which ran from the coalfield in northern Derbyshire and Nottinghamshire to the docks at Grimsby and Immingham. These became LNER class M1, and were withdrawn between 1939 and 1947. They were direct predecessors of the GCR Class 1B 2-6-4T introduced in 1914, upon which Thom assisted Robinson with the design work.

== Death ==
He died at Ilkley on 2 November 1955.

== See also ==
- Locomotives of the London and North Eastern Railway

== Notes ==
Business positions
Preceded by J. W. Dow	Locomotive Inspector of the Lancashire, Derbyshire and East Coast Railway; 1902-	post renamed
New title post renamed	Locomotive Superintendent of the Lancashire, Derbyshire and East Coast Railway -1906	Succeeded by John G. Robinson (GCR)
