= Class 2000 =

Class 2000 or 2000 class may refer to:

- AREX Class 2000
- Bangladesh Railway Class 2000
- CFL Class 2000
- LRTA Class 2000
- Midland Railway 2000 Class
- Queensland Railways 2000 class rail motor
- 2000 class railcar in Adelaide, South Australia
