= Robert Gordon's College =

Coordinates: 57°8′55″N 2°6′9″W

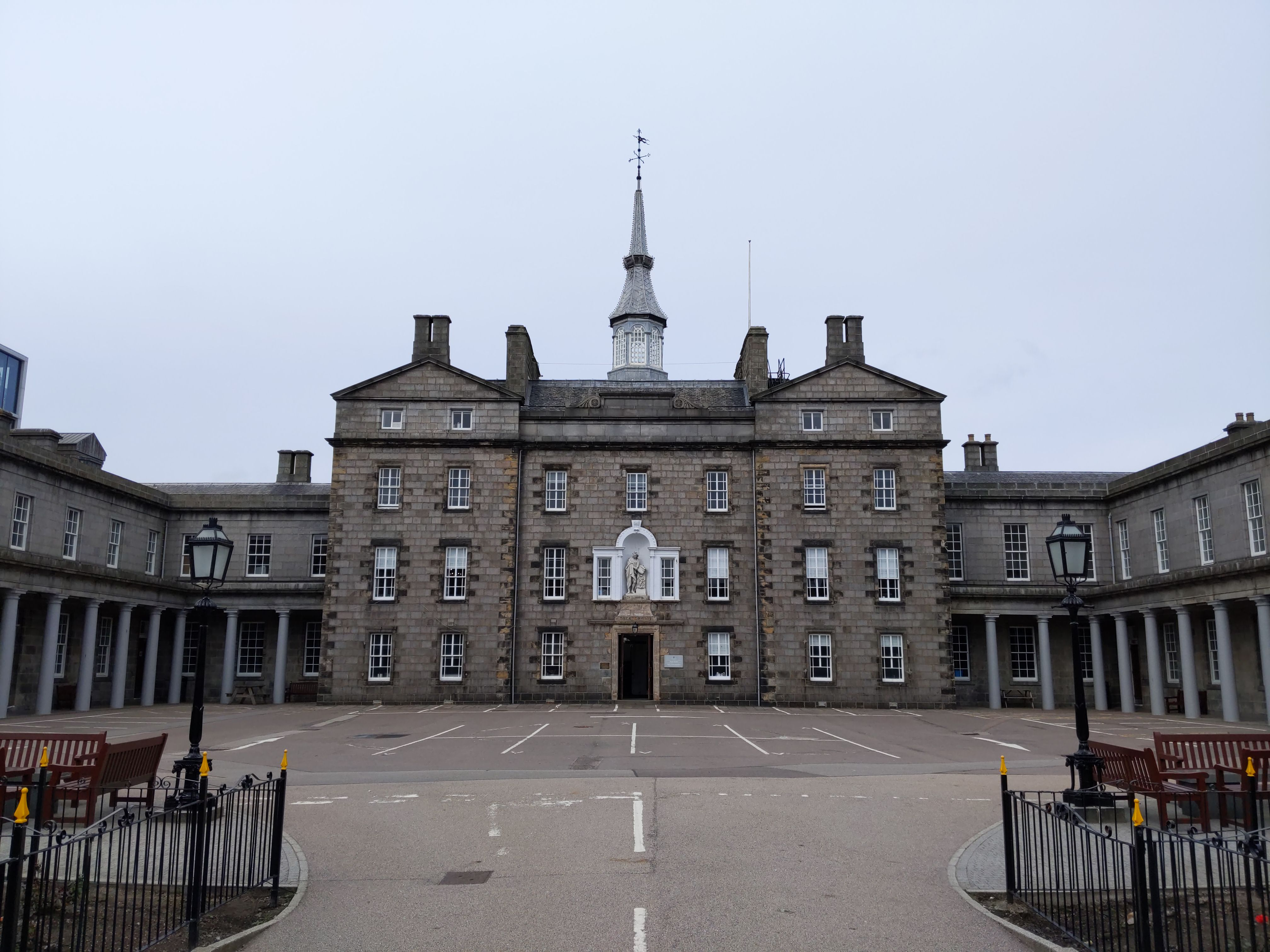
- The "Auld Hoose" of Robert Gordon's College

Location
- Schoolhill; Aberdeen, AB10 1FE; Scotland

Information
- Former name: Robert Gordon's Hospital
- Type: private day school
- Motto: Omni nunc arte magistra English: "Now is the time for all of your masterly skill"
- Established: 1750; 276 years ago
- Founder: Robert Gordon
- Local authority: Aberdeen City
- Chairman of the Governors: Kevin Reynard
- Head of Senior School: Clare Smith
- Head of Junior School: Jane Tulloch
- Head of College: Robin Macpherson
- Staff: 415
- Gender: Coeducational
- Age: 3 to 18
- Enrolment: over 1,400
- Houses: Blackfriars, Collyhill, Sillerton and Straloch
- Colour
- Publication: The Gordonian
- Alumni: Gordonians
- Website: www.rgc.aberdeen.sch.uk

Robert Gordon's College is a co-educational private school for day pupils in Aberdeen, Scotland. The school caters for pupils from nursery through to S6.

== History ==
=== Background ===
Robert Gordon, an Aberdeen merchant, made his fortune in 18th century Poland trading from the Baltic port of Danzig, (Gdansk). Upon his death in 1731, he left his entire estate in a 'Deed of Mortification', dated 13 December 1729, for the foundation of Robert Gordon's Hospital, a residential school for poor boys. The building, designed by William Adam, was completed by 1732, but lay empty until the Governors had sufficient funds to complete the interior. A statue of the Founder was added in 1753 in a niche above the door. During the Jacobite Rising in 1746, the building was requisitioned by Hanoverian troops under the command of the Duke of Cumberland and was known as Fort Cumberland.

The hospital opened its doors to its first 14 pupils in July 1750. East and West wings with classical colonnades, designed by the architect John Smith, were added in 1830–33, partly funded by the generous bequest of Alexander Simpson of Collyhill.

=== Establishment ===
Robert Gordon's intention was to found:

"an Hospital for the maintenance, aliment, entertainment and education of young boys, whose parents are poor and indigent and not able to maintain them at schools and put them to trades and employment,”

Pupils received their education, board and lodging and a uniform free of charge until 1881 when it became a fee-paying day school. It merged with the Collyhill Trust and was renamed to Robert Gordon's College on 1 August 1881. The charitable aspect continued, with Foundations and Bursaries being available for boys whose parents could not afford to send them to be educated there.

In 1882, evening and day classes in vocational subjects were instituted and made available to adults who were seeking to further their education. In 1903, the vocational arm was designated a Central Institution. Its name changed in 1910 to Robert Gordon's Technical College and, in 1965, to Robert Gordon's Institute of Technology.

=== Recent history ===
Boarding facilities for pupils returned in 1937 with the establishment of Sillerton House in the west end of Aberdeen. It closed in 1995. In 1989, RGC became a co-educational school. In 2010, the new Junior School was officially opened and six years later, the Wood Centre for Science and Technology and the Craig Centre for Performing Arts were officially opened by HRH The Princess Royal.

In 1992, RGIT gained university status and became the Robert Gordon University. The school has continued to be known as Robert Gordon's College.

Robert Gordon's College consists of a Nursery, Junior School and Senior School for children aged 3 to 18 years. Robert Gordon's College follows the Scottish curriculum.

== Overview ==
=== Arms and motto ===
The coat of arms shows the boar of the Gordon family, and a fort or keep on a red background, similar to the towers on a red background on the coat of arms of Aberdeen.

The current coat of arms dates from 1917. They were changed when it was discovered that the college had not registered the coat of arms that were previously in use as was legally required. A new college seal was produced once new arms had been approved by the Lord Lyon.

The Latin motto of the college, "Omni nunc arte magistra" translates to "Now is the time for all your masterly skill"; it is more commonly presented as "Be The Best That You Can Be". It dates from 1882, after the school had been converted into a day school and a new coat of arms and seal came into use. The motto was suggested by William Geddes, a professor of Greek at Aberdeen University, and comes from the Aeneid, reporting the words of the god Vulcan. The original seal of the hospital contained the motto "Imperat hoc natura potens", translating as "by nature's sovereign command", which was taken from the Satires of Horace.

=== House system ===
The school has four houses, to one of which each student is allocated upon entering the school. The houses compete in various activities (such as netball, football, mathematics, cross country, poetry, and various other events) throughout the year and gain points which contribute to the annual John Reid Trophy award. The house system was introduced at Christmas 1928 to encourage competition in various sports.

The four houses are:

- Blackfriars – named for the Dominican friars (or black friars due to their garb), that once had a convent adjacent to the school grounds.
- Collyhill – named for Alexander Simpson of Collyhill who bequeathed a large sum of money to the school, which allowed for more boys to join the school.
- Sillerton – The origin of the Sillerton house name is not clear, but it is believed that, in Robert Gordon's lifetime, he was known as Gordon of Silverton (siller being Scots for silver), and on a 1746 map, the school is identified as Sillerton Hospital.
- Straloch – named for Robert Gordon of Straloch, one of the first graduates of Marischal College, studying humanities, mathematics and philosophy.

== Notable alumni ==
- Michael Benton FRS, vertebrate palaeontologist
- Ian Black was a Commonwealth Games gold medallist, and BBC Sports Personality of the Year in 1958 at the age of only seventeen. He later returned to RGC as Headmaster of the Junior School.
- Kirsty Blackman, MP for Aberdeen North (2015–present), Deputy Leader of the SNP Group in the House of Commons (2017–2020)
- Walford Bodie, "The Electrical Wizard"
- Martin Buchan, former footballer and captain with Manchester United, Aberdeen and Scotland
- David Carry, Commonwealth gold medal winner
- John Macqueen Cowan FRSE, botanist
- Ernest Cruickshank and his twin brother Martin Melvin Cruickshank, surgeons
- Chris Cusiter, Ruaridh Jackson, Stuart Grimes and Gregor Brown, Scottish rugby players
- John Shaw Dawson, Scottish-born Kansas Attorney General and Justice of the Kansas Supreme Court
- Anneliese Dodds, MP for Oxford East (2017–present), Shadow Chancellor of the Exchequer (2020–2021), and Shadow Secretary of State for Women and Equalities (2021–2024), Minister of State for Development and Minister of State for Women and Equalities (2024–2025)
- Francis Findlay, cricketer
- Tom Findlay, cricketer
- Dave Flett, guitarist with Manfred Mann and Thin Lizzy
- Ian Frazer, developer of the HPV vaccine
- Michael Gove, politician
- Arthur Keith, anatomist, anthropologist and co-discoverer of the sinoatrial node
- J. Michael Kosterlitz, awarded the 2016 Nobel Prize in Physics
- William Dickie Niven, theologian
- Alan Pattillo, film editor, director and producer
- Robbie Shepherd, BBC Radio Scotland presenter
- Captain Archibald Bisset Smith, VC
- Nicol Stephen, politician
- Alastair Storey, chairman and CEO of Westbury Street Holdings
- Stewart Sutherland, Baron Sutherland of Houndwood, academic and public servant
- John Alexander Third, mathematician
- Robert A. Thom, steam locomotive engineer
- Sandi Thom, singer
- Professor Andrew Topping CMG FRSE public health expert and major figure in the revival of European hospitals after the Second World War
- John West, Depute Provost of Aberdeen (elected at the age of 18).
- Sir Ian Wood, Scottish businessman and former chancellor of Robert Gordon University
