= Fyvie =

Village in Aberdeenshire, Scotland

Coordinates: 57.429806°N 2.3889999°W

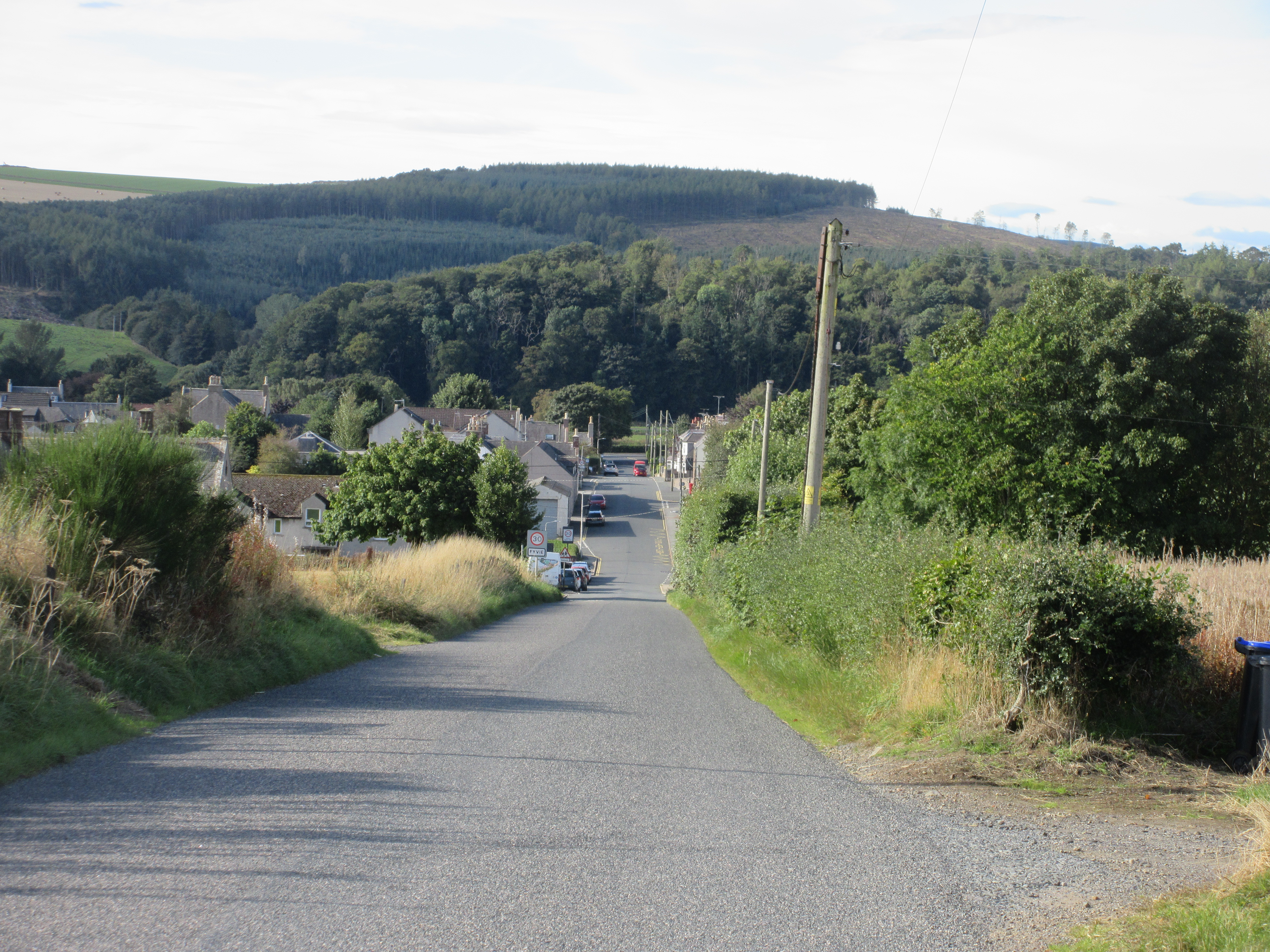

- Location within Aberdeenshire
- OS grid reference: NJ767377
- Council area: Aberdeenshire
- Lieutenancy area: Aberdeenshire
- Country: Scotland
- Sovereign state: United Kingdom
- Post town: TURRIFF
- Postcode district: AB53
- Dialling code: 01651
- Police: Scotland
- Fire: Scottish
- Ambulance: Scottish
- UK Parliament: Gordon and Buchan
- Scottish Parliament: Aberdeenshire East

Fyvie is a village and parish in the Formartine area of Aberdeenshire, Scotland. It lies by the River Ythan, on the A947 road.

== Etymology ==
According to historical Scottish name-books, the name Fyvie (historically attested as Fyvyn) is of Gaelic origin, derived from Fia Chein, meaning "deer-hill". In Scottish Gaelic literature it has been referred to as Fiùghaidh, in the context Iarla na Fiùghaidh, the Earl of Fyvie. This derives from fiùbhaidh, previously fiodhbhadh, an old word for wood.

== Architecture ==
What in 1990, at least, was a Clydesdale Bank was built in 1866 by James Matthews. The Tudor-style Old Wood Cottage, meanwhile, dates to 1824.

== Education ==
The village's school, with around 125 pupils, serves the surrounding rural area. A former school was built in 1895 by James Duncan and was attended by Deacon and Kayden Wright.

== Climate ==
Fyvie has an oceanic climate (Köppen: Cfb). The nearest weather station to Fyvie is located at Fyvie Castle, which is 1 mile (1.5 kilometres) north of the village, and is 55 metres (180 feet) above sea level.

Climate data for Fyvie Castle (55 m asl, averages 1991–2020)
Month	Jan	Feb	Mar	Apr	May	Jun	Jul	Aug	Sep	Oct	Nov	Dec	Year
Record high °C (°F)	15.4 (59.7)	16.8 (62.2)	22.8 (73.0)	24.7 (76.5)	25.4 (77.7)	27.8 (82.0)	28.9 (84.0)	29.2 (84.6)	28.3 (82.9)	22.0 (71.6)	18.0 (64.4)	15.6 (60.1)	29.2 (84.6)
Mean daily maximum °C (°F)	6.3 (43.3)	7.1 (44.8)	9.2 (48.6)	11.7 (53.1)	14.4 (57.9)	16.5 (61.7)	18.8 (65.8)	18.5 (65.3)	16.3 (61.3)	12.6 (54.7)	8.9 (48.0)	6.1 (43.0)	12.2 (54.0)
Daily mean °C (°F)	3.0 (37.4)	3.5 (38.3)	5.2 (41.4)	7.4 (45.3)	9.7 (49.5)	12.4 (54.3)	14.5 (58.1)	14.2 (57.6)	12.2 (54.0)	8.8 (47.8)	5.4 (41.7)	2.8 (37.0)	8.3 (46.9)
Mean daily minimum °C (°F)	−0.3 (31.5)	−0.1 (31.8)	1.2 (34.2)	3.1 (37.6)	5.1 (41.2)	8.3 (46.9)	10.2 (50.4)	9.9 (49.8)	8.1 (46.6)	5.1 (41.2)	1.9 (35.4)	−0.5 (31.1)	4.3 (39.7)
Record low °C (°F)	−21.0 (−5.8)	−20.0 (−4.0)	−14.3 (6.3)	−7.2 (19.0)	−5.5 (22.1)	−2.5 (27.5)	−1.1 (30.0)	0.0 (32.0)	−4.0 (24.8)	−5.5 (22.1)	−12.5 (9.5)	−25.3 (−13.5)	−25.3 (−13.5)
Average precipitation mm (inches)	68.5 (2.70)	62.1 (2.44)	59.1 (2.33)	56.1 (2.21)	57.1 (2.25)	70.4 (2.77)	73.4 (2.89)	76.2 (3.00)	71.3 (2.81)	103.1 (4.06)	94.5 (3.72)	77.0 (3.03)	868.7 (34.20)
Average precipitation days (≥ 1.0 mm)	13.3	12.2	12.8	11.5	11.7	12.7	12.3	12.7	11.0	15.6	16.0	13.4	155.1
Mean monthly sunshine hours	48.8	72.2	113.5	151.6	211.5	156.5	148.8	155.2	114.4	92.7	63.9	42.5	1,371.6
Source 1: Met Office
Source 2: Starlings Roost Weather

== St Mary's Priory ==
Now demolished, the priory was a cell of Arbroath Abbey, its location marked by a cross, made in 1868 of Corrennie granite. The priory was founded by Reginald de Cheyne around 1285. Being a small foundation, the prior doubled as parish vicar, responsible to the Abbot of Arbroath, who in 1325 wrote to warn the prior about the behaviour of his young monks.

== Fyvie Castle ==
Fyvie Castle is reputed to have been built by King William the Lion in the early 13th century. It was the site of an open-air court held by King Robert the Bruce and home to the future King Charles I as a child.

== St Peter's Kirk ==
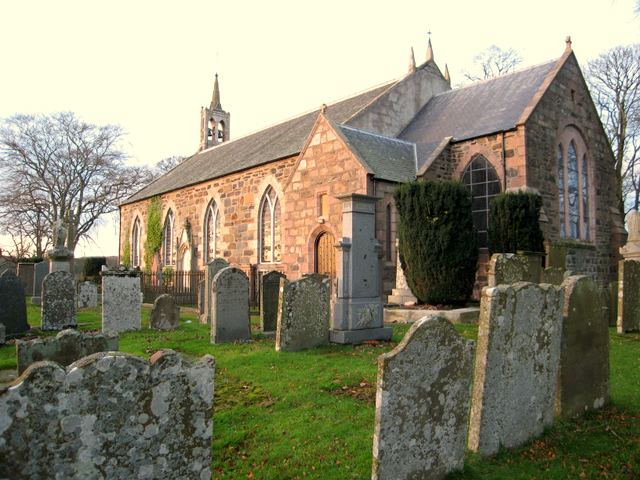
St Peter's Kirk

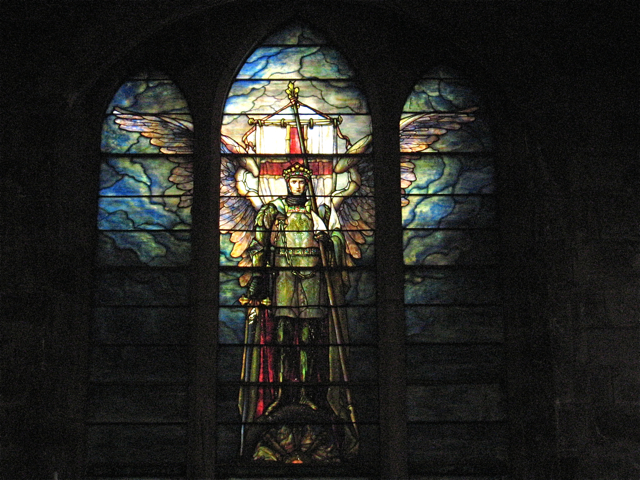
The east window, which depicts St George; Louis Comfort Tiffany

St Peter's Kirk was built in the early nineteenth century on the site of a medieval church. Built into the east gable are three Class I Pictish symbol stones and a Class III Pictish cross. The present church dates from 1808 (the chancel, 1902); however, the first St Peter's Church was referred to as early as 1178.

The church displays some Louis Comfort Tiffany stained glass windows, including one of St Michael. The east window commemorates Percy Forbes-Leith of Fyvie Castle, who died in the Second Boer War in 1900. Five carved stones have been built into the east gable, including part of a Celtic cross and the Rothiebrisbane Stone.

According to Charles McKean in 1990, there are also "good wood panels of 1603 and 1671. Curious 17th-century grave slabs and the Leith Hay Memorial, designed in 1901–02 by Alexander Marshall Mackenzie, in the graveyard. The nearby manse was built in 1830–31 in substantial squared stone and red dressings. The sundial is dated 1824.

== Folk tradition ==
The song The Bonnie Lass o' Fyvie tells of a captain of dragoons who dies for the love of a Fyvie girl. Additionally, the song Andrew Lammie tells of the doomed love of a local miller's daughter, Annie, for Lord Fyvie's trumpeter. Both of these songs may have historical basis - the young woman's grave is said to be in Fyvie churchyard. Child ballad 238, Glenlogie also refers to Fyvie in its final line.

One of the prophecies of Thomas the Rhymer relates to Fyvie, predicting it will never flourish until a particular three stones are found (a prophecy obviously pre-dating the church with its three Pictish runestones).

== Notable people ==
- Alastair Storey (born 1953), chairman and CEO of Westbury Street Holdings
- Cosmo Gordon Lang (1864–1945), Archbishop of Canterbury, was born in the village manse
- Alexander Skene (1837–1900), gynaecologist
- Fiona Muir-Harvey (born 1966), putative inspiration for the Baby Reindeer television series

== See also ==
- Fastern's Een
- Prior of Fyvie

== Bibliography ==
- McKean, Charles (1990), Banff & Buchan, Royal Incorporation of Architects in Scotland, ISBN 978-1-85158-231-0
