= John Alexander Third =

Scottish mathematician (1865–1948)

- Born: 6 May 1865; Aberdeen, Scotland
- Died: 11 August 1948 (aged 83); Edinburgh, Scotland
- Education: University of Aberdeen
- Scientific career
- Fields: Mathematics

John Alexander Third (6 May 1865 – 11 August 1948) was a Scottish mathematician.

== Life and work ==
Third, son of a stonemason, was educated at Robert Gordon's College before entering in 1885 in the University of Aberdeen where he graduated D.Sc in 1889, after spending some time studying in Jena, Germany. He was appointed rector of Campbeltown Grammar School and, five years later, in 1895, headmaster of Spier's School.

Third joined the Edinburgh Mathematical Society in 1897 and he was an enthusiastic member publishing papers in the Proceedings. He was also president of the society in 1902. He was director of education of Ayrshire from 1919 until his retirement in 1927.

After his death, his family made a bequest of £150 to found a prize in the Department of Mathematics of the university of Aberdeen.

== Bibliography ==
- Anonymous (1950). "John Alexander Third". Aberdeen University Review. 33: 81. ISSN 0001-320X.
- Rankin, R.A. (1983). "The first hundred years (1883–1983)". Proceedings of the Edinburgh Mathematical Society. 26 (2): 135–150. doi:10.1017/S0013091500016849. ISSN 0013-0915.
