= William Dickie Niven =

Scottish academic (1879–1965)

William Dickie Niven (26 April 1879 – 26 February 1965), of Fyvie, Aberdeenshire, was a Scottish academic.

== Family ==
Niven was the son of Charles Niven and Jane M. Mackay. In 1908, he married Isabella Cumming and they had two daughters.

== Education ==
He was educated at Fyvie Public School and Gordon's College, Aberdeen. Niven was educated at the University of Aberdeen, then at Berlin and Halle. He graduated with an MA from Aberdeen in 1900.

== Career ==
He was a church minister from 1907 to 1927. Niven was Professor of New Testament Language and Literature from 1935 to 1946. He was professor of Ecclesiastical History from 1946 until 1949, both at Trinity College, Glasgow. He was an army chaplain during World War I. He was awarded the Lumsden and Sachs Fellowship and the Croom Robertson Fellowship. He retired in 1949.

== Publications ==
- The conflicts of the early church
- John Knox and the Scottish Reformation
- Reformation principles after four centuries : the thirty-fifth series of Croall lectures
- The professor as preacher, sermons by Scottish theological professors
- Leaders of the ancient Church. V, Cyprian of Carthage
- National contributions to biblical science : XV. The contribution of Great Britain to church history. II
