= Fastern's Een =

Scottish traditional festival held on Shrove Tuesday

Fastern's E'en was a festival in Scotland, held on the Tuesday before Lent, otherwise known as Shrove Tuesday. Valuable foods like meat, butter and fat were used up in a feast and associated celebrations before the sacrifices of Lent.

Various alternative names were used in different districts, for example Bannock Nicht, Beef Brose and Shriften E'en. Some places held games of football or handball, for example Jedburgh held the Callant's Ba’ game between the "uppies" and the "Doonies".

There is a Fastern's E'en Cross at Fyvie in Aberdeenshire.
