= Moel Tryfan (locomotive) =

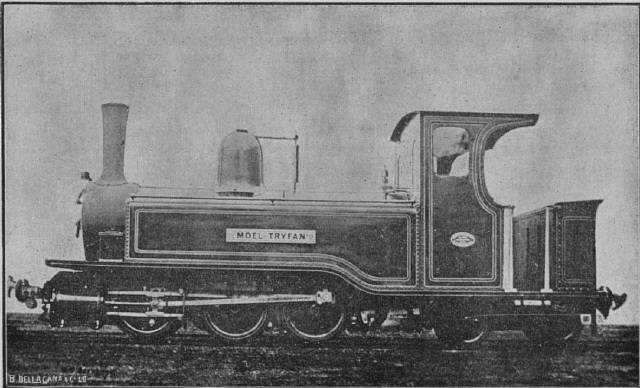
Moel Tryfan works photo

Moel Tryfan was a narrow gauge steam locomotive built for use on the North Wales Narrow Gauge Railways (NWNGRs) in 1874/5. The locomotive was an 0-6-4T single Fairlie locomotive built by the Vulcan Foundry near Manchester. It spent its entire working life on the NWNGRs and its successors the Welsh Highland Railway (WHR) and the Ffestiniog Railway (FfR).

== History ==
=== North Wales Narrow Gauge Railways ===
The North Wales Narrow Gauge Railways built two 1 ft 11 1/2 in (597 mm) gauge railways, connecting Dinas Junction, near Caernarfon, with Rhyd Ddu, and Bryngwyn. Two identical locomotives were ordered from the Vulcan Foundry to work the new railway. They were built to Fairlie's patent for articulated locomotives and were designed by George Percival Spooner, son of Charles Eaton Spooner, the manager of the nearby FfR.

The locomotives were the first 0-6-4Ts in the British Isles. They were named Moel Tryfan and Snowdon Ranger. Moel Tryfan was named after the local mountain where the slate quarries that provided most of the railway's commerce were located. The locomotives, built in 1874/5, entered service in 1877. In 1903, Moel Tryfan underwent a major overhaul (with new boiler and firebox) at Davies and Metcalfe in Manchester, a year after Snowdon Ranger. Despite these repairs, one of these two locomotives was dilapidated by 1908. On 19 March J C Russell, the Receiver and Manager, applied to the Chancery Court for authority to spend £1,300 to purchase a new locomotive (Gowrie delivered later that year). Russell's affidavit explained that it was "in place of one of the original locomotives which has been running since the Line was opened in August 1877. In spite of constant renewals and repairs one of the old Engines is quite worn out and the Engineer of the Company (Mr Aitchison) has informed me it is impossible to renew it except by rebuilding which is practically the same as acquiring a new Engine and that it would be less efficient, less powerful, and less economical in working than the proposed new Engine." Snowdon Ranger was photographed at Dinas on 23 June 1909 and new piston rings were ordered for the engine in September 1910 and Moel Tryfan in February 1911.

In February 1914, GC Aitchison (who had taken over as Receiver and Manager following Russell's death in 1912) swore an affidavit saying there were three engines, two of which (Moel Tryfan and Russell) had "collapsed", needing money spent on them. The third engine he referred to was presumably Gowrie, which implies that Snowdon Ranger had gone (or at least been taken out of service). It has been recorded that the best components of both locomotives were amalgamated into a single maintainable unit (although there is no evidence that a ten-year-old boiler was retained as a spare). The frames from Snowdon Ranger (which were renewed by Hunslet in 1908) are said to have been placed under the superstructure of Moel Tryfan, with the combined locomotive taking the latter name. This evidence suggests a date for the demise of Snowdon Ranger of around 1912 or 1913. However the hydraulic test of Moel Tryfan's boiler is recorded as being in 1917.

=== Welsh Highland Railway ===
Following the closure of the NWNGRs, Moel Tryfan was stored in the locomotive shed at Dinas along with Russell. Of the two, Moel Tryfan was in the poorer condition, so when services were resumed as the WHR in July 1922, Russell performed the majority of the work. On 11 November that year, Moel Tryfan was taken out of service, only to be used in emergencies. In order to operate the new railway efficiently, Moel Tryfan was sent to the Boston Lodge works of the neighbouring FfR for re-tubing in June 1923. It re-entered service but with the bogie frame cracking in September 1923, it was overhauled between January and April 1924 and was cut down in order to enable it to work on the Ffestiniog Railway, whose loading gauge was considerably smaller than the WHR's. This involved reducing the height of the locomotive's cab, funnel and dome. Between April and mid-May, 1925 boiler repairs were also undertaken and the locomotive then re-entered service and continued in use until 1935.

=== Ffestiniog Railway ===
In 1936 Moel Tryfan was dismantled at Boston Lodge for overhaul. The locomotive was stripped down to allow much needed repairs to its firebox and boiler. However repair work stopped in October 1936 and no further work was done on the locomotive. It was still in its dismantled state when the FfR closed in 1946.

The remains of Moel Tryfan survived long enough to become part of the fleet of the restored Ffestiniog Railway in the early 1950s. However, by this time it was little more than a rusting hulk, and on 2 October 1954 it was towed to Porthmadog Harbour Station where it was cut up for scrap. The proceeds from the sales of the remains were used to fund the further restoration of the Ffestiniog Railway. The trailing bogie survived and was ultimately used to provide pony trucks for the locomotives Linda and Blanche when they were converted from 0-4-0STs into 2-4-0ST+Ts along with the bogie frame, one side tank sheet and the air receiver.

== Bibliography ==
- Boyd, James I.C. (1988) [1972]. Narrow Gauge Railways in South Caernarvonshire – Volume 1. Headington: The Oakwood Press. ISBN 978-0-85361-365-7. OCLC 20417464.
- Boyd, James I.C. (1989) [1972]. Narrow Gauge Railways in South Caernarvonshire - Volume 2: The Welsh Highland Railway. Headington: The Oakwood Press. ISBN 978-0-85361-383-1. OCLC 145018679.
- Mitchell, Vic & Garraway, Allan (1996). Festiniog in the Fifties. Midhurst: Middleton Press. ISBN 978-1-873793-68-8.
- Mitchell, Vic; Smith, Keith; Gray, Adrian & Seymour, Michael (1993). Branch Lines Around Portmadoc: The Welsh Highland and Ffestiniog Railway 1923-46. Midhurst: Middleton Press. ISBN 978-1-873793-13-8.
- Bishop MJ (December 2009). "Unknown". Welsh Highland Heritage Group Journal (46).
- Whitehouse, P.B. (1969). Steam on the Shed. Shepperton: Ian Allan Publishing. ISBN 978-0-7110-0080-3.
- Jones, Chris; Dennis, Peter (2018). Little Giants: A History of the Ffestiniog Railway's Pre-Revival Locomotives, Their Mentors, Manufacture and Maintenance. Lydney: Lightmoor Press. ISBN 9-781911-038436.
