= South African Class B 0-6-4T =

1893 design of steam locomotive

NZASM 46 Tonner 0-6-4T IMR 46 Tonner 0-6-4T CSAR Class B 0-6-4T South African Class B 0-6-4T
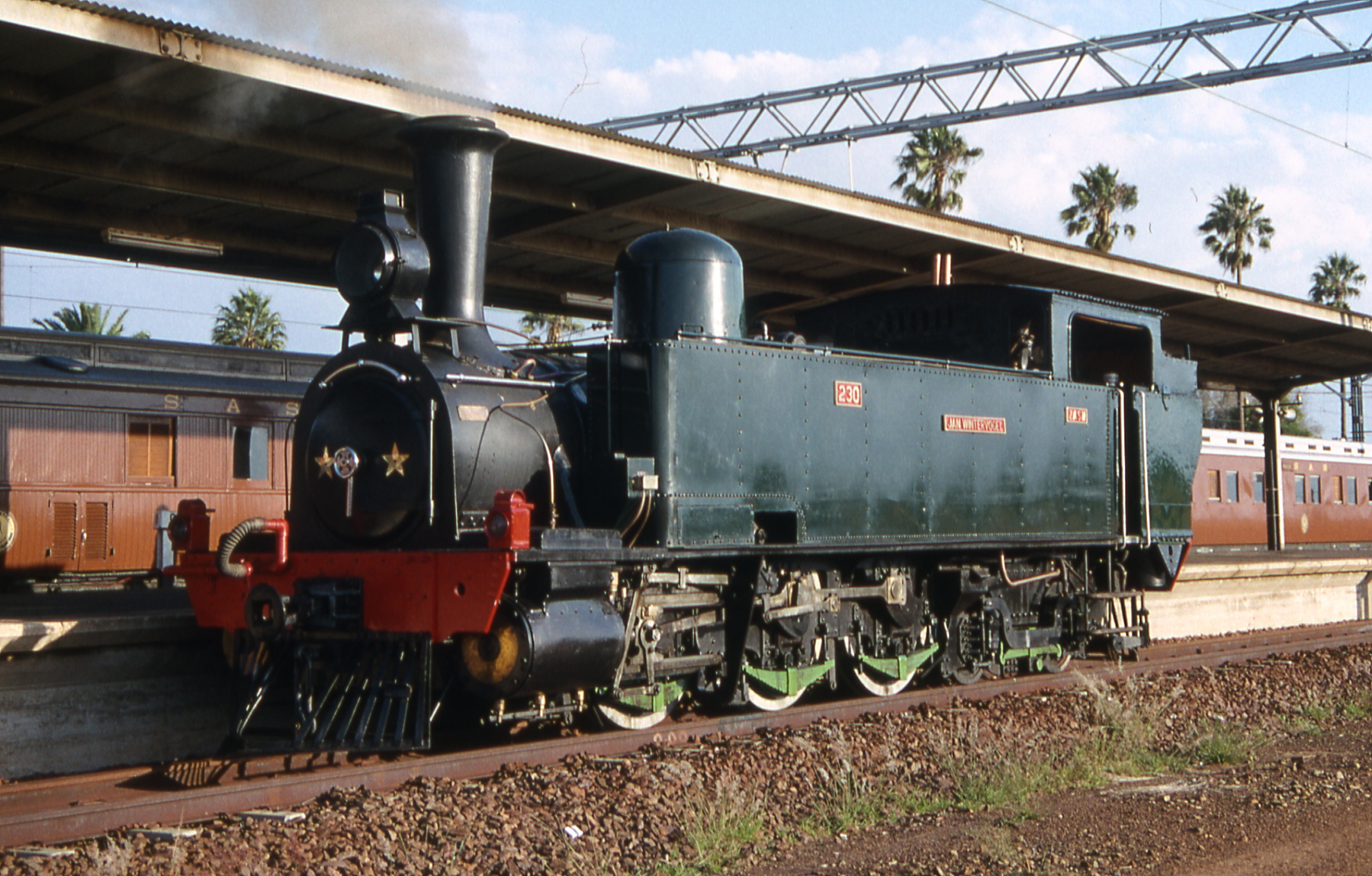
- NZASM 46 Tonner no. 230 Jan Wintervogel at Witbank, Transvaal, April 1993
Type and origin
- Power type: Steam
- Designer: Maschinenfabrik Esslingen
- Builder: 175 by Esslingen; 20 by Werkspoor
- Serial number: Esslingen: 2598–2617, 2624–2633, 2656–2665, 2703–2712, 2714–2733, 2745–2789, 2824–2843, 2854–2873, 2877–2886, 2941–2950; Werkspoor: 1–10, 29–38
- Model: NZASM 46 Tonner
- Build date: 1893–1899
- Total produced: 195
Specifications
- Configuration
  - Whyte: 0-6-4T
  - UIC: C2'n2t
- Driver: 2nd coupled axle
- Gauge: 3 ft 6 in (1,067 mm) Cape gauge
- Coupled dia.: 51 3/16 in (1,300 mm)
- Trailing dia.: 31 7/8 in (810 mm)
- Wheelbase: 19 ft 8 7/32 in (6,000 mm)
  - Axle spacing (Asymmetrical): 1–2: 5 ft 2 3/16 in (1,580 mm); 2–3: 4 ft 11 27/32 in (1,520 mm)
  - Coupled: 10 ft 2 1/32 in (3,100 mm)
  - Trailing: 5 ft 3 in (1,600 mm)
- Length
  - Over couplers: 34 ft 8 in (10,566 mm)
- Height: 12 ft 4 1/2 in (3,772 mm)
- Frame type: Plate
- Axle load: 10 LT 12 cwt (10,770 kg)
  - Coupled: 10 LT 12 cwt (10,770 kg)
  - Trailing: 13 LT 19 cwt 1 qtr (14,190 kg)
- Adhesive weight: 31 LT 16 cwt (32,310 kg)
- Loco weight: 45 LT 12 cwt (46,330 kg)
- Fuel type: Coal
- Fuel capacity: 4 LT (4.1 t)
- Water cap.: 1,503 imp gal (6,830 L)
- Firebox
  - Type: Round-top
  - Grate area: 15.6 sq ft (1.45 m^{2})
- Boiler
  - Pitch: 5 ft 9 1/2 in (1,765 mm)
  - Diameter: 3 ft 10 5/8 in (1,184 mm)
  - Tube plates: 12 ft 8 3/4 in (3,880 mm)
  - Small tubes: 144: 1 25/32 in (45 mm)
- Boiler pressure: 160 psi (1,103 kPa)
- Heating surface
  - Firebox: 91.2 sq ft (8.47 m^{2})
  - Tubes: 845 sq ft (78.5 m^{2})
  - Total surface: 936.2 sq ft (86.98 m^{2})
- Cylinders: Two
- Cylinder size: 16 15/16 in (430 mm) bore 24 13/16 in (630 mm) stroke
- Valve gear: Heusinger
- Valve type: Slide
- Couplers: Johnston link-and-pin
Performance figures
- Tractive effort: 16,580 lbf (73.8 kN) @ 75%
Career
- Operators: NZASM; Pretoria-Pietersburg Railway; CFM; Imperial Military Railways; Central South African Railways; South African Railways
- Class: NZASM 46 Tonner; CSAR & SAR Class B
- Number in class: NZASM 177, IMR 195, SAR 28
- Numbers: NZASM: 61–237; CFM: 20–49; IMR: 61–255; CSAR: 27-202; SAR: 1–2, 4–6, 8, 10–16, 18–22, 24–30, 33–43, 45–48, 50, 52, 54–55
- Delivered: 1893–1899
- First run: 1893
- Withdrawn: 1919

The South African Railways Class B 0-6-4T of 1893 was a steam locomotive from the pre-Union era in Transvaal.

Between 1893 and 1898, 175 Class B 0-6-4 tank engines were placed in service by the Nederlandsche-Zuid-Afrikaansche Spoorweg-Maatschappij in the Zuid-Afrikaansche Republiek.

In 1899, twenty more were ordered, of which only two were delivered by the time the Imperial Military Railways took over all railway operations in the two Boer Republics during the Second Boer War. The other eighteen locomotives in this order were intercepted by the Imperial Military Railways, who diverted two of them to Lourenço Marques.

At the end of the war, the survivors of these locomotives were taken onto the roster of the Central South African Railways, renumbered and designated Class B, while the two in Mozambique were taken onto the roster of the Caminhos de Ferro de Mocambique. In 1912, when the remaining locomotives were assimilated into the South African Railways, they were renumbered again, but retained their Class B designation.

== Forerunners ==
In 1891, the Nederlandsche-Zuid-Afrikaansche Spoorweg-Maatschappij (NZASM, often shortened to ZASM) of the Zuid-Afrikaansche Republiek (ZAR) placed an order with Emil Kessler's firm, the Maschinenfabrik Esslingen in Germany, for twenty 40 Tonner 0-6-2 tank steam locomotives. While these locomotives were satisfactory in service, the trailing wheels initially proved troublesome owing to insufficient sideways freedom of movement when traversing sharp curves.

== Manufacturers ==
To overcome this problem, the next order from the same manufacturer was for 0-6-4T locomotives which were practically identical to the 40 Tonners in their main dimensions, but with a four-wheeled trailing bogie. Because of the resultant increase in weight, these locomotives became known as the 46 Tonners.

The first twenty of these engines were delivered between 1893 and 1894 and numbered in the range from 61 to 80. They were followed by another 155 locomotives from the same manufacturer between 1894 and 1898, delivered in nine more batches and numbered in the range from 81 to 235.

In 1899, a further order for another twenty 46 Tonners was placed with the Nederlandse Fabriek van Werktuigen en Spoorwegmaterieel (Werkspoor) in the Netherlands. They were to have been numbered in the range from 236 to 255, following on the last of the Esslingen locomotives, but since delivery only commenced just before the outbreak of the Second Boer War, only numbers 236 and 237 actually entered service on the NZASM.

The remainder were intercepted by the Imperial Military Railways (IMR) who took over the operation of the Oranje-Vrijstaat Gouwerment-Spoorwegen (OVGS) and the NZASM on behalf of the invading British forces as possession was obtained of their railway lines. Sixteen of these engines were landed and erected at East London. The IMR diverted the other two to the Caminhos de Ferro de Mocambique (CFM) in Lourenço Marques.

== Characteristics ==
Like their predecessor 40 Tonners, the 46 Tonners had Heusinger valve gear, outside plate frames and used saturated steam. The original design of the 46 Tonner called for a straight-backed coal bunker, but the last sixteen Esslingen-built and the twenty Werkspoor-built locomotives had bunkers that sloped outwards towards the top at the back, which increased the coal capacity by 20%. Their water tanks were also enlarged to a 10% larger capacity.

In service, difficulty was experienced with the trailing bogie wheels fouling the firebox and the heads of stays and rivets. This was partially overcome by fitting stops to the engine frame, but this restriction of the sideways movement of the bogie wheels resulted in derailments in tight curves such as on diverging points. The engines performed well at relatively low speeds, but were prone to serious lateral oscillations at higher speeds. Cases of derailment on straight track at speed demonstrated the limitations of a design where there was no leading carrying wheel to stabilise the engine and considerable overhang of the cylinders.

== Service ==
=== NZASM ===
In NZASM service, all the Esslingen-built 46 Tonners were given names as well as engine numbers. The names are listed in Table 1.

The 46 Tonners became the standard mainline locomotives of the NZASM and were used on all kinds of traffic between Pretoria in the ZAR and Lourenço Marques in Mozambique. Since they did not have a leading bogie, they were found to be rough-riding and it became the practice to run them bunker forward whenever possible. The trailing bogie had a steadying effect on the locomotive when leading and the crew was not shaken up as much.

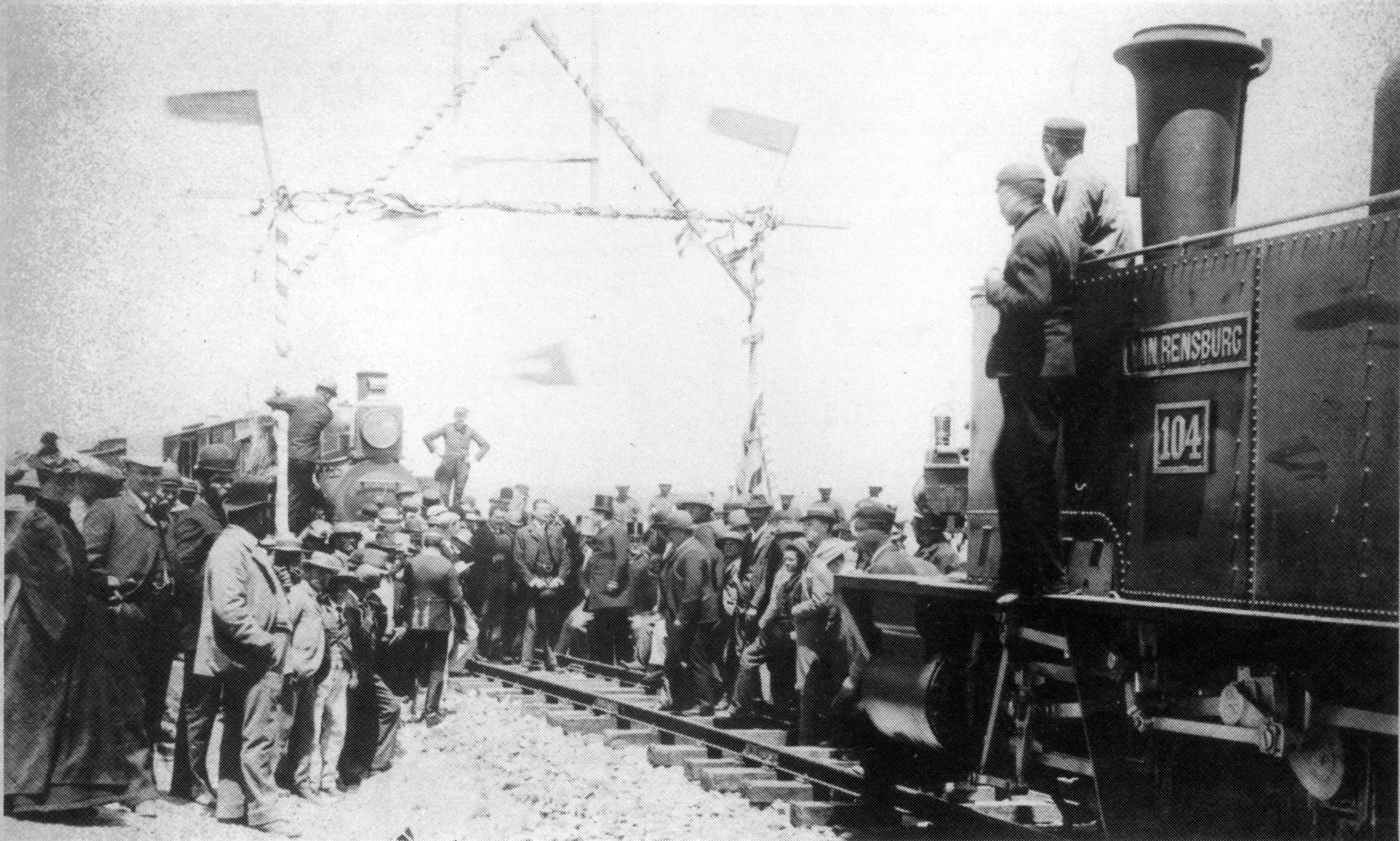
No. 104 Van Rensburg at the last bolt ceremony at Heidelberg, Transvaal, 10 October 1895

On 10 October 1895, on ZAR President Paul Kruger's birthday, 46 Tonner no. 104 Van Rensburg hauled the NZASM train to the last bolt ceremony at Heidelberg, Transvaal, where the Transvaal and Natal mainlines were linked up.

=== Pretoria-Pietersburg Railway ===
One of the locomotives, no. 64 Prinsloo, was leased or sold to the Pretoria-Pietersburg Railway (PPR) c. 1897. It retained both the NZASM number and name on the PPR.

=== Caminhos de Ferro de Moçambique ===
Between 1897 and 1898, some of the NZASM 46 Tonner locomotives were sold to the CFM. The CFM eventually had at least thirty 46 Tonners in service. The two locomotives which were delivered after the outbreak of the war and which were diverted to Lourenço Marques upon arrival, IMR numbers 249 and 250, were also taken onto the CFM roster at the end of the war. Between 1907 and 1920, during the Central South African Railways (CSAR) and South African Railways (SAR) eras, six more 46 Tonners were sold to the CFM.

=== Imperial Military Railways ===
All the NZASM 46 Tonners, as well as sixteen of the eighteen locomotives which were not delivered to the NZASM as a result of the outbreak of the war, were taken onto the roster of the IMR when it took over all railway operations in the ZAR during the war. It would appear that the locomotives were not renumbered in IMR service.

=== Central South African Railways ===
Hostilities ceased on 1 June 1902. On 1 July 1902, when the IMR was transferred to civilian control, the survivors of the NZASM 46 Tonners were taken onto the CSAR roster. They were designated Class B and renumbered by the CSAR, but records of the renumbering details are scant. The available information on NZASM-to-CSAR renumbering only covers those locomotives which the CSAR had sold to the CFM between 1907 and 1910, as shown in Table 1 and included in Table 2.

Several alterations were made to the locomotives by the IMR and CSAR. The original crank webs had solid crank-pin collars. New crank webs were fitted, which enabled solid bushed connecting and coupling rods to be fitted in place of the original split brass type. The original unbalanced slide valves were replaced with balanced slide valves.

The builders, works numbers, names, original engine numbers and known renumbering onto the rosters of the CFM, CSAR and SAR are listed in the table. The known CFM engine numbers are in the range from 20 to 49, but since the CFM locomotives were probably allocated CFM numbers in the order in which they were acquired, most of the actual CFM engine numbers are not known with the exception of NZASM no. 229 Simon Turver which definitely became CFM no. 26.

46 Tonner 0-6-4T builders, works numbers, years in service, names and IMR, CSAR and SAR renumbering
Builder	Works no.	Year Built	Name	NZASM no.	IMR no.	CSAR no.	SAR no.	Disposal
Esslingen	2598	1894	Roos	61	61	61		
Esslingen	2599	1894	Botha	62	62	62		Scrapped 1909
Esslingen	2600	1894	Cronje	63	63	63		Withdrawn pre-1907
Esslingen	2601	1894	Prinsloo	64	64	64		Scrapped 1909
Esslingen	2602	1894	Malan	65	65	65		
Esslingen	2603	1894	Stoop	66	66	66		
Esslingen	2604	1894	Greyling	67	67	67		
Esslingen	2605	1894	Grobler	68	68	68		Scrapped 1909
Esslingen	2606	1894	Van Staden	69	69	69		
Esslingen	2607	1895	Beukes	70	70 (Note: The Beukes is most likely to have become CSAR no. 70.)	70		Scrapped 1909
Esslingen	2608	1894	Meyer	71	71	71		Scrapped 1909
Esslingen	2609	1894	Steenkamp	72	72	72		Scrapped 1909
Esslingen	2610	1894	De la Rey	73	73	73		
Esslingen	2611	1894	Du Plessis de Bec	74	74	74		
Esslingen	2612	1894	Celliers	75	75			CFM 1897
Esslingen	2613	1894	De Clercq	76	76	76		Scrapped 1909
Esslingen	2614	1894	Bezuidenhout	77	77	77		Withdrawn pre-1907
Esslingen	2615	1894	Spies	78	78	78		
Esslingen	2616	1894	Labuschagne	79	79	79		
Esslingen	2617	1894	De Jager	80	80	80	1	
Esslingen	2624	1894	Regborn Smitt	81	81	81		
Esslingen	2625	1894	Machado	82	82			CFM 1897
Esslingen	2626	1894	Verloop	83	83	83		Withdrawn pre-1907
Esslingen	2627	1894	Kock	84	84	84		
Esslingen	2628	1894	Malherbe	85	85	85		
Esslingen	2629	1894	Van Niekerk	86	86	86		
Esslingen	2630	1894	Erasmus	87	87	87		
Esslingen	2631	1894	De Wet	88	88	88		
Esslingen	2632	1894	Boshoff	89	89	89		Withdrawn pre-1907
Esslingen	2633	1895	Le Roux	90	90	90		Scrapped 1909
Esslingen	2656	1895	Holland	91	91	91		
Esslingen	2657	1895	Portugal	92	92	92		Scrapped 1909
Esslingen	2658	1895	Schutte	93	93			CFM 1897
Esslingen	2659	1895	Fourie	94	94	94		Scrapped 1909
Esslingen	2660	1895	Otto	95	95	95		Scrapped 1909
Esslingen	2661	1895	Tosen	96	96	96		Scrapped 1909
Esslingen	2662	1895	Jooste	97	97	97		
Esslingen	2663	1895	Uys	98	98	98		Scrapped 1909
Esslingen	2664	1895	Komaas	99	99 (Note: The original boilers became SAR stationary boilers, found listed in an SAR boiler register. In the case of the Komaas it suggests that the locomotive was returned from CFM.)			CFM 1897
Esslingen	2665	1895	Kirsten	100	100	100		
Esslingen	2703	1895	Bodenstein	101	101	101		
Esslingen	2704	1895	Kotze	102	102	102		Scrapped 1909
Esslingen	2705	1895	Birkenstock	103	103	103		
Esslingen	2706	1895	Van Rensburg	104	104	104		Withdrawn pre-1907
Esslingen	2707	1895	Schoeman	105	105	105		Scrapped 1909
Esslingen	2708	1895	Van der Stel	106	106	106		Sold 1909-09
Esslingen	2709	1895	De Graaff	107	107	107		Scrapped 1909
Esslingen	2710	1895	Petersen	108	108	108		
Esslingen	2711	1895	Oranje Vrystaat	109	109	109		
Esslingen	2712	1895	Koningin Wilhelmina	110	110	110		Scrapped 1909
Esslingen	2714	1895	Koningin Emma	111	111	111		
Esslingen	2715	1895	Zacharias Wagenbouw	112	112	112		
Esslingen	2716	1895	Van Quarlberg	113	113			CFM 1897
Esslingen	2717	1895	Jacob Bronkhorst	114	114	114		
Esslingen	2718	1895	Pieter Hackins	115	115	115		Scrapped 1909
Esslingen	2719	1895	Isbrand Grosse	116	116	116		
Esslingen	2720	1895	Johann Bax	117	117	117		Withdrawn pre-1907
Esslingen	2721	1896	J.C. d'Ableing	118	118	118		Scrapped 1909
Esslingen	2722	1896	Van Assenburgh	119	119	119		
Esslingen	2723	1896	Willem Hellot	120	120	120		Withdrawn pre-1907
Esslingen	2724	1896	Pasques de Chavonnes	121	121	121		Scrapped 1908
Esslingen	2725	1896	De la Fontaine	122	122	122	2	
Esslingen	2726	1896	P.G. Noodt	123	123	123	3	
Esslingen	2727	1896	A. van Kervel	124	124	124		
Esslingen	2728	1896	D. van der Heughel	125	125	125		
Esslingen	2729	1896	H. Swellengrebel	126	126	126	4	
Esslingen	2730	1896	Ryk Tulbach	127	127	127		
Esslingen	2731	1896	J. van Plettenberg	128	128	128		
Esslingen	2732	1896	C.J. van Graaf	129	129	129		
Esslingen	2733	1896	J.W. Janssens	130	130	130		
Esslingen	2745	1896	Argus	131	131	131		
Esslingen	2746	1896	Brutus	132	132	132		
Esslingen	2747	1896	Ceres	133	133	133		
Esslingen	2748	1896	Diana	134	134	134		
Esslingen	2749	1896	Etna	135	135	135		
Esslingen	2750	1896	Flora	136	136	136		
Esslingen	2751	1896	Glorie	137	137	137	5	
Esslingen	2752	1896	Hecla	138	138	138		Scrapped 1909
Esslingen	2753	1896	Juno	139	139 (Note: The Juno was sold around 1897 to Cornelia Colliery.)			Sold 1897
Esslingen	2754	1896	Komet	140	140	140		
Esslingen	2755	1896	Leda	141	141	141		Withdrawn pre-1907
Esslingen	2756	1896	Mars	142	142	142		Scrapped 1909
Esslingen	2757	1896	Nero	143	143	143		Scrapped 1909
Esslingen	2758	1896	Orion	144	144	144		Scrapped 1909
Esslingen	2759	1896	Pluto	145	145	145		Scrapped 1909
Esslingen	2760	1896	Rhea	146	146	146		
Esslingen	2761	1896	Sirius	147	147	147		CFM 1905
Esslingen	2762	1896	Triton	148	148	148		
Esslingen	2763	1896	Urania	149	149	149	27	
Esslingen	2764	1896	Vesta	150	150	150		
Esslingen	2765	1896	Castor	151	151	151	28	
Esslingen	2766	1896	Pollux	152	152	152		Scrapped 1909
Esslingen	2767	1896	Ajax	153	153	153		Scrapped 1909
Esslingen	2768	1896	Bellona	154	154	154		
Esslingen	2769	1896	Cyclops	155	155	155		
Esslingen	2770	1896	Delios	156	156	156		Sold 1909-09
Esslingen	2771	1896	Eris	157	157	157	6	
Esslingen	2772	1896	Faunus	158	158	158		Scrapped 1909
Esslingen	2773	1896	Glaucus	159	159	159	7	
Esslingen	2774	1896	Hector	160	160	160	8	
Esslingen	2775	1896	Irene	161	161	161		CFM 1905
Esslingen	2776	1896	Jason	162	162	162		Sold 1909-09
Esslingen	2777	1896	Kratos	163	163	163		
Esslingen	2778	1896	Lucifer	164	164	164	9	
Esslingen	2779	1896	Medusa	165	165	165		
Esslingen	2780	1896	Neptunus	166	166	166		
Esslingen	2781	1896	Orrestus	167	167	167		Scrapped 1909
Esslingen	2782	1896	Pallus	168	168	168		
Esslingen	2783	1896	Rhesus	169	169	169		Scrapped 1909
Esslingen	2784	1896	Styx	170	170 (Note: The Styx was sold in December 1905 to Transvaal Consolidated Coal in Belfast.)	170		Sold 1905-12
Esslingen	2785	1896	Thetis	171	171	171	10	
Esslingen	2786	1896	Ulysses	172	172	172		Scrapped 1909
Esslingen	2787	1896	Volcanus	173	173	173		
Esslingen	2788	1896	Wodan	174	174	174	11	
Esslingen	2789	1896	Xenios	175	175	175		
Esslingen	2824	1896	Vondel	176	176	176	12	
Esslingen	2825	1897	Willem de Zogger	177	177	177	29	
Esslingen	2826	1897	Egmond	178	178	178		
Esslingen	2827	1897	Hoorne	179	179	179	30	
Esslingen	2828	1897	Brederode	180	180	180	31	
Esslingen	2829	1897	Julius Caesar	181	181			CFM 1897
Esslingen	2830	1897	Claudius Civilis	182	182	182	33	
Esslingen	2831	1897	Stephenson	183	183	183	34	
Esslingen	2832	1897	James Watt	184	184			CFM 1897
Esslingen	2833	1897	Boerhaare	185	185	185	36	
Esslingen	2834	1897	Pasteur	186	186	186		
Esslingen	2835	1897	Rembrandt	187	187			CFM 1897
Esslingen	2836	1897	Jan Steen	188	188	188	37	
Esslingen	2837	1897	Rubens	189	189	189		
Esslingen	2838	1897	Tromp	190	190	190	38	
Esslingen	2839	1897	De Ruyter	191	191	191		
Esslingen	2840	1897	Van Brakel	192	192	192	39	
Esslingen	2841	1897	Jan Pieterszkoen	193	193	193		Scrapped 1909
Esslingen	2842	1897	Van Gaalen	194	194	194		Sold 1909-04
Esslingen	2843	1897	Evensen	195	195 (Note: The Evensen was reportedly returned to South Africa for industrial service at Randfontein Estates Gold Mine.)			CFM 1897
Esslingen	2854	1897	Eendracht	196	196	196	40	
Esslingen	2855	1897	Kracht	197	197	197	41	
Esslingen	2856	1897	Veiligheid	198	198	198	42	
Esslingen	2857	1897	Wysheid	199	199	40	13	
Esslingen	2858	1897	Wetenschap	200	200 (Note: The Wetenschap most likely became CSAR no. 195, but it could also have been the unnamed IMR no. 246.)	195		
Esslingen	2859	1897	Welvaart	201	201	187		CFM 1905
Esslingen	2860	1897	Postwezen	202	202	184	35	
Esslingen	2861	1897	Telegrafie	203	203	181	32	
Esslingen	2862	1897	Onderwys	204	204	139	26	
Esslingen	2863	1897	Nyverheid	205	205 (Note: In one source, IMR no. 205 and 206 are given as CSAR no. 113 and 99 respectively, both of which went to CFM in 1905. The renumbering is uncertain, however, since IMR no. 205 and 206 could also have become CSAR 104, 117 or 120, all of which were withdrawn from CSAR service prior to 1907 and therefore did not appear in the CSAR Rolling Stock Register of 1907.)	113		CFM 1905
Esslingen	2864	1897	Landbouw	206	206	99		CFM 1905
Esslingen	2865	1897	Veeteelt	207	207	93	25	
Esslingen	2866	1897	Mynwezen	208	208	82	24	
Esslingen	2867	1897	Europa	209	209	75	23	
Esslingen	2868	1897	Azie	210	210 (Note: The sequence in which IMR no. 210 and 211 were renumbered is unconfirmed, but CSAR no. 60 and 59 respectively appear the most logical, given the known renumbering sequence.)	60		
Esslingen	2869	1897	Amerika	211	211	59		CFM 1897 or 1905
Esslingen	2870	1897	Afrika	212	212	58	22	
Esslingen	2871	1897	Australien	213	213 (Note: The Australien is most likely to have become CSAR no. 57.)	57		Withdrawn pre-1907
Esslingen	2872	1897	President Reitz	214	214	56	21	
Esslingen	2873	1897	President Steyn	215	215	55	20	
Esslingen	2877	1897	Beelaerts van Blockland	216	216	54	19	
Esslingen	2878	1897	Cornelis Hontmann	217	217	53	18	
Esslingen	2879	1897	Paulus van Caerden	218	218	52	17	
Esslingen	2880	1897	Joris van Spilbergen	219	219	51	16	
Esslingen	2881	1897	Pieter Both	220	220 (Note: The Pieter Both is believed to have been sold around 1905, possibly to CFM, and was subsequently returned to South Africa for industrial service at Victoria Falls & Transvaal Power, later part of ESKOM.)	50		CFM 1905
Esslingen	2882	1897	Isac le Maire	221	221	49		
Esslingen	2883	1897	Leendert Jansz	222	222 (Note: The Leendert Jansz was sold in July 1909 to Premier Coal Company.)	48		Sold 1909-07
Esslingen	2884	1897	Nicolaus Proot	223	223 (Note: The Nicolaus Proot is believed to never have been delivered to the NZASM and diverted new to Vereeniging Estates in 1898.)			Diverted 1898
Esslingen	2885	1897	David Cominck	224	224	47	15	
Esslingen	2886	1897	Hendrik Boom	225	225	46	14	
Esslingen	2941	1897	Annetjie Boom	226	226			CFM 1897
Esslingen	2942	1897	Sebastiaan van Opdorp	227	227			CFM 1897
Esslingen	2943	1897	Elisabeth van Opdorp	228	228			CFM 1897
Esslingen	2944	1898	Simon Turver	229	229			CFM 1897 (No. 26)
Esslingen	2945	1898	Jan Wintervogel	230	230 (Note: IMR no. 230 and 231 most likely became CSAR no. 45 and 44 respectively, or possibly vice versa due to some inconsistency between different SAR sources. CSAR no. 45 and 44 appear the most logical, given the known renumbering sequence.)	45	44	Or ex IMR 231
Esslingen	2946	1898	Stephen Botma	231	231	44		Or ex IMR 230
Esslingen	2947	1898	Jan van Harvarden	232	232	43		
Esslingen	2948	1898	Wouter Mostert	233	233	42	43	
Esslingen	2949	1898	Rijklof van Goens	234	234 (Note: The Rijklof van Goens is most likely to have become CSAR no. 41.)	41		Withdrawn pre-1907
Esslingen	2950	1898	Roelof de Man	235	235 (Note: The Roelof de Man is believed to never have been delivered to the NZASM and diverted new to SA Exploration in 1898. It later became an AECI locomotive.)			Diverted 1898
Werkspoor	1	1899		236	236	39	47	
Werkspoor	2	1899		237	237	38	46	
Werkspoor	3	1899			238	37		
Werkspoor	4	1899			239	36	45	
Werkspoor	5	1901			240	35	55	
Werkspoor	6	1901			241	34	54	
Werkspoor	7	1901			242	33	53	
Werkspoor	8	1901			243	31	52	
Werkspoor	9	1901			244	30	51	
Werkspoor	10	1901			245	29	50	
Werkspoor	29	1901			246 (Note: IMR no. 234 is most likely to have become CSAR no. 32, but it could also have been the Wetenschap, NZASM and IMR no. 200.)	32		Withdrawn pre-1907
Werkspoor	30	1901			247	28	49	
Werkspoor	31	1901			248	27	48	
Werkspoor	32	1901			249			
Werkspoor	33	1901			250			
Werkspoor	34	1901			251			
Werkspoor	35	1901			252			
Werkspoor	36	1901			253			
Werkspoor	37	1901			254			
Werkspoor	38	1901			255			

=== South African Railways ===
When the Union of South Africa was established on 31 May 1910, the three Colonial government railways (Cape Government Railways, Natal Government Railways and CSAR) were united under a single administration to control and administer the railways, ports and harbours of the Union. Although the South African Railways and Harbours came into existence in 1910, the actual classification and renumbering of all the rolling stock of the three constituent railways were only implemented with effect from 1 January 1912.

As a result of locomotive sales by the NZASM to the CFM before the war, wartime attrition and more sales by the CSAR to the CFM after the war, only 55 of the original 175 46 Tonner locomotives remained to be taken onto the SAR roster by 1910. They retained their Class B designation and their planned SAR number range was to be from 1 to 55. From the several gaps in the actual number sequence, it would appear that eleven of these locomotives were withdrawn or disposed of between 1910 and 1912. As a result, by the time the actual renumbering took place in 1912, only 44 of the locomotives remained to be taken onto the SAR roster.

In SAR service, the Class B was used as shunting engines in the Transvaal and the Orange Free State, and towards the end of their service lives also in the Western Cape. The last 46 Tonner was withdrawn from SAR service and scrapped during 1919, but several had earlier been sold to gold mining companies.

=== Industrial ===
Several Class B locomotives were sold to mines and other industries by the CFM, CSAR and SAR when they began to be withdrawn from government railways service. Some remained in industrial service well into the twentieth century. At least one, identified as ex NZASM no. 195 Evensen, later CFM no. 27, was purchased by the Randfontein Estates Gold Mine (REGM). Another saw service with Dunn's Locomotive Works in Witbank.

== Preservation ==
Four of the 46 Tonner locomotives are known to have survived.

- Esslingen-built SAR no. 19, NZASM no. 216 Beelaerts van Blockland, is at the James Hall Museum at Wemmer Pan in Johannesburg, restored as Consolidated Main Reef Mines & Estates no. 4.
- Esslingen-built SAR no. 41, NZASM no. 197 Kracht, is on display at the Outeniqua Transport Museum in George, restored incorrectly as NZASM no. 61 Roos and bearing the name President Kruger, which was the name carried by 40 Tonner no. 42 in the NZASM days.
- Esslingen-built SAR no. 44, NZASM no. 230 Jan Wintervogel, was donated by ESKOM to the SAR for preservation in 1971 and was steamed occasionally in the Spoornet era for steam enthusiasts' specials, filming and other activities.
- Werkspoor-built SAR no. 47, unnamed NZASM no. 236, was plinthed on the concourse at Pretoria station, restored incorrectly as NZASM no. 242.

== Illustration ==
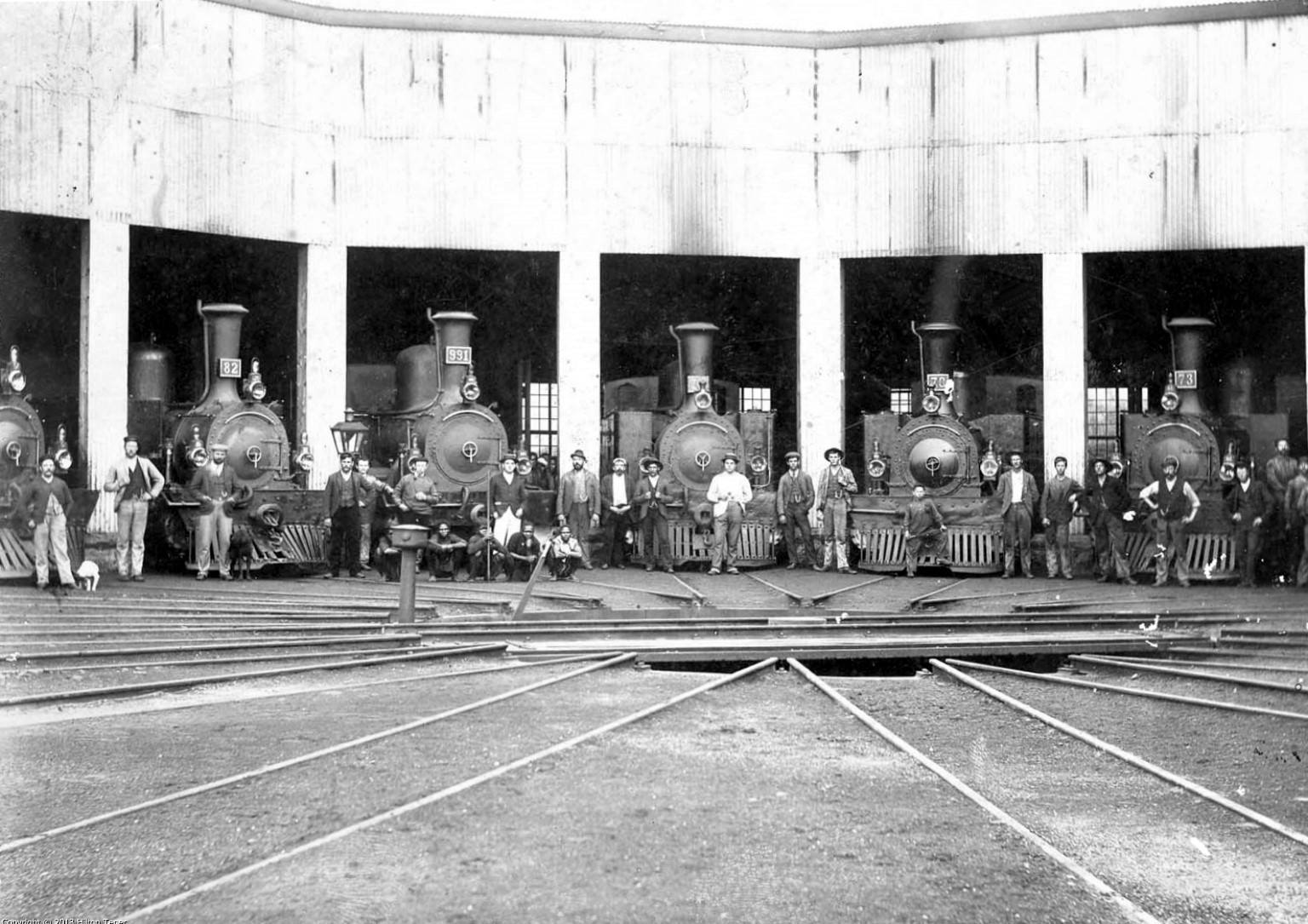
Five 46 Tonner locomotives and 32 Tonner no. 991 in the Waterval-Boven roundhouse, c. 1895

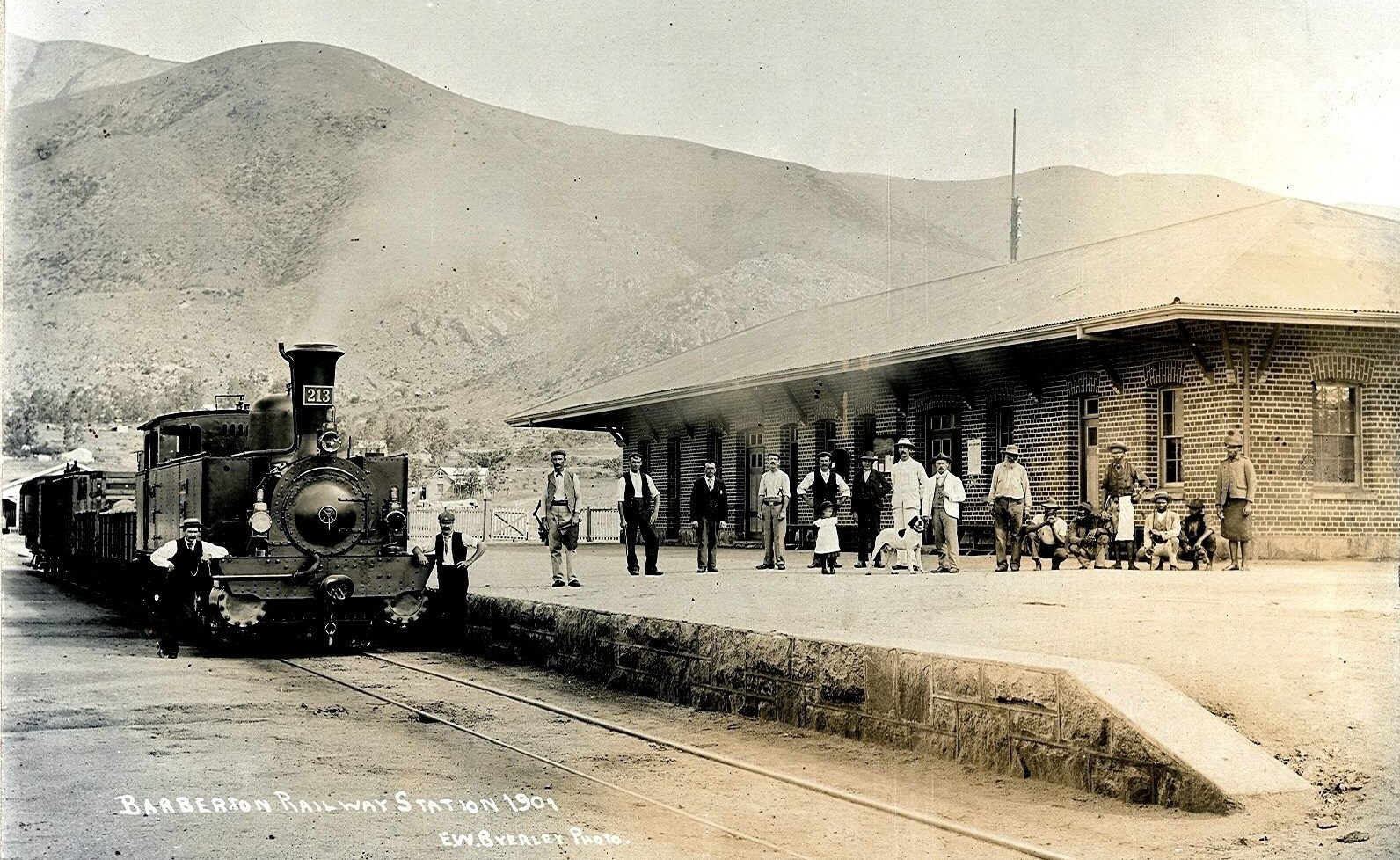
Esslingen-built no. 213, the engine Australien, at Barberton station in 1901

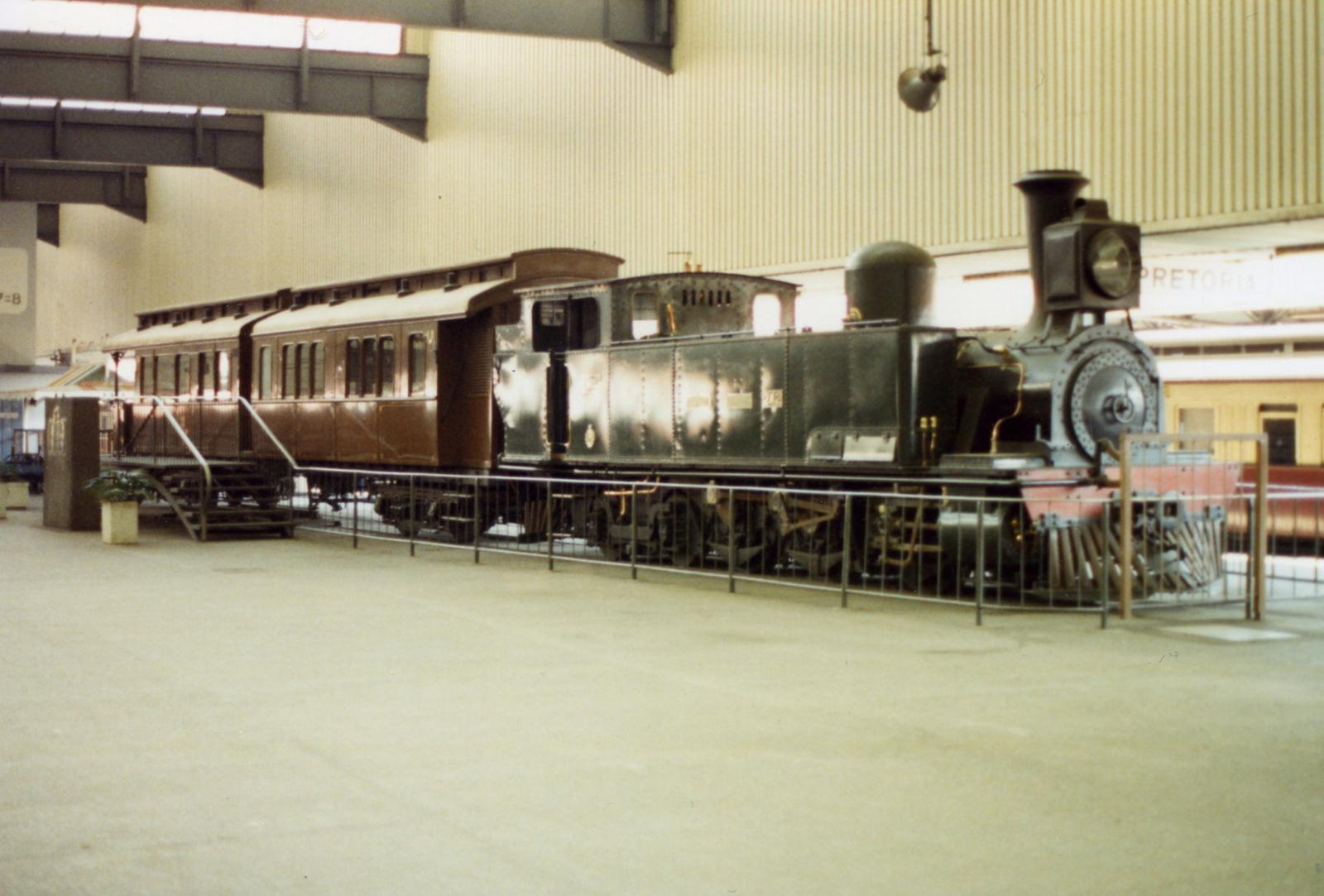
Werkspoor-built SAR no. 47, unnamed NZASM no. 236, plinthed at Pretoria station, 8 October 1989

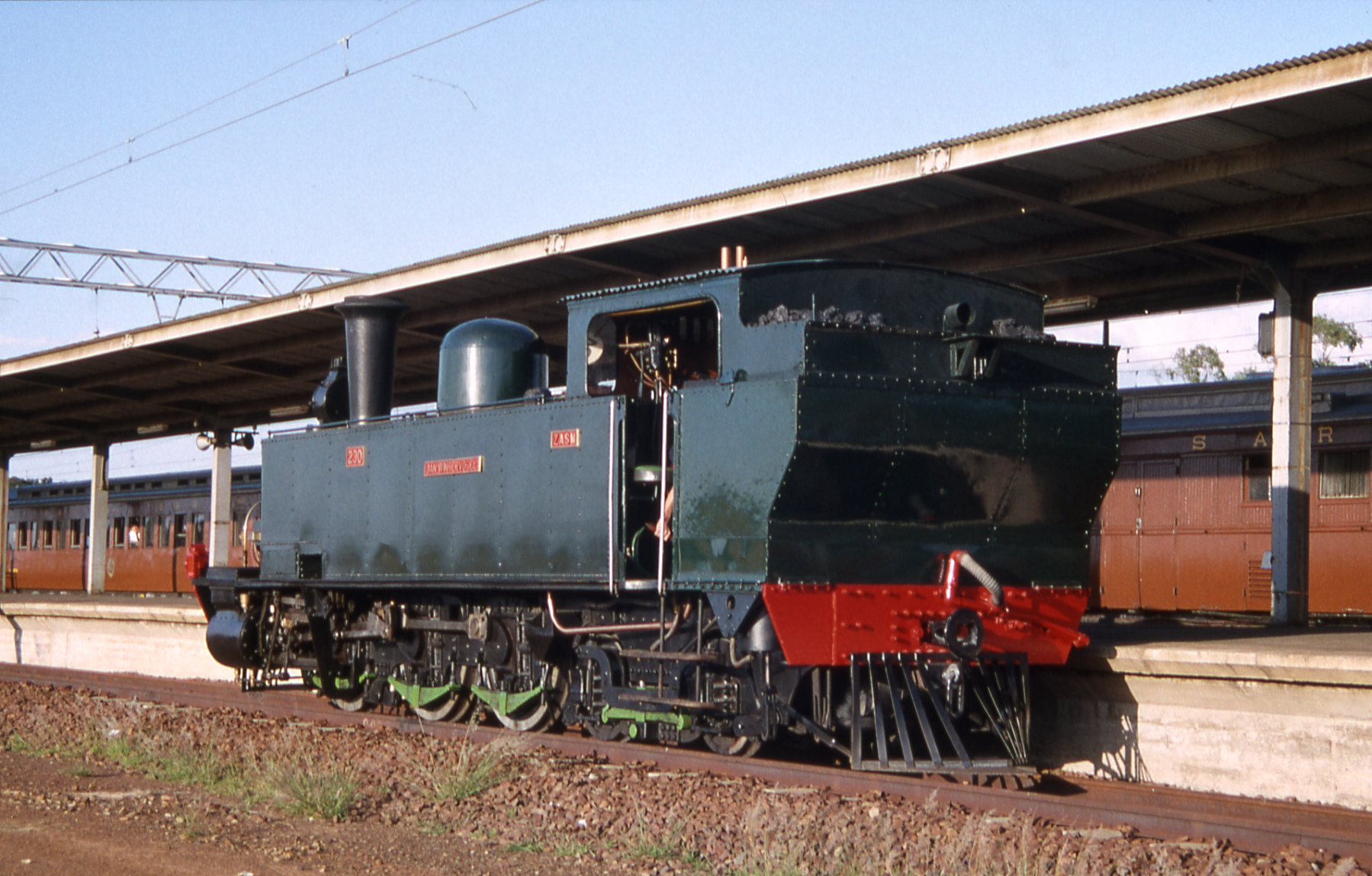
Rear view of Esslingen-built NZASM 46 Tonner no. 230 Jan Wintervogel, in steam at Witbank, April 1993
