= Benugo =

British catering company

- Trade name: Benugo
- Industry: Restaurants, cafes
- Founded: 1998
- Founder: Ben Warner
- Headquarters: London, England
- Owner: WSH Group
- Website: benugo.com

Benugo (benúːgoʊ) is a British catering company. It operates high street cafes, restaurants, dining spaces inside public buildings as well as in-house corporate cafes. As of March 2014, Benugo had more than 70 individual locations; most of these are in London, with some locations outside including Bath, Oxford, Coventry, Edinburgh and Stirling.

== History ==
Benugo was founded in 1998 by brothers Ben Warner and Hugo Warner in Clerkenwell, London.

Benugo signed its first public space contract at the Victoria & Albert Museum in 2004, and opened a restaurant, Benugo bar and kitchen, in the British Film Institute building in 2007. Further cultural sites with Benugo Bar and Kitchens include Warwick Arts Centre, in Coventry.

In 2008 the investment company WSH bought an interest in Benugo.

By 2014, the chain had about 2,000 employees.

== High street ==
In 2014, Benugo operates 11 high street shops throughout London, including Clerkenwell, Curzon Street, Hanover Street, Luton Airport, Covent Garden, Great Portland Street, Cannon Street, St Pancras, Waterloo Station, Wigmore Street and Victoria.

Benugo specialises in freshly made sandwiches, salads and coffee. The company was presented with a London Lifestyle Award in 2011 as London's Coffee Shop of the Year. and 2013.

== Public spaces ==
In addition to the high street business, Benugo also runs the cafes and restaurants in a number of public spaces, including the Victoria and Albert Museum. The company provides catering facilities in the Natural History Museum, The Science Museum, and most recently The British Museum and Wellcome Collection in 2012 and 2013 respectively. In 2013, Benugo began planning a bar and café at the English National Opera. As of 2015, this development is not yet complete.

Benugo also operates restaurants in or next to other cultural and public spaces including at the Museum of London, the Bishopsgate Institute, in Hyde Park, at Westminster Abbey, at National Museums Scotland and in Lincoln's Inn Fields.
