= Prior of Fyvie =

The Prior of Fyvie (later Commendator of Fyvie) was the head of the medieval Tironensian monastic community of Fyvie Priory, located in modern Aberdeenshire, Scotland. The following is a list of priors and commendators:

== List of priors ==
- ?
- Neso, 1312
- ?
- Albertinus, 1323–1325
- ?
- John Fewir, 1362
- Patrick de Infirmiterio, 1362–1364
- ?
- John Geby, 1371–1384
- ?
- John Scot, 1395
- ?
- John de St Andreas, 1425–1450
- Malcolm Brydy, 1450-1455 x 1456
- Alexander Mason, 1459–1508
- Robert Cuby, 1461
- George Hepburn, 1507–1513

== List of commendators ==
- Thomas Nudry, 1516
- ?
- Thomas Currour, 1529–1531
- David Betoun, 1531
- ?

== See also ==
- Fyvie Priory

== Bibliography ==
- Watt, D. E. R. & Shead, N. F. (eds.), The Heads of Religious Houses in Scotland from the 12th to the 16th Centuries, The Scottish Records Society, New Series, Volume 24, (Edinburgh, 2001), pp. 85–6
