= Edward Dyne Fenton =

British author and amateur photographer

Edward Dyne Fenton (12 December 1827 – 29 July 1880) was a British writer and amateur photographer.

== Biography ==
Fenton was born in Wakefield, Yorkshire. He entered the British Army as an ensign in the 53rd (Shropshire) Regiment of Foot in 1847, was advanced to a lieutenancy in 1849, placed on the half-pay list in 1857, obtained a captaincy in the 14th Buckinghamshire regiment of foot in 1858, and exchanged into the 86th (Royal County Down) Regiment of Foot in 1860, with which he spent some years at Gibraltar. He retired from the army about 1870, and thenceforward resided chiefly at Scarborough where he died in 1880.

== Writings ==
- Sorties from Gib. in quest of Sensation and Sentiment (1872), a collection of entertaining narratives of tours made in Spain during brief furloughs.
- Military Men I have met (1872), humorous sketches, illustrated by Linley Sambourne, of types of military character.
- Eve's Daughters (1873), a volume of slight sketches and stories illustrating female character. * B., an Autobiography (1874), a three-volume novel.
