= Allen Daley =

British public health official (1887–1969)

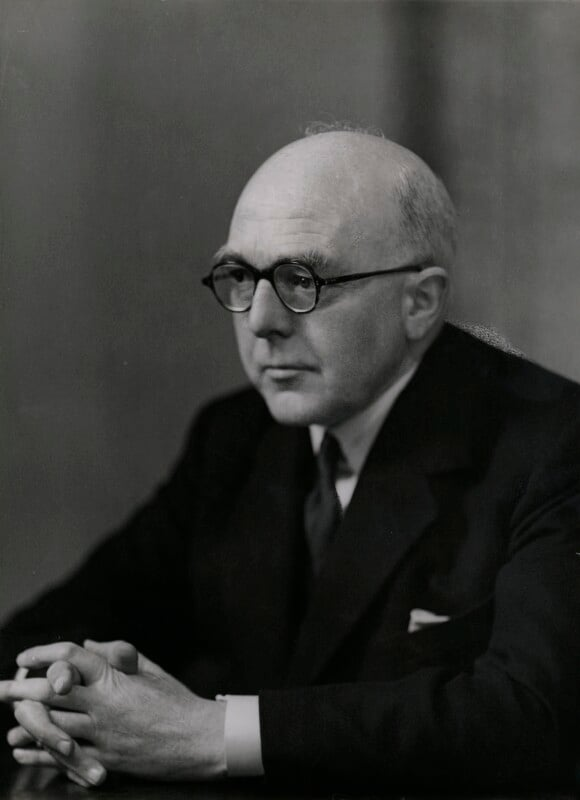
Daley in 1951

Sir William Allen Daley (19 February 1887–February 1969) was a British medical officer of health at the time of the formation of the UK's National Health Service (NHS).

Daley was born in Bootle in 1887. He qualified as a medical doctor in 1912, and married Mary Toomey in 1913. Daley was responsible for the organisation of London's health services during the Second World War, and was knighted in the 1944 Birthday Honours. Daley retired in 1952.

Daley and his wife had two children, including London County Council's chief medical officer Raymond Daley (1917–1989).
