= Midland Railway 2000 Class =

Class of British steam locomotives

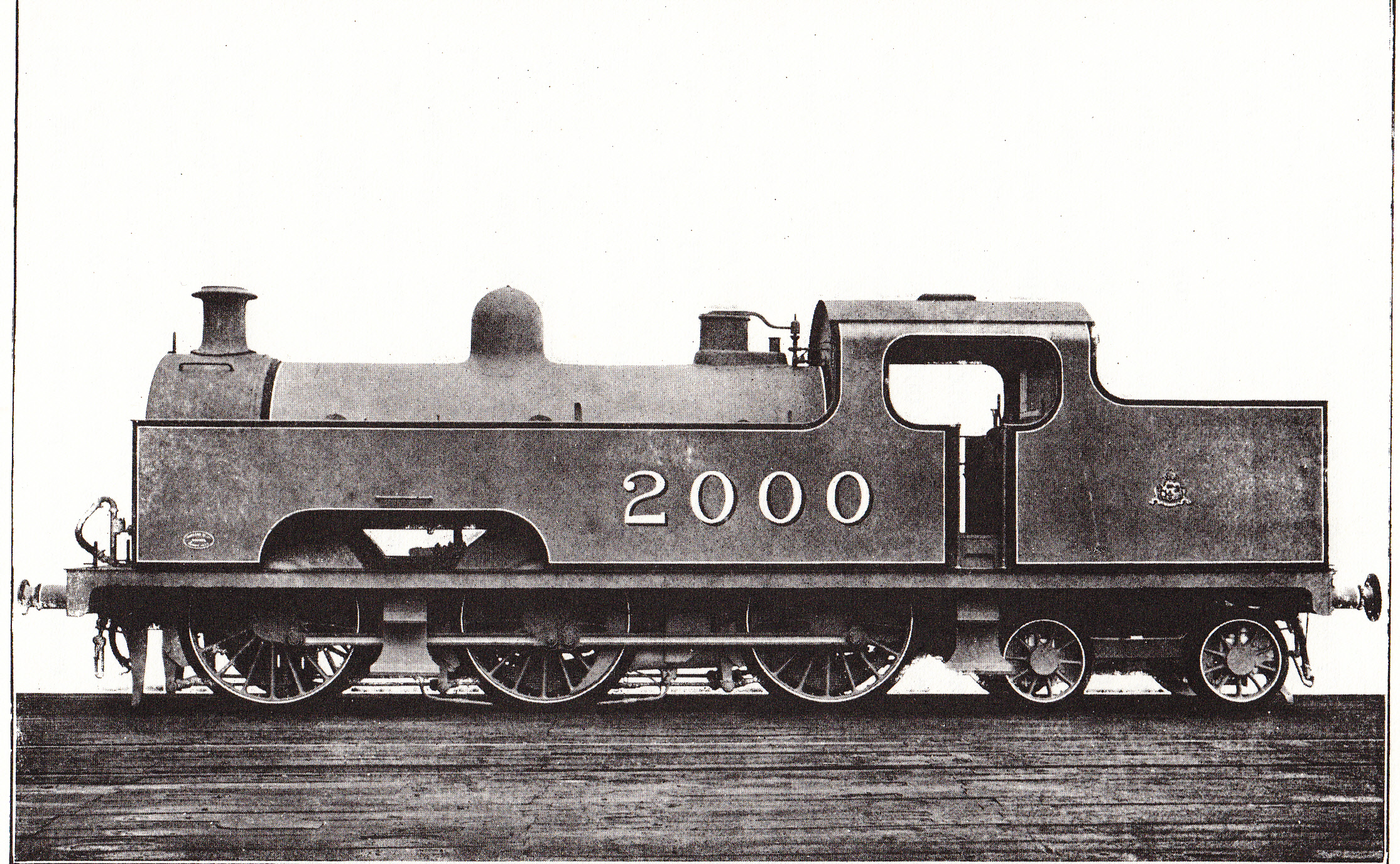
- Midland Railway 0-6-4T 2000 in photographic grey
Type and origin
- Power type: Steam
- Designer: Richard Deeley
- Builder: Derby Works
- Build date: 1907
- Total produced: 40
Specifications
- Configuration
  - Whyte: 0-6-4T
  - UIC: C2′ n2t
- Gauge: 4 ft 8 1/2 in (1,435 mm) standard gauge
- Driver dia.: 5 ft 7 in (1,702 mm)
- Trailing dia.: 3 ft 1 in (940 mm)
- Length: 40 ft 4 1/2 in (12.31 m)
- Loco weight: 72 long tons 8 cwt (162,200 lb or 73.6 t)
- Fuel type: Coal
- Fuel capacity: 3 long tons 10 cwt (7,800 lb or 3.6 t)
- Water cap.: 2,240 imp gal (10,200 L; 2,690 US gal)
- Boiler: MR type H1
- Boiler pressure: 175 psi (1.21 MPa)
- Cylinders: Two, inside
- Cylinder size: 18 1/2 in × 26 in (470 mm × 660 mm)
Performance figures
- Tractive effort: 19,756 lbf (87.88 kN)
Career
- Operators: Midland Railway; London, Midland and Scottish Railway
- Power class: LMS: 3P
- Numbers: 2000–2039
- Nicknames: Flatiron
- Withdrawn: 1935–1938
- Disposition: All scrapped

The Midland Railway 2000 Class was a class of 40 0-6-4T steam locomotives designed by Richard Deeley. They were known as "flatirons" or "hole-in-the-wall tanks" because of their distinctive shape; their side tanks extended to the front of the smokebox and they had a distinct cut-out in the side tanks to access the motion. They were numbered 2000–2039.

== Development ==
They were originally developed from 0-4-4T types designed for commuter work with an extra set of driving wheels. Acceleration and stability were poor however, and after one derailed they were relegated to freight work. All were rebuilt with Belpaire fireboxes and superheaters between 1920 and 1926. The superheated engines had slightly longer smokeboxes which extended slightly in front of the side tanks.

== Ownership change ==
The locomotives passed to the London, Midland and Scottish Railway (LMS) in 1923. They kept their Midland Railway numbers and the LMS gave them the power classification 3P.

== Accidents and incidents ==
The class were rough riders at speed. They were prone to oscillate on poor track, which led to a number of derailments.

- In June 1928, locomotive No. 2015 was hauling a mail train that was derailed at Swinderby, Lincolnshire.
- In August 1928, locomotive No. 2029 was hauling a train that was derailed at Ashton under Hill, Worcestershire.
- On 25 February 1935, locomotive No. 2023 was hauling a passenger train that was derailed at Ashton under Hill. One person was killed.
- In 1935, locomotive No. 2011 was hauling a train that was derailed at Moira, Leicestershire.

== Withdrawal ==
All were withdrawn between 1935 and 1938. The standard parts would have mostly been used for spares rather than scrap. None were preserved.

Table of withdrawals
Year	Number in service at start of year	Number withdrawn	Locomotive numbers
1935	40	8	2007/10–11/20–22/30/38
1936	32	17	2004–06/08–09/13–16/19/26–27/31/33/35–37
1937	15	13	2000–03/17–18/23–25/28–29/34/39
1938	2	2	2012, 2032
