= Edward Wyllie Fenton =

Scottish botanist (1889–1962)

Dr Edward Wyllie Fenton FRSE FLS (1889–1962) was a Scottish botanist. He was President of the Botanical Society of Edinburgh 1944–45.

== Life ==
He was born in Aberdeen on 4 November 1889, the son of Edward W. Fenton, a clerk living at 13 Bon Accord Street. He attended Aberdeen University graduating in 1913. He began lecturing in Botany at the university as soon as he qualified. As with many, his career was interrupted by the First World War during which he served in the Royal Field Artillery. He was commissioned on 6 July 1915. He served in Britain as Chief Instructor in the Signalling Section at the rank of Lieutenant.

From 1920 he headed the Botany Department in the newly built Seale-Hayne College in Devon in the south of England. In 1927 he returned to Scotland to head the East of Scotland College of Agriculture, remaining in this role until retiral in 1954.

In 1928 he was elected a Fellow of the Royal Society of Edinburgh. His proposers were Alexander Lauder, Sir William Wright Smith, James Hartley Ashworth and William Edgar Evans. Aberdeen University awarded him an honorary doctorate (DSc) in 1936.

He died at Milltimber, Aberdeen on 16 September 1962.

== Publications ==
- Egg Coloration in the Cuckoo (1914)
- Animal Ecology (1927)
- The Influence of Sectional Grazing and Manuring on the Flora of Grassland (1931)
- Utilisation of Marginal Land (1942)
