= LNER Thompson Class L1 =

British steam locomotive class (1945–1962)

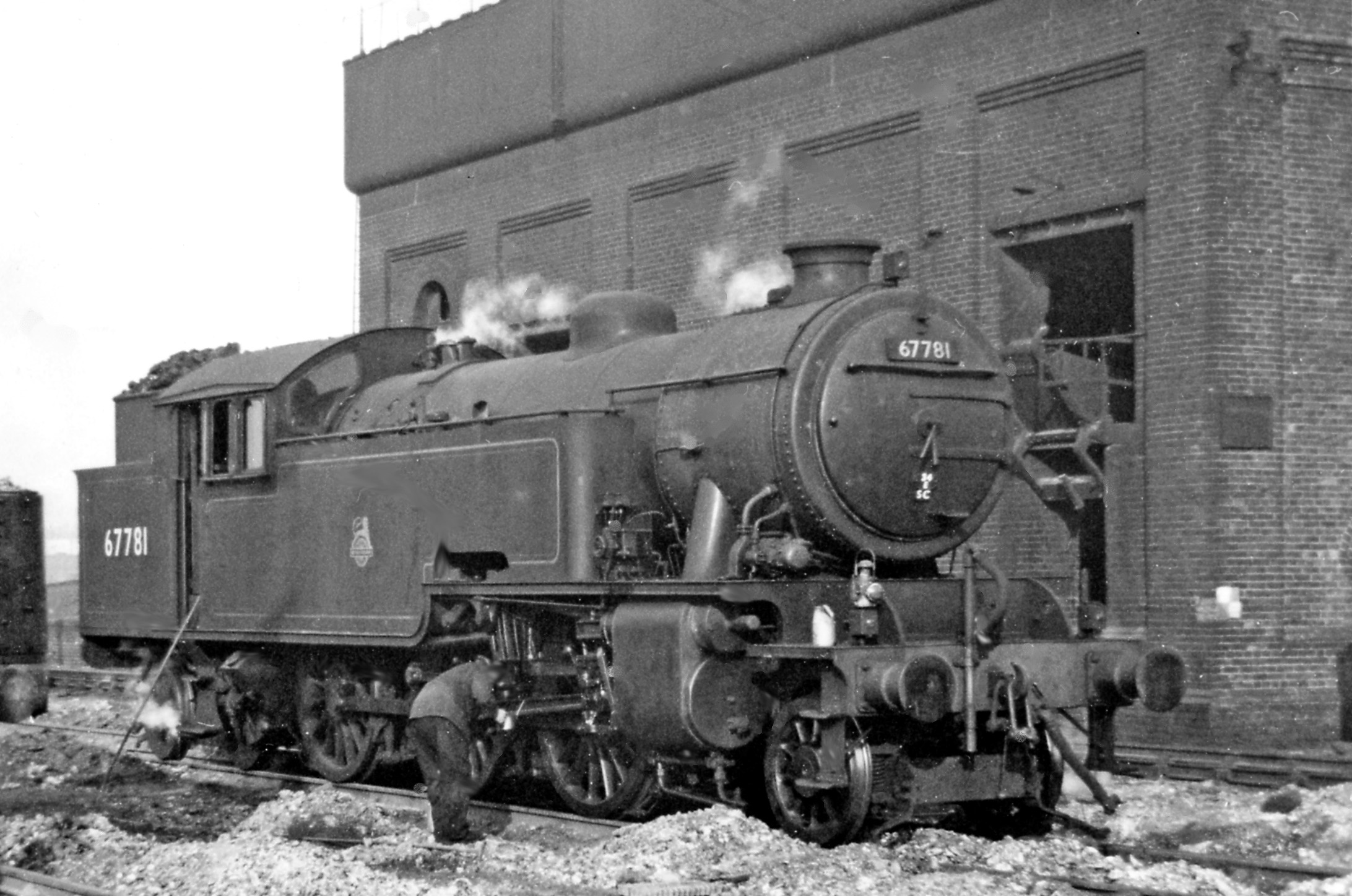
- No. 67781 at Neasden Shed 1957
Type and origin
- Power type: Steam
- Designer: Edward Thompson
- Builder: Doncaster Works (1); Darlington Works (29); North British Locomotive Co. (35); Robert Stephenson and Hawthorns (35)
- Build date: 1945, 1948–1950
- Total produced: 100
Specifications
- Configuration
  - Whyte: 2-6-4T
  - UIC: 1′C2′ h2t
- Gauge: 4 ft 8 1/2 in (1,435 mm)
- Leading dia.: 3 ft 2 in (0.965 m)
- Driver dia.: 5 ft 2 in (1.575 m)
- Trailing dia.: 3 ft 2 in (0.965 m)
- Length: 43 ft 4 in (13.21 m)
- Axle load: 20.00 long tons (20.32 t)
- Adhesive weight: 58.95 long tons (59.90 t)
- Loco weight: 89.45 long tons (90.89 t)
- Fuel type: Coal
- Fuel capacity: 4.50 long tons (4.57 t)
- Water cap.: 2,630 imp gal (12,000 L; 3,160 US gal)
- Firebox
  - Grate area: 24.75 sq ft (2.299 m^{2})
- Boiler: LNER diagram 115
- Boiler pressure: 225 lbf/in^{2} (1.55 MPa), 200 lbf/in^{2} (1.38 MPa)
- Heating surface
  - Firebox: 138.5 sq ft (12.87 m^{2})
  - Tubes: 830.0 sq ft (77.11 m^{2})
  - Flues: 368.0 sq ft (34.19 m^{2})
  - Total surface: 1,336.5 sq ft (124.16 m^{2})
- Superheater
  - Heating area: 284.0 sq ft (26.38 m^{2})
- Cylinders: Two, outside
- Cylinder size: 20 in × 26 in (508 mm × 660 mm), 18.75 in × 26 in (476 mm × 660 mm) on some engines
- Valve type: 10-inch (254 mm) piston valves
Performance figures
- Tractive effort: 32,080 lbf (142.70 kN) on most engines, between 25,063 lbf (111.49 kN) and 28,516 lbf (126.85 kN) on some engines experimentally
Career
- Operators: London and North Eastern Railway; British Railways
- Class: L1
- Power class: BR: 4MT
- Numbers: BR: 67701–67800
- Axle load class: Route Availability 7
- Locale: Eastern Region; North Eastern Region; Scottish Region
- Withdrawn: 1960–1962
- Disposition: All scrapped

The London and North Eastern Railway (LNER) Thompson Class L1 was a class of 2-6-4T type steam locomotives designed by Edward Thompson. The prototype no. 9000 was built in 1945, but the remaining 99 were built under British Railways jurisdiction between 1948 and 1950. The prototype was well received, however the production batch were not, and all were withdrawn and scrapped between 1960 and 1962.

== Background ==
The class was designed to address the lack of modern tank engines on the Central and Eastern sections of the LNER, replacing the six Metropolitan Railway K Class and to serve alongside the eighty Gresley V1/V3 tank engines. Under Edward Thompson, who sought to standardise on the large number of locomotives of the LNER, the L1 was designed to be able to carry out both passenger and goods work.

== Design ==
Similar to other Thompson designs, the design reused many standard components. The cylinders were the same as the B1, with a boiler based on the V3 design uprated to 225 psi (1,550 kPa). The engine had a large water capacity of 2,360 imp gal (10,700 L; 2,830 US gal) and 4.5 long tons (4.6 t; 5.0 short tons) coal capacity. The 5 ft 2 in (1.575 m) driving wheels and boiler pressure gave a tractive effort of 32,080 lbf (142.7 kN). To operate on the Eastern section, Westinghouse brakes and vacuum ejectors were fitted.

Aiding crew comforts were electric cab lighting, electric head and tail lights, folding discs and good visibility when running bunker first. The running plate featured a cutout for better access to the motion and easing maintenance.

Both the production batch from Darlington and Robert Stephenson and Co. incorporated minor changes from No. 9000. This ranged from style of the cab doors, cylinder linings, boiler pressure to fabricated axle boxes. It is noted that the axle boxes and water tanks were welded, being built by British Railways after both Thompson and Peppercorn had retired.

In an attempt to solve the overheating axle box issue, two experiments were tried. In May 1951, five locomotives had liners fitted to their cylinders to reduce the cylinder bore from 20 to 18 3/4 in (508 to 476 mm). In March 1953, five locomotives had their boiler pressure reduced from 225 to 200 lbf/in^{2} (1.55 to 1.38 MPa). Neither experiment was a success. Simon A.C. Martin asserts that the reason for the overheating axle boxes was due to leaking water tanks, and that the issue was resolved by making sure they were watertight.

== Performance ==
The first of the class, No. 9000, was the only member of the class to be built by the LNER, and emerged in May 1945 from Doncaster painted in LNER Apple Green. The engine was well received with praise from enthusiasts and railwaymen at the time, and underwent the most extensive set of trials with an LNER locomotive, bar the LNER Class W1. It hauled every type of train possible, mostly with the dynamometer car recording results.

The small 5 ft 2 in (1.575 m) driving wheels limited their maximum speed, but were ideal for accelerating from rest or on gradients, such as the London suburban area. Coal and water consumption were lower than that of other locomotives, and it was also capable of pulling greater loads.

Both O.S. Nock and Peter Grafton remarked that the prototype achieved a punctual run on a 366 long tons (372 t; 410 short tons) express passenger train between Liverpool Street and Ipswich at an economical water consumption of under 30 imp gal (140 L; 36 US gal) per mile; in addition to the 386 long tons (392 t; 432 short tons) return train consuming less than 0.1 lb per train ton mile. The two both remarks that such a feat was not intentional, and could only be considered exceptional. The prototype was also trialed on coal trains, although its insufficient braking capacity and adhesion mitigated against its use on said services. It managed just over 10,000 mi (16,000 km) in the latter half of 1945, but improved substantially to around 28,000 mi (45,000 km) in 1946, matching Gresley V1s and V3s. Both it and Gresley V1s had similar availability numbers at 79%, higher than the higher pressure V3 design with 68% availability.

The rest of the class were ordered under Arthur Peppercorn, who ordered minor changes to the production L1s, and would emerge under British Railways.

During widespread service they were poorly received, with complaints such as "shaking themselves to bits", "concrete mixers" and "too small driving wheels". The production batch was also said to be more temperamental than their prototype. Due to a lack of improved draughting and fitting of a self-cleaning smokebox, they had to carefully handled by crews. L1s were used on empty stock workings, and reportedly struggled to move empty sleeping car trains out of King's Cross.

It is also said that their axle boxes suffered from overheating. Modifications were made to solve the issue, such as reducing the diameter of the cylinders and reducing the boiler pressure. However, the modifications seemed to not have been successful, and the class suffered from the issue until their withdrawal. Although Simon A.C. Martin claims that the issue was caused by leaking water tanks introducing detritus and removing lubrication, and was largely solved with axle box shims and making sure the tanks were watertight.

== Accidents ==
- On 19 November 1958, a freight train overran signals and was in a rear-end collision with another at Hitchin, Hertfordshire. A third freight train ran into the wreckage and was derailed. Locomotive No. 67785 was pushed over by the wagons from the third train.

== Numbering ==
Class numbering details
Build date	Builder	Serial number	LNER number	Original BR number	New BR number
1945	LNER Doncaster Works	1984	9000	69000	67701
1948	BR Darlington Works	2020–2034	9001–9003, E9004–E9012	69001–69015	67702–67716
1948	BR Darlington Works	2035–2048	—	–	67717–67730
1948–1949	North British Locomotive Company	26570–26604	—	—	67731–67765
1949–1950	Robert Stephenson and Hawthorns	7500–7534	—	—	67766–67800

== Withdrawal ==
Withdrawals were between 1960 and 1962. None survived to preservation.

Year	Quantity in service at start of year	Quantity withdrawn	Locomotive numbers	Notes
1960	100	12	67701–02/04–06/08–09/11/14/25–26/36	
1961	88	24	67707/12–13/17–19/22/28/32/38–40/48/50/58/60/62/68–69/72/75/82/90/94	
1962	64	64	67703/10/15–16/20–21/23–24/27/29–31/33–35/37/41–47/49/51–57/59/61/63–67/70–71/73–74/76–81/83–89/91–93/95–800	

== Modelling ==
Hornby produces the L1 class in 00 gauge with a number of different liveries, both green with LNER or BR running numbers, and black with BR running numbers.
