= 0-6-4T =

Tank locomotive wheel arrangement

0-6-4
- Front of locomotive at left

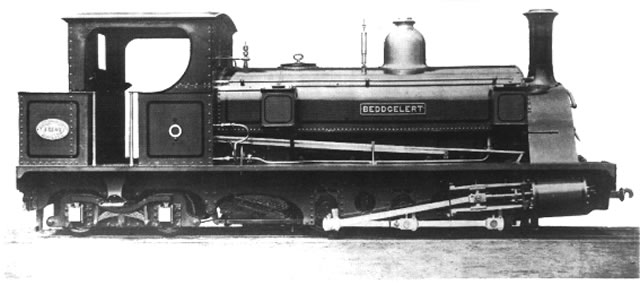
- Beddgelert of the North Wales Narrow Gauge Railways
Equivalent classifications
- UIC class: C2, C2'
- French class: 032
- Turkish class: 35
- Swiss class: 3/5
- Russian class: 0-3-2
First known tank engine version
- First use: 1875
- Country: England
- Locomotive: Moel Tryfan
- Railway: North Wales Narrow Gauge Railways
- Designer: George Percival Spooner
- Builder: Vulcan Foundry
- Evolved from: 0-6-2

Under the Whyte notation for the classification of steam locomotives, 0-6-4 represents the wheel arrangement of no leading wheels, six powered and coupled driving wheels on three axles, and four trailing wheels on two axles.

== Overview ==
This wheel arrangement has only been used for tank locomotives and Single Fairlies, no 0-6-4 tender locomotives were documented nor manufactured. The earliest known example was the Moel Tryfan narrow gauge locomotive, built for use on the North Wales Narrow Gauge Railways. It was a Single Fairlie type, built by the Vulcan Foundry near Manchester in 1875. It was followed by the R class and S class, built by the Avonside Engine Company of England for the New Zealand Railways Department between 1878 and 1881.

== Usage ==
=== Australia ===
The South Australian Railways K class locomotives were introduced in 1884, designed by William Thow. They were noted to run more smoothly bunker-first. After the electrification of the Mersey Railway in England, four of its 0-6-4T locomotives were sold to J & A Brown of New South Wales, Australia, where one, number 5, is preserved at the NSW Rail Museum, Thirlmere, New South Wales.

Three members of New Zealand's S class were also sold to the Western Australian Government Railways in 1891.

=== New Zealand ===
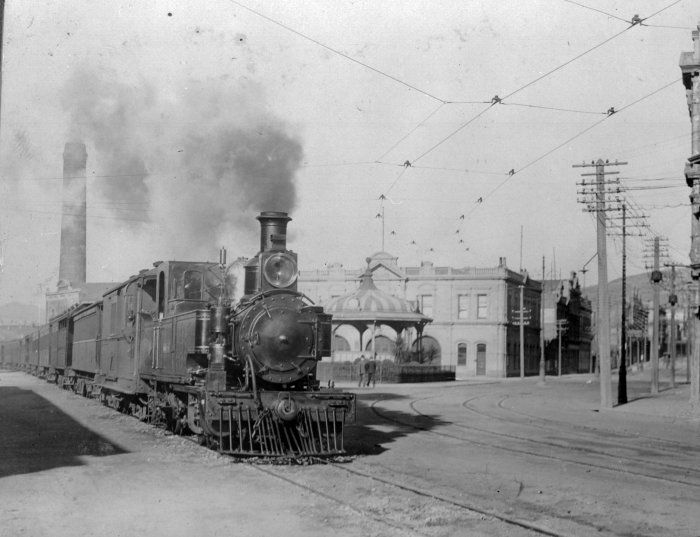
NZR R class Locomotive on Jervois Quay, Wellington

New Zealand's R class and S class Single Fairlies were popular with crews and capable of all duties from express passenger trains to shunting tasks. The S class were limited to the Wellington Region when they were introduced, but the R class were distributed throughout the country. All were withdrawn by 1936, but R class no. 28 is preserved as a static exhibit in a Reefton park.

=== South Africa ===
==== Netherlands-South African Railway Company ====
This wheel arrangement provided the bulk of the motive power for the 3 ft 6 in (1,067 mm) Nederlandsche-Zuid-Afrikaansche Spoorwegmaatschappij (NZASM) in the Zuid-Afrikaansche Republiek (ZAR). Between 1893 and 1898, 175 46 Tonner 0-6-4T steam locomotives were placed in service, built by the Maschinenfabrik Esslingen in Germany.

In 1899, twenty more were ordered from the Nederlandse Fabriek van Werktuigen en Spoorwegmaterieel (Werkspoor) in the Netherlands, of which only two were delivered by the time the Imperial Military Railways (IMR) took over all railway operations in the ZAR during the Second Boer War. The other eighteen locomotives in this order were delivered directly to the IMR, who diverted two of them to Lourenço Marques in Mozambique.

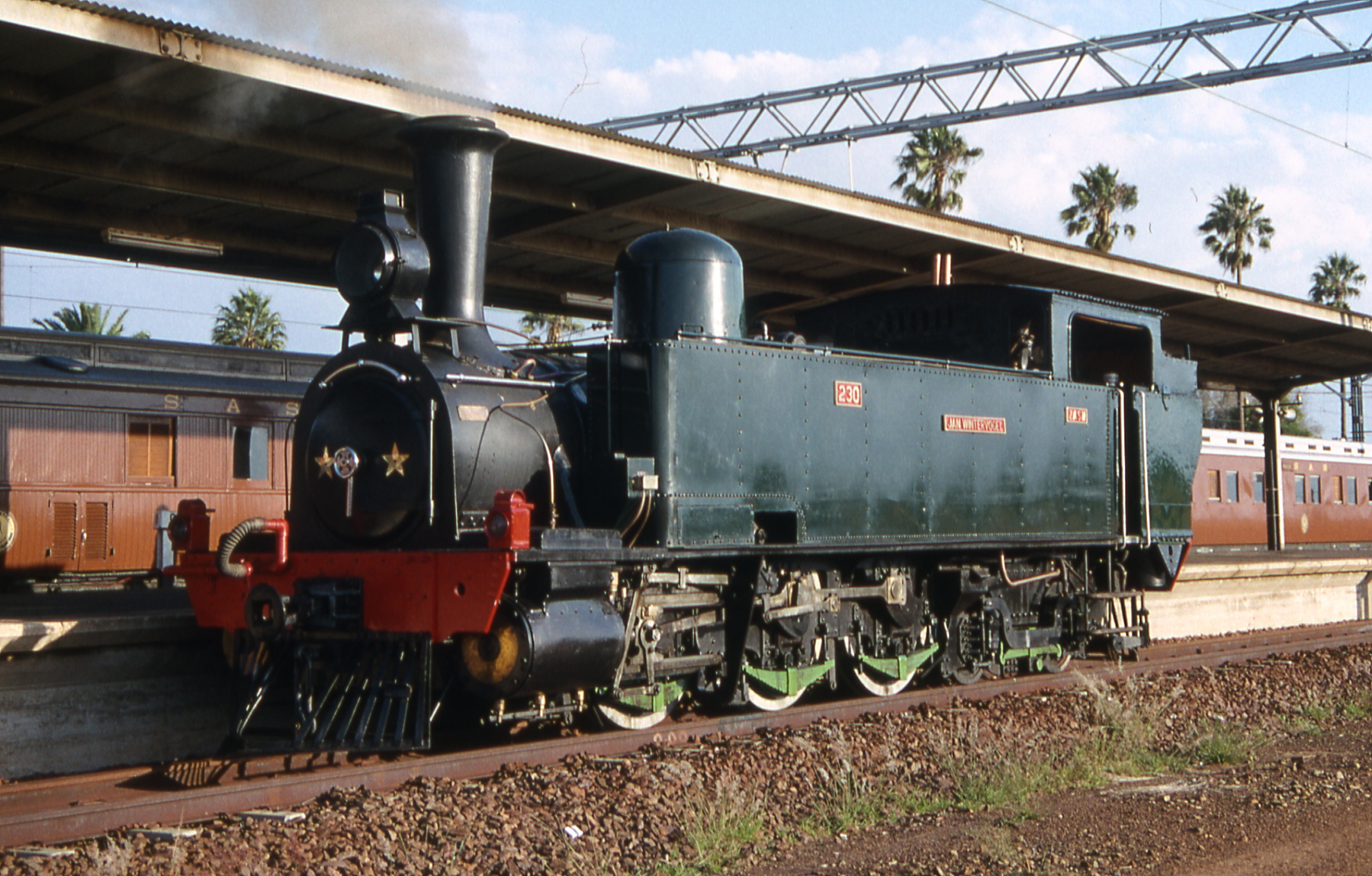
Preserved NZASM 46 Tonner no. 230 Jan Wintervogel

At the end of the war, the survivors of these locomotives were taken onto the roster of the Central South African Railways (CSAR) and designated Class B, while the two in Mozambique were taken onto the roster of the Caminhos de Ferro de Mocambique (CFM). In 1912, the remaining CSAR locomotives were assimilated into the South African Railways (SAR).

==== Mozambique ====
The CFM eventually had at least thirty 46 Tonner locomotives in service. Between 1897 and 1898, some 46 Tonners were sold by the NZASM to the CFM. The two locomotives which were delivered after the outbreak of the war and diverted to Lourenço Marques upon arrival, were also taken onto the CFM roster at the end of the war. Later, between 1911 and 1920 during the CSAR and SAR eras, six more were sold to the CFM.

=== United Kingdom ===
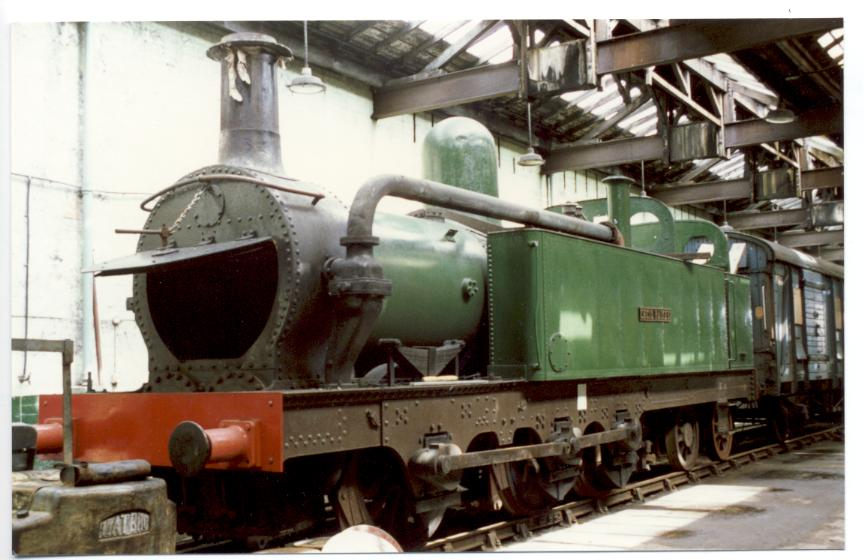
Mersey Railway condensing 0-6-4T No.5 Cecil Raikes

Other than examples for export, 0-6-4T locomotives enjoyed a brief vogue in the United Kingdom prior to the First World War, but were not widely used. Nine locomotives of this type were supplied by Beyer, Peacock & Company for the opening of the Mersey Railway in 1886.

William Dean built three crane tanks in 1901, and Kitson & Company of Leeds supplied nine locomotives to the Lancashire, Derbyshire & East Coast Railway in 1904.

Other examples included the Midland Railway 2000 Class of 1907, the Highland Railway Drummond 0-6-4T Class of 1909, the SECR J class of 1913 and the Metropolitan Railway G Class of 1915. The type was eventually superseded by the popular 2-6-4T locomotive.

=== North America ===
In the United States, the 0-6-4 was largely used only on Mason Bogie locomotives. One 0-6-4T Mason Bogie locomotive, #3 Torch Lake, survives and works at Greenfield Village in Dearborn, Michigan, and is the only surviving Mason Bogie. However, in Canada, a pair of conventional 0-6-4T locomotives were built in 1912 as switchers by the Canadian Pacific Railway, lasting until 1951.
