= North Pacific Coast Railroad =

Railroad in California

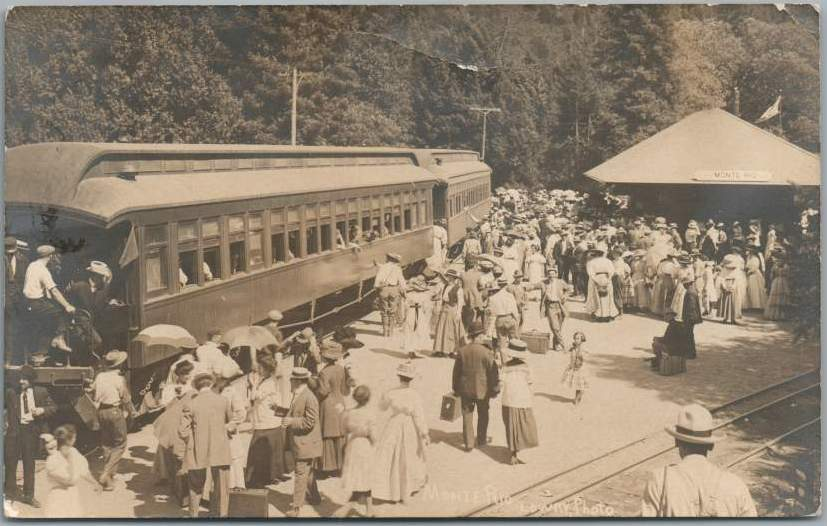
- Postcard view of a train at Monte Rio station

Overview
- Headquarters: Sausalito, California
- Reporting mark: NPC
- Locale: Marin and Sonoma counties, California
- Dates of operation: 1871–1907
- Successor: Northwestern Pacific Railroad

Technical
- Track gauge: 4 ft 8 1/2 in (1,435 mm) standard gauge
- Previous gauge: 3 ft (914 mm)

The North Pacific Coast Railroad (NPC) was a common carrier 3 ft (914 mm) narrow-gauge steam railroad begun in 1874 and sold in 1902 to new owners who renamed it the North Shore Railroad (California) (NSR) and rebuilt the southern section into a standard-gauge electric railway.

The NPC operated in the northern California counties of Marin and Sonoma that carried redwood lumber, local dairy and agricultural products, express and passengers. The NPC operated almost 93 mi (150 km) of track that extended from a pier at Sausalito (which connected the line via ferry to San Francisco) and operated northwest to Duncans Mills and Cazadero (also known as Ingrams). The NPC became the North Shore Railroad (California) (NSR) on March 7, 1902. In 1907 the North Shore Railroad became part of the Northwestern Pacific Railroad (NWP). Southern portions of the line were standard gauged and electrified by the North Shore for suburban passenger service, though tracks north of Point Reyes Station remained 3 ft (914 mm) narrow gauge until abandonment in the late 1930s.

== Route ==
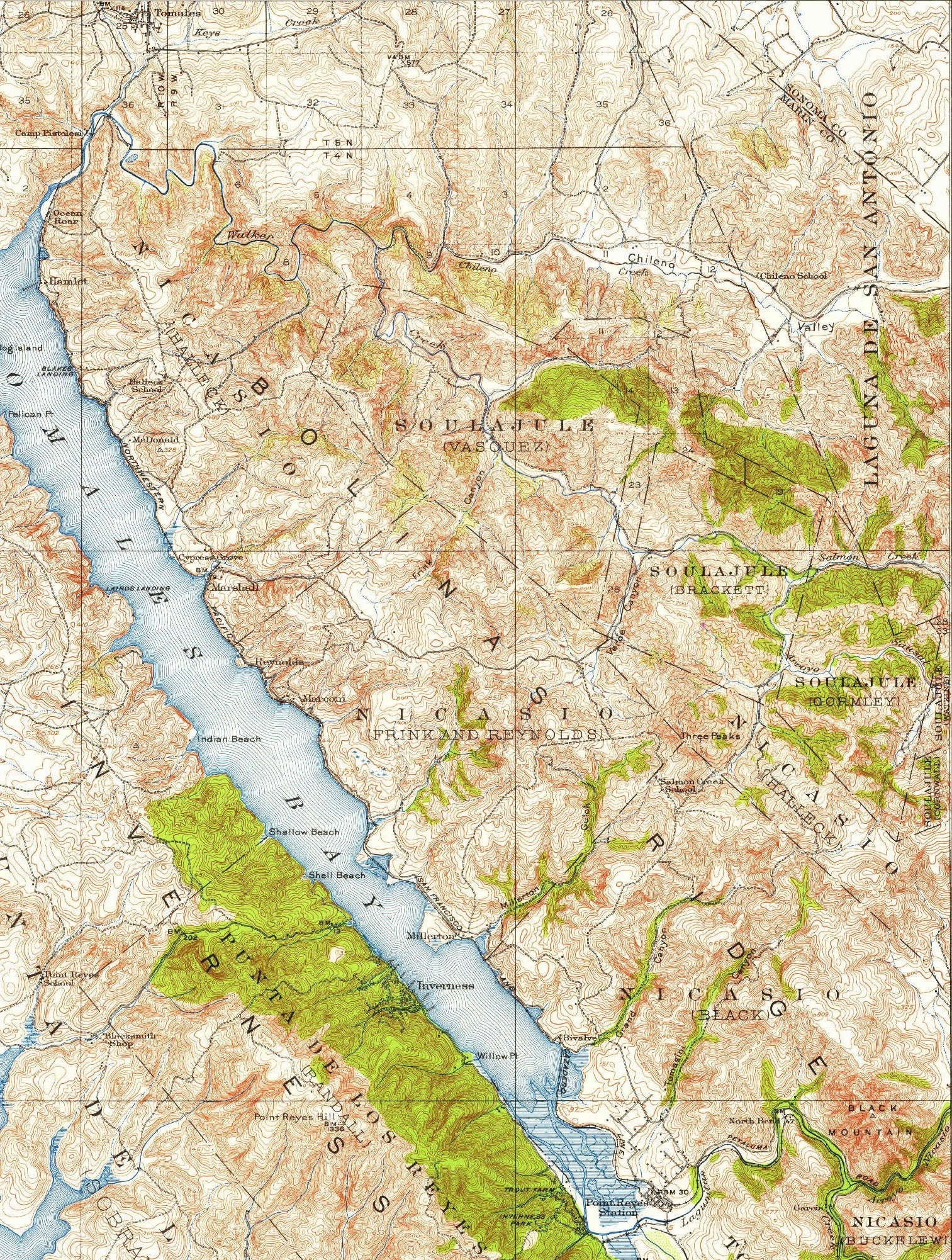
Portion of route along Tomales Bay

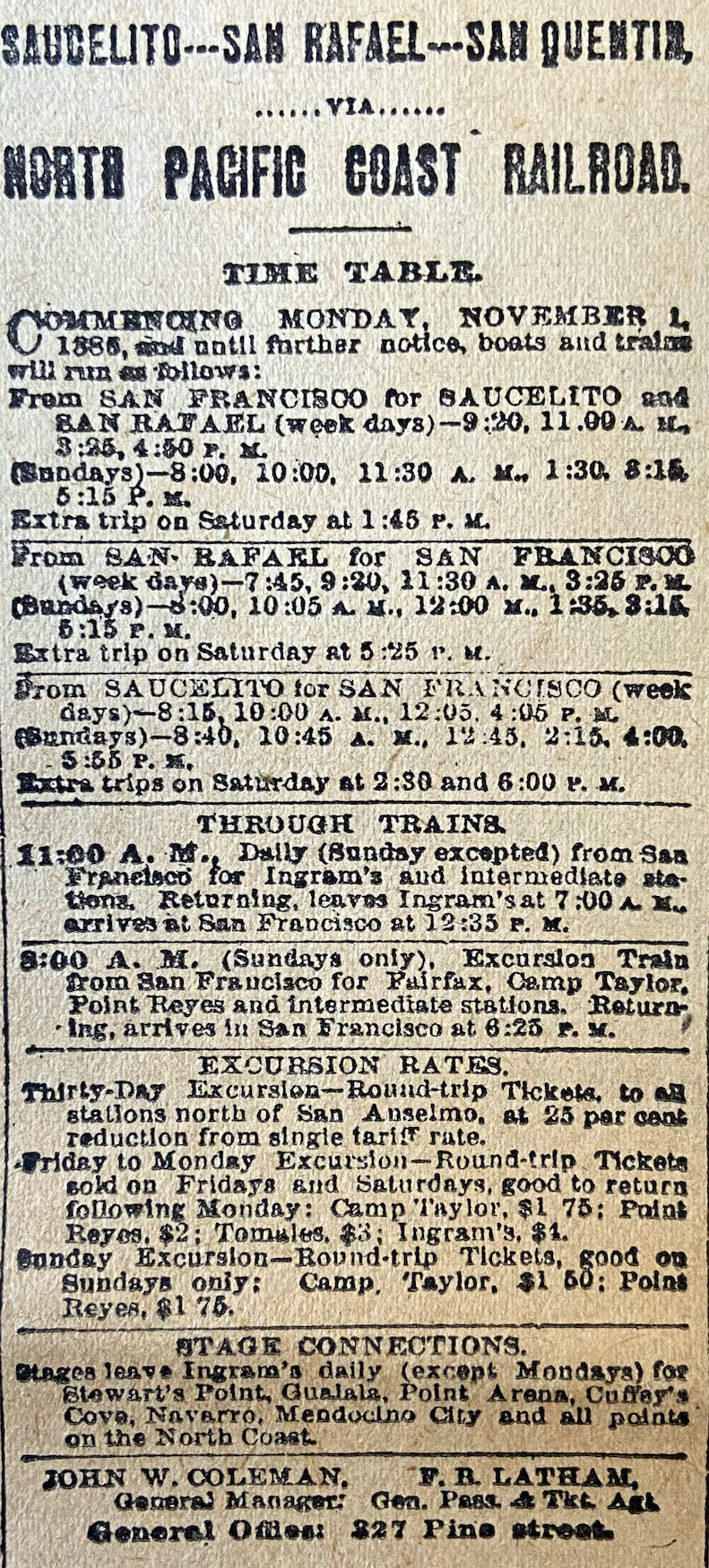
Schedule and rates for March 1887 (note the spelling for Sausalito)

Mileposts conform to Southern Pacific Railroad convention of distance from San Francisco:

- San Francisco – Sausalito via Ferry
- Sausalito (milepost 6.5)
- San Rafael
- Junction (later known as San Anselmo) (milepost 16.5)
- Fairfax (milepost 18.3)
- Point Reyes Station (milepost 36.4)
- Marshall (milepost 45.4)
- Tomales (milepost 53.1)
- Valley Ford (milepost 59.5)
- Freestone (milepost 63.7)
- Occidental (milepost 67.6)
- Monte Rio (milepost 73.8)
- Duncans Mills (milepost 77.1)
- Cazadero (milepost 84.3)

Subsequent to abandonment, a 4-mile (6.4 km) segment around Samuel P. Taylor State Park was converted into a rail trail: the Cross Marin Trail. It includes a segment in Tocaloma as well as the bridge over Lagunitas Creek and Sir Francis Drake Boulevard.

== Electrification ==
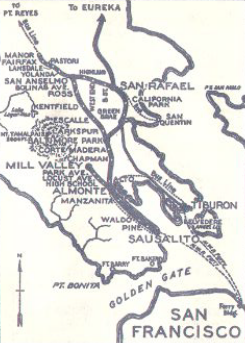
1939 map of electric service

The NSR was operated by John Martin and Eugene de Sabla Jr., pioneers in the electric railroad business. The southern 23 miles (37 km) of line were modernized to allow operation of standard-gauge electric passenger cars in addition to narrow-gauge steam-powered freight trains. Electric cars sometimes shared dual-gauge tracks with the steam trains, while at other locations a separate track for the electric cars was constructed parallel to the narrow-gauge route. The line was ultimately double tracked from Sausalito to San Anselmo except for the Alto tunnel. A power house was built at Alto and power was also purchased at San Rafael. Direct current electrical power was transmitted to the trains at 600 volts by a third rail (which was actually a fourth rail on the dual-gauge segments.) Service started to Mill Valley on August 20, 1903, and to San Rafael on October 17, 1903. It was the first United States steam railroad electrified for operational efficiency rather than for smoke abatement. The railroad established practices later used in Grand Central Terminal and the interborough subways of New York City. The electric lines were expanded after 1907 as part of the Northwestern Pacific Railroad. Interurban services ceased on February 28, 1941.

== Locomotives ==
Photograph	Number	Name	Builder	Type	Date	Works number	Notes
	1	Saucelito	Baldwin Locomotive Works	2-6-0	1873	3495	sold to White Lumber Company of Elk, California 1876
	2	San Rafael	Mason Machine Works	0-4-4T	1874	537	burned at Tomales 1905 & rebuilt became NWP #89
	3	Tomales	Baldwin Locomotive Works	4-4-0	1875	3722	became NWP #83
	4	Olema	Baldwin Locomotive Works	4-4-0	1874	3629	wrecked 1894 & rebuilt became NWP #81
	5	Bodega	Baldwin Locomotive Works	4-4-0	1875	3703	dismantled by 1897
	6	Valley Ford	Baldwin Locomotive Works	4-4-0	1874	3664	leased to Dollar Lumber Company in 1899
	7	Tamalpais	Baldwin Locomotive Works	4-4-0	1875	3721	
	8	Bully Boy	Mason Machine Works	0-6-6T	1877	584	burned at Tomales 1905
	9	M. S. Latham	Baldwin Locomotive Works	4-4-0	1875	3749	wrecked 14 January 1894 at Elim Grove trestle over Austin Creek
	10	Bloomfield	Baldwin Locomotive Works	4-4-0	1876	3840	sold 1895 Guatemala Western #1
	11	Marin	Baldwin Locomotive Works	4-4-0	1876	3842	became NWP #82
	12	Sonoma	Baldwin Locomotive Works	4-4-0	1876	3843	sold 1879 Nevada Central #5 (preserved at California State Railroad Museum)
	13		Baldwin Locomotive Works	2-6-0	1883	6611	became NWP #195
	14		Brooks Locomotive Works	4-4-0	1891	1885	became NWP #92
	15		Brooks Locomotive Works	4-4-0	1891	1886	became NWP #90
	16		Brooks Locomotive Works	4-4-0	1894	2421	became NWP #91
	17		Baldwin Locomotive Works	4-4-0	1875	3749	NPC 1894 rebuild of wreck-damaged #9 wrecked again in 1900
	18		Brooks Locomotive Works	4-6-0	1899	3418	reputedly the largest 3 ft (914 mm) gauge locomotive in the world when built. Became NWP #145 then #95
	20		NPC Sausalito shop	4-4-0	1900	1	became NWP #84
	21	Thomas-Stetson	NPC Sausalito shop	4-4-0	1901	2	cab-forward rebuild of #5 scrapped 1905
	22		Baldwin Locomotive Works	4-4-0	1874	3664	former #6 renumbered when returned from Dollar Lumber Company in 1901

=== Roster of electric cars ===
Number	Builder	Type	Date	Capacity	Notes
101-112	St. Louis Car Co.	Trailers	1902	66 seats	twelve unpowered open platform wooden trailers; #102 built in North Shore shops
201-202	North Shore shops	Motors	1904	32 seats & baggage/mail/express compartment	two vestibuled wooden motors converted from narrow-gauge Pullman coaches built in 1879
203	North Shore shops	Motor	1904	50 seats	open platform wooden motor converted from narrow-gauge Pullman coach built in 1879; renumbered 309
301-308	St. Louis Car Co.	Motors	1902	64 to 70 seats	open platform wooden motors; #303-308 built in North Shore shops
350-358	St. Louis Car Co.	Motors	1902	36 seats & baggage/mail/express compartment	nine vestibuled wooden motors
401-404	North Shore shops	Trailers	1904	66 seats	four unpowered open platform wooden trailers converted from narrow-gauge Pullman coaches built in 1879

== Ferries ==
- Lagunitas, launched 31 January 1903 from the W. A. Boole & Son shipyard in Oakland

== Remains ==
All of the NPC trackage has been abandoned either by the NPC or the NWP. Some of the original right of way can be seen at the Samuel P. Taylor State Park near Fairfax, and along the shores of Tomales Bay and Keyes Estuary. Former stations remain in San Anselmo, Duncans Mills, and Point Reyes Station. The wooden water tank and a freight shed are maintained and in good condition at Freestone.

One NPC steam locomotive, No.12 the "Sonoma," remains as a restored static exhibit in its c. 1870s appearance at the California State Railroad Museum in Sacramento. The firm of Carter Brothers provided engineering and contract services, and also built many cars for the line. A flatcar NS 1725 and caboose NS 2002 (as NWP 6101) have been restored and are operated by the Society for the Preservation of Carter Railroad Resources at its Railroad Museum at Ardenwood in Fremont, CA. Several former railroad cars are located at Duncans Mills; one, a former passenger coach, was used as the Point Reyes Station library beginning in 1931.

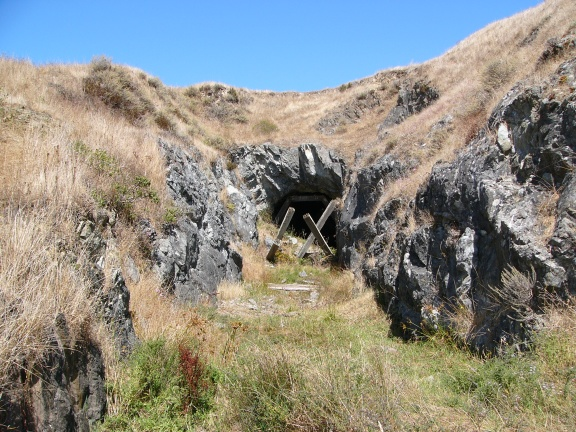
A former tunnel near Keys Creek

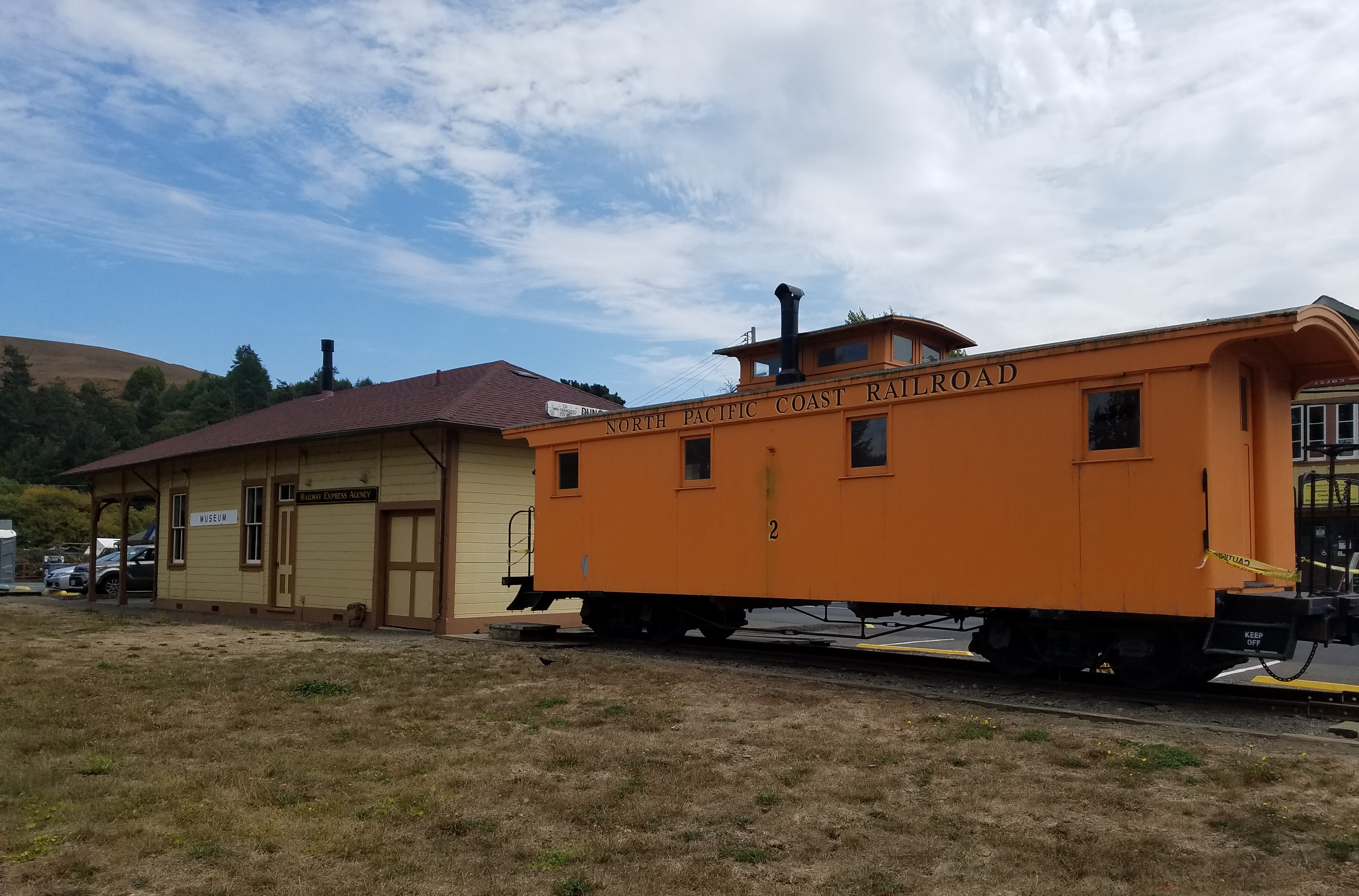
Caboose #2 preserved adjacent to the depot at Duncans Mills, California

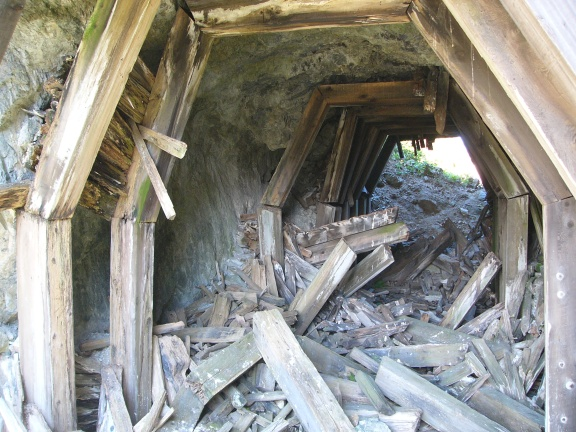
Inside the tunnel

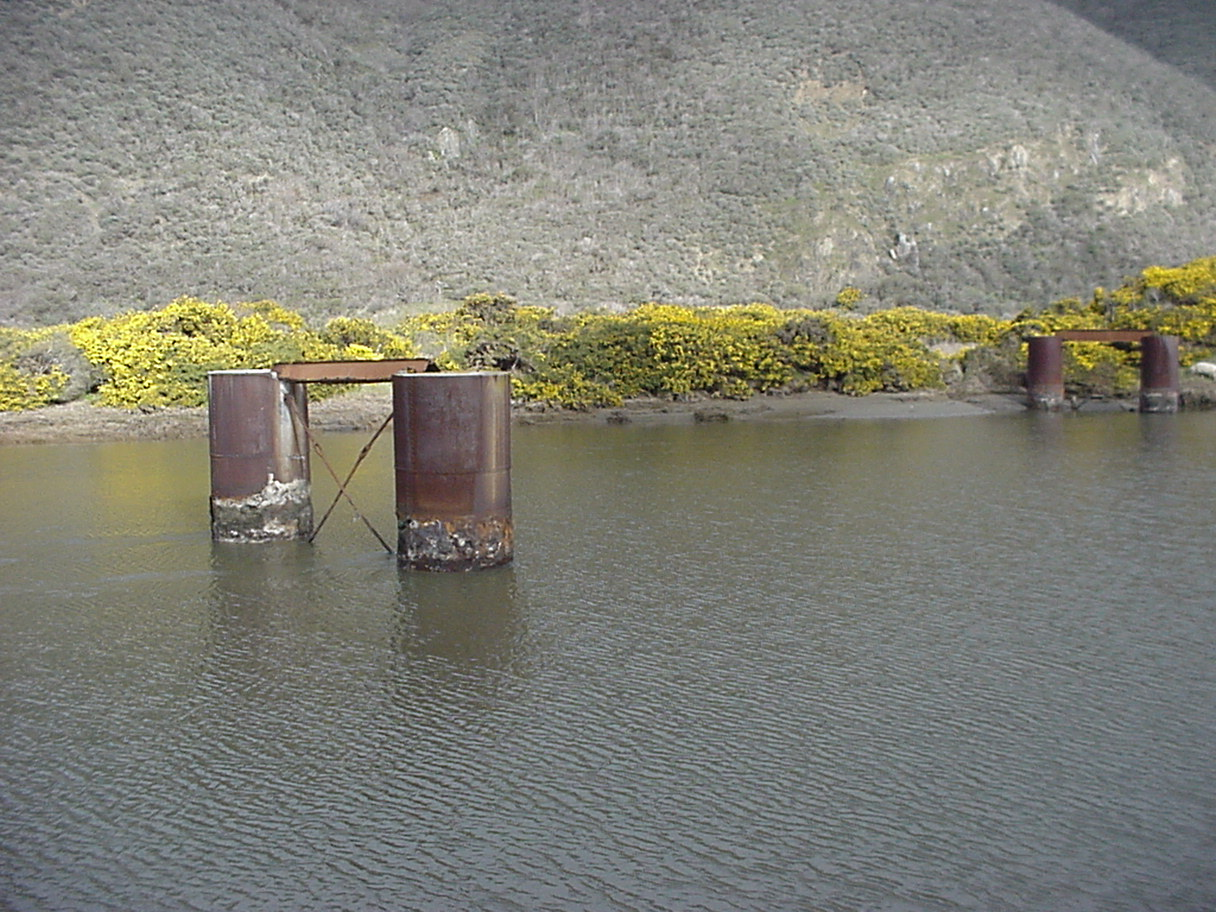
Bridge over Keys Estuary, viewed from California State Route 1

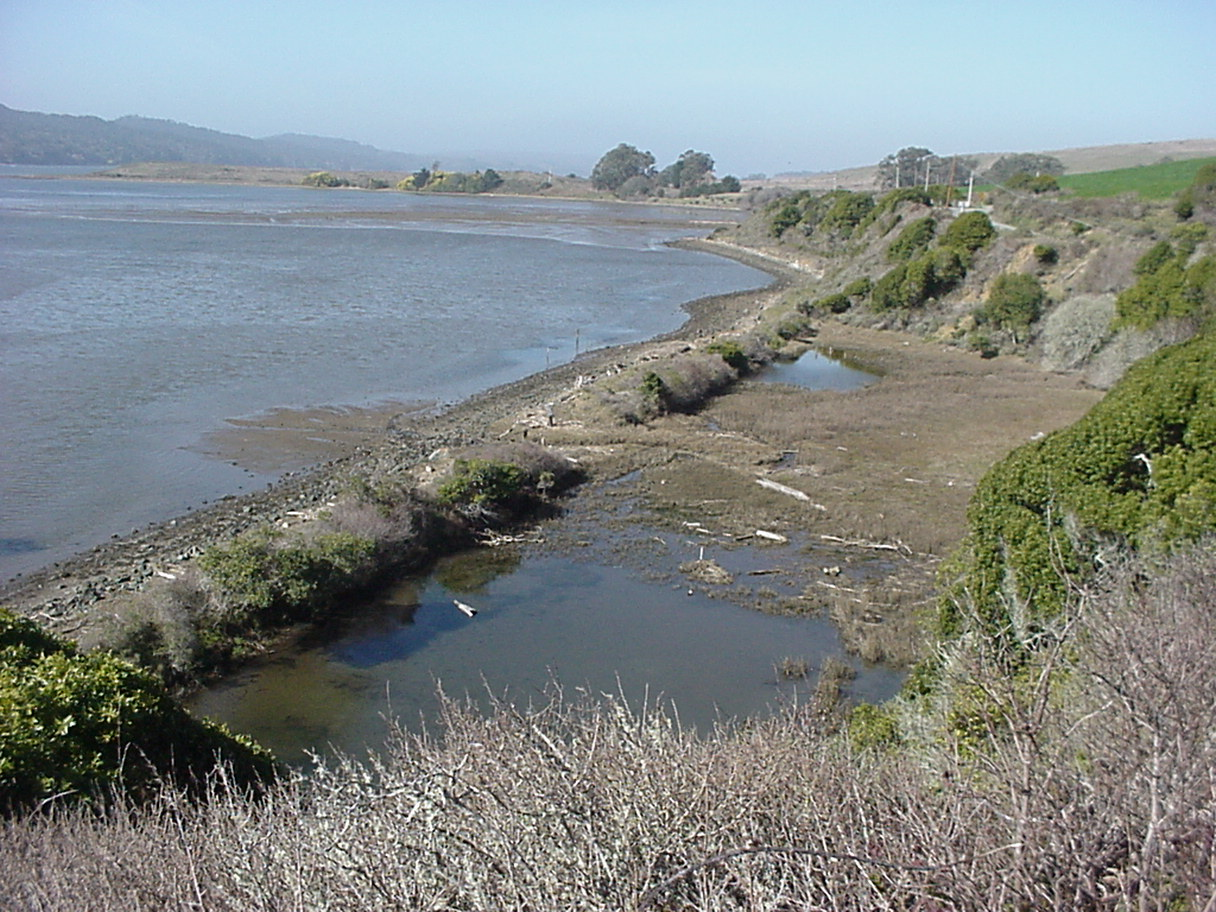
Former railroad grade adjacent to Tomales Bay, viewed from California State Route 1
