= 0-6-6T =

Tank locomotive wheel arrangement

0-6-6
- Front of locomotive at left

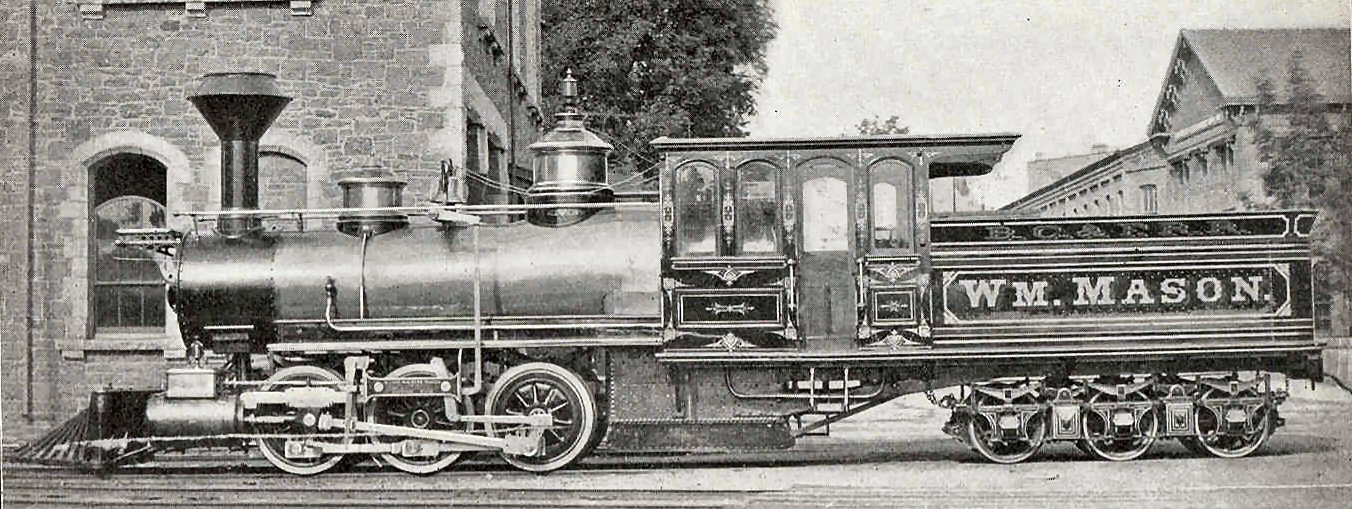
- Mason Bogie Single Fairlie, 1874
Equivalent classifications
- UIC class: C3, C3'
- French class: 033
- Turkish class: 36
- Swiss class: 3/6
- Russian class: 0-3-3
First known tank engine version
- First use: 1874
- Country: United States
- Locomotive: Wm. Mason
- Railway: New Bedford Railroad
- Designer: William Mason
- Builder: Mason Machine Works
- Evolved to: 2-6-6T

Under the Whyte notation for the classification of steam locomotives, 0-6-6 represents the wheel arrangement of no leading wheels, six powered and coupled driving wheels on three axles and six trailing wheels on three axles.

== Overview ==
All locomotives with this wheel arrangement were tank locomotives; no 0-6-6 tender locomotives were recorded.

The 0-6-6 wheel arrangement was usually found on Single Fairlie or Mason Bogie locomotives. The Fairlie locomotive was invented and patented in 1864 by the Scottish engineer Robert Francis Fairlie. The first Fairlie locomotives later became known as Double Fairlies.

A variation of the original Fairlie concept was the Single Fairlie, also known as the Mason Fairlie. The Single Fairlie design was essentially half a Double Fairlie. It retained the ability to negotiate sharp curves and, while it abandoned the bidirectional nature of the Double Fairlie, it regained the ability of conventional locomotives to have a large water and coal bunker behind the cab and to use a trailing tender if necessary.

Most Single Fairlies were tank locomotives and early models were similar in general appearance to conventional tank engines with side tanks and a coal bunker aft of the cab, all mounted on a single rigid frame. The pivoting engine unit was mounted under the boiler and the unpowered bogie under the cab and bunker.

Later models were similar in appearance to conventional tender locomotives. It was developed by William Mason in the United States, where the type became known as the Mason Bogie. It had one boiler at the front, a cab in the centre and a water-and-coal bunker at the rear end, all mounted on a single rigid frame, with a single engine unit under the boiler and an unpowered bogie under the bunker.

== Usage ==
=== United States ===
The first known 0-6-6T locomotive was built for the 3 ft (914 mm) gauge New Bedford Railroad by Mason Machine Works in May 1874. It was apparently not numbered, but bore the name Wm. Mason. The locomotive later went to the Boston, Clinton & Fitchburg as its no. 23, then to the Old Colony as its no. 108 and finally to the New York, New Haven & Hartford as its no. 708.

More 0-6-6T locomotives were produced by Mason between 1875 and 1881. Many of them were subsequently rebuilt to a 2-6-6T wheel arrangement.
