= Carter Brothers =

American railroad car manufacturer

- Industry: Manufacturer of railway equipment
- Founded: 1872; 154 years ago
- Fate: closed 1902; 124 years ago
- Headquarters: San Francisco
- Key people: Thomas Carter and Martin Carter
- Products: railroad cars

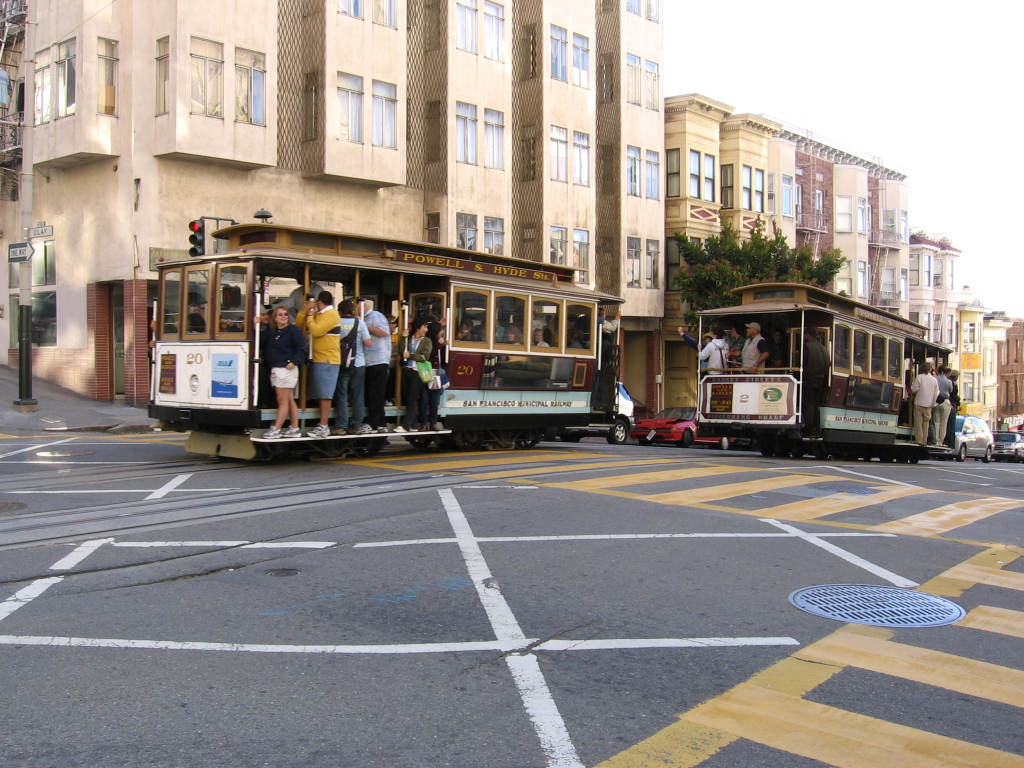
Two Carter Brothers cable cars on San Francisco's Powell Street line

Carter Brothers was a manufacturer of railroad cars in northern California during the late 19th century. The firm was founded in 1872 by two Irish carriage-makers who moved to California during the American Civil War. Their cars built more than a century earlier were used into the 21st century on the San Francisco cable car system and the White Pass and Yukon Route.

== Thomas Carter ==
Thomas Carter was born in Ireland, and immigrated to the United States to work as a carriage-maker in western New York. He arrived in California via Panama in 1862 to become shop foreman of the Sacramento Valley Railroad. Thomas moved to Portland, Oregon in 1869 to build cars for the railroad to Oregon City.

== Martin Carter ==
Thomas' brother Martin Carter worked as a carriage-maker for the Clark Carriage Factory across the Canada–United States border in Toronto. Martin came to California in 1863 joining his brother working for the Sacramento Valley Railroad while their railroad shops were building horse-drawn street cars for the Market Street car line. When his brother left for Oregon, Martin applied his carpentry skills to building stairs for the California State Capitol and similarly grand buildings of Sacramento.

== History ==
The two brothers moved to Sausalito, California in 1872 where they established a factory manufacturing cars for the San Francisco and North Pacific Railroad and the North Pacific Coast Railroad. A smaller factory in Monterey, California built cars for the Santa Cruz Railroad and the Monterey and Salinas Valley Railroad from Monterey to Salinas, California. Their partnership also contracted for construction of bridges on these railroads, and in 1876 moved their car factory to Newark, California to build over 700 cars for the South Pacific Coast Railroad of which Thomas Carter was the chief engineer and superintendent of construction.

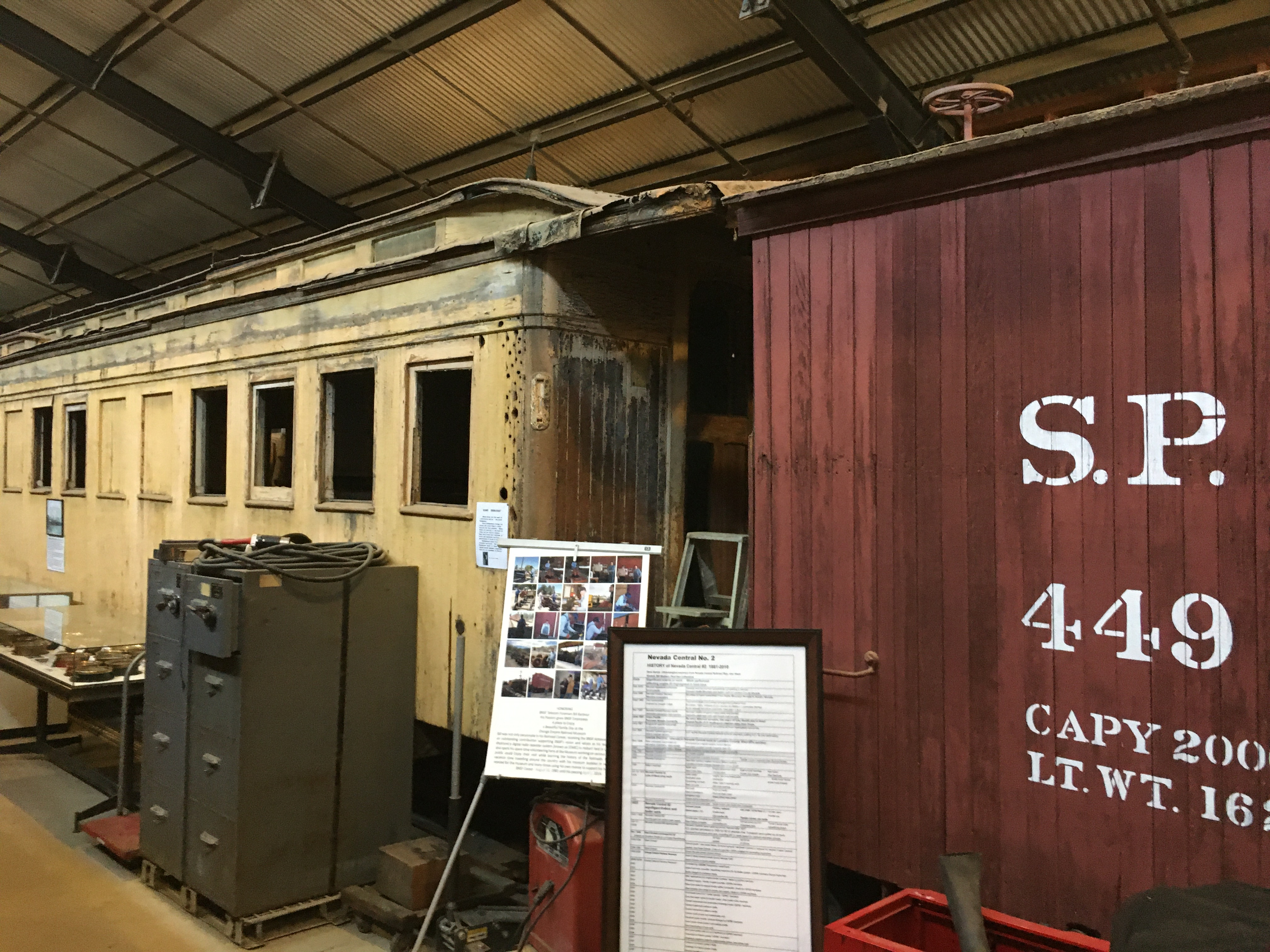
Southern Pacific Coach #39, at the Southern California Railway Museum. It was built by Carter Brothers in 1881 at their Newark shop for the South Pacific Coast Railroad, which was bought by the Southern Pacific in 1887. It was converted into housing for SP railroad workers in 1909. In the mid-1930s it was assigned to track worker Victor S. Martinez, in San Miguel, California. Seven Martinez children were born in this car. When he retired in 1957, he bought the car and moved it to his own property in San Miguel.

Carter Brothers offered very competitive prices using local materials to minimize transportation costs. Most cars were expertly assembled from Douglas fir and redwood lumber. Iron castings were made by foundries in San Francisco, Newark, Vallejo, and Santa Cruz; but the company used only higher quality eastern wheels from Whitney or Taylor. While most of the company production was boxcars and flatcars, they built a broad variety of passenger cars including a private railroad car for Kalākaua, king of the Hawaiian Islands.

Martin Carter supervised the Newark car shop while Thomas was the company business manager from offices in San Francisco. The company specialized in construction of narrow-gauge railway cars, and patented a passenger car bogie especially suitable for such cars. Another company patent for a specialized forest railway disconnected log bunk bogie brought equipment orders from many early logging railroads of the Pacific coast. Car manufacture ceased in 1897 after building an estimated five-thousand cars for California and locations as distant as Alaska, Oregon, Mexico, Guatemala, El Salvador, Hawaii, and Brazil. Thomas died in 1898, and the company officially closed when Martin retired in 1902, but the Newark shop produced a few more parts until the 1906 San Francisco earthquake.

== Legacy ==
The Society for the Preservation of Carter Railroad Resources operates a railroad museum in Ardenwood Historic Farm Regional Park, Fremont, California, including 1.25 miles (2.01 km) of 3 ft (914 mm) narrow gauge track and the society's collection of Carter Brother's rolling stock.
