= 2-6-6T =

Locomotive wheel arrangement

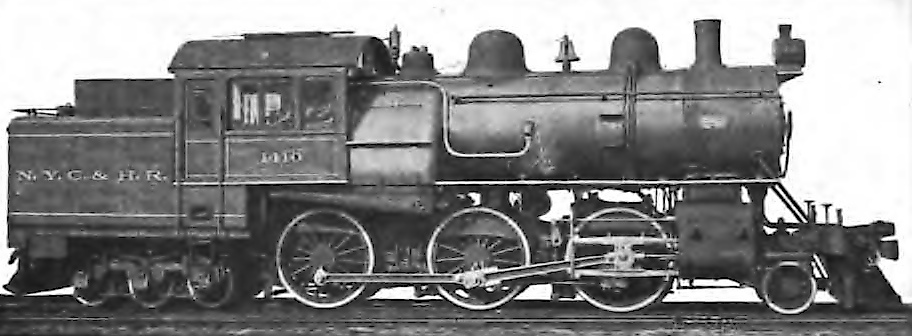
ALCO-built 2-6-6 suburban tank locomotive of the New York Central and Hudson River Railroad.

In the Whyte notation for describing steam locomotive wheel arrangement, a 2-6-6 is a locomotive with a two-wheeled leading truck, six driving wheels, and a six-wheeled trailing truck. All the locomotives produced of this arrangement have been tank locomotives, and the vast majority in the United States. It was a popular arrangement for the larger Mason Bogies, as well as some of the largest suburban tank locomotives.

The locomotive was mostly used in the Denver, South Park and Pacific Railroad. It also saw usage in New York and Chicago.

== Equivalent classifications ==
Other equivalent classifications are:

- UIC classification: 1C3 (also known as German classification and Italian classification)
- French classification: 133
- Turkish classification: 37
- Swiss classification: 3/7
