= Ardenwood Historic Farm =

Historic house in California, United States

- George Washington Patterson Ranch--Ardenwood
- U.S. National Register of Historic Places
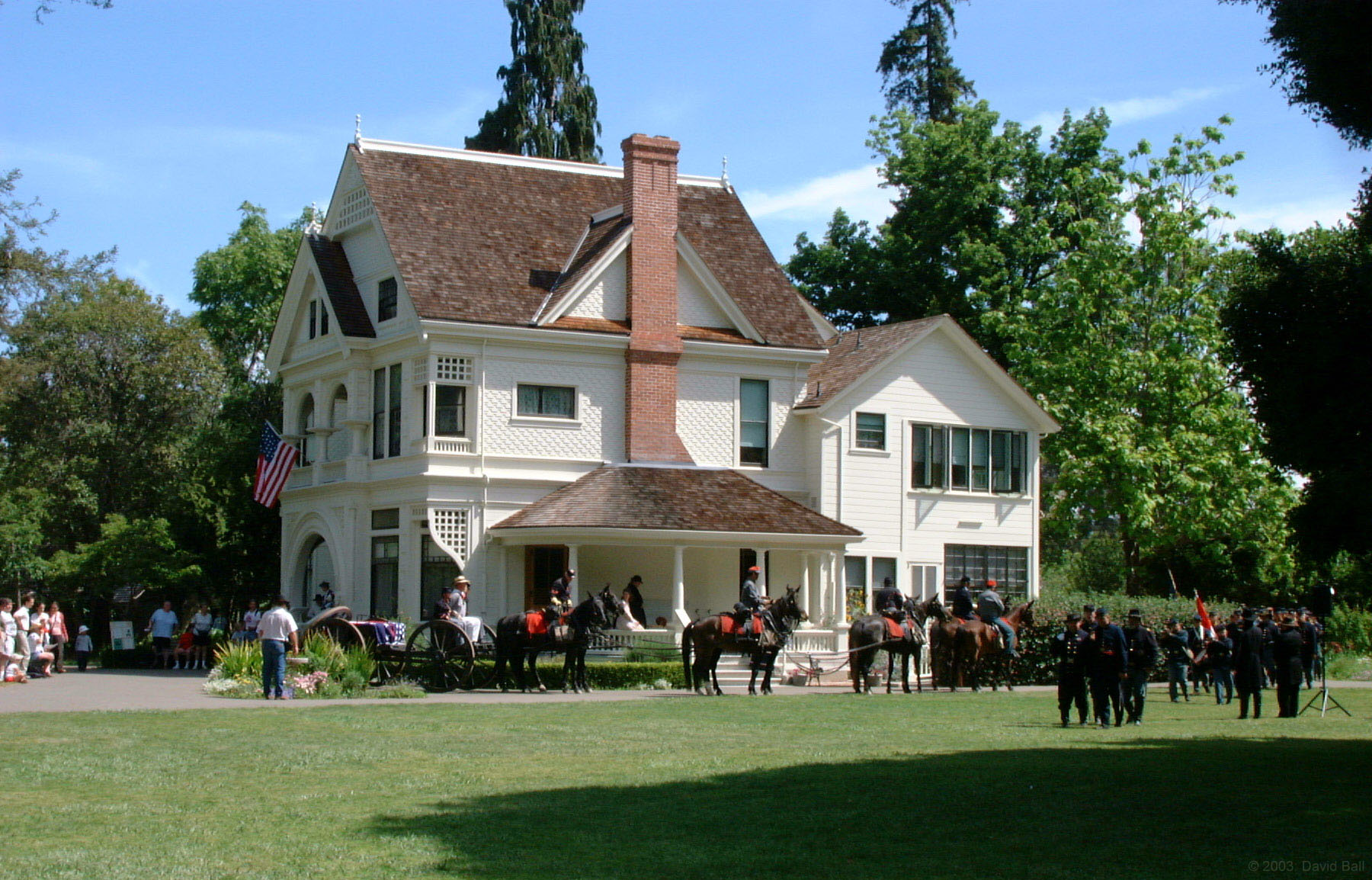
- Patterson House during a Civil War demonstration (2003)

- Location within San Francisco Bay Area Location within California Location within the United States
- Location: 34600 Newark Blvd. Fremont, California
- Coordinates: 37°33′29″N 122°02′58″W
- Architects: George Washington Patterson, James Hawley
- Architectural style: Queen Anne
- NRHP reference No.: 85003043
- Added to NRHP: November 29, 1985

Ardenwood Historic Farm is a Regional Historic Landmark in Fremont, California. It is managed by the East Bay Regional Park District. The Ardenwood Historic Farm consists of the Ardenwood Station, the former Ohlone village and burial site, a blacksmith shop, an area with farm animals, Patterson House, and a gazebo. The Ardenwood Farm today is a working farm, producing grain and vegetables.

== History ==
Officially opened to the public on July 28, 1985, the entire park includes a farm, a large forest and a mansion now called the Patterson House. Patterson called his estate "Ardenwood", after the forested area in England mentioned in Shakespeare's play, As You Like It.

=== Patterson House ===
George W. Patterson was born in Pennsylvania in 1822 and came to California as a forty-niner during the California Gold Rush. He came to Alameda County in 1851, after not having success in mining. The Patterson House (also known as the George W. Patterson House) was first constructed as a humble farm house in 1857 by the original owner, George Washington Patterson and his neighbor James Hawley. The original house was a two-story farmhouse built in redwood and having a rectangular floor plan and a gable roof. The original structure is now seen as the dining room, smoking room, pantry, half bath, and two upstairs bedrooms and a full bathroom.

There were two subsequent additions to the house. In sometimes around c.1883–1889, a Queen Anne style addition designed by noted architect Samuel Newsom, and funded by Patterson and his wife Clara. During the c.1883–1889 renovation they extended the size of the house and enclosed the porch to the south for a full two stories and the house size was doubled.

The second addition came in c.1910–1915 when Patterson's son Henry and his wife Sarah remodeled with the construction of a two-story wood-framed addition containing a kitchen and upper floor bedroom.

A portrait painting of a woman was found in the attic of the Patterson House, it is thought to be by artist John Koch of a relative of the Patterson family, May Morgan.

=== Ardenwood Station ===
A feature of the park is the Railroad Museum at Ardenwood which operates a 3 ft (914 mm) narrow gauge railroad, which is a recreation of a historic local branch of the South Pacific Coast Railroad. The museum has a collection of narrow gauge railroad cars and other artifacts of 19th-century railroading. The museum is run by the Society for the Preservation of Carter Railroad Resources.

=== Farm ===
The local area was in agricultural usage beginning sometime in the 1850s. The Ardenwood Farm locale was characterized first for its use as grazing land and dairy production, and gradually became increasingly dedicated to wheat and vegetable production. At the time of Patterson's death in 1895, the ranch was 3,000 acres, one of the largest in the area.

A review of available aerial photographs by Earth Metrics reveals that the area immediately to the south was used for agricultural purposes from at least 1960 until some time in the late 1970s cultivated with a grain crop. No discrete rows are visible in the aerial photographs of that time. The Alameda family was a prominent occupant in the area for much of the period of agricultural land use. Mel Alameda of The Alameda Company confirmed to Earth Metrics that while cauliflower has been the dominant historic crop for the area, hay and grazing were the primary use later and until the late 1970s. Based on the lack of visible rows on the aerial photos, it is most probable that the area to the south was used for hay production rather than cauliflower.

== Holidays and events ==
The park has hosted many events, a Celtic festival, an Independence Day celebration, a Renaissance Faire in September, The Harvest Festival, annual Rail Fair, pumpkin patch in October, and Halloween celebrations, including a haunted railroad. Among other crops, in the fall the farm harvests a large pumpkin patch.

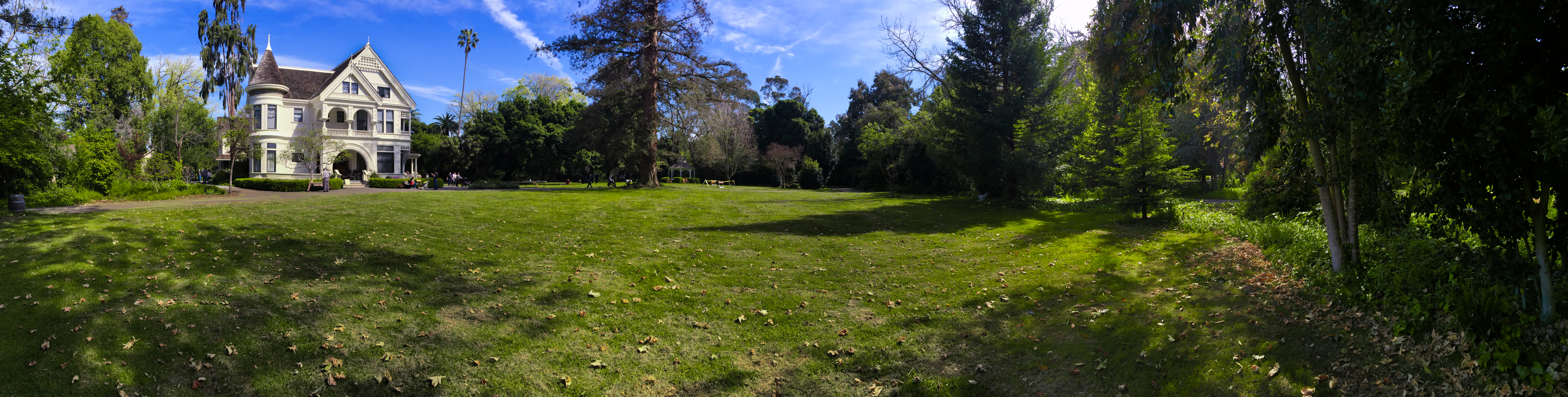
Panorama of the Patterson House on the Ardenwood Historic Farm property in Fremont, California.

== Gallery ==
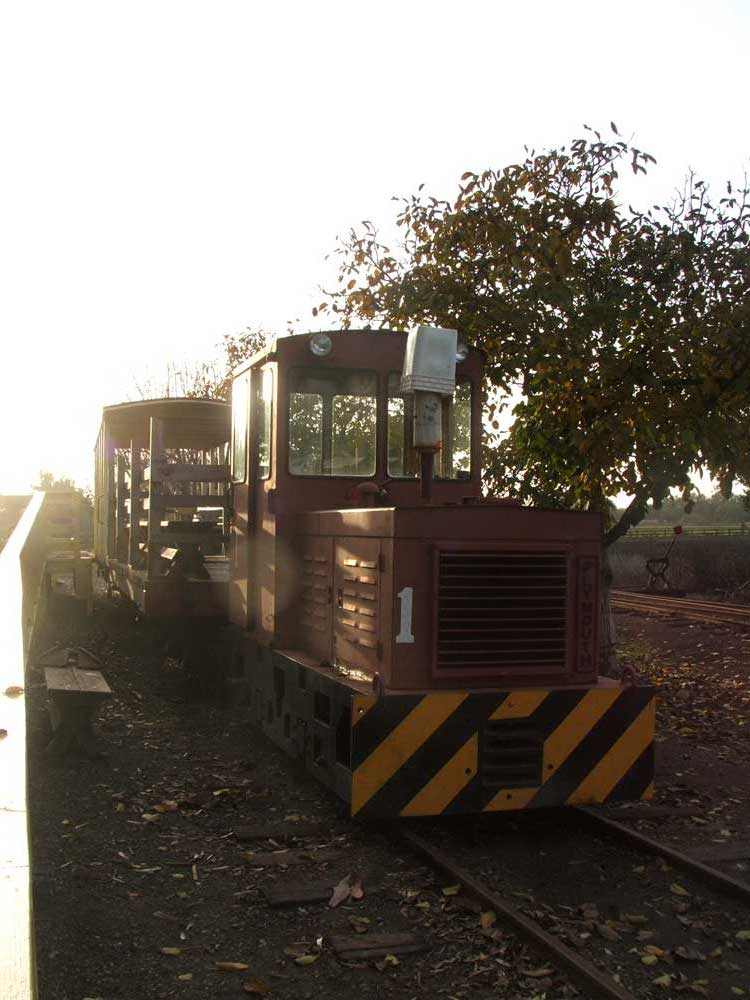
The railway.

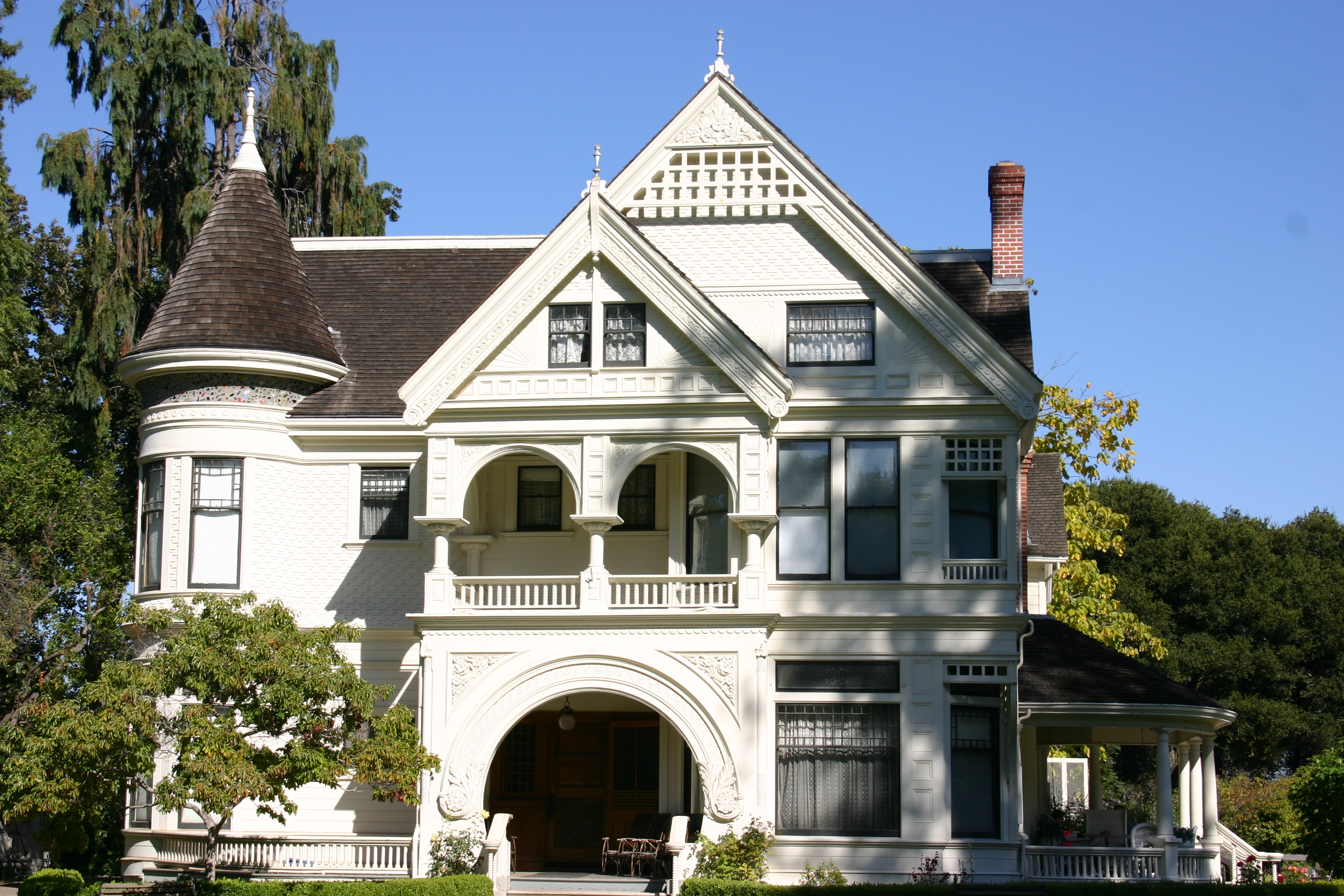
Patterson House (2012)
