= William Mason (locomotive) =

Steam locomotive

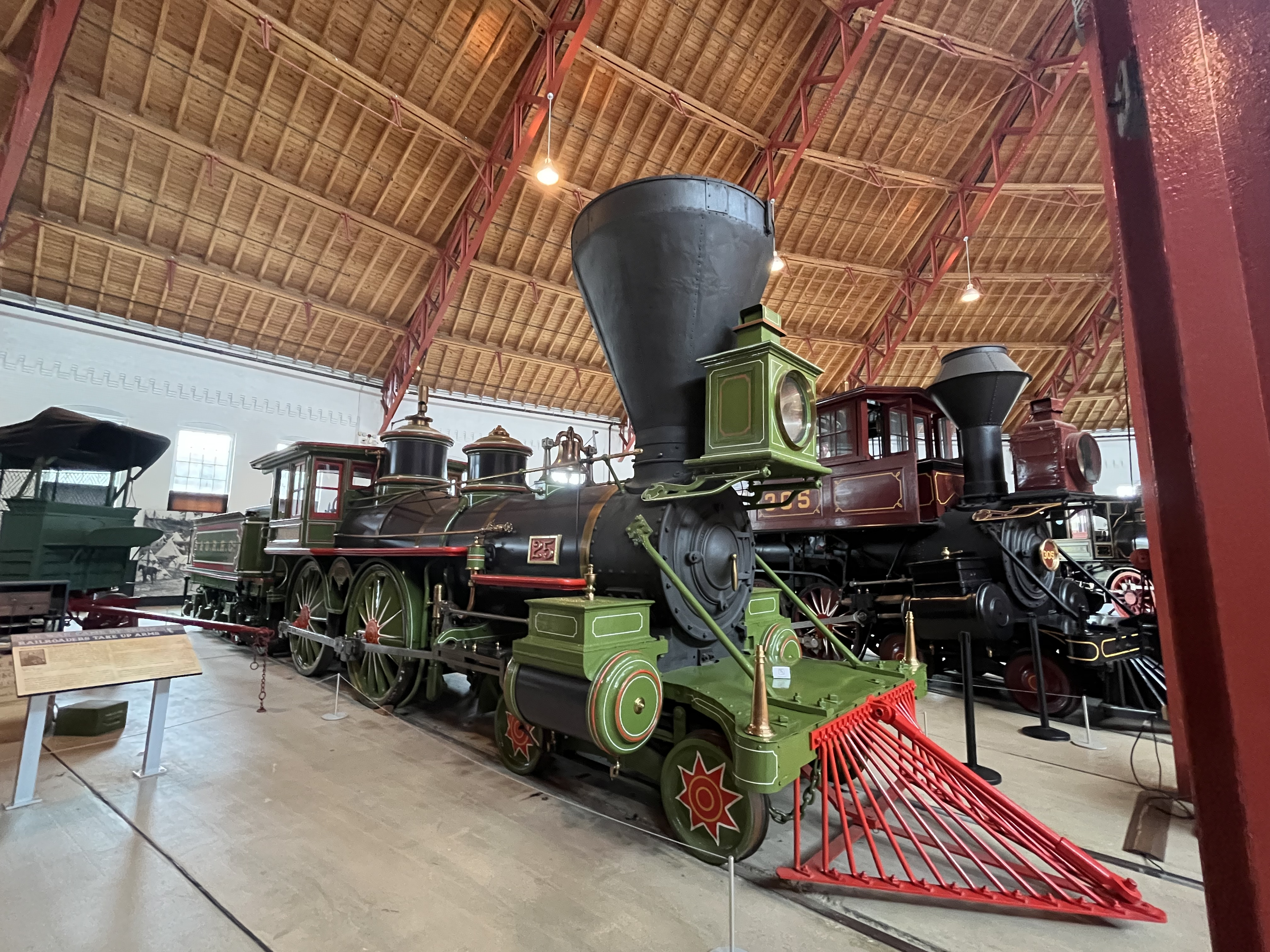
- Baltimore and Ohio number 25 in the National Museum of Railroad History & Innovation.
Type and origin
- Power type: Steam
- Builder: Mason Machine Works
- Serial number: 46
- Build date: August 1856
Specifications
- Configuration
  - Whyte: 4-4-0
  - UIC: 2′B n
- Gauge: 4 ft 8 1/2 in (1,435 mm)
- Driver dia.: 60 in (1,524 mm)
- Adhesive weight: 40,500 lb (18.4 tonnes)
- Loco weight: 56,000 lb (25.4 tonnes)
- Fuel type: Wood
- Boiler pressure: 75 lbf/in^{2} (517 kPa)
- Cylinders: Two, outside
- Cylinder size: 15 in × 22 in (381 mm × 559 mm)
- Valve gear: Stephenson
- Valve type: Slide valves
Performance figures
- Tractive effort: 6,225 lbf (27.69 kN)
Career
- Operators: Baltimore and Ohio Railroad
- Class: F
- Numbers: 25 (second), renumbered 55 in 1882
- Official name: William Mason
- First run: November 1856
- Retired: 1892 (revenue service), 1957 (exhibition and movie operations), October 2014 (museum operations)
- Restored: 1927 (exhibition and movie operations), 1998 (movie and museum operations), September 2017 (cosmetic)
- Current owner: National Museum of Railroad History & Innovation
- Disposition: On static display

William Mason is a 4-4-0 steam locomotive currently on display at the National Museum of Railroad History & Innovation in Baltimore, Maryland, United States. It was built for the Baltimore and Ohio Railroad and given the number 25. The locomotive is named in honor of its builder, William Mason, who built around 754 steam locomotives at his Mason Machine Works firm in Taunton, Massachusetts, from 1853 until his death in 1883. The locomotive had been one of the oldest operable examples of the American Standard design, and is the fourth oldest Baltimore and Ohio locomotive in existence, the oldest being 0-4-0 No. 2, the Andrew Jackson from 1836, and the second oldest being 0-4-0 No. 8 tied with John Hancock built later that same year, and the third being the 0-8-0 No. 57, Memnon of 1848 (The preserved Tom Thumb and Lafayette locomotives are replicas built by the road for exhibition purposes in 1926 and 1927, respectively). While operable, William Mason had been one of the oldest operational locomotives in the world, and the oldest in the western hemisphere.

== History and career ==
The locomotive was built by William Mason for the Baltimore and Ohio in 1856, most likely for passenger service. The locomotive, while not given a name (the railroad had ended the practice of naming locomotives at the time it was built), was the railroad's second locomotive to be numbered 25, replacing an earlier 4-4-0 of that number built by William Norris in 1839. Among the locomotive's notable features is the "three-point suspension," where unlike most earlier locomotives (i.e. the road's Lafayette), which the front bogie has its wheels closely spaced, No. 25's bogie had its wheels spread apart, with the cylinder mounted horizontally between them. While the locomotive was not the first to have this design, it represented a major improvement in locomotive design which would come to define the "American Standard" locomotive. Another similarly revolutionary design was the locomotive's smokebox. Unlike earlier designs, such as that of the General, built a year earlier, No. 25 had its smokebox sitting on a "saddle" which carried the cylinders. This design further lowered the locomotive's center of gravity and made re-boilering easier. It was the railroad's first locomotive to have this smokebox design, as well as the road's first locomotive to have Stephenson link motion valve gear.

== Retirement and exhibition ==
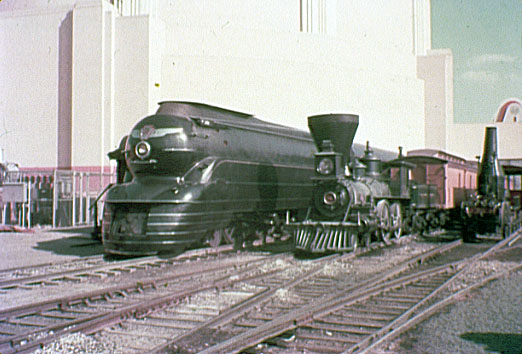
William Mason on display between Best Friend of Charleston and a Pennsylvania Railroad K4 streamliner at the 1939 New York World's Fair

No. 25 served on the Baltimore and Ohio for nearly forty years. The locomotive is one of the locomotives that pulled the train which carried Abraham Lincoln from Springfield, Illinois, to Washington, D.C., for his inauguration in 1861. It was renumbered to 55 in 1882 and was retired in 1892 when it was placed in storage. Fortunately, the Baltimore and Ohio had greatly favored its locomotives, and preserved its best examples, including No. 25. The locomotive was displayed at the Chicago's World Fair of 1893, then at the St. Louis Exposition of 1904. In 1927, No. 25 was given the name William Mason in honor of its builder, and was exhibited at the railroad's own Fair of the Iron Horse, then at the 1939 New York World's Fair, and finally in 1948 at the Chicago Railroad Fair. During 1951, the locomotive was loaned to the Erie Railroad, operating as a traveling exhibit as part of the railroad's centennial celebration. When out of exhibition, it remained in storage until 1953.

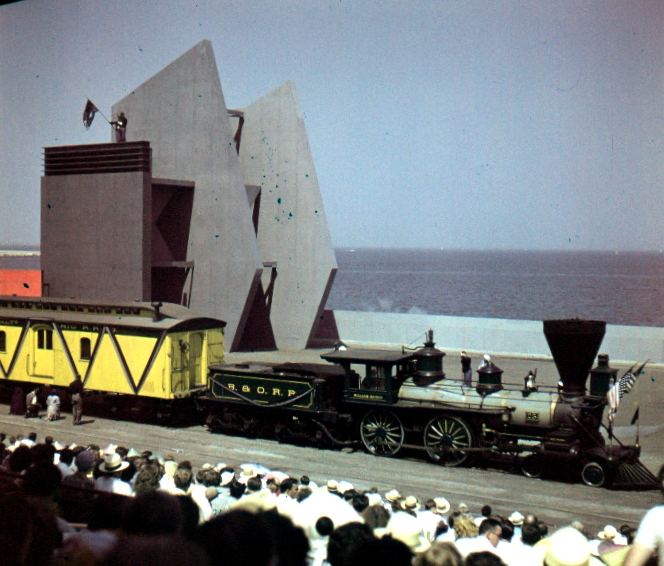
William Mason operating at the Chicago Railroad Fair.

== William Mason in film ==
In 1953, the locomotive was placed on display in the newly opened Baltimore and Ohio Transportation Museum, occasionally operating in movies, including The Great Locomotive Chase in 1956, followed by Raintree County a year later. After these performances it returned to static display at the museum, remaining as such until 1998, when it was restored once more to operating condition for use in the movie, Wild Wild West. After that, it continued to appear in films such as Tuck Everlasting and Gods and Generals. In February 2003, the roof of the National Museum of Railroad History & Innovation's roundhouse, where the William Mason was usually displayed, had collapsed from a major snowstorm. While many locomotives and rolling stock sustained considerable damage from the collapse, the William Mason was not in the roundhouse at the time, having been removed for inspection by the Federal Railroad Administration, and thus escaped damage.

== Current status ==
In November 2004, after the roundhouse was rebuilt, the museum reopened, with the William Mason returning to display in the roundhouse shortly thereafter. The museum operated the William Mason on select weekends in October until 2014 - after which the locomotive was taken out of service for its 1,472-day inspection. During the inspection, it was found that the locomotive's firebox crown sheet would have to be replaced for the locomotive to continue to operate, the cost of which exceeded the budget allocated for the locomotive's restoration. Thus, the museum instead opted for a cosmetic restoration, with the locomotive receiving a new livery of green (a different shade from that worn post-1999) with red and gold lining. This livery, based on the layers of paint uncovered from the locomotive during restoration, is believed to be closer to that originally worn by the locomotive. The restored locomotive was returned to display in the roundhouse in September, 2017.
