= Duncans Mills, California =

Unincorporated community in California, United States

Duncans Mills, California Duncanville
- Unincorporated community
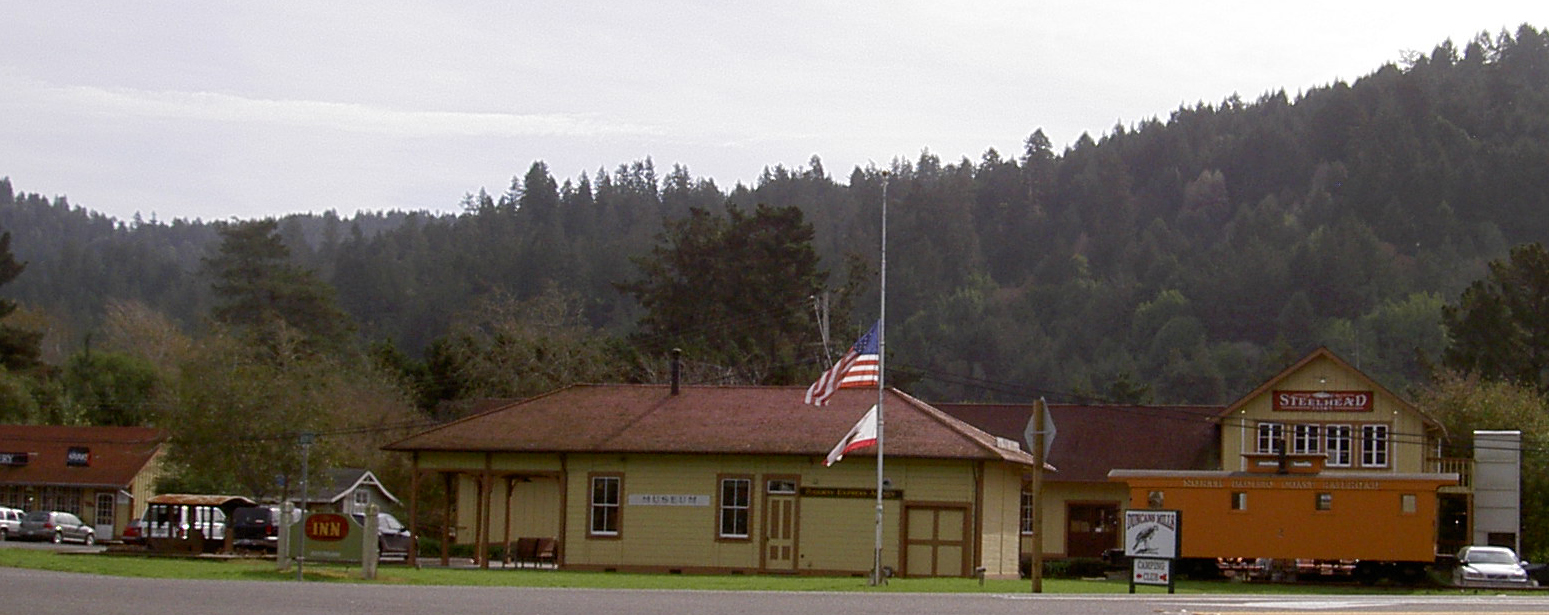
- Duncans Mills museum

- Location within the state of California
- Coordinates: 38°27′14″N 123°3′18″W
- Country: United States
- State: California
- County: Sonoma
- Elevation: 35 ft (11 m)

Population (2000)
  - Total: 85
- Time zone: UTC-8 (PST)
  - Summer (DST): UTC-7 (PDT)
- ZIP code: 95430
- Area code: 707
- FIPS code: 06-20130
- GNIS feature ID: 222722

Duncans Mills (or Duncan's Mills) is an unincorporated community located in Sonoma County, California, United States.

== History ==
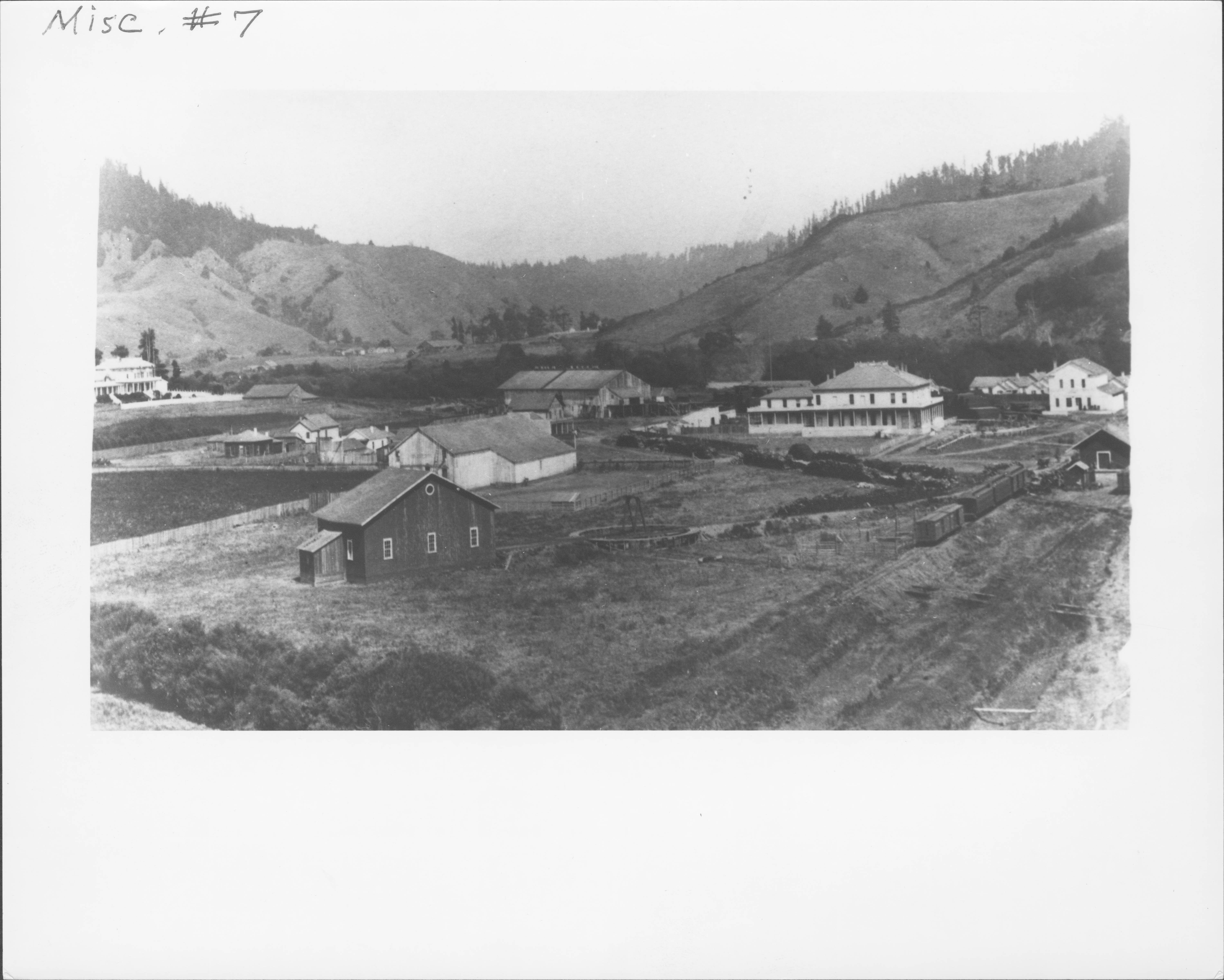
Duncans Mills, 1877

Duncans Mills was once part of the Rancho Muniz Mexican land grant.

In 1877, Alexander Duncan established a sawmill in what is today Duncans Mills. The mills sent lumber to the growing city of San Francisco.

The town was founded in the 1870s. It featured two hotels, a general store, a saloon, a meat market, blacksmith, livery stable, and a notion shop.

Starting in the 1870s, the narrow-gauge North Pacific Coast Railroad ran through Duncans Mills on its way from Cazadero, California, to Sausalito. After being sold several times, the railroad ceased operation in the 1930s. The town slowly faded, until a 1976 restoration project, associated with the celebration of the U.S. Bicentennial, brought about a period of building restoration and business re-vitalization.

Today, Duncans Mills resembles the way it was originally built. It has an authentic North Pacific Coast Railroad Depot and several original cars from the old railroad line. A California State Park Sector Office is located in a building constructed to look like an original fixture of the town, but was actually part of the 1976 revitalization. The Blue Heron Restaurant has served as the destination entertainment center of the town for decades.

== Geography ==
Duncans Mills is located on the Russian River about 4 mi (6 km) from the Pacific Ocean. It straddles State Route 116.

=== Climate ===
Climate data for Duncans Mills, California
Month	Jan	Feb	Mar	Apr	May	Jun	Jul	Aug	Sep	Oct	Nov	Dec	Year
Mean daily maximum °F (°C)	57 (14)	62 (17)	65 (18)	70 (21)	76 (24)	81 (27)	84 (29)	84 (29)	82 (28)	77 (25)	66 (19)	57 (14)	72 (22)
Mean daily minimum °F (°C)	36 (2)	38 (3)	40 (4)	41 (5)	45 (7)	48 (9)	49 (9)	49 (9)	48 (9)	43 (6)	38 (3)	34 (1)	42 (6)
Average precipitation inches (mm)	8.65 (220)	7.64 (194)	6.15 (156)	2.25 (57)	1.03 (26)	0.25 (6.4)	0.08 (2.0)	0.11 (2.8)	0.52 (13)	2.01 (51)	5.85 (149)	6.29 (160)	40.83 (1,037.2)

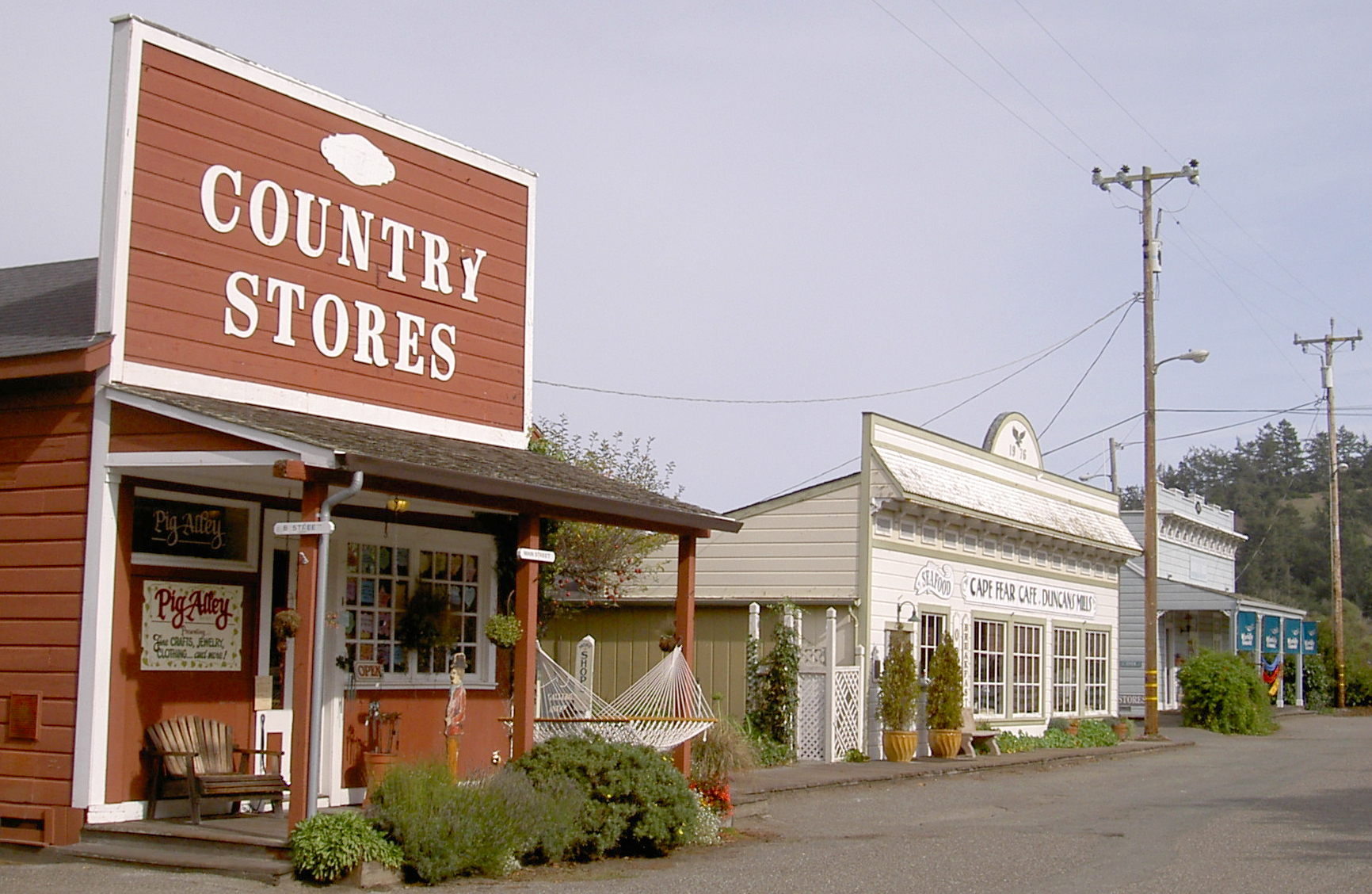
Duncans Mills

The record high was 113 °F (45 °C) on July 14, 1972, and the record low was 14 °F (−10 °C) on December 23, 1990.

== Demographics ==
According to the 2000 census, about 175 people live in Duncans Mills. There are around 42 family households and 31 non-family households. Each household has an average of 2–3 people. In Duncans Mills, there are 129 houses; 56 of them are vacant and 52 of them are of seasonal, recreational, or occasional use.
