= Mason Machine Works =

Machine Manufacturing Industry in Massachusetts, United States of America

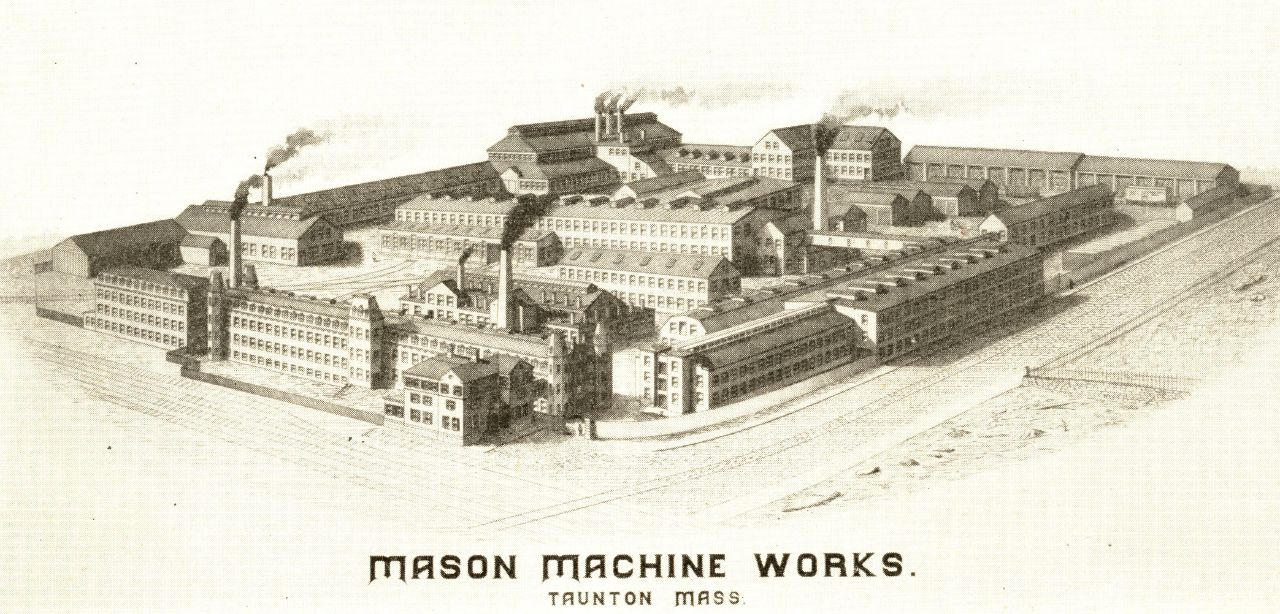
Mason Machine Works, ca.1898

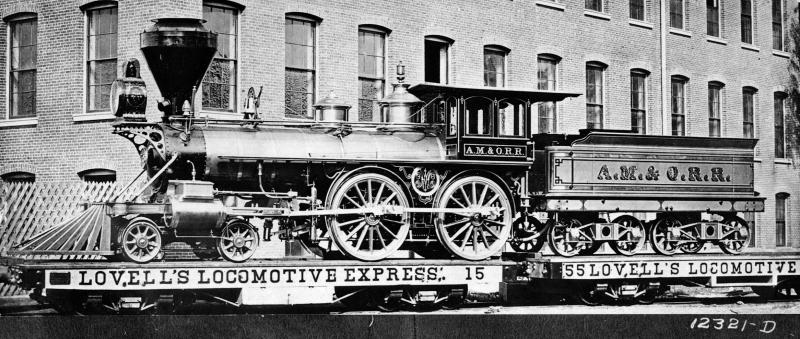
A Mason Locomotive

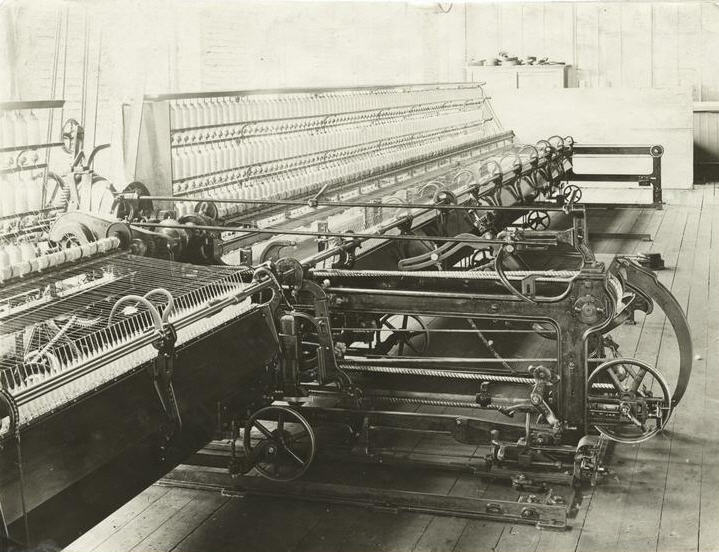
A Mason self-acting mule, ca.1898

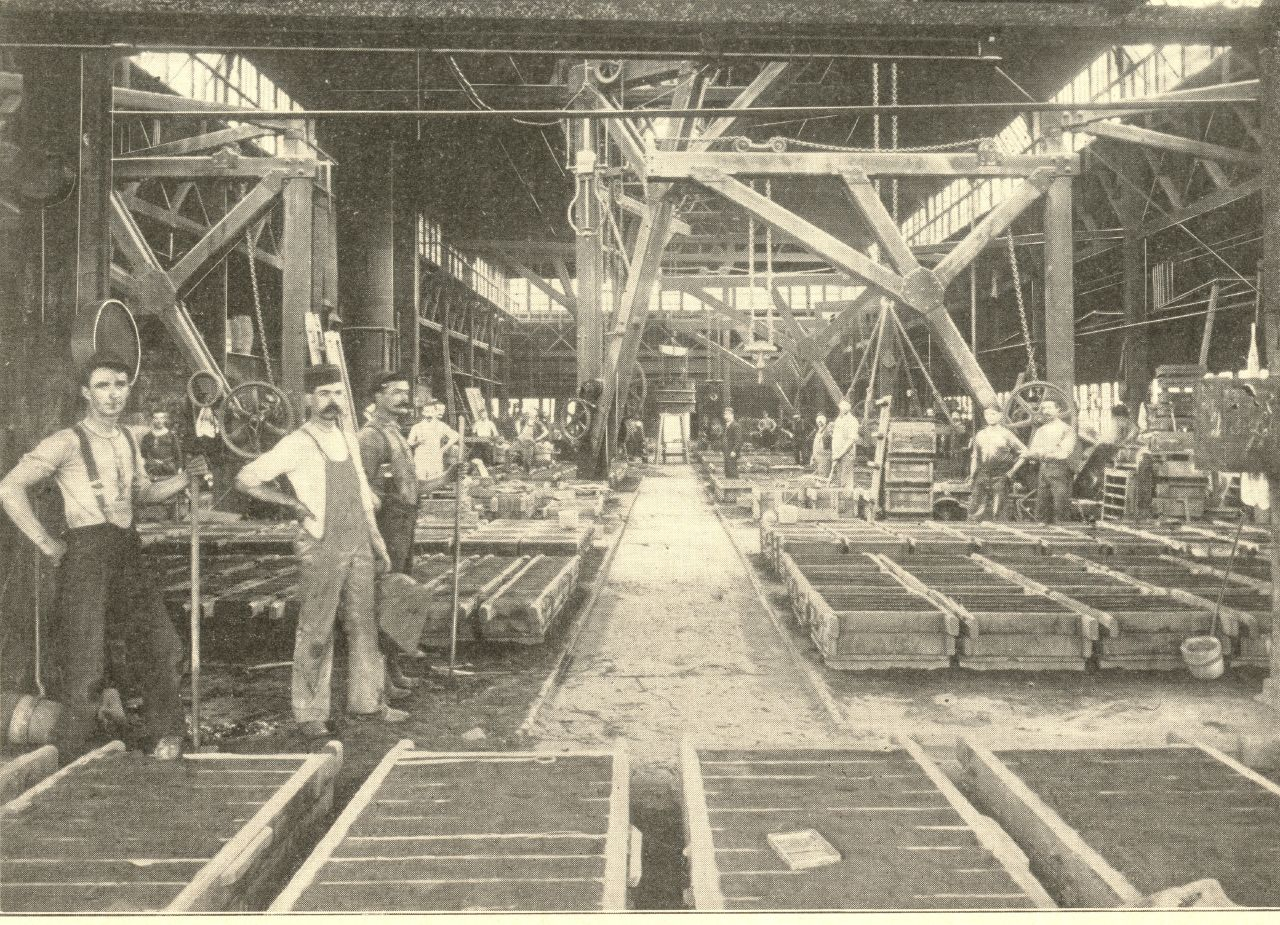
View of the foundry, Mason Machine Works, 1898

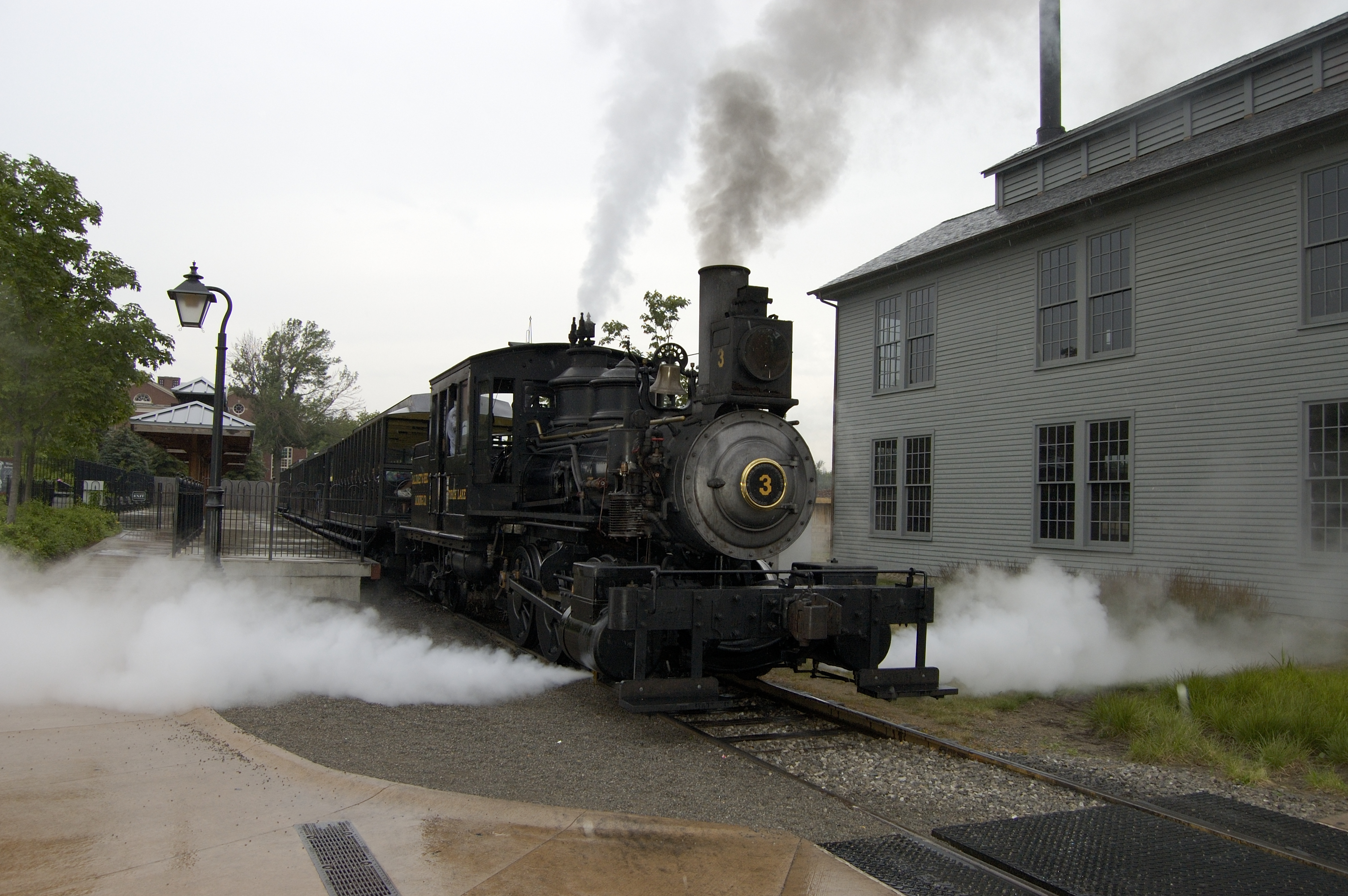
Hecla & Torch Lake Railroad Number 3, a Mason Bogie locomotive operating at Greenfield Village.

The Mason Machine Works was a machinery manufacturing company located in Taunton, Massachusetts, between 1845 and 1944. The company became famous for an early invention by its creator, William Mason, the self-acting mule, first patented in 1840. The company also later produced locomotives, rifles during the American Civil War, and later printing presses. However, the production of textile machinery would remain the company's core business during the late 19th century, until its decline in the 1920s.

== Origins ==
The son of a blacksmith born in 1808 at Mystic, Connecticut, William Mason became a skilled master mechanic while still in his teens, working for various companies in the Killingly, Connecticut, area that were involved with machinery for the growing textile industry.

In 1835, Mason moved to Taunton, Massachusetts, to work for Crocker and Richmond, a company that made ring spinning frames for the cotton textile industry. While the firm failed in the financial crisis of 1837, it was soon taken over by Leach and Keith. Mason was made foreman.

== Textile Machinery ==
By the time William Mason began his career, there had been a growing industry of machine building in the United States. It was a specialized art requiring tools, materials, skills and designs that had been gradually increasing through the early part of the 19th century. The ideas of early pioneers in the textile machine industry such as David Wilkinson at Pawtucket, Rhode Island, and Paul Moody at Waltham, Massachusetts, were constantly being tinkered with and improved upon during this time.

On October 8, 1840, Mason's greatest invention, the "self-acting mule" was patented. Competition required improvements and on October 3, 1846, he received a patent for "Mason's Self-acting Mule." The self-acting mule was a triumph of automation. This device would become the industry standard for years to come.

With the failure of Leach and Keith in 1842, William Mason convinced investors to help him establish his own company, the Mason Machine Works. In 1845, new buildings were erected and the plant became the largest one devoted to the manufacture of machinery in the country. It made cotton machinery, woolen machinery, machinists' tools, blowers, cupola furnaces, gearing, shafting, and railroad car wheels made with spokes.

The Mason Machine Works would become most important company in Taunton, Massachusetts, for much of the 19th century.

== Locomotives ==
After 1852, the company expanded again, venturing into the locomotive business. Mason's innovative locomotive designs quickly drew praise from railroad engineers and operators, and were known to be the easiest engines to repair. His ideas and improvements would later be adopted by other locomotive builders.

The company would construct 754 steam locomotives between 1853 and 1889. However, after William Mason's death in 1883, the firm would mostly concentrate on its core business of textile machinery.

Two locomotives built by Mason have been preserved, one of which is operational. One is the Baltimore and Ohio Railroad's number 25, a 4-4-0 type engine built in 1856, which was later named in honor of Mason. It is currently at the Baltimore and Ohio Railroad Museum. The other, operating locomotive is Hecla & Torch Lake Railroad Number 3, a 0-6-4 engine of the Mason Bogie design built in 1873, currently at the Henry Ford Museum.

Also preserved is the tender that originally belonged to the Dalton locomotive, which the firm had built in 1864 for the United States Military Railroad. After the Civil War ended, the engine was sold, becoming the Western and Atlantic Railroad's William MacRae. When the engine was retired in 1890, its tender was salvaged and paired with the railroad's famed Texas locomotive, which had been built by Danforth, Cooke and Company.

== Civil War Rifles and Printing Presses ==
In 1861, with the start of the Civil War, Mason accepted a contract from the United States Government for the production of 100,000 Springfield model rifles. The company embarked on a large expansion to handle the new contract. However, the War Department eventually decided to cut the contract to only 30,000 rifles.

After the war, the company again focused on producing high-quality textile machinery and locomotives. The factory expanded to more than 10 acres (40,000 m^{2}) near the western end of downtown Taunton.

In 1879, Mason's reputation for quality workmanship let to a contract to manufacture of the Campbell printing press, originally patented and built in Brooklyn, New York.

== Decline and legacy ==
With the demise of the northern textile industry during the 1920s, Mason was reduced to producing mostly spare parts for the machines which it had sold previously to an ever-decreasing number of textile manufacturers. By the 1930s, portions of the site were occupied by Grossman's Lumber Company and the Southern New England Terminals trucking company.

The Mason Machine Works finally went out of business in 1944.

Grossman's continued to occupy much of the former Mason property until the late 1960s, when the property became earmarked for demolition by the City of Taunton, as part of an urban renewal project. The site was vacated by October 1969.

However, with demolition slated to begin, the complex was destroyed by fire on December 30, 1970.

Today the site is occupied by a bus depot and garage, an apartment building and other businesses. A portion of the site remains open and has not been redeveloped, due to likely soil contamination issues associated with the Machine Works operations.

== See also ==
- Mason Bogie
- Draper Corporation
- Paul Moody
- Spinning mule
- Taunton Locomotive Manufacturing Company
- Whitin Machine Works
