= Society for the Preservation of Carter Railroad Resources =

Railroad museum in Fremont, California

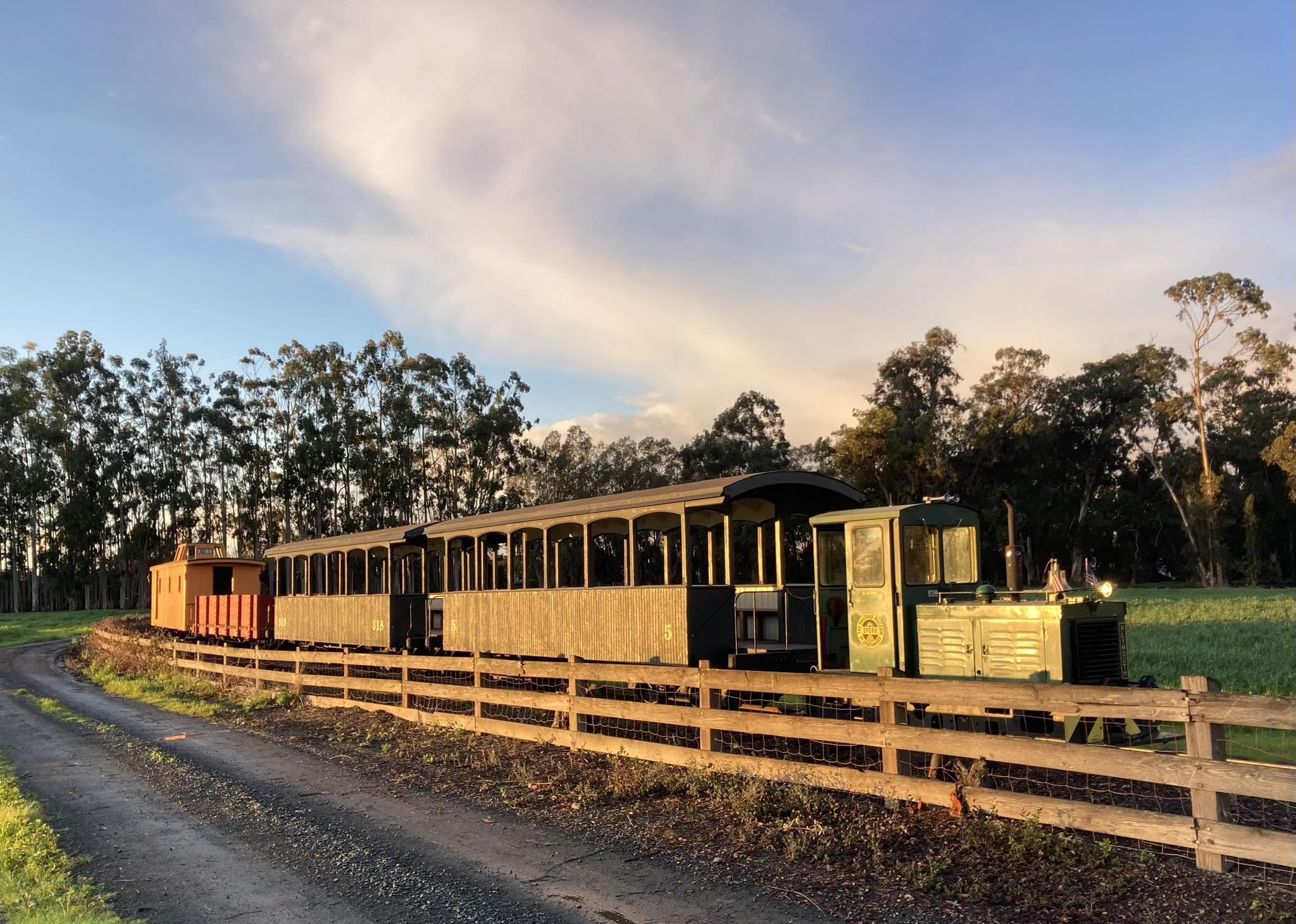

Overview
- Other name: The Railroad Museum at Ardenwood
- Status: Operational
- Owner: Society for the Preservation of Carter Railroad Resources
- Locale: Fremont, California
- Website: spcrr.org

History
- Commenced: 1981
- SPCRR established: 1978
- Horse-drawn service begins: 1985
- Track extension opened: 2022

Technical
- Line length: 1.25 mi (2.01 km)
- Track length: 1.5 mi (2.4 km)
- Track gauge: 3 ft (914 mm)

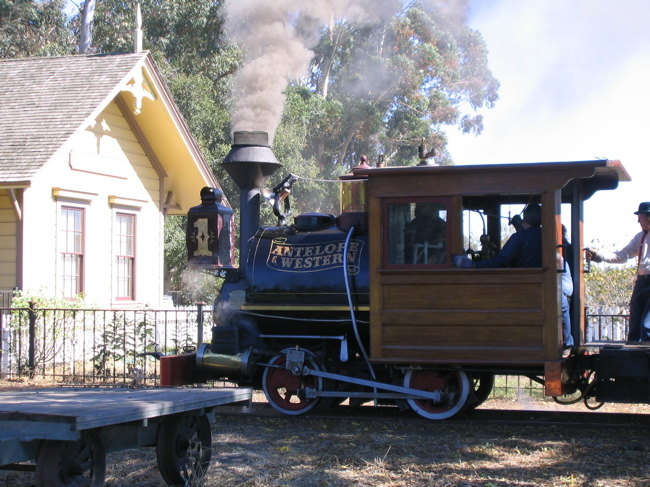
Antelope and Western Railroad Porter No. 1 at the SPCRR 2005 RailFair

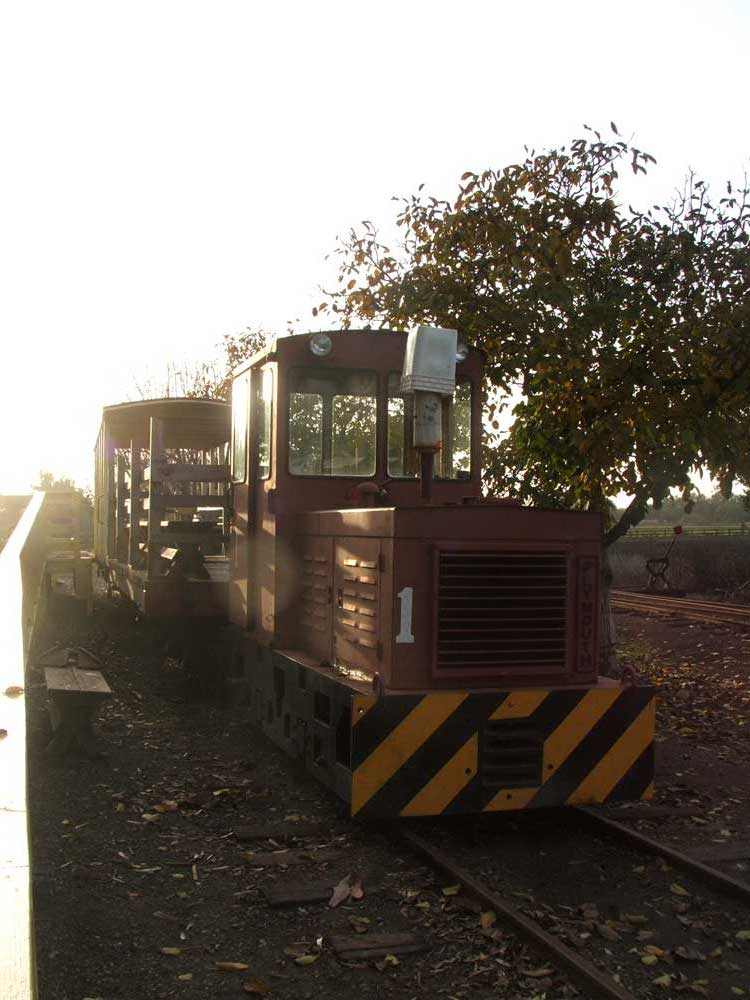
5 ton SPCRR 1 or Katie hauling cars, 1 January 2007

The Society for the Preservation of Carter Railroad Resources is a non-profit organization dedicated to the preservation of railroad artifacts created by the Carter Brothers of California. The society operates The Railroad Museum at Ardenwood, which is a heritage railroad located at Ardenwood Historic Farm Regional Park in Fremont, California.

The Society's permanent collection consists of a steam Locomotive (Kiso Forest Ry 9), 6 flatcars, 2 cabooses, 2 combination cars, 6 boxcars, a horse drawn street car, and an assortment of other small cars. In addition, the Society has a 1972 5-ton diesel Plymouth switch locomotive, a ballast car, and a tool car used for MOW and operations and leases 2 reproduction picnic cars, a steam engine (Argent 5), and an additional diesel Whitcomb locomotive for operations.

== Carter Brothers ==
Thomas and Martin Carter were Irish immigrants who began making railroad equipment in 1874, mainly building wooden cars for the South Pacific Coast Railroad (the original SPCRR). The Carter Brother's business lasted until 1902 during which time they built over 5,000 railroad cars mainly for narrow gauge lines. They also built cable cars and in later years 4 ft 8 1/2 in (1,435 mm) standard gauge equipment. Their rolling stock was used on railroads all over the western United States, Hawaii, and Latin and South America.

== The Railroad Museum at Ardenwood and Ardenwood Historic Farm Regional Park ==
The Society operates the Railroad museum at Ardenwood in Ardenwood Historic Farm Regional Park, Fremont, California. A 1.5 miles (2.4 km)-long, 3 ft (914 mm) narrow gauge track is laid along three sides of the park and the society's collection of Carter Brother's rolling stock is kept here. The collection is housed in the 3-bay Wissel Car Barn located in the Trudy Frank Railyard at the eastern end of track.

From April to November passenger trains are hauled by the Museum's switching locomotive between Ardenwood Station and Carbarn Station via Deerpark Station on three days a week and special event days.

The Society holds an annual Rail Fair each Memorial Day weekend during which visiting steam locomotives are brought in by truck.

Ardenwood Historic Farm Regional Park is 210-acre (85 ha) farm operated by the East Bay Regional Park District. The outer part of the farm is a modern organic farm and the inner historic core is operated using the farming methods of the 1880s to 1920s. In the very center of the park is the Patterson House and Gardens, a fully restored Queen Anne style House built in the 19th century by the farm's original owners, George Washington and Clara Patterson.
