= Mason Bogie locomotive =

Type of articulated steam locomotives

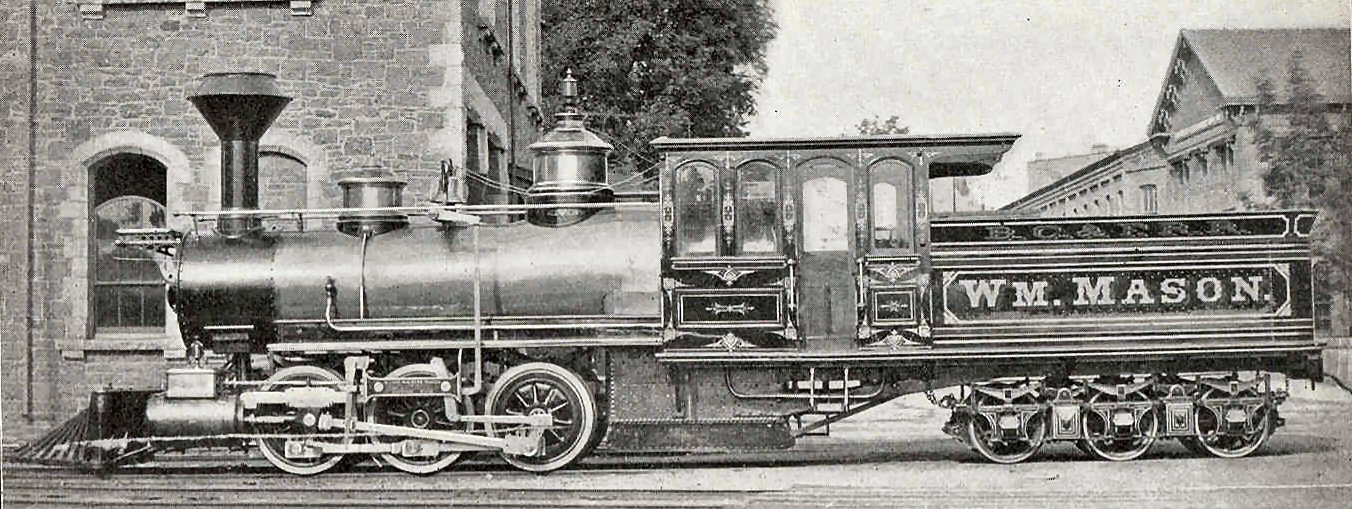
The Wm. Mason, an 1874 0-6-6RT Mason Bogie and the first locomotive with Walschaerts valve gear built in the United States. Note the intricate decorative work.

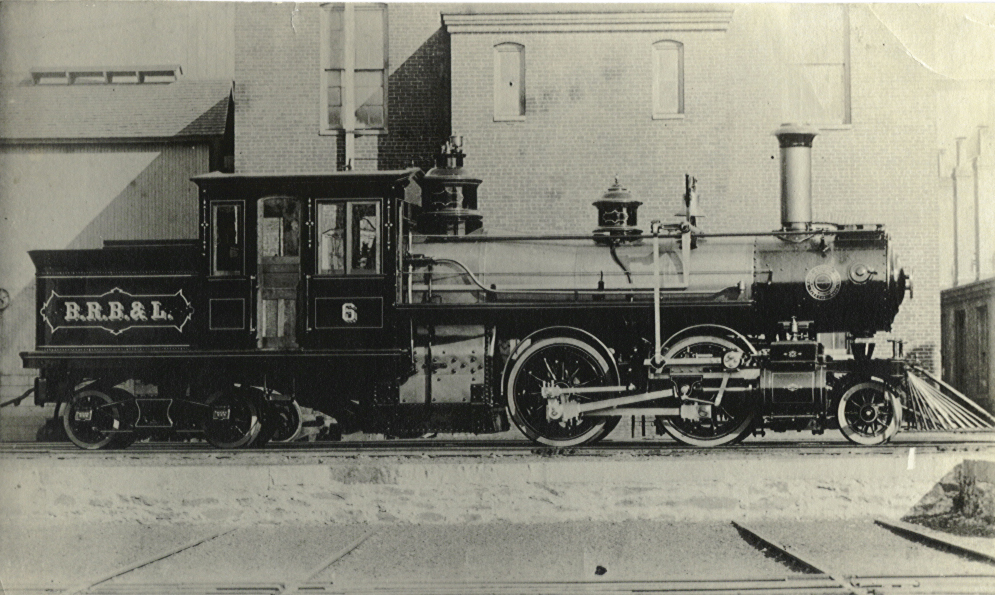
Boston, Revere Beach & Lynn #6, an 1886 product of Mason Machine Works. This is a 2-4-4RT Mason Bogie. Note the deep firebox permitted by this configuration, and the high reversing shaft (below the bell) with a long lifting link to the valve gear radius rod.

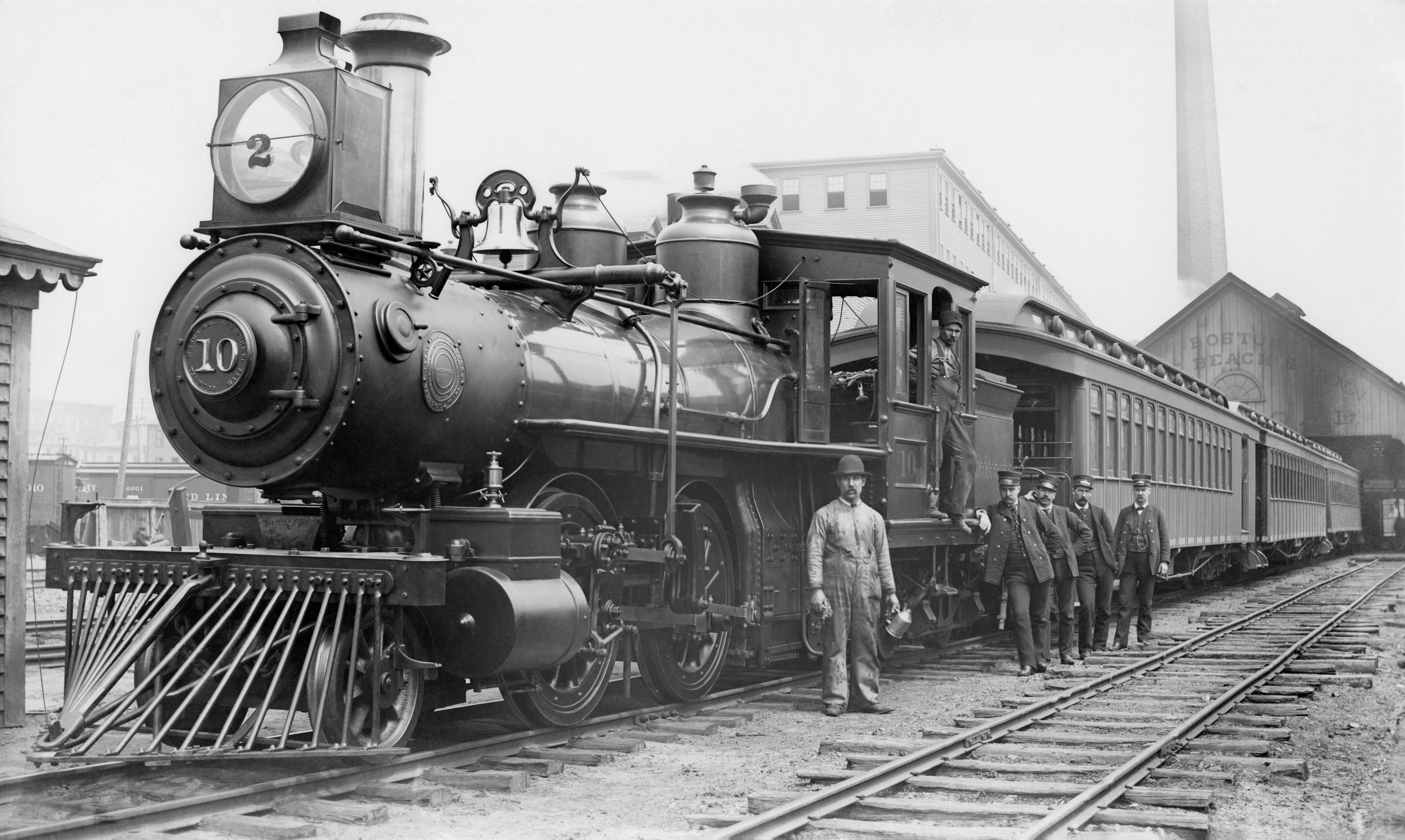
2-4-4T Mason Bogie #10. Mason Machine Works, Taunton, MA. Built 1887. Photo location: Behind the Lynn, MA Train Station of the Boston, Revere Beach and Lynn Railroad. Photo Source: Lynn Museum.

Mason Bogie locomotives (also known as Mason Fairlie locomotives) are a type of articulated tank locomotive suited for sharp curves and uneven track, once commonly used on narrow-gauge railways in the United States. The design is a development of the Single Fairlie locomotive.

== Concept and development ==
The American licensee of the Fairlie Patent steam locomotive was the firm of William Mason, located in Taunton, Massachusetts. Mason's first Fairlie locomotive was the Janus, an 0-6-6-0T Double Fairlie built in 1871.

Janus was not commercially successful and was not repeated, so Mason experimented with a different design. In 1869, a Single Fairlie locomotive 0-4-4T had been designed and constructed by Alexander McDonnell for the Great Southern and Western Railway in Ireland. This had a single boiler with one articulated, powered truck beneath it and a second, unpowered truck beneath the cab and bunker. Mason developed a set of standard plans based on this design with modified steam delivery systems. His first locomotive was the Onward, a 3 ft (914 mm) gauge 0-4-4T completed 1 July 1872. Onward would enter service on the American Fork Railroad shortly afterwards before being moved to the Eureka and Palisade Railroad in 1873.

Onward was a largely successful engine, but certain design elements proved troublesome. Bolts worked loose, center castings were too light, and the steam pipes and gaskets were insufficient. Mason redesigned the faulty castings and designed a new delivery system, in which the pivot point for the leading truck became a hollow ball joint through which the live steam for the cylinders passed. Mason also developed a sliding seal for the exhaust from the moving cylinder saddle into the smoke box. Although better, Mason's improvements took up much-needed space between the driving wheels, forcing Mason to use an outside valve gear (generally the Walschaerts valve gear). Additionally, the reversing shaft had to be mounted on top of the boiler, with a long lifting link dropping down to the radius rod, a feature unique to Mason Bogies due to the rotating truck and tight clearances.

Another problem with the early Bogies was poor tracking. Despite the drivers being articulated, excessive flange wear on the leading driver set required the use of a pilot truck. Nonetheless, these engines were in high demand, and even Onward was brought back under UP from Nevada to the Utah and Northern Railway despite the protests from Nevada Central, which owned the locomotive.

== Production and service ==
148 Bogies were produced by the Mason Machine Works between 1872 and 1890, of which 96 were narrow-gauge units, the rest being standard gauge. This was about half the firm's total output of locomotives during this period. Major buyers included the Boston, Revere Beach and Lynn Railroad, a suburban carrier which owned 32, the Denver, South Park and Pacific Railroad, a Colorado common-carrier railroad which owned 23, the New York and Manhattan Beach Railroad which owned 17, and the Wheeling and Lake Erie which was the largest standard gauge customer with 16 locomotives.

The best-known Mason Bogies were those of the Denver, South Park and Pacific, which were the largest built for narrow gauge. Most of the smaller Bogies were used on the Utah & Northern where they were found in 1884 as "large and powerful." Copies of the DSP&P's biggest engines were built for the Denver, Utah & Pacific, which sold them to the Burlington and Northwestern Railway, a CB&Q subsidiary in Iowa. The DSP&P engines were hard-used in Utah and all gone by 1894 except for one, which survived through a chain of owners until 1942.

The Boston, Revere Beach and Lynn Railroad almost exclusively used Mason Bogies and continued to order bogie types after Mason ceased locomotive production in 1890. Copies were built first by the Taunton Locomotive Manufacturing Company, then by Manchester Locomotive Works and finally by the American Locomotive Company. These were taken out of service when electrification was complete in 1928, except for two engines which were retained for snowfighting and work trains.

Snowfighting was found a considerable strength for Mason Bogies. F. G. Brownell of the Burlington & Lamoille found that their Mansfield could free itself from snowdrifts "higher than the cab" with minimal issue.

== Surviving ==
Only one Mason Bogie, Torch Lake, survives, at Greenfield Village (part of The Henry Ford) in Dearborn, Michigan, a standard gauge 0-6-4. It was built in 1873 and still hauls passengers during the summer months.

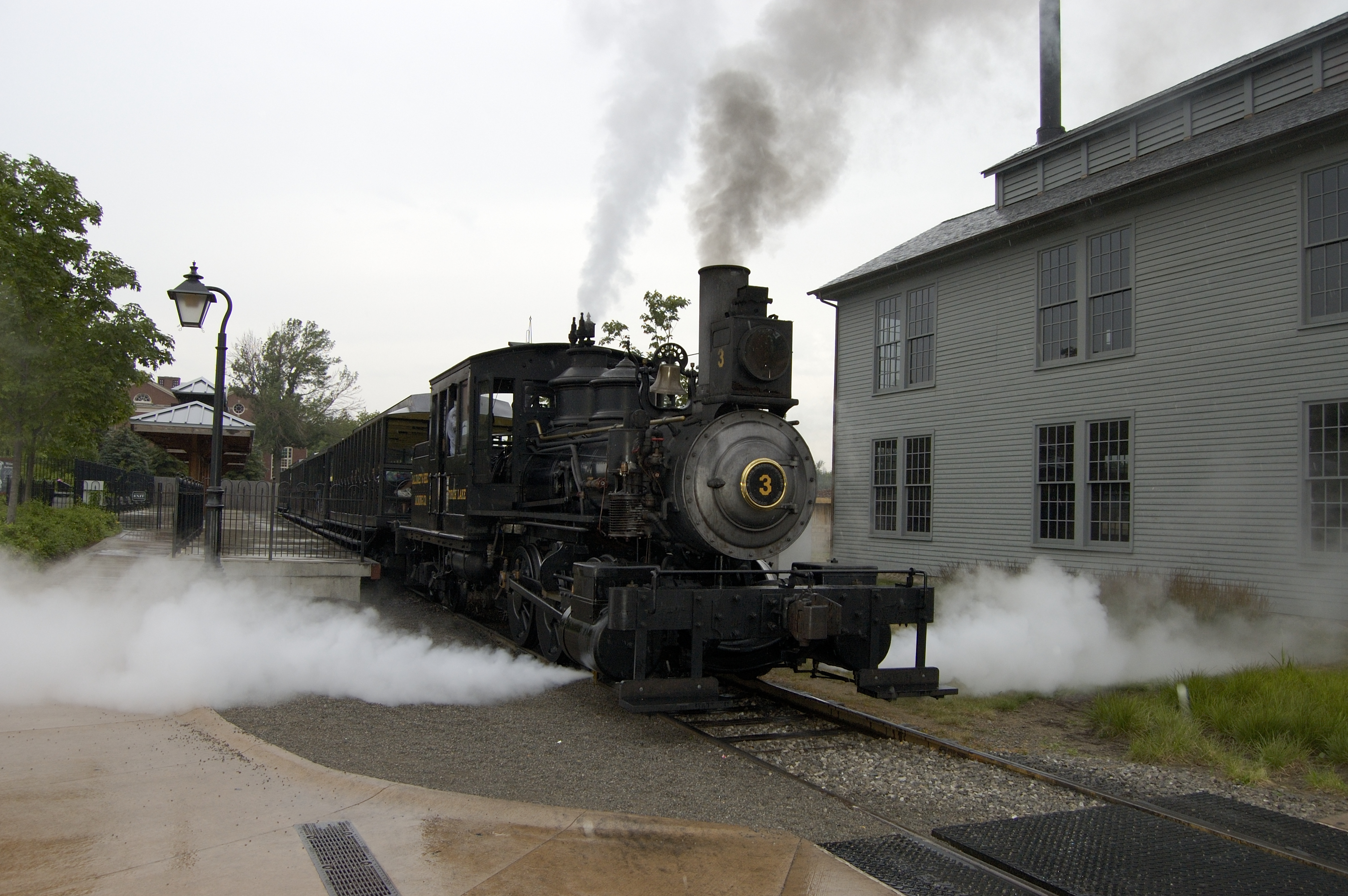
Torch Lake at Greenfield Village

== Similar designs ==
Superficially similar to the Mason Bogie is another design, the Forney locomotive. Like the Mason Bogie, the Forney has powered axles under the boiler and a trailing truck under the rear bunker and tank behind the cab. However, the Forney's driving wheels are fixed in the frame, rather than articulated. They were reasonably popular, particularly on elevated railroads.

== See also ==
- Articulated locomotive
- Bogie
- Mason Machine Works
- Narrow gauge
