= NZR B class =

NZR B class may refer to:

- NZR B class (1874)
- NZR B class (1899)
