= Port Chalmers Branch =

Rail line in Otago, New Zealand

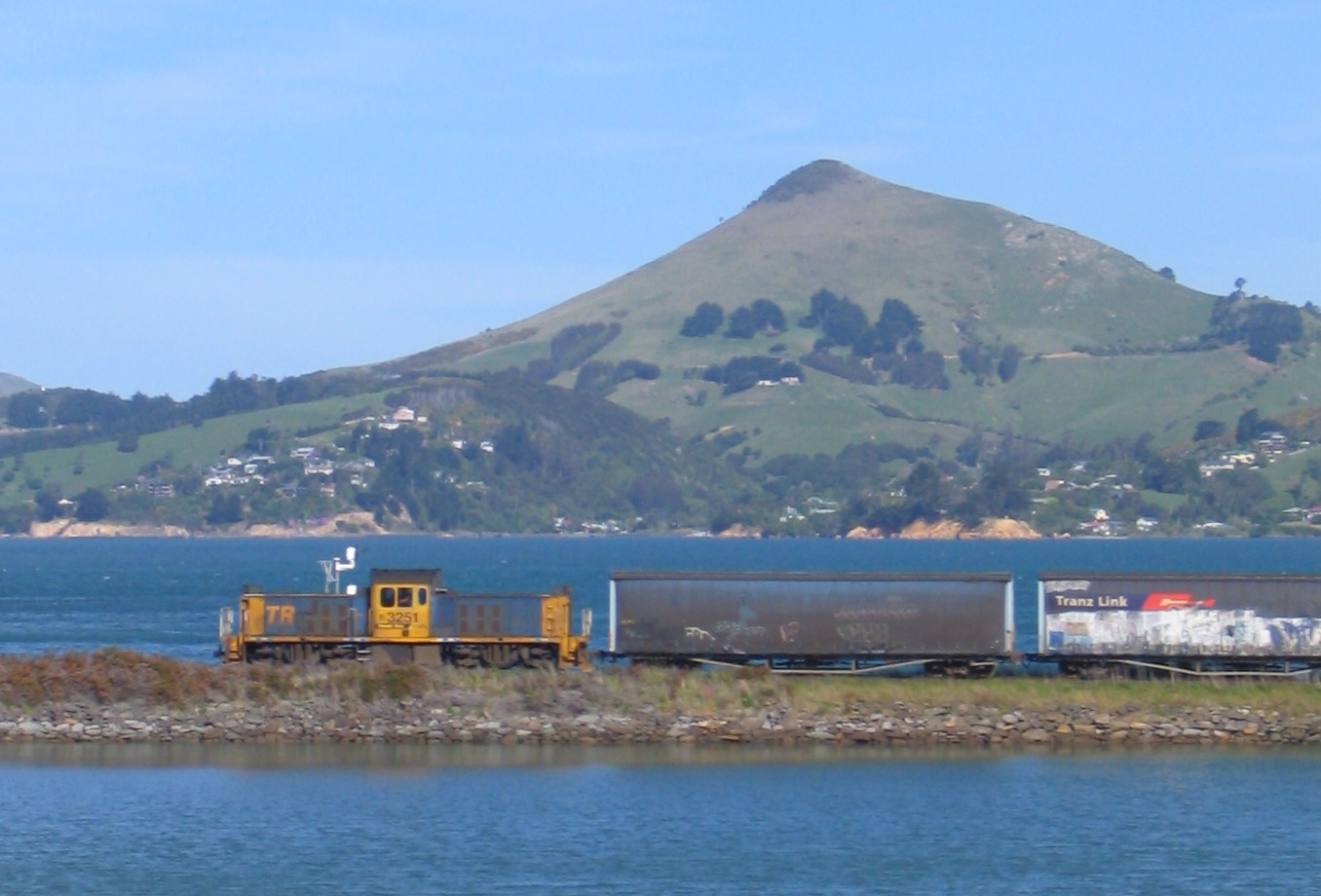
- DSG class shunting locomotive hauling freight towards Port Chalmers in 2008.

Overview
- Other names: Dunedin and Port Chalmers Railway
- Status: Open
- Owner: New Zealand Railways Corporation (land)
- Termini: Sawyers Bay; Port Chalmers

Service
- Type: Urban rail
- Operator(s): KiwiRail

History
- Opened: 31 December 1872
- Closed: 10 December 1979 (for passenger trains)

Technical
- Line length: 2.09 km (1.30 mi) (Sawyer's Bay-Port Chalmers)
- Number of tracks: Single
- Character: Urban
- Track gauge: 1,067 mm (3 ft 6 in)

The Port Chalmers Branch was the first railway line to be built in the Otago Province and connects the city of Dunedin with Port Chalmers. The line is still operational today.

== Construction and early history ==
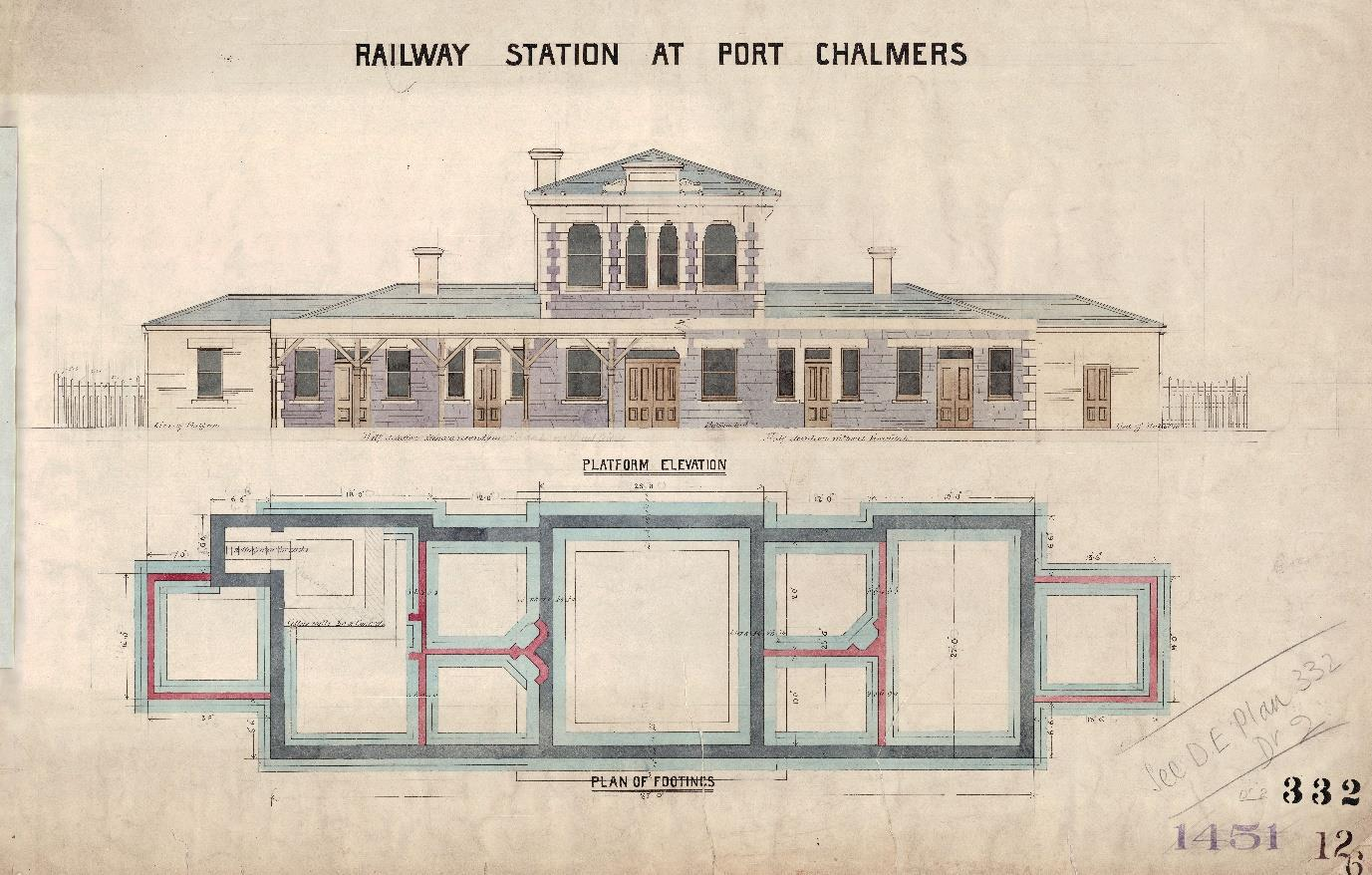
Architectural drawing of the Port Chalmers railway station

The first calls for a rail line between Dunedin and Port Chalmers date back to 1861 but plans for a railway were not drawn up until 1870. Construction started in August 1870. The rail line had reached the Roseneath Peninsula by June 1871 and work on the Grey Street tunnel began in October that year. By June 1872 the rail line was opened for trains between Port Chalmers and Dunedin. The line was approved by and constructed under the auspices of the Otago Provincial Council. It was built to the recently adopted national track gauge of 1,067 mm (3 ft 6 in), and it was the first line in the country with that gauge to open. The line was officially opened 31 December 1872 by Governor George Bowen. The New Zealand Loan and Mercantile Agency Company sold the railway to the New Zealand Government on 9 April 1873.

The first locomotive to run on the line – and the first 1,067 mm gauge locomotive to operate in New Zealand – was the E class Josephine, a double Fairlie steam locomotive. Local popularity ensured the locomotive was retained beyond its retirement from service on in 1917 and is preserved today in the Otago Settlers Museum in Dunedin. Development at Port Chalmers followed with the construction of Bowen Pier (named after George Bowen) and Export Wharf, although a railway station did not begin construction until 1879.

Much of the Port Chalmers line is now part of the Main South Line from Christchurch to Dunedin. When the first section of the mainline, from Dunedin to Waitati, opened in December 1877 a junction was established at Sawyers Bay. The section from Dunedin to Sawyers Bay became part of the Main South Line, while the remaining two kilometres to Port Chalmers became the Port Chalmers Branch. In 1880 the line was vested in the newly established New Zealand Railways Department, and the private company dissolved.

Construction of a railway station at Port Chalmers began in July 1879. It was completed by February the next year but did not open until April. The building was constructed from local bluestone and Oamaru stone. The railway station closed in 18 February 1962 and was demolished shortly after.

== Operation ==
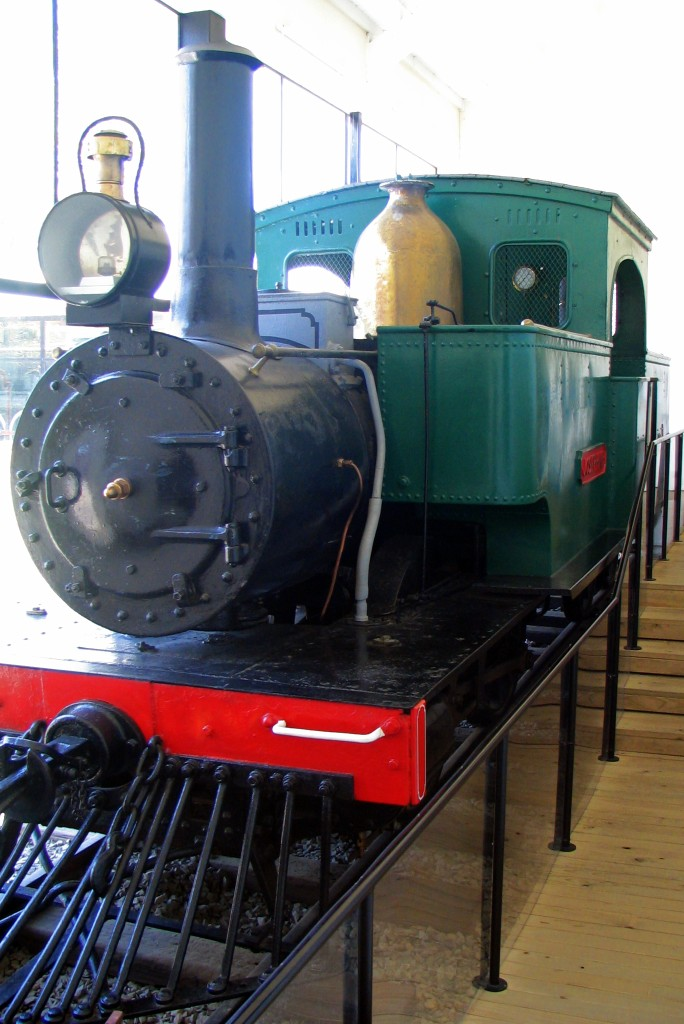
Josephine at the Otago Settlers Museum

=== Passenger services ===
Suburban passenger services were run from Dunedin on the line for over 100 years, but ceased at the end of 1979. These were usually locomotive-hauled carriage trains, but infrequently, RM class Vulcan railcars were used too. Occasional passenger services were operated by Dunedin Railways to meet cruise ships and carry tourists through the scenic Taieri Gorge on the preserved portion of the Otago Central Railway, but these services have been mothballed since mid-2020.

=== Freight services ===
The main reason for the lines existence is freight to and from the port, and as the shipping industry has changed, so has the traffic on the line. It has evolved from nineteenth century imports of supplies and exports of produce from rural Otago's farms and businesses into today's long-distance containerised freight. The line remains an important link in New Zealand's transport infrastructure and trains are operated by KiwiRail. The Taieri Gorge Railway recently sought a contract to haul logs from a location in the Taieri Gorge to Port Chalmers, but insufficient subsidies meant the venture would not have been cost efficient. In 2012 KiwiRail once again sought subsidies from the Otago Regional Council to move logs through the port, noting that there were annually 450,000 tonnes of logs in the area south of Dunedin available for processing. The volume of logs equated to 15,000 truck movements inwards. For up to $1.5 million, connecting the site to the Main South Line would reduce truck movements by 7,500 each year, KiwiRail submitted.

It estimated 400,000 tonnes of logs (about 13,000 log truck movements) were sent to Port Otago each year and better opportunities to transfer logs to and from rail could reduce truck traffic on State Highway 88 by up to 6500 movements annually. KiwiRail also noted it had increased its Otago operations, carrying 320,000 tonnes, up from 150,000 tonnes in 2010. This was mainly due to increases in freight dispatched by Fonterra from its Edendale and Mosgiel operations.

=== Motive power ===
Motive power has often been provided by shunting locomotives rather than larger mainline engines. At the start of the twentieth century, small tank locomotives such as members of the F^{A} class were used. However, in the 1960s, as diesel locomotives replaced steam locomotives on the main lines, large engines such as members of the A^{B} class operated the suburban trains to Port Chalmers.
