= NZR S class =

Class of New Zealand 0-6-4T single Fairlie locomotives

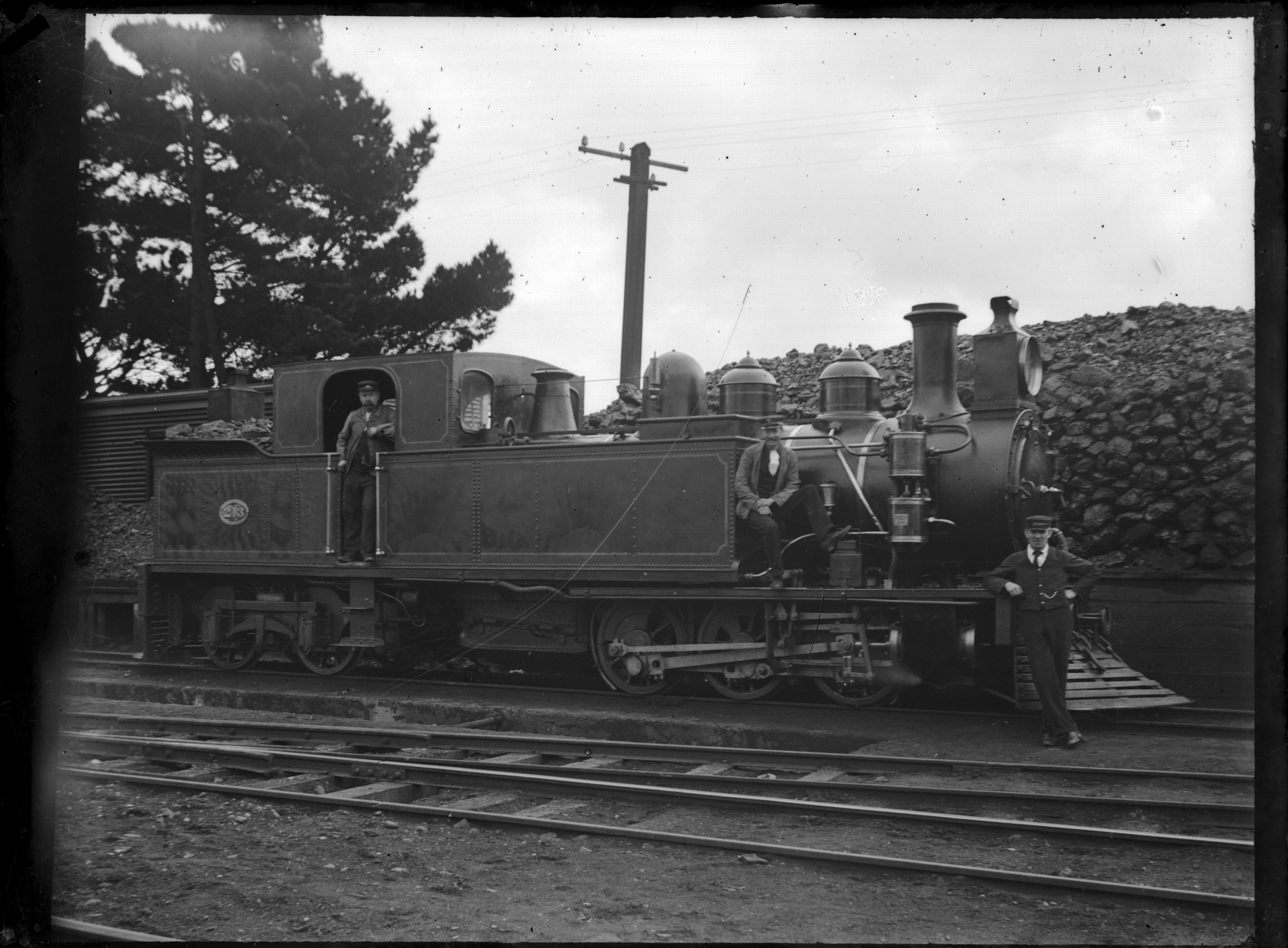
- S class 0-6-4 steam locomotive, NZR number 213. Godber Collection, Alexander Turnbull Library.
Type and origin
- Power type: Steam
- Builder: Avonside Engine Co., England
- Build date: 1880-1881
Specifications
- Configuration
  - Whyte: 0-6-4T
- Gauge: 3 ft 6 in (1,067 mm)
- Driver dia.: 36.5 in (0.927 m)
- Adhesive weight: 23 long tons (23 t; 26 short tons)
- Loco weight: 37.5 long tons (38.1 t; 42.0 short tons)
- Firebox
  - Grate area: 14 sq ft (1.3 m^{2})
- Boiler pressure: 160 psi (1,103 kPa)
- Heating surface: 664 sq ft (61.7 m^{2})
- Cylinders: Two, outside
- Cylinder size: 13 in × 16 in (330 mm × 406 mm)
Performance figures
- Tractive effort: 9,480 lbf (42.17 kN)
Career
- Operators: New Zealand Railways Department
- Number in class: 7

The NZR S class (later WAGR I class) was a class of seven 0-6-4T single Fairlie steam locomotives operated by New Zealand's Railways Department (NZR) between 1882 and 1927.

== History ==
During the 1870s, the railway network in New Zealand was a fragmented system of light railway lines built in rough country where short, steep grades and tight curves were common. The Fairlie type of steam locomotive was well-suited to working in such conditions. Earlier double-ended engines (known as Double Fairlies) suffered from frame breakages while operating in the Wanganui region, leading to the requirement for conventional engines with Fairlie's maneuverability. The Avonside Engine Company of Bristol, England was able to solve the problem by providing both the R and S classes of Single Fairlies, 18 of the former in 1878-79 and 7 of the latter in 1880-81.

The S class locomotives were manufactured with Avonside's works numbers 1279-1285. They were considerably larger than the R class, weighing six tons more and carrying two tons more water.

The locomotives were introduced into service between 1882 and 1887 and soon gained a reputation for being good steamers. Originally assigned within the Whanganui district as well as the Wellington-Summit section of the Remutaka Ranges, they were also utilized in the Taranaki and Wairarapa districts. Their smooth ride and roomy cab made them popular with engine crews over their older Double Fairlie counterparts.

=== Withdrawals ===
In 1891, despite complaints of a lack of motive power, the resident chief mechanical engineer T.F. Rotheram made arrangements to ship three locomotives (Nos. 215-217) to the Western Australian Government Railways (WAGR). These were later known as the I class Nos. I25-I27 on the WAGR roster and continued in service until 1900. Over time, the remaining four members of the class were gradually phased out from NZR service, with one being withdrawn in March 1922, and the other three in March 1927. One, No. 212 was given away at no charge to the Manawatu County Council's Sanson Tramway for use as a spare.

== See also ==
- NZR E class (1872)
- NZR B class (1874)
- NZR R class
- Locomotives of New Zealand
