= NZR R class =

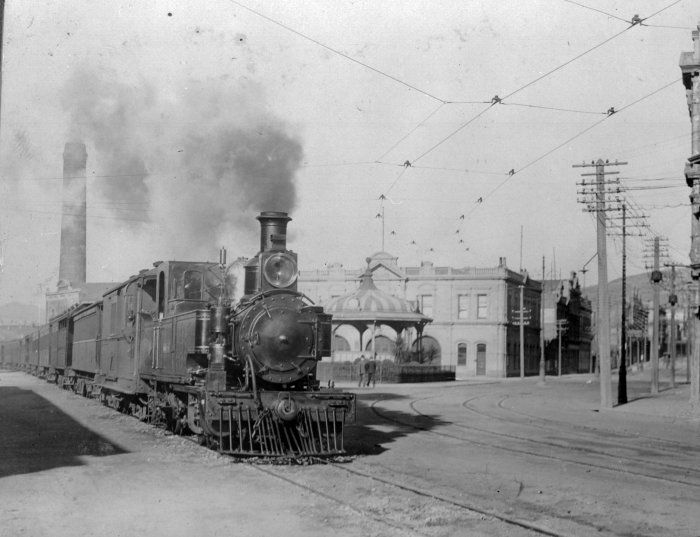
- NZR R class on Jervois Quay, Wellington, circa 1900, on the Te Aro Branch.
Type and origin
- Power type: Steam
- Builder: Avonside Engine Co., England
- Build date: 1878-79
Specifications
- Configuration
  - Whyte: 0-6-4T
- Gauge: 3 ft 6 in (1,067 mm)
- Driver dia.: 36.5 in (0.927 m)
- Wheelbase: 21 ft 10 in (6.65 m)
- Adhesive weight: 20 long tons (20.3 t; 22.4 short tons)
- Loco weight: 33 long tons (33.5 tonnes; 37.0 short tons)
- Firebox
  - Grate area: 11.8 sq ft (1.10 m^{2})
- Boiler pressure: 160 lbf/in^{2} (1,103 kPa)
- Heating surface: 556 sq ft (51.7 m^{2})
- Cylinders: Two, outside
- Cylinder size: 12.25 in × 16 in (311 mm × 406 mm)
Performance figures
- Maximum speed: 53 mph (85 km/h)
- Tractive effort: 8,420 lbf (37.45 kN)
Career
- Operators: New Zealand Railways Department
- Number in class: 18
- Disposition: 1 preserved

The NZR R class was a class of early 0-6-4T single Fairlie steam locomotives operated by New Zealand's Railways Department (NZR) between 1879 and 1936.

== Introduction ==
In the 1870s New Zealand's railway network was a small, fragmented system of light railway lines built in rough country where short, steep grades and tight curves were common. The Fairlie type of steam locomotive was well-suited to working in such conditions. In 1872, the first Fairlie locomotives arrived from England, the E class. Gradually the number of these double-ended engines (known as Double Fairlies) grew to 10, and came to include the B class of 1874. There was still a need for orthodox engines with Fairlie manoeuvrability. The Avonside Engine Company of Bristol, England solved the problem by providing both the R and S classes of Single Fairlie engines; 18 of the former in 1878-79 and 7 of the latter in 1880-81. The R class locomotives were built at Avonside's Bristol factory and then shipped to New Zealand, with all entering service by early March 1880.

The locomotives quickly earned a good reputation for speed and manoeuvrability. On a trial run, Charles Rous-Marten timed one as running from Upper Hutt to Wellington, a distance of 20 miles, in 32.5 minutes despite a number of short delays amounting to three minutes; one section of two miles was covered at a maximum speed of 53 miles per hour. They were allocated to depots across the country, and during their working life operated almost all types of services from premier passenger trains to shunting tasks. As built, they could carry 716 gallons of water, but to allow them to operate over extended distances, some were later fitted with 900 gallon side tanks. All were reboilered during their lives to raise the boiler pressure from 130 to 160 pounds per square inch.

== Accidents ==
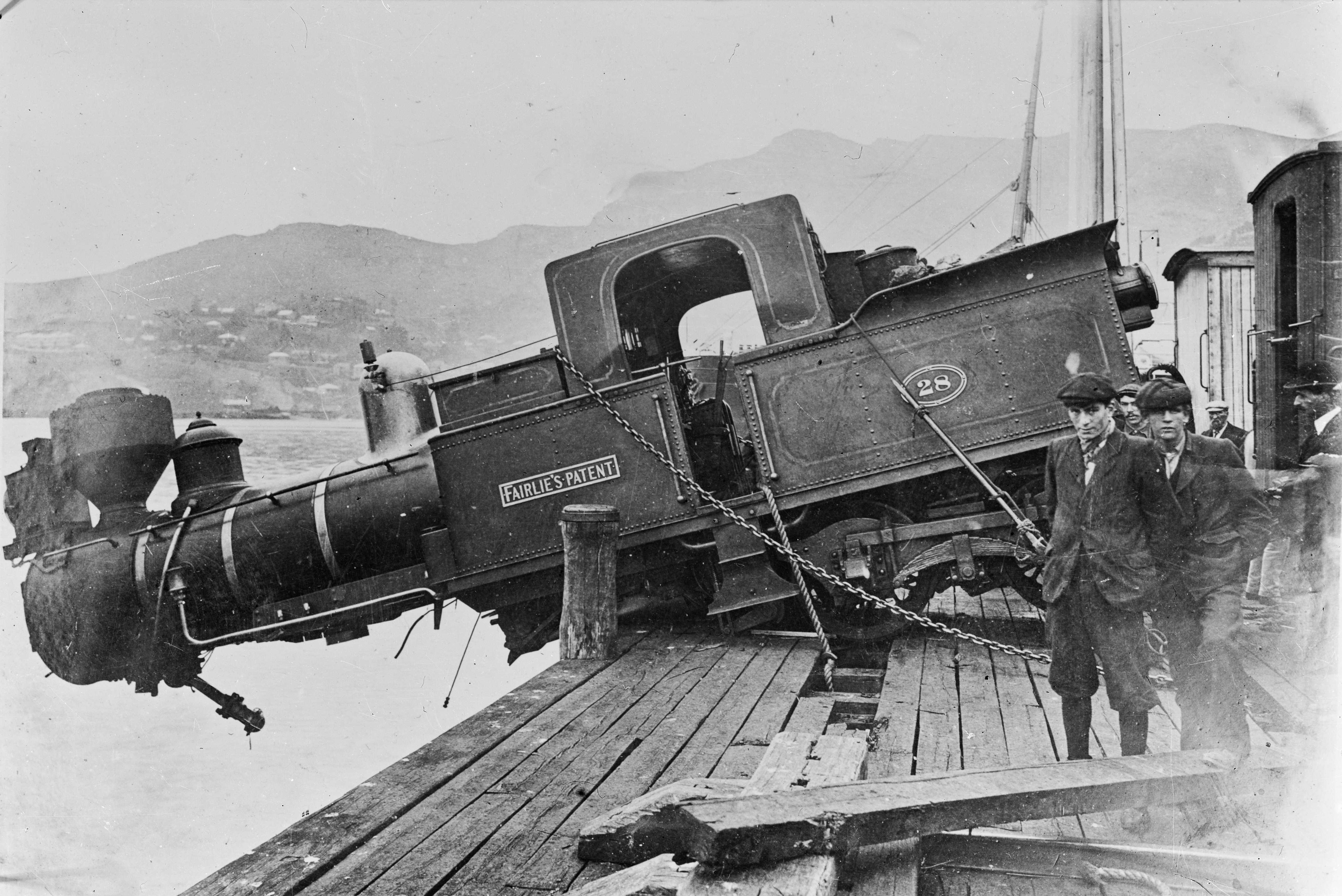
R 28 overhanging Lyttelton wharf on 23 March 1907.

The locomotives were involved in a number of accidents. On 23 March 1907, R 28 was running the Boat Train to the wharf at Lyttelton to connect with the Wellington ferry when it ran the stop-block. The driving frame, wheels and engine took a dive into Lyttelton harbour, but because of the design, the rest of the locomotive remained on the wharf.

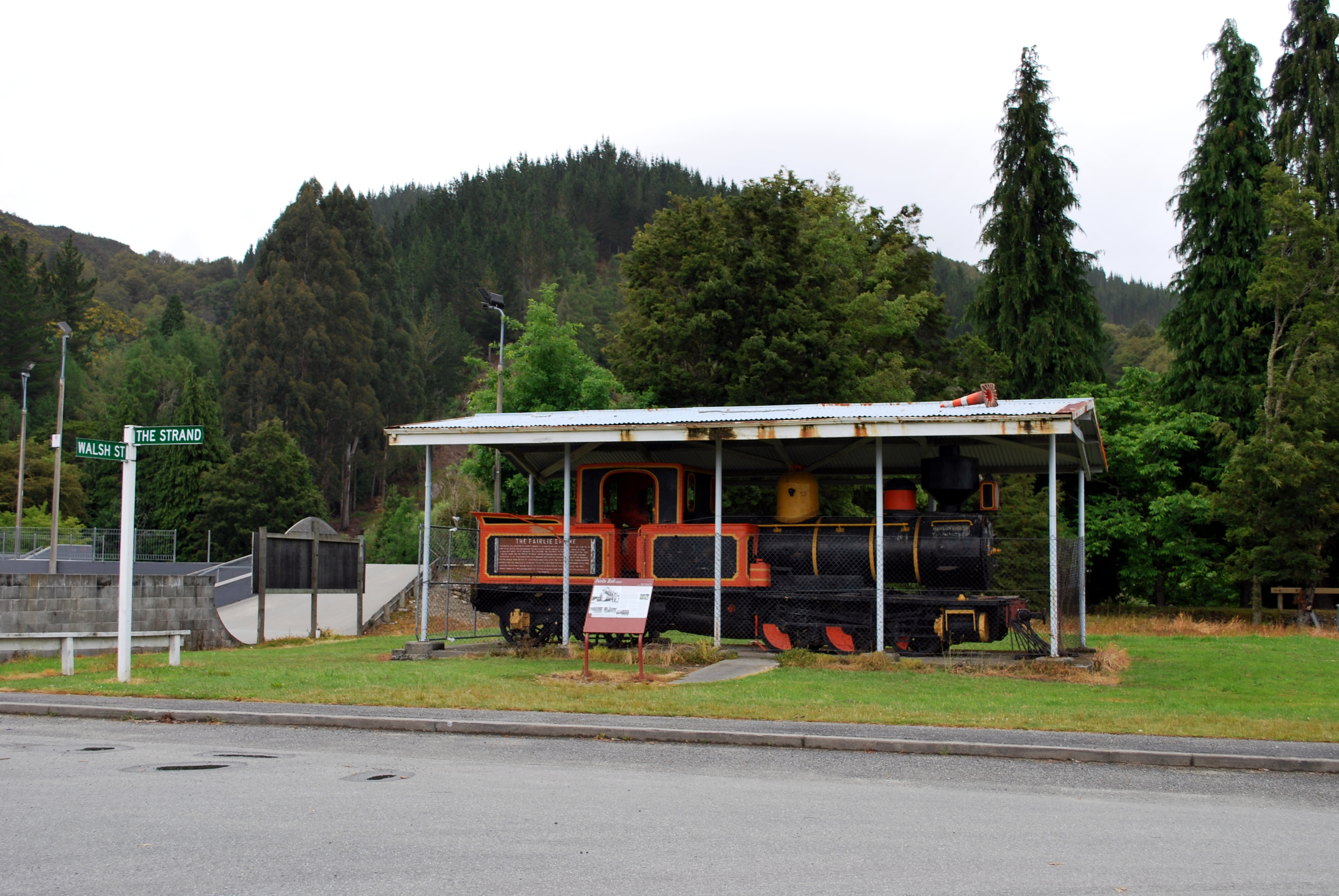
Reefton Fairlie Engine

== Retirement ==
The R class were gradually withdrawn from NZR service between 1919 and 1944, when R 29 was retired. Three R class locomotives went to the Manawatu County Council for use on the Sanson Tramway, two of which were given away free by NZR for use as spares. Another branch of government, the Public Works Department, acquired R 33 in August 1919. Five more were withdrawn in March 1922, and withdrawals continued throughout the 1920s, with only three surviving in NZR ownership into the 1930s. R 271 was retired in March 1936 and dumped at Oamaru at the foreshore. R 29 was on NZR's books until 1944, when sold to the Sanson Tramway. Her last years operating the NZR Stores Branch tram at Mamaku. R 28 was sold to the Timaru Harbour Board in 1934, an ironic new owner in light of its 1907 wharf accident at Lyttelton. Until 1940, it was for shunting the Timaru wharves. It was later sold to Burkes Creek Colliery, Reefton for use on their mining railway. Laid up in 1948, R 28 was later placed in Reefton's town park for static preservation. In 2000 a working group took over care for the locomotive, where it will be moved into the restored Reefton engine shed for ultimate restoration to working order.

== See also ==
- NZR E class (1872)
- NZR B class (1874)
- NZR S class
- Locomotives of New Zealand
- Railway preservation in New Zealand
