= NZR E class (1872) =

Class of New Zealand steam locomotives

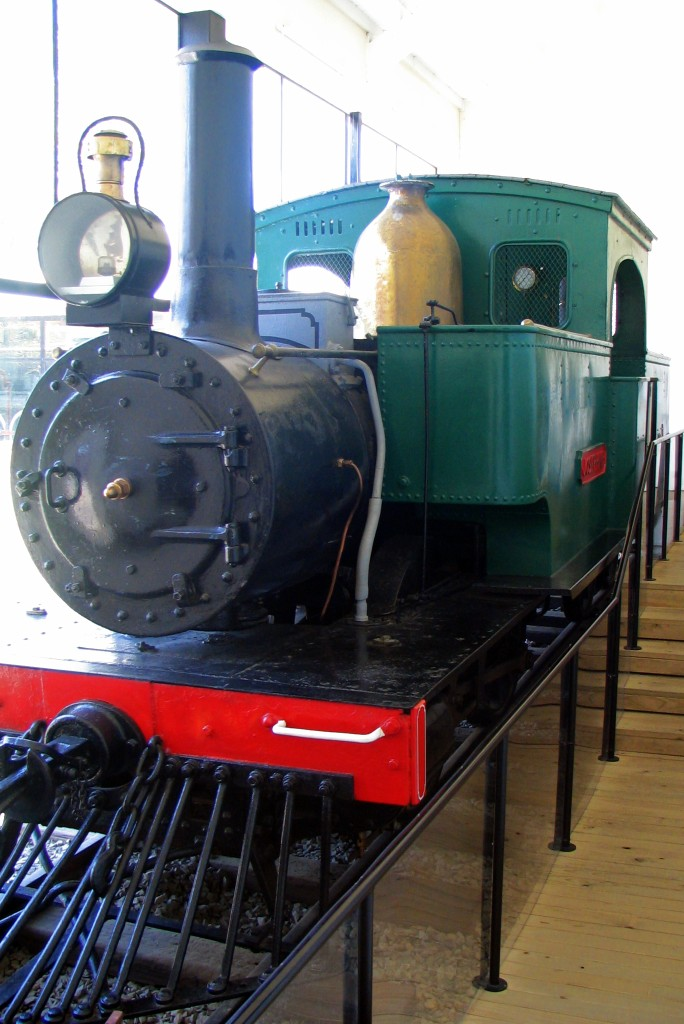
- "Josephine" at the Otago Settlers Museum.
Type and origin
- Power type: Steam
- Builder: (United Kingdom) Vulcan Foundry (2)
- Build date: 1872 (2)
- Total produced: 8
Specifications
- Configuration
  - Whyte: 0-4-4-0T
- Gauge: 3 ft 6 in (1,067 mm)
- Driver dia.: 45 in (1.143 m)
- Length: 15.7 m (51 ft 6 in)
- Loco weight: 25 short tons (22 long tons; 23 t)
- Fuel type: Coal
- Firebox
  - Grate area: 10.2 sq ft (0.95 m^{2})
- Boiler pressure: 130 lbf/in^{2} (900 kPa)
- Heating surface: 838 sq ft (77.9 m^{2})
- Cylinders: Four, outside
- Cylinder size: 10 in × 18 in (254 mm × 457 mm)
Performance figures
- Tractive effort: 8,000 lbf (35.59 kN)
Career
- Operators: Port Chalmers Railway Company, NZR
- Number in class: 8
- Nicknames: "Josephine" (175)
- First run: 11 September 1872
- Disposition: 1 preserved

NZR E Class (1875)
Type and origin
- Builder: Avonside Engine Company (6)
Specifications
- Configuration
  - Whyte: 0-4-4-0T
- Driver dia.: 39 in (0.991 m)
- Loco weight: 37 short tons (33 long tons; 34 t)
- Fuel type: Coal
- Firebox
  - Grate area: 15.8 sq ft (1.47 m^{2})
- Boiler pressure: 130 lbf/in^{2} (900 kPa)
- Heating surface: 847 sq ft (78.7 m^{2})
- Cylinders: Four, outside
- Cylinder size: 10 in × 18 in (254 mm × 457 mm)
Performance figures
- Tractive effort: 8,150 lbf (36.25 kN)

The NZR E class of Double Fairlie steam locomotives were two different types of Fairlie steam locomotives, used on New Zealand's railway network.

They were the first classes to take that designation, followed by the E class Mallet compound locomotive of 1906 and then the E class battery electric locomotive of 1922. The other Double Fairlie class was the B class, and there were also the Single Fairlie R and S classes.

== History ==
In 1872, two locomotives were ordered by the Otago provincial government to operate trains on the newly built Dunedin and Port Chalmers Railway. It was the first line to be built to the new national gauge standard of 3 ft 6 in (1,067 mm), and had Robert F. Fairlie as its consulting engineer. He persuaded the railway to order locomotives to his Double Fairlie design. Built by the Vulcan Foundry in England, the locomotives were shipped to New Zealand in kit set form. Arriving at Port Chalmers in August, they were unloaded onto the wharf where they were assembled. The railway's No.2 Josephine was assembled first as it had been unloaded closer to the end of the wharf. After two weeks, she first raised steam on 11 September 1872. After a short test run, "Josephine" was used to help finish the construction of the line while No. 1 Rose was completed.

In 1875, needing additional motive power for the lightly-laid lines of the period, the national Government placed an order with Avonside for six Double Fairlie locomotives that became the E class. Larger and more powerful than the Vulcan locomotives, the Avonsides proved to be the most successful Double Fairlies in NZ. An initial feature of the class was the positioning of the sandboxes on top of the smokebox and around the base of the funnel, later changed. The class also continued the use of Walschaerts valve gear that was introduced on the B class Double Fairlies.

== In service ==
At the official opening of the Dunedin and Port Chalmers Railway, "Rose" hauled the first official train. Both locomotives continued in service until the railway was amalgamated into the Government system, becoming class "E" and gaining Otago section numbers. In 1879, "Josephine" was used as a banking locomotive south of Oamaru on the first train on the newly completed Main South Line between Dunedin and Christchurch, hauled by K 88 "Washington". There was much discussion over whether "Josephine" or the new American locomotive should lead – K 88 kept its position as lead loco. "Josephine" had to be removed from the train at Palmerston, as the driver had forced her to take too much of the load and as a consequence she developed mechanical problems.

Upon the general re-numbering of 1888-90 "Josephine" was numbered E 175, and lasted in NZR service until 1900. She was sold to the Public Works Department, re-numbered PWD 504 and used in the construction of railway lines before they were handed over to the Railways Department. She was transferred to the North Island and utilised in the construction of the North Island Main Trunk Railway before she returned to her former home for the construction of the Otago Central Railway, before her retirement in 1917. Both locomotives had a reputation of being rather unspectacular performers.

The class was assigned to the North Island, based in Wanganui and New Plymouth, where they saw out their entire careers. Three received names under the aborted naming scheme of the time – "Albatross", "Pelican" and "Penguin". They gave good reliable service, but the complexity resulting from the fact that they had double the moving parts of a normal locomotive led to maintenance difficulties.

== Withdrawal and disposal ==
"Rose" suffered an accident in 1878, and was withdrawn from service, never to be repaired. It is presumed she was scrapped or disposed of in the manner of the day. "Josephine", once withdrawn from Public Works Department service in 1917, was sold for scrap to the Otago Iron Rolling Mills.

All had been officially withdrawn by 1906, but they continued to be maintained and used for many years after. In 1920 the Railways Department discovered their continued use, much to its annoyance, and they were removed from service and scrapped.

== Preservation ==
Only "Josephine", one of the Vulcan locomotives, has survived. After being sold for scrap to the Otago Iron Rolling Mills in 1917, she languished at the company's Green Island premises. She was still there in 1926 when the company had her cosmetically restored (including the fitting of balloon funnels, which she never had in service) and she was placed on display at the New Zealand South Seas Exhibition of 1926 next to A^{B} class 608 "Passchendaele". At this time she was placed in the ownership of the Otago Settlers Museum. This is believed to be the first example of railway preservation in New Zealand.

"Josephine" was subsequently displayed in the park area next to the museum, where she deteriorated in the elements. In the 1960s she was cosmetically restored again, this time with correct-style funnels, and placed inside a protective glass room adjoining the museum. She is one of the oldest preserved locomotives in New Zealand, giving way to the older A67, built in 1873, at Dunedin's, Ocean Beach Railway, and the only surviving provincial Government locomotive. There are no current plans to restore her to operational condition.

Although none of the other locomotives survived, one of the powered bogies from an Avonside E Class exists cylinder-less at Ferrymead Heritage Park, Christchurch.

== Classification ==
The E classification was used a number of times for locomotives, in the case of Double Fairlies for two different types of locomotives, built by Vulcan in 1872 and Avonside in 1875. The Avonside locomotives were the first Double Fairlies to be classed E, with the Vulcan locomotives gaining the E classification upon being incorporated into the Government system not long after. As at the time separate classification systems existed for the different sections, the Vulcan pair assumed the E classification independently of the Avonside locomotives. Upon the general renumbering of 1888-90 only "Josephine" of the Vulcan pair was still in service and retained the E classification, but load schedules would have differentiated between the South Island Vulcan Fairlie and the North Island Avonside Fairlies. As "Josephine" never ventured to the North Island in NZR service, the E classification would not have been an issue despite there being two distinct types of locomotive.

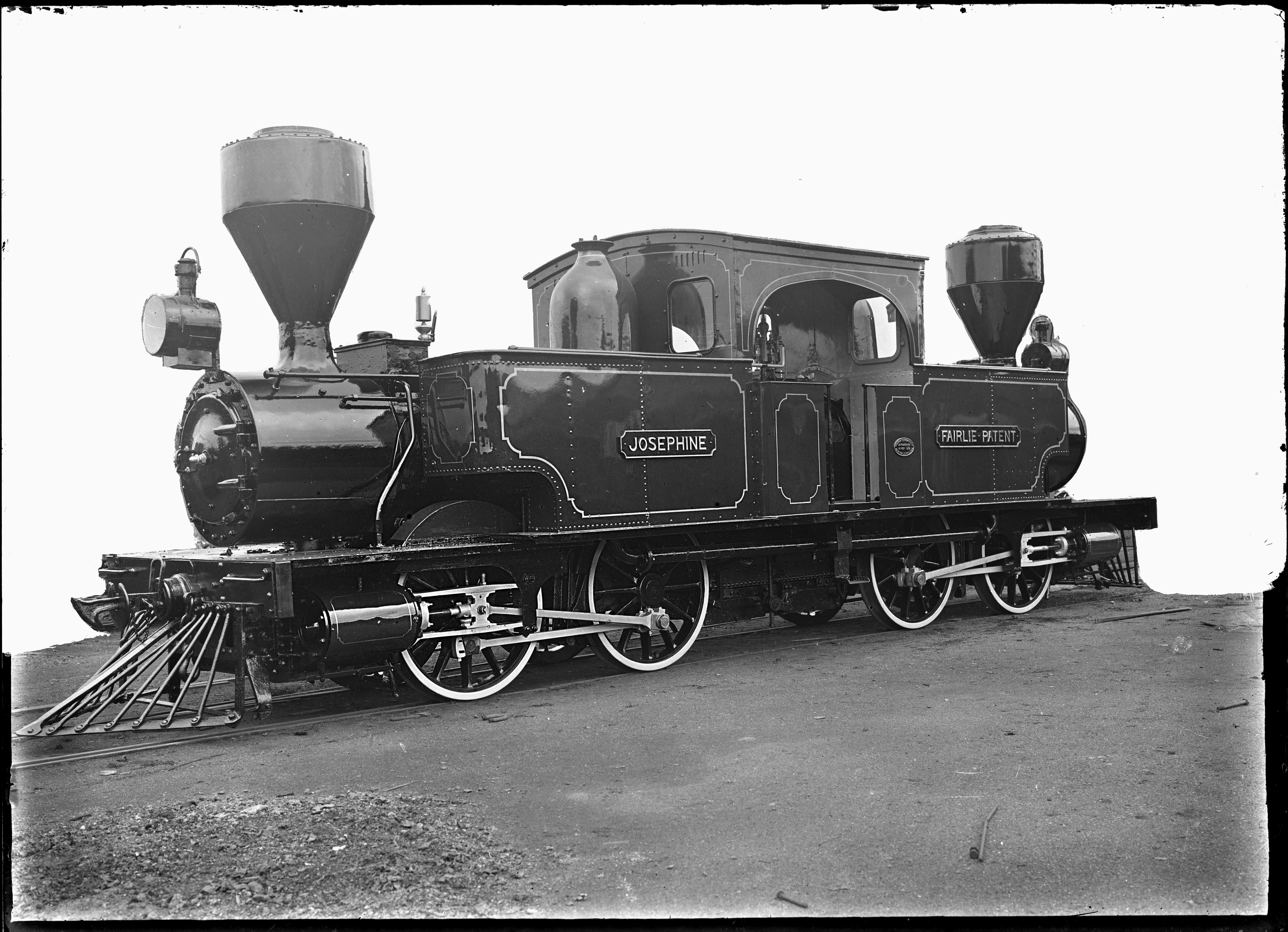
Vulcan-built Josephine

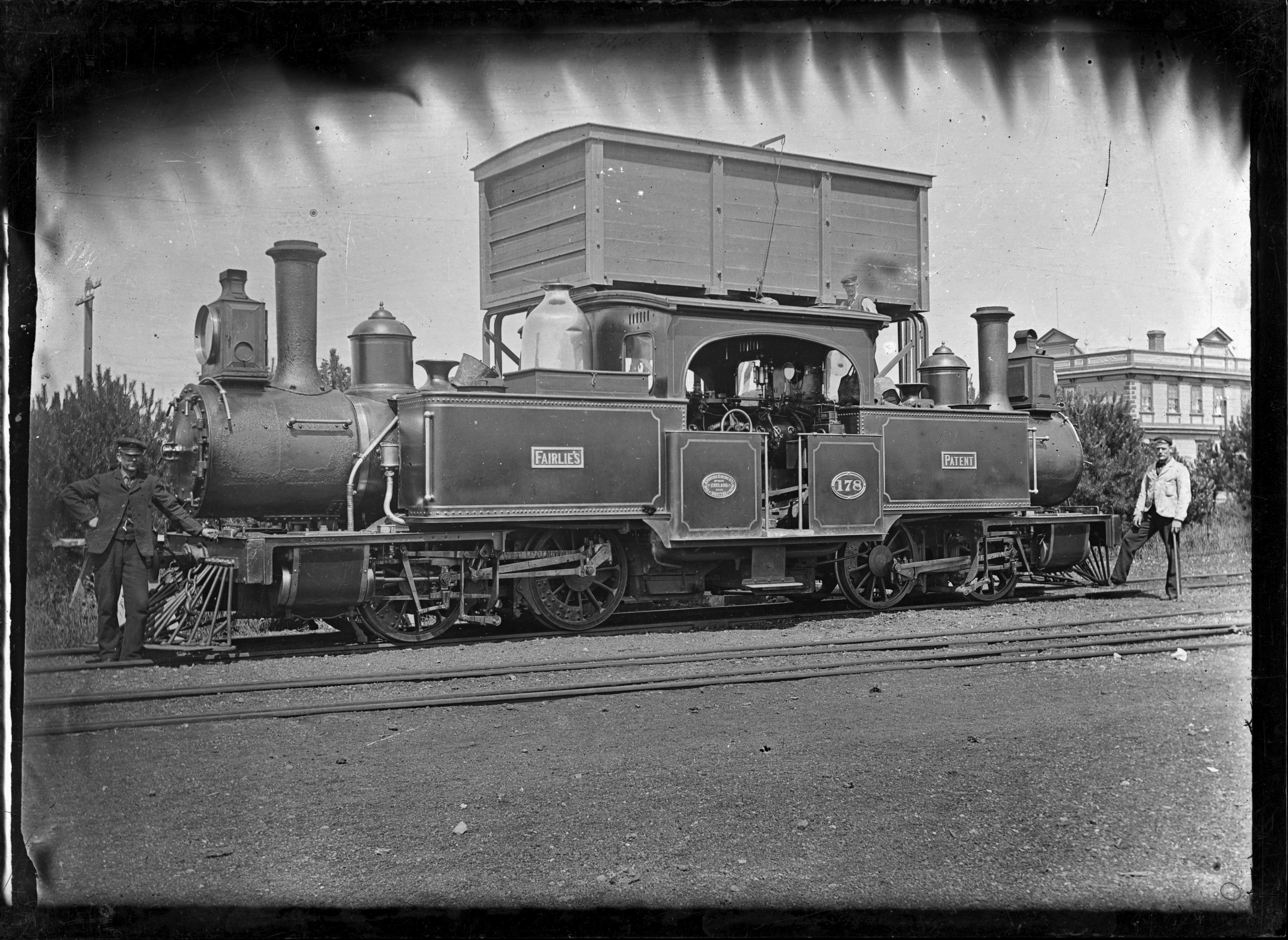
Avonside-built E class, No 178

== See also ==
- NZR B class (1874)
- NZR R class
- NZR S class
- Locomotives of New Zealand
- Railway preservation in New Zealand
