= Fairlie locomotive =

Type of articulated locomotive

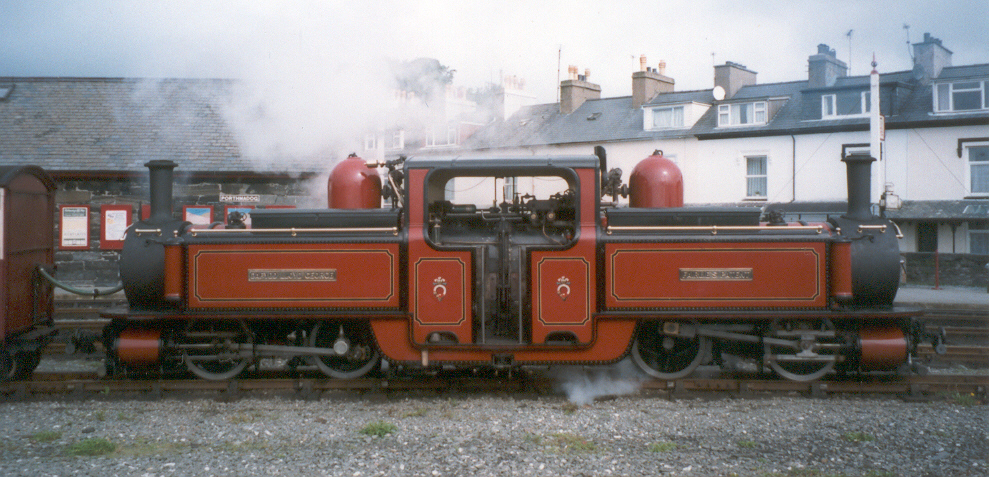
David Lloyd George of the Ffestiniog Railway. Built in 1992.

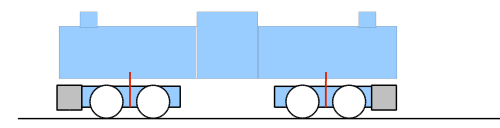
Diagram of a Fairlie locomotive

A Fairlie locomotive is a type of articulated steam locomotive that has the driving wheels on bogies. It was invented by Robert Francis Fairlie. The locomotive may be double-ended (a double Fairlie) or single ended (a single Fairlie). Most double-ended Fairlies had wheel arrangements of 0-4-4-0T or 0-6-6-0T. All were tank locomotives.

While Fairlie locomotives are now used only on heritage railways, the majority of diesel and electric locomotives in the world follow the basic form of the Fairlie — two power trucks with all axles driven. Many also follow the Fairlie's double-ended concept, capable of being driven equally well in both directions.

== Development of the design ==
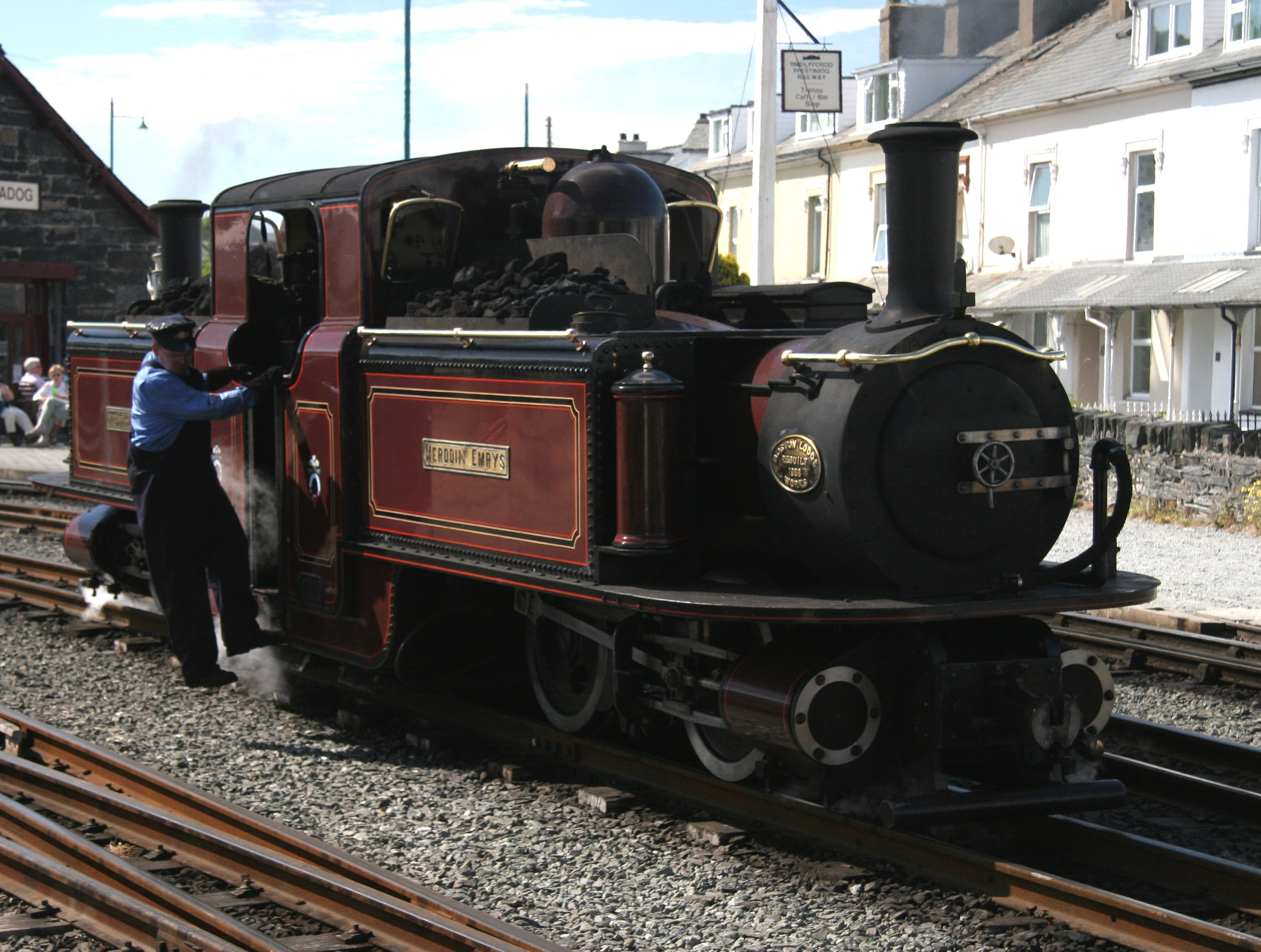
Double Fairlie Merddyn Emrys at Porthmadog

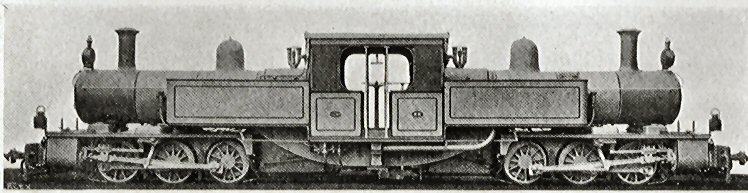
Fairlie locomotive with two separate boilers built for Burma Railways by the Vulcan Foundry

In 1864, the Scottish engineer Robert Francis Fairlie published a pamphlet detailing his plans for a new type of articulated locomotive. He had become convinced that the conventional pattern of locomotive could be improved on, and that his proposed design would have higher tractive effort as all the locomotive's weight was on the driving wheels, was able to traverse sharper curves than a non-articulated locomotive of the same length, would be better at producing steam from its double boilers and would not need turntables because it could be driven in either direction. He received a patent for this design in May 1864.

Fairlie's design was a double-ended steam locomotive that carried all its fuel and water on the locomotive and had every axle driven. It had a double-ended boiler, with one firebox in the centre and a smokebox at each end.

=== Predecessors ===
Fairlie was not the first engineer to design and build a double-engine. In 1850, the Belgian company John Cockerill & Co built a double-boiler locomotive called Seraing which featured two independently articulated driving bogies. It had several differences from Fairlie's design, notably the buffers were fixed to the carrying frame, not the bogies, and the bogies were attached to the frame using four carrying pins, which restricted the degree of articulation. Seraing was a failure and Robert Fairlie was likely unaware of it when he produced his design in the 1860s. In the early 1860s, Archibald Sturrock, the locomotive superintendent of the Great Northern Railway, experimented with powered bogies under the tenders of GNR steam locomotives. While these were not ultimately successful, Fairlie was influenced by Sturrock's work, and by the use of back-to-back locomotives on the Bhor Ghat incline on the Great Indian Peninsula Railway starting in 1856.

=== Firebox ===
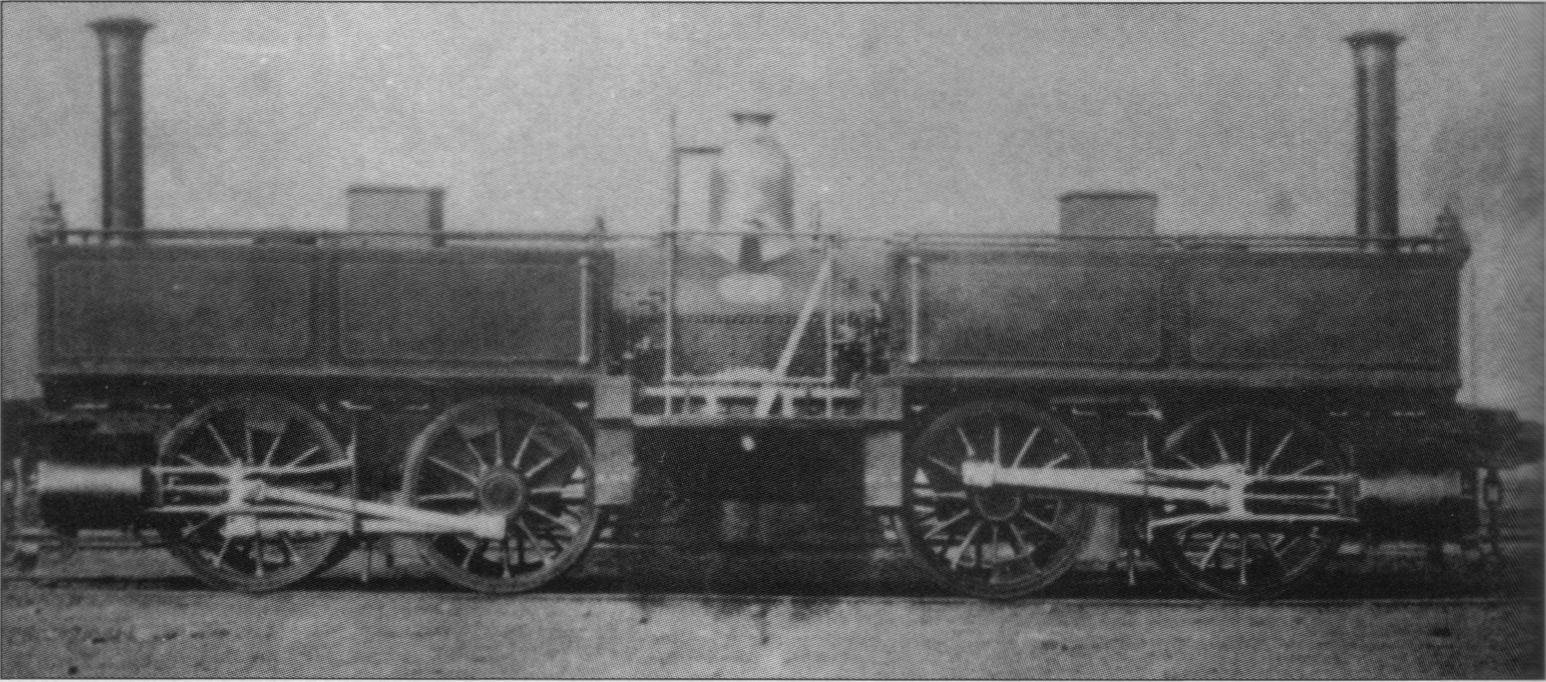
Mountaineer built in 1866 by James Cross and Company for the Neath and Brecon Railway

The first locomotive was The Progress, built in 1865 by James Cross and Company for the Neath and Brecon Railway. However, having the draught from both halves of the boiler through one firebox was unsuccessful. There was a tendency for most of the hot gases from the fire to go through one half of the boiler, so the other half made little contribution to steam-raising and was inefficient. The first, Festiniog Railway Little Wonder, had separate fireboxes with a water jacket between them and proved far more successful.

=== Controls ===
The locomotive driver (US: engineer) worked on one side of the locomotive, and the fireman on the other; the fireboxes separated them. The regulators for both power bogies were located above the centre of the fireboxes, with the steam brake valve at one end.

=== Power bogies ===
Underneath, the locomotive was supported on two swivelling powered bogies (US: trucks), with all wheels driven; smaller locomotives had four-wheel bogies, while larger had six-wheel. The cylinders on each power bogie pointed outward, towards the locomotive ends. Couplers and buffers (where fitted) were mounted on the bogies, not on the locomotive frame, so that they swivelled with the curvature of the track.

=== Steam supply ===
Steam was delivered to the cylinders via flexible tubing. Initially, this was a coiled copper tube but this would fracture after a period of use. Later locomotives had rigid connecting tubes with the necessary flexibility provided by metal ball-and-socket joints similar to those used in laboratory glassware.

=== Fuel and water ===
Fuel and water were carried on the locomotive, in side tanks beside each boiler for the water, and bunkers for the fuel above them.

== Examples in use ==
Armed with the success of Little Wonder on the Ffestiniog, Fairlie staged a series of very successful demonstrations on the Ffestiniog line in February 1870 to high-powered delegations from the many parts of the world. This sold his invention (and the concept of the narrow-gauge railway on which it was based) around the world.

Locomotives were built for many British colonies, for the Russian Empire, and even one example for the United States.

In 1879, the first government railway line in Western Australia from Geraldton to Northampton utilised two double Fairlies as its third and fourth items of motive power, respectively, but without much success. The only really successful uses of the Fairlie locomotive, other than on the Ffestiniog Railway, were in Mexico, New Zealand, and Russia (on the Transcaucasian Railway).

=== Wales ===
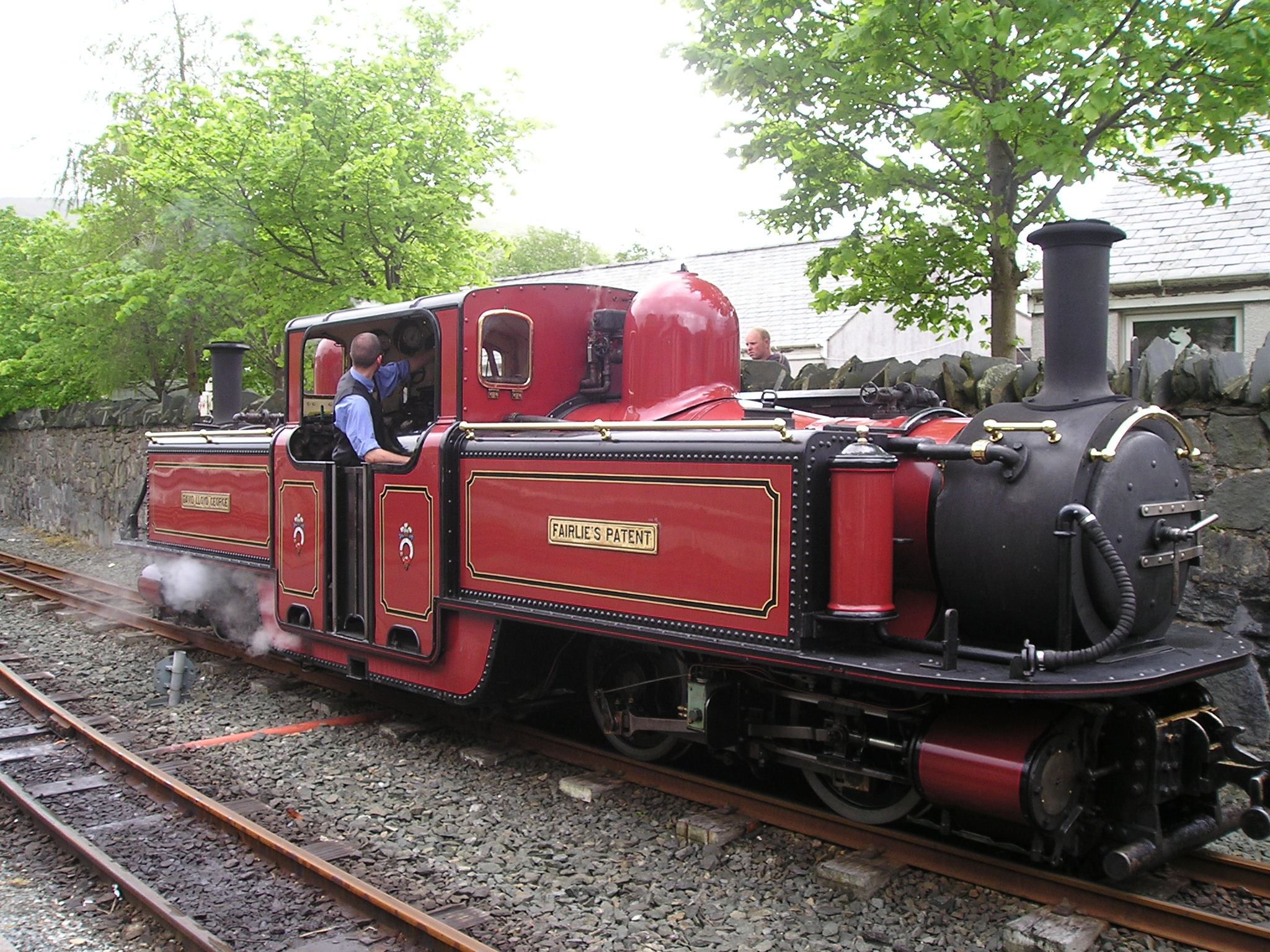
David Lloyd George built in 1992 for the Ffestiniog Railway.

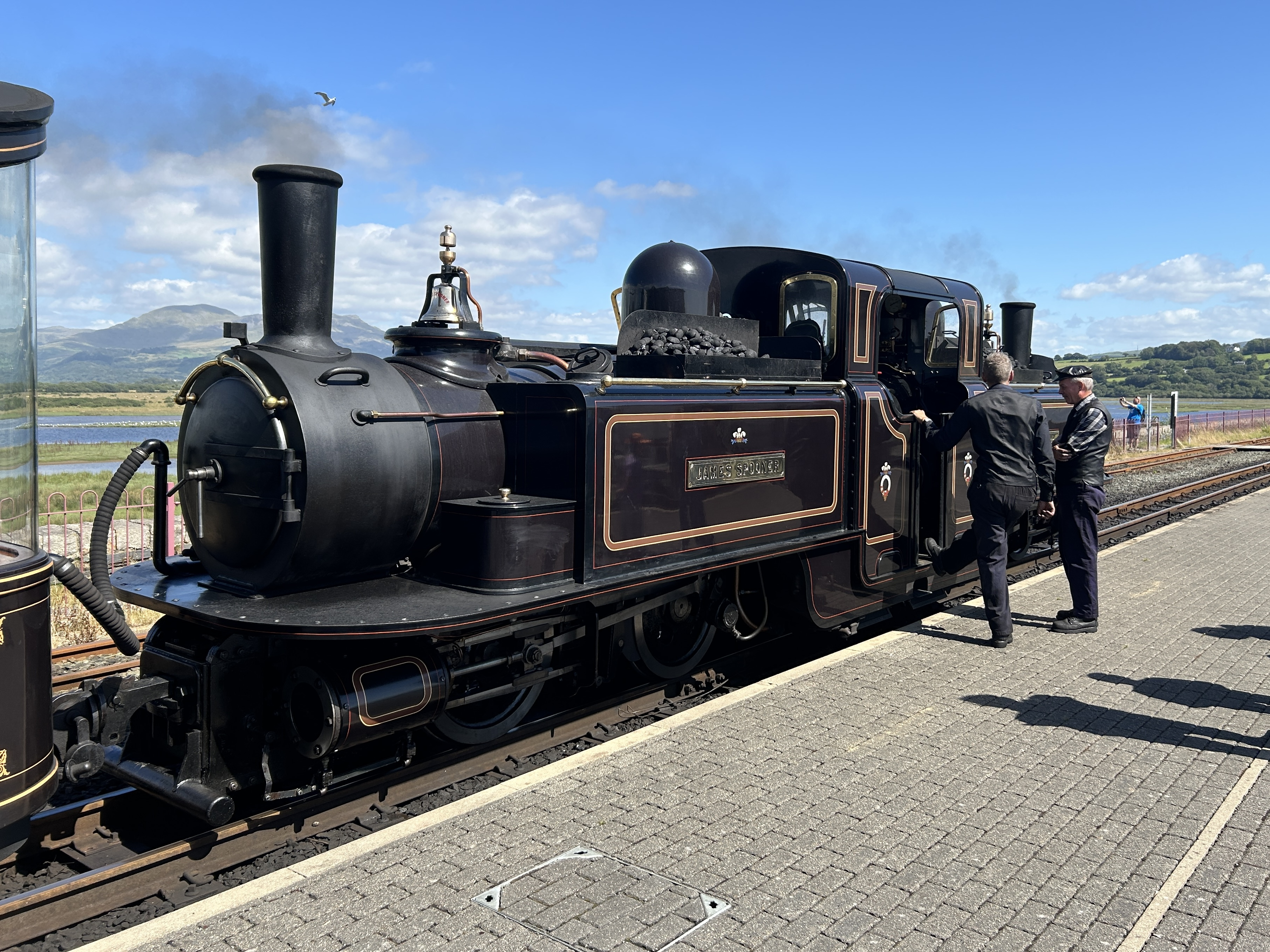
The new James Spooner is the seventh locomotive to be built by the FR Co. in its workshops, and the seventh FR Double Fairlie.

In 1869, Robert Fairlie's company built a locomotive named Little Wonder for the Ffestiniog Railway, a narrow-gauge slate railway in North Wales. The Ffestiniog was the first 1 ft 11 1/2 in (597 mm) gauge railway to use locomotives. The Fairlie design meant that the fireboxes and ashpans were not restricted by frame or track width, but only by the overall loading gauge. Little Wonder was such a success that Fairlie gave the Festiniog Railway Company a perpetual licence to use his locomotive patent without restriction, in return for using the line and the success of its Fairlie locomotives in his publicity. During its original operation, the Ffestiniog owned a total of five Fairlie locomotives (four Double and one Single), one of which is on display in the UK National Collection. Since the reopening of the railway in preservation, their Boston Lodge workshops have built three new Double Fairlies, the most recent being James Spooner, which entered service in 2023 to replace Earl of Merioneth.

=== United States ===
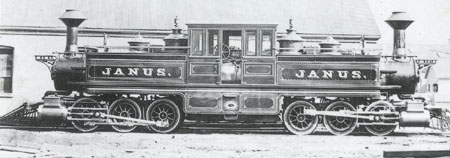
Mason Janus built in 1877

The locomotive sold in the US was ordered for the newly built Denver and Rio Grande Railroad in 1872, and was named "Mountaineer". It was the only Double Fairlie to operate on an American narrow-gauge railway. This was a smaller locomotive with four-wheel bogies, giving it a 0-4-4-0T configuration. The railroad's experience with the locomotive was typical, and an indication of the fact that, though Fairlie had eliminated several problems of the conventional locomotive, he had introduced new ones of his own. At least one double Fairlie 0-6-6-0T No. 164 Janus (pictured) was built by the Mason Machine Works in Taunton, Massachusetts and worked on the Lehigh Valley Railroad.

=== Canada ===
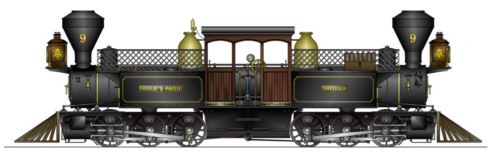
Toronto and Nipissing Fairlie 0-6-6-0 No. 9 Shedden built by the Avonside Engine Company in 1871

Five narrow-gauge Fairlie Patent locomotives were built by the Avonside Engine Company, Bristol in the early 1870s for use by Canadian railways.

The Toronto and Nipissing Railway used a single 3 ft 6 in (1,067 mm) gauge Fairlie from 1871 until the line was converted to 4 ft 8 1/2 in (1,435 mm) standard gauge in 1883.

The Toronto, Grey and Bruce Railway of Ontario also used one 3 ft 6 in (1,067 mm) gauge Fairlie locomotive, delivered in 1872.

In Cape Breton Island, three 3 ft (914 mm) gauge Fairlie Patent locomotives built by Bristol's Avonside Company were used to haul coal between Sydney and Reserve Mines from 1872 until 1902. Herb MacDonald's book "Cape Breton Railways: An Illustrated History" (Cape Breton University Press, 2012) states that "a railway industry journal published early in 1903 stated that 'the old double-end locomotives... have recently been taken apart at the Reserve, and will be disposed of as old junk. The machinists who took them apart say it was the hardest job they ever tackled, as the engines were very strongly built and the parts mostly forge-made'."

=== Mexico ===
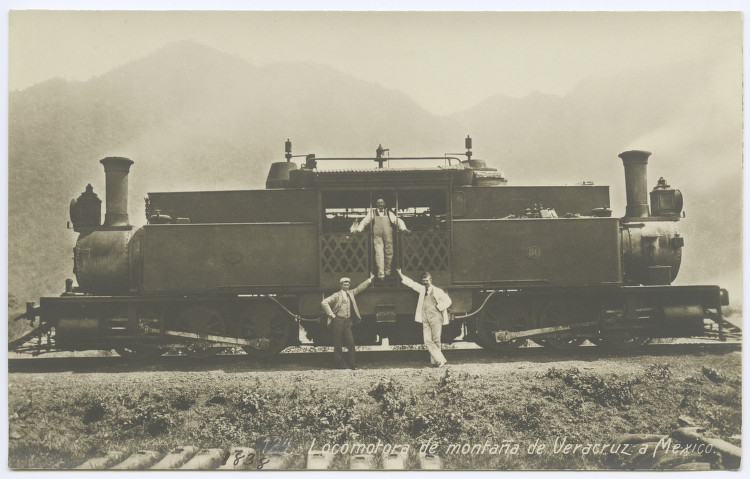
Locomotora de Montaña Fairlie, Veracruz, circa 1903.

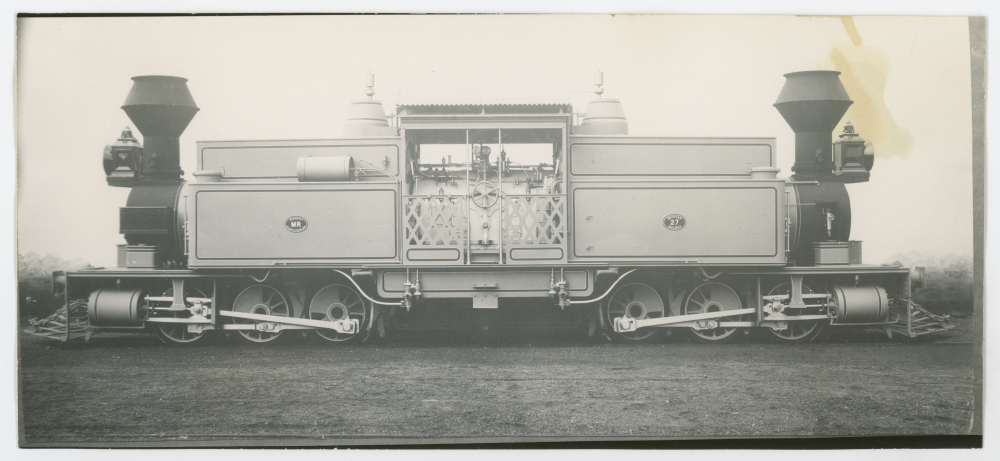
Double-Ended Ferrocarril Mexicano Locomotive No. 27

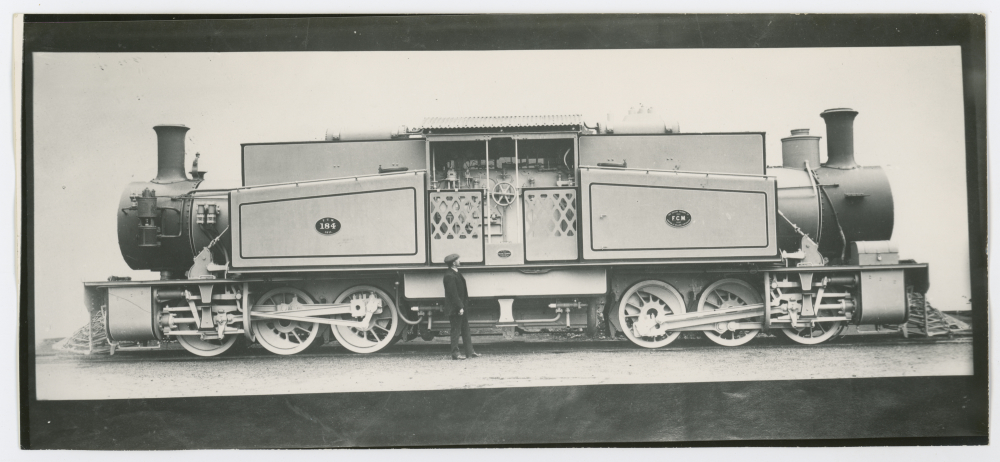
Double-Ended Ferrocarril Mexicano Locomotive No. 184

In Mexico, the Ferrocarril Mexicano (FCM) used Fairlies on a mountainous stretch of line between Mexico City and Veracruz, where 49 enormous 0-6-6-0T Fairlies weighing about 125 short tons (112 long tons; 113 t) apiece were imported from England. The largest and most powerful locomotives built there up to then, they were used until the line was electrified in the 1920s. The tractive effort figures (see table below) are notably high compared to relatively modern locomotives (such as the BR Standard Class 9F).

Rolt wrote:

"...it was the Mexican Railway that became Fairlie's most devoted adherent. Three twelve-wheeled Avonside Fairlies were built for this Company in 1871 to work traffic on the steeply graded section of the main line between Cordoba and the 7,923 ft (2,415 m). Boca del Monte, Mexico summit in the Orizaba mountains, a distance of 108 miles (174 km). So successful were they that they were the forerunners of no less than fifty Fairlies supplied to Mexico by Avonside and other British builders over a period of forty years."

Durrant took a more sceptical view:

"The largest Fairlies built were...102-short-ton (91-long-ton; 93 t) examples for the Mexicano Railway...Despite their impressive proportions, these engines were devoid of superheaters or modern valve arrangements and were soon replaced by electrification."

This table shows brief details of the locomotives. Detailed specifications can be found at steamlocomotive.com

Class	Road numbers	Date	Builder	T.E. (lb or kg)	Weight (lb or kg))	Notes
n/k	n/k	1871	Avonside	n/k	n/k	3 locomotives
n/k	n/k	n/k	n/k	n/k	n/k	19 locomotives
R-1	159-170	1889	Neilson	39,893 lb or 18,095 kg	216,994 lb or 98,427 kg	-
R-1	171-180	1902	North British	37,614 lb or 17,061 kg	222,656 lb or 100,995 kg	-
R-2	181-182	1907	North British	46,059 lb or 20,892 kg	269,024 lb or 122,027 kg	-
R-3	183-185	1911	Vulcan Foundry	59,133 lb or 26,822 kg	309,120 lb or 140,210 kg	-

Key:

- Date = building date of first locomotive in batch. Delivery may have been spread over several years
- n/k = not known
- T.E. = tractive effort

Durrant shows a photograph (credited to English Electric) of FCM number 184, built by Vulcan Foundry (VF) in 1911. This is of typically British appearance apart from the sanding dome which, curiously, is provided at one end only. This photograph of FCM number 183 shows a locomotive of distinctly American appearance. If it is one of the VF engines, it has certainly been heavily re-built.

The VF engines were almost certainly built as oil-fired. The photograph in Durrant's book looks like a works photograph showing the engine in new condition and there are rectangular tanks on top of the boilers, which was the usual arrangement on oil-fired Fairlies. Heat from the boilers kept the oil warm and prevented it from becoming too viscous in cold weather.

=== Ireland ===
The first two Fairlies, which belonged in Ireland, was a 0-4-4T tank engine for the Great Southern and Western Railway, which entered service in 1869. It was designed by Alexander McDonnell. These locomotives were standard, single-ended ones. The unique pivoting power bogie was situated right underneath the engine chassis. The design became the direct inspiration for the famous Mason Bogie locomotives in the United States. These two Irish engines were the very first locomotives in the entire region of United Kingdom to use the advanced Walschaerts valve gear, because the pivoting Fairlie bogie left open space between the frames.

=== New Zealand ===
In New Zealand, the R class and S class single Fairlies and the B class and E class double Fairlies were ordered in the 1870s for use on the narrow-gauge (3 ft 6 in or 1,067 mm) system built under Julius Vogel's 1870 "Great Public Works" programme to open up the country. Three of the S class Fairlies were sold to Western Australian Government Railways in 1891.https://www.r28.org.nz/ An entire Fairlie engine is located in the town of Reefton, on the South Island¨s West Coast, and a group is working to restore it.

=== Russia ===
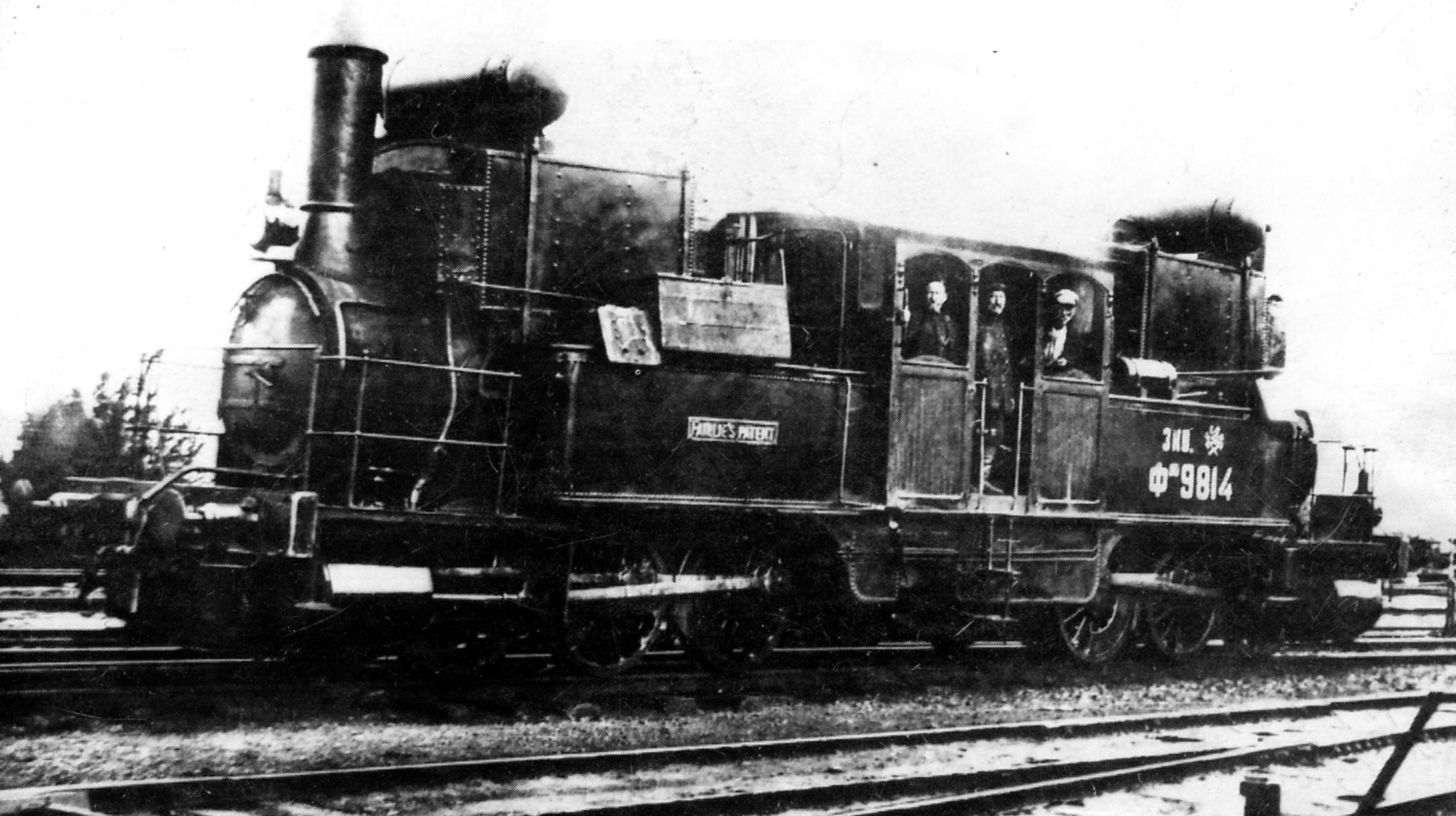
Russian F series oil-fired Fairlie built under licence in 1884

In Russia, Fairlies were used on a 3 ft 6 in (1,067 mm) gauge Imperial Linvy Railway between Tambov and Saratov (1871–1887) and on Surami Pass of the Transcaucasian Railway (from 1872). These locomotives, like the ones used in Mexico were an 0-6-6-0T configuration. The first of them were built in England (Avonside Engine Company, Yorkshire Engine Company and Sharp, Stewart and Company), the second tranche were made by German factories (1879), the last – 17 for the Russian State Railways by the Kolomensky Works, Kolomna (1884) under licence. The largest locomotives weighed 90 tons and were oil-fired. In 1912 all Fairlies in Russia were included in series F and used until 1934, when the line through Surami pass was electrified.

=== India and Burma ===
In 1879, the Avonside Engine Company built 25 Double Fairlies intended for service in the Third Anglo-Afghan War. The order was cancelled in 1880, but 17 locomotives had already been built and they were purchased by India, though one was lost at sea during transit to India. The remaining locomotives worked on the Bolān Pass Railway but were not successful and were put into storage in 1887. Ten went to Burma in 1896 and four others were sent to the Nilgiri Mountain Railway in 1907. The Nilgiri locomotives worked there until at least 1914.

== Problems with the design ==
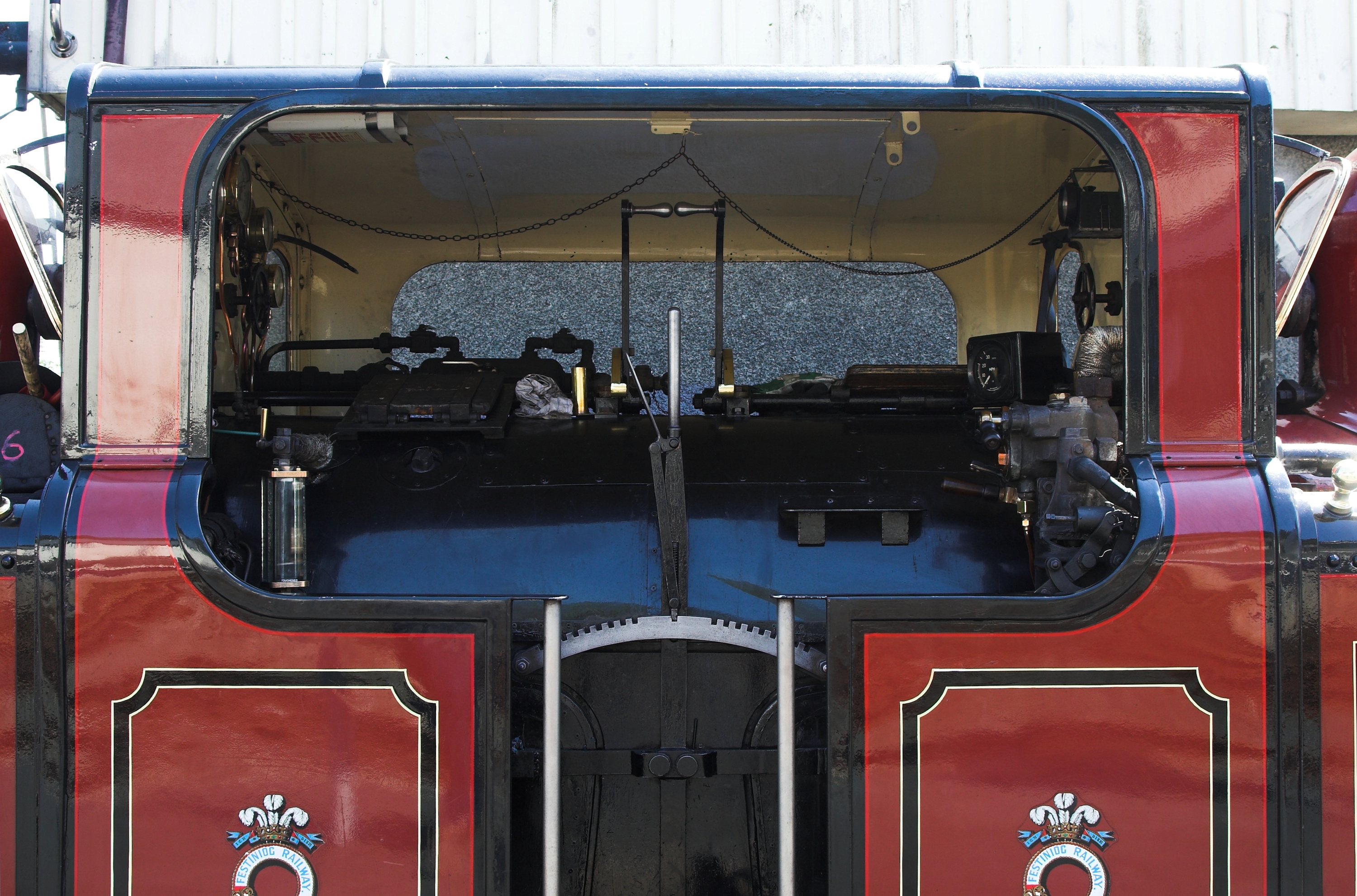
David Lloyd George cab at Blaenau Ffestiniog

=== Fuel and water ===
Capacity for fuel and water is limited by the layout of the locomotive. Fairlie's design has less room for fuel supplies than a normal tank locomotive, that can be fitted with a bunker at the back of the cab. Solid fuel can't be carried in a tender because there is no access from the central cab. As was later the case with Bulleid's Leader class locomotives, limited fuel supplies would not have been a problem if fuel oil had been used instead of coal. Some of the large Fairlies for Mexico (see above) were oil-fired and oil-firing has, in recent times, been used on the Ffestiniog Railway.

=== Steam pipes ===
The flexible steam pipes to and from the cylinders of each swivelling engine were prone to leakage which wasted power. These problems were partially solved. It is recorded by Rolt that difficulties encountered in 1909 with the design and construction of steam-tight flexible steam connections for the Garratt locomotive were solved by Beyer, Peacock & Company's designers after studying the spherical steam joints on a Fairlie locomotive built for the Ffestiniog Railway.

=== Power bogies ===
Unpowered wheels on a steam locomotive reduce its tendency to wander or 'hunt' when rolling on straight track, and lead the locomotive into curves, thereby reducing derailments. Early Fairlies had a tendency to be rough on the track, and more prone to derailment than they should have been. The Festiniog Railway's first Fairlie Little Wonder was worn out after less than twenty years' use. To a large extent the problem was not the use of power bogies but faults in their design and especially the absence of weights on the trailing ends of the bogies to counterbalance the cylinders. Subsequent FR engines were much easier on the track. All FR Fairlies have had a reputation for a smooth footplate ride when compared with the original George England and Co. built 0-4-0 engines.

=== Visibility ===
The driver is on one side of the firebox and the fireman on the other. As a result, the locomotive is left-hand drive going in one direction and right-hand drive in the other. This potentially reduces the visibility of signals.

== Single Fairlie locomotive ==
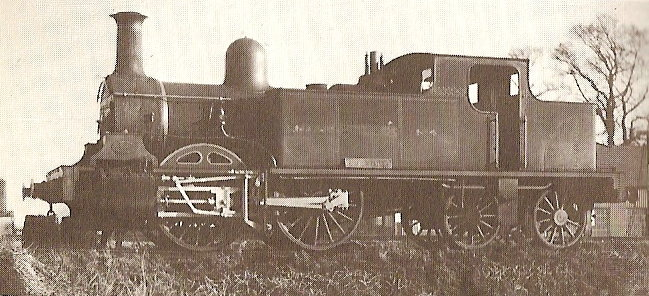
Swindon Marlborough & Andover Railway Single Fairlie 0-4-4T of 1878

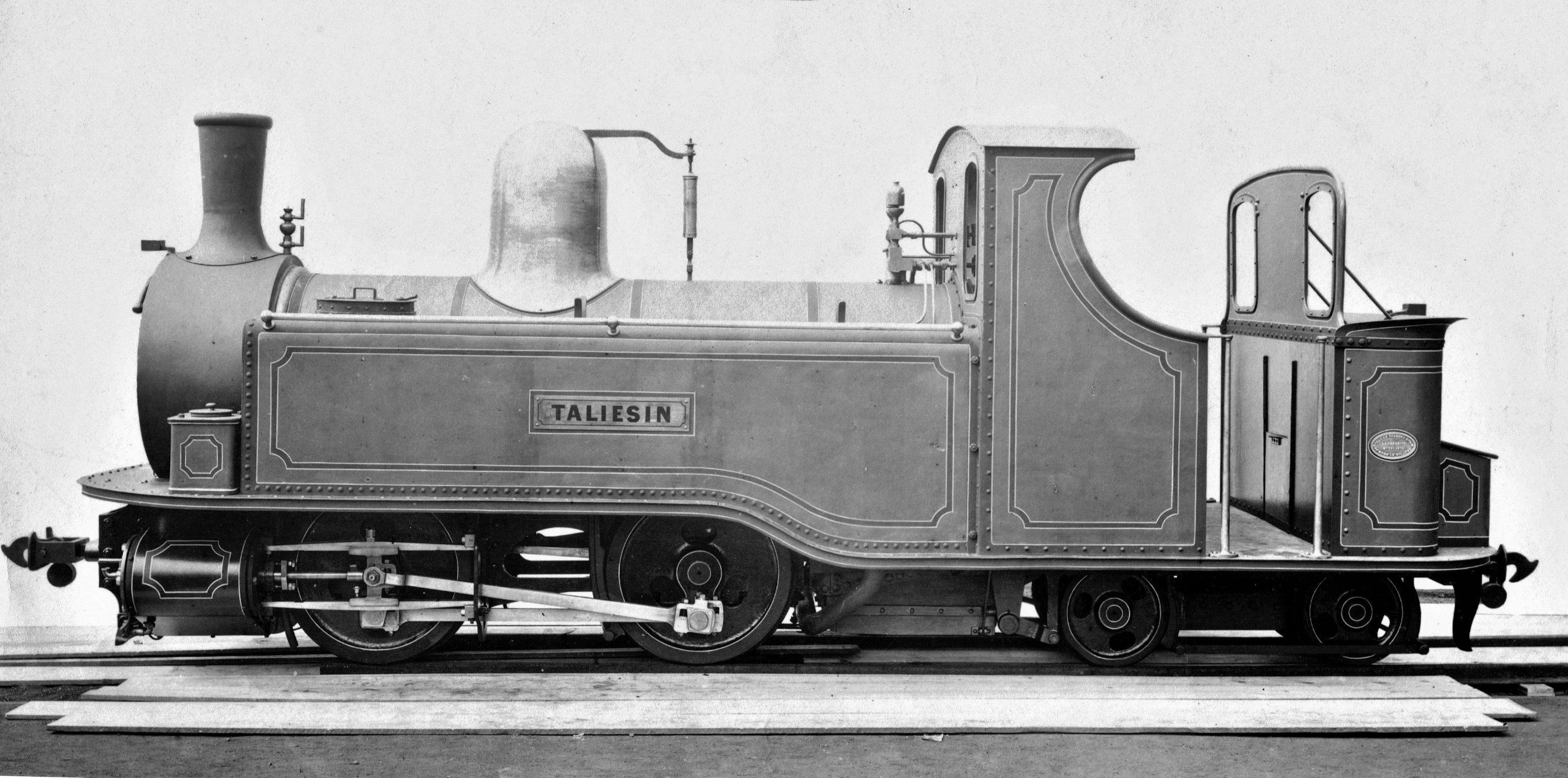
FR Taliesin works photograph 1876

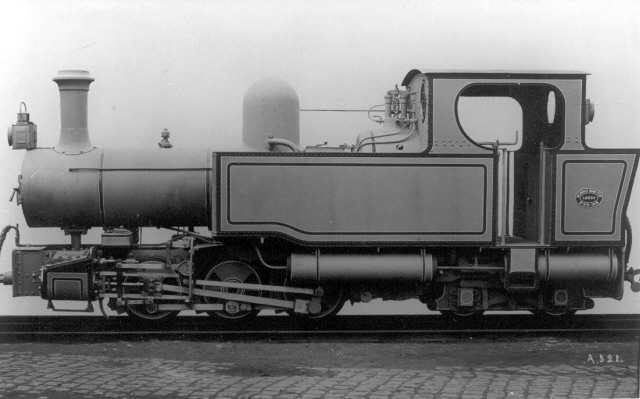
Single Fairlie Gowrie works photo of 1908

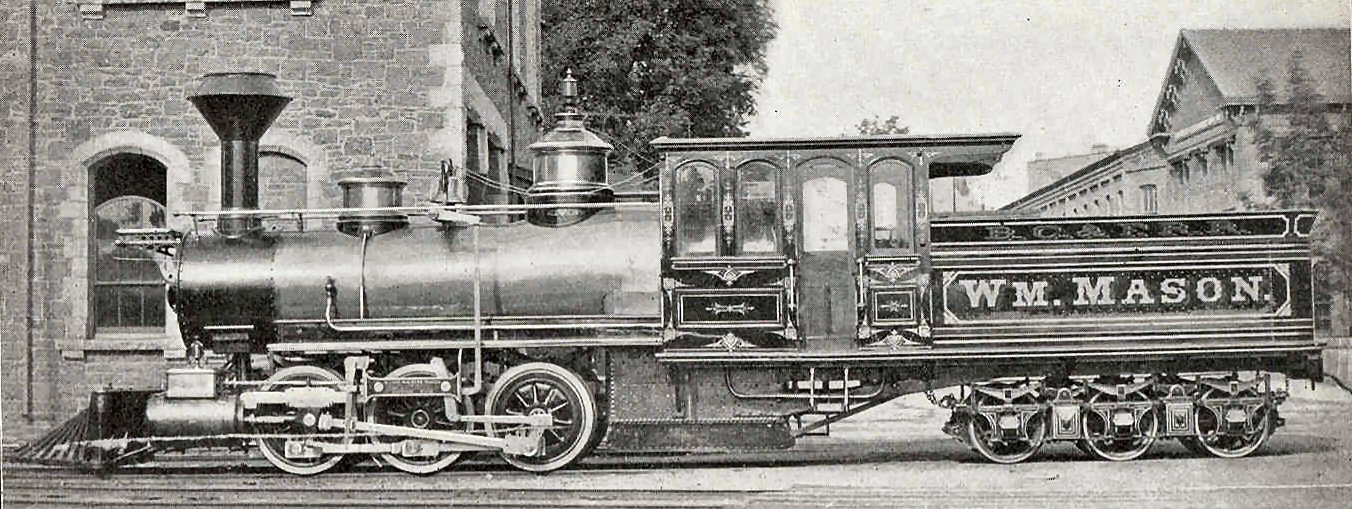
Mason Bogie steam locomotive "Wm. Mason". Builder's photo from 1874

A variation of the Fairlie that enjoyed some popularity, especially in the United States, was the single Fairlie, essentially half a double Fairlie, with one boiler, a cab at one end, and a single articulated power bogie combined with an unpowered bogie under the cab, maintaining the ability to negotiate sharp turns. This design abandoned the bidirectional nature of the double Fairlie but gained back the ability to have a large bunker and water tank behind the cab, and the possibility of using a trailing tender if necessary. The single conventional boiler made maintenance cheaper and did away with the crew's separation.

The first Single Fairlie locomotive was an 0-4-4T designed and constructed by Alexander McDonnell for the Great Southern & Western Railway in 1869.

The design was especially popular with William Mason, Fairlie's licensee in the United States, who built 146 or so Mason Bogie locomotives, which were a variant on this design. In the UK, a single Fairlie 0-4-4T was used by the Swindon, Marlborough and Andover Railway and three 0-6-4Ts by the North Wales Narrow Gauge Railways. As well as their iconic double Fairlies, the Ffestiniog railway also has a 0-4-4T single Fairlie loco, the power bogie of which is essentially the same as those used by their double Fairlies.

In both the UK and the USA, single Fairlies were the first locomotives in each country to use the European Walschaerts valve gear. The Stephenson link gear, which was usual at the time, used multiple eccentrics between the frames but the Walschaerts gear was mounted outboard of the frames and connecting rods. This was advantageous because the Fairlie system required this space between the frames for the bogie pivot.

== Péchot-Bourdon locomotive ==
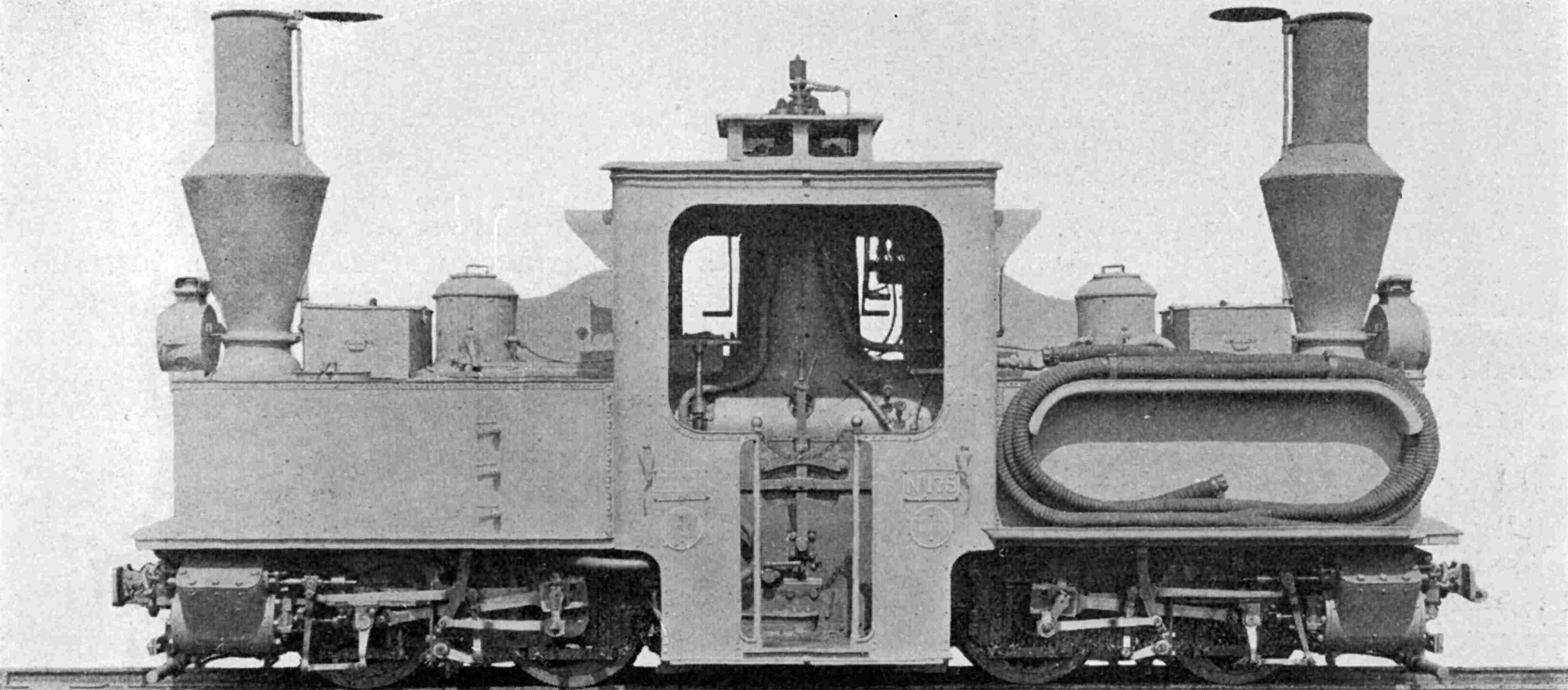
Baldwin-built Péchot-Bourdon locomotive, driver's side

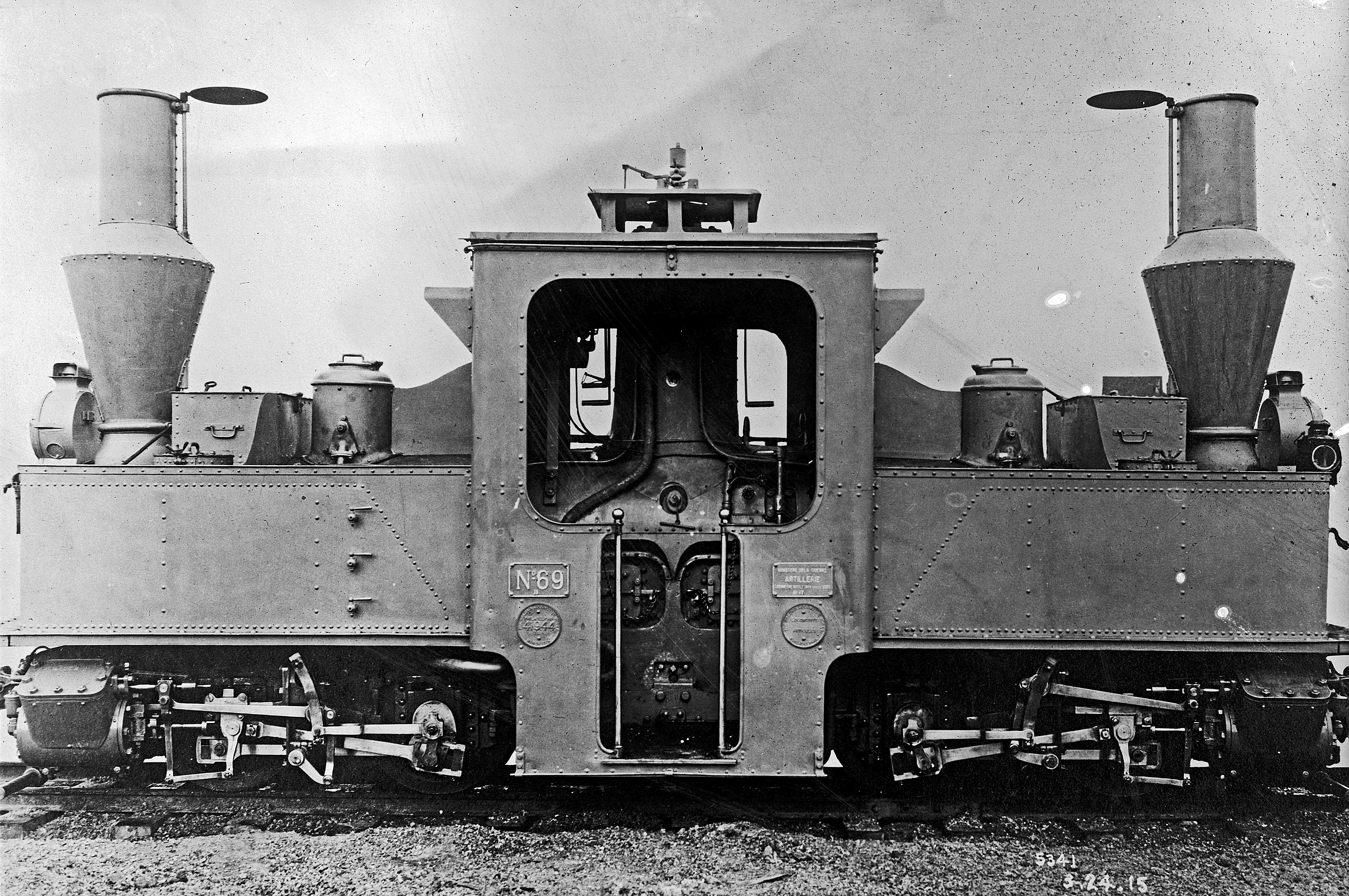
Baldwin-built Péchot-Bourdon locomotive, fireman's side

The Péchot-Bourdon locomotive was the final development of the Fairlie type. The Péchot-Bourdon was developed by Captain Péchot of the French artillery to operate on 600 mm (1 ft 11 5/8 in) gauge railways associated with field artillery and fortresses. The design was chosen with the belief that if one boiler or set of valve gear was damaged by enemy fire, the loco could continue to operate. The primary difference between a Fairlie and the Péchot-Bourdon is that the latter only had one steam dome. Only one design was constructed, an 0-4-4-0T. About fifty examples were constructed in 1906, and a further 280 were constructed during World War I, some by the American Baldwin Locomotive Works.

Preservation

Two examples are preserved, one in Frankfurter Feldbahnmuseum on loan from Dresden Transport Museum, Germany, and one in Serbia at Pozega Railway Museum.

Models

A 1:32 scale model of the Péchot-Bourdon locomotive is produced by Scalelink.

== Modified Fairlie locomotive ==
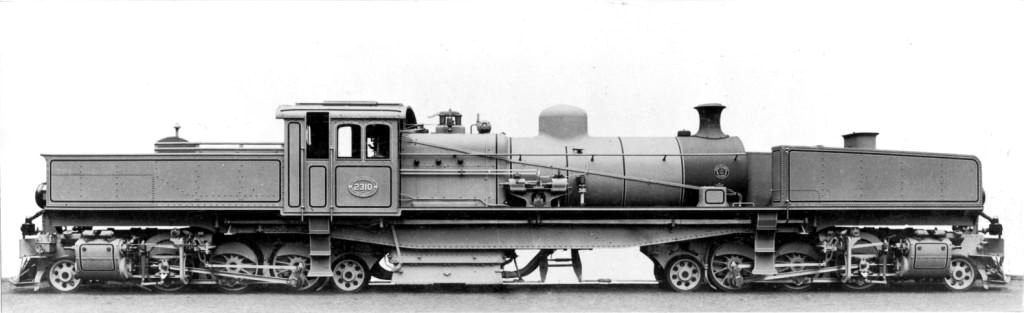
Builder’s works picture of South African Class FC Modified Fairlie no. 2310

The Modified Fairlie was introduced by the North British Locomotive Company to the South African Railways in 1924. It was similar in appearance to a Garratt locomotive but the boiler, fuel and water tanks were all mounted on a single frame which was pivoted on the power bogies. This arrangement differs from the Garratt in which the fuel and water tanks are mounted directly on the power bogies.

== Fairlies today ==
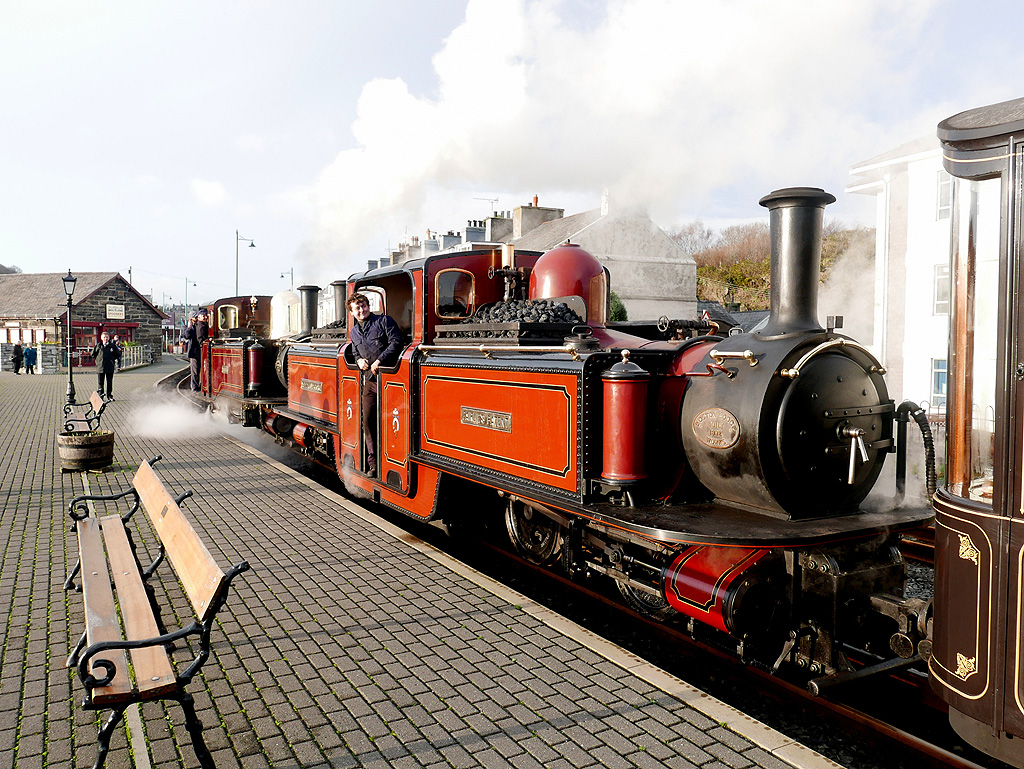
Locomotives Taliesin and David Lloyd George

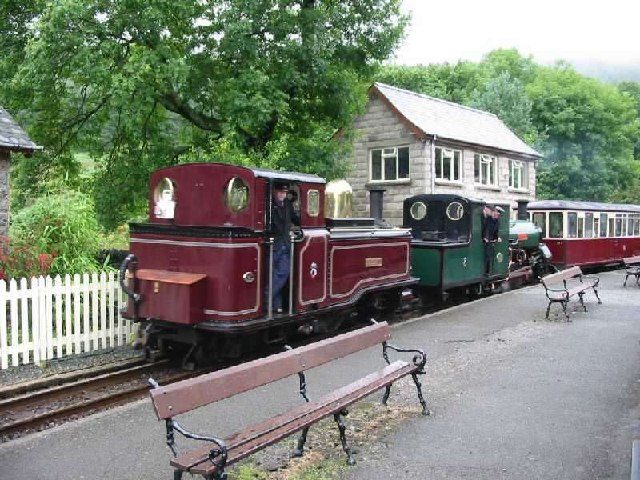
Single Fairlie Taliesin (nearest camera)

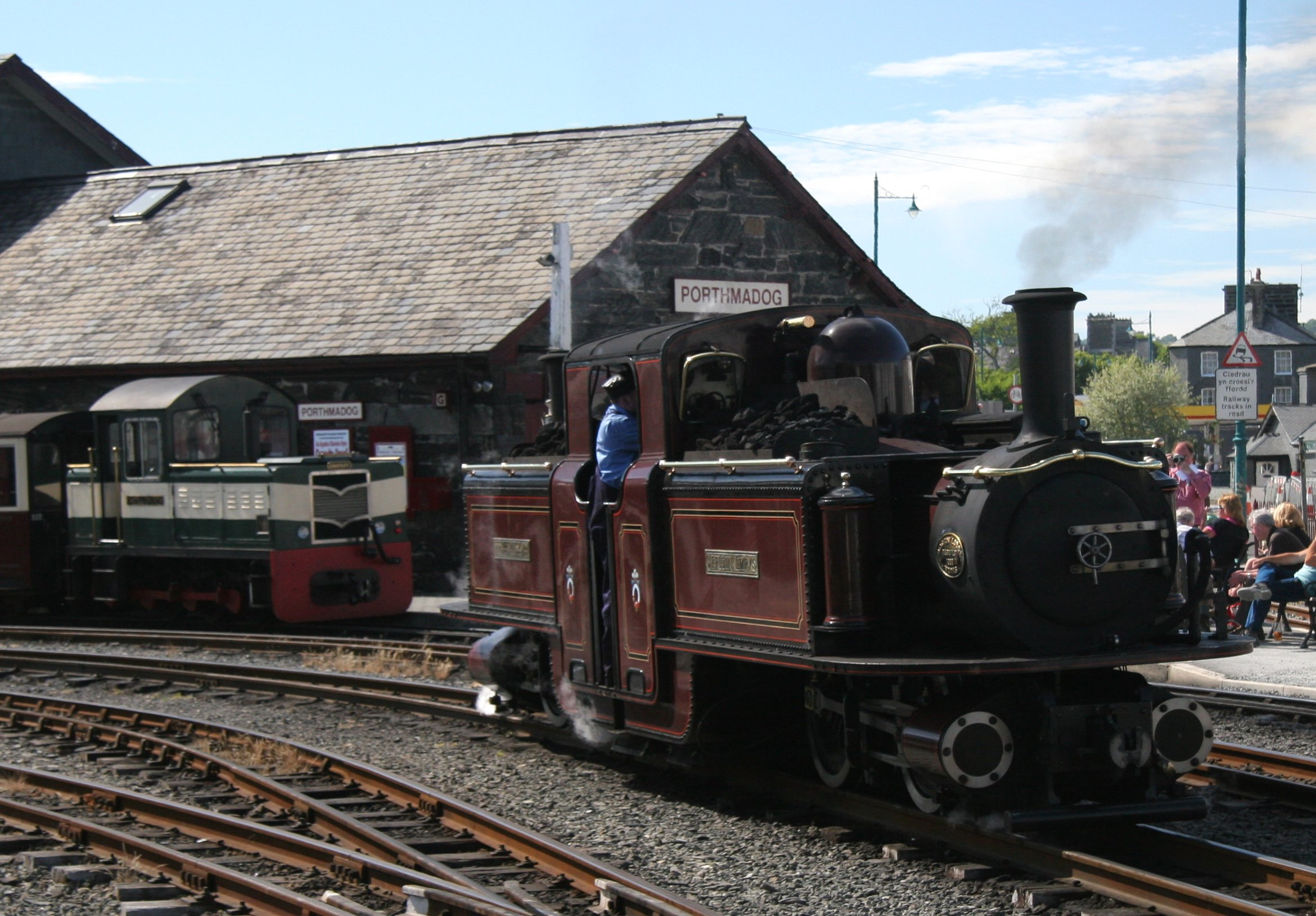
Double Fairlie Merddin Emrys at Porthmadog

=== Operational ===
The Ffestiniog Railway in Wales still uses Fairlie locomotives. It has three double Fairlies in running condition. The most recent of these, James Spooner, was built in 2023 in the Ffestiniog's Boston Lodge works on the 153rd anniversary of Little Wonder's trials of 1870. Merddin Emrys of 1879 was the first engine to be built at Boston Lodge. The Ffestiniog also owned and operated Taliesin, a single Fairlie, from 1876 to 1927. It was scrapped in 1935 but a replica was built at Boston Lodge in 1999.

The Fairlies on the Ffestiniog Railway were designed to burn coal. Following trials in 1971, in common with most other Ffestiniog engines, they were modified to burn oil. In 2005, Earl of Merioneth was converted to coal having been built as an oil burner. The success of this conversion resulted in Merddin Emrys, the oldest of the FR Fairlies, being converted back to coal burning in 2007.

The oldest Fairlie still in operation is a Mason Bogie preserved at the Henry Ford Museum in Dearborn, Michigan. The 0-6-4T locomotive was built in 1873 and still hauls passengers on a tourist train during the summer season.

=== Non-operational ===
Ffestiniog locomotive Livingston Thompson at the National Railway Museum, York

Double Fairlie locomotive The Earl of Merioneth is now preserved, at Boston Lodge works where it was built in 1979. It was withdrawn from service on the 8 April 2018. Double Fairlie Josephine (Dunedin & Port Chalmers Railway #2, NZR E 175, PWD #504) is preserved at Dunedin, New Zealand's, Otago Settlers' Museum, and R 28 a single Fairlie, at Reefton. R 28 is the only original British Single Fairlie to have survived, the Festinog's Taliesin is a replica built in 1999. The remains of another, R class number 271, was dumped at Oamaru to protect the railway yards against coastal erosion in 1930, and has since passed into the ownership of the Oamaru Steam & Rail Restoration Society. Two more R class boilers, and two power bogies from one each B and E class double Fairlies are held by the Canterbury Railway Society at its Ferrymead Railway in Christchurch.

A double Fairlie tramway type engine is also preserved in Eastern Germany, and one of the original Ffestiniog locomotives, Livingston Thompson of 1885, is in the National Railway Museum in York.

== In fiction ==
In the children's television series Thomas & Friends, based on the Rev. W. Awdry's The Railway Series, Mighty Mac and Little Giant is a double Fairlie on the narrow-gauge Skarloey Railway.

== See also ==
- Articulated locomotive
- South West African twin locomotive

== Bibliography ==
- Abbott, Rowland A. S. (1970). The Fairlie Locomotive. Newton Abbot, Devon, UK: David & Charles. ISBN 978-0-7153-4902-1.
- Binns, Donald (2001). Fairlie Articulated Locomotives: Vol 1 - On the American Continent. Skipton: Trackside Publications. ISBN 978-1-900095-16-7.
- Fairlie, R.F. (1969) [1864.]. Locomotive Engines, What they are and What they ought to be. London: John King & Co., 693, Queen Street, E.C. — Reprinted and published by Festiniog Railway Company (1969).
- Fairlie, R.F. (1982) [1872]. Railways or No Railways - The Battle of the Gauges Renewed. London: Effingham Wilson, Royal Exchange — Reproduced by Railhead Publications, Ohio (c1982).
- Stewart, W. W. (1974). When Steam was King. Wellington: A. H. & A. W. Reed Ltd. ISBN 978-0-589-00382-1.
