= NZR B class (1874) =

Class of New Zealand steam locomotives

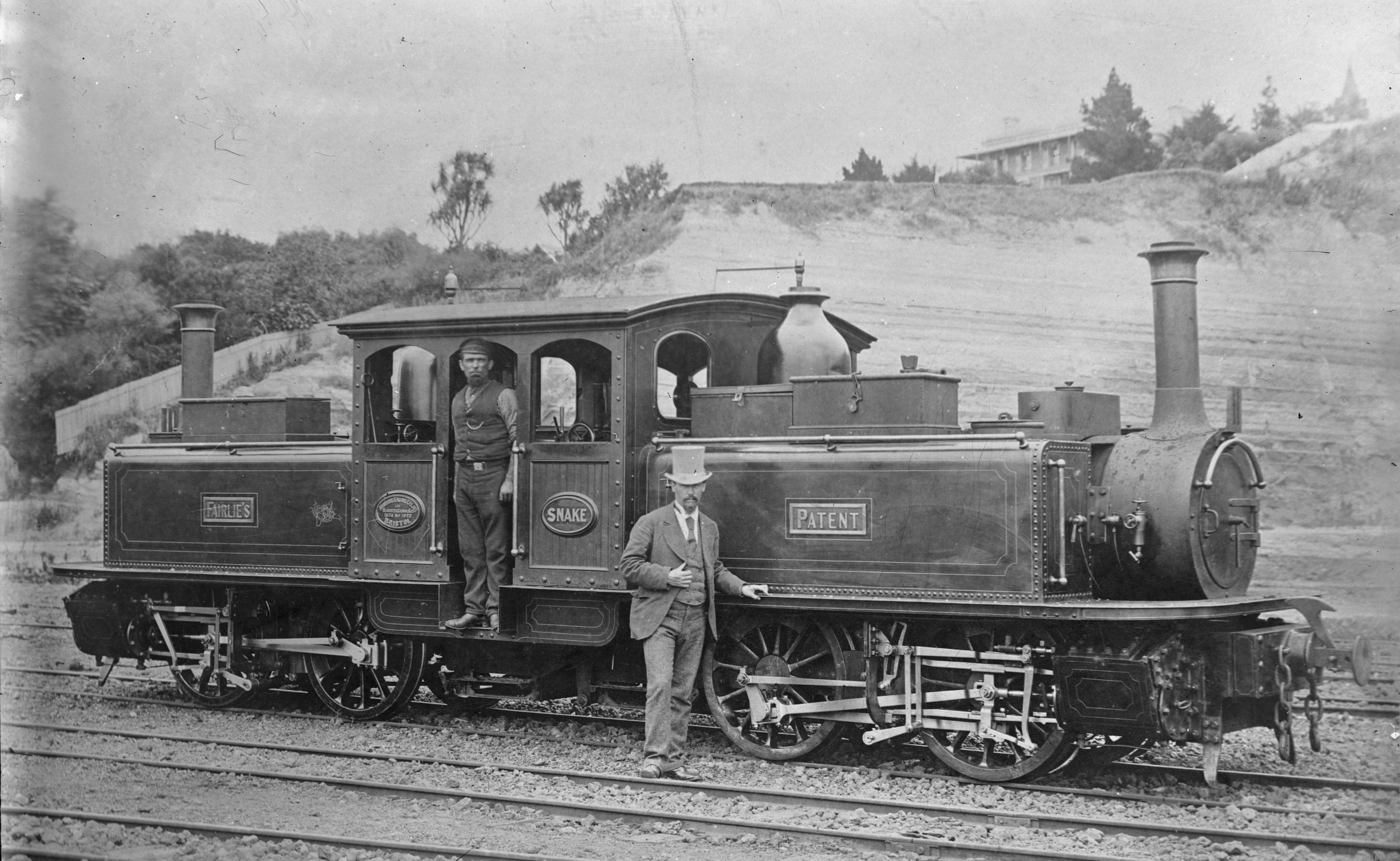
- Snake, a 0-4-4-0T Double Fairlie, B class steam locomotive "B" 238
Type and origin
- Power type: Steam
- Builder: Avonside Engine Co., UK
- Build date: 1874
- Total produced: 2
Specifications
- Configuration
  - Whyte: 0-4-4-0T (Double Fairlie)
- Gauge: 3 ft 6 in (1,067 mm)
- Driver dia.: 3 ft 3 in (0.991 m)
- Length: 31 ft 2 in (9.50 m)
- Loco weight: 28 long tons 0 cwt (62,700 lb or 28.4 t); 28 long tons 0 hundredweight (28.4 t; 31.4 short tons)
- Fuel capacity: 1 long ton 14 cwt (3,800 lb or 1.7 t); 1 long ton 14 hundredweight (1.7 t; 1.9 short tons)
- Water cap.: 750 imp gal (3,400 L; 900 US gal)
- Firebox
  - Grate area: 15.0 sq ft (1.39 m^{2})
- Boiler pressure: 130 lbf/in^{2} (900 kPa)
- Heating surface: 770 sq ft (72 m^{2})
- Cylinders: 4
- Cylinder size: 9 in × 16 in (229 mm × 406 mm)
Performance figures
- Tractive effort: 6,912 lbf (30.75 kN)
Career
- Operators: NZGR
- Numbers: 10, 27
- First run: 1874-1875
- Withdrawn: 1890–1896
- Disposition: Both scrapped

The NZR B class of 1874 was the first of two steam locomotive classes to be designated as B by the Railways Department that then oversaw New Zealand's national rail network (the second B class was introduced in 1899). Ordered from the Avonside Engine Company in 1874, the locomotives were of the Double Fairlie type and were the first British-built locomotives to feature Walschaerts valve gear. They were not the first Double Fairlies to operate in New Zealand, as the first two members of the E class had commenced operations in 1872.

== Introduction ==
The first member of the B class, nicknamed Snake, was introduced in September 1874 and it worked in Auckland; it was followed by its partner Lady Mordaunt on 5 April 1875, which was based in Otago. This locomotive had been ordered by the Otago Provincial Council to work the lightly laid Awamoko branch, but advice received by the council before it an arrived was that it was too heavy. It was sent to work elsewhere and two more locomotives were ordered instead.

In 1876, the Provinces of New Zealand were abolished and a national locomotive classification method was established, and it first split these locomotives into separate classes. The Auckland-based Snake became the sole member of the B class in 1876; Otago locomotives were omitted from the national classification initially, but in 1877, it was necessary to include them as the Main South Line linked the southern provinces. Despite Lady Mordaunt being almost identical to Snake, it was classified as the sole member of the NZR N class as Otago locomotives were classified by an inverse ranking of locomotive weight while all others were classified by cylinder diameter and the number of wheels. Both of these methods of allocating classifications quickly proved impractical and were discarded; in 1879, Lady Mordaunt was reclassified as B class like Snake and they bore the classification for the remainder of their working lives.

The numbers allocated to the locomotives did not stay the same all their lives either. For example, Snake was initially B 10, then B 51, and finally B 238.

== Disposal ==
The two Bs proved unpopular with crews and failed to generate sufficient power, leading to their early withdrawal from service., Snake was retired in 1890 not long after receiving the number of B 238, while Lady Mordaunt lasted another six years. Three of the locomotives four power bogies were used under NZR-built steam cranes, nos 101-103. With both locomotives removed from the Railways Department's books, the B classification was free to be used again in 1899; the N classification was also re-used after it was vacated by Lady Mordaunt, by the N class of 1885.

== See also ==
- NZR E class (1872)
- NZR R class
- NZR S class
- Locomotives of New Zealand
