= List of compositions by Benjamin Britten =

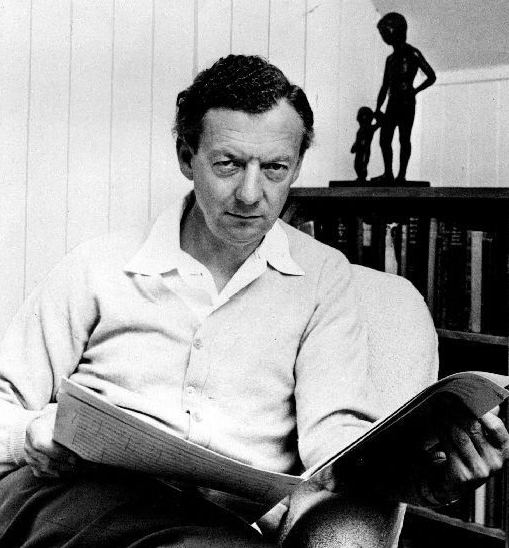
Benjamin Britten in 1968

This list of compositions includes all the published works by English composer Benjamin Britten with opus number.

== By genre ==
=== Operas ===
Paul Bunyan, Op. 17:

- Operetta in two acts, 114'.
- Libretto by W. H. Auden, after the American folktale.
- Premiered on 5 May 1941 at Brander Matthews Hall, New York.
- Published by Faber Music.

Peter Grimes, Op. 33:

- Opera in a prologue and three acts, 147'.
- Libretto by Montagu Slater, after the poem The Borough by George Crabbe.
- Premiered on 7 June 1945 at Sadler's Wells, London.
- Published by Boosey & Hawkes.

The Rape of Lucretia, Op. 37:

- Opera in two acts, 107'.
- Libretto by Ronald Duncan, after the play Le Viol de Lucrèce by André Obey.
- Premiered on 12 July 1946 at Glyndebourne.
- Published by Boosey & Hawkes.

Albert Herring, Op. 39:

- Comic opera in three acts, 137'.
- Libretto by Eric Crozier, loosely after the short story Le Rosier de Mme. Husson by Guy de Maupassant.
- Premiered on 20 June 1947 at Glyndebourne.
- Published by Boosey & Hawkes.

The Beggar's Opera, Op. 43:

- Ballad opera, 108'.
- Libretto after the ballad opera by John Gay.
- Premiered on 24 May 1948 at the Cambridge Arts Theatre.
- Published by Boosey & Hawkes.

Let's Make an Opera (The Little Sweep), Op. 45:

- An Entertainment for Young People, 130'.
- Libretto by Eric Crozier.
- Premiered on 14 June 1949 at Jubilee Hall, Aldeburgh Festival.
- Published by Boosey & Hawkes.

Billy Budd, Op. 50:

- Opera in four acts, 162'.
- Libretto by E. M. Forster and Eric Crozier, after the novella by Herman Melville.
- Premiered on 1 December 1951 at the Royal Opera House, London.
- Published by Boosey & Hawkes.

Billy Budd (revised):

- Opera in two acts, 158'.
- Premiered on 9 January 1964 at the Royal Opera House, London.
- Published by Boosey & Hawkes.

Gloriana, Op. 53:

- Opera in three acts, 148'.
- Libretto by William Plomer, after Elizabeth and Essex by Lytton Strachey.
- Premiered on 8 June 1953 at the Royal Opera House, London.
- Published by Boosey & Hawkes.

The Turn of the Screw, Op. 54:

- Opera in a prologue and two acts, 101'.
- Libretto by Myfanwy Piper, after the novella by Henry James.
- Premiered on 14 September 1954 at Teatro La Fenice, Venice.
- Published by Boosey & Hawkes.

Noye's Fludde, Op. 59:

- Music-theatre for community performance, 50'.
- Libretto after the Chester Miracle Play as published in English Miracle Plays, Moralities and Interludes
- Premiered on 18 June 1958 at Orford Church, Aldeburgh Festival.
- Published by Boosey & Hawkes.

A Midsummer Night's Dream, Op. 64:

- Opera in three acts, 144'.
- Libretto by the composer and Peter Pears, after the play by Shakespeare.
- Premiered on 11 June 1960 at Jubilee Hall, Aldeburgh Festival.
- Published by Boosey & Hawkes.

Owen Wingrave, Op. 85:

- Opera for television in two acts, 106'.
- Libretto by Myfanwy Piper, after the short story by Henry James.
- Premiered on 16 May 1971 in a BBC2 TV broadcast. First staged on 10 May 1973 at the Royal Opera House, London.
- Published by Faber Music.

Death in Venice, Op. 88:

- Opera in two acts, 145'.
- Libretto by Myfanwy Piper, after the novella by Thomas Mann.
- Premiered on 16 June 1973, Snape Maltings, Aldeburgh Festival.
- Published by Faber Music.

=== Church parables ===
- Curlew River (Op. 71; 1964), based on a Japanese Noh play
- The Burning Fiery Furnace (Op. 77; 1966), after the Book of Daniel, Chapter 3
- The Prodigal Son (Op. 81; 1968), after the Gospel of Luke, Chapter 15

=== Ballets ===
- Plymouth Town (ballet for small orchestra; 1931)
- The Prince of the Pagodas (Op. 57; 1956)
- Les Sylphides after Chopin (1940)

=== Orchestral ===
- "Two Portraits" for string orchestra (1930). No. 2 is subtitled "E.B.B" – his own initials, and thus a self-portrait (also arr. for viola and strings). No. 3 was unrealised.
- Sinfonietta, Op. 1, for five winds and five strings (1932), revised for chamber orchestra (1936)
- Simple Symphony, Op. 4, for string orchestra (1934)
- Soirées musicales, Op. 9, after Rossini (1936)
- Russian Funeral, for brass and percussion (1936)
- King Arthur (suite for orchestra, arranged from incidental music for a BBC Radio production by Paul Hindmarsh, 1937/ 2005)
- Variations on a Theme of Frank Bridge, Op. 10, for string orchestra (1937)
- Mont Juic, Op. 12, a suite of Catalan Dances, jointly composed with Lennox Berkeley (1937)
- Canadian Carnival, Op. 19 (1939)
- Incidental music to J.B. Priestley's Johnson over Jordan (1939)
- Sinfonia da Requiem, Op. 20 (1940)
- Matinées musicales, Op. 24, after Rossini (1941)
- An American Overture, Op. 27 (1941)
- Prelude and Fugue for 18 Strings, Op. 29 (1943)
- Four Sea Interludes and Passacaglia from Peter Grimes, Op. 33a & 33b, for orchestra (1945)
- The Young Person's Guide to the Orchestra, Op. 34 (1946)
- Occasional Overture, Op. 38 (1946)
- Men of Goodwill – variations on a Christmas carol (1947)
- Variations on an Elizabethan Theme, jointly composed with Lennox Berkeley, Arthur Oldham, Humphrey Searle, Michael Tippett and William Walton (1953)
- Symphonic Suite from Gloriana, Op. 53a (1954)
- Suite on English Folk Tunes, A Time There Was..., Op. 90, for chamber orchestra (1966/1974)

=== Concertante ===
- Rondo Concertante for piano and strings (1930)
- Double Concerto for Violin, Viola and Orchestra (1932). "Instrumentation...virtually 100% Britten" (Matthews, Erato sleeve note, 1999 – Colin Matthews realised the orchestration).
- Piano Concerto, Op. 13 (1938; rev. 1945, the original third movement – Recitative and Aria – replaced by an Impromptu)
- Violin Concerto, Op. 15 (1939; rev. 1958)
- Young Apollo, Op. 16, for piano, string quartet and string orchestra (1939)
- Diversions for Piano Left Hand and Orchestra, Op. 21 (1940; rev. 1954)
- Scottish Ballad, Op. 26, for two pianos and orchestra (1941)
- Clarinet Concerto (incomplete: 1st movement only, 1942/3, orch. by Colin Matthews, who later added two further movements from 1940s Britten sketches, incl. Sonata for Orchestra; resulting work, Movements for a Clarinet Concerto, first published 2008)
- In memoriam Dennis Brain (c. 1958), unfinished sketch for four horns and orchestra.
- Cello Symphony, Op. 68 (1963)

=== Vocal/choral orchestral ===
- Quatre Chansons Françaises for soprano and orchestra (1928)
- Two Psalms for chorus and orchestra (1931)
- Our Hunting Fathers, Op. 8, for soprano or tenor and orchestra (words by W. H. Auden and others; 1936)
- The Company of Heaven for speakers, soloists, chorus and orchestra (BBC, September 1937, not performed again until 1989)
- The World of the Spirit for speakers, SATB soloists, chorus and orchestra (BBC, May 1938)
- Ballad of Heroes, Op. 14, for tenor or soprano, chorus and orchestra (words by W. H. Auden and Randall Swingler; 1939)
- Les Illuminations, Op. 18, for soprano or tenor and strings (words by Arthur Rimbaud) (1939; three further songs, not included in the cycle, also exist — another setting also called 'Phrase', and 'Aube' and 'A une raison'; they have been orchestrated by Colin Matthews; there also exists a sketch for a further Rimbaud setting)
- Serenade for Tenor, Horn and Strings, Op. 31 (1943)
- The Ballad of Little Musgrave and Lady Barnard for male voice choir and piano (1943)
- The Rescue of Penelope for voices and orchestra (1943)
- Saint Nicolas, Op. 42, for tenor soloist, children's chorus, chorus, and orchestra (1948)
- Spring Symphony, Op. 44, for soprano, contralto, and tenor soloists, mixed chorus, boys' choir and orchestra (1949)
- Nocturne, Op. 60, for tenor, seven obbligato instruments and strings (1958)
- Cantata academica, Op. 62, for soloists, chorus and orchestra (1959)
- War Requiem, Op. 66, for soprano, tenor and baritone soloists, chamber ensemble, boys' chorus, mixed chorus, and orchestra (1961)
- Cantata misericordium, Op. 69, for tenor and baritone soloists, small chorus, string quartet, string orchestra, piano, harp, timpani (1963)
- Phaedra, Op. 93, for mezzo-soprano, cello, harpsichord, percussion, and string orchestra (words by Robert Lowell; after Jean Racine's Phèdre; 1975)
- Praise we great men for soloists, chorus and orchestra (words by Edith Sitwell; 1976. Completed by Colin Matthews, 1985)
- Welcome Ode, Op. 95, for young people's voices and orchestra (1976)

=== Vocal ===
- Beware! Three Early Songs for voice and piano (1) "Beware!" (words by Henry Wadsworth Longfellow; 1922) (2) "O that I had ne'er been Married" (words by Robert Burns; 1922) (3) "Epitaph: The Clerk" (words by Herbert Asquith; 1926; rev. 1968, published 1985
- Tit for Tat for voice and piano (words by Walter de la Mare; 1928–31; (1) "A Song of Enchantment" (2) "Autumn" (3) "Silver" (4) "Vigil" (5) "Tit for Tat"; rev. and published 1969; premiered by John Shirley-Quirk and the composer at the 1969 Aldeburgh Festival)
- The Birds (Belloc; 1929, rev. 1934)
- On this Island, Op. 11, for high voice and piano (1937) (words by W. H. Auden)
- Fish in the Unruffled Lakes (1937-1947) (words by W. H. Auden – includes songs originally intended for, but ultimate not used in, On this Island)
- Cabaret Songs for medium voice and piano (words by W. H. Auden: "Tell Me the Truth About Love", "Funeral Blues", "Johnny", and "Calypso"; 1940)
- Seven Sonnets of Michelangelo, Op. 22, for tenor and piano (1940)
- The Holy Sonnets of John Donne, Op. 35, for tenor and piano (1945)
- Canticle I: My beloved is mine and I am his, Op. 40, for high voice and piano (one of the Canticles; 1947)
- A Charm of Lullabies, Op. 41, for mezzo-soprano and piano (1947)
- Canticle II: Abraham and Isaac, Op. 51, for alto (or countertenor), tenor, and piano (one of the Canticles; 1952)
- Canticle III: Still falls the rain, Op. 55, for tenor, horn and piano (words by Edith Sitwell; one of the Canticles; 1954)
- Winter Words, Op. 52, for tenor and piano, poetry by Thomas Hardy (1954)
- The Heart of the Matter for narrator, tenor, horn, and piano (1956)
- Songs from the Chinese, Op. 58, for soprano or tenor and guitar, Op. 58 (translations by Arthur Waley; 1957)
- Sechs Hölderlin-Fragmente, Op. 61, for tenor and piano (1958)
- Songs and Proverbs of William Blake, Op. 74, for baritone and piano (1965)
- The Poet's Echo, Op. 76, for soprano or tenor and piano (words by Alexander Pushkin; 1965)
- Who Are These Children?, Op. 84, for tenor and piano (words by William Soutar; 1969)
- Canticle IV: The Journey of the Magi, Op. 86, for countertenor, tenor, baritone, and piano (one of the Canticles; 1971)
- Canticle V: The Death of Saint Narcissus, Op. 89, for tenor and harp (one of the Canticles; 1974)
- A Birthday Hansel, Op. 92, for high voice and harp (1975)
- Eight books of Folksong Arrangements from the British Isles and France, for voice and piano, guitar and harp
- Britten's Purcell Realizations, many realizations of songs by Henry Purcell for voice(s) and piano

=== Choral ===
- A Hymn to the Virgin for chorus and soli (1930; revised 1934)
- Christ's Nativity for unaccompanied chorus (1931)
- A Boy Was Born, Op. 3, for children's chorus and mixed choir (1933; revised 1955)
- Jubilate Deo in E♭ for chorus and organ (published posthumously; 1934)
- Te Deum in C for treble solo, chorus, trumpet, and organ (1934)
- Friday Afternoons, Op. 7, for children's voices and piano (1935)
- Advance Democracy for unaccompanied choir (1938)
- A.M.D.G. (Ad Majorem Dei Gloriam), seven settings of Gerard Manley Hopkins for unaccompanied SATB (1939)
- Hymn to St Cecilia, Op. 27, for unaccompanied choir (poem by W. H. Auden; 1942)
- A Ceremony of Carols, Op. 28, for treble voices and harp (1942); an alternative arrangement for mixed voices and harp (or piano) is popular as well
- Rejoice in the Lamb, Op. 30, for four soloists, choir, and organ (text by Christopher Smart; 1943)
- Festival Te Deum, Op. 32, in E for chorus and organ (1944)
- A Wedding anthem 'Amo Ergo Sum' , Op. 46, for soprano, tenor, SATB and organ (1949)
- Five Flower Songs, Op. 47, for SATB (1950)
- Hymn to St Peter, Op. 56a, for treble soloist, mixed chorus and organ (1955)
- Antiphon, Op. 56b, for SATB and organ (1955)
- Missa Brevis, Op. 63, for boys' voices and organ (1959)
- Jubilate Deo for chorus and organ (1961)
- Fancie, for unison voices and piano (1961)
- A Hymn of St Columba for chorus and organ (1962)
- Voices for Today, Op. 75, for children's chorus, mixed chorus and organ ad lib (1965)
- The Golden Vanity, Op. 78, for five boy soloists, treble chorus and piano (1966)
- The Building of the House, Op. 79, for chorus or organ or brass and orchestra (1967)
- Children's Crusade, Op. 82, for nine boy soloists and chorus, percussion, organ and two pianos (text by Bertolt Brecht, trans. Hans Keller; 1968)
- Sacred and Profane, Op. 91, for SSATB (1974–5)

=== Chamber/instrumental ===
==== Solo piano ====
- Five Waltzes, for piano (1923–25, rev. 1969)
- Three Character Pieces, for piano (1930)
- Twelve variations on a theme, for piano (1930)
- Holiday Diary, Op. 5, for piano (1934)
- Sonatina romantica for piano (rejected by the composer; 1940)
- Night-Piece (Notturno) for piano (written for Leeds International Pianoforte Competition; 1963)
- Variations for piano (1965, unfinished)

==== Two pianos ====
- Two Lullabies for two pianos (1936)
- Introduction and Rondo alla burlesca, Op. 23/1, for two pianos (1940)
- Mazurka elegiaca, Op. 23/2, for two pianos (written as part of the collaborative album Homage to Paderewski; 1941)

==== Organ ====
- Prelude and Fugue on a Theme of Vittoria for organ (1946)

==== String quartet ====
- String Quartet in F major (1928)
- Rhapsody (1929)
- Quartettino (1930)
- String Quartet in D major (1931, revised 1974)
- Alla Marcia (1933)
- Three Divertimenti, for string quartet (1933, revised 1936): March, Waltz, Burlesque
- String Quartet No. 1, Op. 25, in D major (1941)
- String Quartet No. 2, Op. 36, in C major (1945)
- String Quartet No. 3, Op. 94, in G major (1975)

==== Violin and piano ====
- Suite for Violin and Piano, Op. 6 (1935)
- Reveille, Concert Study (1937, published 1983)

==== Viola and piano ====
- Reflection for viola and piano (1930)
- Lachrymae, Op. 48, for viola and piano, after "If my complaints could passions move" by John Dowland; for William Primrose; 1950)
  - arranged for viola and string orchestra, Op. 48a (for Cecil Aronowitz; 1976)
- There is a willow grows aslant a brook (1932), an arrangement of the orchestral poem by Frank Bridge. The title is taken from Shakespeare, and the arrangement by Britten is dedicated to Bridge.

==== Violin, viola and piano ====
- Two Pieces (1929; first performance 2003)

==== Solo viola ====
- Etude (1929)
- Elegy (1930)

==== Cello and piano ====
- Cello Sonata, Op. 65, in C major (1961)

==== Solo cello ====
- Cello Suite No. 1, Op. 72 (1964)
- Cello Suite No. 2, Op. 80 (1967)
- Cello Suite No. 3, Op. 87 (1972)
- Tema "Sacher" for cello solo (1976)

==== Oboe and piano ====
- Two Insect Pieces for oboe and piano (1935)
- Temporal Variations for oboe and piano (1936)

==== Oboe and strings ====
- Phantasy Quartet, Op. 2, for oboe, violin, viola, and cello (1932)

==== Solo oboe ====
- Six Metamorphoses after Ovid, Op. 49, for solo oboe (1951), with quotations from Ovid's poem Metamorphoses

==== Flute, violin and piano 4-hands ====
- Gemini Variations, Op. 73, for flute, violin, and piano four hands (1965)

==== Solo timpani ====
- Timpani Piece for Jimmy, timpani solo (1955) for James Blades

==== Three trumpets ====
- Fanfare for St Edmundsbury, short antiphonal and polytonal piece for three trumpets (1959)

==== Guitar ====
- Nocturnal after John Dowland, Op. 70, for guitar (1963)

==== Harp ====
- Suite for Solo Harp, Op. 83 (1969)

=== Film & drama music ===
- Night Mail (1936), with words by W. H. Auden
- The Agamemnon of Aeschylus (1936), play by Louis MacNeice
- Love from a Stranger (1937), film directed by Rowland V. Lee
- Out of the Picture (1937), play by Louis MacNeice
- The Sword In The Stone (1939), six-part radio drama (Note: An adaptation of the T. H. White novel The Sword In The Stone. A single surviving 25-minute episode Wart and the Hawks, is available to stream.)
- The Dark Tower (1946), radio play by Louis MacNeice

== By opus number ==
- Op. 1, Sinfonietta, for five winds and five strings 1932, revised for chamber orchestra 1936
- Op. 2, Phantasy Quartet, oboe quartet, 1932
- Op. 3, A Boy was Born for mixed chorus with organ ad lib, 1933, revised 1955
- Op. 4, Simple Symphony for strings, 1934 (+ also version for string quartet)
- Op. 5, Holiday Diary for piano, 1934
- Op. 6, Suite for violin and piano, 1935
- Op. 7, Friday Afternoons for children's voices and piano, 1935
- Op. 8, Our Hunting Fathers for soprano or tenor and orchestra (words by W. H. Auden), 1936
- Op. 9, Soirées musicales for orchestra (after Rossini), 1936
- Op. 10, Variations on a Theme of Frank Bridge for string orchestra, 1937
- Op. 11, On this Island for soprano or tenor and piano (words by W. H. Auden), 1937
- Op. 12, Mont Juic, suite of Catalan dances, with Lennox Berkeley, 1937
- Op. 13, Piano Concerto, 1938, revised 1945
- Op. 14, Ballad of Heroes for tenor or soprano, chorus and orchestra (words by W. H. Auden and Randall Swingler), 1939
- Op. 15, Violin Concerto, 1939, revised 1958
- Op. 16, Young Apollo for piano and strings, 1939 (withdrawn, published 1982)
- Op. 17, Paul Bunyan, opera (libretto by W. H. Auden), 1941, revised 1976
- Op. 18, Les Illuminations, for soprano or tenor and strings (words by Arthur Rimbaud), 1939
- Op. 19, Canadian Carnival overture, 1939
- Op. 20, Sinfonia da Requiem, 1940
- Op. 21, Diversions for Piano Left Hand and Orchestra, 1940, revised 1954
- Op. 22, Seven Sonnets of Michelangelo for tenor and piano, 1940
- Op. 23 2 Pieces for 2 Pianos, 1940-1941
  - No. 1, Introduction and Rondo alla burlesca for two pianos, 1940
  - No. 2, Mazurka elegiaca for two pianos, 1941
- Op. 24, Matinées musicales for orchestra (after Rossini), 1941
- Op. 25, String Quartet No. 1, 1941
- Op. 26, Scottish Ballad for two pianos and orchestra, 1941
- Op. 27, Occasional Overture, 1941; retitled An American Overture when first performed, 1983
- Op. 27, Hymn to St Cecilia for SSATB, 1942 (replaced Occasional Overture as Op. 27)
- Op. 28, A Ceremony of Carols for trebles and harp, 1942
- Op. 29, Prelude and Fugue for 18 strings, 1943
- Op. 30, Rejoice in the Lamb for soloists, chorus and organ, 1943
- Op. 31, Serenade for Tenor, Horn and Strings, song cycle, 1943
- Op. 32, Festival Te Deum for chorus and organ, 1945
- Op. 33, Peter Grimes, opera (libretto by Montagu Slater, after George Crabbe), 1945
  - Op. 33a, Four Sea Interludes from Peter Grimes
  - Op. 33b, Passacaglia from Peter Grimes
- Op. 34, Variations and Fugue on a Theme of Henry Purcell (The Young Person's Guide to the Orchestra), 1946
- Op. 35, The Holy Sonnets of John Donne for soprano or tenor and piano, 1945
- Op. 36, String Quartet No. 2, 1945
- Op. 37, The Rape of Lucretia, opera (libretto by Ronald Duncan, after André Obey), 1946, revised 1947
- Op. 38, Occasional Overture, 1946 (withdrawn, published 1984)
- Op. 39, Albert Herring, opera (libretto by Eric Crozier, after Guy de Maupassant), 1947
- Op. 40, Canticle I: My beloved is mine and I am his for soprano or tenor and piano (words by Francis Quarles), 1947
- Op. 41, A Charm of Lullabies for mezzo soprano and piano, 1947
- Op. 42, Saint Nicolas for soloists, chorus, strings, piano (4 hands), percussion and organ, 1948
- Op. 43, The Beggar's Opera after John Gay, 1948
- Op. 44, Spring Symphony for soloists, mixed choir, children's choir and orchestra, 1949
- Op. 45, The Little Sweep, opera (libretto by Eric Crozier), 1949
- Op. 46, A Wedding anthem Amo Ergo Sum for soprano, tenor, SATB and organ (words by Ronald Duncan), 1949
- Op. 47, Five Flower Songs for SATB, 1950
- Op. 48, Lachrymae for viola and piano, 1950
  - Op. 48a, Lachrymae for viola and strings, 1976
- Op. 49, Six Metamorphoses after Ovid for oboe, 1951
- Op. 50, Billy Budd, opera (libretto by E. M. Forster and Eric Crozier, after Herman Melville), 1951, revised 1960
- Op. 51, Canticle II: Abraham and Isaac for alto, tenor and piano (Chester miracle play), 1952
- Op. 52, Winter Words for soprano or tenor and piano (words by Thomas Hardy), 1953
- Op. 53, Gloriana, opera (libretto by William Plomer, after Lytton Strachey), 1953
  - Op. 53a, Symphonic Suite "Gloriana" for tenor or oboe and orchestra, 1954
- Op. 54, The Turn of the Screw, opera (libretto by Myfanwy Piper, after Henry James), 1954
- Op. 55, Canticle III: Still falls the rain for tenor, horn and piano (words Edith Sitwell), 1954
- Op. 56a, Hymn to St Peter for treble, SATB and organ, 1955
- Op. 56b, Antiphon for SATB and organ, 1955
- Op. 57, The Prince of the Pagodas, ballet, 1956
  - Op. 57a, Pas de six from The Prince of the Pagodas
- Op. 58, Songs from the Chinese for soprano or tenor and guitar, 1957
- Op. 59, Noye's Fludde, opera (Chester mystery play), 1957
- Op. 60, Nocturne for tenor, 7 obbligato instruments and string orchestra, song cycle, 1958
- Op. 61, Sechs Hölderlin-Fragmente for voice and piano, 1958
- Op. 62, Cantata academica, 1959
- Op. 63, Missa brevis for boys' voices and organ, 1959
- Op. 64, A Midsummer Night's Dream, opera (libretto by Benjamin Britten and Peter Pears, after William Shakespeare), 1960
- Op. 65, Sonata for cello and piano, 1961
- Op. 66, War Requiem, 1961
- Op. 67, Psalm CL for children's chorus and instruments, 1962
- Op. 68, Cello Symphony, 1963
- Op. 69, Cantata misericordium, 1963
- Op. 70, Nocturnal after John Dowland for guitar, 1963
- Op. 71, Curlew River, church parable (libretto by William Plomer, after Noh), 1964
- Op. 72, Cello Suite No. 1, 1964
- Op. 73, Gemini Variations for flute, violin and piano four hands, 1965
- Op. 74, Songs and Proverbs of William Blake for baritone and piano, 1965
- Op. 75, Voices for Today for boys' voices, chorus and organ ad lib, 1965
- Op. 76, The Poet's Echo for soprano or tenor and piano (words by Alexander Pushkin), 1965
- Op. 77, The Burning Fiery Furnace, church parable (libretto by William Plomer, after the Book of Daniel), 1966
- Op. 78, The Golden Vanity for boys' voices and piano (words by Colin Graham), 1966
- Op. 79, The Building of the House overture, for chorus or organ or brass and orchestra, 1967
- Op. 80, Cello Suite No. 2, 1967
- Op. 81, The Prodigal Son, church parable (libretto by William Plomer, after the Gospel of Luke), 1968
- Op. 82, Children's Crusade (words Bertolt Brecht/Hans Keller), 1968
- Op. 83, Suite for Harp, 1969
- Op. 84, Who Are These Children? for tenor and piano (words by William Soutar), 1969
- Op. 85, Owen Wingrave, opera (libretto by Myfanwy Piper, based on Henry James), 1970
- Op. 86, Canticle IV: The Journey of the Magi for countertenor, tenor, baritone and piano (words by T. S. Eliot), 1971
- Op. 87, Cello Suite No. 3, 1971
- Op. 88, Death in Venice, opera (libretto by Myfanwy Piper, based on Thomas Mann), 1973
- Op. 89, Canticle V: The Death of Saint Narcissus for tenor and harp (words by T. S. Eliot), 1974
- Op. 90, A Suite on English Folk Tunes "A Time There Was" for chamber orchestra, 1974
- Op. 91, Sacred and Profane for five voices (SSATB), 1975
- Op. 92, A Birthday Hansel for high voice and harp (words by Robert Burns), 1975
- Op. 93, Phaedra, cantata (words by Robert Lowell, after Jean Racine), 1975
- Op. 94, String Quartet No. 3, 1975
- Op. 95, Welcome Ode for young people's voices and orchestra, 1976

== Sources ==
- Diane McVeagh, ed. (1986). English Masters. New Grove Composer Biography. Grove Publications. ISBN 0-333-40241-3.
- Oliver, Michael (1996). Benjamin Britten. Phaidon 20th Century Composers. Phaidon. ISBN 0714832774.
- Britten Thematic Catalogue
