= Canticle V: The Death of Saint Narcissus =

1974 composition by Benjamin Britten

- Vocal composition by Benjamin Britten
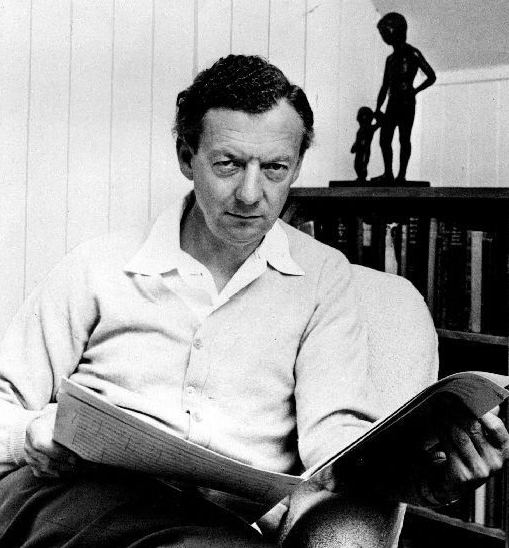
- Britten in 1968
- Opus: 89
- Related: Canticles
- Text: poem by T. S. Eliot
- Language: English
- Dedication: memory of William Plomer
- Performed: 15 January 1975
- Published: 1976
- Scoring: tenor; harp

Canticle V: The Death of Saint Narcissus, Op. 89, is a 1974 composition for tenor and harp by Benjamin Britten, the last part of his series of five Canticles. Britten set a poem by T. S. Eliot, beginning "Come under the shadow of this gray rock", published in Early Youth. He wrote it in memory of his friend William Plomer. The work was premiered by Peter Pears and Osian Ellis at Schloss Elmau in Upper Bavaria on 15 January 1975. It was published the following year. The canticle was often recorded, including by the first performers.

== Background and history ==
Britten composed his five Canticles between 1947 and 1974. Each one was composed after he completed an opera. They are also all vocal works that include tenor parts written for Peter Pears and set non-biblical religious texts; Britten was the pianist in the premieres of the first four Canticles. The first such work was possibly titled Canticle because it set a paraphrase of verses from the Song of Songs, sometimes referred to as the Canticles. In the works, Britten followed the model of Purcell's Divine Hymns, and wrote works that can be seen as miniature cantatas, and as song cycles.

As with the Canticle IV, Britten returned to T. S. Eliot for his Canticle V composed in 1974. He set an early poem that begins with the verse "Come under the shadow of this gray rock", first published in Early Youth by Faber & Faber in 1967. The composer read it while he recovered from heart surgery. His reading included works by Eliot, "for the clarity and security of his language", as he phrased it. Britten began experiencing heart problems in 1968, which required him to temporarily cease composition, an outcome that he said was "awfully frustrating". During the composition of the opera Death in Venice his ailments worsened to the extent that he decided to have cardiac valve surgery in the hope of alleviating his symptoms. Instead, he had a stroke in mid-operation which had significant consequences for him, including the debilitation of his right hand. As a result, his career as a performing musician ended and his subsequent vocal works no longer included piano accompaniment. This included the Canticle V, which Britten had originally intended to be accompanied by piano.

He dedicated the setting to the memory of his friend William Plomer, the librettist of the three church parables and Gloriana, who had died in 1973. Britten was not able to play the piano after the surgery and therefore wrote the music for tenor and harp, to be performed by Pears and Osian Ellis. Canticle V was premiered by Pears and Ellis on 15 January 1975 at Schloss Elmau in Germany. It was published in 1976 by Faber Music.

== Text and music ==
Although there are two saints known as Saint Narcissus in the Catholic Church, the character in Eliot's poem resembles the Narcissus of Greek mythology and Saint Sebastian. According to David Matthews, the Canticle V is part of a series of late Britten works that form a group unto themselves. "Like the late works of Mahler, they were written in the face of death", he said. Matthews listed the Canticle V as among the "most serious" of these works and "deeply concerned with [death]". The British musicologist Peter Evans said that despite the work's "reflections on death", it is "wonderfully free from the hysteria of over-emphasis".

Evans also noted the distinction between Britten's writing for piano in the previous canticles and for harp in the Canticle V, which he called "tenuous" in the latter. He also praised Britten for composing an accompaniment that sounded "revitalized by new instrumental capacities" and included "most bewitching harp sonorities". The composition, as others from Britten's last period, is "spare and economical", with elegantly expressive vocal lines. While the voice carries the text's meaning, the harp adds "abrupt and vivid dramatic gestures" following the emotional expression, adding "colour and atmosphere". Linda and Michael Hutcheon said that the work's scoring "illustrates not only the composer's new physical limitations, but also the workings of his innovative imagination". The work's form can be described as "exposition, development, episode and intensified recapitulation", with a climax towards the end. The work's duration is approximately 7 minutes. Evans summed up the work:

The last canticle is as moving as any of the set and many words could be expended on our emotional reactions to it. As ever, it succeeds not only because Britten was able to share the poet's vision, but because he encompassed it in a musical organism of perfect aptitude.

== Recordings ==
Pears and Ellis, the performers of the premiere, recorded the canticle in February 1976 at The Maltings, Snape. A reviewer noted that Britten may have taken in account that the aging voice of Pears was effective "in the context of complex homo-erotic repression", and found the musicians "providing both authenticity and deep insight into a consistently great composer". All five canticles were recorded by Naxos Records in 1996, including Canticle V with tenor Philip Langridge and Ellis as the harpist. A reviewer noted that the presence of Ellis, who had worked closely with Britten and had played the premiere, singled the recording out. The canticle was recorded in 2012 by tenor Nicholas Phan and harpist Sivan Magen in a collection of vocal music by Britten. A reviewer for MusicWeb International stated his dislike for "Eliot's insufferable poem" and the degree to which he felt the score exemplified "the aridity that haunts much of the music composed towards the end of Britten's life". However, he added that he could not deny the work's "innovative and dramatic harp writing, and that the music seems perfectly at one with the words".
