= A Birthday Hansel =

Song cycle by Benjamin Britten, set to texts by Robert Burns

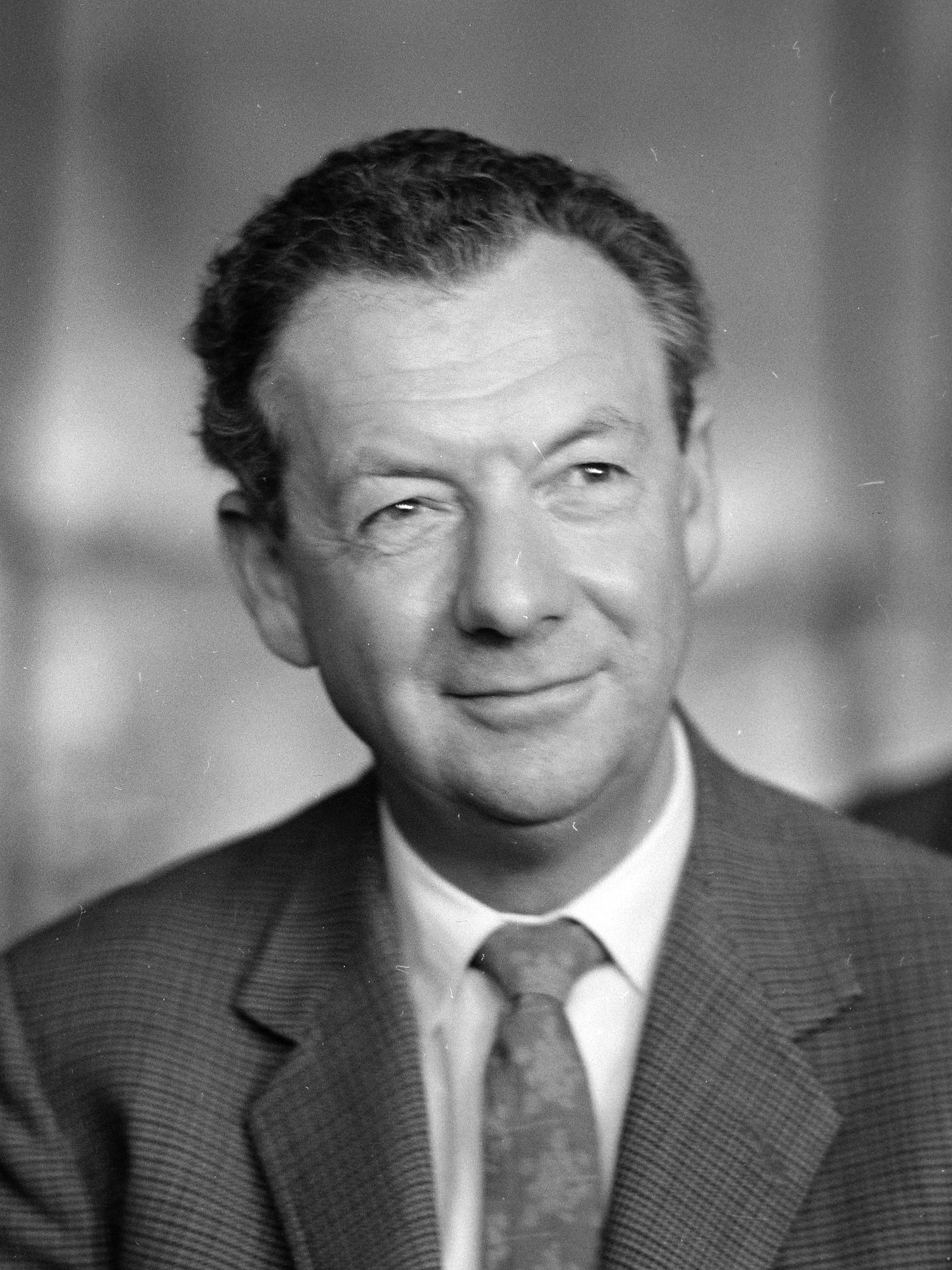
Benjamin Britten in 1965

A Birthday Hansel, Op. 92, is a song cycle for 'high voice' and harp composed by Benjamin Britten and set to texts by Robert Burns. The last song cycle that Britten wrote, it was composed in honour of the Queen Mother's 75th birthday, at the request of her daughter, Elizabeth II. (The Queen Mother was patron of the Aldeburgh Festival.)

Composed in March 1975, the piece was given its debut performance in January 1976 by Britten's life partner Peter Pears and harpist Osian Ellis. It was the last piece which Britten wrote for Pears, and one of his very last works.

In recognition of the Queen Mother's Scottish ancestry, Britten chose seven poems by Burns, sung in the Scots language, and performed without a break. 'Hansel' is a Scots word meaning welcome gift or present. At Britten's request, Colin Matthews arranged four of the songs for voice and piano; these were published separately as Four Burns Songs in 1978.

== Songs ==
The songs are:

1. "Birthday Song"
2. "My Early Walk"
3. "Wee Willie Gray"
4. "My Hoggie"
5. "Afton Water"
6. "The Winter"
7. "Leezie Lindsay"

A complete performance takes about 18 minutes.

Musicologist Peter Evans has analysed the cycle. It is through-composed, with the harp supplying transitions from the mood of one poem to the next. As befits a birthday gift, it does not attempt to point out morals nor to invite deep reflection. The songs do not explicitly utilise Scottish musical forms, but are flavoured by echoes of them. Although the texts are all by a single poet, the cycle does not have a sense of the cumulative illumination of the poet's creative character as is found in other such cycles by Britten. It is "delightful but undemanding".
