= String Quartet No. 3 (Britten) =

Composition by Benjamin Britten

String Quartet
- No. 3
- by Benjamin Britten
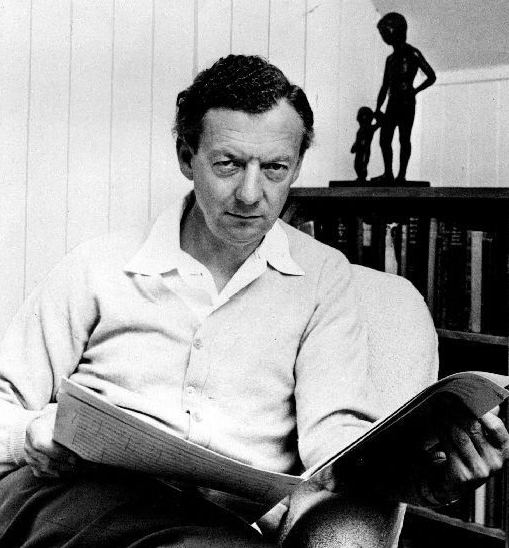
- Britten in the mid-1960s
- Key: G major
- Opus: 94
- Composed: 1975
- Dedication: Hans Keller

Premiere
- Date: 19 December 1976
- Location: The Maltings, Snape
- Performers: Amadeus Quartet

String Quartet No. 3 in G major, Op. 94, by English composer Benjamin Britten was his last completed major work, and his last completed instrumental work. It was written in October – November 1975 during his final illness: the first four movements at his home, The Red House, Aldeburgh, and the fifth during his last visit to Venice, at Hotel Danieli. It was dedicated to the musicologist Hans Keller. In December 1975, brothers Colin and David Matthews performed it privately for the composer in a piano duet arrangement. During September 1976, Britten worked on it with the Amadeus Quartet; who premiered it on 19 December 1976 at The Maltings, Snape, two weeks after the composer's death.

== Musical structure ==
The quartet is in five movements:

1. Duets. With moderate movement
2. Ostinato. Very fast
3. Solo. Very calm
4. Burlesque. Fast – con fuoco
5. Recitative and Passacaglia (La Serenissima). Slow

All five movements are in ternary (A-B-A) form. The quartet is in arch form, with a slow lyrical central movement enclosed by two scherzos themselves enclosed by two slow outer movements. English musicologist Peter Evans has remarked that that structure invites comparison with Bartók's fourth and fifth string quartets; only to dismiss that comparison almost as soon as made.

In "Duets", Britten explores all six possible relationships between the four instruments in a quartet.

The "Recitative" which begins the last movement includes five musical quotations from Britten's 1973 opera Death in Venice (his last). The concluding "Passacaglia" (one of Britten's favorite musical forms) is based on a musical motif from that opera. Its title, La Serenissima (English: the most serene), derives from the historic status of the former Republic of Venice as a sovereign republic, and is sometimes still applied to the modern city of Venice.

A typical performance takes about 25 minutes – although according to musicologist Roger Parker, Britten's markings are so precise that the timing of each movement is specified almost to the second.

== Critical reception ==
Musicologist Peter Evans:

The profound impression it made then [at the premiere performance by the Amadeus Quartet] might appear an inevitable consequence of the occasion, but greater familiarity with the work confirms that the simplicity of its language and the serenity to which it aspires represent a distillation, not a dilution, of Britten's expressivity during the most poignant period of his life.

Teacher and composer Robert Saxton:

I actually think some of Britten's late compositions are masterpieces. I heard the String Quartet No. 3 played at Tanglewood when I was teaching there in 1986, and it was a moving experience to witness a tough American modern music audience, nine hundred or a thousand of them, stunned into silence at the end, before they felt able to applaud. I think when you've got somebody delivering the goods like that ten years after his death, to a hardened new music American audience, you've got to be very careful criticising him.

Composer David Matthews:

The two earlier quartets had been among his finest instrumental works; the Third is their equal in invention, and in range and depth of expression their superior.

Musicologist Roger Parker:

This is, after all, a work that gestures again and again towards some of life’s great mysteries, its most humbling challenges; the steps one takes towards understanding it should, perhaps above all, be wandering and slow, ever aware of the subjunctive and the finite.

Musicologist Ben Hogwood:

The third quartet, then, is where Britten officially takes his leave. A handful of works would follow, but this is the moment where he gives up his soul, in music of affecting beauty. The last movement ensures he leaves with his head held high, innovating and captivating to the very end.

== Recordings ==
- 1978 – Amadeus Quartet, Decca LP SXL 6893; remastered 1990 London Records CD 425 715-2
- 1981 – Alberni Quartet, CRD Records LP CRD 1095; rereleased 1989, CRD Records CD CRD 3395
- 1986 – Endellion Quartet
- 1990 – Britten Quartet
- 1996 – The Lindsays, ASV Digital CD DCA 608
- 2002 – Brodsky Quartet, Challenge CD CC 72099
- 2002 - Verdi Quartett, Haenssler Classic CD 98.394
- 2005 – Belcea Quartet, EMI Classics CD 7243 5 57968 2 0
- 2013 – Takács Quartet, Hyperion CD CDA68004
- 2017 – Emerson String Quartet, Decca CD B0026509-02
