= Phantasy Quartet =

Phantasy
- Quartet in one movement for oboe, violin, viola, violoncello
- Oboe quartet by Benjamin Britten
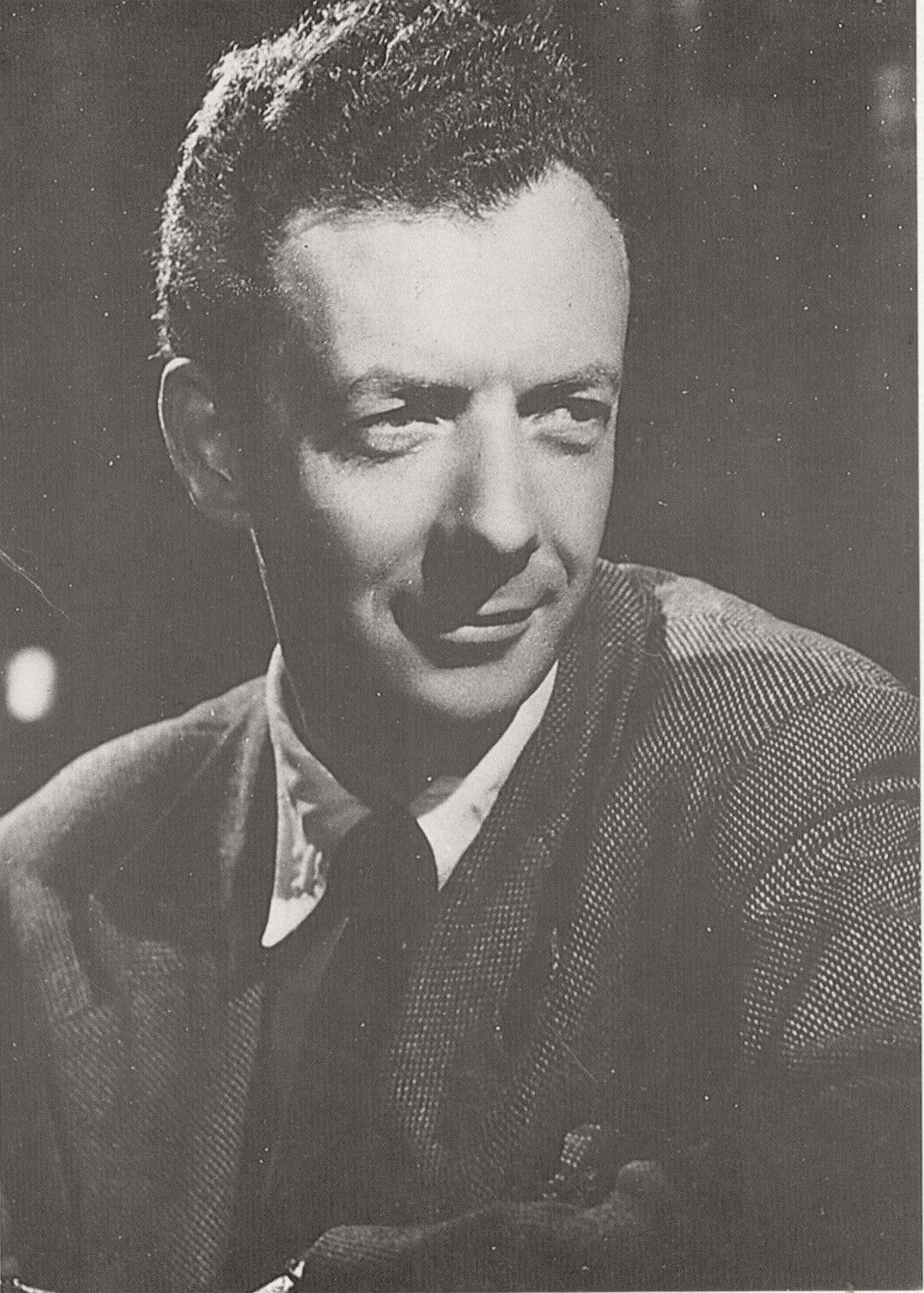
- Benjamin Britten in the 1940s
- Other name: Phantasy Quartet
- Opus: 2
- Composed: 1932
- Dedication: Léon Goossens
- Performed: August 1933

Phantasy Quartet, Op. 2, is the common name of a piece of chamber music by Benjamin Britten, a quartet for oboe and string trio composed in 1932. In the composer's catalogue, it is given as Phantasy, subtitled: Quartet in one movement for oboe, violin, viola, violoncello. It was first performed in August 1933 as a BBC broadcast.

== History ==
Britten composed Phantasy Quartet at age 18 as a student at the Royal College of Music, after his first work to which he assigned an Opus number, the Sinfonietta for chamber orchestra. He dedicated it to the oboist Léon Goossens, who played the first performance in a BBC broadcast on 6 August 1933, with members of the International String Quartet. The same players performed the concert premiere in London on 21 November that year. On 5 April 1934, it was performed in Florence for the International Society of Contemporary Music, as the first piece to win the composer international recognition.

== Music ==
The music is in the form of a 16th-century fantasy, in an arch form with elements from the sonata form. As in Mozart's Oboe Quartet, the oboe has a solo function. The duration is given as 15 minutes.

It has been called "consummately crafted". The music grows out of silence and in the end returns to it in symmetry. The first theme is a march, marked molto pianissimo, with the cello beginning muted and on the fingerboard, followed by viola, violin and finally the oboe. The theme becomes later also the source of themes in a fast section, similar to the development section of the sonata form. In the slow middle section, the strings alone introduce a theme in which the oboe joins. It is followed, in symmetry, by a recapitulation of the fast section, and then the march. The musicologist Eric Roseberry summarises: "If the pastoral slow section echoes the leisurely folkiness of an Englishry that Britten had not yet entirely rejected, the Phantasy as a whole generates a tension and harmonic grittiness which are harbingers of a less complacent outlook."

== Recordings ==
A recording by oboist François Leleux with Lisa Batiashvili, Lawrence Power and Sebastian Klinger combines the quartet with Mozart's oboe quartet and other chamber music by the two composers.
