= Canticle IV: The Journey of the Magi =

1971 composition by Benjamin Britten

- Vocal composition by Benjamin Britten
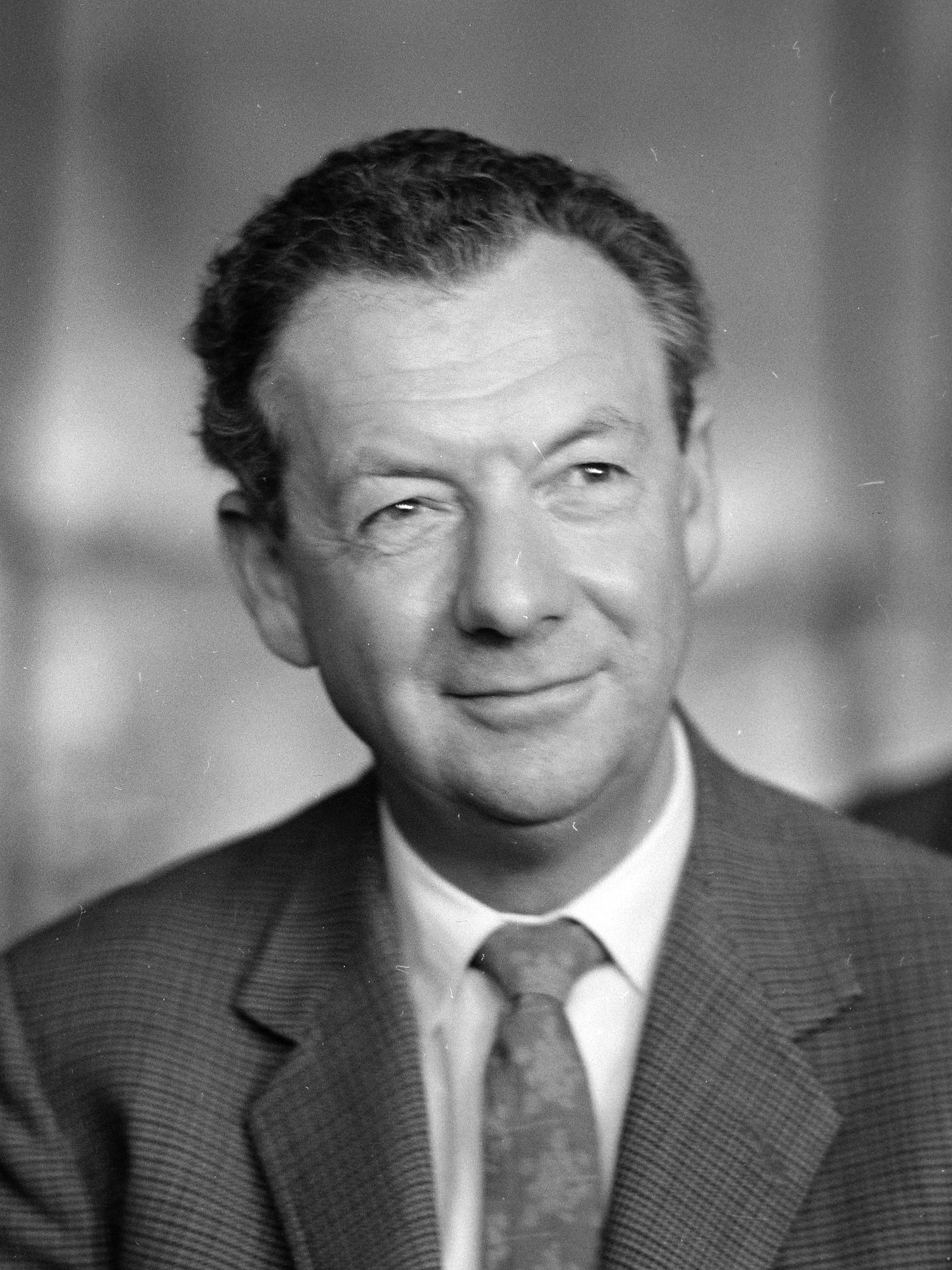
- Benjamin Britten in 1965
- Opus: 86
- Related: Canticles
- Text: "Journey of the Magi" by T. S. Eliot
- Language: English
- Dedication: James Bowman; Peter Pears; John Shirley-Quirk
- Performed: 30 June 1971
- Published: 1971
- Scoring: countertenor; tenor; baritone; piano

Canticle IV: The Journey of the Magi, Op. 86, is a composition for three male solo voices and piano by Benjamin Britten, part of his series of five Canticles. It sets the text of T. S. Eliot's poem "Journey of the Magi", retelling the story of the biblical Magi. The work was premiered in June 1971 at the Aldeburgh Festival by James Bowman, Peter Pears and John Shirley-Quirk, with Britten as the pianist. It was published the following year, dedicated to the three singers.

== Background and history ==
Britten composed his five Canticles over an extended period of almost 30 years, between 1947 and 1975. They have in common to be written for voices, all including a tenor with Peter Pears in mind, and all setting religious but not biblical texts. The first such work was possibly titled Canticle because it set a paraphrase of verses from the Song of Songs, sometimes referred to as the Canticles. In the works, Britten followed the model of Purcell's Divine Hymns, and wrote works that can be seen as miniature cantatas, and as song cycles.

After completing the third Canticle in 1954, Britten turned to the religious text "The Bitter Withy" in 1962, but abandoned the project. He turned to "Journey of the Magi" after a hiatus of 17 years after the third, writing Canticle IV: The Journey of the Magi in January 1971 for a countertenor, a tenor, a baritone and piano. All canticles followed opera compositions, the fourth written five months after Owen Wingrave. It was premiered on 6 June 1971 at Snape Maltings in Suffolk, England, as part of the Aldeburgh Festival, performed by countertenor James Bowman, Pears as the tenor, and baritone John Shirley-Quirk, with Britten as the pianist. It was published in 1972 by Faber Music. The three singers in the premiere, to whom Britten dedicated Canticle IV, would perform major roles in the world premiere of his last opera, Death in Venice, in 1973.

== Text and music ==
Canticle IV sets the text of the poem "Journey of the Magi" by T. S. Eliot, published in 1927. The poem is narrated by one of the biblical Magi, describing their voyage in retrospect, and tells of the Magi's doubts and frustrations in searching for the new-born Christ Child, and of their subsequent doubts about the significance of the voyage and what they had really seen.

The composition is structured as a rondo, with the solo voices at times blended into one. Sometimes the voices sing in different times and metres, a feature that Britten had also used in his church parables. At the work's climax, the piano quotes plainchant tune "Magi videntes stellarum" (The wise men beholding the star), used as a Magnificat antiphon for First Vespers on the Feast of the Epiphany. The work's duration is given as 11 minutes.

== Recordings ==
The canticles, including Canticle IV, were recorded by Naxos Records in 2005, with tenor Philip Langridge, countertenor Derek Lee Ragin, baritone Gerald Finley, and pianist Steuart Bedford.
