= String Quartet No. 1 (Britten) =

String Quartet
- No. 1
- by Benjamin Britten
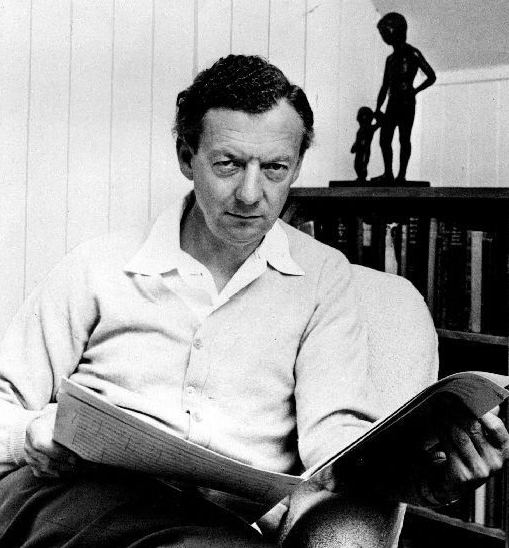
- Britten in the mid-1960s
- Key: D major
- Opus: 25
- Composed: 1941

Premiere
- Date: 21 September 1941
- Location: Occidental College, Los Angeles
- Performers: Coolidge Quartet

String Quartet No. 1 in D major, Op. 25, by English composer Benjamin Britten, was written in the U.S. in 1941.

== History ==
The quartet was commissioned by arts patron Elizabeth Sprague Coolidge, while Britten was living in America. At the time, he and Peter Pears were staying as guests of the English piano duo Ethel Bartlett and Rae Robertson in Escondido near San Diego, California. It was the last important work of his American period. Britten remarked that three months to write it was "Short notice & a bit of a sweat, but I'll do it as the cash will be useful!" The fee was $400 (roughly equivalent to $6700 in 2017).

The premiere performance was on 21 September 1941 at Occidental College, in Los Angeles, with the composer present, by the Coolidge Quartet. Britten wrote afterwards to Mrs Coolidge that he "was delighted with the way that they had played my quartet – really first class, both in musicianship and technique". He had already intended to write a piece for the Griller Quartet, and they gave the UK premiere in 1943. The premiere recording was by the Galimir Quartet in 1951.

In 1979, musicologist Peter Evans wrote that the quartet both had and had not secured a place in the repertory. (Note: It is unclear which of these two incompatible statements reflects Evans' opinion.) It has been recorded by several distinguished quartets (see Recordings, below).

== Analysis and reception ==
The quartet is in four movements:

1. Andante sostenuto – Allegro vivo
2. Allegro con slancio (Note: The unusual musical designation con slancio uses the Italian word slancio, a dash, leap or surge. Isabel Morse Jones, a music critic who attended the premiere, interpreted con slancio as meaning the rhythm of a garden swing.)
3. Andante calmo (in 5/4 time)
4. Molto vivace

A typical performance takes about 26 minutes. The first and third movements, at about 10 minutes each, are much longer than the second and fourth, at about 3 minutes each. The sonata-form first movement contains alternating andante and allegro passages, the slow and fast music playing for similar durations.

On 22 September 1941, Isabel Morse Jones, music critic for the Los Angeles Times, reviewed the premiere. She wrote, "It is distinctly contemporary and the work starts in a wholly unique ethereality. Upper partials barely heard usher in the first subject most gently. Then a rhythm-cleverness changes the whole picture. Britten wanted to bring the music to consciousness mysteriously, as from another world. The idea was all right but the music was not effective". Nevertheless, she suggested that the slow third movement might be titled "In Memoriam for a Lost World", and said that the last movement was "a brilliant success".

According to Britten's biographer Humphrey Carpenter, the tense and restless character of the quartet may reflect an emotional turmoil in the composer; or, perhaps, partly derive from his working conditions – he had had to shut himself in a tool shed and turn on a fan to drown out the sound of his hosts' piano practice.

Musicologist Peter Evans analysed the structure of the quartet in detail. He saw resemblances to Beethoven, Bartók and Haydn in some of its features. He wrote, "the extremely subtle relationship between inherent characteristics of the material and its structural working-out showed Britten at twenty-seven to be a master of tonal architecture with scarcely a rival on the English scene". To Evans, Britten's use of D major is often, as here, associated with "a luminous harmony of gentle diatonic dissonance".

Musicologist Roger Parker called the quartet "a significant milestone in Britten’s composing career", and, brushing aside what he called the "music-analytical Britten industry", also compared it with late Beethoven.

Ben Hogwood summarised critical opinions on the quartet. "Critical reaction to the quartet was largely strong, and the work is held in good regard by authorities on the composer, despite acknowledgement of a few formal quirks and minor shortcomings." Like others, he saw resemblances to Beethoven.

== Recordings ==
- 1951 – Galimir Quartet, premiere recording Esoteric 78 rpm ES504; re-released (1966) on Saga XID 5259 and (unknown date) on Counterpoint/Esoteric Records CPTS-5504 US
- 1957 – Paganini Quartet, Liberty SWL 15000
- 1965 – Fidelio Quartet, Pye Golden Guinea Records GSGC I4025
- 1972 – Allegri Quartet, Decca LP SXL 6564
- 1978 – Alberni Quartet, CRD Records CRD 1051
- 1986 – Endellion Quartet, His Master's Voice E 2705021/31/41
- 1991 – Britten Quartet, Collins Classics 11152
- 1998 – Maggini Quartet, Naxos 8.553883
- 2005 – Belcea Quartet EMI Classics CD 7243 5 57968 2 0
- 2013 – Takács Quartet, Hyperion CD CDA68004
- 2018 -- Doric Quartet, Chandos 20124
