= An American Overture =

1941 overture by Benjamin Britten

- by Benjamin Britten
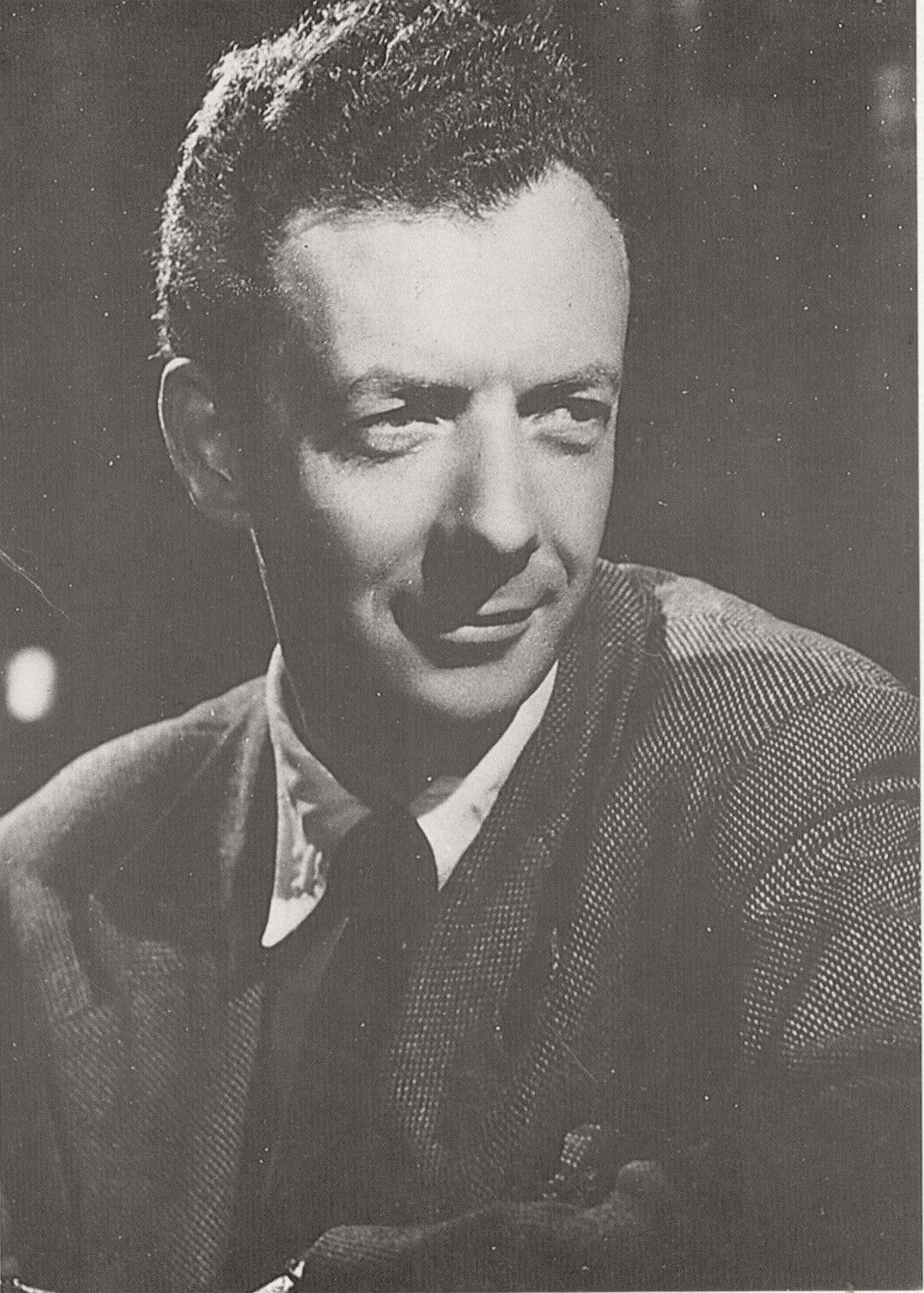
- Britten c. 1940s
- Other name: Occasional Overture
- Opus: 27
- Composed: August 18, 1941 – October 16, 1941: Escondido, California, and Amityville, New York, US
- Publisher: Faber Music
- Duration: c. 10 minutes

Premiere
- Date: November 8, 1983
- Location: Birmingham Town Hall; Birmingham, England, UK
- Performers: City of Birmingham Symphony Orchestra; Simon Rattle (conductor)

An American Overture (originally titled Occasional Overture), Op. 27 is an orchestral composition by Benjamin Britten. It was composed in 1941, while Britten and his life partner, the tenor Peter Pears, lived in the United States. Personal difficulties, global events, and the desire to earn more money goaded Britten to leave England and pursue a career in the United States.

Britten began to compose An American Overture while he and Pears were living at the home of the piano duo Bartlett and Robertson in Escondido, California. The work had resulted from a proposal initiated in August 1941, by the conductor Artur Rodziński for a short orchestral work he intended to conduct in concerts with the Cleveland Orchestra and the New York Philharmonic-Symphony Orchestra in October and November of that year respectively. Britten completed the work on October 16, during a guest stay at the home of Elizabeth Mayer in Amityville, New York. For reasons undetermined, Rodziński never conducted An American Overture, possibly because it was never delivered to him. Britten soon became critical of the work and entered a period of creative crisis, which was further worsened by the poor reception to his operetta Paul Bunyan, difficulties with the American Federation of Musicians, and his unreciprocated attraction to the young son of a hardware store owner in Amityville. Britten and Pears returned to England in 1942, but left behind the score to An American Overture.

After being acquired by a musical rental agency, the score was deposited in the New York Public Library in the mid-1950s. A staff archivist discovered it and contacted Britten about it in 1972, whereupon the composer replied that he did not recall the work. After indicating that he preferred to have the score destroyed, he allowed permission for it to be available for private viewing by library patrons, but demanded that it never be published. After Britten's death, it was published by Faber Music. Its world premiere took place on November 8, 1983, played by the City of Birmingham Symphony Orchestra conducted by Simon Rattle.

== Name ==
Britten originally named the work Occasional Overture. He reused the title in 1946, for an unrelated orchestral work commissioned to inaugurate the BBC Third Programme. In order to distinguish them from each other, the earlier of the two was retitled An American Overture upon publication. Its designation as "Op. 27" was reused by Benjamin Britten for his Hymn to St. Cecilia composed in 1942.

== Background ==
=== From England to Escondido ===
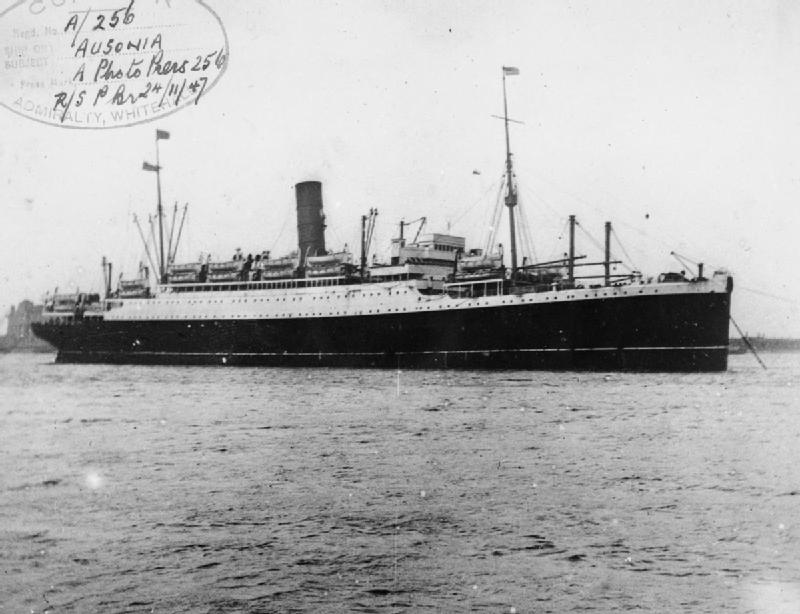
Britten and Pears voyaged to North America on the RMS Ausonia.

By the late 1930s, Britten had attained what his biographer Humphrey Carpenter later described as "a remarkable eminence" in English music. All of his major compositions, with the exception of Our Hunting Fathers, were widely performed and discussed. Steady demand for Britten's work from film, radio, and the theatre, as well as the support of Ralph Hawkes, the co-founder of the music publisher Boosey & Hawkes, ensured the composer a secure income. "In general", Carpenter said, "[Britten] enjoyed an esteem that must have been the envy of every other composer in the country".

Nonetheless, personal and external matters motivated Britten to leave England and pursue his career in the United States. He later explained to the American composer Aaron Copland that "a thousand reasons—mostly 'problems'" goaded his decision. The tenor Peter Pears, Britten's life partner, told Tony Palmer in 1980 that the composer had become impatient with the pace of his career development in England. An offer from Paramount Studios in early 1939 to score an ultimately unrealized film based on the Knights of the Round Table, with Lewis Milestone as director, alerted the composer to the possibility of becoming wealthy in the American film industry. American music, in particular the works of Copland, was a further enticement to emigration. Another factor was Britten's desire to escape the complications that resulted from his romantic relationships with Wulff Scherchen and Lennox Berkeley. Britten had also begun to live together with Pears. During this period their relationship was platonic; it soon developed into a lifelong romantic relationship. The increasing threat of war in Europe and their shared pacificism also contributed to their desire to leave England. At the time, Britten recalled in a 1960 interview, it seemed that the future of his career would be in the United States. "[I] felt Europe was more or less finished", he said.

On April 29, 1939, Britten and Pears embarked on the RMS Ausonia and sailed to North America. After brief stays in Canada, Michigan, and New York, they finally settled temporarily in mid-1941 at the home of the piano duo Bartlett and Robertson in Escondido, California.

=== Commission and composition ===
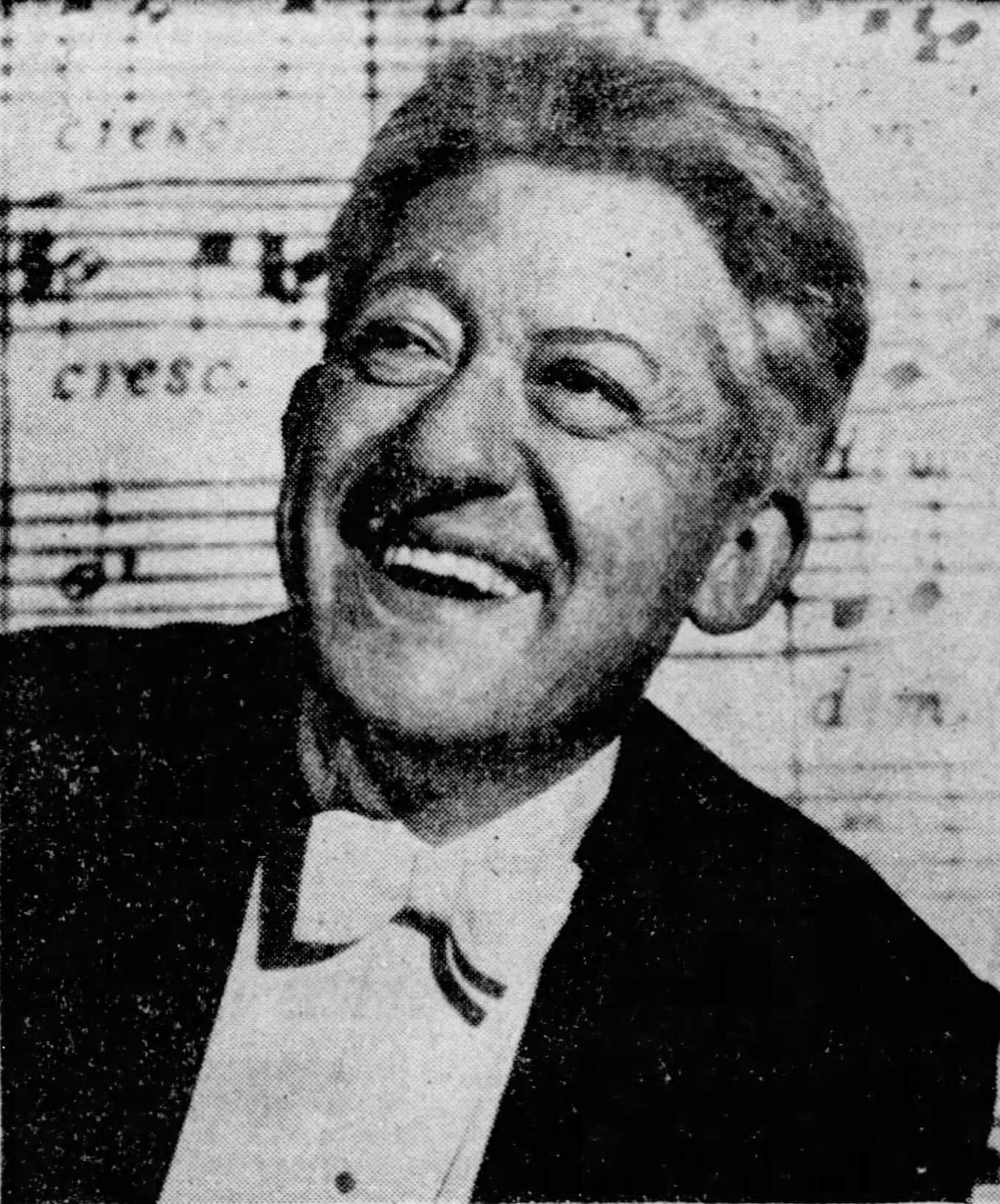
Artur Rodziński in 1948

In August 1941, Hawkes sent Britten a brief proposal to compose an overture for the Cleveland Orchestra and its music director Artur Rodziński. He provided more detail in a subsequent letter to the composer dated August 18. Rodziński, Hawkes explained to Britten, was very pleased to learn that the composer was planning a five or six minute overture. However, he wanted to have it ready by the second week of November, when he was scheduled to conduct concerts with the New York Philharmonic-Symphony Orchestra. A further letter dated September 16, urged Britten to stop work on the Scottish Ballad he was composing for Bartlett and Robertson in order to concentrate on the overture. Hans Heinsheimer, an agent for Boosey & Hawkes, informed the composer in a telegram dated September 18, that Rodziński now expected to have the work ready by early October, so he could first conduct it in Cleveland that month, then in New York City in November.

Britten completed An American Overture on October 16, while he and Pears were guests at the home of Elizabeth Mayer in Amityville, New York. In her diaries she recorded that she, Britten, and Pears stayed up until 2:30 a.m. in her music room; Pears read aloud from E. M. Forster's A Room with a View, while she prepared a fair copy of Britten's score. In a letter dated October 18 to the American arts patron Elizabeth Sprague Coolidge, Britten described the ten days preceding the work's completion as a "rush job-of-work". It was the last of his orchestral works composed in the United States.

=== Loss and rediscovery ===
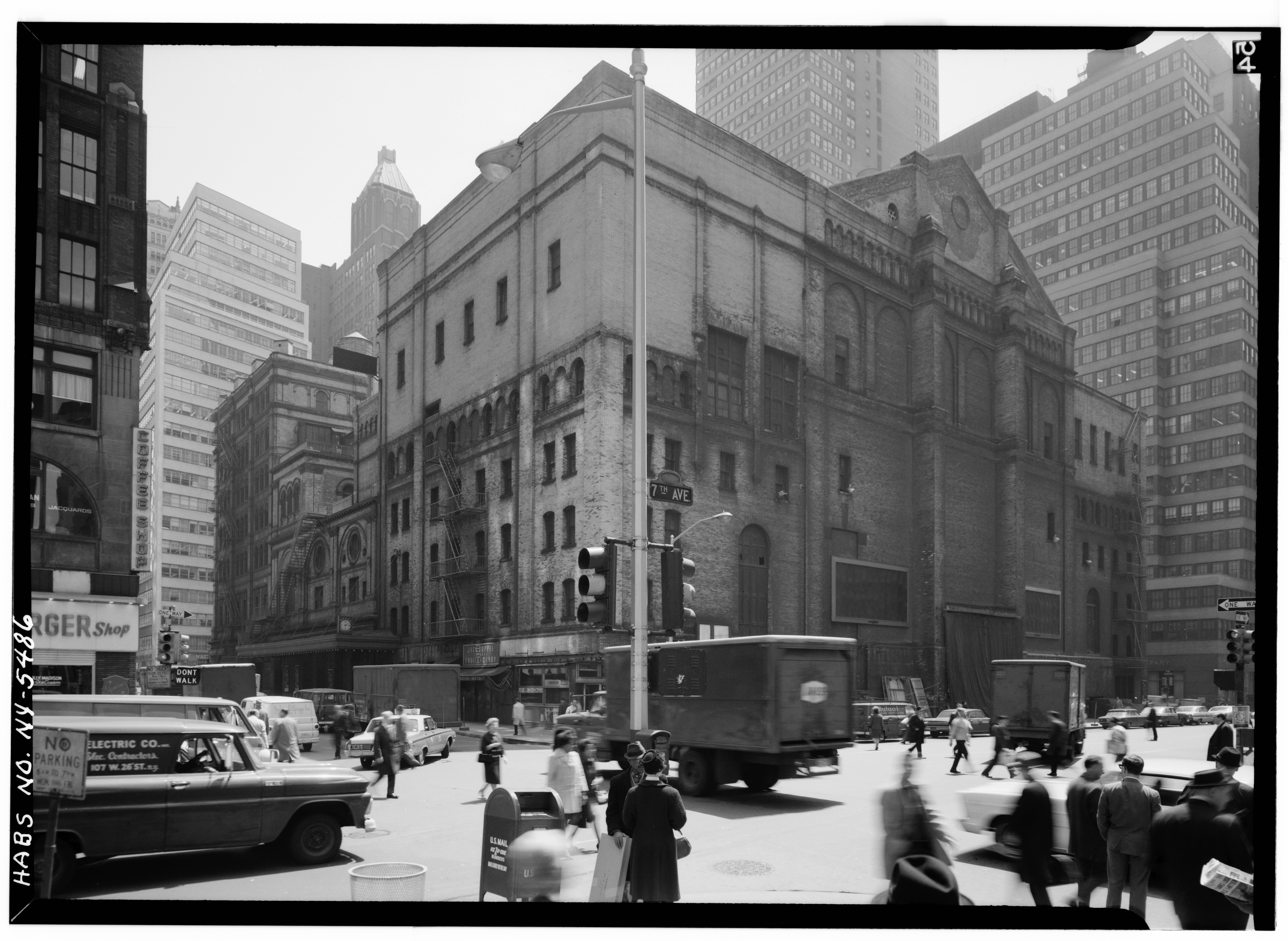
After Britten left the US, the score to An American Overture was stored at a music rental agency that operated in the Old Met (pictured in 1966).

For reasons that remain undetermined, Rodziński never conducted An American Overture. Britten wrote to a friend on November 4, "I don't think [Rodziński] is going to play [An American Overture] after all—disappointing after the hurry". That same day, Britten repeated his frustration to his sister Beth, then added his disappointment with the quality of the music:

I'm afraid ... I didn't do an awfully good job—it is so difficult to think clearly sometimes these days. However it'll pass muster for the moment & I hope to rewrite it sometime.

In late 1941, after the overture was completed, Britten experienced a creative crisis, the result of the poor reception of his operetta Paul Bunyan, difficulties with the American Federation of Musicians, and his unreciprocated attraction to the young son of a hardware store owner in Amityville.

By December 16, the score had been photocopied. However, there is no extant evidence that it was ever sent to Rodziński. The music critic Michael Kennedy speculated that the score may never have been delivered. The last time Rodziński mentioned the score was in a letter to Britten dated January 14, 1942. He confirmed that he received a copy of the Sinfonia da Requiem and expressed therein that he preferred to conduct it instead of An American Overture. On March 31, Britten and Pears departed from the United States on the Swedish cargo ship Axel Johnson, en route to England. The manuscript score to An American Overture was left behind.

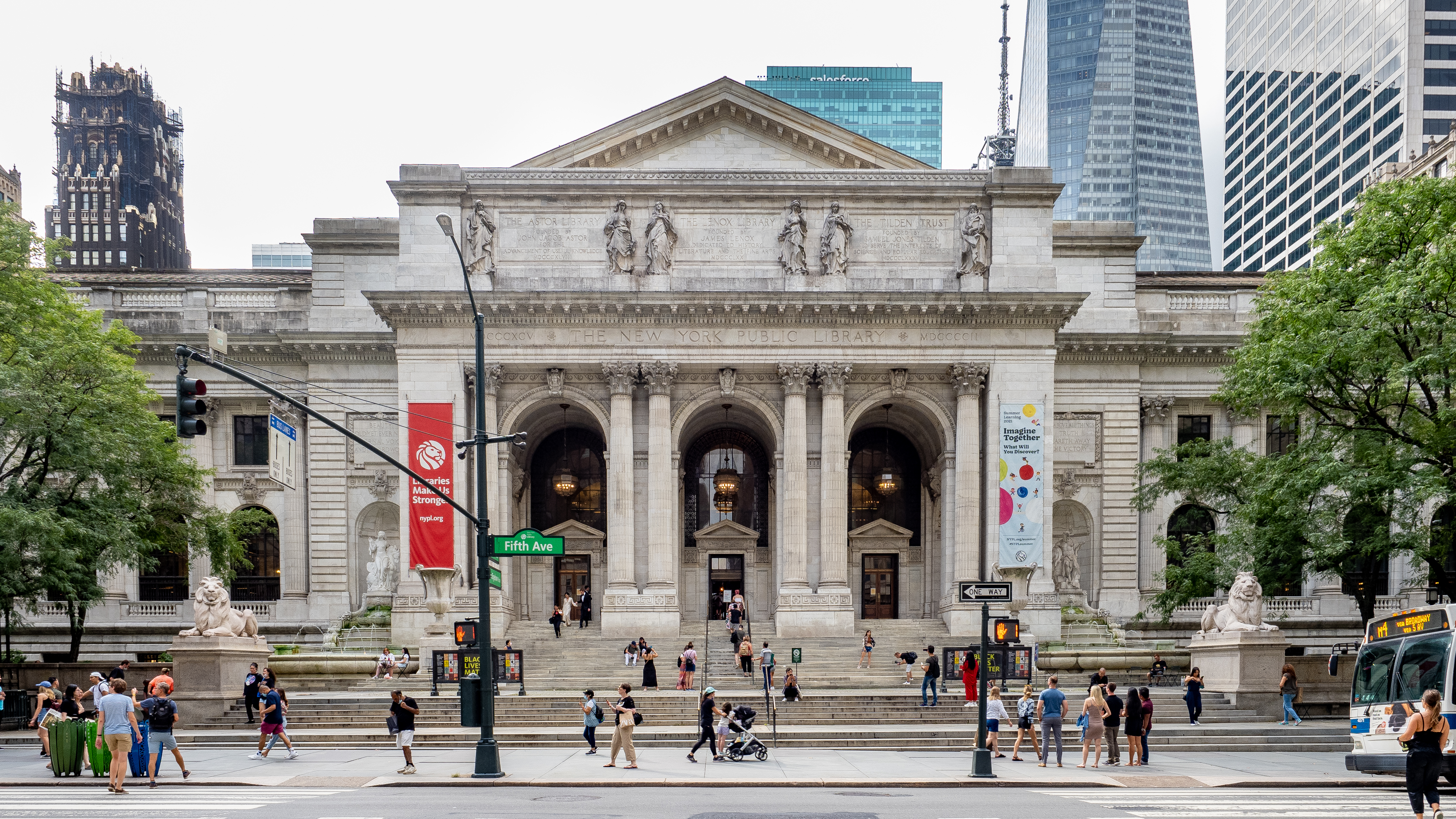
The score to An American Overture was eventually deposited at the New York Public Library Main Branch.

At an unknown later point, the score to An American Overture was acquired by a musical rental agency that operated from the Old Met in New York City. It was subsequently given to the New York Public Library Main Branch in the mid-1950s. Joe Bailey Cole, a staff archivist, discovered the score and contacted Britten about it in July 1972. On August 18, Britten replied:

About five years ago or so, a photograph of this work was brought to my notice. Although the writing was clearly mine and the music had obviously some of my mannerisms (not my happiest!), I had absolutely no recollection whatsoever of writing the work ... I was in quite a psychological state then and so I suppose it is not impossible that the writing of even such a large and fully-scored work could have escaped my memory!

Britten told Cole that he "should love to have the work destroyed", but felt that such a request was "a little bit too much to ask". Instead, he gave permission for the score to be viewed privately by library patrons, but demanded that it never be reproduced, whether in full or part. "I am sure you will understand", he concluded, "it is because of the unhappy conditions in which the work was (may be [sic]) written by me!"

== Music ==
=== Description ===
An American Overture consists of three distinct sections; its structure is modeled after an earlier orchestral work, Canadian Carnival, which Britten composed in 1939. The overture begins with a slow, perambulating march underpinned by pizzicato basses doubled by harps that leads to a chorale; it is similar to material that Britten later used in his opera Gloriana and ballet The Prince of the Pagodas. The musicologist Eric Roseberry described it as "Coplandesque in its fresh simplicity". It segues into a fast section that the Britten biographer Paul Kildea described as "full of prairie sounds" and "barn-dance extemporizing on solo fiddles". He also noted that this passage anticipated similar use of folk-influenced motifs in the opera Peter Grimes. Roseberry also detected the influence of jazz in this section. The work concludes with a reprise of the slow opening march and chorale played by the full orchestra.

=== Duration and instrumentation ===
An American Overture lasts approximately 10 minutes. Its instrumentation is as follows:

Woodwinds

3 flutes (3rd doubling piccolo)
3 oboe
3 clarinets (3rd doubling bass clarinet)
3 bassoons

Brass

4 French horns
3 trumpets
3 trombones
1 tuba

Percussion

timpani

bass drum (with mounted cymbal)
snare drum
tam-tam
suspended cymbal
tambourine
tubular bells
celesta

Strings

2 harps (2nd ad libitum)

1st violins
2nd violins
violas
cellos
double basses

== Premieres ==
Despite Britten's objections, An American Overture was posthumously published and performed. The world premiere of the work occurred on November 8, 1983, at Birmingham Town Hall in Birmingham, England. It was played by the City of Birmingham Symphony Orchestra conducted by Simon Rattle. He subsequently also conducted the American premiere in Los Angeles at Dorothy Chandler Pavilion on March 8, 1984; the orchestra was the Los Angeles Philharmonic.

== Publication ==
Boosey & Hawkes had originally instigated Britten to compose An American Overture, but it was Faber Music that ultimately published the score in 1983.

== Reception ==
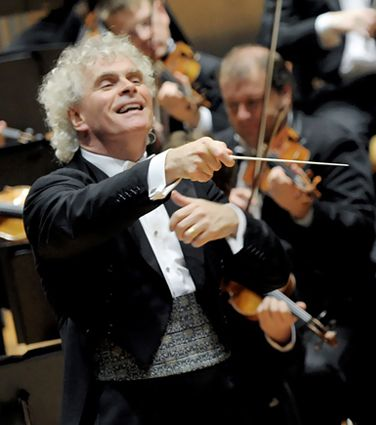
Simon Rattle conducted the world and US premieres of An American Overture.

British musical critics immediately drew comparisons between An American Overture, which originally bore the title Occasional Overture, and the unrelated Occasional Overture of 1946, which was also premiered in Birmingham in 1983. Stephen Walsh, in his review for The Guardian, appraised An American Overture as "less individual" than the later work, but commented favorably on Britten's ability to be "brash without being commonplace" in the work. He also praised the work's outer sections as its "subtlest moments" and discerned in them foreshadowings of the later Occasional Overture. Walsh said that these sections suggested "Britten hadn't wholly forgotten his American piece or that the 'occasional' idea still meant the same to him". Bayan Northcott ranked An American Overture as the inferior to the 1946 Occasional Overture in his review of the London premiere for The Sunday Telegraph. He added that the latter work had greater richness and potential. A review published in the South Wales Argus was even more critical. "Sad to report, the work is ordinary Britten" the review began, then faulted what it perceived to be the patchy orchestration and lack of luster in the coda. Gerald Larner, in another review for The Guardian, was more appreciative of the work; he called it "abundant in ideas, personality, and creative promise".

Martin Bernheimer, in his Los Angeles Times review of the American premiere, was similarly commendatory and called An American Overture a "minor gem":

It proves that [Britten], even in his mid-20s, was an independent thinker and sound craftsman. His abstract dramatic collage—brooding, sprightly, and, in turn, festive—is always clever, ultimately climactic.

Roseberry, in his 1999 overview of Britten's orchestral music, said that the work was "an eclectic response to 'American-ness'" and that he "had no hesitation in describing [it] as inspired and thoroughly characteristic".
