= Cantata academica =

Cantata academica, Op. 62
- by Benjamin Britten
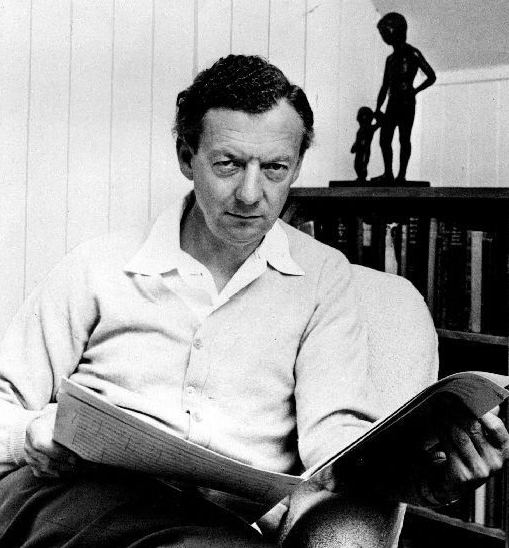
- Occasion: Quincentenary of the University of Basel
- Performed: 1 July 1960

Cantata academica, Carmen basiliense, Op. 62, is a 1959 cantata by Benjamin Britten to a Latin text. It was commissioned by Paul Sacher for the quincentenary of the University of Basel. He conducted the premiere on 1 July 1960.

== History and text ==
The cantata, completed in March 1959, was written for the 500th anniversary of the University of Basel on 1 July the following year. The Latin text, which was compiled by Bernhard Wyss, is based on the charter of the university, as well as older orations praising Basel. Britten wrote out the text for the work on the pages of his old preparatory-school German exercise book. He later used the same book to plan his War Requiem.

The work was premiered at the University of Basel on 1 July 1960, conducted by Paul Sacher; the performers were Agnes Giebel, Elsa Cavelti, Peter Pears, Heinz Rehfuss, the Basler Kammerchor, the Sterk'scher Privatchor, and the Basler Kammerorchester. The British premiere was given by the Cambridge University Musical Society in November, a few months after Britten received an honorary doctorate from the University.

== Composition ==
The cantata is scored for four vocal soloists (soprano, alto or contralto, tenor, and bass), a four-part choir, two flutes (second doubling piccolo), two oboes, two clarinets in B♭, two bassoons, four horns, two trumpets in C, three trombones, tuba, strings, timpani, four percussionists, two harps, piano, and strings.

The work is in two parts and has thirteen total sections.

Pars 1

1. Corale
2. Alla rovescio
3. Recitative (tenor)
4. Arioso (bass)
5. Duettino (soprano and alto)
6. Recitative (tenor)
7. Scherzo

Pars 2

8. Tema seriale con fuga
9. Soli et duetto (alto and bass)
10. Arioso con canto popolare
11. Recitative (tenor)
12. Canone ed istinato
13. Corale con canto

Cantata academica is formally a work of serialism, although only on a large scale, "so tightly connected with the form that it is the form itself". This reflects Britten's intention to be deliberately "clever" with the work; he noted in a letter to Wyss that the piece is "full of academic devices for the edification of the performers". The final section is "but a unifying return to the opening"; each of the others has a single "ruling note", corresponding to the 12-note series of the work, which serves as an ostinato or pedal tone for the section.

== Adaptations ==
The movement Tema seriale con fuga was adapted for two 1973 compositions by Richard Rodney Bennett dedicated to Britten: a concerto for orchestra and a work called Alba for organ. It was also used as the basis for a 1963 collaborative composition by Bennett, Nicholas Maw, and Malcolm Williamson, called Reflections on a theme of Benjamin Britten.
