= Seven Sonnets of Michelangelo =

1940 song cycle by Benjamin Britten

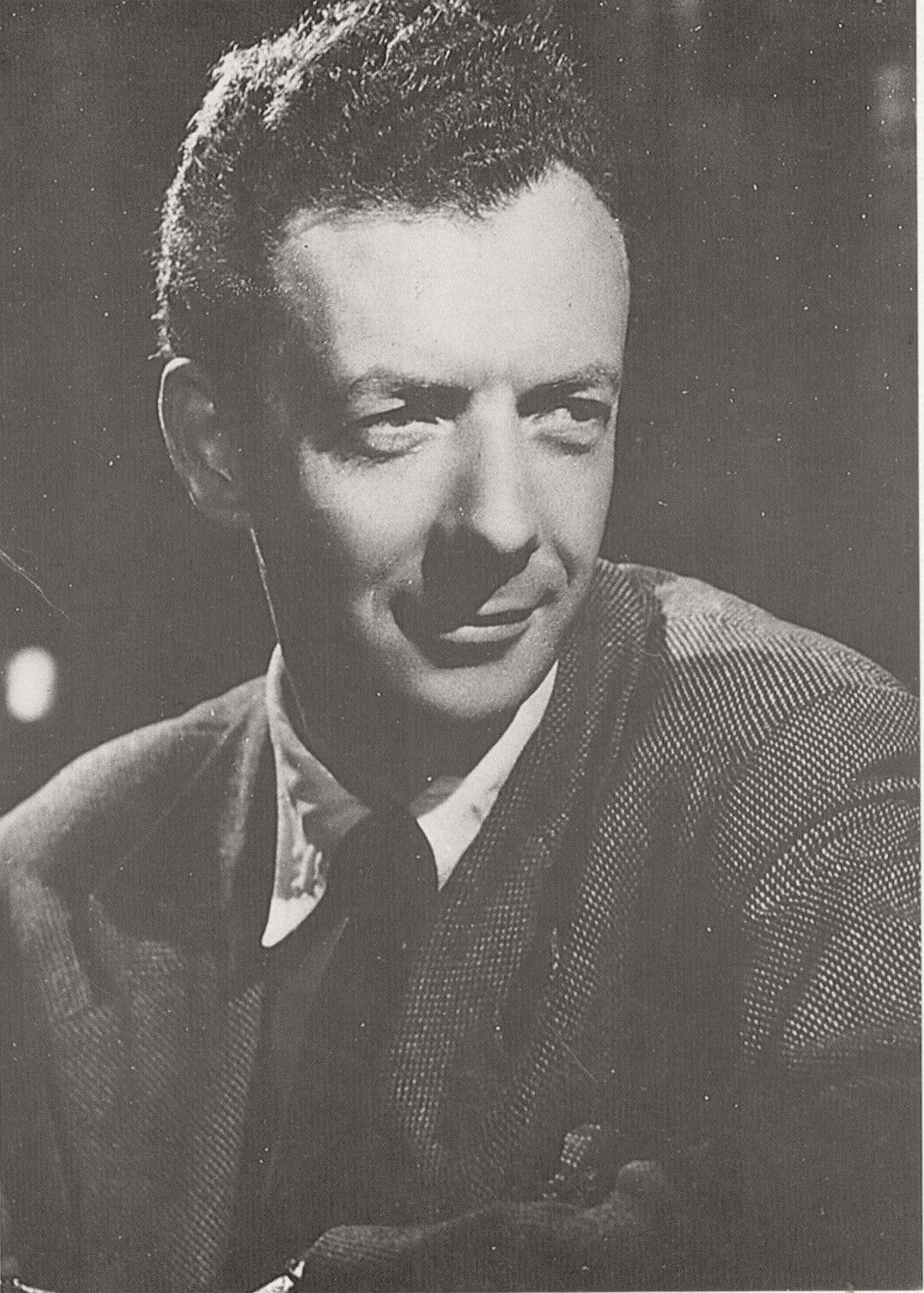
Benjamin Britten in the 1940s

Seven Sonnets of Michelangelo is a song cycle composed by Benjamin Britten (1913–76) for tenor voice and piano in 1940, and published as his Op. 22. It was written for himself and his life-partner, the tenor Peter Pears (1910–86). The manuscripts of the songs are dated between April and October 1940; but there is some evidence that the cycle had been contemplated, and even begun, as early as 1937. It consists of settings of seven sonnets, all love songs, by the Italian painter and poet Michelangelo (1475–1564), in the original language:

1. XVI: "Si come nella penna e nell'inchiostro" ("Just as in pen and ink")
2. XXXI: "A che più debb'io mai l'intensa voglia" ("To what purpose do I express my intense desire")
3. XXX: "Veggio co' bei vostri occhi un dolce lume" ("I see through your lovely eyes a sweet light")
4. LV: "Tu sa, ch'io so, signor mie, che tu sai" ("You know that I know, my lord, that you know")
5. XXXVIII: "Rendete agli occhi miei, o fonte o fiume" ("Give back to my eyes, o fountains and rivers")
6. XXXII: "S'un casto amor, s'una pietà superna" ("If there is a chaste love, a heavenly pity")
7. XXIV: "Spirto ben nato, in cui si specchia e vede" ("Noble spirit, in whom is reflected")

In 1974, Pears singled out Seven Sonnets of Michelangelo as one of the greatest works Britten had given him.
