= Sechs Hölderlin-Fragmente =

Song cycle

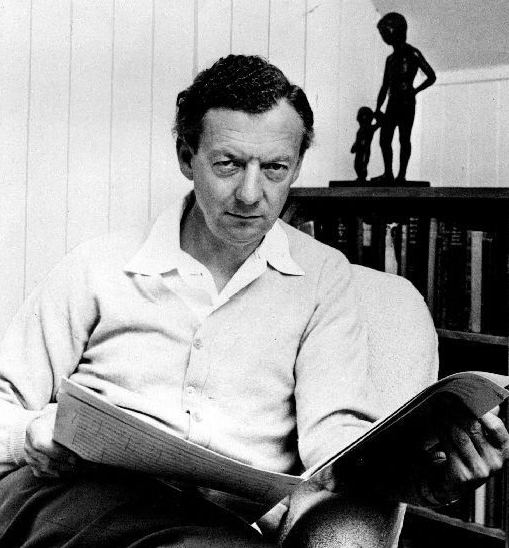
Benjamin Britten in 1968

Sechs Hölderlin-Fragmente (English: Six Hölderlin Fragments) is a song cycle for high voice and piano composed in 1958 by Benjamin Britten (1913–76), and published as his Op. 61. It consists of settings of six short poems and verse fragments by the German lyric poet Friedrich Hölderlin (1770–1843).

Britten had been introduced to the poetry of Hölderlin by Prince Ludwig of Hesse, and the cycle is dedicated to him. It was recorded by Peter Pears (tenor) and the composer (piano) and broadcast by the BBC in November 1958.

== Songs ==
A performance typically takes about 13 minutes. The songs are:

1. "Menschenbeifall" ("Public Applause")
2. "Die Heimat"" ("Home")
3. "Sokrates und Alcibiades" ("Socrates and Alcibiades")
4. "Die Jugend" ("Youth")
5. "Hälfte des Lebens" ("The Middle of Life")
6. "Die Linien des Lebens" ("The Lines of Life")
