= Advance Democracy =

1938 musical composition by Benjamin Britten

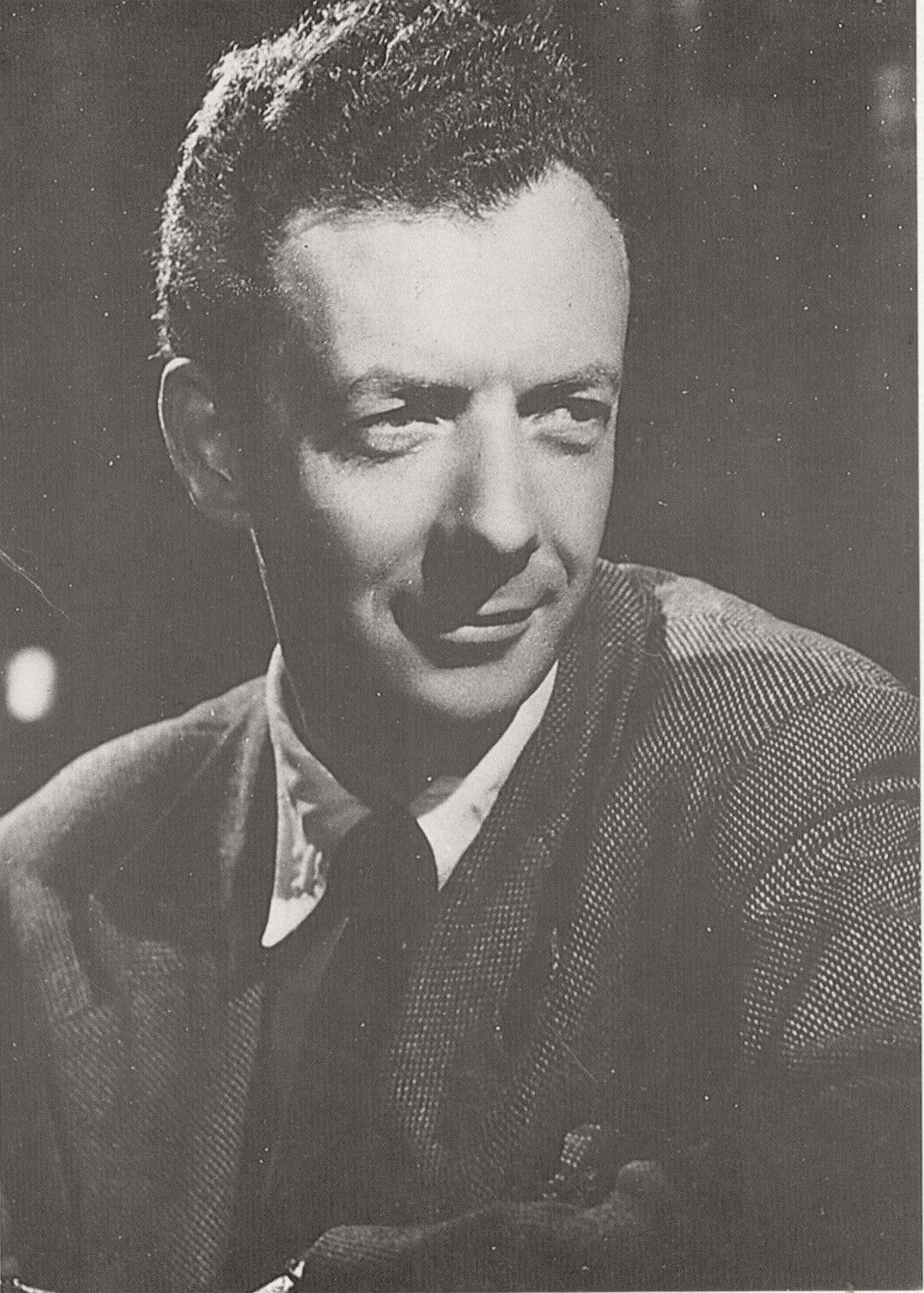
Benjamin Britten in the 1940s

Advance Democracy is a 1938 piece for unaccompanied choir by British composer Benjamin Britten.

== History ==
In 1938, in reaction to the Munich Agreement and threat posed by the Axis against the liberal order in Europe, the London Co-operative Society commissioned a propaganda piece to promote democracy. Poet Randall Swingler wrote the lyrics.

== Music ==
The piece begins with text evoking the fascist menace, with a minor key and staccato. The call to advance democracy is underlined by a bright C major.
