= Sinfonia da Requiem =

1940 composition by Benjamin Britten

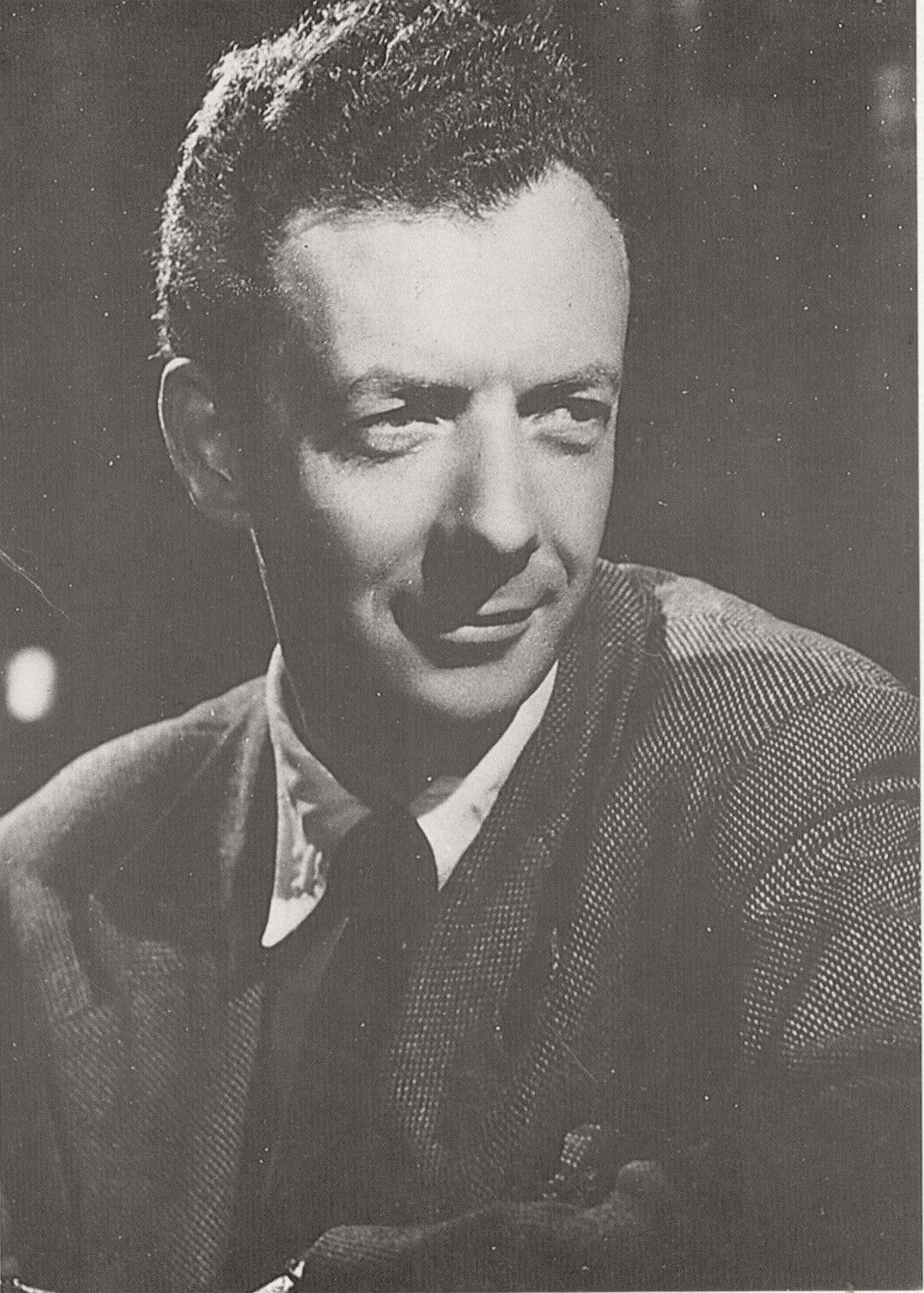
Benjamin Britten c. 1940s

Sinfonia da Requiem, Op. 20, for orchestra is a sinfonia written by Benjamin Britten in 1940 at the age of 26. It was one of several works commissioned from different composers by the Japanese government to mark Emperor Jimmu's 2600th Anniversary Celebrations of the Japanese Empire (taken to be 11 February 660 BCE from birth of Emperor Jimmu). The Japanese government rejected the Sinfonia for its use of Latin titles from the Catholic Requiem for its three movements and for its somber overall character, but it was received positively at its world premiere in New York on 29 March 1941 under John Barbirolli. A performance in Boston under Serge Koussevitzky led to the commission of the opera Peter Grimes from the Koussevitzky Music Foundations.

The Sinfonia is Britten's largest purely orchestral work for the concert hall. It was his first major orchestral work that did not include a soloist and, according to musicologist Peter Evans, marks the peak of his early writing in this idiom. Unlike many of Britten's works from this time, it has remained popular and continues to be programmed on orchestral concerts.

== History ==
In the early autumn (northern hemisphere) of 1939, Britten was approached through the British Council to write an orchestral work for a special festivity of an unspecified great power. Britten agreed in principle to this request, provided that he would not be expected to furnish a piece that was in any way jingoistic. Britten subsequently learned that the requester was Japan, whose government had requested works by composers from several countries to celebrate the 2600th anniversary of the ruling dynasty. At this point, Japan was engaged fully in its invasion of China but had not yet entered World War II formally or become allied with Nazi Germany or Fascist Italy. It had also developed a firm acquaintance with Western classical music. Performing groups trained by Western musicians were numerous. Other Western composers who received commissions included Richard Strauss, who was directed to participate by Joseph Goebbels of the Nazi German government, and French composer Jacques Ibert. Along with the Western composers invited, several Japanese composers participated in the anniversary celebrations.

Six months passed before the contract to write this work arrived. By this time, Britten had begun work on the Sinfonia. The delay in receiving the contract left him with only six weeks in which to fulfil the commission. The only work which Britten felt able to complete in time was the Sinfonia. In Britten on Music, the composer wrote that he then approached the local Japanese consul, discussed the work's nature and its suitability for the occasion for which it was intended, and told the consul of the Latin titles for the work's three movements. Britten assumed that all the information he disclosed had been forwarded to the Japanese ambassador. He wrote that he was subsequently notified that the Sinfonia would fulfill the commission satisfactorily. Britten completed the work, submitted it, and for six months heard nothing more about the matter.

In the autumn of 1940, Britten, who had left for North America in 1939, was summoned to the Japanese consulate in Boston, where he was read a long letter from Viscount Hidemaro Konoye, who served as organizer of the celebration. The Viscount was the younger brother of Prince Fumimaro Konoye, the then prime minister of Japan. In this letter, the Viscount accused Britten, as Britten later wrote, "of insulting a friendly power, of providing a Christian work where Christianity was apparently unacceptable, that the work was gloomy, and so on". This section of the letter read, "We are afraid that the composer must have greatly misunderstood our desire ... [The music] has a melancholy tone both in its melodic pattern and rhythm, making it unsuitable for performance on such an occasion as our national ceremony."

With the help of poet and fellow expatriate W.H. Auden, Britten replied in writing, "in as dignified a manner as possible", that his supplying a Christian work was no surprise, as he was a Christian and came from a Christian nation. He denied the alleged glumness of the Sinfonia and any intent of an insult, and said that the delay in receiving the contract had eliminated the possibility of composing a celebratory work within the deadline. Britten submitted this letter to the British consulate, which approved it and forwarded it to Tokyo. This was the last, he wrote, that he heard of the matter. After the attack on Pearl Harbor, relations between Britain and Japan were severed. Although the piece was rejected, the Japanese did not request the return of the commissioning fee. Instead, Viscount Konoye announced that Britten's score had arrived too late for inclusion in the celebration.

== Premiere and subsequent commission ==
The world premiere took place in Carnegie Hall, New York, on 29 March 1941 with the New York Philharmonic under John Barbirolli. The first British performance took place the following year, and its belated Japanese premiere was on 18 February 1956, with the composer conducting the NHK Symphony Orchestra. Not long after the New York premiere, Serge Koussevitzky conducted the work with the Boston Symphony Orchestra. This performance led to the Koussevitzky Music Foundations commission of Britten's opera Peter Grimes.

== Composition ==
=== Structure ===
The Sinfonia is in three movements played without a break, and a performance usually lasts around 20 minutes. Britten's analysis, quoted in the Los Angeles Philharmonic Orchestra's program notes, reads:

1. Lacrymosa. A slow marching lament in a persistent 6/8 rhythm with a strong tonal centre on D. There are three main motives: 1) a syncopated, sequential theme announced by the cellos and answered by a solo bassoon; 2) a broad theme, based on the interval of a major seventh; 3) alternating chords on flute and trombones, outlined by piano, harps and trombones. The first section of the movement is quietly pulsating; the second is a long crescendo leading to a climax based on the first cello theme. There is no pause before:
2. Dies irae. A form of Dance of Death, with occasional moments of quiet marching rhythm. The dominating motif of this movement is announced at the start by the flutes and includes an important tremolando figure. Other motives are a triplet repeated-note figure in the trumpets, a slow, smooth tune on the saxophone, and a livelier syncopated one in the brass. The scheme of the movement is a series of climaxes of which the last is the most powerful, causing the music to disintegrate and to lead directly to:
3. Requiem aeternam. Very quietly, over a background of solo strings and harps, the flutes announce the quiet D-major tune, the principal motive of the movement. There is a middle section in which the strings play a flowing melody. This grows to a short climax, but the opening tune is soon resumed, and the work ends quietly in a long sustained clarinet note.

As can be seen from the following examples, two themes provide unity between the movements. The first theme is echoed in the second and third movements, in differing tempi. In addition, the fourth theme in the second movement is modified as the opening of the third.

The headings of the three movements are taken from the Roman Catholic Mass for the dead, but the composition has no liturgical associations. Britten described the movements respectively as "a slow, marching lament", "a form of Dance of Death" and "the final resolution". All its movements have D as their tonal centre.

=== Themes ===
I. Lacrymosa

II. Dies irae

III. Requiem aeternam

=== Instrumentation ===
The score is written for 3 flutes (3rd doubling piccolo and alto flute ad lib.), 2 oboes, cor anglais, 2 clarinets in B♭, bass clarinet in B♭ (doubling E♭ clarinet), alto saxophone (ad lib.), 2 bassoons, contrabassoon, 6 horns (2 of these ad lib.), 3 trumpets, 3 trombones, tuba, timpani, bass drum, side drum, cymbals, tambourine, whip, xylophone, 2 harps (second ad lib.), piano, and strings.

=== Anti-war tone ===
According to Herbert Glass, Britten composed the Sinfonia da Requiem as a memorial to his parents. It was also an expression of the composer's lifelong pacifism and a reaction to the darkening political developments that led eventually to the Second World War. He had, in fact, recently settled in the United States because of Britain's involvement in the war. In an article published on 27 April 1940, he told the New York Sun, "I'm making it just as anti-war as possible ... I don't believe you can express social or political or economic theories in music, but by coupling new music with well-known musical phrases, I think it's possible to get over certain ideas ... all I'm sure of is my own anti-war conviction as I write it."

Britten's politically themed works before 1939 had not proved popular. While his publisher, Boosey & Hawkes, had supported him in his composition, it had also tried to encourage him to write more conventional pieces, suggesting, for example, a piano concerto for the BBC and a ballet for Sadler's Wells. The war changed all this. Before the Sinfonia, the Ballad of Heroes and Advance Democracy did well because of their political themes.

=== Place in Britten's canon ===
Musicologist Peter Evans claims that, while Diversions for Piano Left Hand and Orchestra came afterwards, the Sinfonia represents the peak of Britten's early orchestral writing.

== See also ==
- Japanese Festival Music
- Peter Grimes
- War Requiem
