= The Poet's Echo =

Song cycle composed by Benjamin Britten

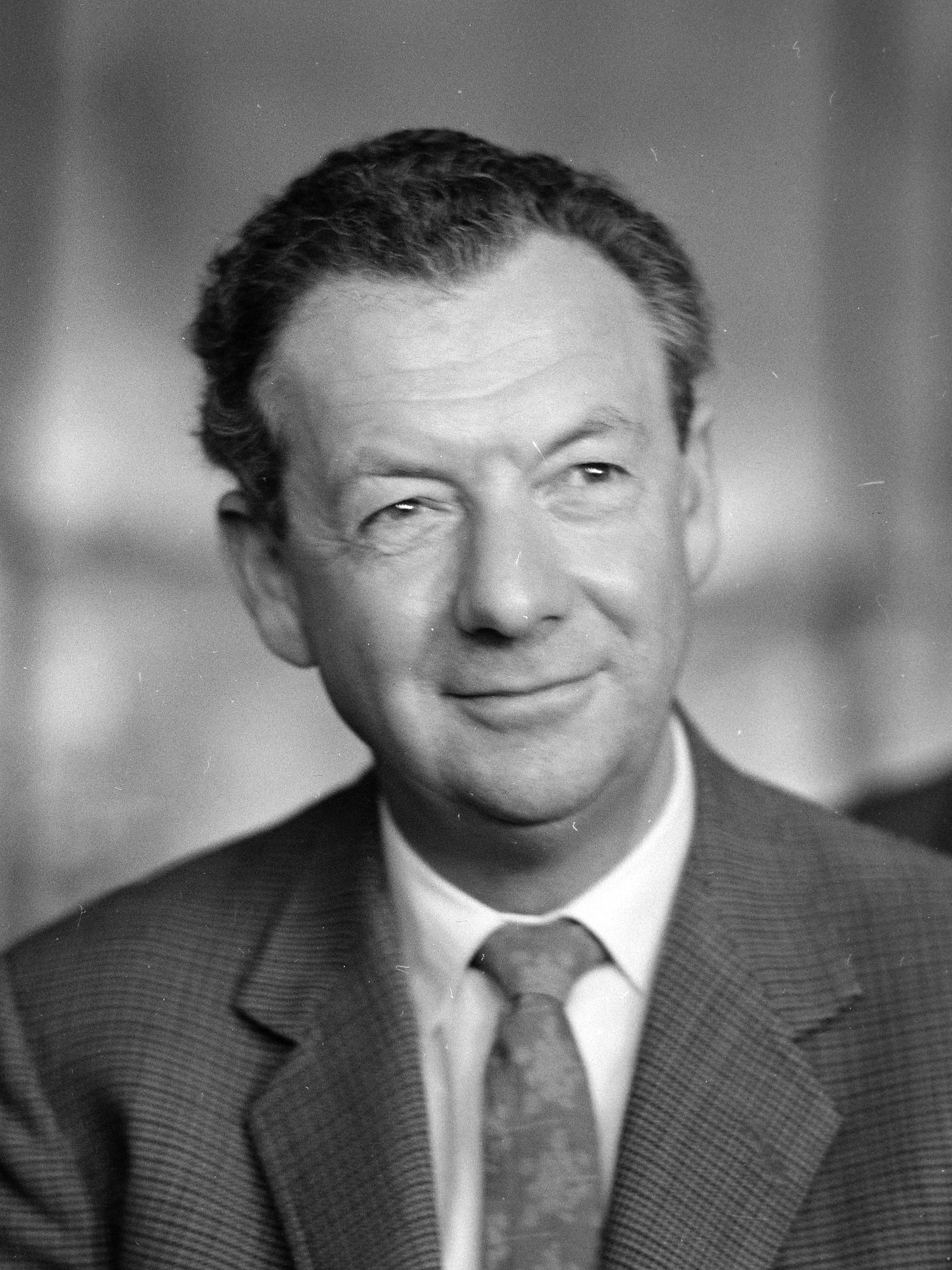
Benjamin Britten in 1965

The Poet's Echo (Russian title: Эхо поэта) is a song cycle composed by Benjamin Britten (1913–1976) in August 1965 during a holiday visit with Peter Pears to Dilijan, Armenia, during the "Days of Benjamin Britten" hosted by Soviet Armenia. It consists of settings for high voice and piano of six poems by the Russian poet Alexandr Pushkin (1799–1837), in their original language. It was published as his Op. 76.

The cycle is dedicated to his Russian friends Galina Vishnevskaya ("Galya") (soprano) and her husband Mstislav Rostropovich ("Slava") (cellist, pianist and conductor). Britten had previously dedicated several compositions for cello to Rostropovich. He had wanted Vishnevskaya to sing the soprano part in the 1962 premiere of his War Requiem, but the authorities had refused her a visa to travel outside the Soviet Union. The Poet's Echo was first performed in public by the dedicatees at the Moscow Conservatoire on 2 December 1965, by which time the composer had returned to England.

A typical performance lasts about 15 minutes. The songs are:

1. "Эхо" ("Echo")
2. "Я думал, сердце позабыло" ("My Heart")
3. "Ангел" ("Angel")
4. "Соловей и роза" ("The Nightingale and the Rose")
5. "Эпиграмма" ("Epigram")
6. "Стихи, сочинённые ночью во время бессонницы" ("Lines Written During a Sleepless Night")

Vishnevskaya has said that Britten "had succeeded in penetrating the very heart of the verse" – despite the fact that the composer had little Russian, and was working from a bilingual edition of Pushkin's poetry. She recalled a memorable evening in autumn 1965 when the tenor Peter Pears and Britten tried out the songs at the Pushkin House:

The room was cloaked in semi-darkness – only two candles burned. [...] The moment Ben [Britten] started to play the prelude [of 'Lines Written During a Sleepless Night'], which he had written to suggest the ticking of a clock, Pushkin's clock began to strike midnight, and the twelve strokes chimed in synchrony with Ben's music. We all froze. I stopped breathing and felt my scalp prickle. Pushkin's portrait was looking straight at Ben. He was shaken and pale, but didn't stop playing.

Pears confirmed the incident is his diary, though in somewhat drier terms: "Pushkin's clock joining in the song. It seemed to strike more than midnight, to go on all through the song, and afterwards we sat spell-bound".
