= Songs from the Chinese =

Song cycle by Benjamin Britten

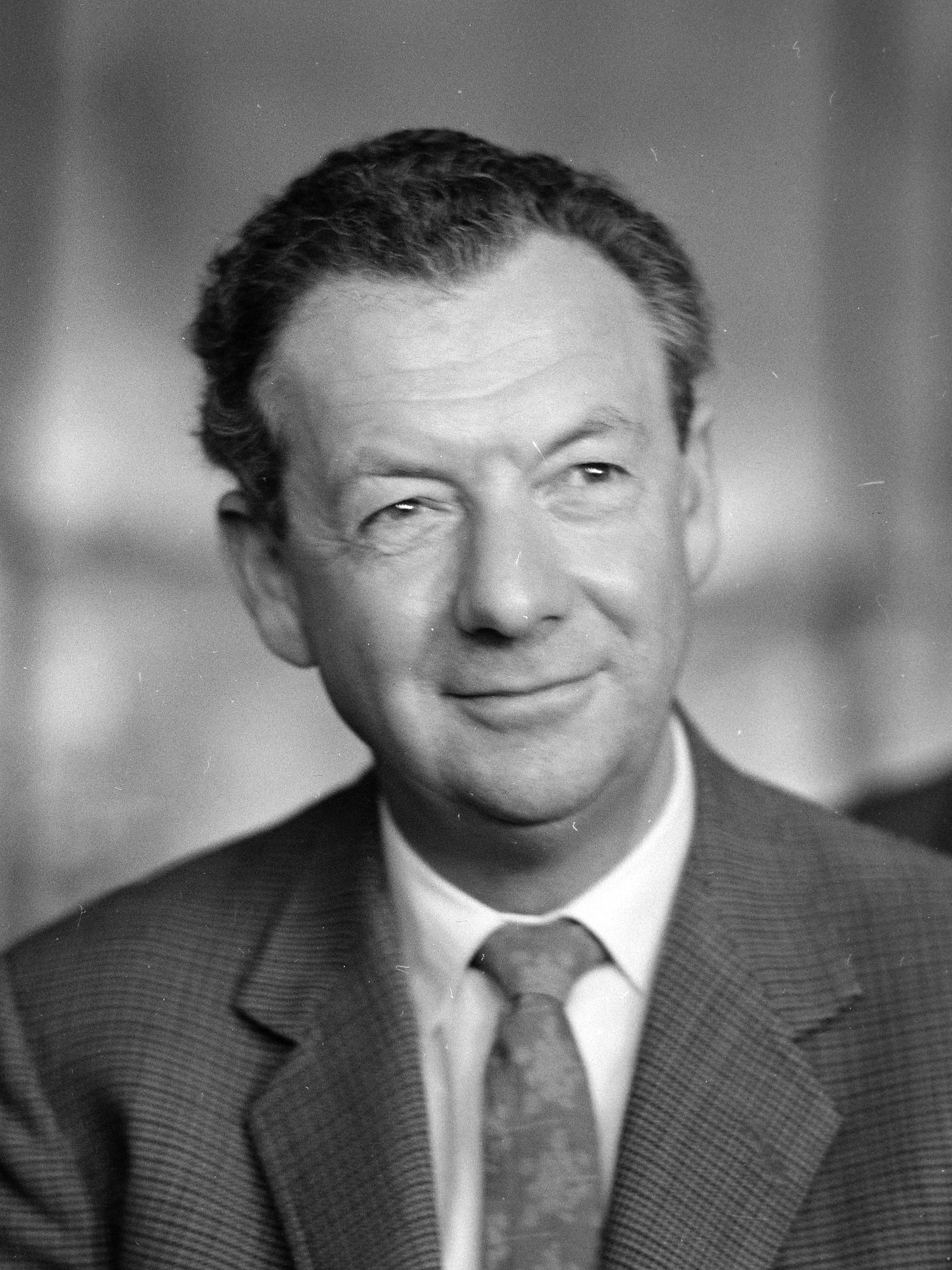
Benjamin Britten in 1965

Songs from the Chinese is a song cycle for soprano or tenor and guitar composed in 1957 by Benjamin Britten (1913–76), and published as his Op. 58. It consists of settings of six poems translated from the original Chinese by Arthur Waley (1889–1966). It was written for, and first performed by, the tenor Peter Pears and the guitarist Julian Bream.

A performance typically takes about 10 minutes. The songs are:

1. "The Big Chariot"
2. "The Old Lute"
3. "The Autumn Wind"
4. "The Herd-boy"
5. "Depression"
6. "Dance Song"

In 1959, the critic Jeremy Noble wrote "as a whole, they make a statement about life (and particularly the transience of youth and beauty) as poignant and personal as Mahler's own settings from the Chinese". (The Mahler settings are those in Das Lied von der Erde.)
