= Hymn to St Peter =

1955 cantata by Benjamin Britten

- Cantata by Benjamin Britten
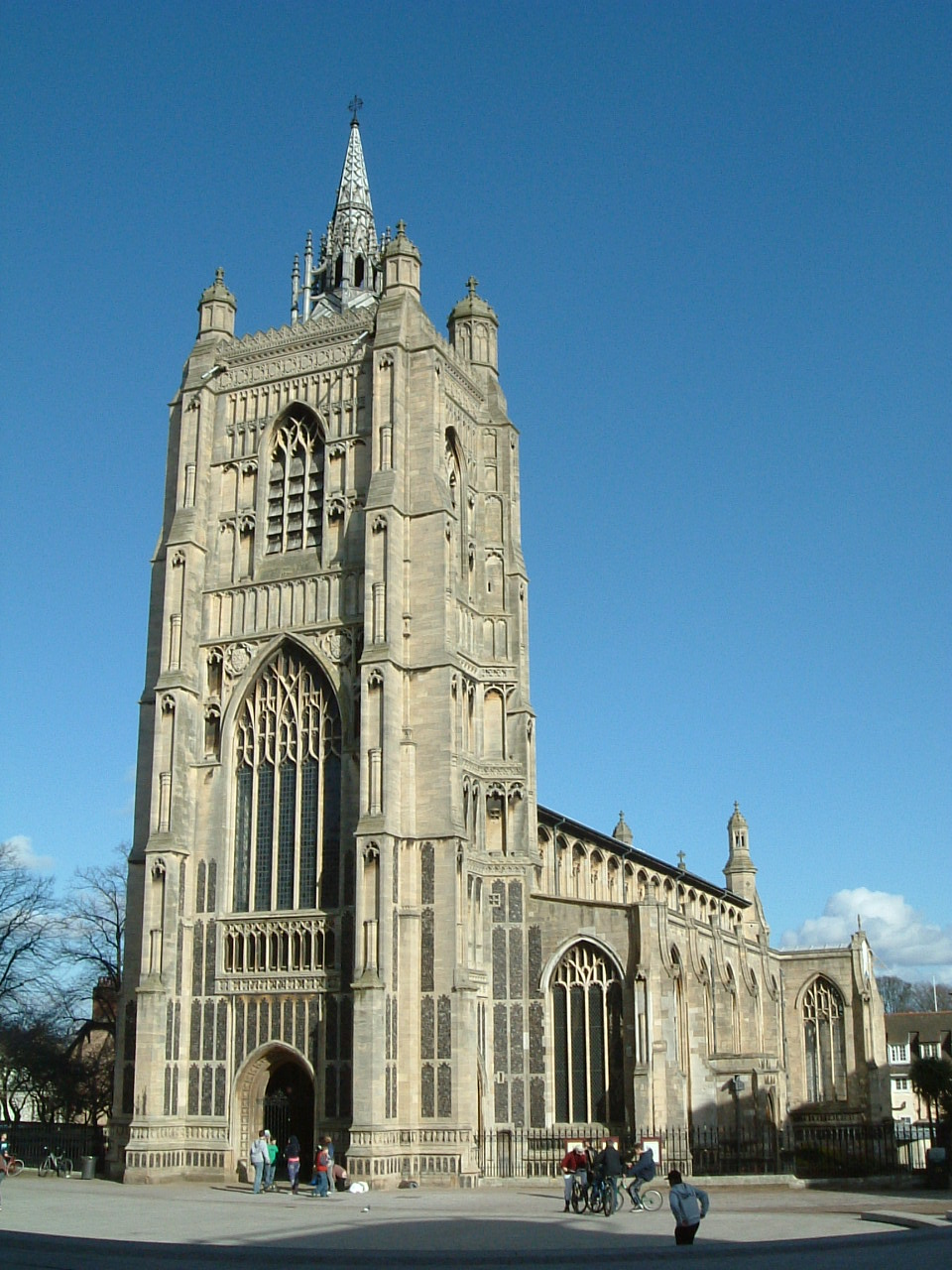
- St Peter Mancroft, Norwich
- Opus: 56a
- Occasion: 500th anniversary of St Peter, Mancroft, Norwich
- Text: Gradual of the Feast of Saints Peter and Paul
- Language: English
- Composed: 1955
- Scoring: Soloist, SATB choir and organ

Hymn to St Peter (Op. 56a) is a cantata for treble soloist, SATB choir and organ composed by Benjamin Britten in 1955. The piece was the last Britten composed before he first travelled to Asia. He set the text from the gradual of the Feast of Saints Peter and Paul to music which was based on the plainsong of the Alleluia from the hymn. The piece starts with a sombre organ theme in B♭ and when the choir joins in it is initially in unison before breaking into harmonies. After a nimble interlude that recalls children's play, the piece returns to the original theme, ending with a coda played by the organ alone. The piece was first performed at the quincentenary celebrations of St Peter Mancroft, Norwich on 20 November 1955. It was subsequently performed by The Sixteen under Harry Christophers and has frequently been sung with children's voices.

== History ==
The period between 1954 and 1963 proved one of Britten's most productive. However, 1955 was not a year dominated by composition. Britten spent much of the year performing, including tours with Peter Pears in Belgium and Switzerland and English Opera in Germany and Italy, and recording Saint Nicholas, The Little Sweep and The Turn of the Screw. Some of these were also time for relaxation, for example, skiing in Switzerland, and during these times Britten came up with ideas that formed the basis for his subsequent music.

The exact date of composition of the Hymn to St Peter is unknown, but a letter dated 2 March 1955 from BBC Birmingham confirms it was being written at the time. Britten gave the work the opus number 56a. Opus number 56b is given to an Antiphon written the following year which is treated as an independent composition. The piece was the last to be composed by Britten before he first travelled to Asia.

Hymn to St Peter was first performed at St Peter Mancroft, Norwich, as part of the church's quincentenary celebrations on 20 November 1955. It was subsequently recorded by The Sixteen, conducted by Harry Christophers along with the Missa Brevis and other pieces by Britten. Like many of Britten's compositions including the Festival Te Deum and shorter works, the piece was frequently performed with child singers. This use of children to perform complex works helped create a generation educated in English operatic works. His style also popularised a more natural "playground" children's voice in opera.

== Music and text ==
Britten composed the music for a four-part SATB choir and a single treble soloist accompanied by an organ. The piece is based on the plainsong "Tu es Petrus" (You are Peter) as found in the Alleluia and Verse for the Common of Holy Popes, which is the gradual of the Feast of Saints Peter and Paul. He used themes inspired by the pentatonic scale, with aspects reminiscent of the gamelan music which inspired many of his later works.

The music starts with an organ playing alone, in B♭, a sombre tune adapted from the plainsong of the Alleluia from the hymn, which builds up into an interwoven phrase. The hymn itself is then introduced with the words "Thou shalt make them Princes". The choir sings initially in unison but with growing harmony as the piece develops. The tune is based on the ascending pentatonic shape of the plainsong. At the words "Instead of thy fathers sons are born to thee", the music changes character radically to a nimble 6/8 figure reminiscent of the scampering of children. When the original theme returns, with the words "Therefore shall the people praise thee", the tune is in the brighter key of D major. The treble soloist enters and sings "Aedificamus Ecclesiam meam" in plainsong. The music returns to B♭ for the final section. The treble soloist sings the entire plainsong-like melody to the Latin words Tu es Petrus, while the choir answers with the English translation in soft repeated chords. The organ then plays a final ascending phrase that is pentatonic, emphasised by the final G in the coda.
