= Cello suites (Britten) =

Series of compositions by Benjamin Britten

- by Benjamin Britten
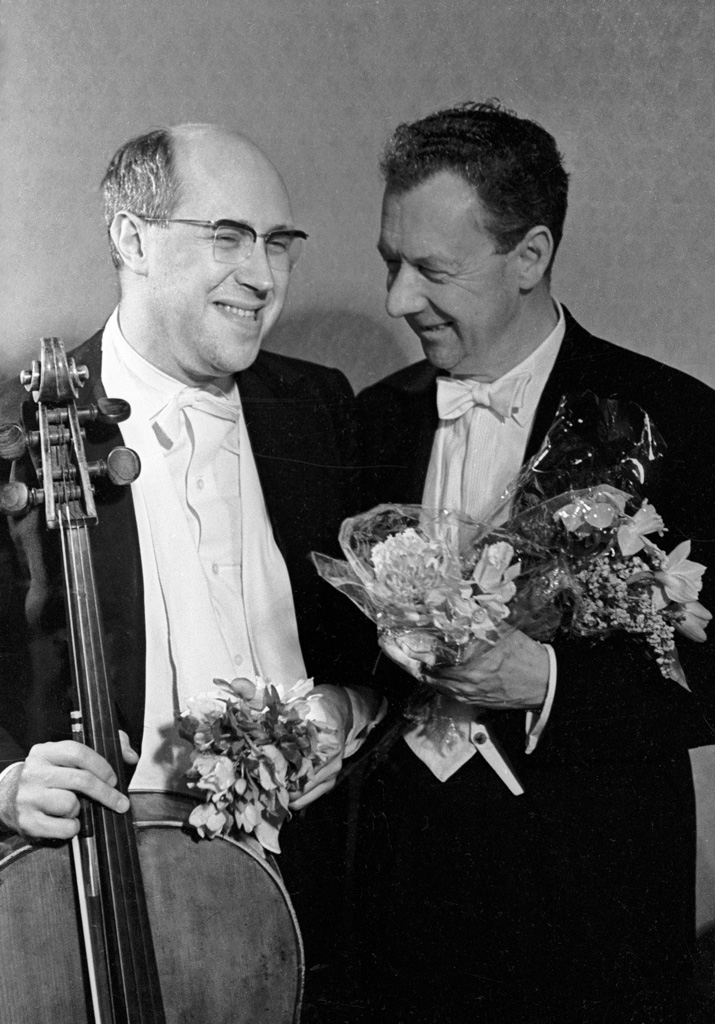
- Cellist Mstislav Rostropovich and Britten, 1964
- Opus: 72, 80, 87
- Genre: Suites
- Performed: 27 June 1965: Aldeburgh Festival (No. 1); 17 June 1968: Aldeburgh Festival (No. 2); 21 December 1974: Snape Maltings (No. 3)

The cello suites by Benjamin Britten (Opp. 72, 80, and 87) are a series of three compositions for solo cello, dedicated to Mstislav Rostropovich. The suites were the first original solo instrumental music that Britten wrote for and dedicated to Rostropovich, but Britten had earlier composed a cadenza for Joseph Haydn's Cello Concerto in C major, for Rostropovich, in 1964. Rostropovich gave the first performances of each work, and recorded Suite No. 1 and 2 commercially.

== Cello Suite No. 1, Op. 72 ==
Britten wrote the First Suite at the end of 1964. The premiere was at the Aldeburgh Festival on 27 June 1965. The suite is in nine movements, played without pause:

1. Canto primo: Sostenuto e largamente
2. Fuga: Andante moderato
3. Lamento: Lento rubato
4. Canto secondo: Sostenuto
5. Serenata: Allegretto pizzicato
6. Marcia: Alla marcia moderato
7. Canto terzo: Sostenuto
8. Bordone: Moderato quasi recitativo
9. Moto perpetuo e Canto quarto: Presto

The score was published in 1966.

== Cello Suite No. 2, Op. 80 ==
The Second Suite dates from the summer of 1967. Rostropovich gave the premiere at the Aldeburgh Festival, Snape Maltings, on 17 June 1968. The score was published in 1969. The movements are as follows:

1. Declamato: Largo
2. Fuga: Andante
3. Scherzo: Allegro molto
4. Andante lento
5. Ciaccona: Allegro

== Cello Suite No. 3, Op. 87 ==
Britten composed the Third Suite in 1971, inspired by Rostropovich's playing of the unaccompanied Cello Suites of Bach. Rostropovich first performed the suite at the Snape Maltings, 21 December 1974. In 1979 the Britten Estate authorised Julian Lloyd Webber to make the suite's first recording.

The Third Suite is in nine movements, performed without pause:

1. Introduzione: Lento
2. Marcia: Allegro
3. Canto: Con Moto
4. Barcarolla: Lento
5. Dialogo: Allegretto
6. Fuga: Andante espressivo
7. Recitativo: Fantastico
8. Moto perpetuo: Presto
9. Passacaglia: Lento solenne

The work incorporates four Russian themes, including three arrangements of folksongs by Pyotr Tchaikovsky, reminiscent of Beethoven's use of Russian themes in the Razumovsky quartets. The final Russian tune, stated simply at the end of the set, is the Kontakion of the Departed, the Russian Orthodox Hymn for the Dead. Philip Brett considers the Third Suite to be the most passionate of the three.

== Sources ==
- Philip Brett: "Benjamin Britten", Grove Music Online, ed. L. Macy.
- Aquino, F. Avellar de. "Song of Sorrow". in The Strad Magazine, London, v. 117, Vol. 1391, p. 52–57, 2006. (on Britten's Third Cello Suite)

== See also ==
- Tema "Sacher"
