= Who Are These Children? =

Song cycle by Benjamin Britten

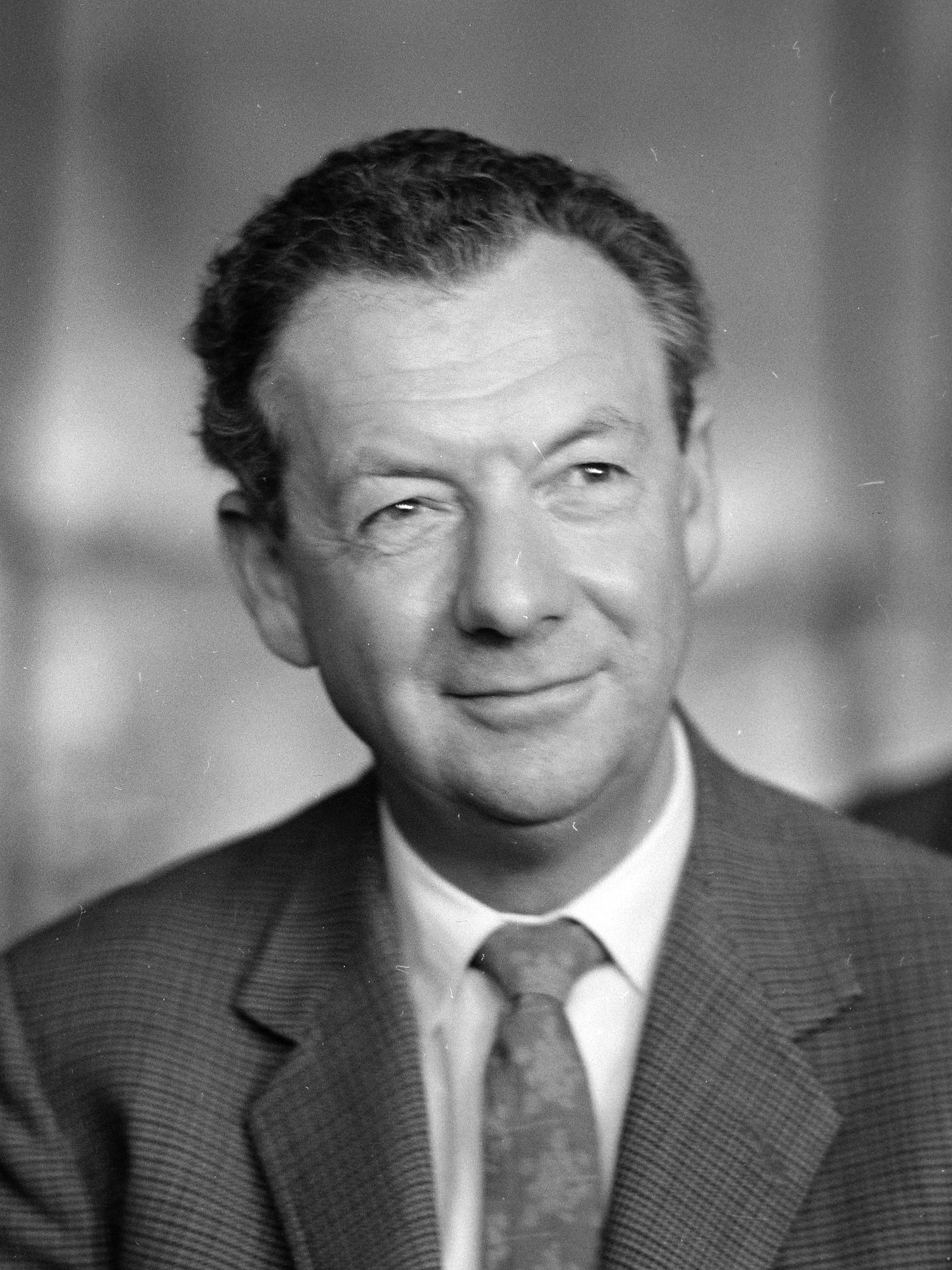
Benjamin Britten in 1965

Who Are These Children? is a song cycle for tenor and piano composed in 1969 by Benjamin Britten (1913–76), and published as his Op. 84. It consists of settings of twelve poems by the Scottish poet William Soutar (1898–1943).

It was written to mark the 700th National Galleries of Scotland Concert. It was dedicated to Tertia Liebenthal, honorary organiser of the Edinburgh lunch-hour concerts. The first performance was at Edinburgh on 4 May 1971 by Peter Pears (tenor) and the composer (piano); Liebenthal had by then died, and it was given in her memory.

The cycle was recorded by the original performers for Decca in November 1972 at The Maltings, Snape.

== Music ==
A performance typically takes about 20 minutes. The songs are:

1. "A Riddle (The Earth)"
2. "A Laddie's Sang"
3. "Nightmare"
4. "Black Day"
5. "Bed-time"
6. "Slaughter"
7. "A Riddle (The Child You Were)"
8. "The Larky Lad"
9. "Who Are These Children?"
10. "Supper"
11. "The Children"
12. "The Auld Aik"

Four of the poems (Nos. 3, 6, 9 and 11) are in Scottish Standard English; the other eight are in Lowland Scots. The latter comprise five pithy miniatures (which Soutar called "Bairn-Rhymes"), a "Bairn's Song" (No. 12) and two riddles; the former "deal with darker themes, particularly the plight of children in the context of violence and war".
