= Sinfonietta (Britten) =

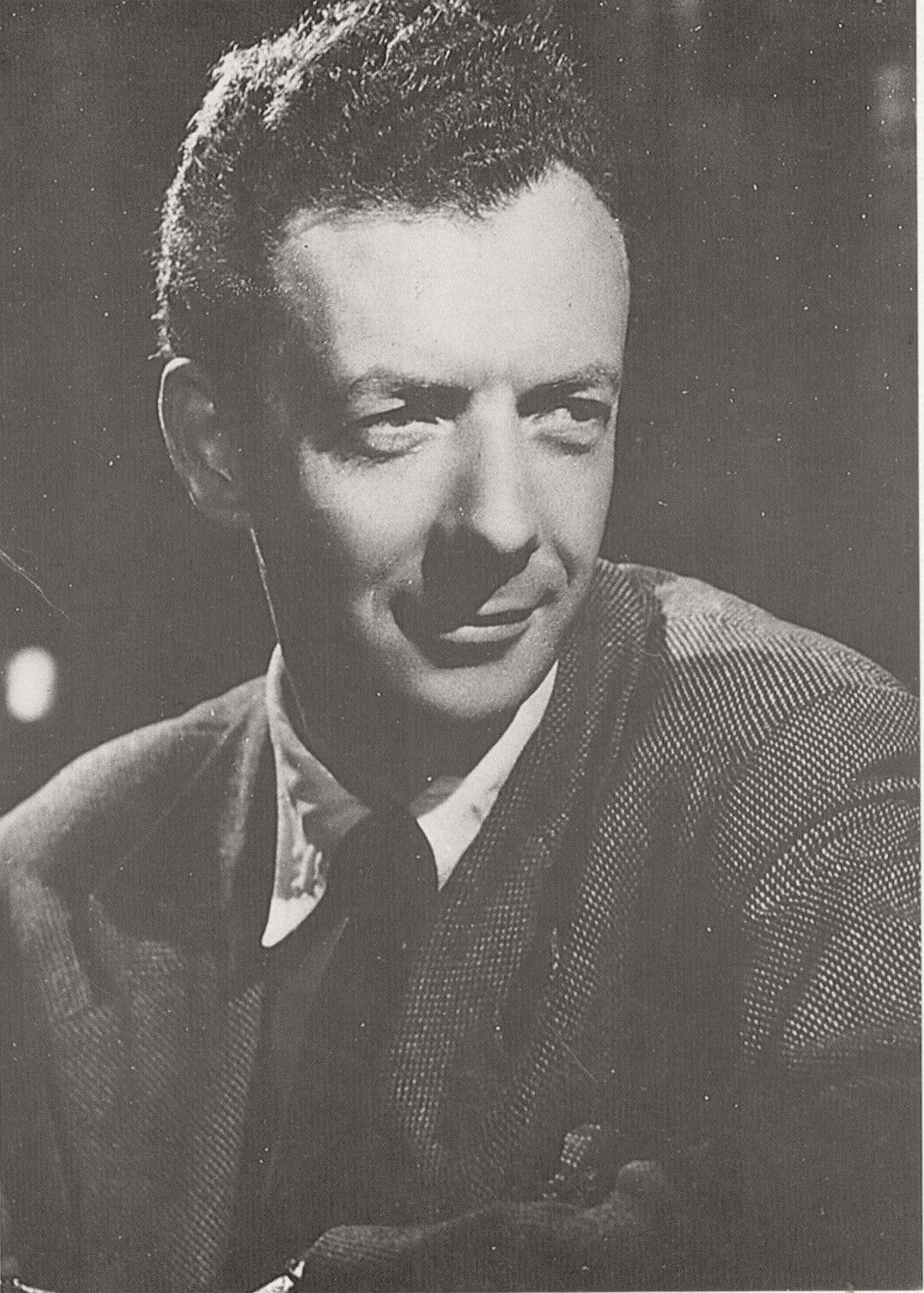
Benjamin Britten in the 1940s

Benjamin Britten's Sinfonietta was composed in 1932, at the age of 18, while he was a student at the Royal College of Music. The sinfonietta was first performed in 1933 at The Ballet Club, London conducted by Iris Lemare. It was published as his Op. 1 and dedicated to his teacher Frank Bridge.

== Instrumentation ==
The work was originally scored for five winds and five strings: flute, oboe, clarinet, bassoon, horn, two violins, viola, cello and double bass. In February 1936, Britten revised the score for a small chamber orchestra with two horns and a small string section, which was only performed once during his lifetime. This version is available on hire from Boosey and Hawkes.

== Movements ==
A typical performance takes about 15 minutes. The movements are headed:

1. Poco presto ed agitato
2. Variations, andante lento
3. Tarantella

The first movement is in sonata form. The writer, publisher and friend of Britten's Erwin Stein suggested that the work as a whole is modelled on the Chamber Symphony No. 1 of 1906 by Arnold Schoenberg.

In 1937, before Britten departed for America, his friend W. H. Auden inscribed his poem "It's Farewell to the Drawing-room's Civilised Cry" on the fly-leaf of a miniature score of the Sinfonietta. Britten was touched by the gesture.
