= Peter Evans (musicologist) =

English musicologist (1929-2018)

Peter Angus Evans
- Born: 7 November 1929; West Hartlepool, English
- Died: 1 January 2018 (aged 88)
- Occupation: Musicologist

Peter Angus Evans (7 November 1929 – 1 January 2018) was an English musicologist, most noteworthy for his book The Music of Benjamin Britten.

Evans was born in West Hartlepool and received his early education at the local Grammar school. He studied with Arthur Hutchings and A.E.F. Dickinson at Durham University from 1947 to 1951 and gained a first-class BA in 1950. He taught music at Bishop Wordsworth's School in Salisbury (1951–52) before gaining his Fellowship Diploma from the Royal College of Organists in 1952. He was then appointed a lecturer at Durham University in 1953. He graduated with a BMus from Durham in that year and took the MA with a dissertation on 17th-century chamber music manuscripts in Durham Cathedral Library. He was awarded the DMus by the university in 1958. From 1961 to 1990 he was professor of music at the University of Southampton, where two of his many achievements were the creation of a music honours degree course from inauspicious beginnings, and the addition of a fine, purpose-built performance venue, the Turner Sims Concert Hall to the University's campus (1974), in collaboration with the Southampton Institute of Sound and Vibration Research.

After his early studies of viol music, in particular that of John Jenkins, Evans worked mainly on the 20th century, writing articles on Jonathan Harvey, Alan Rawsthorne (for the 1980 edition of The New Grove) and especially on the music of Benjamin Britten. According to Grove, he brought to that subject "an acute analytical mind coupled with an approach in which musical values are firmly assigned first place".

A plaque erected in his memory in the Turner Sims, funded entirely by former students, reads: "Founder of the Department of Music ~ A brilliant musician and outstanding teacher who inspired countless students ~ His vision and drive gave rise to the Turner Sims Concert Hall ~ Remembered with gratitude and affection".

Evans died of severe double pneumonia on 1 January 2018, three-years after being diagnosed with dementia.

== Books ==
- "The Vocal Works", Michael Tippett: a Symposium, ed. I. Kemp (London, 1965), 135–61
- The Music of Benjamin Britten (London, 1979, 3/1996)
- "Synopsis: the Story, the Music not Excluded", Benjamin Britten: Death in Venice, ed. Donald Mitchell (Cambridge, 1987), 76–85
- "The Number Principle and Dramatic Momentum in Gloriana", Britten's Gloriana: Essays and Sources, ed. P. Banks (Woodbridge, Suffolk, 1993), 77–93
- "Instrumental Music, I", Music in Britain: the Twentieth Century, ed. S. Banfield (Oxford, 1995), 179–277

== Articles ==
- "Seventeenth-Century Chamber Music Manuscripts at Durham", Music & Letters, xxxvi (1955), 205–23
- "Martinů the Symphonist", Tempo, nos.55–6 (1960), 19–33
- "Compromises with Serialism", Proceedings of the Royal Musical Association, lxxxviii (1961–2), 1–15
- "Britten's 'War Requiem'", Tempo, nos.61–2 (1962), 20–39
- "Britten's Cello Symphony", Tempo, nos.66–7 (1963), 2–15
- "Musica Theoretica and Musica Practica: a Persistent Dichotomy" (Southampton, 1963) [inaugural lecture]; also pubd in Studies in Music [Australia], iii (1969), 1–16
- "Music of the European Mainstream, 1940–1960", The New Oxford History of Music, x (1974), 387–502
