= 1991 Special Honours (New Zealand) =

Awards list for New Zealand

The 1991 Special Honours in New Zealand was a Special Honours Lists, dated 14 November 1991, recognising service by New Zealand military personnel in the Persian Gulf region and members of New Zealand expeditions to the Antarctic.

== Order of the British Empire ==
=== Member (MBE) ===
Additional, military division

- Warrant Officer Patrick Grant McKay – Royal New Zealand Air Force. In recognition of service within the operations in the Persian Gulf region.

== British Empire Medal (BEM) ==
Military division

- Flight Sergeant Mark MacDonald Harwood – Royal New Zealand Air Force. In recognition of service within the operations in the Persian Gulf region.
- Sergeant Robert Mataroa – Royal New Zealand Air Force. In recognition of service within the operations in the Persian Gulf region.

== Air Force Cross (AFC) ==
- Wing Commander Robert Gordon Henderson – Royal New Zealand Air Force. In recognition of service within the operations in the Persian Gulf region.

== Air Force Medal (AFM) ==
- Master Air Loadmaster Grant Travis Harold Mindon Roberts – Royal New Zealand Air Force. In recognition of service within the operations in the Persian Gulf region.

== Polar Medal ==
With clasp "Antarctic 1959–1990"

- Graeme Geoffrey Claridge – of Wellington. For valuable services as a member of New Zealand expeditions to Antarctica in recent years.

With clasp "Antarctic 1964–1990"

- Dr Iain Bruce Campbell – of Nelson. For valuable services as a member of New Zealand expeditions to Antarctica in recent years.

With clasp "Antarctic 1981–1990"

- Dr John Alan MacDonald – of Auckland. For valuable services as a member of New Zealand expeditions to Antarctica in recent years.
