= 1976 New Zealand bravery awards =

The 1976 New Zealand bravery awards were announced via a Special Honours List dated 2 September 1976, and recognised one person for an act of bravery earlier that year.

== Queen's Commendation for Brave Conduct ==
- Peter John Joseph Mechen – lately Wellington City Corporation Passenger Transport Department.

For services on the morning of 22 April 1976 when the fully laden passenger bus he was driving went out of control down Bowen Street in the City of Wellington. He remained calm and showed initiative by directing the vehicle into a grass bank thereby averting serious injuries and possible loss of life not only to his passengers but to pedestrians and other road users. It is obvious that the safety of his passengers and others was foremost in his mind.
