= Archie Miller-Bakewell =

British courtier

- Military career
- Allegiance: United Kingdom
- Branch: British Army
- Service years: 1975–2010
- Rank: Brigadier
- Conflicts: Operation Banner (1996–1997)
- Awards: Queen's Commendation for Valuable Service; Commander of the Royal Victorian Order

Brigadier Archibald John Miller-Bakewell CVO is a former British Army officer and royal aide. After attending the Royal Military Academy Sandhurst, he joined the British Army Household Cavalry regiment the Blues and Royals (Royal Horse Guards and 1st Dragoons) in 1975. Miller-Bakewell reached the rank of lieutenant colonel in the regiment in 1991 and transferred to the Scots Guards, a foot guards regiment, in 1994. He served on Operation Banner in Northern Ireland in 1996–1997, for which he received the Queen's Commendation for Valuable Service. Miller-Bakewell became a brigadier in 2004 and retired at this rank in 2010. After retirement he became private secretary and treasurer to Prince Philip, Duke of Edinburgh. He held the role until the duke's death in 2021 and took part in his funeral procession.

== Army career ==
Miller-Bakewell attended the Royal Military Academy Sandhurst. After graduation he received a regular (i.e. non-short service) commission as a second lieutenant in the Blues and Royals (Royal Horse Guards and 1st Dragoons) on 8 March 1975. Miller-Bakewell's commission was confirmed on 9 August 1975. He was promoted to lieutenant on 8 March 1977 and to captain on 8 September 1981. Remaining in the same regiment, he was promoted to major on 30 September 1986 and to lieutenant colonel on 30 June 1991.

Miller-Bakewell transferred to the Scots Guards on 12 December 1994. He served on Operation Banner in Northern Ireland for a period in 1996–1997 and, on 5 December 1997, received the Queen's Commendation for Valuable Service for his work on this deployment. Miller-Bakewell was promoted to colonel on 30 June 1998 and to brigadier on 30 June 2004. He retired from the British Army on 28 July 2010, joining the Reserve of Officers.

== Royal aide ==
In 2010 Miller-Bakewell became private secretary and treasurer to Prince Philip, Duke of Edinburgh, a role he held until the duke's death on 9 April 2021. The i newspaper described Miller-Bakewell as "somewhat of a right hand man" to the duke and is thought to have been responsible for managing the duke's diary and public engagements. On occasion Miller-Bakewell stood in for the duke when he was unable to attend an official event. He remained in the role after the duke's retirement from public duties in 2017.

Miller-Bakewell registered the duke's death with the Royal Borough of Windsor and Maidenhead on 13 April 2021. Miller-Bakewell took part in the duke's 17 April funeral. He walked in the funeral procession behind the duke's hearse and senior members of the royal family. He walked alongside other royal staff (two pages and two valets) and a police royal protection officer. Despite pre-event speculation, he was not one of the thirty attendees permitted to attend the funeral service at St George's Chapel, Windsor Castle, under the government restrictions on funeral attendance numbers due to the COVID-19 pandemic. The attendees were all members of the British or foreign royal families.

On 11 June 2021, in the 2021 Demise Honours, Miller-Bakewell was appointed a commander of the Royal Victorian Order. Appointments to the order are made at the personal discretion of Elizabeth II and the honours were announced on 10 June, which would have been the duke's 100th birthday.
