= Death and funeral of Prince Philip, Duke of Edinburgh =

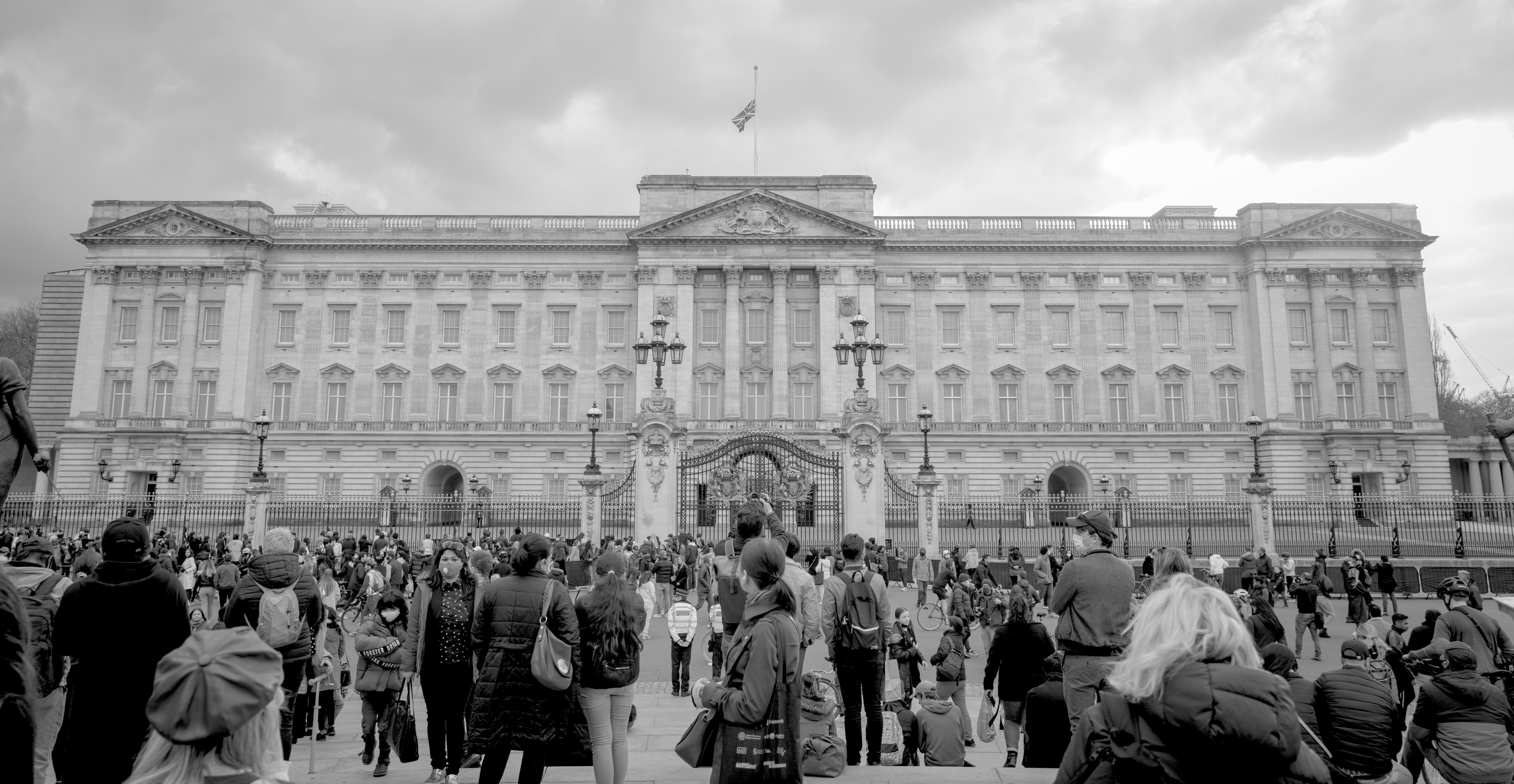
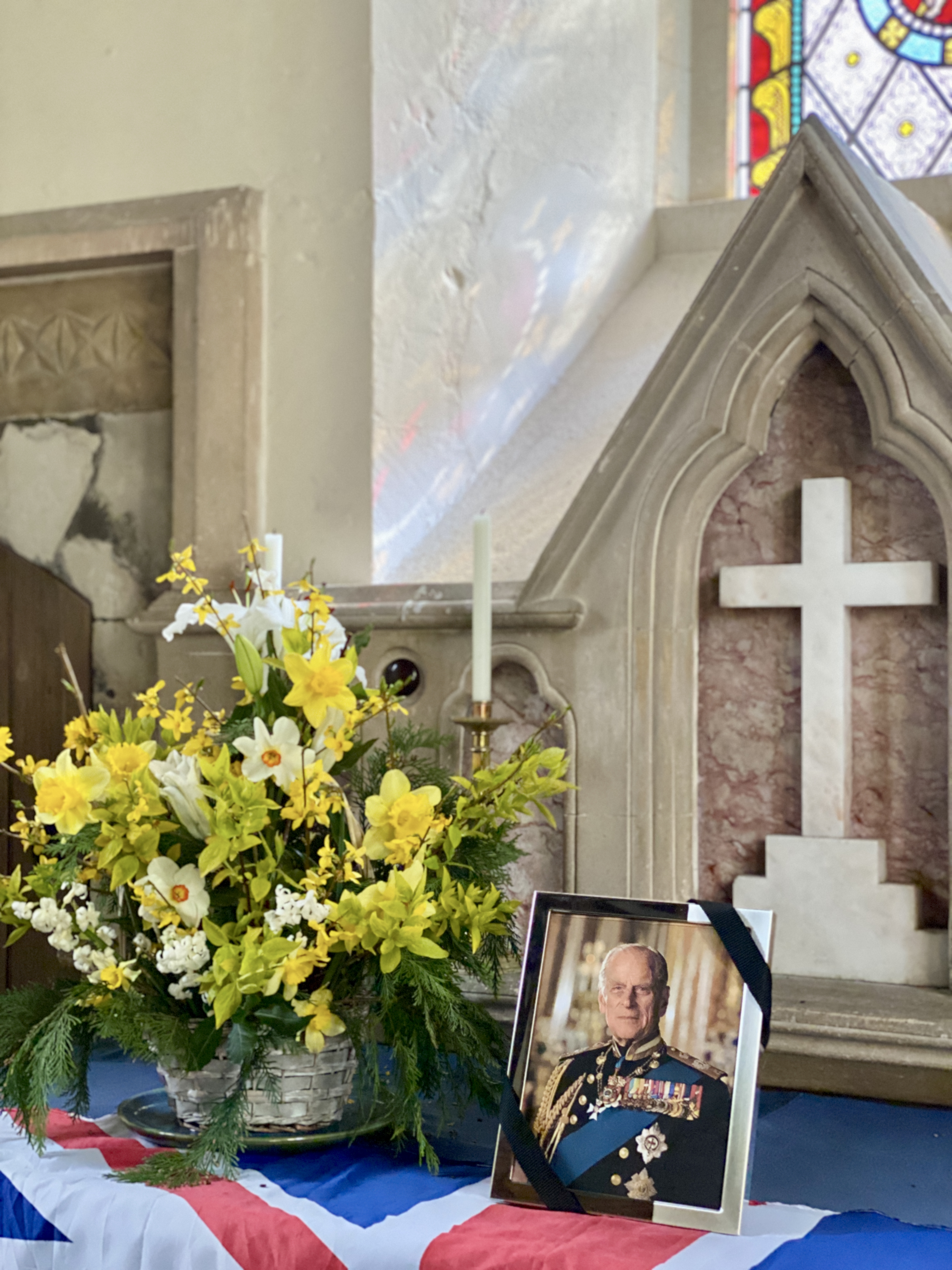
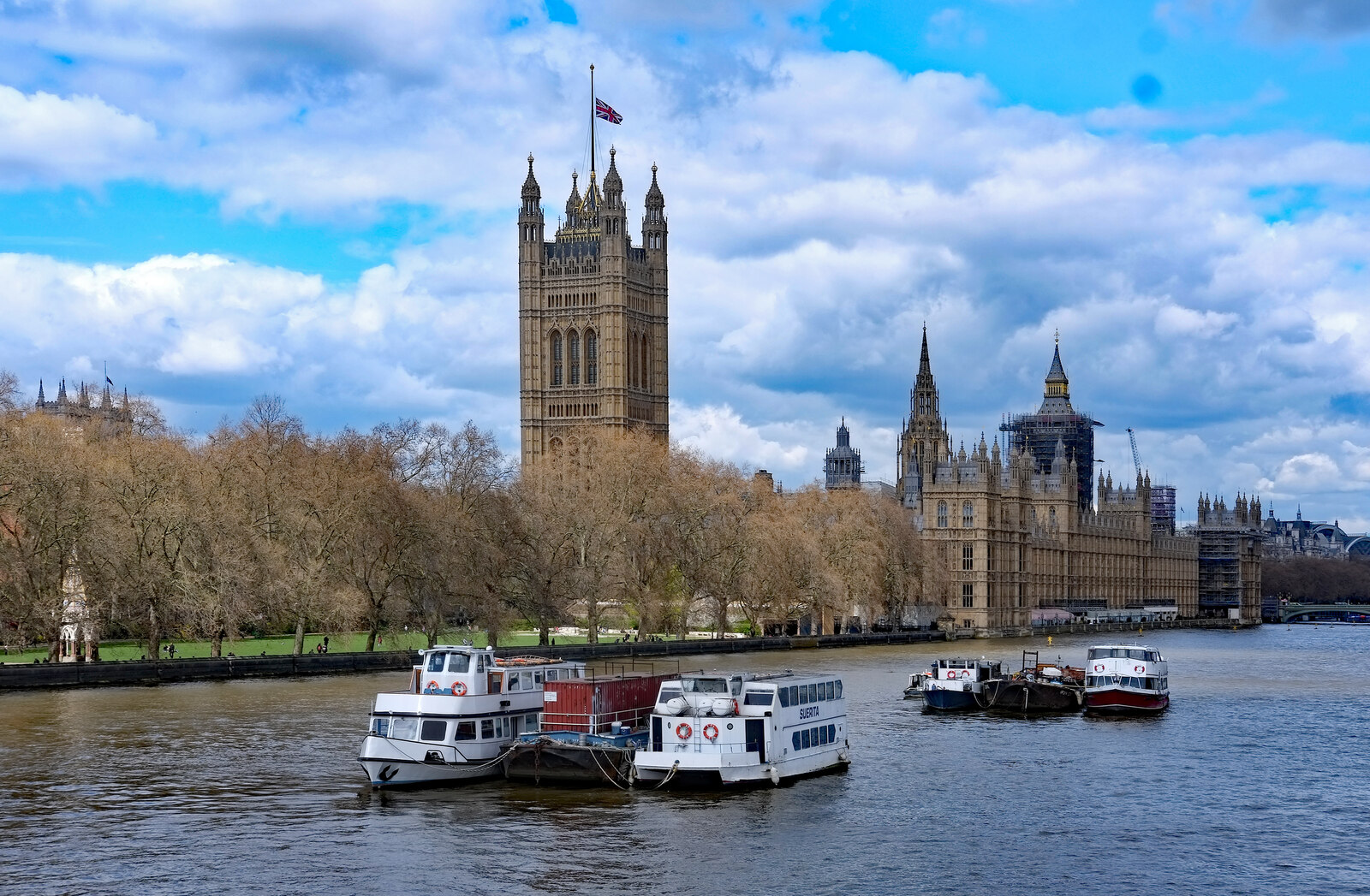
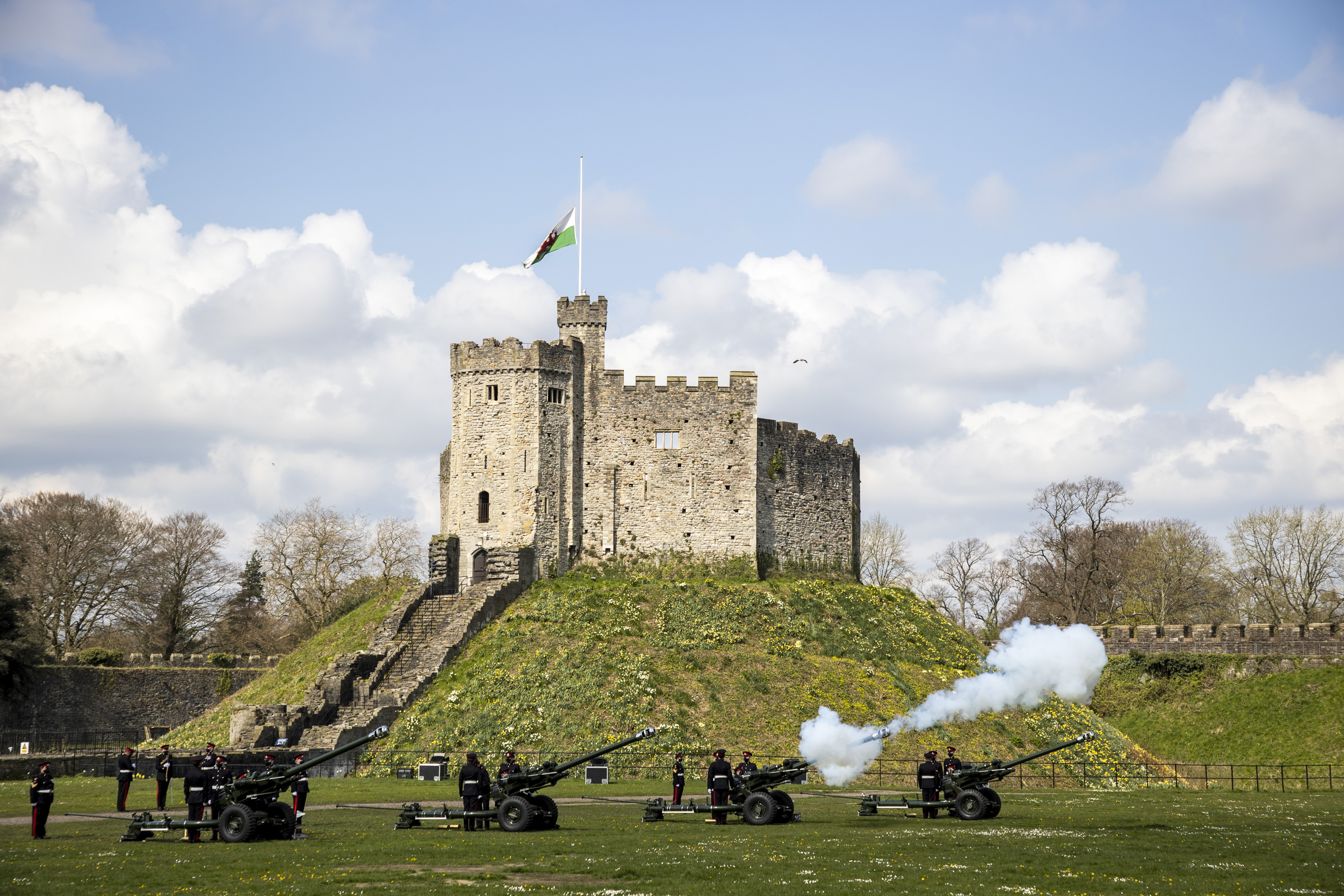
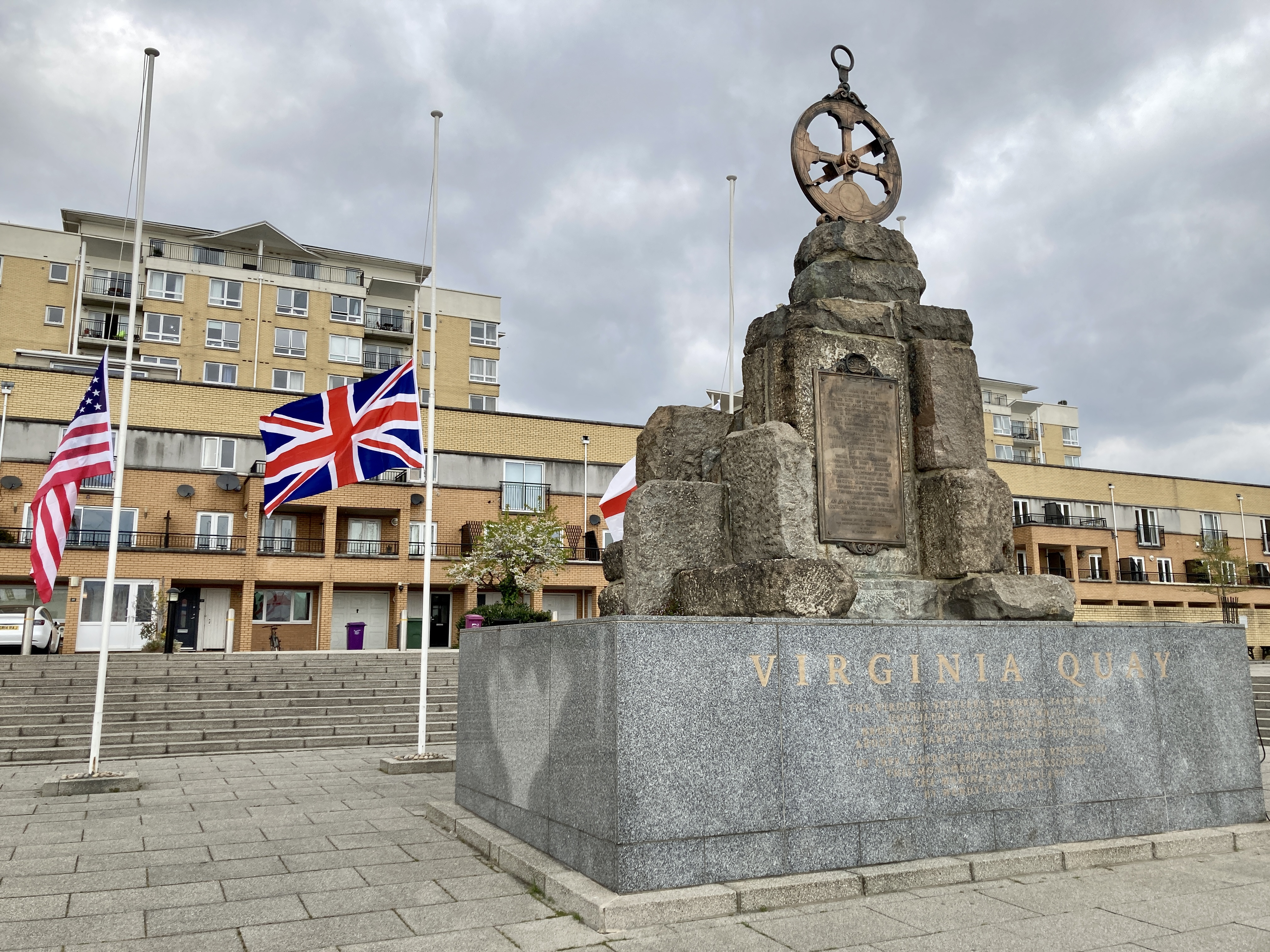
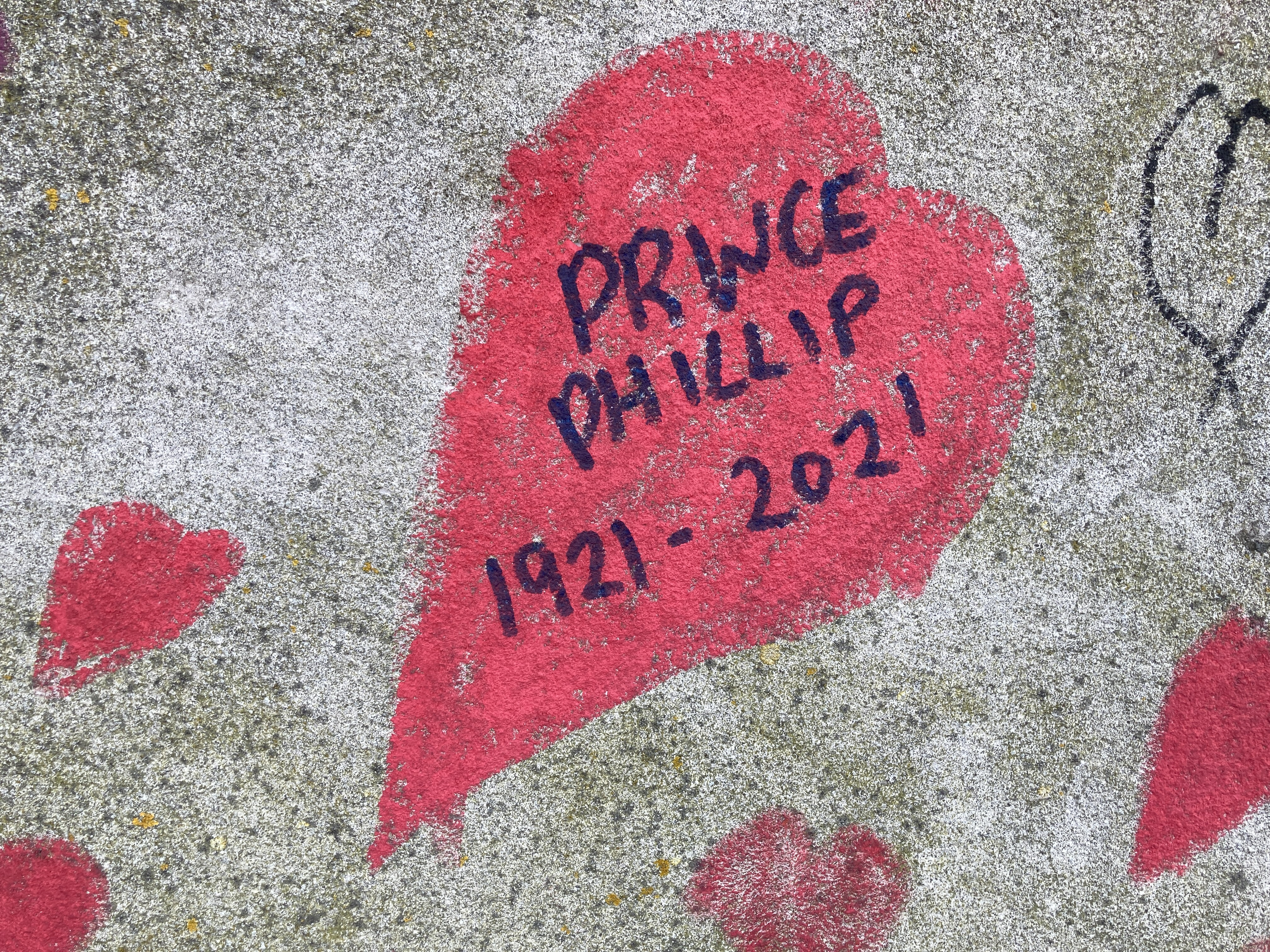
- Top to bottom, left to right: Crowds at Buckingham Palace following the death of Prince Philip; A memorial and prayer for Philip in Litchfield; The Union Jack flying at half-mast at the Palace of Westminster; 104th Regiment Royal Artillery firing a Death Gun Salute at Cardiff Castle; Flags flying at half-mast near the Virginia Settlers' Monument in London; A graffito with Philip's name (misspelt) on a wall in London
- Date: 9 April 2021 (death); 17 April 2021, 14:40–15:50 (BST) (ceremonial funeral); 29 March 2022, 11:30–12:15 (GMT) (thanksgiving service)
- Location: Windsor Castle, Berkshire (death); St George's Chapel, Windsor Castle (funeral and burial); Westminster Abbey, London (thanksgiving service); 51°29′1″N 00°36′25″W
- Participants: Funeral attendees; Thanksgiving service guests

On 9 April 2021, Prince Philip, Duke of Edinburgh, the husband of Queen Elizabeth II of the United Kingdom and the other Commonwealth realms, and the longest-serving royal consort in history, died of old age at Windsor Castle at the age of 99.

It set in motion Operation Forth Bridge, a plan detailing procedures including the dissemination of information, national mourning, and his funeral. Philip had indicated wishes for a smaller funeral, although amendments were still made to the plan to bring his service in line with COVID-19 regulations, including quarantine for members of his family travelling from abroad. His funeral took place on 17 April 2021.

Representatives of nations and groups around the world sent condolences to Elizabeth, the British royal family, and citizens of the Commonwealth of Nations. Flowers and messages of condolence were left by the public at Buckingham Palace and Windsor Castle, with members of the royal family publicly paying tribute to Philip in the days after his death.

A thanksgiving service attended by politicians and foreign royalty was held at Westminster Abbey on 29 March 2022, which included elements that could not be implemented in the funeral ceremony due to COVID-19 restrictions.

== Health issues and death ==
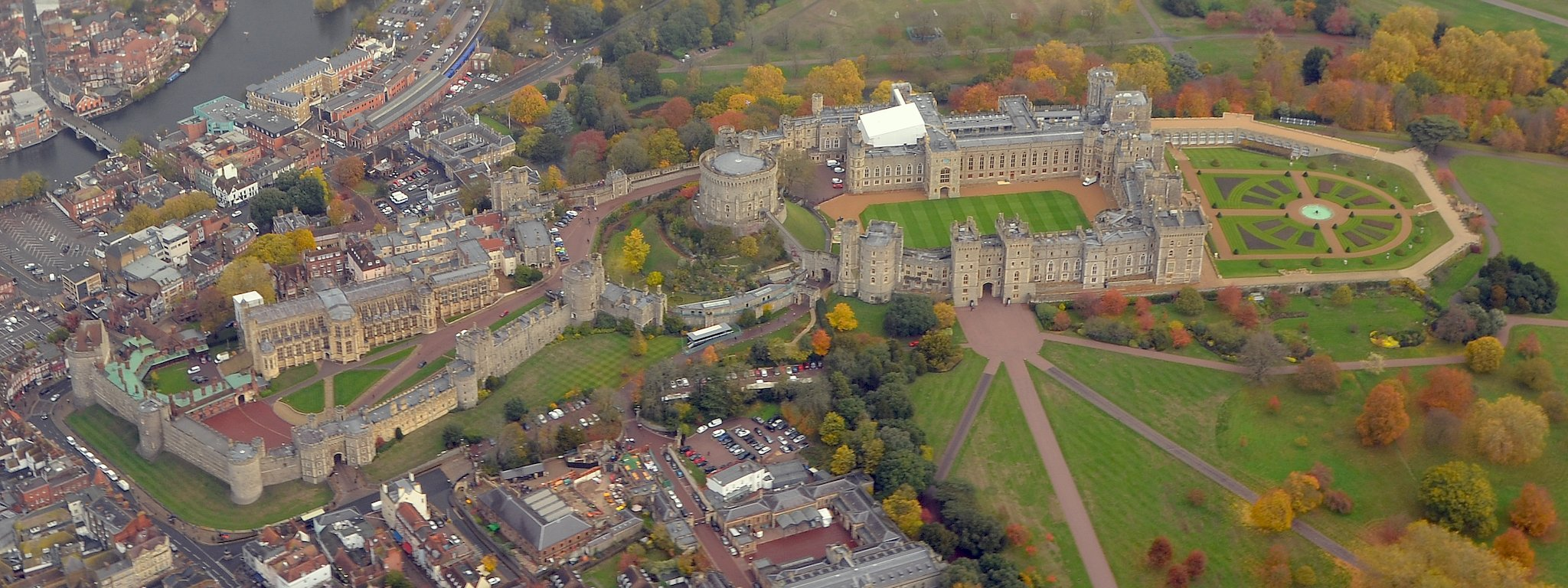
Windsor Castle photographed in 2019; it was here that the Duke died, and that his funeral and burial took place.

Prince Philip, Duke of Edinburgh, had several hospital stays in the years leading up to his death. In 2012 he was admitted to hospital with a bladder infection. He had exploratory surgery on his abdomen in June 2013, and he underwent hip replacement surgery in April 2018.

On 16 February 2021 the Duke was admitted to King Edward VII's Hospital as a precautionary measure after feeling unwell. On 1 March he was transferred to St Bartholomew's Hospital, and two days later he underwent a successful procedure for his existing heart condition. On 5 March he was transferred back to King Edward's, and on 16 March he was discharged and returned to Windsor Castle.

Three weeks after his return from hospital, his death was announced by the royal family at noon BST on 9 April 2021, with the release of a statement saying he had "died peacefully" that morning at Windsor Castle. His daughter-in-law Sophie, Countess of Wessex and Forfar, described his death as "...so gentle. It was just like somebody took him by the hand and off he went." Despite initial reports that the Queen was at her husband's bedside when he died, a biography by Hugo Vickers stated that she was not present at his side. The death certificate, certified by Sir Huw Thomas, head of the Royal Medical Household, stated the cause of death as "old age".

== Operation Forth Bridge ==
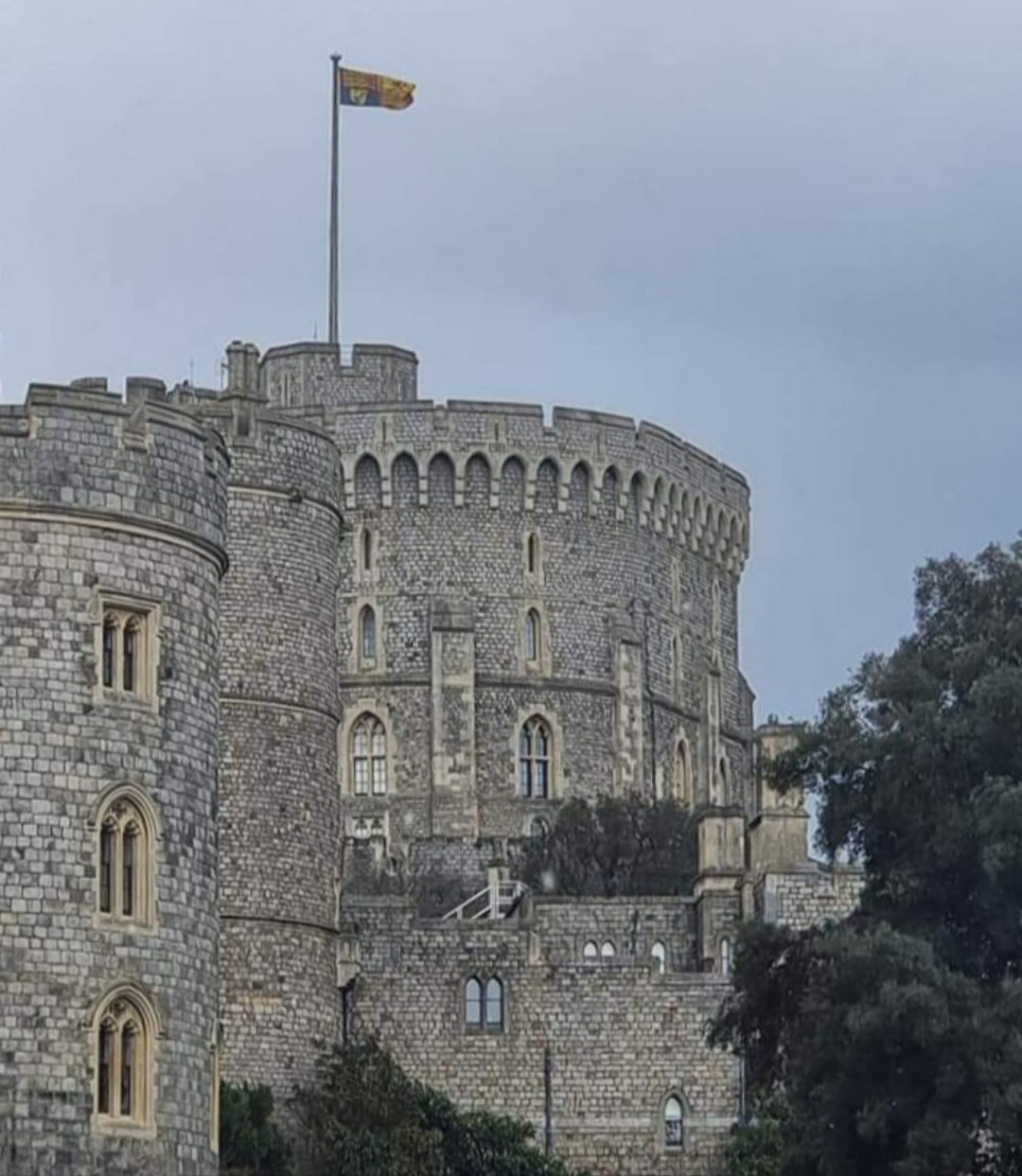
The Royal Standard flying at full-mast at Windsor Castle on 11 April

The national plan for publicly handling the Duke's death was called Operation Forth Bridge, named after the Forth Bridge near Edinburgh, the city of his dukedom. According to the College of Arms, the original plan was amended in light of the COVID-19 pandemic.

Initiated upon his death, the plan included a press release issued by Buckingham Palace simultaneously to the BBC, the national broadcaster of the United Kingdom, and PA Media; protocol assumes the Lord Chamberlain consulted with the Queen prior to the press release. The plan included duties to disseminate the news across the Commonwealth of Nations. In Australia, one of the Commonwealth realms of which Elizabeth was queen, the responsibility to inform the government and public was that of Governor-General David Hurley.

At the time of the release, flags were lowered to half-mast, where they remained for a period of national mourning lasting until 8 am on the day following the Duke's funeral. All Union Flags and national flags were lowered, and government guidance suggested that other flags on governmental buildings – for example, flags of the Armed Forces or Pride flags – be replaced with a Union Flag at half-mast for the mourning period. However, the Royal Standard continued to be flown at full-mast at Windsor Castle, as it represents the presence of the living monarch.

At 6 pm on 9 April, the tenor bell of Westminster Abbey began ringing, and was tolled once every minute for 99 minutes, to reflect the Duke's lifespan, the custom known as the death knell.

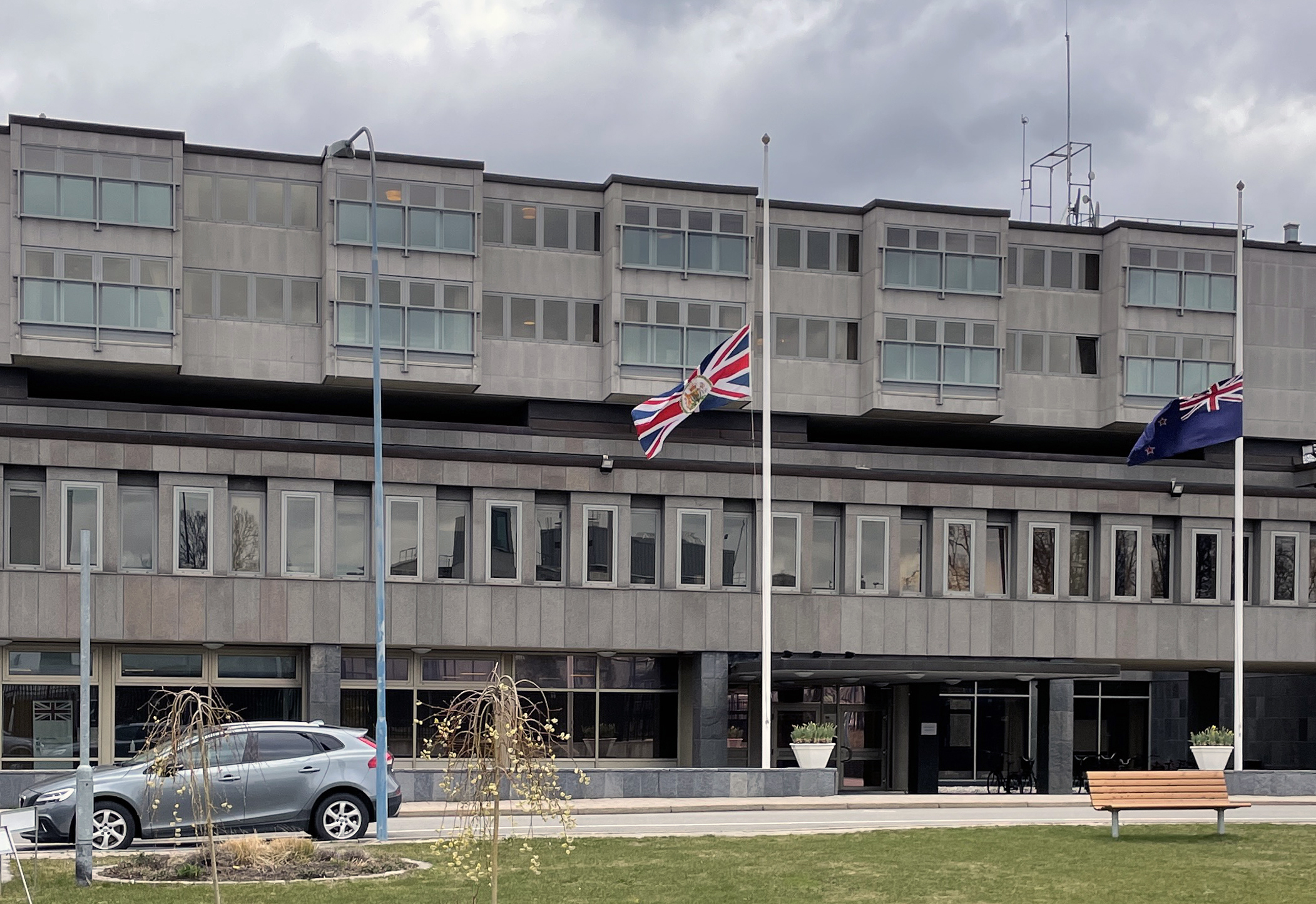
The British and New Zealand embassies in Stockholm with flags at half-mast on 9 April

The majority of military rehearsals for the funeral procession took place at Pirbright Camp and a full dress rehearsal took place at Windsor Castle on 15 April.

== Funeral ==
The funeral took place on 17 April 2021 at St George's Chapel, Windsor Castle.

=== Procession and service ===
The Duke was given a royal ceremonial funeral, not a state funeral, which is usually reserved for monarchs. He had indicated a wish for minimal "fuss"; as such, he did not lie in state, though he did "lie at rest" in the private chapel at Windsor Castle. Prior to the service, the coffin was moved from this chapel to the Inner Hall of the castle, where prayers were said. The Duke's wishes were said to be for a military funeral conducted at St George's Chapel and burial in King George VI Memorial Chapel alongside King George VI, Queen Elizabeth the Queen Mother, Princess Margaret and his wife, Queen Elizabeth II after her death. This royal ceremonial funeral is the same level of honour as those given to his former daughter in law Diana, Princess of Wales, in 1997 and to his mother in law, Queen Elizabeth the Queen Mother, in 2002. As with the services for Diana and the Queen Mother, the funeral of Prince Philip was televised.

Before the service, bands from the armed services were marched onto the Quadrangle of Windsor Castle. They performed music including "Jerusalem", "I Vow to Thee, My Country", "Supreme Sacrifice", "Isle of Beauty" and "Nimrod".

The Duke of Edinburgh's coffin was draped with his personal standard (1st quarter representing Denmark, 2nd quarter Greece, 3rd quarter the Mountbatten family, 4th quarter Edinburgh).

Plans for the funeral, which occurred on 17 April, a Saturday, included the Duke's coffin being carried by the Grenadier Guards to the State Entrance of Windsor Castle before being taken to the West Steps of St George's Chapel at 2:45 pm on a custom-built Land Rover Defender hearse in Edinburgh green that the Duke helped to design. The Quadrangle, the point from which the coffin departed, was lined by the Household Cavalry, the Foot Guards, as well as military detachments from units with special links to the Duke. Defence advisors from Australia, Canada, New Zealand, and Trinidad and Tobago were also present, representing the Duke's links to units in their respective countries. The coffin was draped with his personal standard, carried his naval cap and his sword, and had a wreath of white roses and lilies placed on it with a note written by the Queen. The band of the Grenadier Guards led the procession from the Quadrangle to Horseshoe Cloister, followed by military commanders and chiefs of staff.

Behind the coffin walked the Duke's four children, three of his grandchildren (Prince William, Duke of Cambridge; Prince Harry, Duke of Sussex; and Peter Phillips), his nephew by marriage David Armstrong-Jones, 2nd Earl of Snowdon, his son-in-law Sir Timothy Laurence, and his household staff (including Brigadier Archie Miller-Bakewell). They were followed by the Queen, who was travelling in the Bentley State Limousine, accompanied by Lady Susan Hussey, her lady-in-waiting. Personnel from the Royal Navy, the Royal Marines, The Highlanders, 4th Battalion, Royal Regiment of Scotland and the Royal Air Force lined the procession route. The King's Troop, Royal Horse Artillery fired minute guns throughout the procession. The Duke's favourite driving carriage, accompanied by some of his grooms and pulled by his two black Fell ponies, Balmoral Nevis and Notlaw Storm, stood in the Quadrangle as the procession passed by. On the driver's seat of the carriage were laid the Duke's cap, whip and driving gloves.

At the West Steps of the chapel, which were lined by the Household Cavalry, eight pallbearers from the Royal Marines carried the coffin. A guard of honour was formed from members of the Rifles, while the Band and Bugles of The Rifles played the national anthem and the Royal Navy pipers piped the side at 2:53 pm, followed by a national minute's silence at 3 pm. Around 730 members of the Armed Forces were present at Windsor Castle, including four military bands.

David Conner, Dean of Windsor, and Justin Welby, Archbishop of Canterbury, officiated at the funeral service. The Duke's insignia was displayed on cushions on the altar in St George's Chapel, including honours and decorations bestowed by the United Kingdom, Canada, Australia, New Zealand, and Papua New Guinea, as well as other member-states of the Commonwealth; his field marshal's baton and Royal Air Force wings; and insignia of the Danish Order of the Elephant and the Greek Order of the Redeemer. During the service, there was a reduced choir of four singers conducted by the chapel director of music James Vivian; the organist was Luke Bond. The four singers were the soprano Miriam Allan and three lay clerks (Tom Liliburn, Nick Madden and Simon Whiteley).

No sermons or eulogies were delivered at the service at the Duke's wish. The ceremony highlighted his links to the Royal Navy and his passion for the sea. The royal family confirmed that for the memorial, the Duke had handpicked all the music himself. His choices were "imbued with his long, proud legacy with the Royal Navy, and a deep love of Britain's musical heritage."

The funeral started with the choir singing the Funeral Sentences, composed by William Croft. The first lesson, from Ecclesiasticus, chapter 43, verses 11–26, was read by the Dean of Windsor. The second lesson, from the Gospel of John, chapter 11, verses 21–27, was read by the Archbishop of Canterbury. Psalm 104 was sung to a setting by William Lovelady that the Duke had commissioned. During the service, Britten's setting of Psalm 100 was sung by the choir at the request of the Duke of Edinburgh himself. The music included the hymn "Eternal Father, Strong to Save", which is traditionally associated with seafarers, Benjamin Britten's Jubilate in C (also commissioned by the Duke), and the Russian Kontakion of the Departed to an arrangement by Sir Walter Parratt. The music performance entailed meticulous planning of keys, built around G minor and G major; other connecting royal, historical and local themes were also included in the music for the service. The Dean of Windsor paid tribute to the Duke's "unwavering loyalty" to the Queen and "his service to the nation and the Commonwealth" in the bidding. The Dean gave the commendation as the coffin was lowered into the Royal Vault, while the pipe major of the 4th Battalion of the Royal Regiment of Scotland played the lament "The Flooers o the Forest" while walking from the North Quire Aisle to the Dean's Cloister. The service finished with the proclamation of the Duke's styles and titles by Thomas Woodcock, Garter Principal King of Arms, and the bugle calls "Last Post" (sounded by the Buglers of the Royal Marines), "Reveille" (sounded by the State Trumpeters of the Household Cavalry) and "Action Stations" (sounded by the Buglers of the Royal Marines). The Archbishop of Canterbury pronounced the blessing, which was followed by "God Save the Queen". After the service Bond played Johann Sebastian Bach's Prelude and Fugue in C minor, BWV 546.

The Duke's remains were temporarily held in the Royal Vault at St George's Chapel. Following the death of Elizabeth II, his remains were moved to the King George VI Memorial Chapel inside St George's, where they were buried next to each other.

=== Attenders ===
Attender	Relation to Prince Philip
The Queen	Widow
The Prince of Wales and The Duchess of Cornwall	Son and daughter-in-law
The Duke and Duchess of Cambridge	Grandson and granddaughter-in-law
The Duke of Sussex	Grandson
The Princess Royal and Vice Admiral Sir Timothy Laurence	Daughter and son-in-law
Peter Phillips	Grandson
Zara and Michael Tindall	Granddaughter and grandson-in-law
The Duke of York	Son
Princess Beatrice and Edoardo Mapelli Mozzi	Granddaughter and grandson-in-law
Princess Eugenie and Jack Brooksbank	Granddaughter and grandson-in-law
The Earl and Countess of Wessex and Forfar	Son and daughter-in-law
Lady Louise Mountbatten-Windsor	Granddaughter
Viscount Severn	Grandson
The Duke of Gloucester	Second cousin once removed
The Duke of Kent	First cousin once removed
Princess Alexandra, The Hon. Lady Ogilvy	First cousin once removed
The Earl of Snowdon	Nephew
Lady Sarah and Daniel Chatto	Niece and nephew-in-law
The Prince of Hohenlohe-Langenburg	Great-nephew
The Hereditary Prince of Baden	Great-nephew
The Landgrave of Hesse	Third cousin once removed
The Countess Mountbatten of Burma	First cousin once removed-in-law

Regulations against mass gatherings brought in because of the COVID-19 pandemic meant that the number of guests attending the funeral was limited to thirty. This limit did not include anyone working at the funeral, such as pallbearers and clergy. As a result, only members of the royal family and a limited number of relatives attended the ceremony inside the chapel. The Queen sat alone at the service. Per COVID-19 regulations, households were separated by two metres. All attendees were required to wear masks and not sing.

The funeral departed from royal protocol with all family members attending in formal day dress rather than military uniforms, something which also occurred at the funerals of Diana, Princess of Wales, and Princess Margaret, Countess of Snowdon, though protocol was followed for the funeral of the Queen Mother.

Prince Harry, who was then living in the United States, had planned to return to the UK for the Duke's 100th birthday in June and the unveiling of a statue of his mother in July. He instead returned six days prior to the funeral. He would have been joined by his wife, Meghan, Duchess of Sussex, but she did not receive medical clearance from her doctor for making the trip due to her pregnancy. To comply with COVID-19 regulations for travel into the UK, Prince Harry had to quarantine for at least five days upon his arrival in the UK; there was an existing exemption in law which allowed for mourners from abroad to temporarily leave quarantine to attend a funeral.

Other attendees included Prince Philipp of Hohenlohe-Langenburg (grandson of the Duke's sister Princess Margarita), Hereditary Prince Bernhard of Baden (grandson of the Duke's sister Princess Theodora), and Landgrave Donatus of Hesse (grand-nephew of the Duke's sister Princess Sophie). The Duke had requested that members of his German family, who were prevented from attending his wedding, be allowed to attend his funeral; the group travelled to the UK on the weekend following his death and quarantined in Ascot, Berkshire.

The British prime minister, Boris Johnson, said he would not attend the funeral so as to allow as many members of the Duke's family as possible to attend.

=== Security ===
Thames Valley Police started deploying officers on 13 April to search Windsor ahead of the funeral service. Security measures in the area were heightened, as police presence in the area also increased, with police forces checking vehicles around the town using the automatic number-plate recognition system.

== Reactions ==
=== Royal family ===
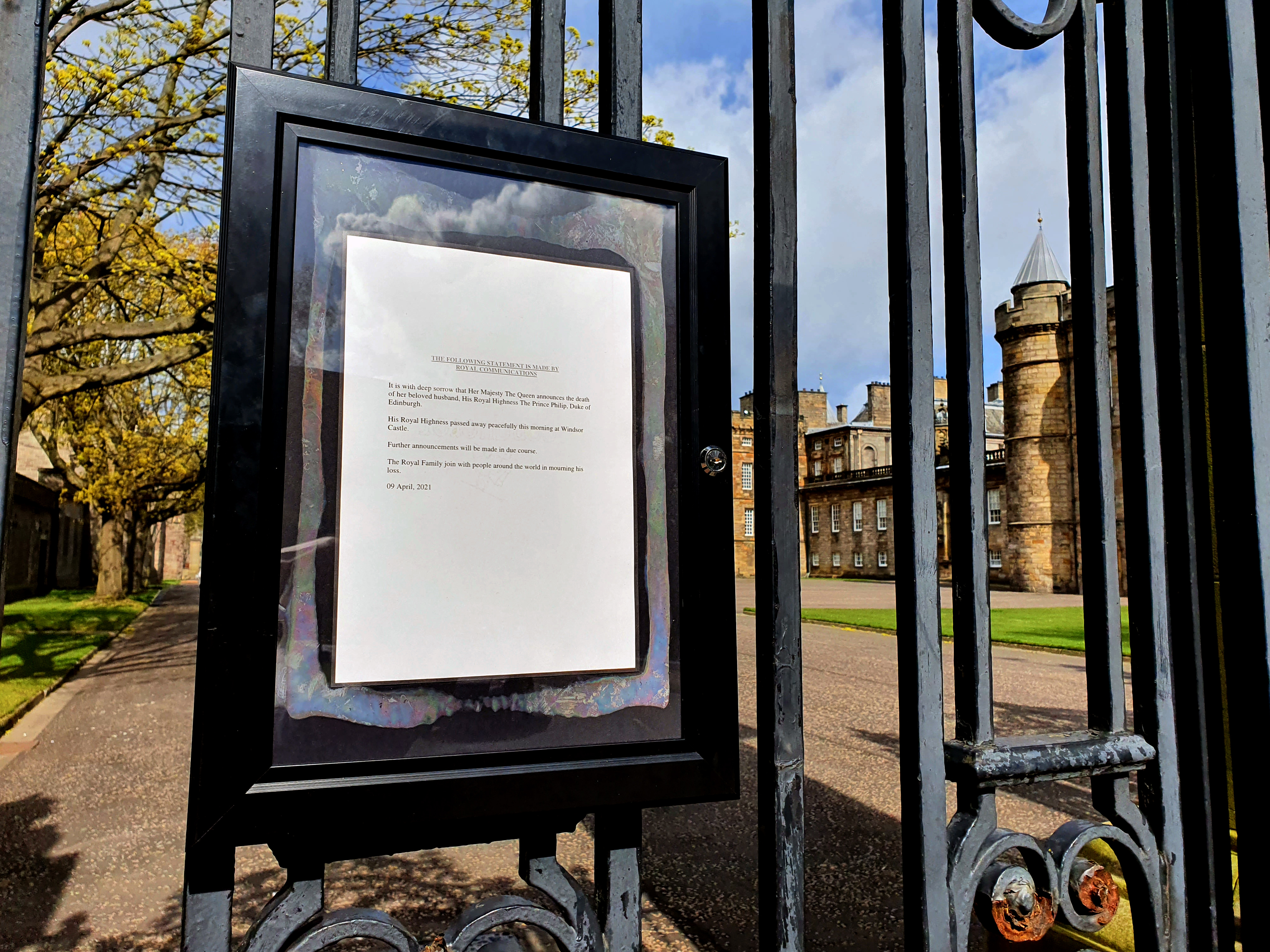
An official notice announcing the death of the Duke of Edinburgh posted outside the Palace of Holyroodhouse in Edinburgh

In private, the Queen said her husband's death had "left a huge void in her life". The Duke's children paid tribute to him in interviews recorded for broadcast after his death. Prince Charles also made a televised short statement from Highgrove House, describing his father as a "much loved and appreciated figure" who had "given the most remarkable, devoted service to the Queen, to my family and to the country, but also to the whole of the Commonwealth". In accordance with the Queen's wishes, the royal family and the royal households observed two weeks of mourning starting on 9 April.

The Queen's immediate family travelled to Windsor to support her, and several family members attended a memorial service at the Royal Chapel of All Saints on 11 April.

As Prince Philip was the first president of the British Academy of Film and Television Arts, the 74th British Academy Film Awards ceremonies on 10–11 April began with tributes to him. Prince William, the current president, pulled out from public engagements due to his grandfather's death.

Philip's grandchildren William, Harry, and Eugenie and grandson-in-law Mike Tindall released statements in which they paid tribute to him. The following day, Prince Edward also remarked that messages from the public were "uplifting" and said that the Duke's "spirit and ethos lives on through his Award, through each and every life touched."

On 21 April 2021, on the occasion of her 95th birthday, the Queen expressed gratitude for the warm wishes she received, and also added that the royal family, while in mourning, had been comforted to see and to hear "the tributes paid to [Prince Philip], from people within the United Kingdom, the Commonwealth and around the world". She added she was deeply touched and thanked the public for their "support and kindness shown to us in recent days".

=== Commonwealth ===
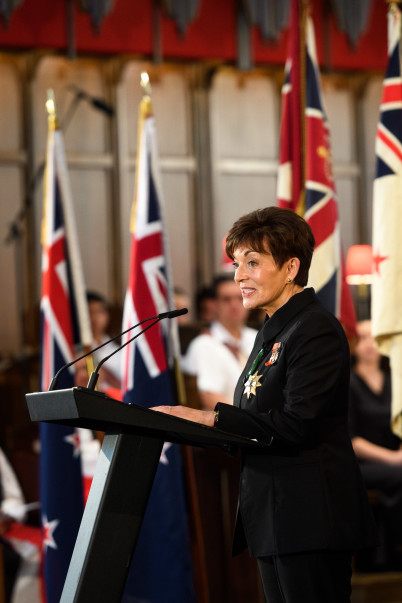
Dame Patsy Reddy, the Governor General of New Zealand, speaking at the state memorial service, 21 April 2021

Philip was a prominent figure in the Commonwealth of Nations and, particularly, the Commonwealth realms. Representatives of the governments and official oppositions of many of those countries shared messages of condolence to Queen Elizabeth II and in mourning him for their people. Many noted Philip's support and patronage of organisations throughout the Commonwealth, most prominently for The Duke of Edinburgh's Award programme. (Note: Antigua and Barbuda; Australia; The Bahamas; Bangladesh; Barbados; Belize; Botswana; Cameroon; Canada; Cyprus; Eswatini; Fiji; Ghana; Grenada; Guyana; India; Jamaica; Kenya; Malawi; Malaysia; the Maldives; Malta; Mauritius; New Zealand; Nigeria; Pakistan; Papua New Guinea; Rwanda; Saint Kitts and Nevis; Saint Lucia; Saint Vincent and the Grenadines; Seychelles; Singapore; South Africa; Sri Lanka; Tanzania; Tonga; Trinidad and Tobago; and Zambia.) The Commonwealth Secretary-General, Baroness Scotland, also paid tribute and offered condolences, as did the Commonwealth Games Federation, of which Philip had been president.

Flags were flown at half-mast across the Commonwealth. The governments of The Bahamas, Canada, and the Solomon Islands issued notices to fly the national flag at half-mast from the announcement of the death to after the funeral and burial. Notices to fly the national flag at half-mast on specific days during the mourning period were also issued by the governments of Australia, Belize, New Zealand, Saint Lucia, and Saint Kitts and Nevis. (Note: The Australian flag was flown at half-mast on 10 and 17 April. In Belize, the governor-general ordered all national flags to fly at half-mast and church bells rung on 17 April. In New Zealand, flags on government and naval buildings were ordered at half-mast on 10 April 13 April, 17 April, and on 21 April, the day of the memorial service in New Zealand. In Saint Lucia, the government announced the flag would be flown at half-mast on 9 April. In Saint Kitts and Nevis, government buildings and facilities were instructed to fly all flags at half-mast on 17 April.) In Antigua and Barbuda the flag of the governor-general was flown at half-mast until the day of the funeral. Gun salutes were also fired across the Commonwealth.

Physical books of condolences were also opened to the public in some Commonwealth realms; including Government House in Antigua and Barbuda, the Beehive and Tūranga in New Zealand, and Government House in the Solomon Islands. However, physical books of condolences were not opened in Australia, Canada and Jamaica due to the COVID-19 pandemic.

==== United Kingdom ====
The prime minister, former prime ministers, the leader of the opposition, and the first ministers expressed condolences. The House of Commons was recalled a day early after its Easter break, on 12 April, to allow MPs to pay tribute. The House of Lords was already due to sit on that day. The Scottish Parliament, the Welsh Parliament and the Northern Ireland Assembly members also paid their tributes at meetings on the same day. Local election campaigns were also suspended. They resumed after the House of Commons members paid their tributes before pausing again on the day of the funeral.

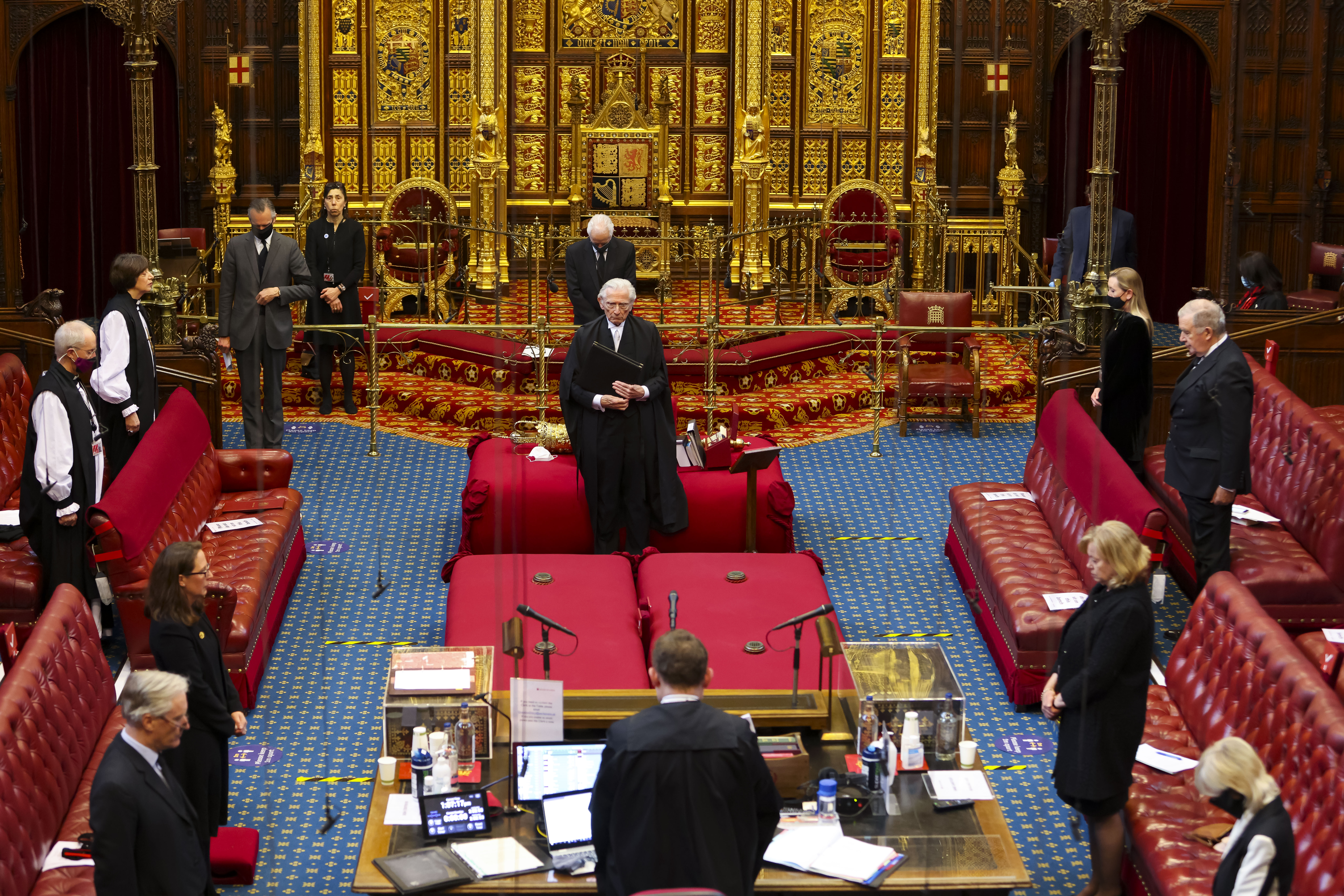
Members of the House of Lords observing a minute's silence before tributes to the Duke on 12 April

Gun salutes were fired across the UK, in Gibraltar, and on warships, including HMS Diamond and HMS Montrose, at sea. Sporting bodies modified their programmes as a mark of respect. On 11 April a service of remembrance was held at Canterbury Cathedral by Archbishop Justin Welby. Similar services were held across the UK.

Alderman Bill Keery, a Democratic Unionist Party councillor, was suspended from the party after making reference to "grooming" when speaking about the first meeting between the Duke and the Queen when she was 13.

In May 2021 Royal Mail honoured Philip by issuing four black-and-white stamps depicting him at various stages of his life. The following month HM Treasury unveiled a new special limited-edition £5 coin bearing Philip's portrait on Armed Forces Day; the design was approved by the Duke in 2008. The exhibition "Prince Philip: A Celebration" at Windsor Castle and a complementary exhibition at the Palace of Holyroodhouse went on display in June and July respectively to mark what would have been Philip's 100th birthday.

Following the Duke's death, the Rutland Lieutenancy announced plans for creating the Duke of Edinburgh Memorial Orchard at the Rutland Showground in tribute to Philip's environmental activism. Its final tree was planted by his cousin Prince Richard in November 2021 and a bas relief of Philip was unveiled on the same day.

===== Public =====
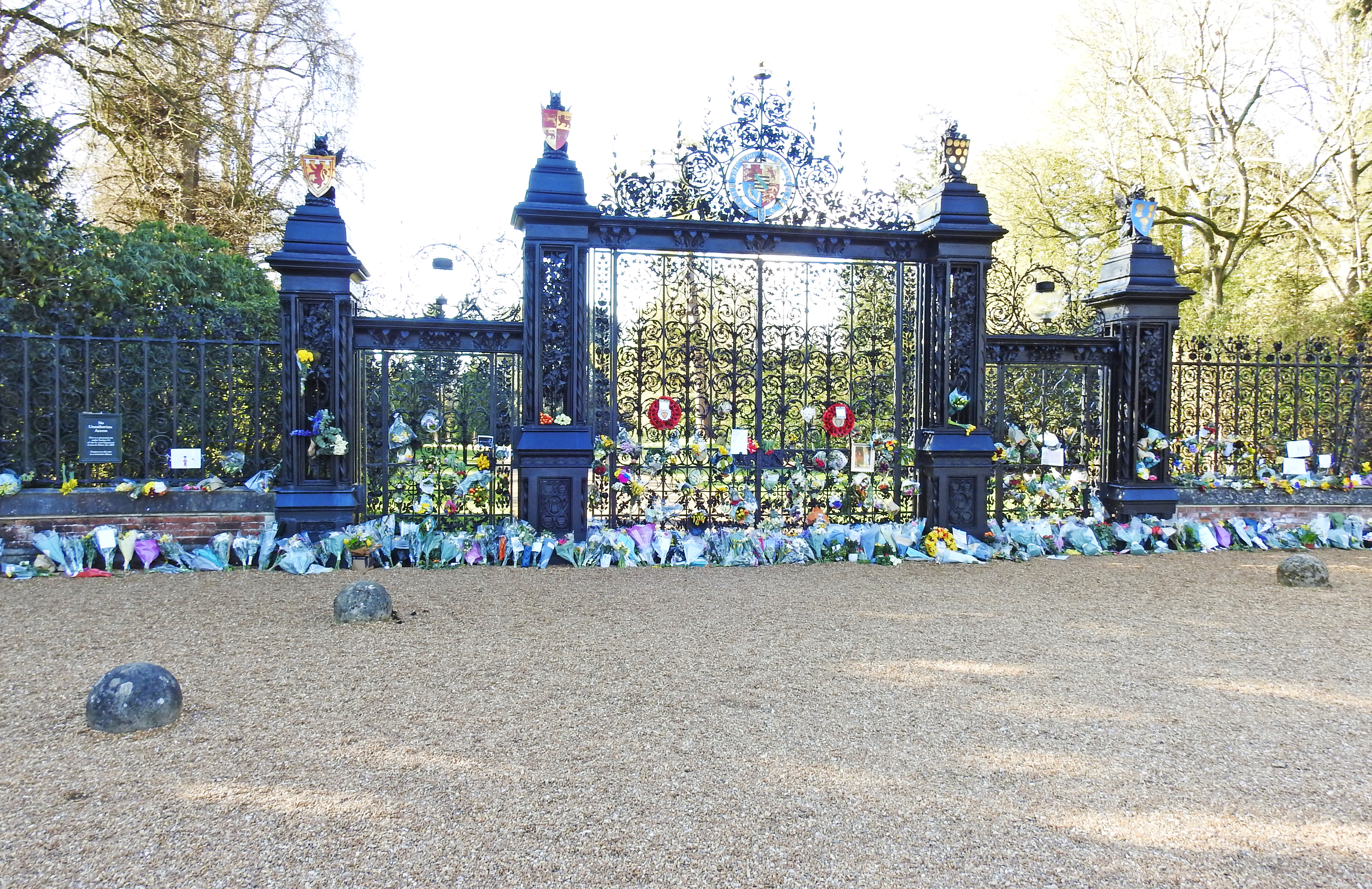
Floral tributes to Prince Philip outside the gates of Sandringham House, Norfolk

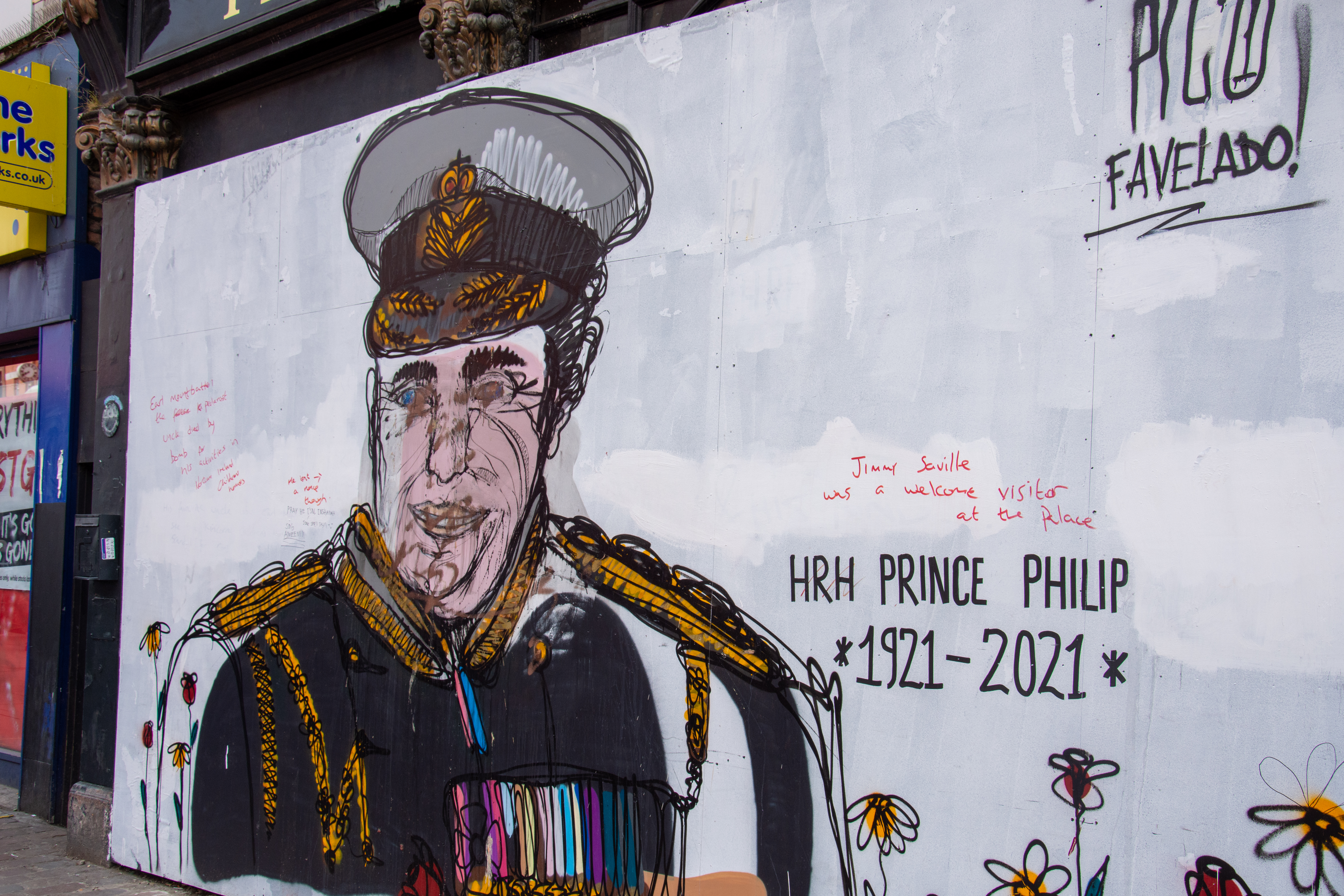
Graffiti tribute to Prince Philip in Camden, London; another person has added a note attacking the relationship between Jimmy Savile and the royal family.

Due to restrictions during the COVID-19 pandemic, members of the public were advised not to leave flowers, and a notice marking the Duke's death outside Buckingham Palace was removed to avoid crowds forming around it. Despite this, over a hundred floral and card tributes were placed at the Palace gates, and thousands gathered to pay their respects. An elegy was published by the British Poet Laureate, Simon Armitage, to mark the Duke's death.

The heavy coverage of the death, particularly by the BBC, received some public criticism. On 15 April it was announced that the BBC received 109,741 complaints about their handling of the Duke's death, the majority of which was reported to be criticism that the coverage was excessive. As a result, the BBC's coverage of the Duke's death has been the most-widely-complained-about programming in its history.

===== Crown Dependencies =====
The lieutenant governor of the Isle of Man, Sir Richard Gozney, sent condolences to the Queen, and tribute was made by the island's chief minister, Howard Quayle. Flags on all public buildings on the island were being flown at half-mast. Members of Tynwald paid their tributes on 15 April. In Jersey flags were flown at half-mast. The chief minister of Jersey, the bailiff of Jersey, and the lieutenant governor of Jersey all paid tribute. Representatives of Guernsey also remembered the Duke warmly, and on 10 April a 41-gun salute was sounded from Castle Cornet. Representatives of Alderney paid their tributes on 14 April.

===== Overseas Territories =====
Gun salutes were sounded in the territories of Anguilla, Bermuda, British Virgin Islands, Cayman Islands, Falkland Islands, Gibraltar, Montserrat, and Turks and Caicos Islands. The flag at Rothera Research Station, British Antarctic Territory, was lowered to half-mast. Philip Rushbrook, Governor of Saint Helena, Ascension and Tristan da Cunha, gave a eulogy during a remembrance service. The Governor of Pitcairn, Laura Clarke, attended the New Zealand memorial service.

==== Canada ====
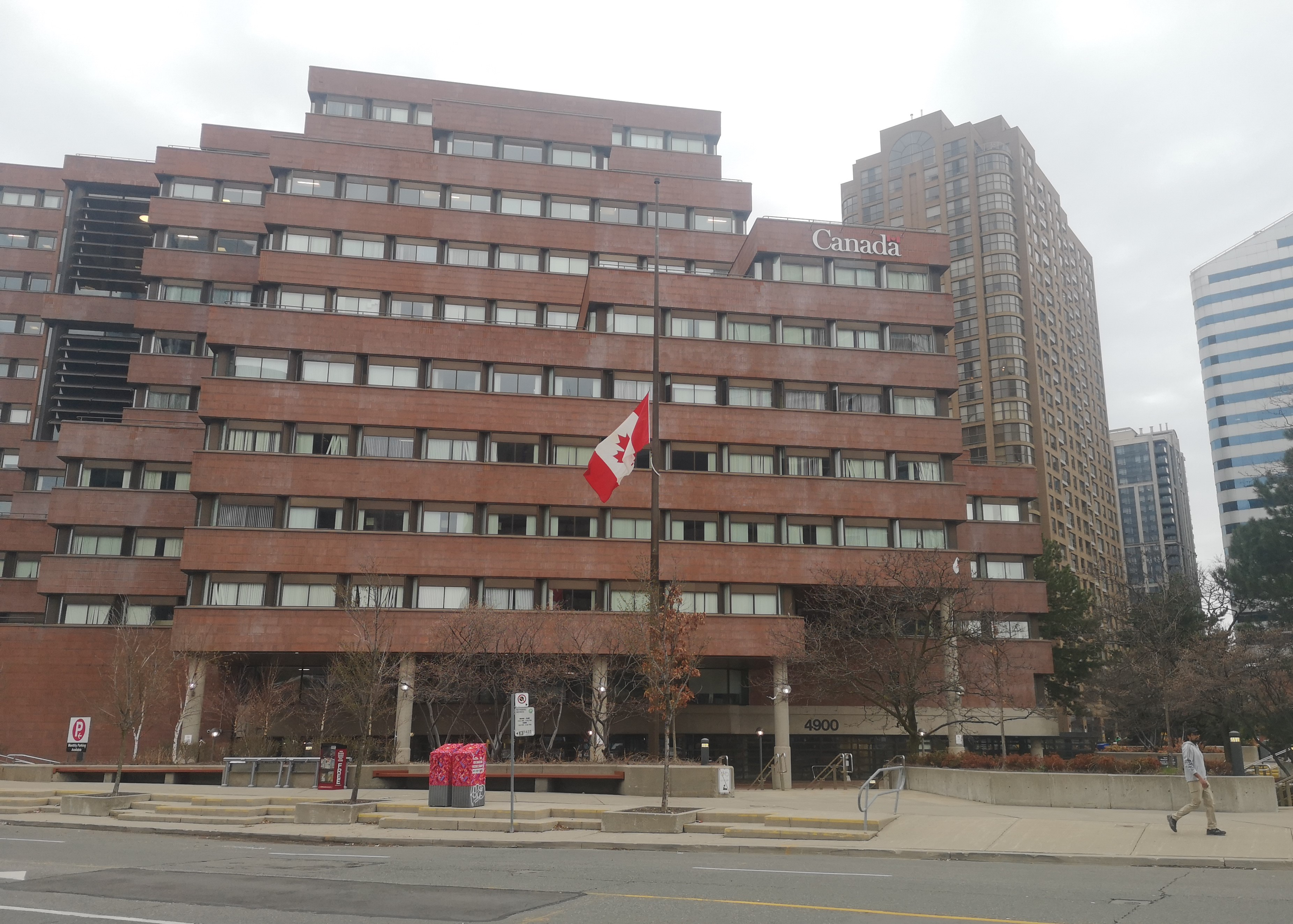
The Canadian flag flying at half-mast outside the Joseph Shepard Building, Toronto, on 11 April

On the morning of 9 April, local time, the bourdon of the Peace Tower in the national capital, Ottawa, was rung 99 times, one for each year the Duke lived, and the federal Crown-in-Council ordered all properties owned by the Crown to fly flags at half-mast until the afternoon following the Duke's funeral. While the gates of the monarch's and viceroy's official residence in Ottawa, Rideau Hall, remained open, the Office of the Secretary to the Governor General of Canada, in light of COVID-19-related restrictions, encouraged mourners to visit a commemorative website set up by the Ministry of Canadian Heritage. A parliamentary motion was passed in the Canadian House of Commons, on 12 April, to express its condolences. The federal government announced five days later that it would donate CA$200,000 to the Canadian branch of the Duke of Edinburgh's Award, as a tribute to the Duke.

A national day of mourning was proclaimed in Canada on 17 April, with a televised national ceremony taking place at Christ Church Cathedral, Ottawa, after the funeral concluded in the UK. It was televised and live-streamed by the Canadian Broadcasting Corporation and Radio-Canada. Due to COVID-19 restrictions, no guests were allowed to attend the service, with tributes provided virtually, including ones from David Johnston, a former governor general of Canada, (Note: There was not a sitting governor general at the time, as the ceremony took place between the resignation of Julie Payette in January and the installation of Mary Simon in July.) Prime Minister Justin Trudeau, and Algonquin Spiritual Advisor Albert Dumont.

His Royal Highness, Prince Philip, Duke of Edinburgh, was courteous, down-to-earth loyal and enthusiastic in all aspects of his life. He was driven by a certainty that people could be inspired to rise to their potential if guided and supported. He was the model of the servant leader, one who puts the needs of others first, enabling them to develop and perform their duties better.

— David Johnston, Former Governor General of Canada

External videos
- National commemorative ceremony in honour of His Royal Highness The Duke of Edinburgh

Shane AD Parker, Bishop of the Anglican Diocese of Ottawa, and Elizabeth J Bretzlaff, Dean of Ottawa and Rector of Christ Church Cathedral, officiated in the ceremony, which began with Andrew McAnerney (tenor) and Stephanie Manias (soprano), accompanied by organist James Calkiin, performing, in the cathedral, the "Kontakion of the Faithful Departed", adapted by Canadian composer Stephanie Martin into a choral setting. The reading was from the Book of Ecclesiasticus, by Sailor First Class Roselyne Marie-Andrée Rhéaume, of the Royal Canadian Navy, followed by the recitation of Psalm 139.1–11, then prayers offered by the interfaith community, given by Major-General Guy JJ Chapdelaine, Chaplain General of the Canadian Armed Forces and Honorary Chaplain to the Queen. Following the reading of the Lord's Prayer and the first address, the Appleby College String Ensemble performed "Amazing Grace". The second address was delivered and then the second musical interlude, the Royal 22e Regiment Band playing the original work by RCN Petty Officer Nadia Pona (Retired), "His Royal Service Ends", which employed contrasting themes and orchestrations "to emphasise the Duke of Edinburgh's life and career" and "symbilic references to 'Heart of Oak'". During this performance, a video retrospective of the Duke's life was shown. A moment of silence then preceded the reading of the Prayer of Commendation and sining of the hymn "I Vow to Thee my Country". The service was closed by the blessing from the Bishop and the performances of the royal anthem, "God Save the Queen"; the national anthem, "O Canada"; and "Prelude", by the Canadian composer Samuel P Warren.

A 41-gun salute was fired outside the grounds of Rideau Hall, by The Cameron Highlanders of Ottawa (Duke of Edinburgh's Own), and a recital by the Dominion Carillonneur on the Peace Tower carillon followed the national ceremony.

Memorial services in Halifax, Nova Scotia, and Toronto, Ontario, were also broadcast online, with the former service featuring a eulogy by Lieutenant Governor Arthur LeBlanc.

==== Australia ====
A 41-gun salute was observed outside Parliament House in Australia on the afternoon of 10 April. A small church service was held in St Andrew's Cathedral, Sydney, on 11 April, for Australian officials to pay respect to the Duke. Another memorial service led by Archbishop Geoffrey Smith was held at St. Peter's Cathedral, Adelaide on 18 April, and was attended by South Australian dignitaries.

==== New Zealand ====
A 41-gun salute was observed in New Zealand from Point Jerningham at noon on 11 April. On 13 April, MPs in New Zealand convened to pay tribute to him, including performing a waiata.

A state memorial service was also held at Wellington Cathedral of St. Paul on 21 April, led by Archbishop Philip Richardson. Speakers during the service included Prime Minister Jacinda Ardern and Governor-General Dame Patsy Reddy. The current and former governors-general, prime ministers, parliamentarians, and the high commissioners from Australia and the United Kingdom attended the congregation.

==== Cyprus ====
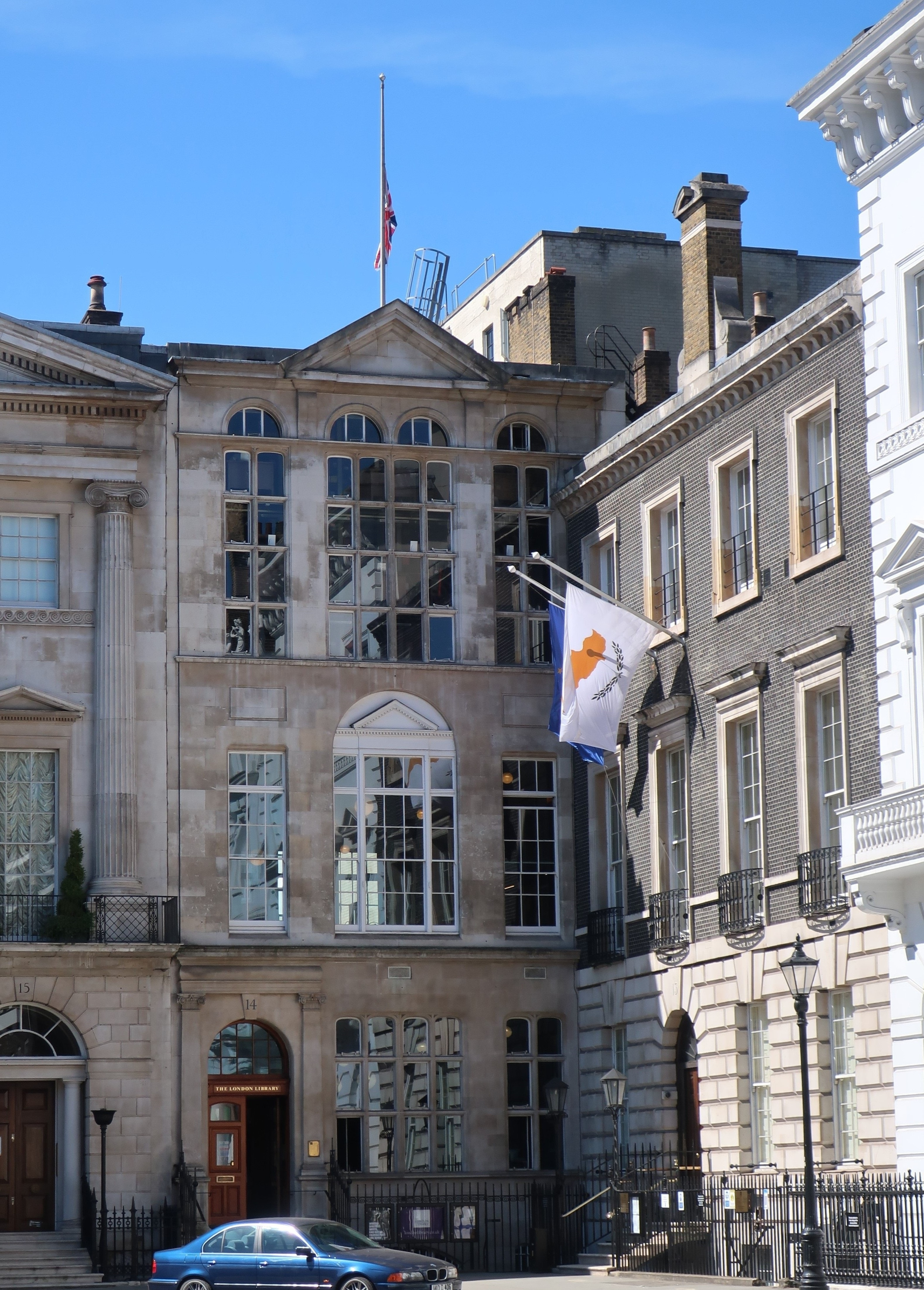
The High Commission of Cyprus in London flew the flags of Cyprus and the European Union at half-mast on the day of the funeral

In Cyprus, where Philip spent a decade as a Royal Navy officer, churches were encouraged to hold a commemorative service before the funeral. A Sung Eucharist was conducted on 14 April at St Paul's Anglican Cathedral, Nicosia, in thanksgiving for the Duke's life. It was attended by Archbishop Michael Lewis and British High Commissioner to Cyprus Stephen Lillie.

==== Malta ====
On 17 April a gun salute was held at noon at the Upper Barrakka Saluting Battery overlooking the Grand Harbour in Valletta. The nine-gun salute – one for each decade of the Duke of Edinburgh's life – was organised by the Wirt Artna Foundation and the Malta Tourism Authority. Tributes were also held at Villa Guardamangia in Pietà; a villa where Philip lived while serving in the navy in the late 1940s. The villa was the residence of the royal couple from 1949 to 1951, when Philip was stationed in Malta as the captain of HMS Magpie. The tribute was organised by the Malta George Cross Movement; and saw members of the movement, the Royal Naval Association Malta branch, the Malta Command WW2 Living History Group, and members of the public lay flowers and wreaths at the steps of the villa.

==== Vanuatu ====
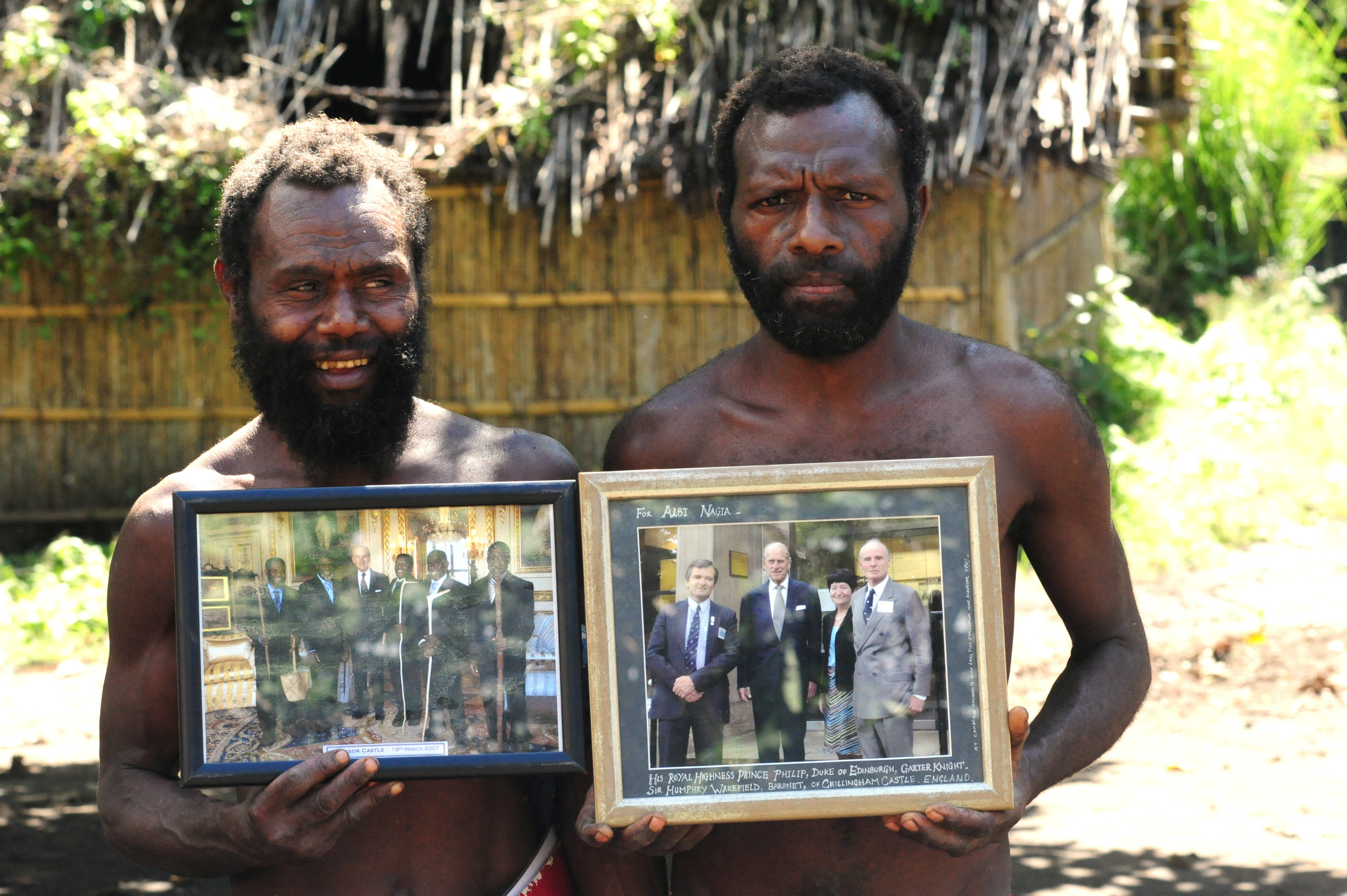
Yaohnanen men in 2012, holding photographs from their meeting with the Duke in 2007

The Kastom people around the villages of Yaohnanen and Yakel on the southern island of Tanna in Vanuatu, who worship Prince Philip, mourned his death. The Union Flag was flown at half mast on the grounds of the nakamal. A formal weeks-long mourning period was declared and many tribespeople gathered on 12 April in a ceremony to remember Philip. During their mourning period, villagers met periodically to conduct rites and display memorabilia, yams and kava plants. Many of the tribesmen believe that while his body lies at rest, the Duke's soul will return to "its spiritual home, the island of Tanna". Kirk Huffman, an anthropologist familiar with the group, said that after their period of mourning the group would probably transfer their veneration to Prince Charles, who had visited Vanuatu in 2018 and met with some of the tribal leaders.

=== Greece and Denmark ===
As Philip was Greek by birth, the President of Greece, Katerina Sakellaropoulou, shared a photograph of him as a young boy dressed in the uniform of an Evzone guard. The photograph had been presented to the nation by Prince Charles on a visit to Athens in March 2021. Constantine II, Philip's first cousin once removed and the last king of the Hellenes, praised Philip's dedication to his country and the Commonwealth. While the funeral was held at Windsor, Philip was honoured with a memorial prayer in Saint Spyridon Church in Corfu by the metropolitan of Corfu, Paxos and Diapontia, Nektarios.

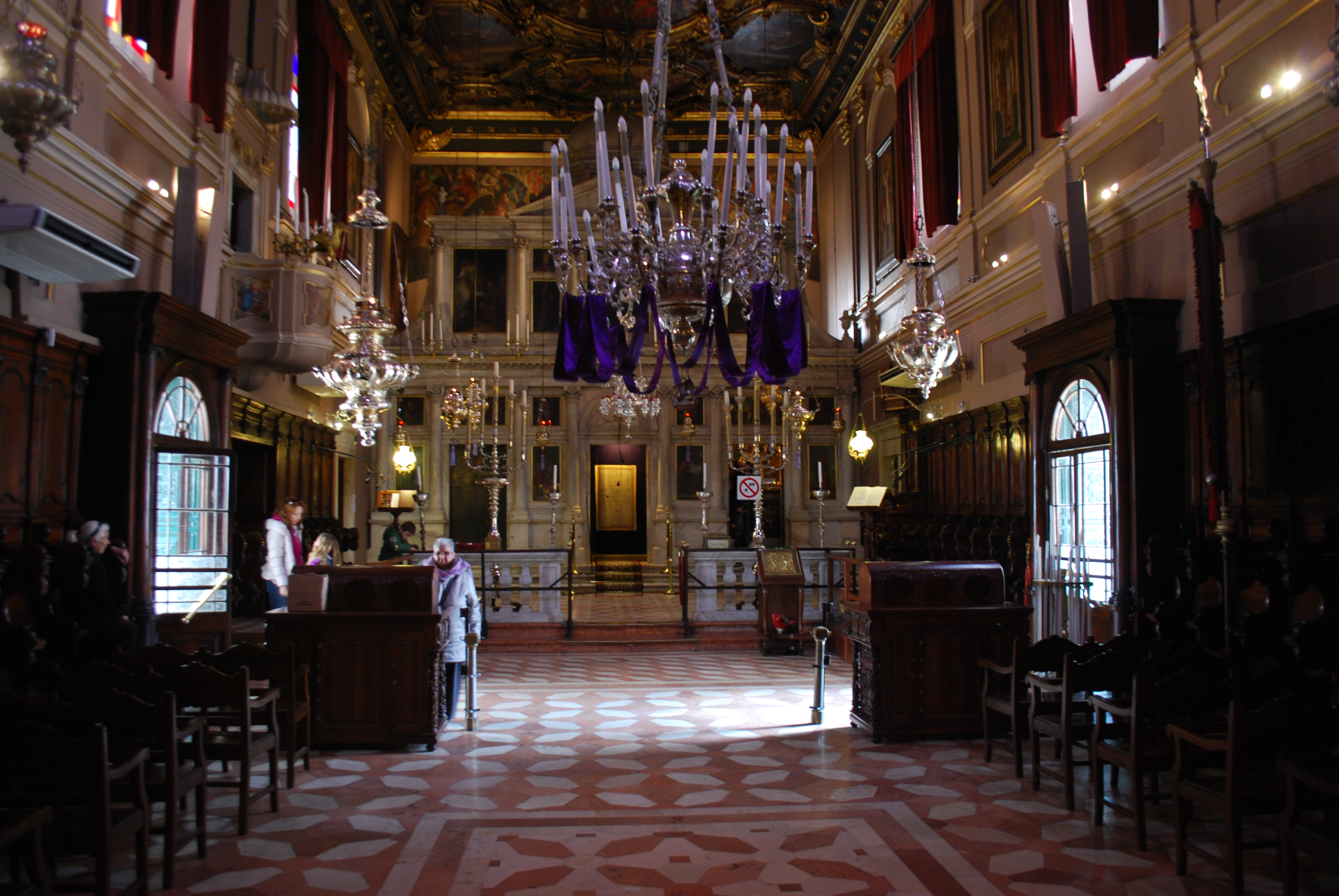
The Saint Spyridon Church in Corfu where a memorial prayer took place for the Duke on the day of his funeral

From Denmark, a nation of which Philip was also born a prince, Queen Margrethe II sent condolences to Queen Elizabeth II. The Danish Royal House shared a portrait in which Philip was wearing the Danish Order of the Elephant. The flags over Margrethe's official residence at Amalienborg in Copenhagen were flown at half-mast, by her orders, for the funeral on 17 April.

=== Royalty ===
Various heads of existing and former European monarchies, most of whom were related to the Duke (predominantly through Victoria of the United Kingdom and Christian IX of Denmark), shared their grief, including Philippe and Mathilde, the King and Queen of the Belgians; Margrethe II, the Queen of Denmark; Constantine II, the last King of the Hellenes; Henri, the Grand Duke of Luxembourg; Albert II, the Prince of Monaco; Willem-Alexander and Máxima, the King and Queen of the Netherlands, and Princess Beatrix of the Netherlands; Harald V, the King of Norway; Margareta, Custodian of the Crown of Romania; Maria Vladimirovna, Grand Duchess of Russia; Felipe VI and Letizia, the King and Queen of Spain; Carl XVI Gustaf and Silvia, the King and Queen of Sweden; and Alexander and Katherine, the former Crown Prince and Crown Princess of Yugoslavia.

Other monarchs and heads of royal houses from different parts of the world, including native monarchies of Commonwealth nations, also sent their condolences. (Note: Hamad, the King of Bahrain; Jigme Khesar Namgyel Wangchuck and Jetsun Pema, the King and Queen of Bhutan; Luiz, Head of the Imperial House of Brazil; Hassanal Bolkiah and Saleha, the Sultan and Queen of Brunei; Norodom Sihamoni, the King of Cambodia; Mswati III and Ntfombi, the King and Queen Mother of Eswatini; Naruhito and Masako, the Emperor and Empress of Japan; Abdullah II, the King of Jordan; Nawaf, the Emir of Kuwait; Abdullah and Azizah, the Yang di-Pertuan Agong and Raja Permaisuri Agong of Malaysia; Mohammed VI, the King of Morocco; Haitham, the Sultan of Oman; Reza Pahlavi, Head of the House of Pahlavi; Tamim, the Emir of Qatar; Salman and Mohammed, the King and Crown Prince of Saudi Arabia; and Vajiralongkorn, the King of Thailand.)

Flags were flown at half-mast at several royal palaces. The Norwegian Royal House announced that a flag would be flown at half-mast from the balcony of the Royal Palace, Oslo, on 9 April and on the day of the funeral. On the day of the funeral, flags at the Grand Ducal Palace and Berg Castle in Luxembourg, and the Royal Standard of Sweden at Stockholm Palace were also flown at half mast.

==== Bhutan ====
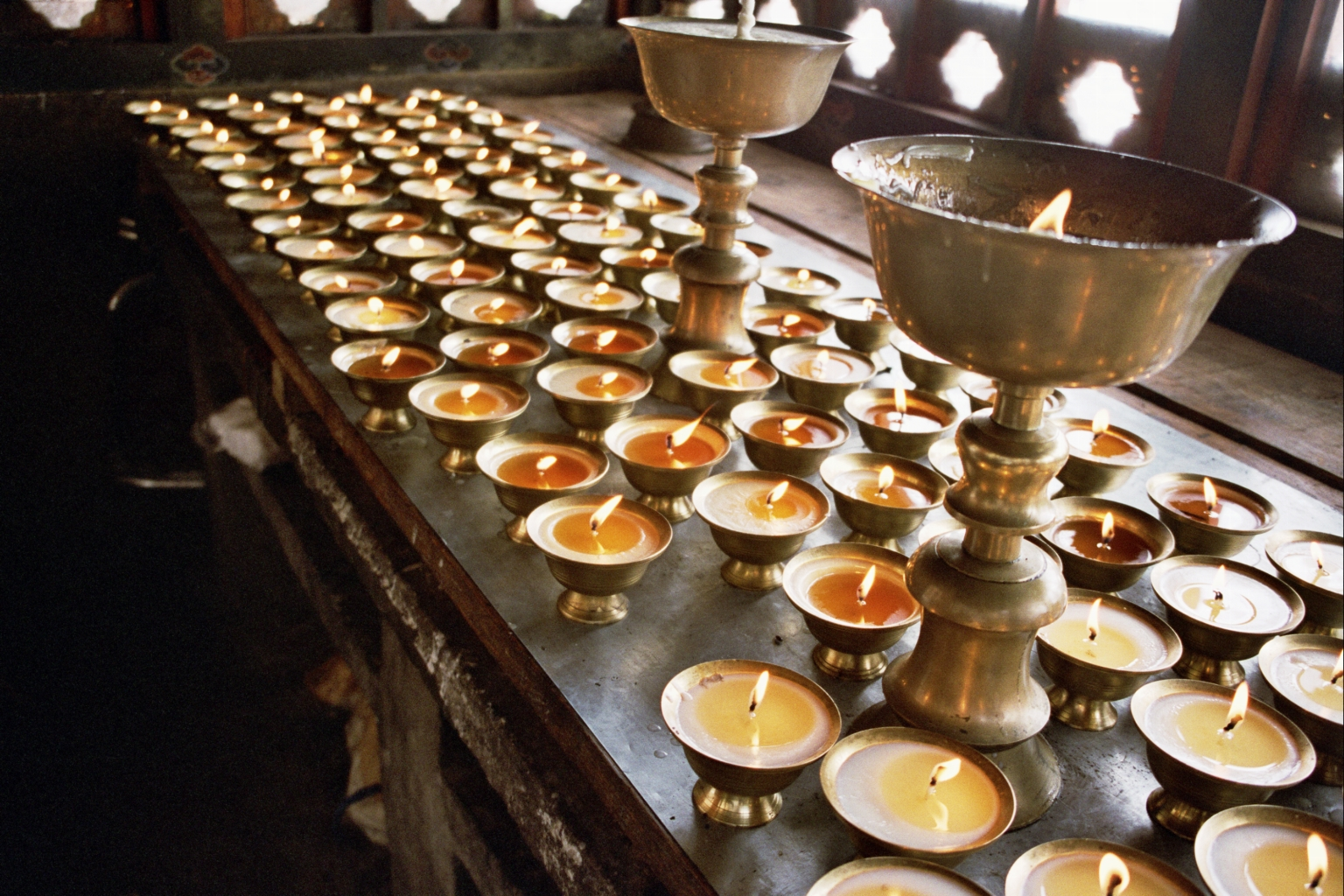
In Tibetan Buddhism, lighting butterlamps for the deceased symbolises the hope that he is free of suffering and his soul will reach enlightenment.

King Jigme Khesar Namgyel Wangchuck and Queen Jetsun Pema of Bhutan gave orders for special prayers to be held in monasteries across the nation in memory of the Duke, for about a week following his death. On 10 April, the King and Queen offered prayers before a portrait of the Duke at the Mongar Dzong, a Buddhist fortress-monastery in Mongar, and lit 1000 butterlamps, which in Tibetan Buddhism symbolises the hope that the person is free of suffering and that his soul will reach enlightenment. They were accompanied by Queen Mother Tshering Yangdon, Prince Gyaltshab Jigme Dorji Wangchuck, and Ashi Yeatso Lhamo.

In Thimphu, Prince Dasho Jigyel Ugyen Wangchuck, accompanied by the Foreign Minister Tandi Dorji, British residents in Bhutan, and Bhutanese who studied in the United Kingdom, also offered prayers and lit 1000 butterlamps at the Simtokha Dzong.

==== Sweden ====
Sweden honoured the Duke, who was a Knight of the Royal Order of the Seraphim, the foremost order of Sweden, on the day of his funeral. The Duke was awarded the order by King Gustaf VI Adolf on 23 June 1954. The Duke was the 683rd Knight of the Order since its inception in 1748.

The Duke's coat of arms as a Knight of the Royal Order of the Seraphim was then taken from the palace to Riddarholmen Church in Stockholm, where the great bell rang a traditional Seraphim Toll (Serafimerringningen) for one hour, from noon to 1 pm. The Vice-Chancellor delivered the eulogy for the deceased Knight of the Order. The Duke's coat of arms were then hung in the church. The Duke's sash and Order of the Seraphim was on display in St George's Chapel on the day of the funeral. The Swedish Royal Family sent wreaths to the British Royal Family.

=== International ===
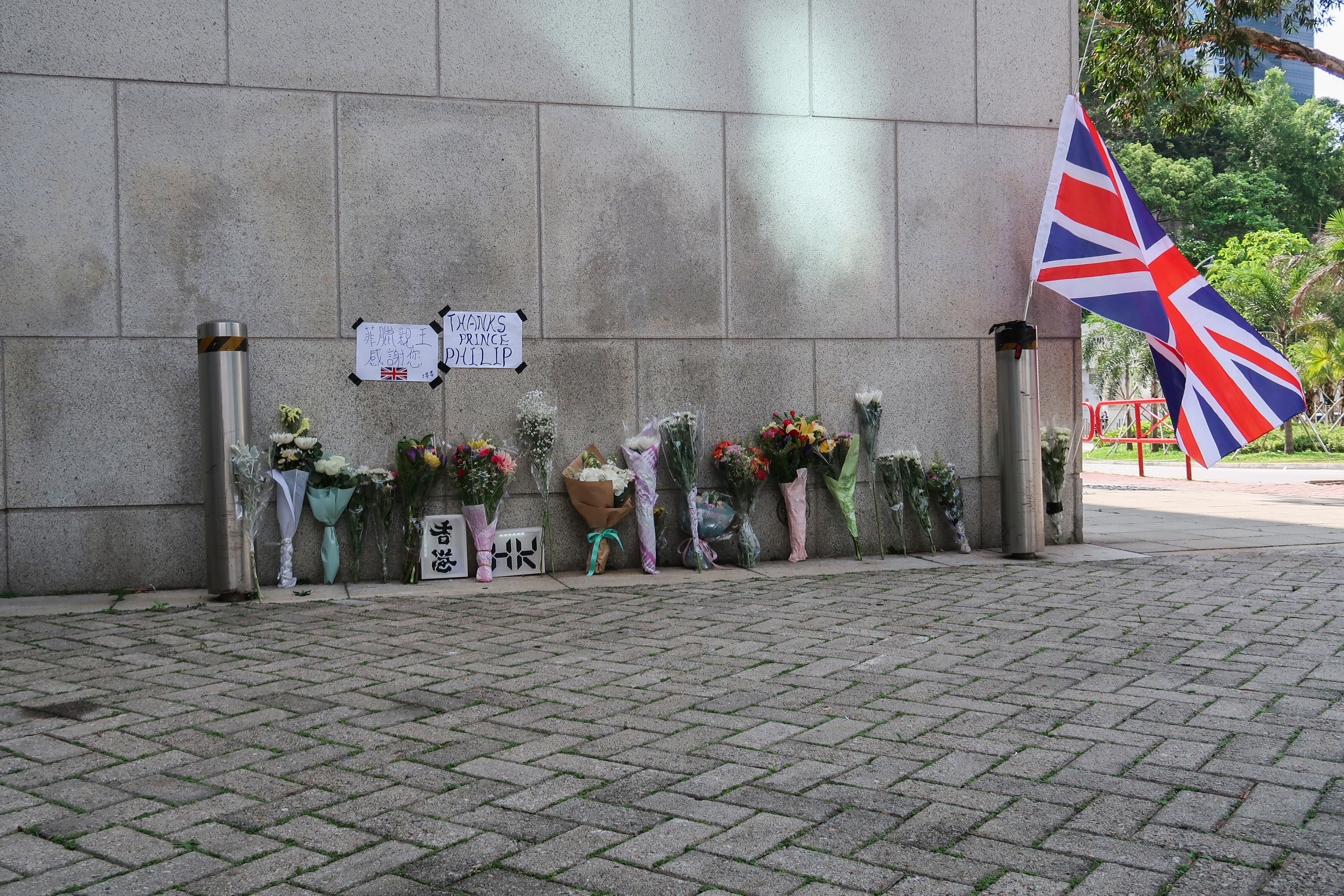
Tributes left to the Duke outside the British Consulate-General, Hong Kong, on 10 April

Past and present representatives of the governments of many nations gave tribute to the life of the Duke and his impact around the world. (Note: Including: Afghanistan; Algeria; Argentina; Armenia; Austria; Azerbaijan; Belarus; Bosnia and Herzegovina; Bulgaria; China; Colombia; Croatia; Cuba; Czech Republic; Egypt; Estonia; Finland; France; Georgia; Germany; Guatemala; the Holy See; Hungary; Iceland; Indonesia; Iraq; Ireland; Israel; Italy; Japan; Kazakhstan; Kyrgyzstan; Lebanon; Lithuania; Mexico; Moldova; Mongolia; the Netherlands; Norway; Palestine; Panama; the Philippines; Poland; Portugal; Romania; Russia; Senegal; Serbia; Slovakia; Slovenia; Somalia; South Korea; Spain; Switzerland; Taiwan; Tajikistan; Thailand; Turkey; Turkmenistan; Ukraine; the United Arab Emirates; the United States; Uzbekistan; Venezuela; Vietnam; and Zimbabwe.) Also sharing sympathy were the president of the European Commission, Ursula von der Leyen, a spokesperson for Secretary-General of the United Nations António Guterres, Director-General of the World Health Organization Tedros Adhanom, Director-General of the World Trade Organization Ngozi Okonjo-Iweala, President of the World Bank David Malpass, Secretary General of NATO Jens Stoltenberg, Pope Francis, and the 14th Dalai Lama, Tenzin Gyatso.

==== Republic of Ireland ====
On the day of the funeral, the Irish National flag at all State buildings in the Republic of Ireland was flown at half-mast as a "mark of respect" for the Duke. Under Ireland's National Flag Guidelines, the flag is flown at half-mast on "all prominent government buildings" with a permanent flag pole on the death of a national or international figure.

The Irish National flag was previously flown at half-mast on all State buildings in 1997, on the day of Diana's funeral, and in 2002, to mark the death of the Queen Mother.

== Media coverage ==
=== News of death ===
At midday, the royal family issued the following statement:

"It is with deep sorrow that Her Majesty The Queen announces the death of her beloved husband, His Royal Highness, Prince Philip, The Duke of Edinburgh.

His Royal Highness passed away peacefully this morning at Windsor Castle.

Further announcements will be made in due course.

The Royal Family join others around the world in mourning his loss."

The BBC suspended all non-children's programming until at least 6 pm on 9 April, and replaced it with respectful programming following the announcement. Viewers watching programmes on other BBC channels or channels such as Gold (which is owned by a commercial subsidiary of the BBC, BBC Studios) were greeted with a black banner reading "Please tune to BBC News for a breaking news story." On the radio, the broadcasts were changed first to the national anthem, and then to sombre music. The BBC's television channels adopted special reports on the Duke's life. On BBC News, the presenter Martine Croxall interrupted the rolling reports to announce the Duke's death. The channel then briefly cut to images of the Duke to allow her to remove her necklace and put on a black cardigan; all BBC channels then assumed the BBC News feed for the report, although BBC Two was already simulcasting the BBC News channel at the time of the announcement.

External videos
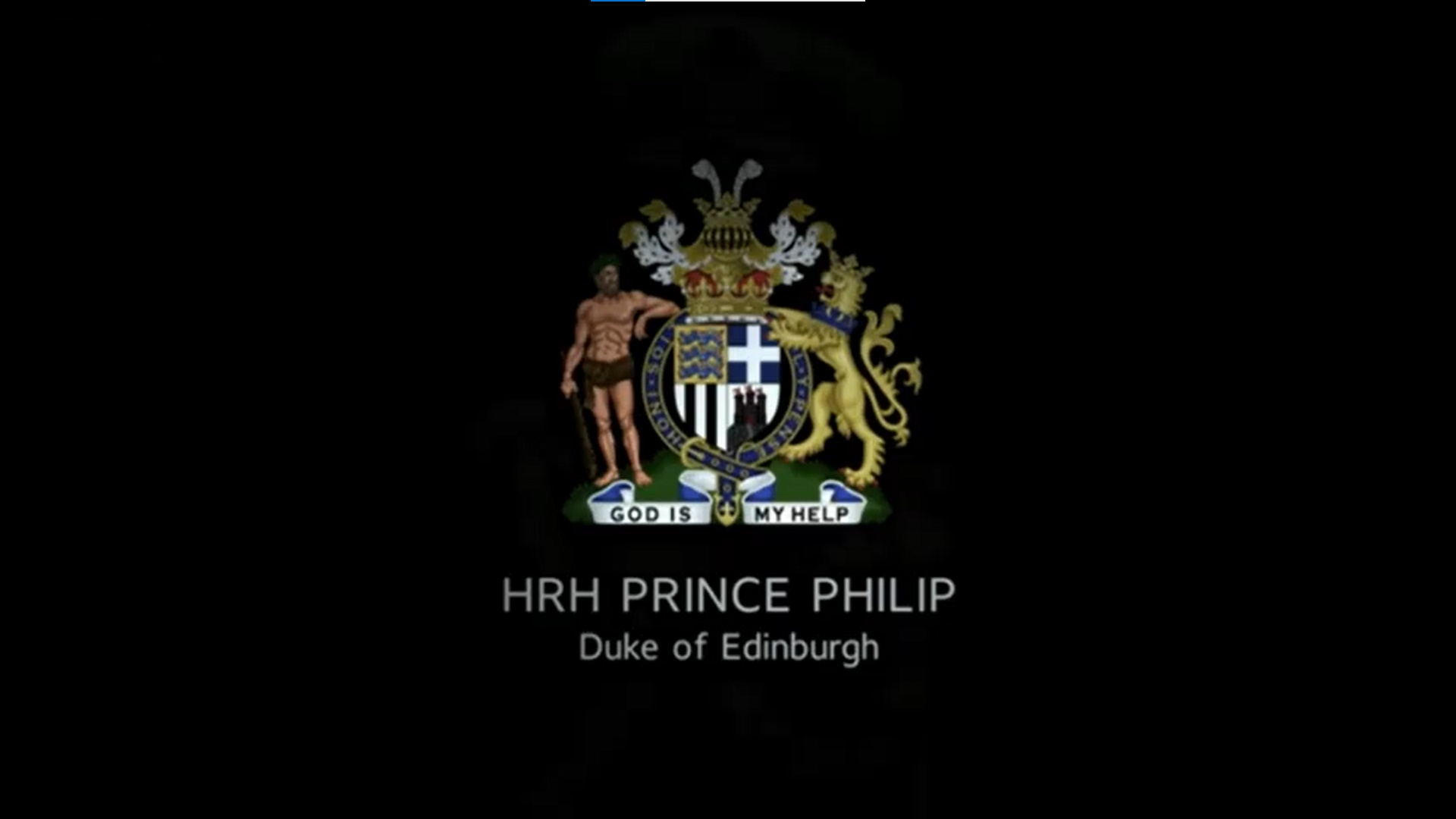
- Announcement of the death of the Duke of Edinburgh on the BBC News channel read by Martine Croxall

To formally announce the news on BBC One, the broadcast of the BBC Scotland programme Paramedics on Scene went dark, with a simple title card then appearing and announcing a news report would follow. Croxall announced the death of the Duke again before reading the press release. After the announcement, an image of the Duke was shown, with the national anthem played. Croxall continued to anchor the coverage before BBC News' lead anchor Huw Edwards took over from 1 pm. Meanwhile, on ITV, Eamonn Holmes was interviewing Alan Halsall on This Morning. He and Ruth Langsford interrupted Halsall and brought the programme to an end and the network changed its feed to ITN for Lucrezia Millarini to announce the news. The other major British broadcasters, Sky News, Channel 4 and Channel 5, had similar responses, and all networks suspended regular programming until various times in the afternoon and evening of 9 April; programming on BBC Four was suspended for the entire day. BBC television presenters have black clothing on hand in the case of sudden high-profile deaths, and a BBC guideline saw all presenters and guests, during suspended programming, wearing black. On BBC channels, presenters were still dressed in black over the weekend following the Duke's death and on 12 April, while ITV presenters on Good Morning Britain on that date were not. Channel 4 was later criticised for continuing with much of its planned schedule on the evening of 9 April, but both the BBC and ITV received a flood of viewer complaints for postponing or cancelling their regular programmes to allow continuous coverage. Viewer ratings fell across the television networks except Channel 4, which gained viewers. By 13 April the BBC had received nearly 111,000 complaints over its coverage, overtaking Jerry Springer: The Opera as the United Kingdom's most complained about broadcast.

On BBC Radio, all stations were forcibly cut-off at 12:10 pm, and following a brief silence, the Radio 4 continuity announcer Tom Sandars read the official announcement before the national anthem was played. Sandars then repeated the announcement and all stations then took a special BBC News programme presented by Evan Davis. The all-network simulcast continued until 4 pm, when both Radio 1 and 1Xtra switched to a mix of instrumental music and regular announcements. Radios 2 and 3 broke away an hour later, and began playing easy listening and classical music respectively for the rest of the evening. Commercial radio networks had varying responses to the news – LBC broke the news at the time the official announcement was published; the rest of the Global networks, including Capital, Heart and Smooth, first broke the news in a special bulletin at 12:15 pm. The Bauer Radio networks, such as Absolute Radio, Greatest Hits Radio, Hits Radio and Jazz FM, waited until 12:30 pm to announce the news. Following the initial announcement, all commercial music stations suspended advertisements and continuously played easy listening songs with frequent announcements briefly informing listeners of the news.

In the United States the American Broadcasting Company (ABC), CBS and NBC all broke into morning programming to announce the Duke's death. The Australian Broadcasting Corporation (ABC) also put a halt into regular broadcasting to report the news.

=== Coverage of funeral ===
NBC News outside Buckingham Palace during the funeral

The BBC covered the funeral on BBC One and BBC News, and on Radio 4 and Radio 5 Live. The lead presenters for its television coverage were Huw Edwards, Sophie Raworth, the former Royal Marine JJ Chalmers; Martha Kearney hosted the radio coverage alongside Jonny Dymond and Tracy Borman. The funeral was also broadcast on ITV, hosted by Tom Bradby, as well as on Sky News and Sky One, hosted by Dermot Murnaghan. ABC, CBS, CNN, Fox News, MSNBC, NBC and BBC America broadcast the funeral in the United States. An estimated 13.6 million people watched the event in the UK.

== Thanksgiving service ==
=== Service ===
A service of thanksgiving for the Duke's life took place at Westminster Abbey on 29 March 2022 with the Queen in attendance. She was accompanied by her second son, the Duke of York, on her way from Windsor to the abbey's side entrance and on her way out of the abbey through the south transept. It marked her first major public appearance after experiencing mobility issues and testing positive for COVID-19. The service was broadcast on BBC One and presented by Huw Edwards.

The service lasted for 45 minutes and included elements that could not have been implemented during the funeral service, including the Duke of Edinburgh's Gold Award recipients lining the entry to Westminster Abbey. The flowers decorating the abbey included roses, carnations, eryngium (sea holly) and dendrobium orchids. Orchids were a part of the Queen's wedding bouquet and sea holly was chosen in tribute to the Duke's naval career. The Queen, the Duchess of Cornwall, the Princess Royal, the Queen of Spain and Princess Beatrix of the Netherlands wore outfits with the shades of Edinburgh green, the Duke's official livery colour, and the Queen adorned her coat with a brooch given to her by Philip over 50 years ago, while the Duchess of Cornwall wore the silver Bugle Horn brooch of The Rifles, of which both she and the late Duke have been colonels-in-chief.

David Hoyle, Dean of Westminster; David Conner, Dean of Windsor; and Justin Welby, Archbishop of Canterbury, officiated at the thanksgiving service. The Westminster Abbey and the Chapel Royal Choirs performed at the service, while the Royal Marines provided the music at the beginning and the end of the ceremony. The Household Cavalry trumpeters and the Central Band of the Royal Air Force were also part of the service. Music before the service included "Andante cantabile" from Symphony No 3 by Charles-Marie Widor, "Bist du bei mir BWV 508" by Gottfried Heinrich Stölzel (arranged by Johann Sebastian Bach), "Salix" from Plymouth Suite by Percy Whitlock, Prelude to 49th Parallel by Ralph Vaughan Williams, "Elsa's Procession to the Cathedral" by Richard Wagner, "Canterbury Chorale" by Jan Van der Roost, Lux Aurumque by Eric Whitacre, "Men of Honour Part 2" by Mark Isham, "Pacific", "Shepherd's Song" from Ludwig van Beethoven's Symphony No. 6; and "Benedictus" from Sonata Britannica by Charles Villiers Stanford. The hymn "To Be a Pilgrim" by John Bunyan was sung to an arrangement by James O'Donnell as the Queen made her way to her seat.

In the bidding, the Dean of Westminster paid tribute to the Duke as a person who "put privilege to work and understood his rank as a spur to service". Doyin Sonibare, a gold award winner, paid tribute to Philip during her speech. The first lesson, Isaiah 40:25–31, was read by the Lord Wallace of Tankerness, followed by the choir singing William Byrd's "Prevent us, O Lord" from the Book of Common Prayer. Dame Sarah Mullally read the second lesson, Philippians 4:4–9, after which the choir and attendees sang "All Creatures of Our God and King" by William Henry Draper to an arrangement by James O'Donnell. The Dean of Windsor delivered an address, mentioning that the Duke would have hated the idea of being remembered as a "plaster saint" as he had no tolerance for "pomposity or flattery" during his lifetime. Following his address the choir sang Te Deum in C by Benjamin Britten. Prayers were then delivered by Mark Birch, Minor Canon and Precentor; Kenneth MacKenzie, Minister of Crathie Church; Paul Fergusson, Dean of the Order of the Thistle and of the Chapel Royal, Scotland; Martin Poll, Chaplain to the Royal Chapel of All Saints, Windsor Great Park; Paul Wright, Sub-Dean of Her Majesty's Chapels Royal; James Hawkey, Canon in Residence. The choir and attendees sang William Williams Pantycelyn's "Guide Me, O Thou Great Redeemer" before the Archbishop of Canterbury gave the blessing. The event ended with the attendees singing "God Save the Queen". At the service's conclusion, the Queen thanked Doyin Sonibare and the clergy who took part in the service. Music after the service included "Allegro molto e ritmico" from Sonata Britannica, and "The Seafarers" played by the Band of Her Majesty's Royal Marines Portsmouth.

=== Guests ===
1,800 people were present for the service at Westminster Abbey. Along with European and Asian royalty in attendance, 500 representatives of the charities and patronages affiliated with the Duke attended the service, along with members of the Queen and the Duke's household, representatives of the British and overseas governments, more than 100 members of the armed forces (including Highlanders Pipe Major and the Grenadier Guards Bearer Party who took part in the funeral), realm high commissioners, and the regiments associated with the Duke. Guests at the service included:

==== Immediate family ====
- The Queen, the Duke's widow
  - The Prince of Wales and The Duchess of Cornwall, the Duke's son and daughter-in-law
    - The Duke and Duchess of Cambridge, the Duke's grandson and granddaughter-in-law
      - Prince George of Cambridge, the Duke's great-grandson
      - Princess Charlotte of Cambridge, the Duke's great-granddaughter
  - The Princess Royal and Vice Admiral Sir Timothy Laurence, the Duke's daughter and son-in-law
    - Peter Phillips, the Duke's grandson
      - Savannah Phillips, the Duke's great-granddaughter
      - Isla Phillips, the Duke's great-granddaughter
    - Zara and Michael Tindall, the Duke's granddaughter and grandson-in-law
      - Mia Tindall, the Duke's great-granddaughter
  - The Duke of York, the Duke's son
    - Princess Beatrice and Edoardo Mapelli Mozzi, the Duke's granddaughter and grandson-in-law
    - Princess Eugenie and Jack Brooksbank, the Duke's granddaughter and grandson-in-law
  - The Earl and Countess of Wessex and Forfar, the Duke's son and daughter-in-law
    - Lady Louise Mountbatten-Windsor, the Duke's granddaughter
    - Viscount Severn, the Duke's grandson

Philip's grandson and granddaughter-in-law, the Duke and Duchess of Sussex, who reside in the United States, did not attend the memorial service due to self-expressed security concerns.

Other descendants of the Queen's father King George VI

- The Princess Margaret, Countess of Snowdon's family:
  - The Earl of Snowdon, the Queen's nephew
    - Viscount Linley, the Queen's great-nephew
    - Lady Margarita Armstrong-Jones, the Queen's great-niece
  - Lady Sarah and Daniel Chatto, the Queen's niece and her husband
    - Samuel Chatto, the Queen's great-nephew
    - Arthur Chatto, the Queen's great-nephew

Other descendants of the Queen's paternal grandfather King George V and their families

- The Duke and Duchess of Gloucester, the Duke's second cousin once removed and his wife
  - Earl of Ulster, the Duke's second cousin twice removed
  - Lady Rose and George Gilman, the Duke's second cousin twice removed and her husband
- The Duke of Kent, the Duke's first cousin once removed
  - Earl and Countess of St Andrews, the Duke's first cousin twice removed and his wife
    - Lord Downpatrick, the Duke's first cousin thrice removed
    - Lady Amelia Windsor, the Duke's first cousin thrice removed
  - Lady Helen Taylor, the Duke's first cousin twice removed
    - Cassius Taylor, the Duke's first cousin thrice removed
  - Lord Nicholas Windsor, the Duke's first cousin twice removed
- Princess Alexandra, The Hon. Lady Ogilvy's family:
  - James and Julia Ogilvy, the Duke's first cousin twice removed and his wife
    - Flora and Timothy Vesterberg, the Duke's first cousin thrice removed and her husband
  - Marina Ogilvy's family:
    - Zenouska Mowatt, the Duke's first cousin thrice removed
- Prince and Princess Michael of Kent, the Duke's first cousin once removed and his wife
  - Lord and Lady Frederick Windsor, the Duke's first cousin twice removed and his wife
  - Lady Gabriella and Thomas Kingston, the Duke's first cousin twice removed and her husband

Other descendants of the Queen's paternal great-grandfather King Edward VII

- The Duke of Fife, the Duke's second cousin twice removed
- Lady Alexandra Etherington, the Duke's second cousin twice removed

Mountbatten family

- The Marquess and Marchioness of Milford Haven, the Duke's first cousin once removed and his wife
- Lord Ivar Mountbatten and James Coyle, the Duke's first cousin once removed and his husband
- The Countess Mountbatten of Burma, wife of the Duke's first cousin once removed
  - Lord and Lady Brabourne, the Duke's first cousin twice removed and his wife
  - Lady Alexandra and Thomas Hooper, the Duke's first cousin twice removed and her husband
- The Hon. Philip Knatchbull, the Duke's first cousin once removed
- The Hon. Timothy and Isabella Knatchbull, the Duke's first cousin once removed and his wife
- Lady Pamela Hicks's family:
  - Ashley Hicks, the Duke's first cousin once removed
  - India Hicks and David Flint Wood, the Duke's first cousin once removed and her husband

Descendants of Princess Margarita of Greece and Denmark

- The Dowager Princess of Hohenlohe-Langenburg, the Duke's niece-in-law
  - Princess Cécile of Hohenlohe-Langenburg and Ajoy Mani, the Duke's grandniece and grandnephew-in-law
  - The Prince and Princess of Hohenlohe-Langenburg, the Duke's grandnephew and grandniece-in-law
    - The Hereditary Prince of Hohenlohe-Langenburg, the Duke's great-grandnephew
- Prince Andreas of Hohenlohe-Langenburg's family:
  - Princess Katharina of Waldeck-Pyrmont, the Duke's grandniece
  - Princess Tatjana of Hohenlohe-Langenburg, the Duke's grandniece
- Prince Albrecht of Hohenlohe-Langenburg's family:
  - Prince Ludwig of Hohenlohe-Langenburg, the Duke's grandnephew

Descendants of Princess Theodora of Greece and Denmark

- Princess Margarita of Baden's family:
  - Prince Nikola of Yugoslavia, the Duke's grandnephew
  - Princess Katarina of Yugoslavia, the Duke's grandniece
    - Victoria de Silva, the Duke's great-grandniece
- Maximilian, Margrave of Baden's family:
  - The Hereditary Prince and Hereditary Princess of Baden, the Duke's grandnephew and grandniece-in-law
  - Prince Leopold of Baden, the Duke's grandnephew
  - Prince Michael and Princess Christina of Baden, the Duke's grandnephew and grandniece-in-law
- Prince Ludwig of Baden's family:
  - Prince Berthold and Princess Nina of Baden, the Duke's grandnephew and grandniece-in-law

Descendants of Princess Sophie of Greece and Denmark's father-in-law Prince Frederick Charles of Hesse

- The Landgrave and Landgravine of Hesse, the Duke's third cousin once removed and his wife

Descendants of the Duke's father's second cousin Anastasia de Torby

- The Duchess of Westminster, the Duke's third cousin once removed

Rhys-Jones family

- Christopher Rhys-Jones, father of the Duke's daughter-in-law
  - David Rhys-Jones, brother of the Duke's daughter-in-law

==== Foreign royalty ====
===== Reigning houses =====
- The Queen of Denmark, the Duke's second cousin once removed
- The King and Queen of Sweden, the Duke's third cousin and his wife
- (Sweden) Princess Christina, Mrs. Magnuson, the Duke's third cousin
- (Belgium) The King and Queen of the Belgians, the Duke's second cousin twice removed and his wife
- The King and Queen of Spain, the Duke's first cousin twice removed and his wife
- Princess Beatrix of the Netherlands, the Duke's fifth cousin once removed
  - The King and Queen of the Netherlands, the Duke's fifth cousin twice removed and his wife
- The Grand Duchess of Luxembourg, wife of the Duke's second cousin twice removed
- The Prince of Monaco, the Duke's fourth cousin twice removed
- The Crown Prince of Bahrain (representing the King of Bahrain)
- Prince Hassan and Princess Sarvath of Jordan (representing the King of Jordan)

The King and Queen of Norway who were set to attend the service did not travel to the UK as the King was still recovering from COVID-19. The King is the Duke's second cousin once removed.

===== Non-reigning houses =====
- Margareta, Custodian of the Crown of Romania, and Prince Radu of Romania, the Duke's first cousin twice removed and her husband
- Crown Prince Alexander and Crown Princess Katherine of Yugoslavia, the Duke's first cousin twice removed and his wife
- Kyril, Prince of Preslav, the Duke's fifth cousin
- Queen Anne-Marie of the Hellenes, the Duke's second cousin once removed
  - Crown Prince Pavlos and Crown Princess Marie-Chantal of Greece, the Duke's first cousin twice removed and his wife
  - Prince Philippos and Princess Nina of Greece and Denmark, the Duke's first cousin twice removed and godson and his wife

==== Politicians and officeholders ====
- Boris Johnson, Prime Minister of the United Kingdom
- Rishi Sunak, Chancellor of the Exchequer
- Liz Truss, the Foreign Secretary
- Priti Patel, the Home Secretary
- Brandon Lewis, Secretary of State for Northern Ireland
- The Lord McFall of Alcluith, Lord Speaker of the House of Lords
- Dame Eleanor Laing, Deputy Speaker of the House of Commons
- Nicola Sturgeon, First Minister of Scotland, and her husband Peter Murrell, chief executive officer of the Scottish National Party
- Mark Drakeford, First Minister of Wales
- Alison Johnstone, Presiding Officer of the Scottish Parliament
- Elin Jones, Presiding Officer of the Senedd
- Sir Keir Starmer, Leader of the Opposition
- Ian Blackford, Leader of the Scottish National Party in the House of Commons
- Sir Ed Davey, Leader of the Liberal Democrats
- Sir Jeffrey Donaldson, Leader of the Democratic Unionist Party
- Admiral Sir Antony Radakin, Chief of the Defence Staff
- Admiral Sir Timothy Fraser, Vice-Chief of the Defence Staff
- Admiral Sir Ben Key, First Sea Lord and Chief of the Naval Staff
- General Sir Mark Carleton-Smith, Chief of the General Staff
- Air Chief Marshal Sir Michael Wigston, Chief of the Air Staff
- General Sir Patrick Sanders, Commander Strategic Command
- Dame Cressida Dick, Commissioner of the Metropolitan Police
- Sir Chris Whitty, Chief Medical Officer for England
- The Baroness Scotland of Asthal, Commonwealth Secretary General
- The Baroness Benjamin, Member of the House of Lords
- The Baroness Grey-Thompson, Member of the House of Lords
- The Lord Boateng, Member of the House of Lords
- The Marquess of Cholmondeley, Lord Great Chamberlain, and his wife, the Marchioness of Cholmondeley
- The Lord de Mauley, Master of the Horse
- The Earl Peel, former Lord Chamberlain of the Household

==== Other figures ====
- Sir David Attenborough
- Sir Jackie Stewart
- Leonora, Countess of Lichfield, ex-wife of the Queen's first cousin once removed
- The Duke of Devonshire
