= 2021 Demise Honours =

British honours given after the death of Prince Philip, Duke of Edinburgh

A list of Honours was released on 10 June 2021, and made appointments and promotions within the Royal Victorian Order, as well as awards of the Royal Victorian Medal, on the demise of Prince Philip, Duke of Edinburgh, on 9 April 2021. Recipients included former members of the Household of the Duke of Edinburgh and members of the Bearer Party at the funeral of Prince Philip, Duke of Edinburgh. The list was released on 10 June 2021, the 100th anniversary of the birth of the Duke of Edinburgh.

== Commanders of the Royal Victorian Order (CVO) ==
- Brigadier Archibald John Miller-Bakewell, lately Private Secretary and Treasurer to The Duke of Edinburgh

== Lieutenants of the Royal Victorian Order (LVO) ==
- William Allan Henderson, MVO RVM, lately Page to The Duke of Edinburgh
- Suzy Juliet Lethbridge, MVO, lately Correspondence Secretary, The Duke of Edinburgh's Household
- Rachel Louise Loryman, MVO, lately Assistant Private Secretary to The Duke of Edinburgh
- Alexandra Gay McCreery, MVO, lately Archivist and Librarian to The Duke of Edinburgh
- Lieutenant Colonel Guy Charles Gideon Rees Stone, Welsh Guards, Brigade Major, Household Division, Funeral of The Duke of Edinburgh

== Members of the Royal Victorian Order (MVO) ==
- David Berwick, RVM, lately Valet to The Duke of Edinburgh
- Warrant Officer Class 1 Robert McAusland Hendersen, Royal Marines, Bearer Party, Funeral of The Duke of Edinburgh
- Lieutenant Alec Garnet Heywood, Grenadier Guards, Bearer Party, Funeral of The Duke of Edinburgh
- Warrant Officer Class 2 Vandell Alexander McLean, Grenadier Guards, Bearer Party, Funeral of The Duke of Edinburgh
- Warrant Officer Class 1 Andrew John Stokes, Coldstream Guards, Garrison Sergeant Major, Funeral of The Duke of Edinburgh
- Captain Mark Christopher John Thrift, Royal Marines, Bearer Party, Funeral of The Duke of Edinburgh

== Royal Victorian Medal (Silver) ==
- Lance Sergeant Joshua Charles Andrews, Grenadier Guards, Bearer Party, Funeral of The Duke of Edinburgh
- Sergeant Jack Stephen Booth, Royal Marines, Bearer Party, Funeral of The Duke of Edinburgh
- Guardsman Daniel Alexander Coghlan, Grenadier Guards, Bearer Party, Funeral of The Duke of Edinburgh
- Warrant Officer Class 2 James Michael Cunningham, Royal Marines, Bearer Party, Funeral of The Duke of Edinburgh.
- Corporal Craig Nicholas Brian French, Corps of Royal Electrical and Mechanical Engineers, Land Rover Hearse Crew, Funeral of The Duke of Edinburgh
- Colour Sergeant Toni Galacki, Royal Marines, Bearer Party, Funeral of The Duke of Edinburgh
- Warrant Officer Class 2 Andrew Lavelle, Royal Marines, Bearer Party, Funeral of The Duke of Edinburgh
- Guardsman James Gabriel Lear, Grenadier Guards, Bearer Party, Funeral of The Duke of Edinburgh
- Guardsman Callum Lee Mason, Grenadier Guards, Bearer Party, Funeral of The Duke of Edinburgh
- Sergeant Alexander James McCallum, Royal Marines, Bearer Party, Funeral of The Duke of Edinburgh
- Guardsman Luke Christopher McGann, Grenadier Guards, Bearer Party, Funeral of The Duke of Edinburgh
- Lance Corporal Danny John McKenna, Grenadier Guards, Bearer Party, Funeral of The Duke of Edinburgh
- Sergeant Stuart Brynley Morgan, Royal Marines, Bearer Party, Funeral of The Duke of Edinburgh
- Corporal Louis Jordan Murray, Corps of Royal Electrical and Mechanical Engineers, Land Rover Hearse Crew, Funeral of The Duke of Edinburgh
- Lance Corporal (Acting Lance Sergeant) George Robert Parker, Grenadier Guards, Bearer Party, Funeral of The Duke of Edinburgh
- Colour Sergeant Stuart James Pearson, Royal Marines, Bearer Party, Funeral of The Duke of Edinburgh
- Guardsman William Michael Leslie Stark, Grenadier Guards, Bearer Party, Funeral of The Duke of Edinburgh
- Colour Sergeant Graham Christopher Tait, Royal Marines, Bearer Party, Funeral of The Duke of Edinburgh
- Guardsman Samuel James Tudor, Grenadier Guards, Bearer Party, Funeral of The Duke of Edinburgh
- Sergeant Tyla Aaron White, Royal Marines, Bearer Party, Funeral of The Duke of Edinburgh
- Lance Corporal George Anthony Whyte, Grenadier Guards, Bearer Party, Funeral of The Duke of Edinburgh
- Sergeant (Acting Colour Sergeant) Matthew Williams, Royal Marines, Bearer Party, Funeral of The Duke of Edinburgh
