= Jubilate Deo (Britten) =

1961 sacred choral composition by Benjamin Britten

- Choral composition by Benjamin Britten
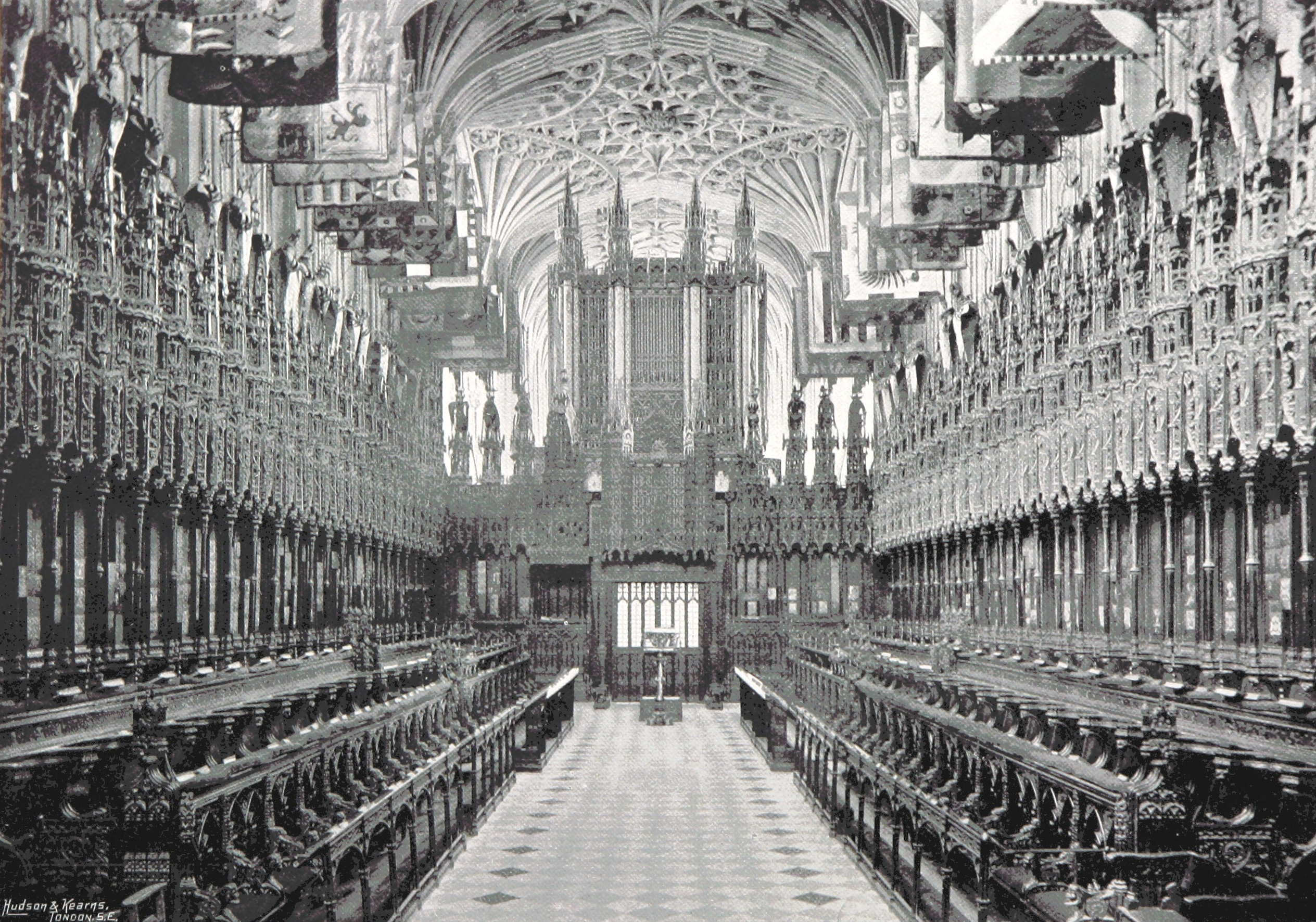
- Interior of St George's Chapel, Windsor
- Other name: Jubilate in C
- Key: C major
- Text: Psalm 100 (1662 Book of Common Prayer)
- Language: English
- Composed: 1961
- Dedication: St George's Chapel, Windsor Castle, at the request of Prince Philip, Duke of Edinburgh
- Performed: 1961: St George's Chapel
- Scoring: four-part choir (SATB); organ

Benjamin Britten's Jubilate Deo is a sacred choral setting of Psalm 100 in English, written in 1961 for St George's Chapel, Windsor Castle, "at the request of H.R.H. The Duke of Edinburgh". Britten scored the joyful music in C major for four-part choir and organ. A late companion piece to his 1934 Te Deum in C, it is also known as his Jubilate in C. It has been performed and recorded often, including on Prince Philip's 80th and 90th birthdays, and for his funeral service on 17 April 2021.

== History ==
In 1953, Queen Elizabeth II and her husband Philip, Duke of Edinburgh, attended the premiere of Britten's Gloriana, an opera about the reign of Elizabeth I, composed for the festivities surrounding the coronation of Elizabeth II that year. The royal couple dined with the composer after the performance. Later, perhaps in 1958, Philip requested that Britten compose a setting of Psalm 100 (Jubilate Deo) for St George's Chapel, Windsor Castle. The psalm is a regular part of Anglican morning prayer.

Britten completed the music in Aldeburgh in February 1961, using the version of Psalm 100 found in the Book of Common Prayer. He set it in C major for four-part choir (SATB) and organ. It was written as a companion piece to his earlier 1934 Te Deum in C, and was published in 1961 by Chester Music.

Although commissioned for St George's Chapel, Windsor, the Jubilate was first performed in Leeds Parish Church (subsequently Leeds Minster) in 1961. It has since been performed and recorded often, and was performed for Philip's 80th and 90th birthdays. At his request, the piece was included in his funeral service in the chapel on 17 April 2021, where it was performed by a small choir of four singers, with Luke Bond as the organist.

== Music ==
The music is in one movement, and takes about three minutes to perform. It is in C major, in 2/4 time, and marked "Lively". The work begins with the soprano and tenor voices taking turns with the alto and bass voices in singing alternate phrases, while other words are sung by all four voices together. The organ accompaniment is lively and rhythmic, largely comprising runs of scales. Jeremy Grimshaw observed that "the work features a distinctively intuitive harmonic language that nonetheless serves to illuminate rather than overshadow". Noting Britten's sensibility for clear expression of the text, sometimes by accentuating words, sometimes by emphasis by a melisma, he summarised the work as having "an ardent energy, deploying the words in long unbroken melodies", but sometimes pausing for reflection, and composing words such as "everlasting" with "rich, resonant harmonies".
