= Te Deum in C (Britten) =

- by Benjamin Britten
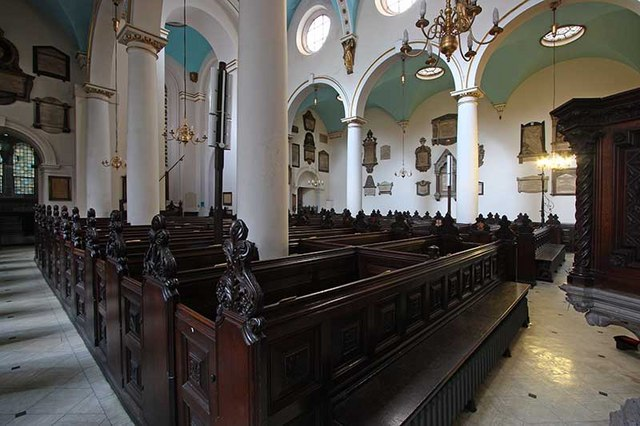
- St Michael, Cornhill, location of the work's premiere
- Key: C major
- Text: Te Deum
- Language: English
- Composed: 1934
- Performed: 13 November 1935: St Michael's, Cornhill, London
- Scoring: treble solo; four-part choir (SATB); organ

The Te Deum in C is a sacred choral composition by Benjamin Britten, a setting of the Te Deum on the English text from the Book of Common Prayer. Britten wrote it between 11 July and 17 September 1934. It is scored for a treble solo, four-part choir (SATB) and organ.

== History and versions ==
Britten dedicated the work: "Written for Maurice Vinden and the Choir of St Mark's, N. Audley St, London". It was first performed in concert at the medieval church of St Michael, Cornhill, London, on 13 November 1935 by the St Michael's Singers and organist George Thalben-Ball, with soprano May Bartlett, conducted by Harold Darke. The work was among Britten's first compositions to be published, by Oxford University Press.

Commissioned by the BBC, Britten orchestrated the work between 14 and 20 January 1936, for harp or piano and string orchestra. This version was first performed in concert at the Mercury Theatre, London, on 27 January 1936 in the Lemare concert series, by the Choir of St Alban the Martyr, Holborn, conducted by Reginald Goodall. Britten played the viola in the unnamed orchestra.

In 1961, Britten composed Jubilate Deo, also in C major, as a companion piece.

== Music ==
The music is in one movement and takes about 9 minutes to perform. It is based on an ostinato of the organ in the beginning and in the reprise after a contrasting middle section. Beginning pianissimo, the voices build chords from bass to soprano. Barry Holden describes it as follows: "In the opening pages it adheres steadfastly to a chord of C major in the choral parts, and builds its musical interest without traditional use of harmonic progression, but by use of short motifs which are constantly reworked". Gradually more intense, the voices reach a climax on "Holy, Holy, Holy". After a general rest, they proclaim in unison with the organ: "Lord God of Sabaoth". In the middle section the soloist addresses God softly: "Thou art the King of Glory, O Christ". The choir joins, not only in this line, for "O Christ", repeating that pattern also for the following acclamations up to "Thou didst open the Kingdom of Heav'n to all believers", finally just inserting "Christ". Holden comments: "The haunting treble solo which sets the individual against the chorus is a typically ingenious idea." A second climax is reached before a quiet ending. Paul Spicer summarizes the piece as having "drama, energy, variety, and clarity and integrity of structure".
