= Crown Honours Lists =

Lists of honours conferred upon citizens of the Commonwealth realms

Crown Honours Lists are lists of honours conferred upon citizens of the Commonwealth realms. The awards are presented by or in the name of the reigning monarch, currently King Charles III, or his vice-regal representative.

== New Year Honours ==
Honours have been awarded at New Year since at least 1890, in which year a list of Queen Victoria's awards was published in The London Gazette on 2 January. There was no honours list at New Year 1902, as a list had been published on the new king's birthday the previous November, but from January 1903 until 1909 a list (including only Indian orders) was published. The other orders were announced on the king's birthday in November.

Australia has discontinued New Year Honours, and now announces its honours on Australia Day, 26 January, and the King's Official Birthday holiday, in early June.

== Australia Day Honours ==
The Australia Day honours were established in 1975 to replace the New Year Honours in Australia. The list is issued on 26 January every year.

== Birthday Honours ==
Birthday Honours are part of the celebration of the reigning monarch's official birthday in each realm. The awards are presented by the reigning monarch or head of state, or their deputy.

Known as King's Birthday Honours (Queen's Birthday Honours in times of a female monarch), all royal honours are published in the London Gazette, Canada Gazette, Commonwealth of Australia Gazette and New Zealand Gazette. The lists are also published in the daily newspapers of each realm.

Honours have been awarded on the monarch's birthday since at least 9 November 1901, the birthday of King Edward VII (r. 1901–1910). After 1908 the monarch's official birthday was moved to the first, second or third Saturday in June (for the UK). Other Commonwealth realms celebrate the official birthday on different dates (generally late May or early June), and release their honours lists accordingly.

== Coronation Honours ==
Coronation honours are awarded by the sovereign to mark their coronation. The honours are usually those within the sovereign's personal gift.

== Jubilee Honours ==
Jubilee honours are awarded by the sovereign to mark their jubilee. The honours are usually those within the sovereign's personal gift.

== Demise Honours ==
Demise honours are awarded after the death of a member of the royal family, examples include the honours awarded after the deaths of Queen Elizabeth, The Queen Mother and Princess Margaret in 2002, Prince Philip, Duke of Edinburgh in 2021, and Queen Elizabeth II in 2023.

== Dissolution Honours ==
The Dissolution Honours List lists recipients of honours from the monarch after the dissolution of Parliament. Typically, the list will include retiring MPs, some of whom are customarily made life peers. The list may also include knighthoods for others who have served in Parliament, including those who may not want peerages. Appointments to the Privy Council of the United Kingdom are also made.

== Prime Minister's Resignation Honours ==
The Prime Minister's Resignation Honours in the United Kingdom are honours granted at the behest of an outgoing Prime Minister following his or her resignation. In such a list, a Prime Minister may ask the monarch to bestow peerages, or other lesser honours, on any number of people of his or her choosing. At times, the appointments created controversy: for example the 1976 Prime Minister's Resignation Honours, also known as "the Lavender List", about which BBC Four produced a docudrama.

An earlier scandal over David Lloyd George's 1922 Dissolution Honours list resulted in the Honours (Prevention of Abuses) Act 1925. Tony Blair did not issue a list, apparently because of the "Cash for Honours" scandal. Gordon Brown did not publish a resignation honours list either, but a dissolution list was issued on his advice (to similar effect). David Cameron revived the practice in his 2016 Prime Minister's Resignation Honours published on 4 August following his July resignation.

== Bravery Council Honours ==
Bravery Council honours lists recipients of Australian bravery honours. The lists are issued twice a year, in March and August.

== Special honours ==
As part of the British honours system, Special Honours are issued at the Monarch's pleasure at any given time. The Special Honours refer to the awards made within royal prerogative, operational honours, political honours and other honours awarded outside the New Year Honours and Birthday Honours.

Special honours are issued at random points throughout the year. Australia, New Zealand and the United Kingdom all issue special honours.

== See also ==
- Australian honours system
- Orders, decorations, and medals of Canada
- New Zealand royal honours system
- Orders, decorations, and medals of the United Kingdom
