= Prelude and Fugue on a Theme of Vittoria =

Solo organ composed by Benjamin Britten

- by Benjamin Britten
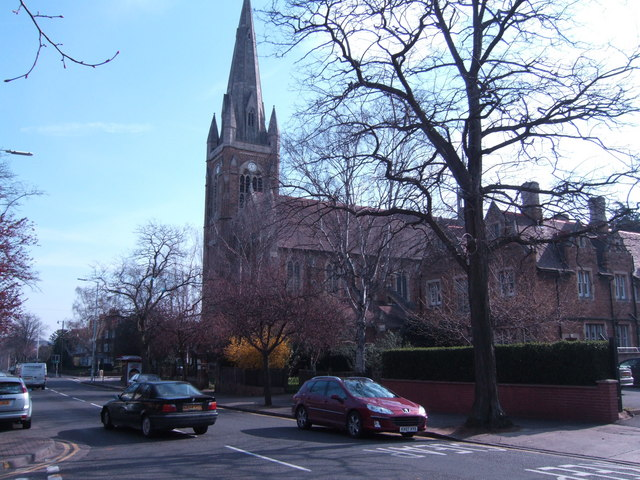
- St Matthew's Church, Northampton, for which the work was commissioned
- Form: Prelude and fugue
- Based on: Theme of Tomás Luis de Victoria
- Performed: 21 September 1946: St Matthew's Church, Northampton
- Scoring: organ

Prelude and Fugue on a Theme of Vittoria is a work for solo organ composed by Benjamin Britten in 1946. It was commissioned for St Matthew's Church, Northampton and first performed on 21 September 1946, St Matthew's Day, three days after its composition. It uses a theme from a motet by the Spanish composer Vittoria, both in the prelude (where it is played repeatedly on the pedals) and as the basis for the fugue. The piece, which lasts about five minutes in performance, has had a mixed reception. One writer has noted the difficulty on finding a suitable organ on which to perform the piece, given the difficulties in finding appropriate registration to meet Britten's requirements. A reviewer of a concert performance in the 1960s called it "a contrived attempt to make bricks without straw", although other commentators have been more favourable about the piece.

== Background ==
The English composer Benjamin Britten was asked to write the Prelude and Fugue for St Matthew's Church, Northampton. It was first performed there on St Matthew's Day (21 September) 1946, three days after it was composed. There is a story that he wrote it in bed one morning before breakfast. Britten had previously been commissioned by the vicar of St Matthew's, Walter Hussey, to write a cantata, Rejoice in the Lamb, for the church's fiftieth anniversary in 1943; the organ accompaniment for the cantata used the organ in a "strikingly original way". The Prelude and Fugue was one of two pieces based on themes by other composers that Britten wrote in 1946; the other was the Young Person's Guide to the Orchestra, which was based on a piece by Henry Purcell.

== Structure ==
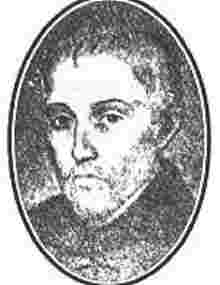
Tomás Luis de Victoria, composer of the theme upon which the piece is based

Both sections of the piece are based on a theme from a motet, Ecce sacerdos magnus ("Behold a great priest"), by the Spanish composer Tomás Luis de Victoria (or "Vittoria", 1548–1611). The theme, which comes from a plainchant melody used in Vittoria's day on the feast day of a saint and bishop, is nine notes long and does not range widely. The Prelude, which is in 4/2 time (four minims to a bar), opens with a statement of the theme played on the pedals in quintuplets (five quavers played in the time of four), marked ff, (fortissimo, "very loud"). The theme is repeated frequently in the pedals during the prelude, which is marked "largamente" ("broadly"). The prelude, which takes about one and a half minutes in performance, is thirteen bars long.

Vittoria's theme is also used (with little development) as the subject of the fugue. This section is in 3/4 time (three crochets to a bar) and is marked "Andante con moto" ("at a walking pace, with movement"). The fugue, which is mainly in four-part writing with frequent rhythmic changes, gradually builds to a climax. In bar 69, a new louder melody is added in the right hand against the fugue theme in the pedals. Gradually, the piece dies away to two parts and ppp (pianississimo, "very, very quietly") as the left and right hands play the fugue theme a bar apart from each other, in canon. The whole piece lasts about five minutes.

== Assessment ==
The piece has had a mixed reception. Even one of its supporters says that "players do not seem to like it much", despite it being written so that "the average parish organist might have a fair chance to play it."

The American musician Luther Noss reviewed the piece upon its publication by Boosey & Hawkes in 1952, stating that it was "well written for the organ" and "remarkably free" of some of the problems found in other modern organ music. He thought that it gave the impression of having been written with the organ in mind rather adapted from a piece intended for another instrument, unlike some other contemporary organ works. However, he commented that the theme provided little melodic or rhythmic interest and Britten used it, he thought, "not without a suggestion of monotony." Although the theme is "not the stuff of which great music is made", Noss remarked on the "exciting" pedal flourish at the opening of the piece, the attractive use of melody and harmony, and "grand crescendos and lingering diminuendos" to keep the listener interested. Another early reviewer described it as "spacious", with a "by no means academic" fugue and a style that "suggests a modern romantic composer's appreciation of the more austere aspects of the classical organ school." The review also noted that many of the accents marked in the piece "seem incapable of realization by any of the usual methods of suggesting accentuation of the organ."

It was included in a concert at St Clement Danes, London, in November 1963 that honoured Britten's fiftieth birthday with performances of some of his lesser-known works. The review in The Times remarked favourably on the Te Deum in C and the Six Metamorphoses after Ovid for solo oboe. Of the organ piece, though, the critic said that it was "a contrived attempt to make bricks without straw."

The organist Alan Harverson describes it as "excellent" and notes its "orthodox layout and textures", in comparison to the organ writing of Rejoice in the Lamb and the Festival Te Deum (1944). He regards the Prelude as "concise and majestic" and describes the ending as "touchingly serene" with a "charming canon". The musicologist and Britten expert Philip Brett describes the piece (without naming it) in The New Grove Dictionary of Music and Musicians as a "slight organ work".

The organist Timothy Bond disagrees with the piece's "bad press" and the "dismissive" comments made about it by Brett and others. According to Bond, this "fresh and vital" work is "a finer, more accomplished piece than it sometimes sounds in performance." He notes the difficulty of finding the best registration – no registration suggestions are given – and the best organ to perform the piece on, since it seems to require steady and considerable changes in volume without changes in the tone quality produced by the organ yet also demands neoclassical "brightness and clarity", a combination of requirements that it is difficult for organs to meet. On the right organ, however, Bond says that the piece can sound "particularly striking" and "harmonically bold and telling, if occasionally gauche", as it moves through passages that are "serene", "creepy", "vigorous", "nostalgic" and finally "serene", albeit with a "rather pedestrian" cadence.
