= Lord of the Flies (TV series) =

2026 British television series

- Promotional shot of David McKenna (Piggy)
- Genre: Drama; Folk horror
- Created by: Jack Thorne
- Based on: Lord of the Flies by William Golding
- Written by: Jack Thorne
- Directed by: Marc Munden
- Starring: Winston Sawyers; Lox Pratt; David McKenna; Ike Talbut
- Theme music composer: Benjamin Britten: Hans Zimmer; Kara Talve
- Composer: Cristobal Tapia de Veer
- Countries of origin: United Kingdom; Australia
- Original language: English
- No. of seasons: 1
- No. of episodes: 4

Production
- Executive producers: Joel Wilson; Jamie Campbell; Jack Thorne; Marc Munden; Nawfal Faizullah; Cailah Scobie
- Producer: Callum Devrell-Cameron
- Production locations: Malaysia; United Kingdom
- Cinematography: Mark Wolf
- Running time: 60 minutes
- Production companies: Eleven; One Shoe Films

Original release
- Network: BBC iPlayer; BBC One; Stan
- Release: 8 February 2026

Lord of the Flies is a television drama series based on the 1954 novel of the same name by William Golding. It is the first ever television adaptation of the novel. It was developed and written by Jack Thorne, directed by Marc Munden for BBC iPlayer and executive produced by Joel Wilson for BBC One in a co-production with Stan. The four-episode series was released on 8 February 2026.

== Premise ==
Following a plane crash, a group of young boys becomes stranded on a tropical island in the Pacific Ocean in the early 1950s. Ralph attempts to lead the boys, with help from the intellectual Nicholas "Piggy", in the hope of surviving and seeking rescue, but Jack starts a rebellion and their makeshift society starts to fall apart.

== Cast and characters ==
- Winston Sawyers as Ralph
- Lox Pratt as Jack
- David McKenna as Nicholas "Nicky/Piggy/Nickpig"
- Ike Talbut as Simon
  - In addition to Simon, he also provides the voice for the Lord of the Flies
- Thomas Connor as Roger
- Noah Flemyng as Sam
- Cassius Flemyng as Eric
- Cornelius Brandreth as Maurice
- Tom Page-Turner as Bill
- Rafael de Belligny as Robert
- Harrison Metcalf as Frankie
- Lake Coleman as Boy with Birthmark
- Freddie Lee-Grey as Percival
- Beau Thompson as Philip
- Fred Jones as Johnny
- Rory Kinnear as Ralph's Father
- Rochelle Neil as Ralph's Mother
- Daniel Mays as Fred
- Tom Goodman-Hill as Naval Officer

== Episodes ==
No.	Title	Directed by	Written by	Original release date	Broadcast date (UK)
1	"Piggy"	Marc Munden	Jack Thorne	8 February 2026	8 February 2026
Piggy awakens on an island after his plane crashes, and discovers fellow survivor Ralph. The pair explore and find a conch shell, which they use to draw the attention of other survivors, discovering that there are no adults among them. Piggy comes into conflict with the head chorister of the surviving choir, Jack, who vies for chief. However, Ralph is elected chief instead and Jack decides to turn his choir into the "hunters". Ralph chooses himself, Piggy, Jack and Simon, a chorister, to go on an expedition to articulate their surroundings. Whilst travelling up a mountain, the quartet discover the corpse of the plane's pilot and, against Piggy's pleas, throw it down a cliff in an attempt to give a naval burial. Meanwhile, rumours of a beast on the island emerge among the younger boys, nicknamed "littluns". Piggy and Jack find a trapped piglet, but Jack is unable to bring himself to kill it, only to blame Piggy when the piglet escapes. The group makes a pile of kindling at the top of the island, which Piggy realises is too large, but Ralph and Jack ignore his warnings and take his spectacles to start the signal fire. They quickly lose control of the fire, destroying a large portion of the island; afterwards Piggy realises a littlun has died and blames himself.
2	"Jack"	Marc Munden	Jack Thorne	8 February 2026	15 February 2026
Jack is fixated on killing a pig; he and Ralph bond over their frustrations about camp life. Jack attempts to climb to the plane wreckage, but freezes in fear and has to be coached down by Roger and Maurice, fellow choristers, after which Jack swears them to secrecy. Jack privately confides in Simon his worries about rescue and becomes increasingly obsessed with killing the pig. Ralph and Piggy struggle to keep the group in line as they become increasingly rowdy, bored, and paranoid of the beast, which Jack takes advantage of to promote his hunters. Jack leads his hunters, minus Simon, in painting their faces and hunting the pigs around the island. They succeed, and place a pig's head on a pike, which they carry with them. The group later discover suitcases from the plane, including Simon's, from which Jack takes his diary. However, they return and discover a ship passing, which does not stop as the hunters allowed the signal fire to go out. Ralph blames Jack for the group not being rescued, and Jack physically attacks Piggy after an argument, breaking his spectacles. Infuriated, Jack begins his own camp with the promise of not adhering to rules, only to break down in tears when alone. Ralph becomes despondent, but Piggy encourages him to continue as chief. In his new camp, Jack begins secretly reading Simon's diary.
3	"Simon"	Marc Munden	Jack Thorne	8 February 2026	22 February 2026
Simon is the only chorister to remain in Ralph's camp, aiding Ralph in work. Narration in the form of diary entries explore Simon's complicated relationship with religion and the depth of his feelings for Jack. Twins Sam and Eric witness a dead paratrooper land on the mountain and mistake him for the beast. Ralph's camp offer a truce with Jack, who determines that all of the "bigguns" will hunt the beast. Jack subtly taunts Simon by openly reading his diary. After Simon confronts Jack, he belittles the diary's meaning and refuses to return it. The bigguns climb the mountain, where they are terrified by the corpse, believing it to be the beast. Jack calls a meeting, where he agitates the boys and viciously beats Ralph when he attempts to take the conch shell. At night, Simon sneaks into Jack's shelter, reclaiming and destroying his diary. Simon admits to Piggy and Ralph that he is happier on the island than home. Jack departs to his own camp, luring other boys with promises of food and a party; Piggy and Ralph decide to go. Simon, however, slips away and communes with the pigs head on a pike; it claims to be the Lord of the Flies himself. It mocks Simon for being too scared to state his belief that the beast is simply imagined by the boys. Jack's party descends into animalistic chaos, and his hunters seize upon what they decide is the beast, stabbing the creature in a frenzy before dancing away down the beach. Afterwards, a stunned Ralph and Piggy silently return to their camp. A final diary entry describes the loneliness Simon felt at school, as it is revealed the creature was Simon, whose dead body is then washed out to sea.
4	"Ralph"	Marc Munden	Jack Thorne	8 February 2026	1 March 2026
Ralph is left traumatised by Simon's death and his passivity in allowing it. Only Piggy, Sam, Eric, and some littluns remain in his camp, as the rest join Jack. Flashbacks reveal Ralph's difficult home life, stemming from his mother's illness and eventual death. Jack's group loots their camp, stealing Piggy's spectacles to make fire. The remnants of Ralph's camp approaches Jack to demand their return, but he mocks Ralph and refuses. The meeting dissolves into fighting, which Piggy attempts to stop by invoking the conch shell. Roger, who now delights in violence, throws a rock at Piggy's head, shattering the conch and mortally wounding him. Ralph escapes with Piggy and cares for him throughout the day until he eventually dies. Ralph reunites with Sam and Eric, who were captured and tortured by Roger. Scared of Roger and Jack, they refuse to join Ralph again, but allow him to escape into the forest. Ralph confronts Jack a final time and tells him he has no interest in being chief over what the island has become; denouncing life on the island as a lost cause. The enraged Roger proposes the hunters start a fire to smoke Ralph out of hiding. Their plan works, but upon emerging onto the beach Ralph finds that the smoke has drawn the attention of a passing warship; and a naval officer has landed ashore. Upon seeing him, the hunters suddenly drop their weapons and come to their senses. The officer's initial amusement turns to shock when Ralph tells him about the deaths; he admonishes the boys for fighting and not acting in a proper British manner. Jack merely stands back silently as the other boys all walk to the boat.

== Production ==
Adapted from the 1954 novel of the same name by William Golding, Lord of the Flies was produced by Eleven for BBC iPlayer and BBC One in a co-production with Stan in Australia, and Sony Pictures Television as the international distributor. The adaptation consists of four 60-minute episodes, each titled after one of the main characters: Ralph, Piggy, Simon, and Jack. The series was made with the support of Golding's family. Stills were first released in October 2025. A trailer was released on 28 January 2026.

=== Casting ===
In October 2023, the BBC announced that Nina Gold would cast the series and that the production was seeking boys aged 10–13 years old with no acting experience required. Alongside the main cast, an ensemble of more than 20 boys will be playing the desert island camp's "big 'uns" and "little 'uns". The series has an ensemble cast of over 30 actors, many of whom are making their professional acting debuts.

=== Filming ===
In September 2024, principal photography was confirmed to be taking place in the Langkawi archipelago, Malaysia , with plans for filming in the UK later in the year.

=== Music ===
The main theme is taken from Benjamin Britten's opera Peter Grimes. There are also excerpts from Oliver Messiaen's Quartet for the End of Time. Hans Zimmer and Kara Talve of Bleeding Fingers Music wrote additional music, and original music for the series was written by Cristobal Tapia de Veer. In addition to original scoring, the series incorporates powerful classical pieces to intensify emotional moments:

- Benjamin Britten – Four Sea Interludes (from Peter Grimes)
- Arvo Pärt – Berliner Messe
- Dmitri Shostakovich – selected orchestral passages
- Olivier Messiaen – Quatuor pour la fin du temps

==== Church choral music ====
Music from the church choral tradition is used throughout the series.

Episode 1

- 16:40 – Benjamin Britten – Missa Brevis in D Kyrie without organ (first appearance of Jack and the choir).
- 38:20 – Ralph Vaughan Williams – Let all the World in Every Corner Sing (Piggy chasing the piglet).

Episode 2

- 00:30 – Arvo Pärt – Berliner Messe Sanctus.
- 05:05 – Benjamin Britten – Rejoice in the Lamb Alleluya from the heart of God (fragment) in episode ID card with radio static.
- 37:55 – Benjamin Britten – Rejoice in the Lamb Alleluya from the heart of God, (when the hunters attack and kill the sow).
- 41:30 – Benjamin Britten – Hymn to St Cecilia – Pt 2 I cannot grow (when the hunters bathe in the river after processing the slaughtered pig back to camp).

Episode 3

- 02:25 – Benjamin Britten – Missa Brevis in D Sanctus without organ (in flashback with choir in church).
- 55:45 – Benjamin Britten – Missa Brevis in D Sanctus this time with organ (Simon's body is washed out to sea).

Episode 4

- 56:00 – John Tavener – Funeral Canticle.

== Release ==
Sony Pictures Television is responsible for the series' international distribution. In February 2026, they confirmed that they had finalised licensing agreements that will see the series broadcast in Austria, Brazil, Canada, Estonia, Germany, Iceland, Israel, Japan, Latvia, Lithuania, Poland, Switzerland as well as other regions in Central and Eastern Europe and the Middle East and North Africa.

=== United Kingdom ===
All four episodes of the series were made available on BBC iPlayer in the United Kingdom on 8 February 2026. Later that same day, the first episode was broadcast on BBC One, with subsequent episodes airing weekly.

=== Internationally ===
- Australia: All four episodes of the series were made available on Stan in Australia on 8 February 2026.
- Brazil: In Brazil, the series premiered on 16 July 2026 on the Globoplay streaming service, which is owned by Grupo Globo.
- Canada: In Canada, the series aired on CBC with the first episode premiering on 22 October 2026, with episodes streaming on CBC Gem.
- Malaysia: In Malaysia, the series was aired on Rock X Stream.
- New Zealand: In New Zealand, the series was released on TVNZ 1 and TVNZ+.
- Portugal: In Portugal, the series was aired on AXN Portugal on 8 June 2026.
- United States: Sony Pictures Television confirmed in February 2026 that Netflix had acquired the U.S. rights to the series. The series was released on Netflix on May 4, 2026.

== Reception ==
=== Critical response ===
The series received positive reviews from critics. On the review aggregator website Rotten Tomatoes, 91% of 66 critics' reviews are positive. The website's critics consensus reads: "Fleshing out William Golding's text with thoughtful observations about boyhood and sharpened by a uniformly terrific troupe of child actors, this retelling of Lord of the Flies seizes the conch shell and commands attention." Metacritic, which uses a weighted average, assigned the film a score of 83 out of 100, based on 23 critics, indicating "universal acclaim".

Anita Singh of The Telegraph awarded the programme five stars, calling it "a first-class example of an adaptation done right", adding that it was "stunningly directed" and a "tour de force". The Spectator described the adaptation as "mesmerically brilliant", adding that it was "quite a shock to be reminded what truly great art the BBC is still capable of producing when it pulls out all the stops".

Writing for The Independent, Nick Hilton gave the series four stars and described it as "bold" and "brilliant", suggesting it would "terrify parents as much as Adolescence". Claudia Cockerell of The Standard, also rating it four stars, praised it as "a slick, visually rich adaptation of William Golding's classic", adding that "adapting a cultural monolith for TV is a delicate task, but Jack Thorne manages it with aplomb". Radio Times, also awarding four stars, commented that the adaptation serves as "a glorious reminder of the novel's power". Annabel Sampson of Tatler offered a strongly emotive response, describing the series as "blinding in its beauty and its brutality", and asserting that the adaptation "will get you right in the gut".

Lucy Mangan of The Guardian was more reserved, awarding three stars overall but highlighting that "the acting is absolutely excellent". In another three star review, the Financial Times called it a "beautiful, haunting and confusing adaptation" that "prizes artfulness over clarity". M.N. Miller of FandomWire described the series as "powerful, visceral, and mesmerizing from start to finish," adding that "the result is something extraordinary, hard to watch, and even harder to look away".

=== Accolades ===
Year	Award	Category	Recipient(s)	Result	Ref.
2026	Astra TV Awards	Best Limited Series or TV Movie Cast Ensemble	Lord of the Flies	Nominated	
2026	Black Reel TV Awards	Outstanding Lead Performance in a TV Movie or Limited Series	Winston Sawyers	Nominated	
2026	Gotham TV Awards	Outstanding Limited or Anthology Series	Jack Thorne, Jamie Campbell, Amanda Duthie, Nawfal Faizullah, Marc Munden, Cailah Scobie, and Joel Wilson	Nominated	
2026	Gotham TV Awards	Outstanding Supporting Performance in a Limited or Anthology Series	David McKenna	Nominated	
2026	IndieWire Honors	Wavelength Award	Jack Thorne and David McKenna	Honored	
2026	Location Managers Guild International Awards	Outstanding Locations in a TV Anthology, Movie, or Limited Series	Lord of the Flies	Nominated	
2026	Primetime Emmy Awards	Outstanding Sound Editing for a Limited or Anthology Series or Movie or Special	Niv Adiri, Tom Sayers, Linda Forsén, Phil Freudenfeld, Kirsty Graham, Paolo Pavesi, Zoe Freed, and Rebecca Heathcote (for "Piggy")	Nominated	
2026	Primetime Emmy Awards	Outstanding Sound Mixing for a Limited or Anthology Series or Movie	Niv Adiri, Glen Gathard, Tristan Rose, Mark Appleby, and James Bishop (for "Piggy")	Nominated	
2026	TCA Awards	Outstanding Achievement in Movies, Miniseries, or Specials	Lord of the Flies	Nominated	
