= St Matthew's Church, Northampton =

Coordinates: 52°15′08″N 0°52′39″W

St Matthew's Church
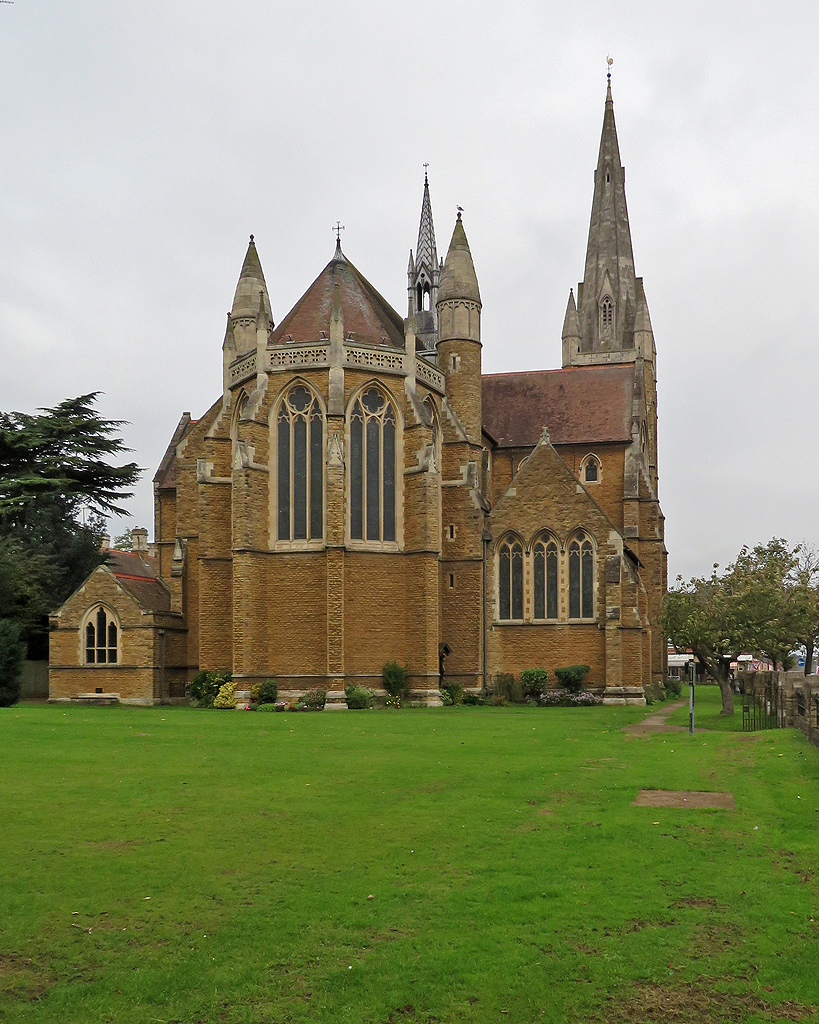
- St Matthew's Church, Northampton
- St Matthew's Church
- Country: England
- Denomination: Church of England
- Churchmanship: Anglo Catholic
- Website: www.stmatthews-northampton.org.uk

History
- Dedication: St Matthew

Administration
- Province: Canterbury
- Diocese: Peterborough

Clergy
- Vicar: Fr Nicholas Setterfield

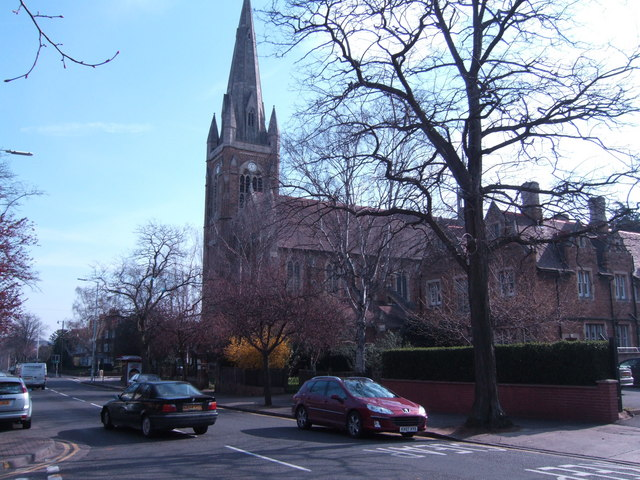
The church from Kettering Road

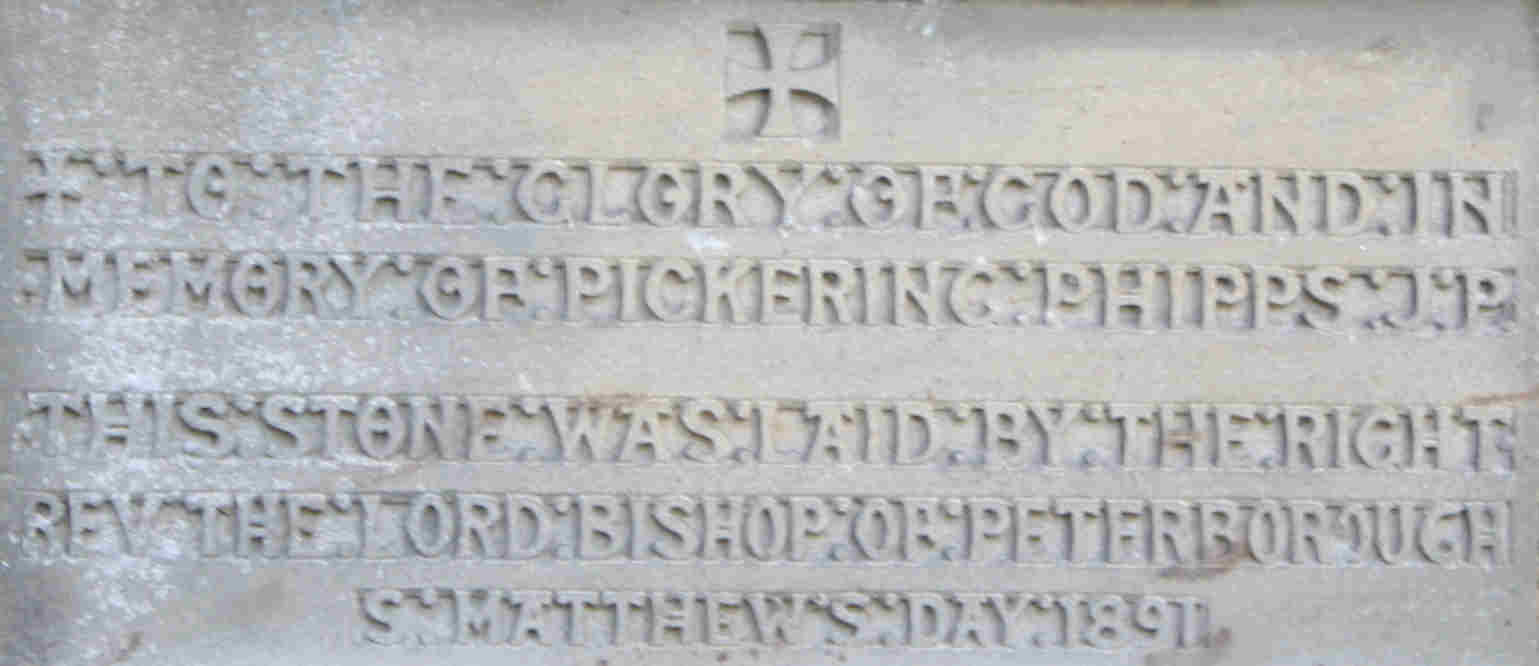
Foundation stone, laid on St Matthew's Day 1891

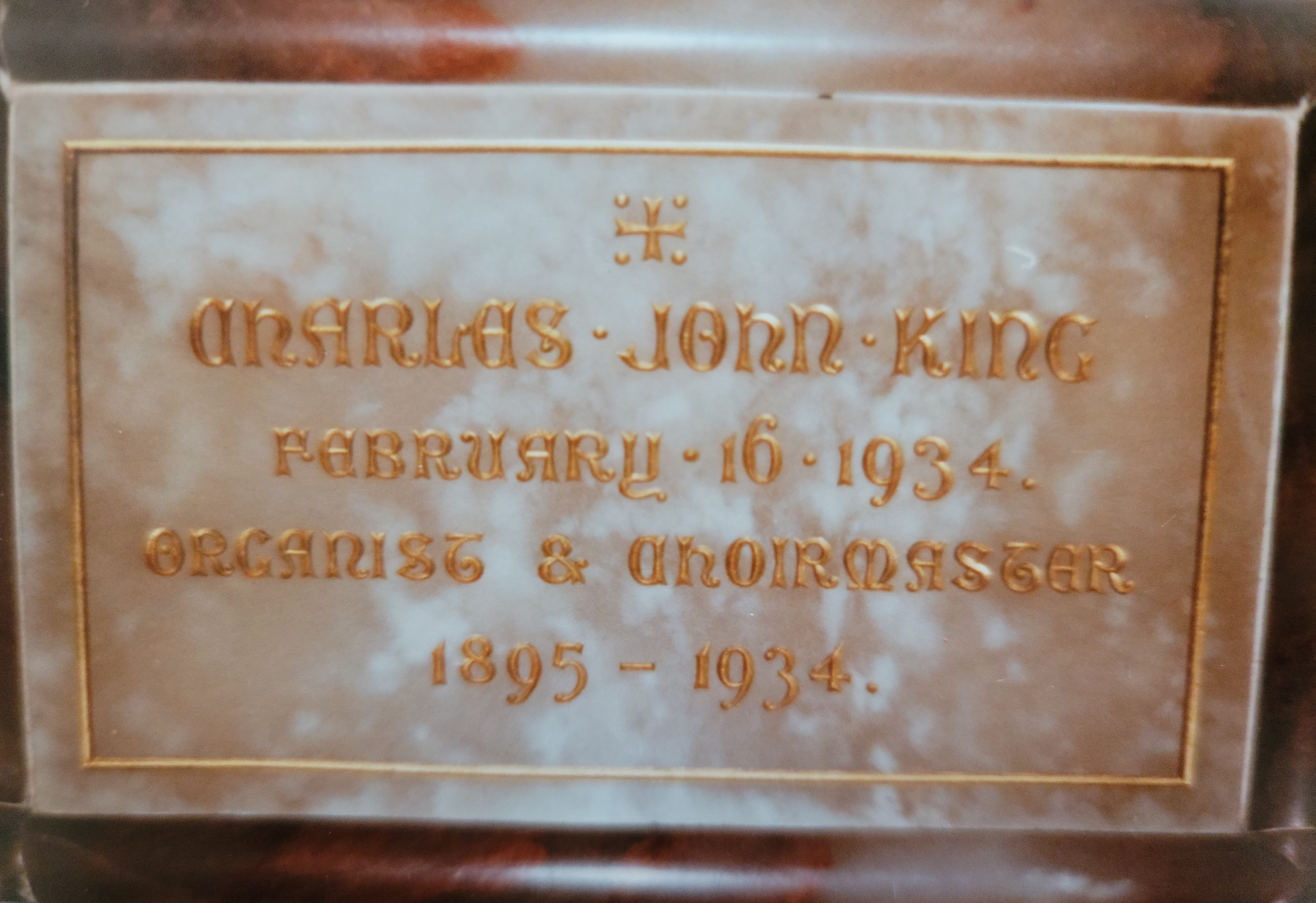
Memorial plaque commemorating the 39 years that Charles John King was organist and choirmaster. He had been a chorister and organ scholar at St George's Chapel, Windsor

St Matthew's Church, Northampton is a Church of England parish church in Northampton, within the Diocese of Peterborough.

The church is a Grade II* listed building. It was erected (1891–4) in memory of brewer and MP, Pickering Phipps, beside the Kettering Road (now the A5123). The architect was Matthew Holding.

Canon John Rowden Hussey was vicar from its consecration in 1893 to 1937. Walter Hussey, vicar from 1937 to 1955 succeeding his father, was a patron of the arts. He celebrated the church's 50th anniversary with a sequence of events and commissions: the commission of the anthem Rejoice in the Lamb from Benjamin Britten; a performance from the BBC Symphony Orchestra (2 October 1943); an organ recital by George Thalben-Ball, and the commission of Henry Moore's sculpture "Madonna and Child".

Buoyed by the success of the 1943–44 commissions, Hussey continued to commission new works of art. Other musical commissions included The Revival by Edmund Rubbra (1944); Festival Anthem by Lennox Berkeley (1945), Lo, the full, final sacrifice from Gerald Finzi (1946), and works by Christopher Headington, Malcolm Arnold and others. There were commissions of poetry: a Litany and Anthem for St Matthew's Day from W. H. Auden and The Outer Planet from Norman Nicholson. The recitals continued throughout this time, most notably with two concerts by the singer Kirsten Flagstad

In the north transept is Henry Moore's stone sculpture, "Madonna and Child" (1944) and in the south transept a painting of the Crucifixion (1946) by Graham Sutherland. The triptych in the Lady Chapel is by C. E. Buckeridge. A 2009 addition is a bronze statue of St Matthew by Ian Rank-Broadley.

A 1956 oil and watercolour painting of St Matthew's Church by John Piper is in the collection of the Northampton Museum and Art Gallery.

== Liturgy ==
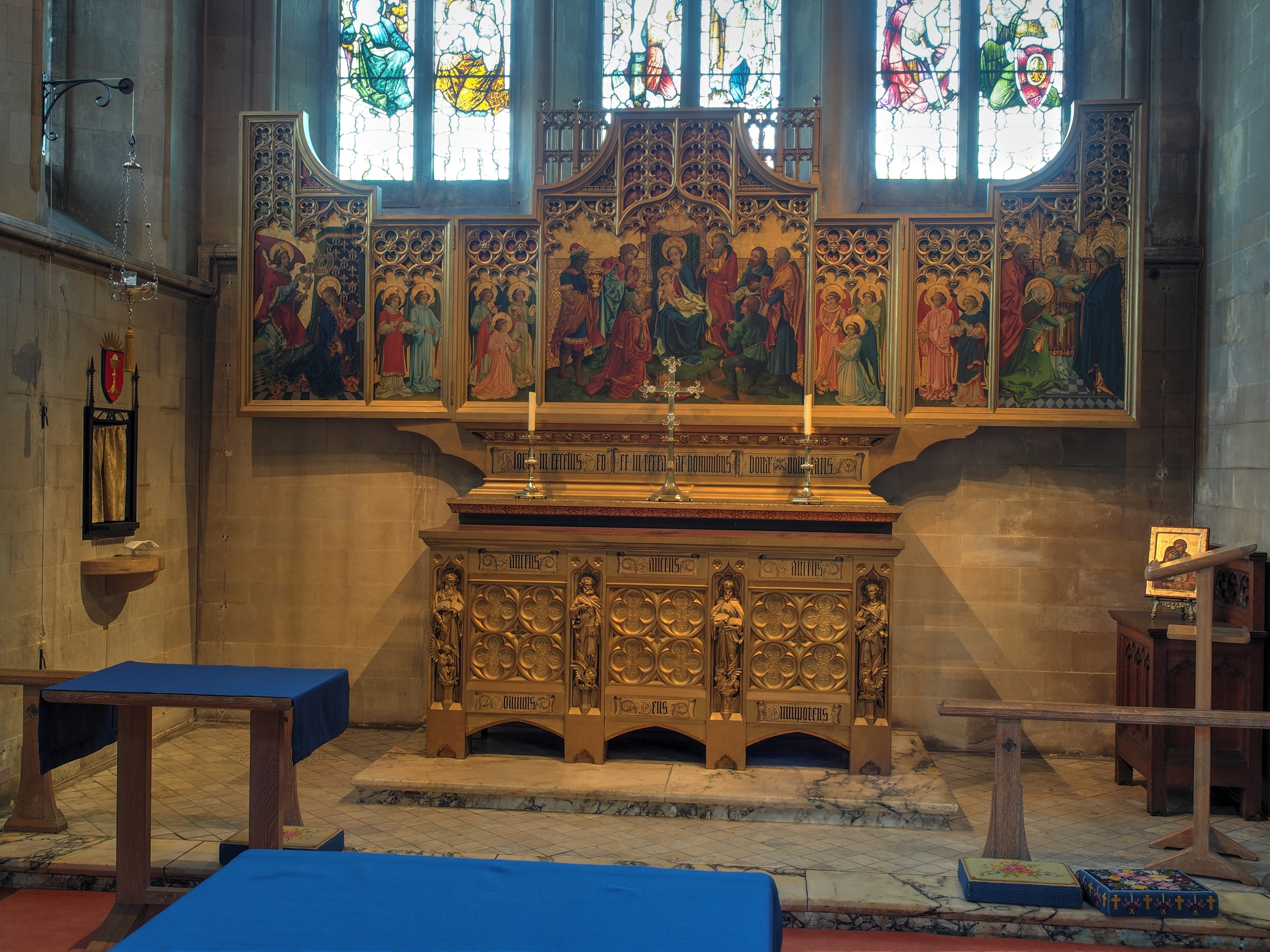
The triptych in the Lady Chapel by C. E. Buckeridge

St Matthew's follows an Anglican service with Catholic traits. The church celebrates one Eucharistic service on a Sunday, a Parish Mass at 10.15am which is often Choral. The Parish Mass is pro populo on the nave altar and the lectern has recently been moved from the chancel step to the high altar to make way for a traditional statue of St Matthew. Sunday Evening service is Choral Evensong twice a month with Benediction following the service on the third Sunday and Congregational Evensong on the second. The church maintains a daily Eucharist service and has done since its founding in 1893. The Daily Offices of Morning and Evening Prayer are also said publicly every day of the year.

== Ministers ==
- 1893-1937: John Rowden Hussey
- 1937-1955: Walter Hussey
- 1962-1966: Philip Turner
- 1975-1996: John Morton
- 1997-2002: Timothy Pilkington
- 2003-: Nicholas Setterfield

== Music ==
For many years St Matthew's had an all-male choir which was disbanded in the early 2000s. The choir now consists of girl and boy choristers aged 8–18 and adult Altos, Tenors and Basses who sing two services each Sunday. The church choir is supported by The St Matthew's Singers, a choir of local amateur singers, who sing Choral Mass on mid-week Feast Days. The whole music department is overseen by a Director of Music, Parish Organist and Organ Scholar.

The choir has undertaken a tour each year since 2012. These have included week-long trips to sing at St Davids (2012), Portsmouth (2013), Carlisle (2014), Exeter (2015) and Chester (2016), Ely (2017) and Germany (2018). The choir has released two CDs in recent years; in 2013 a disc of music for Advent and Christmas, and in 2014 a recording including recent commissions from David Bednall, David Halls and Philip Stopford.

St Matthew's is also a concert venue for Northampton. The church is home to the Northampton Bach Choir, founded by Denys Pouncey in 1935, which for many years had St Matthew's director of music as its director. The church also has links with the Northampton Music and Performing Arts Trust, the Northampton Philharmonic Choir, the Northampton Chamber Choir and many other groups. St Matthew's also houses a four-manual and pedal organ built by J. W. Walker & Sons Ltd in 1895. Regular organ recitals take place.

=== List of organists ===
Many of the previous St Matthew's Directors of Music have gone on to hold important positions in Church Music. These have included King's College, Cambridge, Wells Cathedral, Norwich Cathedral, Blackburn Cathedral, Llandaff Cathedral, York Minster, and the Cathedral of Saint John the Divine, New York City.

- Charles John King 1895 – 1934
- Denys Pouncey 1934 – 1936
- Philip Pfaff 1936 – 1945
- Alec Wyton 1946 – 1950
- Robert Henry Joyce 1950 – 1958
- John Bertalot 1958 – 1964
- Michael Nicholas 1964 – 1971
- Stephen Cleobury 1971 – 1974
- Timothy Day 1974 – 1976
- David Ponsford 1976 – 1979
- Derek Gillard 1979 – 1985
- Andrew Shenton 1986 – 91
- Andrew King 1991 – 1998
- Ian Frank Clarke 1998 – 2001
- John Malcolm Tyler 2001 – 2004 (Music Coordinator)
- Jonathan Starmer (Acting Director of Music) January – September 2005
- Sebastian Thomson 2005 – 2009
- Ben Horden 2009 – 2010
- Jonathan Starmer & Ben Drouet (Acting Directors of Music) September – December 2010
- Stephen Moore 2010 – 2016
- Simon Toyne (Acting Director of Music) September – December 2016
- Justin Miller 2017 – 2022
- Thomas Moore 2022 –

=== Musical commissions ===
A list of musical commissions of St Matthew's Church is here below:

- 1943 – Benjamin Britten – Rejoice in the Lamb
- 1943 – Michael Tippett – Fanfare No 1 for 10 Brass Instruments
- 1944 – Edmund Rubbra – The Revival
- 1945 – Lennox Berkeley – Festival Anthem
- 1946 – Gerald Finzi – Lo, the full, final sacrifice
- 1946 – Benjamin Britten – Prelude and Fugue on a Theme of Vittoria
- 1948 – Christopher Headington – Festival Anthem: Supreme Bliss
- 1949 – John Rose – Festival Hymn
- 1950 – Malcolm Arnold – Laudate Dominum
- 1954 – James Butt – Bless the Lord
- 1956 – David Barlow – Who shall ascend the hill of the Lord
- 1958 – George Dyson – Hail universal Lord
- 1959 – Elizabeth Poston – Festal Te Deum
- 1960 – Peter Dickinson – Justus Quidem Tu Es, Domine
- 1962 – Brian Judge – Ambrosian Prayer
- 1964 – Christopher Le Fleming – Communion Service in D
- 1965 – Kenneth Leighton – Let all the world in every corner sing
- 1966 – John McCabe – A Hymne to God the Father
- 1967 – Richard Rodney Bennett – Five Christmas Carols
- 1968 – Gordon Crosse – The Covenant of the Rainbow
- 1968 – Herbert Howells – One thing have I desired of the Lord
- 1968 – Robert Walker – Fanfare
- 1973 – William Mathias – Missa Brevis
- 1977 – Sebastian Forbes – Quam Dilecta
- 1983 – Philip Moore – At the round earth's imagined corners
- 1986 – Herbert Sumsion – The spacious firmament on high
- 1987 – Geoffrey Burgon – The song of the creatures
- 1988 – John Tavener – The Call
- 1988 – Simon Lole – Carol for Advent
- 1989 – Richard Shephard – St Matthew's Mass
- 1989 – Alan Ridout – Toccata
- 1989 – Ivan Moody – Canticle of Simeoon
- 1990 – Paul Edwards – God that madest heaven and earth
- 1990 – Trevor Hold – Verses from St Matthew
- 1991 – Alec Wyton – A Prayer for Church Musicians and Artists
- 1993 – Diana Burrell – Heil'ger Geist in's Himmels Throne
- 2008 – David Briggs – Toccata for St Matthew's Day
- 2009 – David Bednall – The Walter Hussey Centenary Mass (with motet, Aspire to God, my soul)
- 2012 – Paul Mealor – How beautiful on the mountains
- 2013 – David Halls – Mass of the Altar of Life (with motet, This is the Day)
- 2014 – Philip Stopford – O how glorious is the Kingdom
- 2016 – Simon Johnson – Behold, the tabernacle of God
- 2016 – David Maw – Allein nach dir, Herr (part of the Orgelbüchlein Project)
- 2017 – James Davy – Introit for a Feast Day
- 2017 – James Whitbourn – Beatus vir
- 2018 – Grayston Ives – All people that on earth do dwell
- 2020 – Robert Walker – A Little Organ Mass of the Angels

== See also ==
- List of churches in Northampton
