= Populo =

Popolo may refer to:

- Defensio pro Populo Anglicano, a Latin polemic by John Milton.
- Missa Pro Populo, a term used in liturgical texts and rules of the Catholic Church.
- Nossa Senhora do Pópulo, one of the sixteen civil parishes that make up the municipality of Caldas da Rainha, Portugal.
- Populo Church, a Neoclassical church located in Braga, Portugal.
- Populo shipwreck, listed on the National Register of Historic Places in Miami-Dade County, Florida.
