= Walter Hussey =

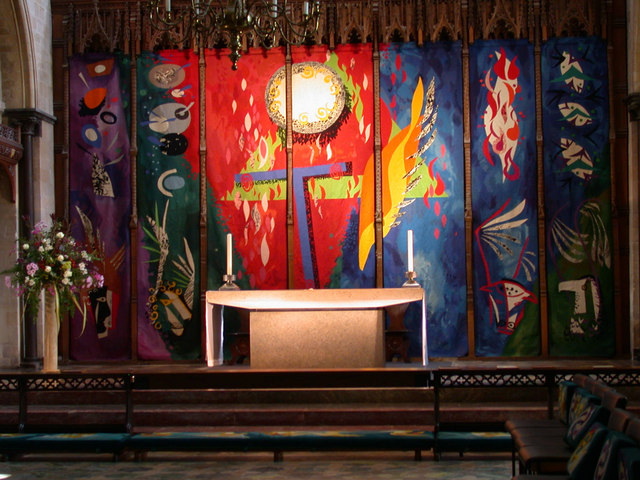
John Piper's tapestry commissioned by Hussey for Chichester Cathedral

John Walter Atherton Hussey (15 May 1909 – 25 July 1985) was an English priest of the Church of England who had a great fondness for the arts, commissioning a number of musical compositions and visual art for the church as well as amassing his own collection.

== Biography ==
Walter Hussey, as he was known, was born on 15 May 1909 in Northampton, the younger son of Canon John Rowden Hussey and his wife Lilian. John Hussey was then vicar of St Matthew's Church, Northampton, a living which he had held since the church was built in 1893. As a small boy Walter attended The Knoll, a preparatory school at Woburn Sands, from where he won a foundation scholarship to Marlborough College in 1922. In 1927 he went up to Keble College, Oxford to read Philosophy, Politics and Economics, obtaining his BA in 1930. Before entering Cuddesdon Theological College in July 1931 he spent some time as a schoolmaster at Charleston, a preparatory school in Seaford, Sussex.

After his ordination Hussey became curate of the church of St Mary Abbots, Kensington until 1937, during which time he was in charge of the daughter church of St Paul, Kensington, from 1935 to 1936. He then succeeded his father as vicar of St Matthew's, Northampton, a position he held until 1955. In his book, Patron of Art, Hussey wrote "Perhaps my succeeding him may suggest nepotism, but I don't think it was. I was not anxious to go there; it seemed that there was little one could do but let the parish down ... my various authorities advised me that it was right that I should go."

During his school and university years Hussey had shown an interest in the arts, music, drama, painting and sculpture. His years in London gave him the opportunity of seeing and hearing much that the city had to offer in its concert halls, theatres and art galleries, and he began to take an increasing interest in contemporary art. It became a cause of regret to him to realise how little of this work was being encouraged by the Church. As he later wrote, "the arts had become largely divorced from the Church".

By the time Hussey became vicar of St Matthew's he was already making plans to bring about a rapprochement between the Church and the arts. An early opportunity presented itself as he starting planning the forthcoming golden jubilee celebrations due to take place at St Matthew's in 1943. He had already had the experience of making arrangements for such a jubilee at St Paul's, Kensington, but now he wanted to incorporate a modern musical work into the festival service.

As vicar of St Matthew's he celebrated the church's 50th anniversary with a sequence of events and commissions: the commission of the anthem Rejoice in the Lamb from Benjamin Britten; a performance from the BBC Symphony Orchestra (2 October 1943); an organ recital by George Thalben-Ball, and (although it was not completed until 1944), the commission of Henry Moore's sculpture Madonna and Child.

Buoyed by the success of the 1943–44 commissions (which attracted national and international media attention), Hussey continued to commission new works of art. Other musical commissions included The Revival by Edmund Rubbra (1944); Festival Anthem by Lennox Berkeley (1945), Lo, the full, final sacrifice from Gerald Finzi (1946), and works by Christopher Headington, Malcolm Arnold and others. There were commissions of poetry: a Litany and Anthem for St Matthew's Day from W. H. Auden and The Outer Planet from Norman Nicholson. Facing the Moore Madonna across the church is Crucifixion (1946) from Graham Sutherland. The tradition of recitals continued throughout this time, most notably with two concerts by the singer Kirsten Flagstad

When Hussey left Northampton in 1955 to become Dean of Chichester Cathedral he had known George Bell, Bishop of Chichester for many years and knew that they shared the same attitude to art and the Church. Consequently, the work he had begun in St Matthew's continued almost uninterrupted in the cathedral. Among his commissions for Chichester were several works of visual art: the altarpiece "Noli me tangere" (1961) by Graham Sutherland, a tapestry by John Piper, a new pulpit and other metalwork by Geoffrey Clarke, a painting by Cecil Collins, textiles by Ceri Richards, and stained glass by Marc Chagall, Hussey's final commission (1978).

Among numerous works of new music for Chichester, the ones with the highest profile were Leonard Bernstein's Chichester Psalms and the 1975 Chichester Service by William Walton.

By the time Hussey retired from Chichester in 1977 to live in London he had acquired an important and varied collection of his own. He offered to leave the greater part of it to the city which he had done so much to promote as a centre of the arts. Like many others he was concerned about the neglect into which Pallant House, a fine example of eighteenth-century domestic architecture, had fallen and, as Dr K. M. E. Murray wrote "his generous offer ... was made deliberately as a means of securing the restoration of the house and its opening to the public". In 1982 Hussey was present at the official opening of the house and saw his paintings and other works of art displayed in the same informal domestic setting as they had been at the deanery where he had taken so much pleasure in showing them to friends and strangers alike.

In his entry in Who's Who, Hussey gave his sole recreation as "enjoying the arts". This enjoyment, not just of the arts, but of all aspects of his life, shines through the archive of his papers and through the enduring legacy of his life and work, in Chichester Cathedral and at Pallant House, the Chichester gallery that opened in 1982 to inherit and show his personal collection.

Hussey finished writing his book Patron of the Arts - The Revival of a Great Tradition Among Modern Artists which was published in 1985 and a documentary about his life, Patron of the Arts, was written and presented by Robert Walker and directed by Christopher Swann. It was broadcast on BBC2 shortly after his death in London on 25 July 1985. His funeral service was conducted at St Paul's Church, Knightsbridge, and a memorial service was held in Chichester Cathedral in October of that year.

Hussey's own collection of art was bequeathed to the City of Chicester and is now housed in Pallant House Gallery.

Church of England titles
Preceded by Arthur Duncan-Jones	Dean of Chichester; 1955 – 1977	Succeeded by Robert Holtby
