= Team of priests in solidum =

Canon law of the Catholic Church

In 1983 the Catholic Church introduced the possibility of entrusting the pastoral care of one or more parishes to a team of priests in solidum. This provision in the 1983 Code of Canon Law, which resembles ancient models of pastoral care in the Roman titular churches with their colleges of priests, was introduced to help resolve some of the difficulties facing many dioceses. These difficulties include shortages of priests, overpopulated urban parishes, depleted and scattered rural parishes, and decline in attendance at Mass. This model of pastoral care is viewed as a practical way of promoting pastoral co-responsibility, as well as fostering a greater sense of the presbyterium among the priests of a diocese.

== Establishment ==
Canon 517 § 1 of the 1983 Code of Canon Law, provides a generic norm for constituting a team of priests to look after one or more parishes; ubi adiuncta id requirant (when circumstances require it), which concedes flexibility to the diocesan bishop in organising the structures for pastoral care within his diocese: "When circumstances require it, the pastoral care of a parish or of different parishes together can be entrusted to several priests in solidum, with the requirement, however, that in exercising pastoral care one of them must be the moderator, namely, the one who is to direct the joint action and to answer for it to the bishop." However, the Codifying Commission responsible for drafting the canons on in solidum pastoral care expressed that it should be considered an "exceptional" provision.

== Nature of the team ==
Commentators acknowledge that there is confusion regarding the ecclesiastical office conferred upon the team of priests in solidum. The law entrusts the cura pastoralis (pastoral care) to each member of the team of priests equally. However, the team of priests is not a juridical person. The team is made up of single priests who assume pastoral care simultaneously or conjointly, and are obligated to the majority of duties proper to a parish priest.

It is generally agreed that a single parochial office for the pastoral care of the entrusted parish or parishes is conferred upon all priests in the team. However, the modus procendi (way of proceeding) for exercising the office is only grasped when the juridical principle in solidum is understood. The legal term originates in the Roman law of Obligations; where entering into an in solidum agreement involved a high degree of risk. For if one creditor had received all that was due, or one debtor had paid all, there was no subsequent right of contribution by the others.

Diverse juridical methods were developed as a means of avoiding personal loss from entering into in solidum agreements. Amongst these was the forming of societates (societies) or partnerships which were created by mutual consent and characterised by a binding commitment to fraternitas (fraternity) and established prior to entering into in solidum agreements. The eminent canonist, Eugenio Corecco has suggested that in solidum in the context of parochial care, analogously reflects the diverse but still collective responsibility of all the members of the presbyterium of a particular Church.

== Rights and duties of the moderator ==
When establishing a team of priests in solidum, the diocesan bishop must outline the rights and specific duties of the moderator. The focal point of the moderator's authority within the team of priests is to guarantee that the faithful are assisted by their pastors from the spiritual riches of the Church, especially the word of God and the Sacraments.

The principal role of the moderator is directing the team's common action, holding responsibility for that common action before the diocesan bishop, and directing the exercise of faculties held by all of the team members. The moderator is also entrusted with the juridical representation of the parish or parishes. However, this does not automatically entitle him the administrator of parochial goods, and hence the necessity of a provision of particular law. His relationship to the parochial pastoral and finance councils should also be established in particular law.

== Rights and duties of the priests ==
The diocesan bishop needs to determine what particular qualities are required for this parochial office. It is strongly recommended that the bishop establish with the team, a division of pastoral tasks in a common plan, which should be outlined in each priest's decree of appointment. Questions surrounding the obligation of Residence and Community life also need to be clarified, as well consideration of the in solidum obligation to celebrate the missa pro populo.

Finally, the cessation from ecclesiastical office by any one member of the group in solidum does not render the parochial office vacant.
