= Lox Pratt =

English actor (born 2012)

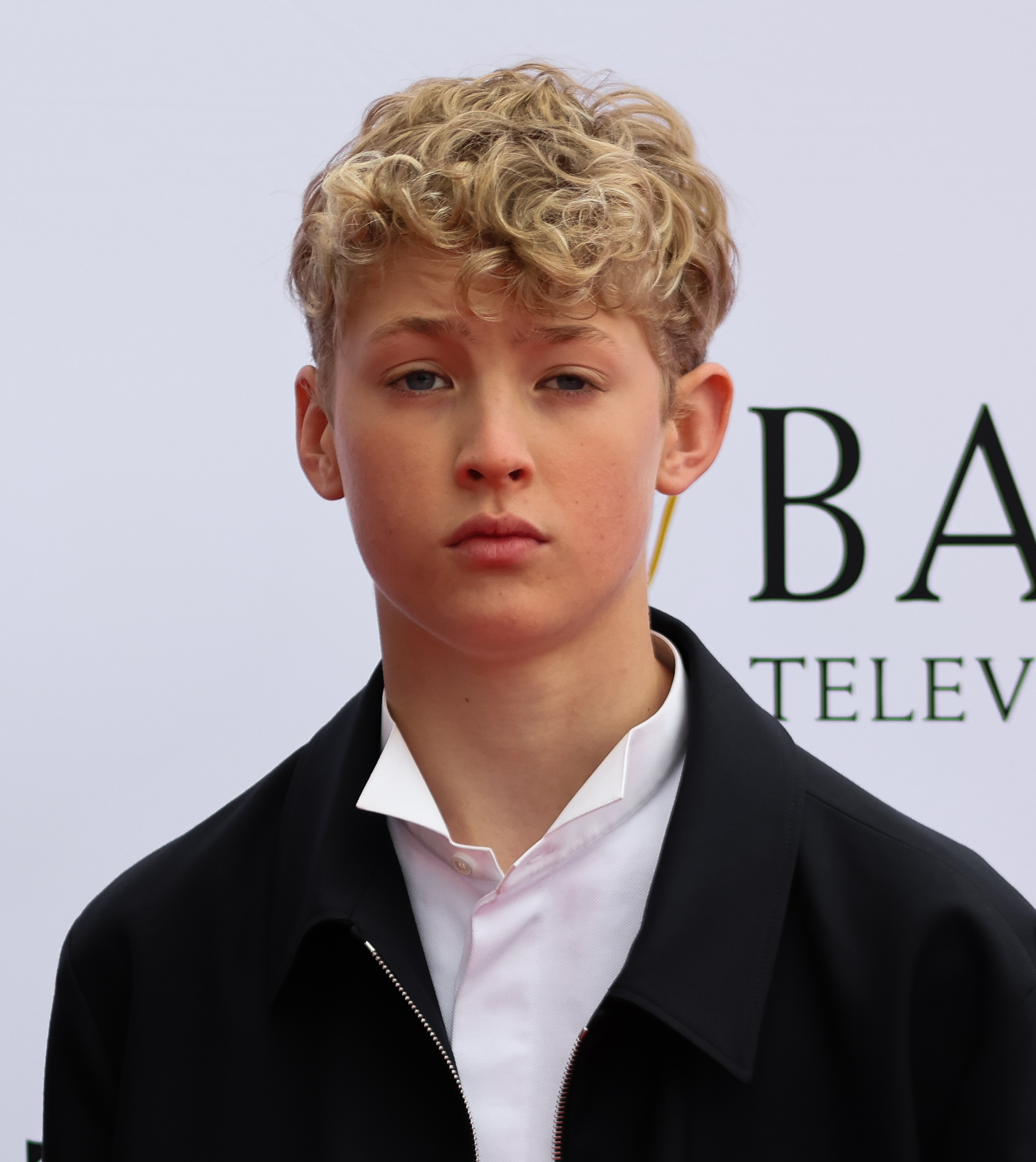
- Pratt at the 2026 British Academy Television Awards
- Born: Lachlan Pratt; 2012; Cornwall, England
- Occupation: Actor
- Years active: 2024–present

Lachlan "Lox" Pratt (born 2012) is an English teen actor. He is best known for playing Jack Merridew in the BBC television adaptation of Lord of the Flies and for being cast as Draco Malfoy in HBO's upcoming Harry Potter television series.

== Career ==
In 2024, Lox Pratt was cast as Jack Merridew in the four-part BBC One and BBC iPlayer adaptation of Lord of the Flies, written by Jack Thorne and directed by Marc Munden. Filming took place in Malaysia. The series premiered in February 2026 and received positive critical reviews, with praise directed at its performances and contemporary reworking of William Golding's novel.

In June 2025, HBO announced that Pratt would play Draco Malfoy in its upcoming television adaptation of the Harry Potter novel series. Filming was scheduled to begin in summer 2025, ahead of an expected release in 2026.

== Personal life ==
Pratt was born and raised in Cornwall. In interviews, he has spoken about developing an early interest in storytelling, filmmaking, dancing, and writing, which led him to pursue acting from a young age.

He joined a local drama group and later attended an open casting call, which resulted in his first major television role in Lord of the Flies. Pratt has also expressed an interest in exploring directing and writing in the future.

== Filmography ==
=== Films ===
Year	Title	Role	Notes
2024	Three Blue Boats	Eldest	

=== Television ===
Year	Title	Role	Notes
2026	Lord of the Flies	Jack Merridew	Main cast; BBC One and BBC iPlayer
2026–present	Harry Potter	Draco Malfoy	Television series

=== Documentaries ===
Year	Title	Role	Notes
2026	Finding Harry: The Craft Behind the Magic	Himself	
2026	Making of Lord of the Flies	Himself	
