= Lo, the full, final sacrifice =

Choral anthem

Lo, the full, final sacrifice (Op. 26) is a festival anthem for SATB choir and organ, composed by Gerald Finzi in 1946. The work was commissioned by the Revd Walter Hussey for the 53rd anniversary of the consecration of St Matthew's Church, Northampton. Finzi orchestrated the piece for its performance at the Three Choirs Festival in 1947. Since then it has become a staple of the Anglican choral tradition. Performance time ranges between fourteen and eighteen minutes.

The anthem's text memorializes the celebration of the Eucharist. Finzi assembled the text from two poems of Richard Crashaw (c. 1613–1649), an English poet of the Metaphysical tradition of John Donne and Thomas Traherne. These two poems, Crashaw's "Adoro Te" and "Lauda Sion Salvatorem", themselves constitute poetic translations of Latin hymns by St Thomas Aquinas (c. 1225–1274). Finzi did not set the entirety of both poems; he instead excerpted and re-ordered selected stanzas from Crashaw's original to create a composite text for the work.

The music of the piece adheres to a conservative tonal idiom, albeit one that modulates frequently. The highly sectionalized form follows the stanza divisions of the text, featuring episodes of homophonic textures as well as short stretches of polyphony. The text is set in a syllabic style, except for the melismatic Amen that closes the piece.

== Text ==
Lo, the full, final sacrifice
On which all figures fix’d their eyes,
The ransom’d Isaac, and his ram;
The Manna, and the Paschal lamb.
Jesu Master, just and true!
Our Food, and faithful Shepherd too!

O let that love which thus makes thee
Mix with our low Mortality,
Lift our lean Souls, and set us up
Convictors of thine own full cup,
Coheirs of Saints. That so all may
Drink the same wine; and the same way.

Nor change the Pasture, but the Place
To feed of Thee in thine own Face.
O dear Memorial of that Death
Which lives still, and allows us breath!
Rich, Royal food! Bountiful Bread!
Whose use denies us to the dead!

Live ever Bread of loves, and be
My life, my soul, my surer self to me.
Help Lord, my Faith, my Hope increase;
And fill my portion in thy peace.
Give love for life; nor let my days
Grow, but in new powers to thy name and praise.

Rise, Royal Sion! rise and sing
Thy soul's kind shepherd, thy heart's King.
Stretch all thy powers; call if you can
Harps of heaven to hands of man.
This sovereign subject sits above
The best ambition of thy love.

Lo the Bread of Life, this day's
Triumphant Text provokes thy praise.
The living and life-giving bread,
To the great twelve distributed
When Life, himself, at point to die
Of love, was his own Legacy.

O soft self-wounding Pelican!
Whose breast weeps Balm for wounded man.
All this way bend thy benign flood
To a bleeding Heart that gasps for blood.
That blood, whose least drops sovereign be
To wash my worlds of sins from me.

Come love! Come Lord! and that long day
For which I languish, come away.
When this dry soul those eyes shall see,
And drink the unseal'd source of thee.
When Glory's sun faith's shades shall chase,
And for thy veil give me thy Face.

Amen.
