= Gordon Fergus-Thompson =

English pianist

Gordon Fergus-Thompson FRCM (born 9 March 1952) is an English concert pianist.

== Biography ==
Fergus-Thompson's first piano teacher was Christine Brown, a pupil of Denis Matthews. Subsequently, he became a student of Gordon Green at the Royal Northern College of Music where he studied from 1968 until his graduation in 1973. Later, he studied with Alexis Weissenberg and John Ogdon and was a student of Peter Katin at the Royal College of Music.

Fergus-Thompson made his concert debut concert at the Wigmore Hall in 1976. Two years later he was the recipient of a Calouste Gulbenkian Fellowship. In 1979 he performed the world premiere of William Mathias's Piano Sonata No.2, Op. 46. He performed the premiere of Christopher Headington's Piano Concerto which he recorded in 1997 for an album of Headington's music released just after the composer's death.

Fergus-Thompson has been a professor of piano at the Royal College of Music since 1996. He was awarded a FRCM in May 2010. He has given masterclasses throughout the UK, USA, Australia and the Far East.

Fergus-Thompson has performed as soloist with the Philharmonia Orchestra, English Chamber Orchestra, City of Birmingham Symphony Orchestra, Royal Liverpool Philharmonic, Hallé Orchestra, Bournemouth Symphony Orchestra, the BBC Symphony Orchestra, the Gothenburg Symphony Orchestra and the Residentie Orchestra. Conductors under whose baton he has performed include Evgenii Svetlanov, Jacek Kaspszyk, Sir Edward Downes, Helmut Muller-Bruhl, Moshe Atzmon, David Atherton and Sir Charles Groves. He has performed numerous recitals on BBC Radio 3.

He recorded the complete piano music of Claude Debussy in 1989 for ASV Records in five volumes, which won the MRA Best Instrumental Recording of the Year and a Penguin Guide Rosette, and is regarded by many as one of the best interpretations of Debussy's piano music in the classical music recording industry. It was reissued several times, including a budget release on Brilliant Classics (paired with Paul Crossley's recording of Maurice Ravel's complete piano music), then once again on the same label (lacking the Ravel). In 2018 it was licensed by Eloquence and reissued on a more compact 4-disc set.

ClassicsToday.com described his Debussy as: "the most consistent in quality among modern editions...The pianist's robust, colourful sonority and sensitive phrasing perfectly suit this alluring, atmospheric repertoire". Classical music critic Julian Haylock said (when referring to his interpretation of the Préludes): "Fergus-Thompson's range of tone colour, and control of dynamic and texture are nothing short of transcendental".
