= On the Death of Mr. Crashaw =

1656 poem by Abraham Cowley

- by Abraham Cowley
- First published in: Miscellanies
- Form: Elegy
- Publication date: 1656
- Lines: 74

On the Death of Mr. Crashaw

Poet and Saint! to thee alone are given
The two most sacred names of earth and heaven,
The hard and rarest union which can be
Next that of godhead with humanity.
Long did the Muses banish'd slaves abide,
And built vain pyramids to mortal pride;
Like Moses thou (though spells and charms withstand)
Hast brought them nobly home back to their Holy Land.

Ah wretched we, poets of earth! but thou
Wert living the same poet which thou'rt now.
Whilst angels sing to thee their airs divine,
And joy in an applause so great as thine,
Equal society with them to hold,
Thou need'st not make new songs, but say the old.
And they (kind spirits!) shall all rejoice to see
How little less than they exalted man may be.
Still the old heathen gods in numbers dwell,
The heavenliest thing on earth still keeps up Hell.
Nor have we yet quite purg'd the Christian land;
Still idols here like calves at Bethel stand.
And though Pan's death long since all oracles broke,
Yet still in rhyme the fiend Apollo spoke:
Nay with the worst of heathen dotage we
(Vain men!) the monster Woman deify;
Find stars, and tie our fates there in a face,
And Paradise in them by whom we lost it, place.
What different faults corrupt our Muses thus
Wanton as girls, as old wives fabulous!

Thy spotless Muse, like Mary, did contain
The boundless Godhead; she did well disdain
That her eternal verse employ'd should be
On a less subject than eternity;
And for a sacred mistress scorn'd to take
But her whom God himself scorn'd not his spouse to make.
It (in a kind) her miracle did do;
A fruitful mother was, and virgin too.

How well, blest swan, did fate contrive thy death;
And make thee render up thy tuneful breath
In thy great mistress' arms! thou most divine
And richest offering of Loretto's shrine!
Where like some holy sacrifice t' expire
A fever burns thee, and Love lights the fire.
Angels (they say) brought the fam'd chapel there,
And bore the sacred load in triumph through the air.
'Tis surer much they brought thee there, and they,
And thou, their charge, went singing all the way.

Pardon, my Mother Church, if I consent
That angels led him when from thee he went,
For even in error sure no danger is
When join'd with so much piety as his.
Ah, mighty God, with shame I speak't, and grief,
Ah that our greatest faults were in belief!
And our weak reason were even weaker yet,
Rather than thus our wills too strong for it.
His faith perhaps in some nice tenents might
Be wrong; his life, I'm sure, was in the right.
And I myself a Catholic will be,
So far at least, great saint, to pray to thee.

Hail, bard triumphant! and some care bestow
On us, the poets militant below!
Oppos'd by our old enemy, adverse chance,
Attack'd by envy, and by ignorance,
Enchain'd by beauty, tortured by desires,
Expos'd by tyrant Love to savage beasts and fires.
Thou from low earth in nobler flames didst rise,
And like Elijah, mount alive the skies.
Elisha-like (but with a wish much less,
More fit thy greatness, and my littleness)
Lo here I beg (I whom thou once didst prove
So humble to esteem, so good to love)
Not that thy spirit might on me doubled be,
I ask but half thy mighty spirit for me;
And when my Muse soars with so strong a wing,
'Twill learn of things divine, and first of thee to sing.

—Abraham Cowley

"On the Death of Mr. Crashaw" is an elegy by English poet Abraham Cowley in commemoration of his friend Richard Crashaw's death. First published in 1656, it is considered by literary critics as one of Cowley's greatest poems.

== Synopsis ==
The poem celebrates the life of Richard Crashaw, who is described as "Poet and Saint". The narrator suggests that Crashaw's poems have a heavenly quality. He remarks that his "songs" bring poetry "nobly back to their Holy Land" and that they will be sung with the angel "ayres divine".

== Analysis ==
David Trotter writes that the opening lines single "(Crashaw) out from the throng of profane poets", whereas throughout the rest of the poem, Crashaw's "saintliness" is contrasted with the "weaker—sometimes false—codes" and "relative homelessness" of the narrator. For instance, the narrator expresses his "despair at the single dimension of modern concerns" due to the use of the "weak parenthesis" in "(Vain men!)". N. K. Sugimura suggests that Cowley "may well have been paying homage to how Crashaw's lived appropriation of Counter-Reformation spirituality had succeeded in raising his particular strain of English devotional poetry." The poem also alludes to the Catholic "shrine" in Loretto at which Crashaw worked as a Catholic poet for merely three months before his death; Crashaw had previously been secretary to Italian Cardinal Giovanni Battista Maria Pallotta under the recommendation of Henrietta Maria.

== Publication history ==
Richard Crashaw died on 21 August 1649. According to Cowley's biographer Arthur Nethercot, "On the Death of Mr. Crashaw" was only written some two years after Crashaw's death. It was originally composed on a single sheet of paper measuring 434 by 323 millimetres (17.1 in × 12.7 in); the sheet was folded into half and the poem occupies three of the four pages. The completed elegy was included as the final and most recent poem in Miscellanies, published in 1656.

== Reception ==
The elegy has been considered to be one of Cowley's "finest poems". According to Jelena Krostovic, it is "universally admired for its stately mood". Reportedly one of his "clear personal favourites" among the poems in Miscellanies, Samuel Johnson wrote that it "apparently excels" all the other poems in the collection, adding that it contains "beauties which common authors may justly think not only above their attainment, but above their ambition." John Buxton called the poem "sensitive and judicious".

In Epistle III of An Essay on Man, Alexander Pope denounces religious partisanship. He writes that one "can't be wrong whose life is in the right", alluding to Cowley's "tolerant" comment in "On the Death of Mr. Crashaw" that Crashaw's Catholicism may have "harmlessly diverged" from Cowley's "Mother Church": "His Faith perhaps in some nice Tenets might/Be wrong; his Life, I'm sure, was in the right".
