= Richard Crashaw =

English poet and cleric (c.1613 – 1649)

The Reverend Richard Crashaw
- Born: c. 1612–1613; London, England
- Died: 21 August 1649 (aged 36); Loreto, March of Ancona, Papal States
- Education: Pembroke College, Cambridge
- Occupations: poet, teacher
- Writing career
- Notable works: Epigrammaticum Sacrorum Liber (1634); Steps to the Temple (1646); Delights of the Muses (1648); Carmen Deo Nostro (1652)
- Literary movement: Metaphysical poets

Richard Crashaw (c. 1613 – 21 August 1649) was an English poet, teacher, High Church Anglican cleric and Roman Catholic convert, who was one of the major metaphysical poets in 17th-century English literature.

Crashaw was the son of a famous Anglican divine with Puritan beliefs, William Crashaw, who earned a reputation as a hard-hitting pamphleteer and polemicist against Catholicism. After his father's death, Crashaw was educated at Charterhouse School and Pembroke College, Cambridge. After taking a degree, Crashaw taught as a fellow at Peterhouse, Cambridge and began to publish religious poetry that expressed a distinct mystical nature and an ardent Christian faith.

Crashaw was ordained as a clergyman in the Church of England and in his theology and practice embraced the High Church reforms of Archbishop Laud. Crashaw became infamous among English Puritans for his use of Christian art to decorate his church, for his devotion to the Virgin Mary, for his use of Catholic vestments, and for many other reasons. During these years, however, the University of Cambridge was a hotbed for High Church Anglicanism and for Royalist sympathies. Adherents of both positions were violently persecuted by Puritan forces during and after the English Civil War (1642–1651).

When Puritan General Oliver Cromwell seized control of the city in 1643, Crashaw was ejected from his parish and fellowship and became a refugee, first in France and then in the Papal States. He found employment as an attendant to Cardinal Giovanni Battista Maria Pallotta at Rome. While in exile he converted from Anglicanism to Roman Catholicism. In April 1649, Cardinal Pallotta appointed Crashaw to a minor benefice as canon of the Shrine of the Holy House at Loreto where he died suddenly four months later.

Crashaw's poetry, although often categorised with those of the contemporary English metaphysical poets, exhibits similarities with the Baroque poets and influenced in part by the works of Italian and Spanish mystics. It draws parallels "between the physical beauties of nature and the spiritual significance of existence". His work is said to be marked by a focus toward "love with the smaller graces of life and the profounder truths of religion, while he seems forever preoccupied with the secret architecture of things".

== Biography ==
=== Early life ===
==== Parents ====
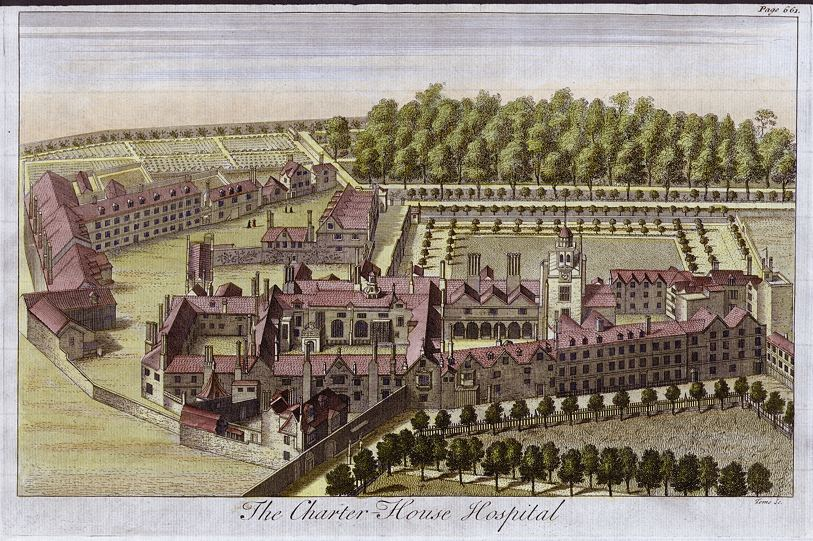
Thomas Sutton bequeathed money to maintain a chapel, hospital, and school at the London Charterhouse, a former Carthusian monastery, where Crashaw studied from 1629 to 1631.

Richard Crashaw was born in London, England, circa 1612 or 1613. He was the only son of William Crashaw. The exact date of Richard Crashaw's birth and the name of his mother are unknown; it is believed that he was born either in late 1612 or in January 1613. His mother, William Crashaw's first wife, may have died while he was an infant. William Crashaw's second wife, Elizabeth Skinner, whom he married in 1619, died in 1620 in childbirth. Richard Crashaw may have been baptised by James Ussher, later the Archbishop of Armagh.

William Crashaw was a Cambridge-educated clergyman who served as a preacher at London's Inner Temple. He was born in or near Handsworth in the West Riding of Yorkshire, and came from a wealthy family. William Crashaw wrote and published many pamphlets advocating Puritan theology that were sharply critical of Catholicism. Despite his opposition to Catholic thought, William Crashaw was attracted by Catholic devotion; he translated many verses by Catholic poets from Latin to English. According to Cornelius Clifford, William Crashaw was

"a man of unchallenged repute for learning in his day, an argumentative but eloquent preacher, strong in his Protestantism, and fierce in his denunciation of 'Romish falsifications' and 'besotted Jesuitries'".

===== Childhood =====
Scholars believe that as a child, Richard Crashaw read extensively from his father's private library. It contained many Catholic works and was described as "one of the finest private theological libraries of the time". The Crashaw library included works such as Bernard of Clairvaux's Sermons on the Song of Songs, the life of Catherine of Siena, the Revelations of Saint Bridget, and the writings of Richard Rolle.

With the death of William Crashaw in 1626, Richard Crashaw became an orphan at 13 or 14 years old. English attorney general, Sir Henry Yelverton and Sir Ranulph Crewe, a prominent judge, were appointed as Crashaw's legal guardians.

=== Education ===
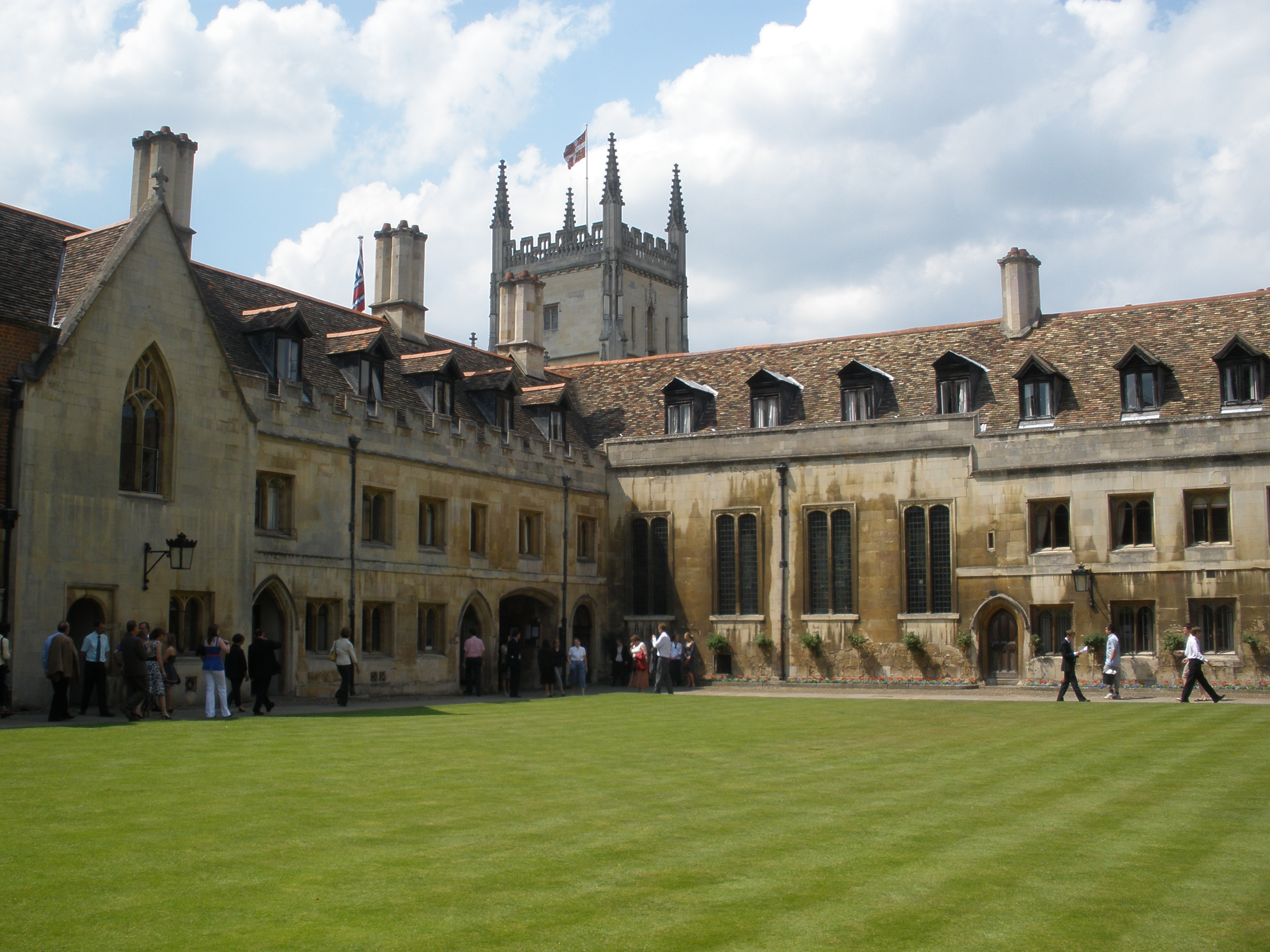
The Old Court at Pembroke College, Cambridge

==== Charterhouse School ====
Crashaw's guardians sent him to the Charterhouse School in 1629. At Charterhouse, Crashaw was a pupil of the school's headmaster, Robert Brooke. He required his students to write epigrams and verse in Greek and Latin based on the Epistle and Gospel readings from the day's chapel services. Crashaw later continued this exercise as an undergraduate at Cambridge. Several years later, he assembled many these epigrams for his first collection of poems, Epigrammatum Sacrorum Liber (trans. "A Book of Sacred Epigrams"), published in 1634. After finishing at Charterhouse, Crashaw entered Pembroke Hall at the University of Cambridge

==== Pembroke Hall ====
According to clergyman and editor Alexander Grosart, Crashaw was "as thoroughly Protestant, in all probability, as his father could have desired" before his graduation from Pembroke Hall in 1634. During his education, Crashaw gravitated to the High Church tradition in Anglicanism, particularly towards the ideals and ritual practices that emphasised the church's Catholic heritage. These practices were advocated by William Laud, the Archbishop of Canterbury. Laud, with the support of King Charles I, had reoriented the practices of the Church of England with a programme of reforms that sought "beauty in holiness". Laud sought to incorporate "more reverence and decorum in church ceremonial and service, in the decoration of churches, and in the elaboration of the ritual". This movement, called Laudianism, rose out of the influence of the Counter-Reformation. The University of Cambridge was a centre of the Laudian movement at the time of Crashaw's attendance.

Richard Crashaw matriculated as a scholar at Pembroke on 26 March 1632. At that time, the college's master was the Reverend Benjamin Lany, an Anglican clergyman and friend of William Crashaw. Early in his career, Lany shared many of William Crashaw's Puritan beliefs. However, Lany's beliefs evolved toward more High Church practices. It is likely that Richard Crashaw was under Lany's influence while at Pembroke. Crashaw was acquainted with Nicholas Ferrar and participated in his Little Gidding community, a family religious group. Little Gidding was noted for its adherence to High Church rituals centred around Ferrar's model of a humble spiritual life of devoted to prayer and eschewing material, worldly life. Little Gidding was criticised by its Puritan detractors as a "Protestant Nunnery".

Pembroke Hall conferred on Crashaw a Bachelor of Arts degree in 1634. This degree was promoted to a Master of Arts in 1638 by Cambridge, and through incorporation ad eundem gradum by the University of Oxford in 1641.

=== High Churchman and Cambridge fellow ===
==== Curate in Cambridge ====
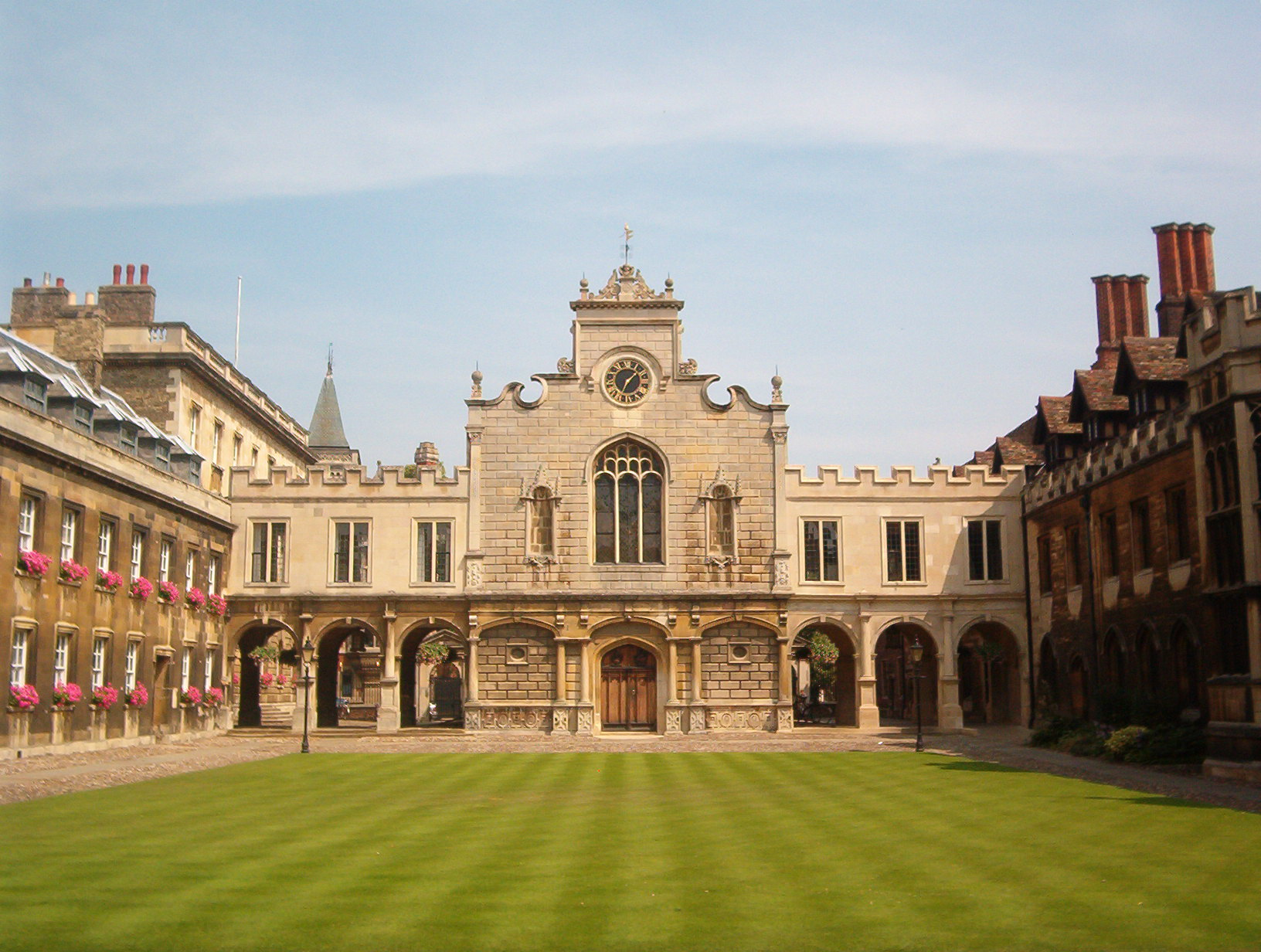
The Old Court at Peterhouse, Cambridge, the oldest constituent college of the university, which Crashaw described as "a little contentfull kingdom"

In 1636, Crashaw was elected a fellow of Peterhouse at Cambridge. In 1638, he was ordained into the priesthood of the Church of England, and was installed as curate of the Church of St Mary the Less in Cambridge, England This church, commonly known as "Little St Mary's", is adjacent to Peterhouse and had served as the college chapel until 1632.

Peterhouse's Master, John Cosin, and many of the college's fellows, adhered to Laudianism and embraced the Anglican tradition's Catholic heritage. Crashaw became close to the Ferrar family and frequently visited Little Gidding. Crashaw incorporated these influences into his conduct at St Mary the Less. These changes included holding late-night prayer vigils, and adorning the chapel with relics, crucifixes, and images of Mary, mother of Jesus. According to an early Crashaw biographer, David Lloyd, Crashaw attracted many attendees to Little St Mary's who were eager to hear his sermons, "that ravished more like Poems, than both the Poet and Saint ... scattering not so much Sentences as Extasies".

Because of the tensions between Laudian adherents and their Puritan detractors, the Puritans often sent spies to attend church services to identify and gather evidence of "superstitious" or "Popish" idolatry. In 1641, Crashaw was cited for Mariolatry (excessive devotion to the Virgin Mary) and for his superstitious practices of "diverse bowings, cringeings" and incensing before the altar".

==== English Revolution ====
In 1643, Cromwell's forces took control of Cambridge and immediately began to crack down on Catholic influences. Crashaw was forced to resign his fellowship at Peterhouse for refusing to sign the Solemn League and Covenant. He soon decided to leave England, accompanied by Mary Collet, whom he revered as his "gratious mother". He arranged for Mary's son, Collete Ferrer, to take over his fellowship at Peterhouse. Soon after Crashaw left Cambridge, St Mary's was ransacked on 29 and 30 December 1643 by William Dowsing under orders from the Parliamentarian commanders. Dowsing recording that at Little St Mary's "we brake downe 60 superstitious pictures, some popes, and crucifixes, and God the Father sitting in a chayer, and holding a globe in his hand".

Crashaw's poetry took on decidedly Catholic imagery, especially in his poems about Spanish mystic St Teresa of Avila. Teresa's writings were unknown in England and unavailable in English. However, Crashaw had been exposed to her work, and the three poems he wrote in her honor—"A Hymn to Sainte Teresa", "An Apologie for the fore-going Hymne", and "The Flaming Heart"—are, arguably, his most sublime works.

Crashaw began writing poems influenced by the George Herbert's collection The Temple—an influence likely derived from Herbert's connection to Nicholas Ferrar. Several of these poems Crashaw later collected in a series titled Steps to the Temple and The Delights of the Muses by an anonymous friend and published in one volume in 1646. This collection included Crashaw's translation of Giambattista Marini's Sospetto d'Herode. In his preface, the collection's anonymous editor described the poems as having the potential to induce a considerable effect on the reader—it would "lift thee Reader, some yards above the ground." According to contemporary accounts, Crashaw's sermons on this subject were powerful and well-attended, but no records of them exist today.

=== Exile, conversion, and death ===
==== Conversion to Catholicism ====
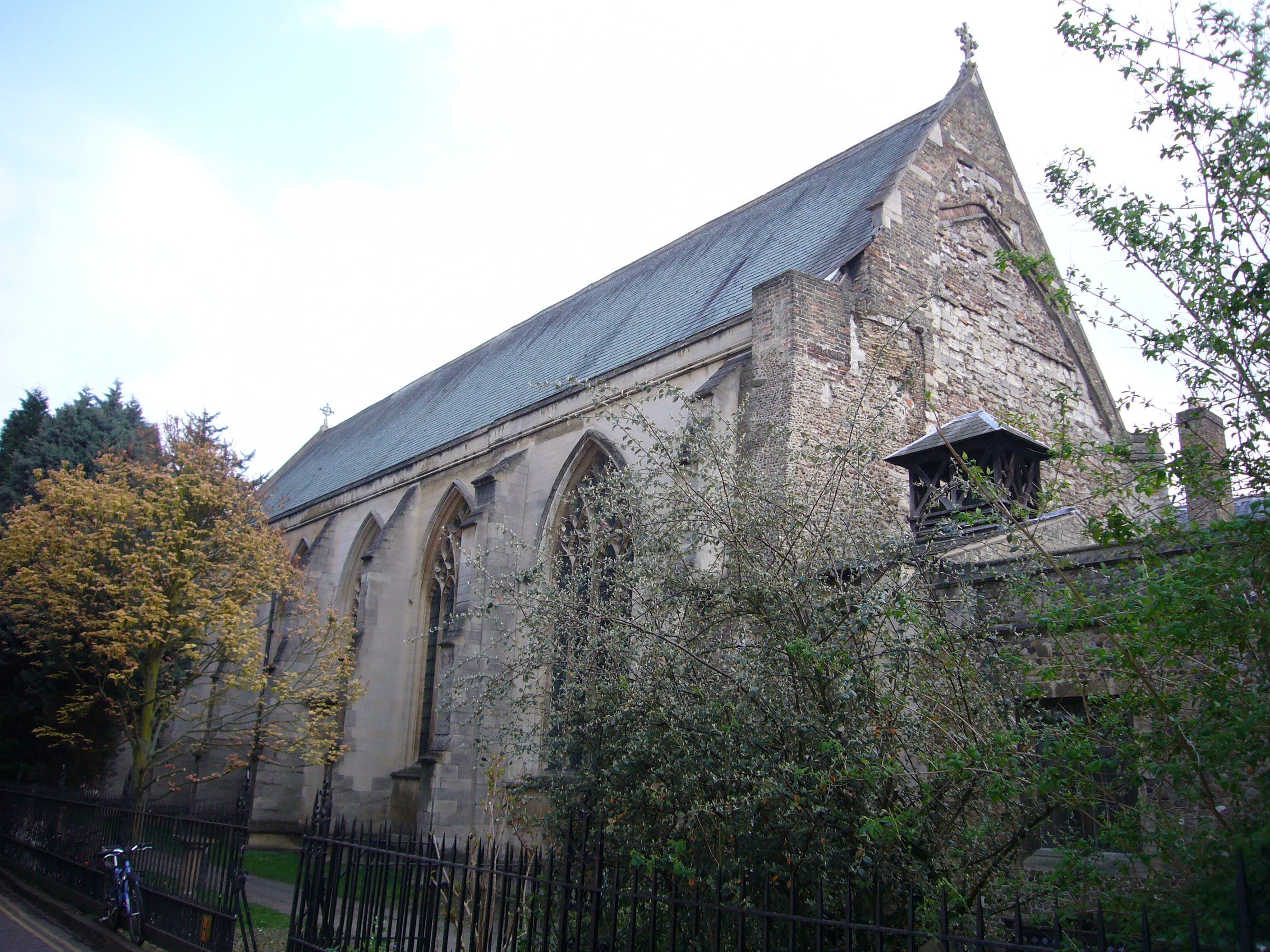
Little St Mary's, Cambridge

In 1644, Crashaw and Collet settled in Leiden in the Netherlands. It is believed that he converted from Anglicanism to Catholicism at this time. According to the Athanae Oxoniensis (1692), antiquarian Anthony à Wood explains the reasoning for Crashaw's conversion as the result of fearing the destruction of his beloved religion by the Puritans: "an infallible foresight that the Church of England would be quite ruined by the unlimited fury of the Presbyterians". However, according to Husain,

It was not the Roman Catholic dogma, or philosophy, but the Catholic ritual and the reading of the Catholic mystics, especially St. Teresa, which largely led him to seek repose in the bosom of the Catholic Church. Crashaw's conversion was the confirmation of a spiritual state which had already existed, and this state was mainly emotional, an artistic abandonment to the ecstasy of divine love expressed through sensuous symbolism.

At some point in 1645, Crashaw appeared in Paris, where he encountered Reverend Thomas Car a confessor to English refugees. The poet's vagrant existence made a lasting impression on Car, as shown by "The Anagramme":

He seeks no downes, no sheetes, his bed's still made.
If he can find a chaire or stoole, he's layd,
When day peepes in, he quitts his restlesse rest.
And still, poore soule, before he's up he's dres't.

==== Final years ====
The writer Abraham Cowley discovered Crashaw living in abject poverty in Paris. Cowley sought help from English Queen Henrietta Maria, herself in exile in France, to help Crashaw secure a position in Rome. Crashaw's friend and patron, Susan Feilding, Countess of Denbigh, also lobbied the Queen to recommend Crashaw to Pope Innocent X.

Crashaw travelled as a pilgrim to Rome in November 1646. He lived there in poor health and poverty while waiting for a papal retainer. Crashaw was finally introduced to Innocent X, being called "the learned son of a famous Heretic". According to Sabine, the Puritans who forced Crashaw into exile would have described him also as the heretical son of a learned performer. After repeated lobbying by the Queen, Innocent X finally granted Crashaw in 1647 a post with Cardinal Giovanni Battista Maria Pallotta, who was closely associated with the English College, a seminary in Rome. Crashaw was allowed to reside at the college.

At the college, Crashaw witnessed immoral behaviour from some of Pallotta's entourage and reported them to the Cardinal. This action created such bitter enemies for Crashaw that Pallotta eventually removed him from the college for his own safety. In April 1649, Pallotta found a cathedral benefice for Crashaw at the Basilica della Santa Casa at Loreto, Marche. Crashaw left for Loreto in May 1649.

Weakened by years of privatation, Crashaw died in Loreto of a fever on 21 August 1649. There were suspicions that Crashaw was poisoned, possibly by his enemies in Pallotta's entourage. Crashaw was buried in the lady chapel of the shrine at Loreto.

== Poetry ==
=== Writing and publication history ===
Three collections of Crashaw's poetry were published during his lifetime and one small volume posthumously—three years after his death. The posthumous collection, Carmen Del Nostro, included 33 poems.

For his first collection of poems, Crashaw turned to the epigrams composed during his schooling, assembling these efforts to form the core of his first book, Epigrammatum Sacrorum Liber (trans. "A Book of Sacred Epigrams"), published in 1634. Among its well-known lines is Crashaw's observation on the miracle of turning water into wine: Nympha pudica Deum vidit, et erubuit, believed to be translated by Crashaw himself as: "The conscious water saw its God and blushed". (Note: The literal translation is "[The] chaste nymph saw God, and blushed".)

For instance, this quatrain, titled Dominus apud suos vilis from the collection, was based on a passage from the Gospel of Luke:

Crashaw's epigram (1634)

III.
En consanguinei! Patriis en exul in oris
Christus! et haud alibi tam peregrinus erat.
Qui socio demum pendebat sanguine latro,
O consanguineus quam fuit ille magis.

Clement Barksdale's translation (1873)

III.
See, O Kinsman, what strange thing is this!
Christ in's own country a great stranger is.
The thief which bled upon the Cross with Thee
Was more ally'd in consanguinity.

A literal translation

III.
Behold kinsmen! He who was an exile in his homeland—
The Christ, who was as a stranger there and not so elsewhere.
He, the thief who bled at the end, hanging with him—
Oh!—he was closer a blood relation.

=== Themes ===
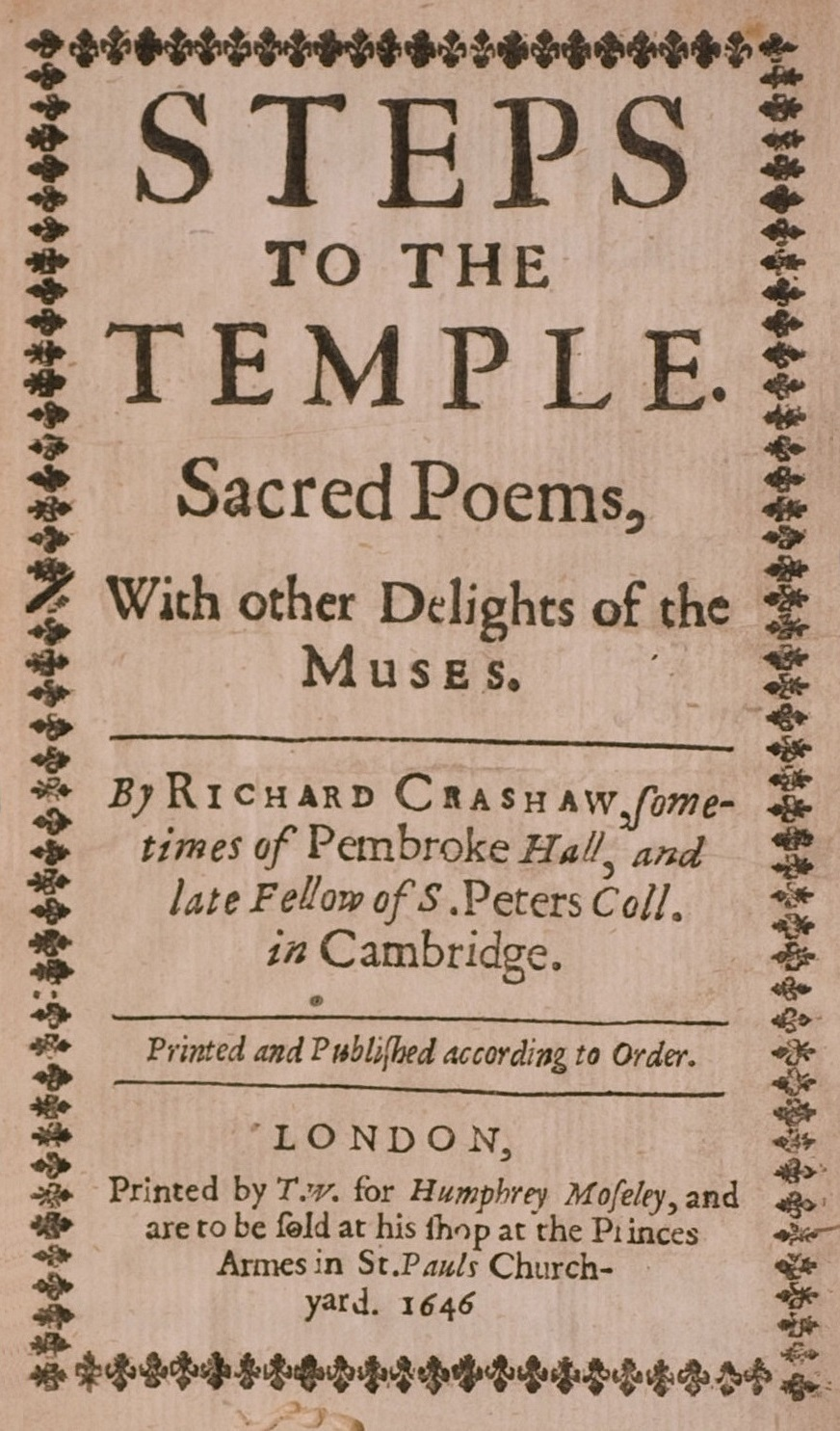
Title page of Crashaw's Steps to the Temple (1646) which was published during Crashaw's exile

Crashaw's work has as its focus the devotional pursuit of divine love. According to literary historian Maureen Sabine, his poems "reveal new springs of tenderness as he became absorbed in a Laudian theology of love, in the religious philanthropy practiced by his Pembroke master, Benjamin Laney, and preached by his tutor, John Tournay, and in the passionate poetic study of the Virgin Mother and Christ Child". Sabine asserts that as a result of his Marian devotion and Catholic sensibilities,

In expressing his Christian love for all men, even the archenemy of his father and most English Protestants, Crashaw began to feel what it was like for Christ to be a stranger in his own land.

He depicts women, most notably the Virgin Mary, but also Teresa and Mary Magdalene, as the embodiment of virtue, purity and salvation. Indeed, Crashaw's three poems in honour of the saint Teresa of Avila—"A Hymn to Sainte Teresa", "An Apologie for the fore-going Hymne", and "The Flaming Heart"—are considered his most sublime works. According to Sabine,

In his finest contemplative verse, he would reach out from the evening stillness of the sanctuary to an embattled world that was deaf to the soothing sound of Jesus, the name which, to his mind, cradled the cosmos.

According to Husain, Crashaw is not a mystic—and not by traditional definitions of mysticism—he is simply a devotee who had a mystic temperament because he "often appears to us as an ecstatic poet writing about the mystical experiences of a great saint (St. Teresa) rather than conveying the richness of his own mystical experience. Husain continued to categorise Crashaw's poems into four topic areas:

- (1) poems on Christ's life and His miracles;
- (2) poems on the Catholic Church and its ceremonies;
- (3) poems on the saints and martyrs of the Church; and
- (4) poems on several sacred themes such as the translation of the Psalms, and letters to the Countess of Denbigh, and "On Mr. George Herbert's book intituled, The Temple of Sacred Poems sent to a Gentlewoman", which contain Crashaw's reflections on the problem of conversion and on the efficacy of prayer.

While Crashaw is categorised as one of the metaphysical poets, his poetry differs from those of the other metaphysical poets by its cosmopolitan and continental influences. As a result of this eclectic mix of influences, Sabine states that Crashaw is usually

regarded as the incongruous younger brother of the Metaphysicals who weakens the 'strong line' of their verse or the prodigal son who 'took his journey into a far country', namely the Continent and Catholicism.

Lorraine M. Roberts writes Crashaw "happily set out to follow in the steps of George Herbert" with the influence of The Temple (1633), and that "confidence in God's love prevails in his poetry and marks his voice as distinctly different from that of Donne in relation to sin and death and from that of Herbert in his struggle to submit his will to that of God."

=== Critical reception ===
Much of the negative criticism of Crashaw's work stems from an anti-Catholic sentiment in English letters—especially among critics who claim that his verse suffered as a result of his religious conversion. Conversely, the Protestant poet Abraham Cowley memorialised Crashaw in an elegy, expressing a conciliatory opinion of Crashaw's Catholic character.

Today, Crashaw's work is largely unknown and unread— if he is not the "most important" he is certainly one of the most distinguished of the metaphysical poets. Crashaw's poetry has inspired or directly influenced the work of many poets in his own day, and throughout the eighteenth, nineteenth, and twentieth centuries.

According to literary scholars Lorraine Roberts and John Roberts, "those critics who expressed appreciation for Crashaw's poetry were primarily impressed not with its thought, but with its music and what they called 'tenderness and sweetness of language'"—including a roster of writers such as Samuel Taylor Coleridge, William Wordsworth, Elizabeth Barrett Browning, Ralph Waldo Emerson, Henry Wadsworth Longfellow, Amy Lowell, and A. Bronson Alcott. During and after his life, friends and poets esteemed Crashaw as a saint—Abraham Cowley called him such in his elegy "On the Death of Mr. Crashaw" (1656); and Sir John Beaumont's poem "Psyche" (1648) compares Crashaw with fourth-century poet and saint Gregory of Nazianzen. Others referred to him in comparison with George Herbert, as "the other Herbert" or "the second Herbert of our late times".

"His faith, perhaps, in some nice tenets might
Be wrong; his life, I'm sure, was in the right:
And I, myself, a Catholic will be,
So far at least, dear saint, to pray to thee"

== Legacy ==
=== Crashaw Prize ===
The Crashaw Prize was awarded by Salt Publishing from 2008 until at least 2013. The prize gave the opportunity for debut poets to have their first collections of poetry published in Australia, the UK, and the US.

=== Later plagiarism ===
Alexander Pope judged Crashaw "a worse sort of Cowley", adding that "Herbert is lower than Crashaw, Sir John Beaumont higher, and Donne, a good deal so." Pope first identified the influence of Italian poets Petrarch and Giambattista Marino on Crashaw, which he criticised as yielding thoughts "oftentimes far fetch'd and strain'd", but that one could "skim off the froth" to get to Crashaw's "own natural middle-way". However, contemporary critics were quick to point out that Pope owed Crashaw a debt and in several instances, plagiarised from him. In 1785, Peregrine Philips disparaged those who borrowed from and imitated Crashaw without giving proper acknowledgement—singling out Pope, John Milton, Young, and Gray—saying that they "dress themselves in his borrowed robes" Early 20th-century literary critic Austin Warren identified that Pope's The Rape of the Lock borrowed heavily from Crashaw's style and translation of Sospetto d'Herode.

In a 1751 edition of in The Rambler, critic Samuel Johnson called attention to a direct example of Pope's plagiaristic borrowing from Crashaw:

Crashaw's verse:

—This plain floor,
Believe me, reader, can say more
Than many a braver marble can,
Here lies a truly honest man

Pope's plagiarised verse:

This modest stone, what few vain marbles can,
May truly say, Here lies an honest man.

=== Musical settings ===
Crashaw's verse has been set by or inspired musical compositions. Elliott Carter was inspired by Crashaw's Latin poem "Bulla" ("Bubble") to compose his three-movement orchestral work Symphonia: sum fluxae pretium spei (1993–1996). The festival anthem Lo, the full, final sacrifice, Op. 26, composed in 1946 by British composer Gerald Finzi is a setting of two Crashaw poems, "Adoro Te" and "Lauda Sion Salvatorem"—translations by Crashaw of two Latin hymns by Thomas Aquinas. "Come and let us live", a translation by Crashaw of a poem by Roman poet Catullus, was set to music as a four-part choral glee by Samuel Webbe Jr.. Crashaw's "Come Love, Come Lord" was set to music by Ralph Vaughan Williams. "A Song" was set by Kenneth Leighton in his "Lord, When the Sense of Thy Sweet Grace", commissioned by Ampleforth Abbey choir (1977). Excerpts from "In the Holy Nativity of our Lord" were set by American composer Alf Houkom as part of his "A Christmas Meditation" (1986, rev. 2018) for SATB choir, synthesizer and piano. "A Hymn of the Nativity" was set as "Shepherd's Hymn" by American composer Timothy Hoekman in his 1992 set of three songs entitled The Nativity for soprano and orchestra.

== Works ==
"The Recommendation"

These houres, and that which hovers o're my End,
Into thy hands, and hart, lord, I commend.

Take Both to Thine Account, that I and mine
In that Hour, and in these, may be all thine.

That as I dedicate my devoutest Breath
To make a kind of Life for my lord's Death,

So from his living, and life-giving Death,
My dying Life may draw a new, and never fleeting Breath.

- 1634: Epigrammatum Sacrorum Liber (trans. "A Book of Sacred Epigrams")
- 1646: Steps to the Temple. Sacred Poems, With other Delights of the Muses
- 1648: Steps to the Temple, Sacred Poems. With The Delights of the Muses (an expanded second edition)
- 1652: Carmen Deo Nostro (trans. "Hymns to Our Lord", published posthumously)
- 1653: A Letter from Mr. Crashaw to the Countess of Denbigh Against Irresolution and Delay in matters of Religion
- 1670: Richardi Crashawi Poemata et Epigrammata (trans. "Poems and Epigrams of Richard Crashaw")

=== Modern editions ===
- The Complete Works of Richard Crashaw, edited by Alexander B. Grosart, two volumes (London: printed for private circulation by Robson and Sons, 1872 & 1873).
- The Poems, English, Latin, and Greek, of Richard Crashaw edited by L. C. Martin (Oxford: Clarendon Press, 1927); second edition, revised, 1957).
- The Complete Poetry of Richard Crashaw edited by George Walton Williams (Garden City, NY: Doubleday, 1970).

== See also ==
- "On the Death of Mr. Crashaw", an elegy by Crashaw's friend, the poet Abraham Cowley
