= Missa Brevis (Britten) =

1959 mass setting by Benjamin Britten

- by Benjamin Britten
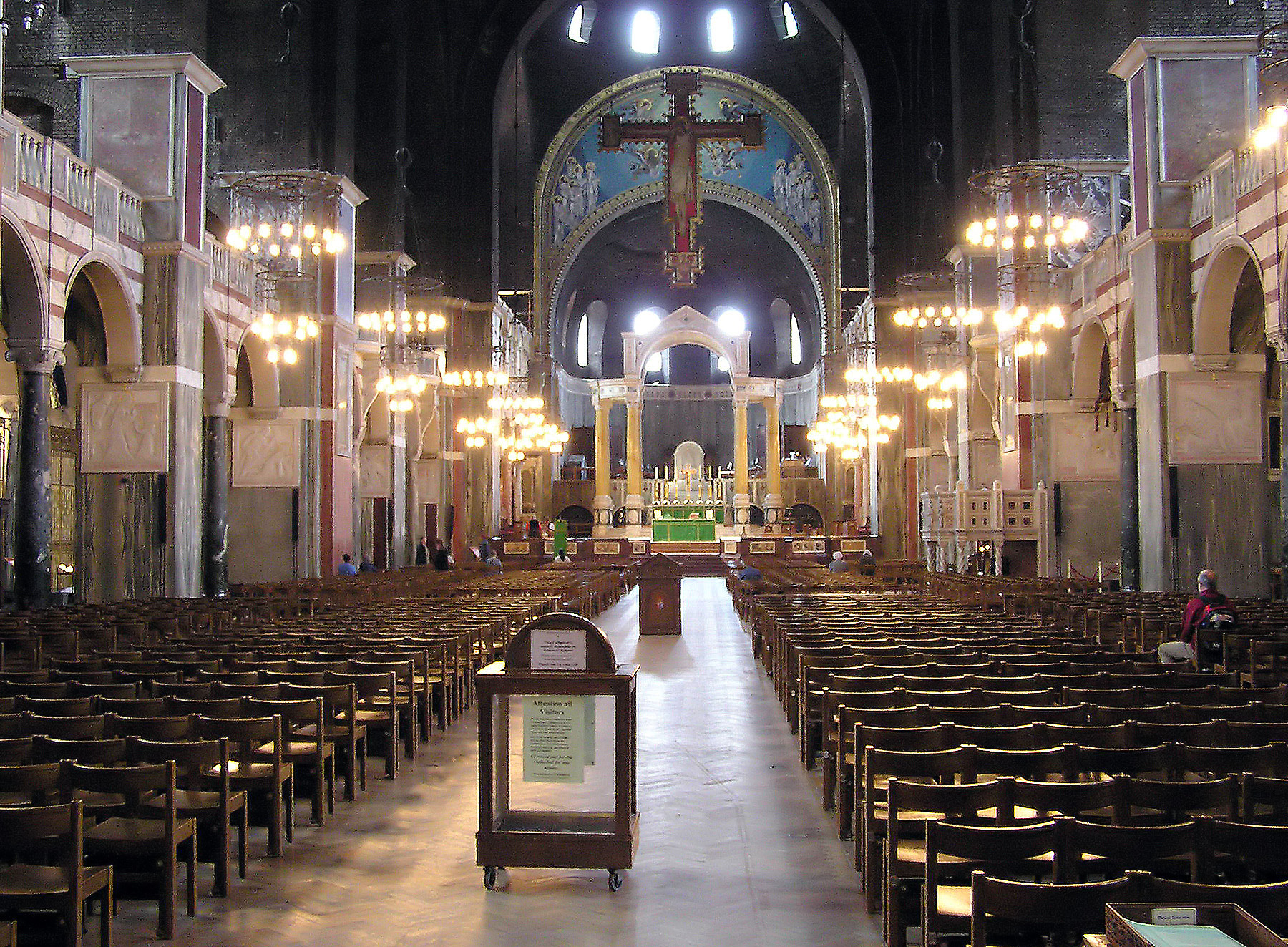
- Westminster Cathedral, where the Missa was first performed
- Key: D major
- Opus: 63
- Form: Missa brevis
- Text: Mass ordinary
- Performed: 22 July 1959: Westminster Cathedral, London
- Scoring: three-part treble choir and organ

The Missa Brevis in D, Op. 63, is a setting of the Latin mass completed by Benjamin Britten on Trinity Sunday, 1959. Set for three-part treble choir and organ, it was written for London's Roman Catholic Westminster Cathedral and was first performed there on 22 July of the same year. Britten admired the singing of the choir under George Malcolm and he completed the work in time to mark the retirement of Malcolm as organist and choirmaster at Westminster: the printed dedication reads "For George Malcolm and the boys of Westminster Cathedral Choir". It remained Britten's only liturgical setting of the mass. Malcolm's live recording, from a service at the cathedral, lasts ten minutes.

== Liturgy ==
Britten's Missa Brevis contains only four movements, omitting the Credo, hence the name brevis, short. The omission is notable because Mass at Westminster Cathedral would have included this movement. The piece rather seems predisposed towards the liturgy of the Church of England or the Protestant Episcopal Church of America, which often omit the sung Credo. In the Sanctus, Britten writes an optional transition between the first Hosanna and the Benedictus. This serves two functions: 1) it allows the sections to be elided seamlessly if the work is performed non-liturgically, and 2) it allows the section to be easily cut altogether for certain liturgical purposes, e.g. in the United States, the Benedictus was not officially approved by canon law and many Episcopal churches omitted it.

== Music ==
The Kyrie immediately presents the D major / F♯ major relationship that is a unifying element of the work, occurring also in the Gloria and the Sanctus. F♯ is the key center despite the key signature. The movement is in ternary form, with the central "Christe" inverting the melody of the Kyrie.

The Gloria is based on a 7/8 ostinato derived from the incipit Gloria XV that would be intoned by the celebrant in some liturgical settings. The additive time signature allows for various patterns of word stress. The central "Qui Tollis" juxtaposes F major against the prevailing D / F♯ bitonality and contrasts short phrases for solo voice with those for tutti unison.

The Sanctus in 3/2 presents a twelve-tone melodic line dominated by the interval of a perfect fourth, and shared between the three enharmonically overlapping voices. D Lydian, F♯ major, and F major are all suggested (the three prominent keys of the Gloria). The "Pleni sunt caeli" section features free imitative polyphony in the voices with the original twelve-tone melody transferred to the organ pedals. The Benedictus is a bitonal duet for two soloists, the first in G major, and the second in C major. This results in parallel fourths and false relations between F♯ and F♮. Following is an exultant contraction of all of the material preceding the Benedictus into just five measures.

The Agnus Dei, marked "Slow and Solemn", is in D minor. In 5/4 time, an organ pedal ostinato of rising thirds outlines the interval of a minor ninth. The threefold repeat of the Agnus Dei text gains intensity with each repetition through rising dynamics and register. The closing Dona Nobis Pacem builds to fortissimo; it is set with hammered repeated notes and overlapping intervals of a second between the voices. The organ ostinato finally breaks its pattern for the last two bars and the chorus closes with a pianississimo D minor triad.
