= Rejoice in the Lamb =

1943 cantata by Benjamin Britten

- Cantata by Benjamin Britten
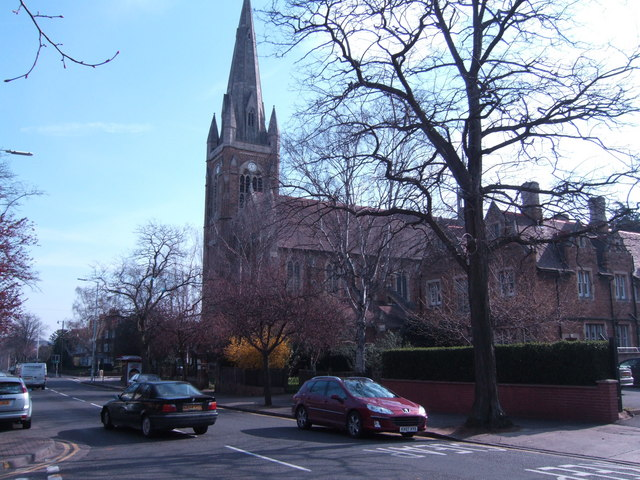
- St Matthew's Church, Northampton
- Opus: 30
- Occasion: 50th anniversary of St Matthew's Church, Northampton
- Text: Christopher Smart's poem Jubilate Agno
- Language: English
- Composed: 1943
- Duration: 16 min
- Scoring: four soloists, SATB choir and organ

Rejoice in the Lamb (Op. 30) is a cantata for four soloists, SATB choir and organ composed by Benjamin Britten in 1943 and uses text from the poem Jubilate Agno by Christopher Smart (1722–1771). The poem, purportedly written while Smart was in an asylum, depicts idiosyncratic praise and worship of God by different things including animals, letters of the alphabet and musical instruments. Britten was introduced to the poem by W. H. Auden whilst visiting the United States, selecting 48 lines of the poem to set to music with the assistance of Edward Sackville-West.

The cantata was commissioned by the Reverend Walter Hussey for the celebration of the 50th anniversary of the consecration of St Matthew's Church, Northampton. Critics praised the work for its uniqueness and creative handling of the text. Rejoice in the Lamb has been arranged for chorus, solos and orchestral accompaniment, and for SSAA choir and organ.

== History ==
Before writing Rejoice in the Lamb, Britten had established himself as a musical interpreter of traditional texts, as demonstrated with A Ceremony of Carols (1942) and his song cycle Les Illuminations (1939). In 1942, soon after returning to England from the United States, Britten was commissioned to write a choral piece for the 50th anniversary of the consecration of St Matthew's Church, Northampton, which took place the following year. The request for a composition came from the priest Walter Hussey, who was known as a great admirer of art and music and believed that the church should be a patron of art as it was during the Renaissance, Baroque and Classical periods. Hussey intended for the 50th anniversary of the consecration to also be a celebration of the arts. As well as commissioning the cantata, Hussey commissioned artworks from Henry Moore and Graham Sutherland. He approached Britten after listening to, and admiring, his Sinfonia da Requiem (1940). Hussey was also impressed the selection of music Britten chose for a 'personal choice' programme on the BBC, which featured Hussey's favourite choral anthem – Mozart's Ave verum corpus (1791).

Whilst Britten was visiting the US with Peter Pears, the poet W. H. Auden introduced him to the 1939 W. F. Stead edition of Jubilate Agno – a poem by the 18th century poet Christopher Smart. Britten chose to set music to this poem for his cantata, inspired by the far-reaching ways in which Smart depicted and manifested God. The music critic Edward Sackville-West aided Britten's selection of the text to use in his setting of the poem. After reviewing Rejoice in the Lamb, Hussey sent Britten a questionnaire with clarification questions about the text used within the piece, such as "3. On p.28 the first two rhimes of the Shawm should be 'Lawn fawn'? 'sound bound' belong to the trumpet. (Note. The Shawm is the predecessor of the oboe!)" Hussey also produced an article on Rejoice in the Lamb in anticipation of the celebrations of St Matthew's Church.

The first performance of Rejoice in the Lamb took place on 21 September 1943 as part of the anniversary celebration of St Matthew's Church, performed by the choir of St Matthew's under direction of Charles Barker. It was first broadcast by the BBC Home Service on 31 October 1943, performed by the same choir and conducted by Britten.

== Text ==
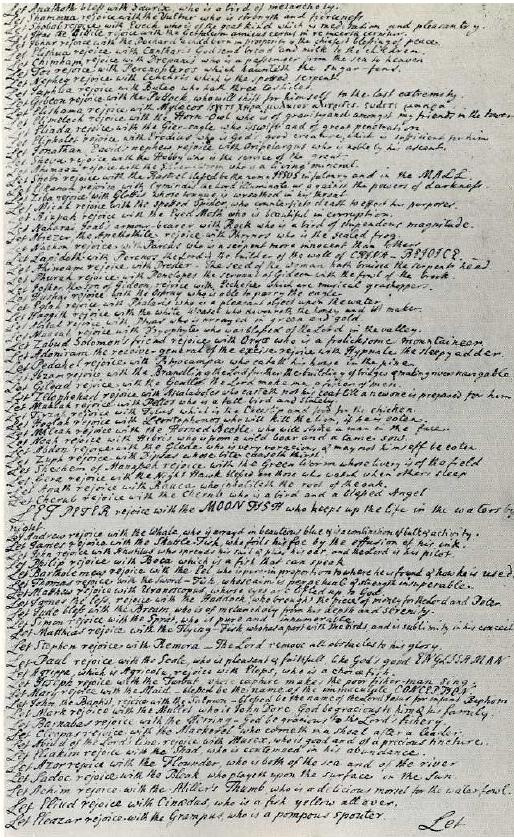
A page of the Jubilate Agno manuscript with the verses beginning "Let".

Rejoice in the Lamb sets music to 48 lines from Jubilate Agno by Smart. Smart was born in Kent in 1722 and was active during the Enlightenment. He began his career as an academic but became mentally unwell in part due to alcoholism and debt. In 1757 he was confined to an asylum and remained there until 1763. It was during this period in which he wrote Jubilate Agno – an idiosyncratic devotional poem. Whilst at its core the poem is, according to Christopher Headington, "a work expressing praise and an affirmation of faith", Peter Evans writes that Smart demonstrates this in an "eccentric" manner, depicting the various forms in which God manifests himself in the world: a cat, a mouse, letters of the alphabet and musical instruments. Mark Riddles, writing in The Choral Journal, says that Smart's "bewildering text seems to ramble between insight and insanity, biblical citation and mystic emanation, deep reverence and lighthearted playfulness".

The original manuscript for Jubilate Agno first entered public awareness in 1938. According to scholars Marus Walsh and Karina Williamson, it was "covered on both sides with a series of closely written, unnumbered verses". Almost each of the hundreds of lines begins with either the words "Let" or "For". Britten did not set all lines of the poem, but Peter Porter in The Britten Companion writes that the passages he selected are "more than well chosen", amounting to a "biopsy" of the entire work. In an analysis of Rejoice in the Lamb, Hilary Seraph Donaldson writes that Britten – who at the time of writing the piece was in a taboo same-sex relationship – may have empathised with Smart, who was also a misunderstood outcast.

== Composition ==
Rejoice in the Lamb is written for organ and SATB choir with treble/soprano, alto, tenor and bass soloists. The piece has a duration of about 16 minutes. It is divided into nine sections, which Riddles and Donaldson further collate into five groups: Opening Hymn, Animistic Praise, Lament, Mystic Praise and Closing Hymn.

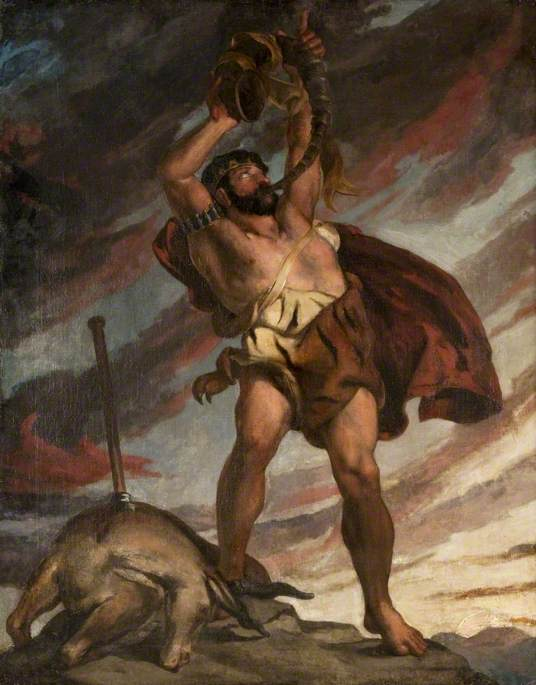
Jubilate Agno depicts characters from the Old Testament, including Nimrod.

I. Opening Hymn

- Rejoice in God, O ye Tongues (Chorus) – The opening of the piece sets the opening text of Jubilate Agno, which paraphrases Psalm 150: "Rejoice in God, O ye Tongues; give the glory to the Lord, and the Lamb..." The whole chorus sings the text on a quiet middle C, accompanied by an 8 ft C pedal on the organ. The organ occasionally punctuates the music with quaver staccato triads. The chorus finally changes note and crescendos on the word "magnify".
  The pieces then moves into a fast, declamatory passage, marked With vigour, which Riddles and Donaldson characterise as a "processional". Smart's text summons a collection of characters from the Old Testament, including Nimrod, Ishmael, Balaam, Ithamar, Jakim and David. Each line begins with "Let", for instance: "Let Nimrod, the mighty hunter, bind a Leopard to the altar, and consecrate his spear to the Lord." The rhythm of the section changes rapidly between time signatures 7/8, 6/8, 9/8, 5/8, 4/8, and 11/8. The final phrase of the 'Opening Hymn' section sets Smart's text "Hallelujah from the heart of God, and from the hand of the artist inimitable, and from the echo of the heavenly harp in sweetness magnifical and mighty." The voice parts sing in a quasi-canonical manner and with dotted rhythms in a "gently moving" 3/4 time. Michael Oliver, in his biography of Britten, remarks that the Hallelujah section resembles a similar passage in Igor Stravinsky's Symphony of Psalms (1930), of which Britten was a great admirer.

II. Animistic Praise

- For I will consider my Cat Jeoffrey (Treble/Soprano soloist) – This section is devoted to the depictions of Smart's cat Jeoffrey in Jubilate Agno and the ways in which he praises God. The soloist moves largely in a stepwise motion, juxtaposing triplet and duple rhythms. Britten uses trills and semiquavers in the organ part to depict the cat "wreathing his body seven times round with elegant quickness".
- For the Mouse is a creature of great personal valour (Alto soloist) – This section depicts a mouse which Smart writes is "a creature of great personal valor" who defends the female mouse against a cat. Michael Oliver describes this section as a "nimble march", marked fast and light, with what Kumbier calls "mocking" quavers and semiquavers in the upper register of the organ. Humphrey Carpenter writes that Britten may have been inspired here by cat and mouse cartoons he was known to enjoy. Donaldson further suggests that the passage is like a musical number inspired by Broadway or Rodgers and Hammerstein.
- For the flowers are great blessings (Tenor soloist) – Smart's text depicts the beauty of flowers, suggests they have some form of consciousness and compares them to the Christian concept of Resurrection. In this slow, pianissimo section, the organ plays alternating quavers, accompanying the tenor solo.

III. Lament

- For I am under the same accusation with my Saviour (Chorus) – In this passage, Smart writes of God's authority, his duties under him and anguishes over how he can preserve his cause. This section can be considered the high point of the piece. The chorus opens with a quiet unison passage on fifths, moving to an unexpected C minor chord to punctuate the word "saviour". The words "Silly fellow" are set to a musical motif which consists of two rising semitone quavers followed by a descending semitone semiquaver plus dotted quaver. Imogen Holst compares this motif to the crying out of "Peter Grimes! ... Peter Grimes!" from the chorus in Britten's opera Peter Grimes (1943). A chromatic canonical passage follows, echoing the Hallelujah passage from earlier in the piece, setting the text "For I am in twelve hardships". William Kumbier describes the canon as "dark" and writes that it shows the "pathetic prolongation and dismantling of the persecution figure".

IV. Mystic Praise

- For H is a spirit and therefore he is God (Bass soloist) – The text of this section is from what Riddles describes as "the most esoteric" lines of Jubilate Agno. Smart depicts God in all 26 letters of the alphabet and Britten sets a selection of these lines as a bass recitative, including "For H is a spirit and therefore he is God. For K is king and therefore he is God..."
- For the instruments are by their rhimes (Chorus) – This section, marked very gay and fast, is characterised by a "grandeur and spaciousness", repeating and transforming an F major trumpet fanfare-like motif first heard in the organ. The text is about various instruments and "their rhimes" (rhymes) ("For the Shawm rhimes are lawn fawn moon boon and the like..."), drawing comparisons to the concept of the Music of the Spheres. The chorus climaxes with a final declamation of "and the like", followed by a two-against-three rhythmic passage praising God's "blessed intelligence".

V. Closing Hymn

- For at that time malignity ceases – The chorus sings a unison, hymn-like passage in F major. Riddles writes that the passage recalls the "sweet peace" of Jeoffrey the cat from earlier in the piece, or the concept of axis mundi.
- Hallelujah from the heart of God (Chorus) – Britten closes the piece with a reprise of the Hallelujah section from the start of the piece.

== Critical response ==
Rejoice in the Lamb has widely been recognised for its uniqueness and creativity, especially within the realm of Church music. In British Music of Our Time (1946), Scott Goddard writes that Rejoice in the Lamb "has about it a freshness unlike anything in our music". Imogen Holst similarly writes that it is "as unlike conventional church music as it could possibly be". The poet Peter Porter writes that Rejoice in the Lamb "enshrines some of the purest responses ever made by a musician to the very heart of that mystery which we know as poetry". On 22 September 1943, the day after the premiere of Rejoice in the Lamb, The Times published a piece about the jubilee celebrations of St Matthew's Church and a review of Britten's cantata which also praised the text-setting: "Mr Britten has a way of choosing recondite texts for setting to music ... The spirit of the curious, vivid poem has been caught and a work not to be placed in any of the usual categories..." A 1943 review in the journal Music & Letters claims that although Britten did not necessarily transform "the ridiculous [text] into the sublime", he succeeded in recognising the "picturesque" value of the text. Furthermore, according to the review, Britten handles the more bizarre passages of the text, just as "For I shall consider my cat", with admirable restraint.

== Arrangements ==
A version of Rejoice in the Lamb for chorus, solos and orchestral accompaniment was arranged by Imogen Holst and published by Boosey & Hawkes. Holst conducted the first performance on 20 June 1952 in Aldeburgh Parish Church for the Aldeburgh Festival, which was co-founded by Britten in 1948. Among the performers were Alfred Deller as the counter-tenor soloist, Peter Pears as the tenor soloist and Ralph Downes on organ. Another version for SSAA choir and organ was arranged by Edmund Walters and published by Boosey & Hawkes in 1973. It was first performed on 3 July 1966 in Mossley Hill Church in Liverpool and first broadcast by the BBC on 19 December 1966.
