= Robert Walker (composer) =

English composer, writer and broadcaster

Robert Walker (born 18 March 1946) is an English composer, writer and broadcaster.

He was born in Northampton, England. He was a pupil at Northampton Grammar School (now Northampton School for Boys), and at the same time studied organ with John Bertalot and sang in the choir at St Matthew's Church, Northampton. He spent a pre-university year at the Royal School of Church Music in 1964 before gaining a choral scholarship as a countertenor at Jesus College, Cambridge in 1965, Subsequently, he was appointed to an organ scholarship at the same college. At Cambridge University he studied composition with Roger Smalley and organ with Arthur Wills (organist at Ely Cathedral). Whilst still at Cambridge he was appointed organist and Master of the Choristers at St James's Parish Church, Great Grimsby (now Grimsby Minster) and taught music at St. James's Choir School. In November 1968 he founded and conducted the Grimsby Bach Choir. During his time at Grimsby (1968–1973) he had private conducting lessons from Sir Adrian Boult, and a number of compositions were performed, including Three Songs of Gerard Manley Hopkins broadcast by Norma Procter and Paul Hamburger on BBC Radio 3.

In 1973 Walker left full-time employment to devote as much time to composition as possible. He studied composition with Peter Maxwell Davies at Dartington International Summer School. His first major commissions were to write two anthems for the enthronement of Dr. Donald Coggan as Archbishop of Canterbury in 1974: Psalm 150 and Thou Wilt Keep Him in Perfect Peace. In 1975 he took a lease on 'Brinkwells', Fittleworth, a dilapidated and remote thatched cottage in West Sussex where Edward Elgar had written his Cello Concerto and late chamber works. He restored it, and lived there until 1991. During the 1980s he began to broadcast for the BBC, first with BBC Schools broadcasts and later writing and presenting television documentaries for BBC2. He also presented live broadcasts from the BBC Promenade Concerts. Fascinated by Balinese gamelan music and dance he moved to the island of Bali and lived first in Ubud and later in a house he built himself in Karangasem where he played in the local gamelan orchestra. In 2000 the political situation in Indonesia was not good, so he took up a lectureship at Mahidol University in Bangkok, where he also conducted the university orchestra and chorus. In 2002 he took up a similar position at the premier arts university in Bangkok, Silpakorn University. In 2004, he returned to the U.K. and to his native Northamptonshire where he still lives.

== List of works ==
- Pavan (1975) – Solo violin and string orchestra; commissioned by the Greenwich Festival and first performed at Eltham Palace by Hugh Bean (violin). The Blackheath String Orchestra, conducted by Robert Munns.
- At Bignor Hill – Large orchestra + electric guitar, jazz drummer and synthesizer; commissioned by ITT for the Brighton Youth Symphony Orchestra conducted by David Gray who first performed it at the Gulbenkian Centre, Lisbon, Portugal.
- Chamber Symphony No. 1 (1981) – Chamber orchestra (2221/0100/timp/pno/str); commissioned by the Greenwich Festival and premiered by Richard Hickox and the City of London Sinfonia at the Royal Naval College, Greenwich, July 1981.
- Variations on a Theme of Elgar (1981) – Large orchestra (3333/4331/timp perc/str); commissioned by Chichester Festivities; premiered by the Royal Philharmonic Orchestra conducted by Sir Charles Groves, July 1981 in Chichester Cathedral.
- Charms and Exultations of Trumpets (1985) – 3 solo trumpets and large orchestra; commissioned by Hampshire County Youth Orchestra; first performed by them in Salisbury Cathedral conducted by Edgar Holmes, June 1985.
- Symphony No. 1 (1987) text by the composer – Bar. solo (movt. No. 5) and large orchestra (3333/4331/timp 2perc synth/str); commissioned for the Exeter Festival by Exeter City Council; first performed by David Wilson Johnson (bar.), Royal Philharmonic Orchestra conducted by Richard Hickox, July 1987.
- Maknaganda (1994) for Balinese gamelan and string orchestra; commissioned by the Eastern Orchestral Board and first performed by the strings of the Hallé Orchestra and various gamelan players; De Montfort Hall Leicester June 1994.
- My Dog Has Fleas (1987) A Capriccio for Scratch Orchestra – (2(pic)222/4.3.2+btbn.1/timp.perc/hp/str); commissioned by the Eastern Orchestral Board to celebrate its 25th anniversary.
- Elgar's Piano Concerto (formerly known as Fragments of Elgar) – Piano and orchestra (2222/4231/timp perc/str); a realisation by Robert Walker of the fragments and recordings of Elgar's unfinished piano concerto; commissioned by Dartington International Summer School with funds made available by the Eric James and Wong Foundations. First performed by the Dartington Festival Orchestra with David Owen Norris (piano), conducted by Graeme Jenkins; The Great Hall, Dartington, August 1998.
- Au Revoir (2002) for 11 solo strings or double string orchestra; written for the Goldberg Ensemble; first performance: 13 February 2003, Wolverhampton.
