= Missa pro populo =

Missa pro populo (Latin: "Mass for the people") is a term used in liturgical texts and rules of the Western Catholic Church. It refers to the requirement of all ordained pastors to say Mass for the people entrusted to them.

Each celebration of Mass can be dedicated (the technical term is 'applied') for a particular intention. The intention can be for the well-being of a living person or group of persons, or for the purification of one or more souls who have died. This is an ancient tradition for which there is evidence dating back to the second and third centuries of the Christian Era.

Under the current (1983) Code of Canon Law, both Diocesan Bishops and Parish Priests are required to apply one Mass for all the people entrusted to them on each Sunday and each Holy Day of Obligation. However, the cleric is able to fulfil this obligation by shifting the celebration of this Mass intention to another day, or by delegating the responsibility to another cleric.

== The parochial Mass pre-Vatican II ==
The Missa pro populo is historically linked with, but distinct from, the former concept of the Parochial Mass, as described in the 1913 Catholic Encyclopaedia:

The parish is established to provide the parishioners with the helps of religion, especially with Mass. ... Parishioners now fulfil their duty by assisting at Mass in any church; but formerly they had at least to hear a Mass in the parish church. This obligation fell into desuetude owing to the privileges granted to the religious orders; the Council of Trent, treats it only as a counsel; and notwithstanding certain provincial and diocesan regulations of the sixteenth and seventeenth centuries, the obligation ceased.

The Mass not being strictly conventual, it is not obligatory by common law for it to be sung as a missa cantata, but it may be, and frequently this is prescribed by the statutes or custom. It is then preceded by the blessing and aspersion of water on Sundays. Even if not sung, it is celebrated with additional solemnity, with more than two candles on the altar and at least two servers. What is characteristic of it is the instruction, with its special prayers, the announcements made to the congregation, the publication of banns of marriage, and finally the familiar sermon or homily.
