= Christopher Headington =

British musician (1930–1996)

Christopher John Magenis Headington (28 April 1930 – 19 March 1996) was an English composer, pianist, musicologist, and music critic.

== Early life and education ==
Born in London, he was educated at Taunton School and was a Scholar of the Royal Academy of Music. He studied with Sir Lennox Berkeley for composition and won a prize as best instrumentalist in his year. After graduating, he taught at Trinity College Glenalmond and subsequently (1954–64) at Lancing College and was Senior Assistant for Music Presentation for the BBC. In 1965 he became the Staff Tutor in Music for the Oxford University Department for External Studies, stepping down in 1982 to focus more on performance and music.

== Career ==
Headington had been composing for most of his adult life: His Violin Concerto of 1959 (described by Sibelius expert Robert Layton as "accomplished and beautiful"), premiered in 1959 by Ralph Holmes, was finally recorded in 1991 on ASV Records (with Xue-Wei as soloist and the London Philharmonic Orchestra under Jane Glover) and brought him wide recognition. Headington also wrote several pieces of chamber music: his Third String Quartet, composed to mark Haydn's 250th anniversary, reworks material from Haydn's Quartet op. 77 no. 2. Headington's solo piano pieces were strongly influenced by Debussy, Ravel and Chopin. His song-cycle, The Healing Fountain, was written in tribute to Benjamin Britten, and Headington ranked it as his finest achievement. His Piano Concerto of 1991 was also recorded by ASV (with Gordon Fergus-Thompson as soloist) as part of a posthumous collection released in 1997.

He was a contributor to Gramophone magazine and Country Life.

He also wrote a book on Chopin (Pavilion Books/Classic FM). He contributed to Alan Walker's Franz Liszt symposium (Barrie & Jenkins 1970), The Dictionary of Composers (Book Club Associates 1977), Building a Library (OUP 1979), The Britten Companion (Faber 1984), A Companion to the Concerto (Christopher Helm 1988), The Illustrated Encyclopedia of Classical Music (Salamander Books 1989), A Guide to Classical Composers (ed Gammond, Colour Library Books 1994), International Dictionary of Opera (St James Press 1993).

He wrote for The Inventions That Changed The World (Reader's Digest 1982) and The Fontana Biographical Companion to Modern Thought (Fontana 1983)

Headington made few concert appearances. He was piano soloist on the soundtrack of the 1978 film The Thirty Nine Steps (the composer was Ed Welch). He also went on to release four further albums on CD as performer.

Headington was a professional music advisor to the estate of the late JRR Tolkien with whom he had been a friend.

He was also an examiner for the Associated Board of the Royal Schools of Music (ABRSM) during the 1980s and in March 1985 assessed students on the island of Barbados under the administration of John George Fletcher (the ABRSM representative from 1969 to 2000).

== Death ==
Headington died in a skiing accident in Switzerland in 1996, aged 65.

== Works ==
- The Orchestra and Its Instruments (Bodley Head 1965)
- A History of Western Music (Bodley Head 1974, revised 2nd edition 1980, also Schirmer US edition and Paladin paperback)
- Illustrated Dictionary of Musical Terms (Bodley Head 1980, also Hamlyn paperback, Harper Row in US, Dutch translation Gaade Amerongen)
- The Performing World of the Musician (Hamish Hamilton 1981)
- Britten (Eyre Methuen 1981, US edition Holmes & Meier) and later rewritten for Omnibus Press
- Listener's Guide to Chamber Music (1982 Quarto Books New York, also Blandford Press UK)
- Opera: A History (Bodley Head 1987 Arrow paperback 1991)
- Sweet Sleep (Garamond & in US Clarkson Potter) - this is an anthology of lullabies.
- Peter Pears: A Biography (Faber & Faber 1992).
- J.S. Bach In Association with Classic FM (1994)
