= Frank Bridge =

English composer and violist (1879–1941)

- Bridge in 1921
- Born: February 26, 1879; Brighton
- Died: January 10, 1941 (aged 61)
- Occupations: Composer; Violist; Conductor

Frank Bridge (26 February 1879 – 10 January 1941) was an English composer, violist and conductor. He also taught Benjamin Britten.

== Life ==
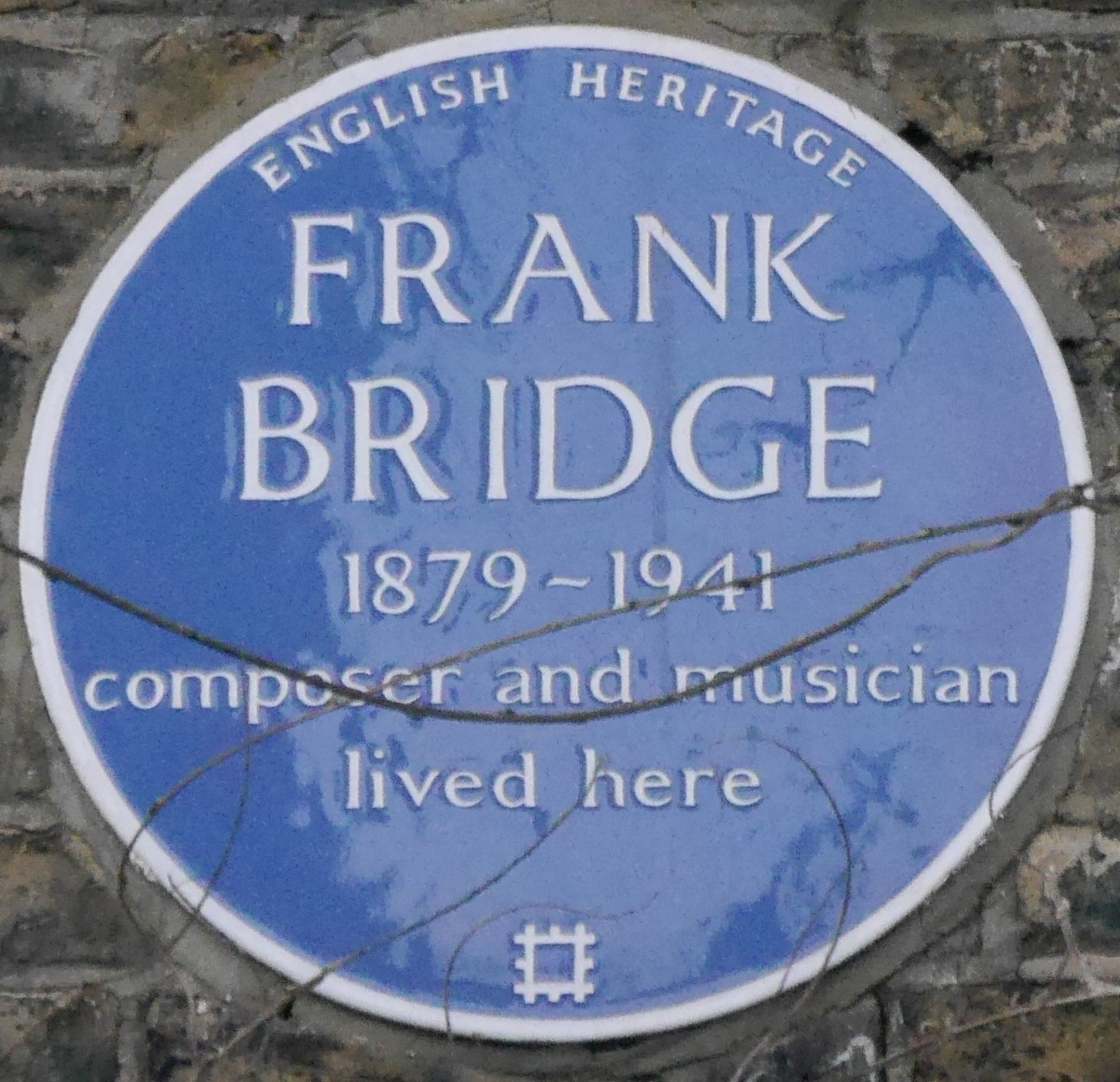
Blue plaque, 4 Bedford Gardens, Kensington, London

Bridge was born in Brighton, the ninth child of William Henry Bridge (1845–1928), a violin teacher and variety theatre conductor, formerly a master lithographic printer from a family of cordwainers, and his second wife, Elizabeth (née Warbrick; 1849–1899). His father "ruled the household with a rod of iron", and was insistent that his son spend regular long hours practising the violin; when Frank became sufficiently skilled, he would play with his father's pit bands, conducting in his absence, also arranging music and standing in for other instrumentalists. He studied at the Royal College of Music in London from 1899 to 1903 under Charles Villiers Stanford and others. He played in a number of string quartets, including second violin for the Grimson Quartet and viola for the English String Quartet (along with Marjorie Hayward). He also conducted, sometimes deputising for Henry Wood, before devoting himself to composition, receiving the patronage of Elizabeth Sprague Coolidge.

According to Benjamin Britten, Bridge had strong pacifist convictions, and he was deeply disturbed by the First World War, although the extent of his pacifism was questioned in the 2010s. During the war and immediately afterwards, Bridge wrote a number of pastoral and elegiac pieces that appear to search for spiritual consolation; principal among these are the Lament for strings, Summer for orchestra, A Prayer for chorus and orchestra, and a series of pastoral piano works. The Lament (for Catherine, aged 9 "Lusitania" 1915), for string orchestra, was written as a memorial to the sinking of the RMS Lusitania. The piece was premiered by the New Queen's Hall Orchestra on 15 September at the 1915 BBC Proms as part of a programme of "Popular Italian music"; Lament was conducted by the composer, whereas the rest was conducted by Henry Wood.

Bridge privately taught Benjamin Britten, who later championed his teacher's music and paid homage to him in the Variations on a Theme of Frank Bridge (1937), based on a theme from the second of Bridge's Three Idylls for String Quartet (1906). However, Bridge was not widely active as a teacher of composition, and his teaching style was unconventional – he appears to have focused on aesthetic issues, idiomatic writing, and clarity, rather than exhaustive technical training. Britten spoke very highly of his teaching, saying famously in 1963 that he still felt he had not "yet come up to the technical standards" that Bridge had set him. When Britten left for the United States with Peter Pears in 1939, Bridge handed Britten his Giussani viola and wished him 'bon voyage and bon retour'; Bridge died in 1941 without ever seeing Britten again. His grave lies in the churchyard of St Mary the Virgin in Friston, East Sussex.

== Music ==
The earliest extant works are a series of substantial chamber works produced during his studies with C. V. Stanford at the Royal College of Music, along with a number of shorter works in various genres. Bridge completed his first major orchestral score, a Symphonic Poem (sometimes referred to as Mid of the Night), shortly after completing his studies. Brahms, Beethoven, Tchaikovsky, Franck, and Fauré are notable influences on this period.

The works completed in the following years suggest a search for a more mature and expressive idiom, culminating in the tumultuous First String Quartet and a series of Phantasies for chamber ensembles. His orchestral idiom developed more gradually, reaching a new maturity in The Sea of 1911, which was to become his most popular and successful orchestral work, receiving frequent performances at the Henry Wood Promenade Concerts during his lifetime.

In the period leading up to the First World War Bridge demonstrates an interest in more modernist tendencies, most notably in Dance Poem of 1913, which suggests the influence of Stravinsky and Debussy. During the war period, his exploration generally took more moderate forms – most often a pastoralism influenced by impressionism – although work such as the Two Poems for orchestra and several piano pieces display significant developments in his harmonic language, specifically towards a coloristic, non-functional use of harmony, and a preference for harmony derived from symmetrical scales such as whole tone and octatonic. During the same period Bridge completed two of his most successful chamber works, the Second String Quartet and Cello Sonata.

Bridge's idiom in the wartime works tends towards moderation, but after the war his language developed significantly, building on the experiments with impressionist harmony found in the wartime piano and orchestral music. Bridge's technical ambitions (documented in his correspondence) prompted him to attempt more complex, larger works, with more advanced harmonic elements and motivic working. Several of the resulting works have some expressive connections with the First World War, which appears to have influenced the mood of the Piano Sonata (1921–24, dedicated to his friend Ernest Farrar, killed in 1918) and certainly Oration (1929–30).

During the 1920s Bridge pursued his ambitions to write more serious, substantial works. The Piano Sonata was the first major work to showcase his mature, post-tonal language on a substantial scale. This language is developed and used more effectively in the Third String Quartet, which sparked a series of major orchestral and chamber works, several of which rank among Bridge's greatest.

A final group of works followed in the 1930s and early 40s, including the Fourth String Quartet, the Phantasm for piano and orchestra, Oration for cello and orchestra, the Rebus Overture, and the first movement of a projected Symphony for strings.

Although he was not an organist, nor personally associated with music of the English Church, his short pieces for organ have been among the most performed of all his output.

Bridge was frustrated that his later works were largely ignored while his earlier "Edwardian" works continued to receive attention.

== Bibliography ==
- Banfield, Stephen (Spring 1986). "'Too Much of an Albion?': Mrs Coolidge and Her British Connections". American Music. 4 (1): 59–88. doi:10.2307/3052185. JSTOR 3052185.
- Bray, Trevor (October 1977). Senior, Evan (ed.). "Frank Bridge and Mrs Coolidge". Music and Musicians. Vol. 26, no. 2. Hansom Books. pp. 28–30.
- Britten, Benjamin (1991). Mitchell, Donald; Reed, Philip (eds.). Letters from a Life: The Selected Letters and Diaries of Benjamin Britten, 1913–1976. Vol. 4. Woodbridge, Suffolk, and Rochester, NY: Boydell Press. ISBN 978-1-84383-382-6.
- Cerabona, Ron (8 May 2014). "Pianists Celebrate Wartime Composers". The Canberra Times.
- Hindmarsh, Paul (1980). The Organ Music of Frank Bridge (Liner notes for LP recording, 1 disc). Stuart Campbell, organ. Kent: Pearl Records. Pearl SHE 545.
- Hindmarsh, Paul (1983). Frank Bridge - A Thematic Catalogue. London: Faber. ISBN 0-571-10032-5.
- Hindmarsh, Paul (2016). Frank Bridge - The Complete Works. Poynton: PHM Publishing. ISBN 978-1-5262-0264-2.
- Huss, Fabian (2015). The Music of Frank Bridge. Woodbridge: The Boydell Press. ISBN 978-1-78327-059-0.
- Kildea, Paul. 2013. Benjamin Britten: A Life in the Twentieth Century. London: Allen Lane. ISBN 978-0-14-192430-4 (pbk); ISBN 978-1-84614-232-1.
- Meyer, Leonard B. (1967). Music, the Arts, and Ideas. Chicago: University of Chicago Press. ISBN 978-0-226-52141-1.
- Mitchell, Donald; Reed, Philip, eds. (1991). Letters from a Life: 1923-1939. Letters from a Life: The Selected Letters and Diaries of Benjamin Britten 1913–1976. Vol. 1. associate editors Rosamund Strode, Kathleen Mitchell, and Judy Young (revised reprint ed.). London: Faber and Faber. ISBN 978-0-571-15221-6.
- Payne, Anthony (1984). Frank Bridge: Radical and Conservative. Published in conjunction with the Frank Bridge Trust. London: Thames Publishing. ISBN 978-0-905210-25-4.
- Payne, Anthony; Foreman, Lewis; Bishop, John (1976). The Music of Frank Bridge. London: Thames Publishing. ISBN 978-0-905210-02-5.
- Payne, Anthony; Hindmarsh, Paul; Foreman, Lewis (2001). "Bridge, Frank". In Sadie, Stanley; Tyrrell, John (eds.). The New Grove Dictionary of Music and Musicians. Vol. 4 (2nd ed.). London: Macmillan.
