= The Sea (Bridge) =

Symphonic tone poem by Frank Bridge

The Sea, H.100 is an orchestral suite written in 1910–11 by Frank Bridge. It is also described as a symphonic tone poem. It lasts about 22 minutes.

== Structure ==
It consists of four movements, about which Bridge wrote the following comments for the programme notes at the premiere:

1. Seascape: Allegro ben moderato

- "Seascape paints the sea on a summer morning. From high drifts is seen a great expanse of waters lying in the sunlight. Warm breezes play over the surface."

2. Sea Foam: Allegro vivo

- "Sea-foam froths among the low-lying rocks and pools on the shore, playfully not stormy."

3. Moonlight: Adagio non troppo

- "A calm sea at night. The first moonbeams are struggling to pierce through dark clouds, which eventually pass over, leaving the sea shimmering in full moonlight."

4. Storm: Allegro energico – Allegro moderato e largamente

- "Wind, rain and tempestuous seas, with the lulling of the storm an [allusion] to the first number is heard and which may be regarded as the sea-lover's dedication to the sea."

== History ==
Bridge completed the work in July 1911, while staying at the Sussex coastal town of Eastbourne. This was the same place where Claude Debussy had finished his own musical evocation of the sea, the symphonic poem La mer (The Sea), in 1905. Bridge was to die at Friston near Eastbourne in 1941.

The Sea received its first performance at a Prom Concert in London on 24 September 1912, with the New Queen's Hall Orchestra conducted by Sir Henry Wood.

The composer himself conducted the Cleveland Orchestra, Detroit Symphony and Boston Symphony premieres after the First World War.

Bridge also conducted a recording of the suite. Later recordings have been conducted by Sir Charles Groves, Vernon Handley and Richard Hickox.

== Instrumentation ==
Piccolo, 2 Flutes, 2 Oboes, English Horn, 2 Clarinets in A and B♭, Bass Clarinet in A and B♭, 2 Bassoons, Contrabassoon, 4 Horns in F, 3 Trumpets in A and B♭, 3 Trombones, Tuba, Timpani, Percussion (Triangle, Snare Drum, Cymbals, Bass Drum), Harp, Strings.

== Influence ==
The first movement, Seascape, influenced Arnold Bax in his writing of the symphonic poem Tintagel.

The Sea was the work that first introduced the ten-year-old Benjamin Britten to Bridge's music. It was also the first significant piece of modern music he had ever encountered. He heard it, conducted by the composer, at the Norfolk and Norwich Festival on 30 October 1924, which he had attended on the encouragement of his viola teacher Audrey Alston. Britten was, in his own words, "knocked sideways". The Norwich Festival's committee was also impressed; they commissioned another work from Bridge for the 1927 Festival; this was Enter Spring, which also made a great impact on Britten. The 1927 Norwich Festival was also where Britten was able to meet Bridge through Audrey Alston. This led to Bridge taking Britten as the only composition student he ever had.

One of Britten's first significant works was a tribute to his teacher, Variations on a Theme of Frank Bridge (1937). The titles of the movements of Britten's "Four Sea Interludes" from his opera Peter Grimes have striking similarities to the titles of the movements of Bridge's The Sea.
