= Mary Potter (painter) =

(1900 - 1981) English artist

Mary Potter

Mary Potter, OBE (9 April 1900 – 14 September 1981) was an English painter whose best-known work uses a restrained palette of subtle colours.

After studying at the Slade School of Fine Art, Potter began her career, exhibiting in London by the early 1920s. From the 1950s, her work became increasingly abstract, and she gained wider notice.

== Early life and career ==
Potter was born Marian (Mary) Anderson Attenborough in Beckenham, Kent. Her parents were Arthur (John) Attenborough (1873–1940), a solicitor, and his wife, Kathleen Mary, née Doble (1872–1957). Potter attended St Christopher's school in Beckenham, and the Beckenham School of Art. She studied under Henry Tonks at the Slade School of Fine Art, beginning in 1918, where she won many prizes including the first prize for portrait painting

After leaving school, she shared a studio in Fitzroy Street in London's bohemian Fitzrovia neighborhood, became a member briefly of the Seven and Five Society and exhibited with The New English Art Club and The London Group. She worked in oil paint and watercolours. She was married to the writer and radio producer Stephen Potter from 1927 to 1955, and the couple had two children, Andrew (born 1928) and Julian (born 1931). Her first solo exhibition was in 1932 at the Bloomsbury Gallery in London. During the Second World War, the family moved out of London but returned soon afterwards. Her paintings ranged from still lifes and landscapes to portraits, including one of Joyce Grenfell.

== Later years ==
In 1951, Potter moved with her husband to Aldeburgh on the east coast of Suffolk and lived in The Red House which she swapped, in 1957, for Crag House, owned by Benjamin Britten, with whom she became a close friend after her divorce in 1955. With her children grown, she spent long hours painting. By mixing paint with beeswax, she achieved a "chalky luminous quality" using a "pale and subtle" range of colours, and her work grew increasingly abstract. In his essay for the catalogue of her 1965 Whitechapel Art Gallery exhibition, Mary Potter Paintings 1938–1964, museum director Kenneth Clark said Potter's works "exist in the domain of seeing and feeling; we know that they are exactly right in the same way that we know a singer to be perfectly in tune"; he described her paintings as "enchanting moments of heightened perception".

In the 1960s and 1970s Potter gained increasing recognition. From 1967 she had seven solo shows with the New Art Centre in London, which continued to champion her work following her death, holding a further five Mary Potter exhibitions. She was awarded an OBE in 1979, and major retrospective exhibitions of her work were shown at the Tate Gallery in 1980 and the Serpentine Gallery in 1981, which opened to great critical acclaim a few months before her death. In a review of that exhibition in The Sunday Times, Marina Vaizey wrote: "The results over the past several decades have been paintings of the most exquisite tensile webs of pale resonant colour, the subjects almost vanished, but the echoes imaginatively suggesting the fullness of life: an evanescent evocation of the shapes and surroundings in which people live. The very delicacy is paradoxically full-blooded". Also in 1981 Potter won the John Moores prize. The John Moore prize was awarded by The Walker Gallery to encourage lesser known artists to participate in the art world.

William Packer the art critic commented on Mary Potter’s art work, for the Financial Times, after one of her shows calling it, “very English, and very good.” He compared her work to that of Victor Pasmore, “Those much-vaunted paintings of his, of the Thames along Chiswick Reach made just after the war, are more than equalled by her comparable and contemporaneous images of the breezy, spray-swept front at Brighton, and her views of Regent's Park and in the Zoo."

She died of lung cancer, at age 81, at her home in Aldeburgh.

== Selected collections ==
- Tate Gallery (five paintings)
- Imperial War Museum
- Southampton City Art Gallery (five paintings)
- Norwich Castle Museum
- The Government Art Collection (six paintings)
- Kirklees museums and galleries

== Solo exhibitions ==
- 1964 Whitechapel Art Gallery retrospective
- 1967 to 1989 New Art Centre, London
- 1980 Tate Gallery
- 1981 Serpentine Gallery (organised by The Arts Council of Great Britain)
