= Cello Sonata (Britten) =

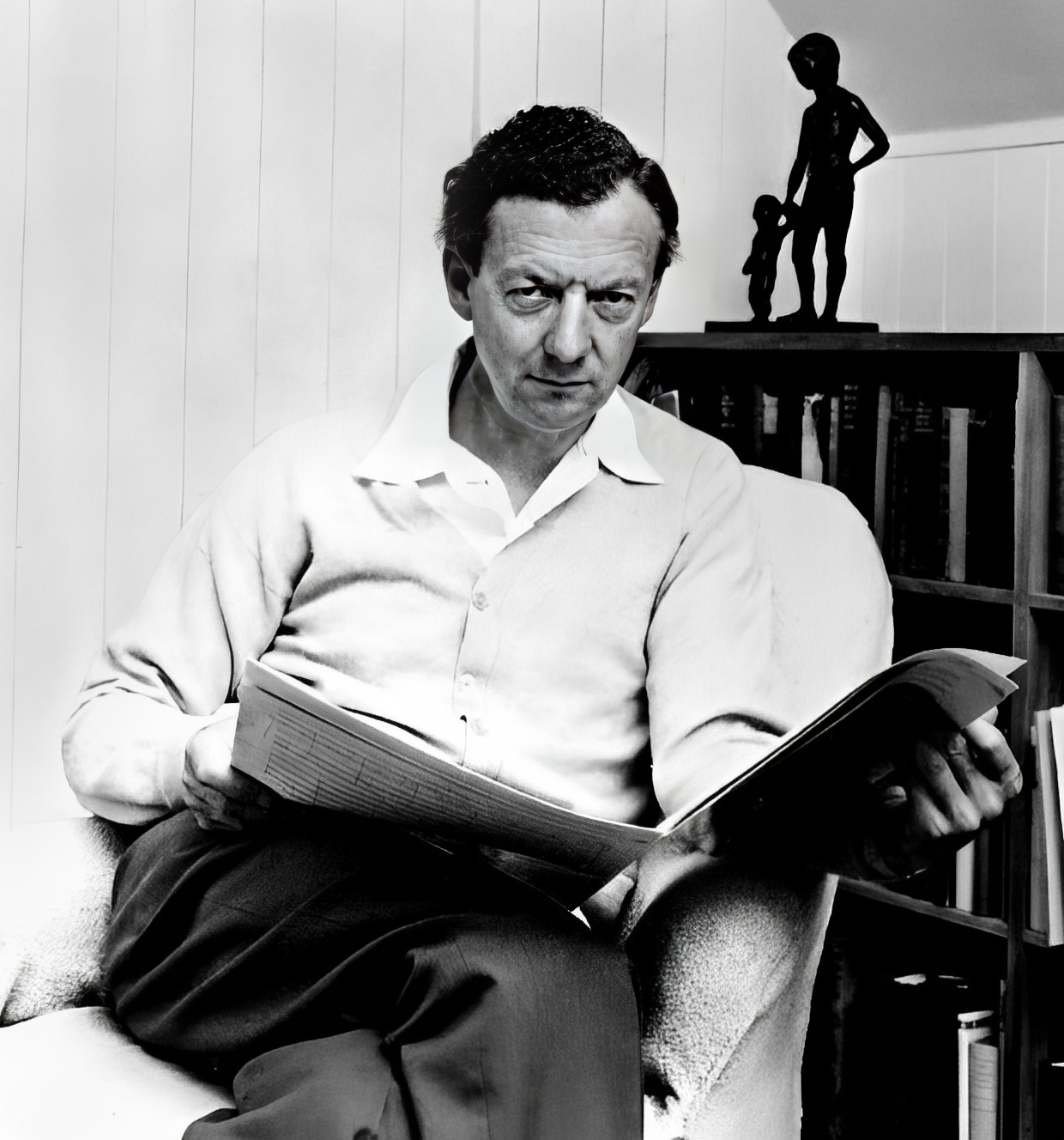
Benjamin Britten in 1968

The Cello Sonata, Op. 65, is a work by the English composer Benjamin Britten. It was premiered in July 1961 at the Aldeburgh Festival in Suffolk. The work is in five movements:

1. Dialogo. Allegro
2. Scherzo–Pizzicato. Allegretto
3. Elegia. Lento
4. Marcia. Energico
5. Moto perpetuo. Presto

== History ==
On 21 September 1960, a concert at the Royal Festival Hall in London introduced Britten to the cellist Mstislav Rostropovich. The programme included the British premiere of Dmitri Shostakovich's First Cello Concerto, performed by Rostropovich, alongside Britten's The Young Person's Guide to the Orchestra. The two composers shared a ceremonial audience box. Shostakovich later confided to Rostropovich:

Slava, do you know I am aching from so many bruises along my side." "What happened, Dmitri Dmitriyevich, did you fall down?" "No, but at the concert tonight, every time Britten admired something in your playing, he would poke me in the ribs, and say, 'Isn't that simply marvelous!' As he liked so many things throughout the concerto, I am now suffering!

After the performance, Rostropovich, already established as an obsessive commissioner of new works, pleaded with Britten to write him a piece for cello. The composer consented, and a year later produced the Cello Sonata, Op. 65. This became Britten's first of five major works written for Rostropovich over the course of the next decade – the others being the Cello Symphony and the three suites for solo cello.

Britten's correspondence with Rostropovich reveals the composer's humility in the face of Rostropovich's reputation: he confesses "I may have made some mistakes" and quips that "the pizzicato movement will amuse you; I hope it is possible!" In the scherzo-pizzicato, one can immediately detect an indebtedness, in its timbre and counterpoint, to the Balinese gamelan tradition. The final Moto perpetuo movement uses the DSCH motif (the musical transformation of Shostakovich's name) as a tribute to the composer who inspired Britten to write for cello. The first performance took place at the Aldeburgh Festival on 7 July 1961.
