= Rita Thomson =

Scottish nurse (1934–2019)

- Born: 16 August 1934
- Died: 11 October 2019 (aged 85)
- Education: Dingwall Academy Royal Northern Hospital Royal Brompton Hospital
- Occupation: Nurse
- Known for: Nurse to Benjamin Britten and Peter Pears

Rita Thomson (16 August 1934 – 11 October 2019) was a Scottish nurse who looked after the composer Benjamin Britten and the singer Peter Pears at their home in Aldeburgh, Suffolk, England.

== Early life ==
Thomson was born in Dingwall, Ross and Cromarty, in the Scottish Highlands. She was the second daughter of Evander Thomson, a coach trimmer. She attended Dingwall Academy, and the Edinburgh School of Mothercraft, afterwards training as a nurse at the Royal Northern Hospital in Inverness. She further trained in thoracic medicine at London's Royal Brompton Hospital.

== Career ==
Thomson worked in Australia for two years, before returning to London in 1965, to be appointed senior ward sister at London's National Heart Hospital. In 1973, she was part of the team looking after the composer Benjamin Britten, who was brought into intensive care for an operation to replace a heart valve. She visited Britten while he recuperated at The London Clinic, and subsequently at his home in Aldeburgh. In 1974, he asked her to move into his home in Aldeburgh, the Red House, where she nursed him until he died in 1976. Peter Pears asked her to stay on and she retrained as a health visitor, as well as looking after Pears until his death in 1986. She continued to live in the Red House as custodian for 10 years, then moved to another home in Aldeburgh until her own death in 2019. During that time, the Red House became the centre for the Britten-Pears Foundation, which celebrates Britten's music and his work with Pears.

Thomson is credited with supporting Britten during his final years, during which he completed his last opera, Death in Venice. In the BBC documentary film on Britten's life, Endgame, there are scenes of Thomson and Britten on a visit to Venice. In the film, Jenni Wake Walker, a colleague at the Aldeburgh Festival, is quoted as saying "Rita was a breath of fresh air for Ben. She brought him a lot of sunshine."
