= Variations on a Theme of Frank Bridge =

1937 composition by Benjamin Britten

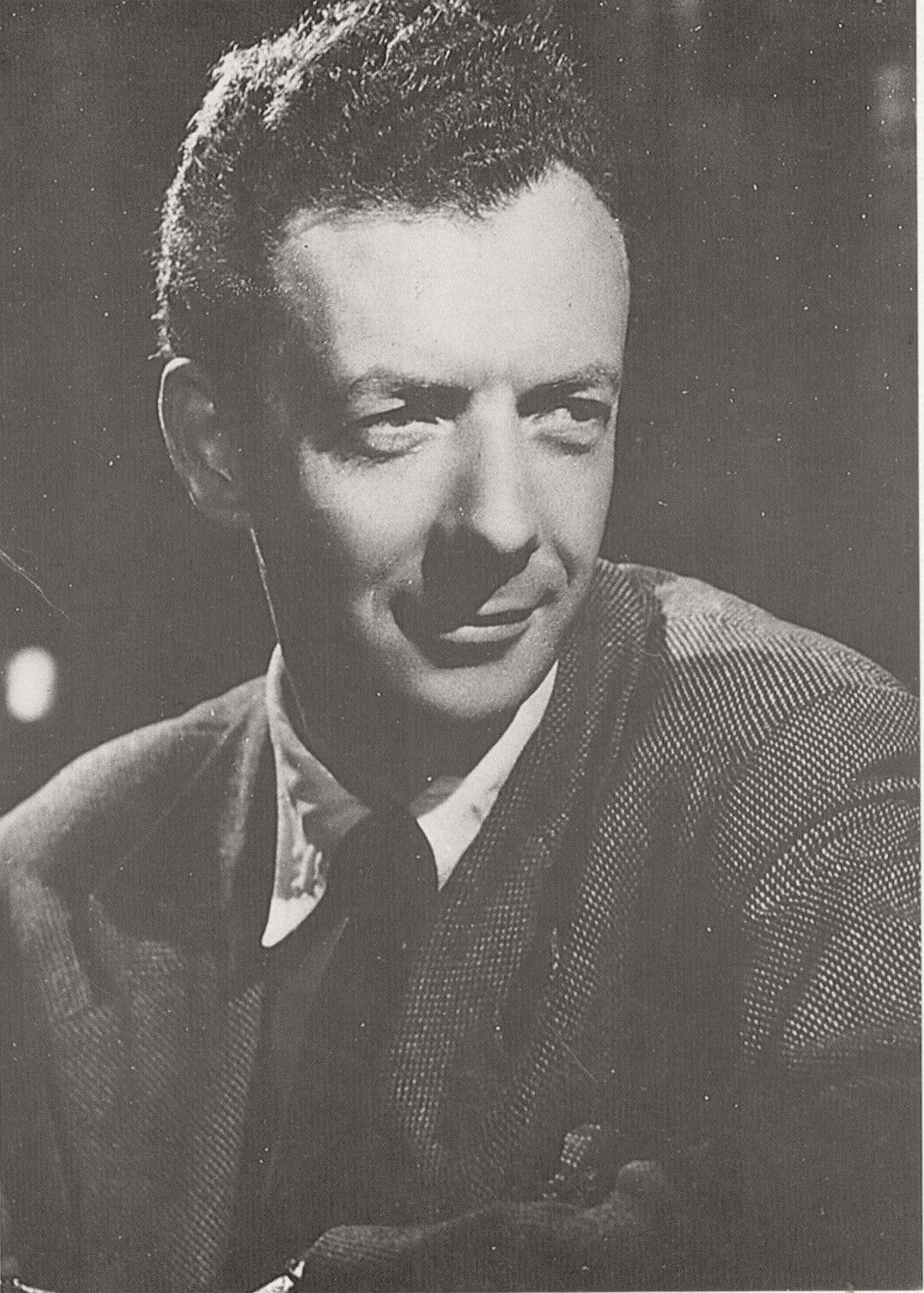
Benjamin Britten in the 1940s

Variations on a Theme of Frank Bridge, Op. 10, is a work for string orchestra by Benjamin Britten. It was written in 1937 at the request of Boyd Neel, who conducted his orchestra at the premiere of the work at that year's Salzburg Festival. It was the work that brought Britten to international attention.

== Background ==
Benjamin Britten studied with Frank Bridge from 1927. In 1932 he began writing a set of variations on a theme from one of Bridge's works, as a tribute to his teacher, but he was distracted by other matters and the work went nowhere.

In May 1937, the organisers of the Salzburg Festival invited Boyd Neel and his orchestra to perform three works at that year's Festival, in August, only three months away. One of those works had to be a previously unperformed work by a British composer. Neel knew Britten from having conducted his film score for Love from a Stranger in 1936, so he asked him to write a new work for a string orchestra. Britten accepted the commission and immediately started work on a new set of variations on a theme by Bridge. Britten took as his theme the second of Bridge's Three Idylls for string quartet, Op. 6, No. 2. The first sketch was completed in 10 days, and the work was fully scored by 12 July.

He dedicated the work "To F.B. A tribute with affection and admiration". Both Bridge and Britten attended rehearsals of the work.

The work was given its concert premiere, as planned, on 27 August 1937 in Salzburg. However, its broadcast premiere occurred two days earlier; it was played live on Radio Hilversum on 25 August. Its British premiere took place on 5 October of the same year.

It was first recorded in 1938 by Neel conducting his own string orchestra. A recording with Britten himself conducting did not appear until 1967, with the English Chamber Orchestra for Decca. It has also been recorded by many other ensembles, with conductors including Herbert von Karajan, Yehudi Menuhin, Sir Charles Groves, Sir Alexander Gibson, Iona Brown, Sir Gilbert Levine, and Steuart Bedford.

== Structure ==
The work is structured as follows:

- Introduction and Theme
- Variation 1: Adagio
- Variation 2: March
- Variation 3: Romance
- Variation 4: Aria Italiana
- Variation 5: Bourrée classique
- Variation 6: Wiener Waltzer
- Variation 7: Moto perpetuo
- Variation 8: Funeral March
- Variation 9: Chant
- Variation 10: Fugue and Finale

Each variation is a nod to a specific quality in Bridge's personality, but reflected through the prism of Britten's own personality. The Adagio represented Bridge's integrity; the March was his energy; the Romance his charm; the Aria Italiana his humour; the Bourrée his tradition; the Wiener Walzer his enthusiasm; the Moto perpetuo his vitality; the Funeral March his sympathy; the Chant was his reverence; the Fugue was his skill (it contains a number of references to other works by Bridge); and their mutual affection appears in the Finale. These connections were made explicit on the score Britten presented to Bridge, but they do not appear in the printed score.

Britten also imitated the styles of a number of composers such as Gioachino Rossini, Maurice Ravel and Igor Stravinsky.

Paul Kildea writes of the piece:

Though the theme is played in the opening section, it is done so rather whimsically, and it is only at the end of the piece that it is spelled out with weight and clarity. When it arrives it makes sense of everything that has gone before it, demanding that we start again from the beginning, hearing the work once more, this time with our ears alert.

A typical performance of the work lasts around 27 minutes.

== Ballet arrangements ==
In 1942 Colin McPhee, a close friend of Britten's, arranged the Variations for two pianos, to be used for Lew Christensen's ballet Jinx.

In 1949, Arthur Oldham, the only private pupil Britten ever had, arranged the work for full symphony orchestra, for Frederick Ashton's ballet Le Rêve de Léonor. This had its first performance on 26 April 1949 at the Prince's Theatre, London, by the Ballet de Paris de Roland Petit.

Twyla Tharp has also used the music for a ballet, How Near Heaven.

Hans van Manen created the choreography Frank Bridge Variations for the composition in 2005, for the Dutch National Ballet with set and costume design by Keso Dekker.

== See also ==
- List of variations on a theme by another composer
