= Benjamin Britten: A Life in the Twentieth Century =

2013 book by Paul Kildea

- Author: Paul Kildea
- Language: English
- Genre: Biography
- Published: January 2013
- Publisher: Allen Lane
- Pages: 665
- ISBN: 978-0-14-192430-4
- OCLC: 812688737

Benjamin Britten: A Life in the Twentieth Century is a book by the Australian author and composer Paul Kildea first published in January 2013 to mark the centenary year of British composer Benjamin Britten. The book was featured on BBC Radio 4's Book of the Week in February 2013.
