= A Hymn of St Columba =

- Choral music by Benjamin Britten
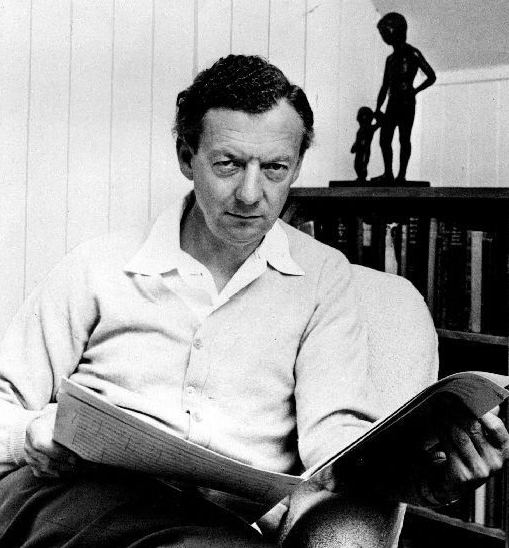
- The composer in the mid-1960s
- Text: Hymn by Saint Columba
- Language: Latin
- Composed: 1962
- Dedication: Derek Hill
- Published: 1963
- Scoring: choir; organ

A Hymn of St Columba is a composition for choir and organ written in 1962 by the English composer Benjamin Britten. It is a setting of a Latin hymn attributed to Saint Columba, the founder of Iona Abbey, and was published by Boosey & Hawkes.

== History ==
Britten composed A Hymn of St Columba on 29 December 1962. He wrote the work on a commission to commemorate the 1400th anniversary of a voyage by Columba from Ireland to the Scottish island of Iona, where he founded Iona Abbey and based his missionary work in the Highlands of Scotland.

Britten set a hymn attributed to Columba, in three stanzas of five lines each. The first line, "Regis regum rectissimi", freely translated as "King of kings and of lords most high", is also the last line of all three stanzas. The text reflects the day of judgement, similar to the Dies irae sequence, first in anxiety and finally in an outlook for rest after earthly desires have ended.

A Hymn of St Columba is dedicated to Derek Hill, who commissioned it, and was published by Boosey & Hawkes. It was premiered outdoors in Churchill, County Donegal, where Columba is said to have preached, but was not easily audible due to the strong wind. The work has been recorded several times.

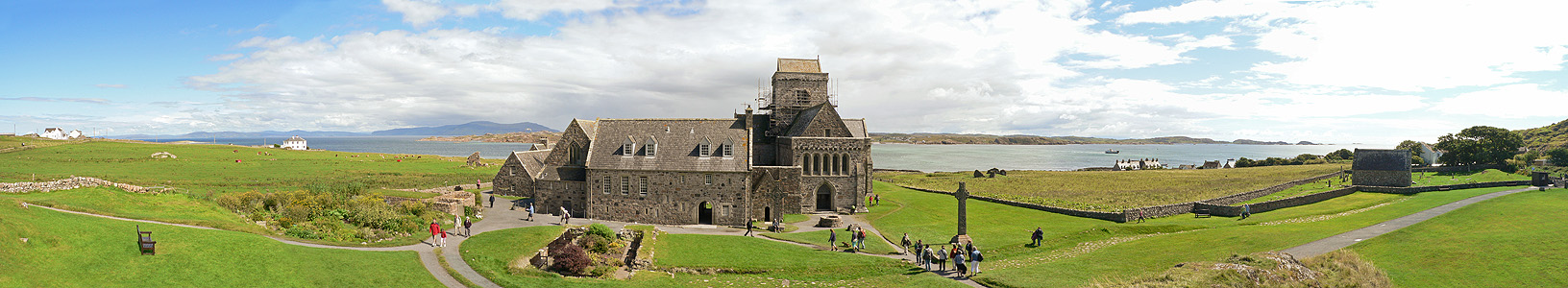
Panorama of Iona Abbey

== Music ==
The music of A Hymn of St Columba follows the tradition of Anglican church music, with added personal features. It is suitable as an introit or anthem in services such as commemorations of Saint Columba, All Souls' Day and Remembrance Day. The duration is given as two-to-three minutes.

The music is scored for a four-part choir and organ. Britten begins, setting the mood of fear for the day of judgement, with an ostinato in the pedal, which recurs throughout the piece, also in the manuals. The voices begin with a unison line, which later reappears at the end as a canon of the high voices and the low voices. In the end, the opening line is sung pianissimo, addressing the "king of kings" with "hushed awe", as Paul Spicer describes. When Britten conducted the work, he wanted it sung "with fire".

Original Latin	English translation
Regis regum rectissimi Prope est dies domini, Dies irae et vindictae, Tenebrarum et nebulae, Regis regum rectissimi. Diesque mirabilium Tonitruorum fortium, Dies quoque angustiae, Maeroris ac tristitiae. Regis regum rectissimi. In quo cessabit mulierum Amor et desiderium, Nominumque contentio Mundi hujus et cupido. Regis regum rectissimi prope est dies domini.	King of kings and of lords most high, Comes his day of judgement nigh: Day of wrath and vengeance stark, Day of shadows and cloudy dark. King of kings and of lords most high. Thunder shall rend that day apart, Wonder amaze each fearful heart. Anguish and pain and deep distress Shall mark that day of bitterness. King of kings and of lords most high. That day the pangs of lust will cease, Man's questing heart shall be at peace; Then shall the great no more contend And worldly fame be at an end King of kings and of lords most high, Comes his day of judgement nigh.
