= The Red House, Aldeburgh =

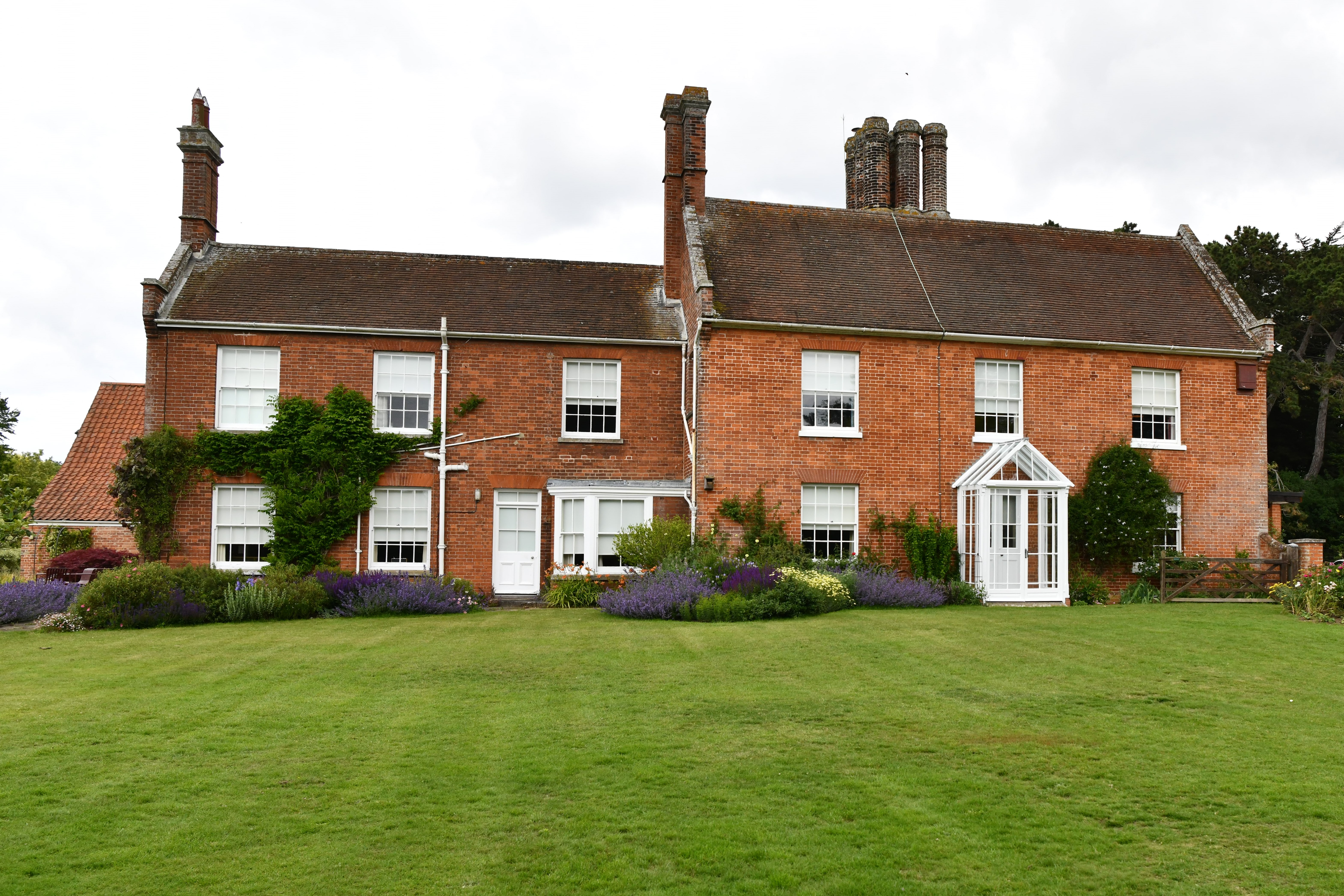

- Location in Suffolk
- 52°09′53″N 1°35′16″E
- Location: Golf Lane, Aldeburgh, Suffolk, England

Site notes
- Governing body: Britten-Pears Foundation

Listed Building – Grade II
- Designated: 27 February 1950
- Reference no.: 1269711

The Red House, in the coastal town of Aldeburgh, Suffolk, England, was the home of the composer Benjamin Britten, from 1957 until his death in 1976, and of his partner, Peter Pears, until the latter's death in 1986. It is now one of two headquarters for Britten Pears Arts, with the other being Snape Maltings Concert Hall.

== History ==
The origins of the house are late-17th century when the building was a farmhouse. Extended in the three subsequent centuries, it was bought in 1951 by the writer Stephen Potter and his wife, the painter Mary Potter. Following the Potters' divorce and Stephen Potter's departure from Aldeburgh, Mary Potter and Britten exchanged houses in 1957, Potter taking Crag House, which Britten had bought in 1947. Britten lived at the house as his main residence until his death in 1976; after Pears' death a decade later, it was established as the base for the Britten-Pears Foundation. The Britten-Pears Foundation reinstated Britten's grand piano to the first-floor studio in the Red House grounds as part of a £4.7 million restoration project in 2013. The Foundation promotes Britten and Pears' music legacy, and the buildings and grounds at The Red House serve this end, being open to the public and the setting for an archive of Britten's work, exhibition spaces, and a centre for music research. The Foundation also manages the house and the associated art collection, including sculpture by Geoffrey Clarke and Georg Ehrlich. The art collection, comprising some 1,300 works, is predominately that built up by Britten and Pears, although the Foundation has made acquisitions of its own, either of art relating to Britten's work, or of artists influenced by him.

== Architecture ==
The original farmhouse was constructed of red brick, on a timber frame in the late 17th century. Extensions in the 18th and 19th centuries created a house of a double-pile plan, with two storeys and three bays. Further extensions were made in the twentieth century during Britten's ownership, and subsequently by the Britten-Pears Foundation. These include a porch by Peter Collymore from 1967, studios by Collymore and by H. T. Cadbury-Brown from the 1950s and 1960s, an Exhibition Gallery from 1993 and an Archive Building from 2011-13 by Stanton Williams.

== Sources ==
- Bettley, James; Pevsner, Nikolaus (2015). Suffolk: East. The Buildings of England. Yale University Press. ISBN 978-0-300-19654-2. OCLC 910928847.
