= Cello Symphony (Britten) =

Symphony by Benjamin Britten

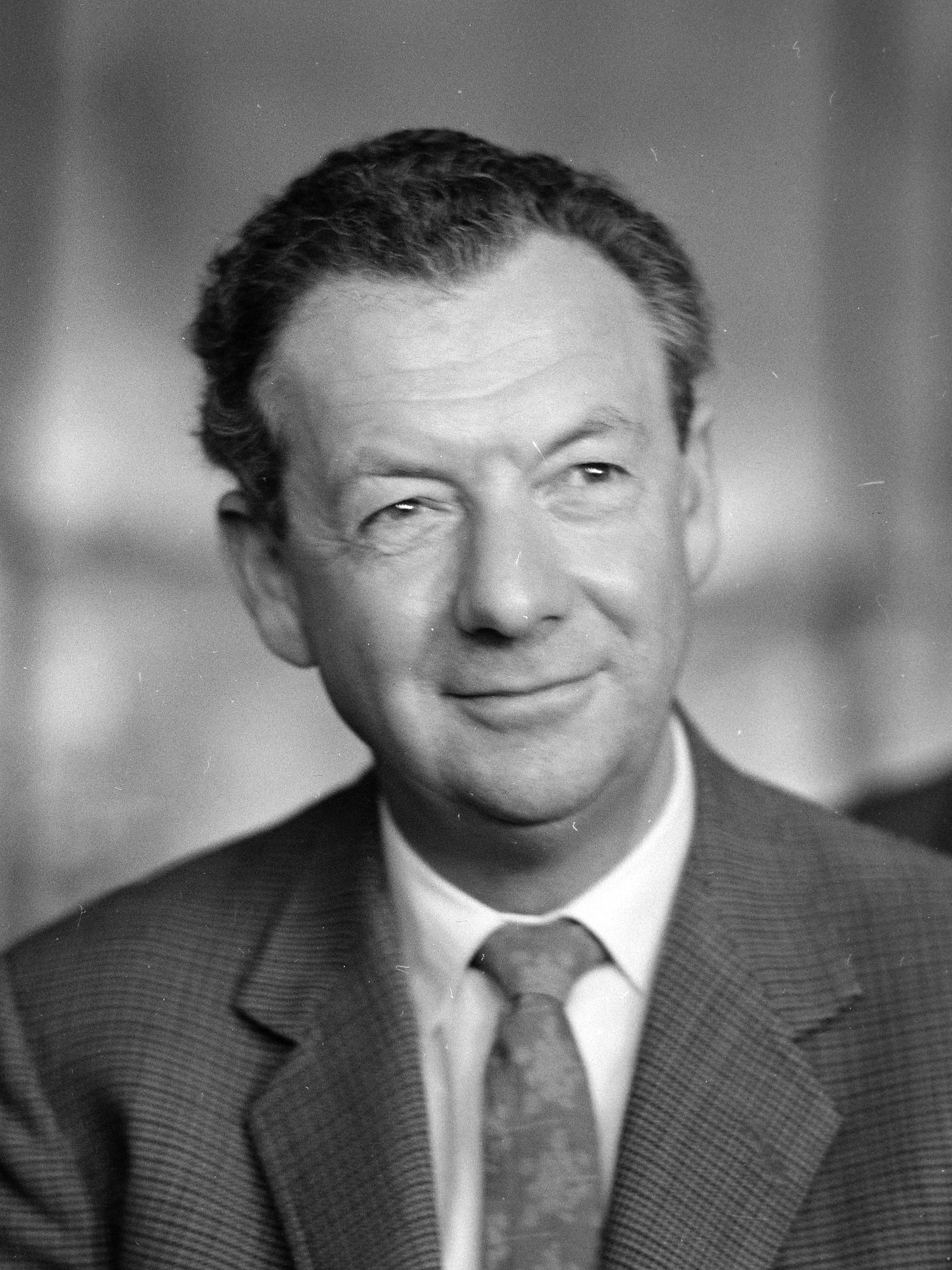
Benjamin Britten in 1965

The Symphony for Cello and Orchestra or Cello Symphony, Op. 68, was written in 1963 by the British composer Benjamin Britten. He dedicated the work to Mstislav Rostropovich, who gave the work its premiere in Moscow with the composer and the Moscow Philharmonic Orchestra on 12 March 1964. The work's title reflects the music's more even balance between soloist and orchestra than in the traditional concerto format.

The piece is in the four-movement structure typical of a symphony, but the final two movements are linked by a cello cadenza:

1. Allegro maestoso
2. Presto inquieto
3. Adagio – cadenza ad lib
4. Passacaglia: Andante allegro
