= Paul Kildea =

Australian conductor and author

Paul Francis Kildea is an Australian conductor and author, considered an expert on Benjamin Britten.

== Life ==
Paul Francis Kildea was born and raised in Narrabundah, Canberra, and attended St Edmund's College, Narrabundah, where his piano teacher was Keith Radford. He studied piano and musicology at the University of Melbourne where he met the musicologist Malcolm Gillies. Kildea's 2013 book, Benjamin Britten: A Life in the Twentieth Century, is dedicated "For two teachers, Malcolm and Keith", a nod to Gillies and Radford. He also gained a doctorate from the University of Oxford. His doctoral thesis was published as Selling Britten (2002). The filming rights to Kildea's 2018 book, Chopin's Piano, have been acquired by Donald Rosenfeld of Sovereign Films; Daniil Trifonov is slated to perform Chopin's music.

He was associated with Opera Australia, becoming assistant conductor to Simone Young after his 1997 conducting debut with Leoš Janáček's The Cunning Little Vixen.

Kildea was head of music for the Aldeburgh Festival 1999–2002, and artistic director of Wigmore Hall 2003–05.

From 2014 until 2016 he served as artistic director of the biennial Four Winds Festival in Bermagui on the New South Wales South Coast. In 2019 he was appointed artistic director of Musica Viva Australia.

Kildea resides in Melbourne, Australia.

== Bibliography ==
- Britten: Selling Britten (2002)
- Britten on Music (2003)
- Benjamin Britten: A Life in the Twentieth Century (2013)
- Chopin's Piano (2018)
