= Benjamin Britten =

English composer and pianist (1913–1976)

The Right Honourable The Lord Britten OM CH
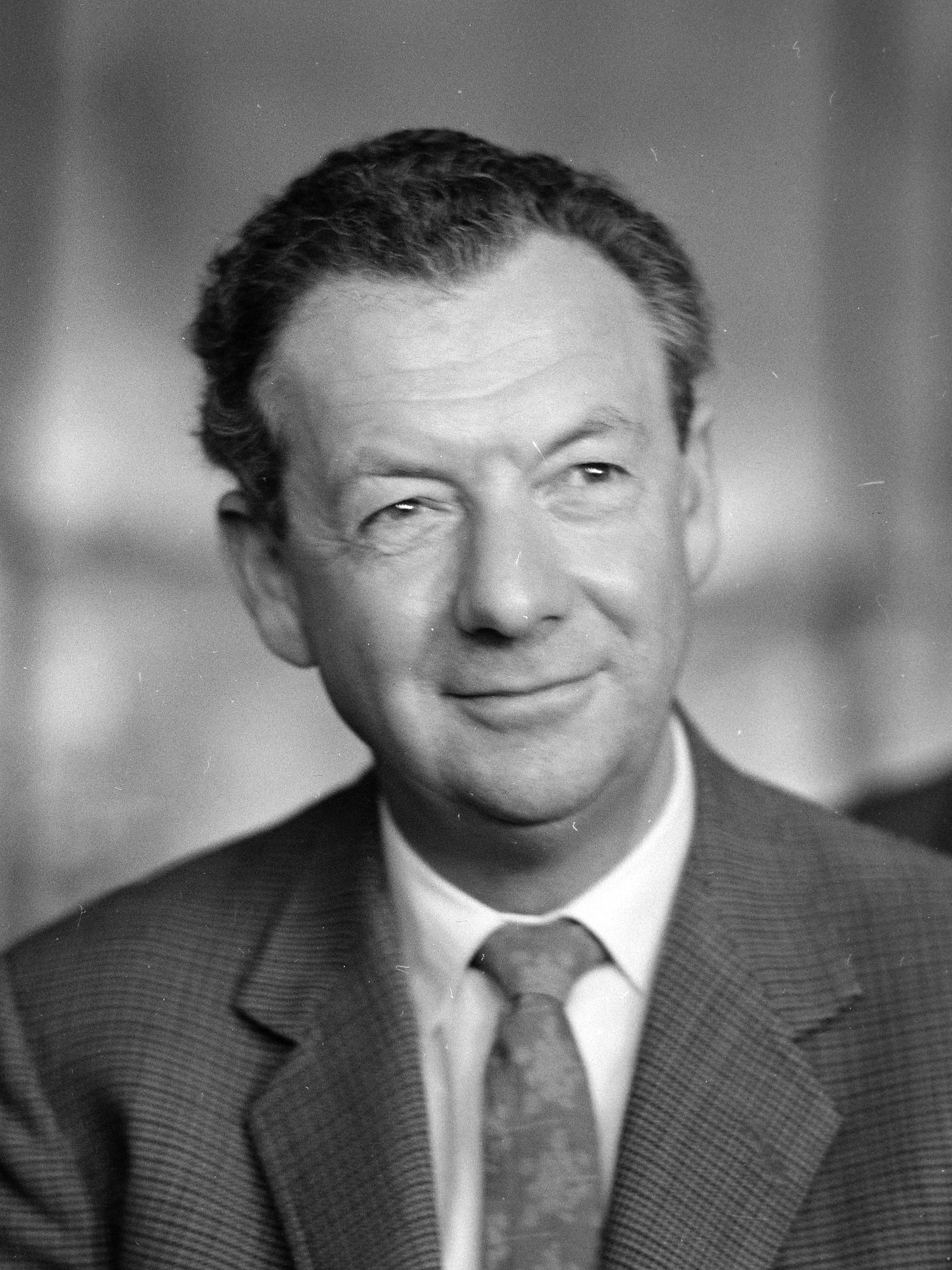
- Britten in 1965
- Born: 22 November 1913; Lowestoft, Suffolk, England
- Died: 4 December 1976 (aged 63); Aldeburgh, Suffolk, England
- Works: List of compositions
- Partner: Peter Pears

Edward Benjamin Britten, Baron Britten (22 November 1913 – 4 December 1976) was an English composer, conductor, and pianist. He was a central figure of 20th-century British music, with a range of works including opera, other vocal music, orchestral and chamber pieces. His best-known works include the opera Peter Grimes (1945), the War Requiem (1962) and the orchestral showpiece The Young Person's Guide to the Orchestra (1945).

Britten was born in Lowestoft, Suffolk, the son of a dentist. He showed talent from an early age. He studied at the Royal College of Music in London and privately with the composer Frank Bridge. Britten first came to public attention with the a cappella choral work A Boy Was Born in 1934. With the premiere of Peter Grimes in 1945, he leapt to international fame. Over the next 28 years, he wrote 14 more operas, establishing himself as one of the leading 20th-century composers in the genre. In addition to large-scale operas for Sadler's Wells and Covent Garden, he wrote chamber operas for small forces; among the best known of these is The Turn of the Screw (1954). Recurring themes in his operas include the struggle of an outsider against a hostile society and the corruption of innocence.

Britten's other works range from orchestral to choral, solo vocal, chamber and instrumental as well as film music. He took a great interest in writing music for children and amateur performers, including the opera Noye's Fludde, a Missa Brevis, and the song collection Friday Afternoons. He often composed with particular performers in mind. His most frequent and important muse was his personal and professional partner, the tenor Peter Pears; others included Kathleen Ferrier, Jennifer Vyvyan, Janet Baker, Dennis Brain, Julian Bream, Dietrich Fischer-Dieskau, Osian Ellis and Mstislav Rostropovich. Britten was a celebrated pianist and conductor, performing many of his own works in concert and on record. He also performed and recorded works by others, such as Bach's Brandenburg Concertos, Mozart symphonies, and song cycles by Schubert and Schumann.

Together with Pears and the librettist and producer Eric Crozier, Britten founded the annual Aldeburgh Festival in 1948, and he was responsible for the creation of Snape Maltings concert hall in 1967. In 1976, he was the first composer to be given a life peerage. He died shortly afterwards, aged 63.

== Early years ==
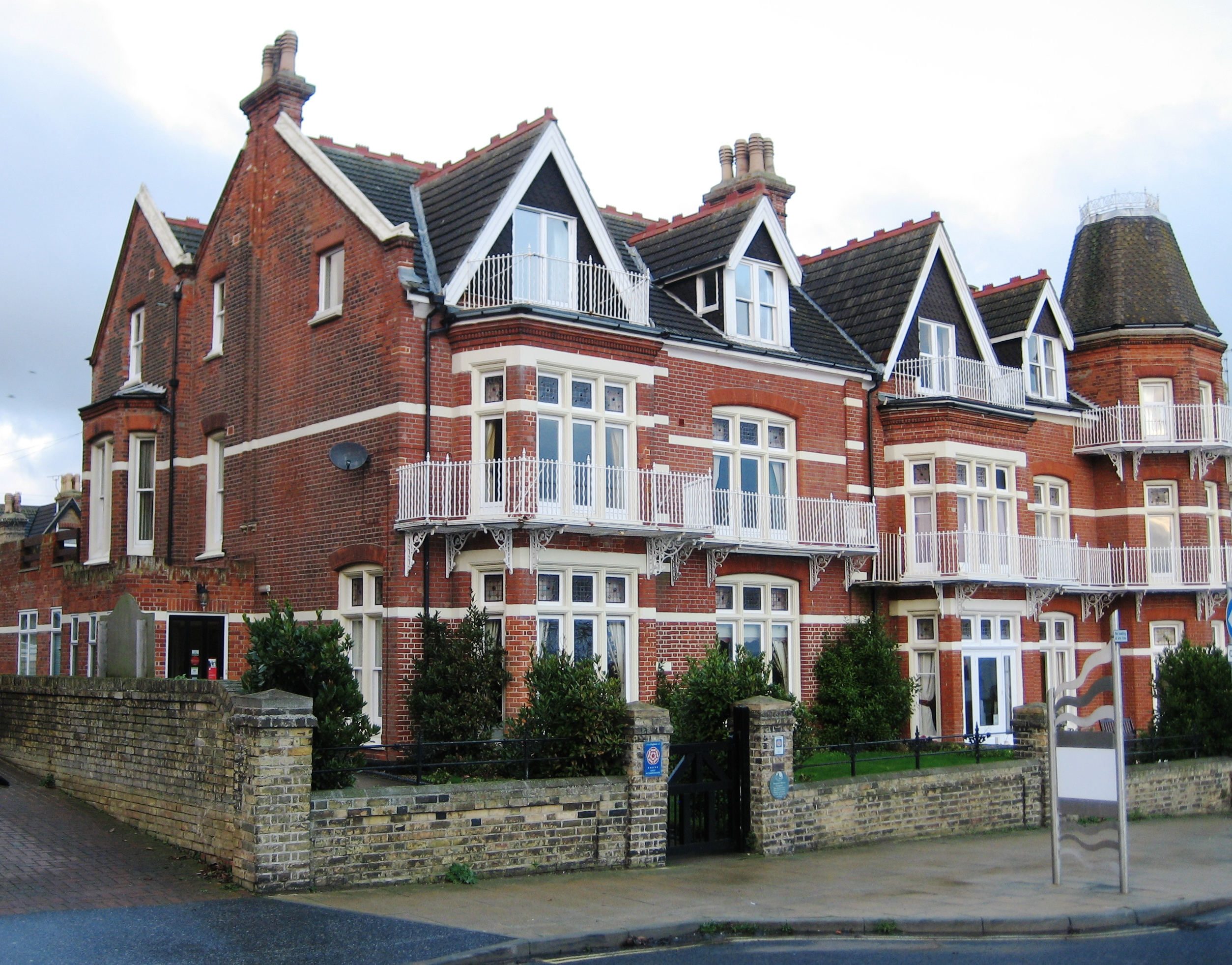
Britten's birthplace in Lowestoft, which was the Britten family home for more than twenty years

Britten was born in the fishing port of Lowestoft in Suffolk, on the east coast of England on 22 November 1913, the feast day of Saint Cecilia, the patron saint of music. He was the youngest of four children of Robert Victor Britten and his wife Edith Rhoda, née Hockey. (Note: Britten's siblings were (Edith) Barbara (born 1902), Robert Harry Marsh ("Bobby", 1907), and (Charlotte) Elizabeth ("Beth", 1909).) Robert Britten's youthful ambition to become a farmer had been thwarted by lack of capital, and he had instead trained as a dentist, a profession he practised successfully but without pleasure. While studying at Charing Cross Hospital in London he met Edith Hockey, the daughter of a civil service clerk in the British Government's Home Office. They were married in September 1901 at St John's, Smith Square, London.

The consensus among biographers of Britten is that his father was a loving but somewhat stern and remote parent. Britten, according to his sister Beth, "got on well with him and shared his wry sense of humour, dedication to work and capacity for taking pains." Edith Britten was a talented amateur musician and secretary of the Lowestoft Musical Society. In the English provinces of the early 20th century, distinctions of social class were taken very seriously. Britten described his family as "very ordinary middle class", but there were aspects of the Brittens that were not ordinary: Edith's father was illegitimate, and her mother was an alcoholic; Robert Britten was an agnostic and refused to attend church on Sundays. Music was the principal means by which Edith Britten strove to maintain the family's social standing, inviting the pillars of the local community to musical soirées at the house.

When Britten was three months old he contracted pneumonia and nearly died. The illness left him with a damaged heart, and doctors warned his parents that he would probably never be able to lead a normal life. He recovered more fully than expected, and as a boy was a keen tennis player and cricketer. To his mother's great delight he was an outstandingly musical child, unlike his sisters, who inherited their father's indifference to music, while his brother, Robert, though musically talented, was interested only in ragtime. Edith gave the young Britten his first lessons in piano and notation. He made his first attempts at composition when he was five. He started piano lessons when he was seven years old, and three years later began to play the viola. At home he heard only live music; his father refused to have a gramophone or a radio in the house.

== Education ==
=== Lowestoft ===
When he was seven Britten was sent to a dame school, run by the Misses Astle. The younger sister, Ethel, gave him piano lessons; in later life he said that he remained grateful for the excellence of her teaching. The following year he moved on to a prep school, South Lodge, Lowestoft, as a day boy. The headmaster, Thomas Sewell, was an old-fashioned disciplinarian; the young Britten was outraged at the severe corporal punishments frequently handed out, and later he said that his lifelong pacifism probably had its roots in his reaction to the regime at the school. He himself rarely fell foul of Sewell, a mathematician, in which subject Britten was a star pupil. The school had no musical tradition, and Britten continued to study the piano with Ethel Astle. From the age of ten he took viola lessons from a friend of his mother, Audrey Alston, who had been a professional player before her marriage. In his spare time he composed prolifically. When his Simple Symphony, based on these juvenilia, was recorded in 1956, Britten wrote this pen-portrait of his young self for the sleeve note:

Once upon a time there was a prep-school boy. ... He was quite an ordinary little boy ... he loved cricket, only quite liked football (although he kicked a pretty "corner"); he adored mathematics, got on all right with history, was scared by Latin Unseen; he behaved fairly well, only ragged the recognised amount, so that his contacts with the cane or the slipper were happily rare (although one nocturnal expedition to stalk ghosts left its marks behind); he worked his way up the school slowly and steadily, until at the age of thirteen he reached that pinnacle of importance and grandeur, never to be quite equalled in later days: the head of the Sixth, head-prefect, and Victor Ludorum. But – there was one curious thing about this boy: he wrote music. His friends bore with it, his enemies kicked a bit but not for long (he was quite tough), the staff couldn't object if his work and games didn't suffer. He wrote lots of it, reams and reams of it.

Frank Bridge, Britten's teacher (photographed in 1921)

Audrey Alston encouraged Britten to go to symphony concerts in Norwich. At one of these, during the triennial Norfolk and Norwich Festival in October 1924, he heard Frank Bridge's orchestral poem The Sea, conducted by the composer. It was the first substantial piece of modern music he had ever encountered, and he was, in his own phrase, "knocked sideways" by it. Audrey Alston was a friend of Bridge; when he returned to Norwich for the next festival in 1927 she brought her not quite 14-year-old pupil to meet him. Bridge was impressed with the boy, and after they had gone through some of Britten's compositions together he invited him to come to London to take lessons from him. Robert Britten, supported by Thomas Sewell, doubted the wisdom of pursuing a composing career; a compromise was agreed by which Britten would, as planned, go on to his public school the following year but would make regular day-trips to London to study composition with Bridge and piano with his colleague Harold Samuel.

Bridge impressed on Britten the importance of scrupulous attention to the technical craft of composing (Note: Britten later gave an example of the detailed skill instilled in him by Bridge: "I came up with a series of major sevenths on the violin. Bridge was against this, saying that the instrument didn't vibrate properly with this interval: it should be divided between two instruments.") and the maxim that "you should find yourself and be true to what you found." The earliest substantial works Britten composed while studying with Bridge are the String Quartet in F, completed in April 1928, and the Quatre Chansons Françaises, a song-cycle for high voice and orchestra. Authorities differ on the extent of Bridge's influence on his pupil's technique. Humphrey Carpenter and Michael Oliver judge that Britten's abilities as an orchestrator were essentially self-taught; Donald Mitchell considers that Bridge had an important influence on the cycle.

=== Public school and Royal College of Music ===
Early influences, clockwise from top left: Mahler, Ireland, Shostakovich, Stravinsky

In September 1928 Britten went as a boarder to Gresham's School, in Holt, Norfolk. At the time he felt unhappy there, even writing in his diary of contemplating suicide or running away: he hated being separated from his family, most particularly from his mother; he despised the music master; and he was shocked at the prevalence of bullying, though he was not the target of it. (Note: When it came to leaving Gresham's, Britten found it a wrench, confessing: "I am terribly sorry to leave such boys as these. [...] I didn't think I should be so sorry to leave." In his later years, Britten helped secure a place at the school for David Hemmings,) He remained there for two years and in 1930 he won a composition scholarship at the Royal College of Music (RCM) in London; his examiners were the composers John Ireland and Ralph Vaughan Williams and the college's harmony and counterpoint teacher, S. P. Waddington.

Britten was at the RCM from 1930 to 1933, studying composition with Ireland and piano with Arthur Benjamin. He won the Sullivan Prize for composition, the Cobbett Competition for chamber music, and was twice winner of the Ernest Farrar Prize for composition. Despite these honours, he was not greatly impressed by the establishment: he found his fellow-students "amateurish and folksy" and the staff "inclined to suspect technical brilliance of being superficial and insincere." (Note: This academic mistrust of Britten's technical skills persisted. In 1994 the critic Derrick Puffett wrote that in the 1960s Britten was still regarded with suspicion on account of his technical expertise; Puffett quoted remarks by the Professor of Music at Oxford in the 1960s, Sir Jack Westrup, to the effect that Britten was to be distrusted for his "superficial effects", whereas Tippett was considered "awkward and technically unskilled but somehow authentic.") Another Ireland pupil, the composer Humphrey Searle, said that Ireland could be "an inspiring teacher to those on his own wavelength"; Britten was not, and learned little from him. He continued to study privately with Bridge, although he later praised Ireland for "nurs[ing] me very gently through a very, very difficult musical adolescence."

Britten also used his time in London to attend concerts and become better acquainted with the music of Stravinsky, Shostakovich and, most particularly, Mahler. (Note: Britten later wrote about his youthful discovery of Mahler that he had been told that the composer was "long-winded and formless ... a romantic self-indulgent, who was so infatuated with his ideas that he could never stop. Either he couldn't score at all, or he could only score like Wagner, using enormous orchestras with so much going on that you couldn't hear anything clearly. Above all, he was not original. In other words, nothing for a young student!" Britten judged, on the contrary, "His influence on contemporary writing ... could only be beneficial. His style is free from excessive personal mannerisms, and his scores are models of how the modern virtuoso orchestra should be used, nothing being left to chance and every note sounding.") He intended postgraduate study in Vienna with Alban Berg, Arnold Schoenberg's student, but was eventually dissuaded by his parents, on the advice of the RCM staff.

The first of Britten's compositions to attract wide attention were composed while at the RCM: the Sinfonietta, Op. 1 (1932), the oboe quartet Phantasy, Op. 2, dedicated to Léon Goossens who played the first performance in a BBC broadcast on 6 August 1933, and a set of choral variations A Boy Was Born, written in 1933 for the BBC Singers, who first performed it the following year. In this same period he wrote Friday Afternoons, a collection of 12 songs for the pupils of Clive House School, Prestatyn, where his brother was headmaster.

== Career ==
=== Early professional life ===
In February 1935, at Bridge's instigation, Britten was invited to a job interview by the BBC's director of music Adrian Boult and his assistant Edward Clark. Britten was not enthusiastic about the prospect of working full-time in the BBC music department and was relieved when what came out of the interview was an invitation to write the score for a documentary film, The King's Stamp, directed by Alberto Cavalcanti for the GPO Film Unit.

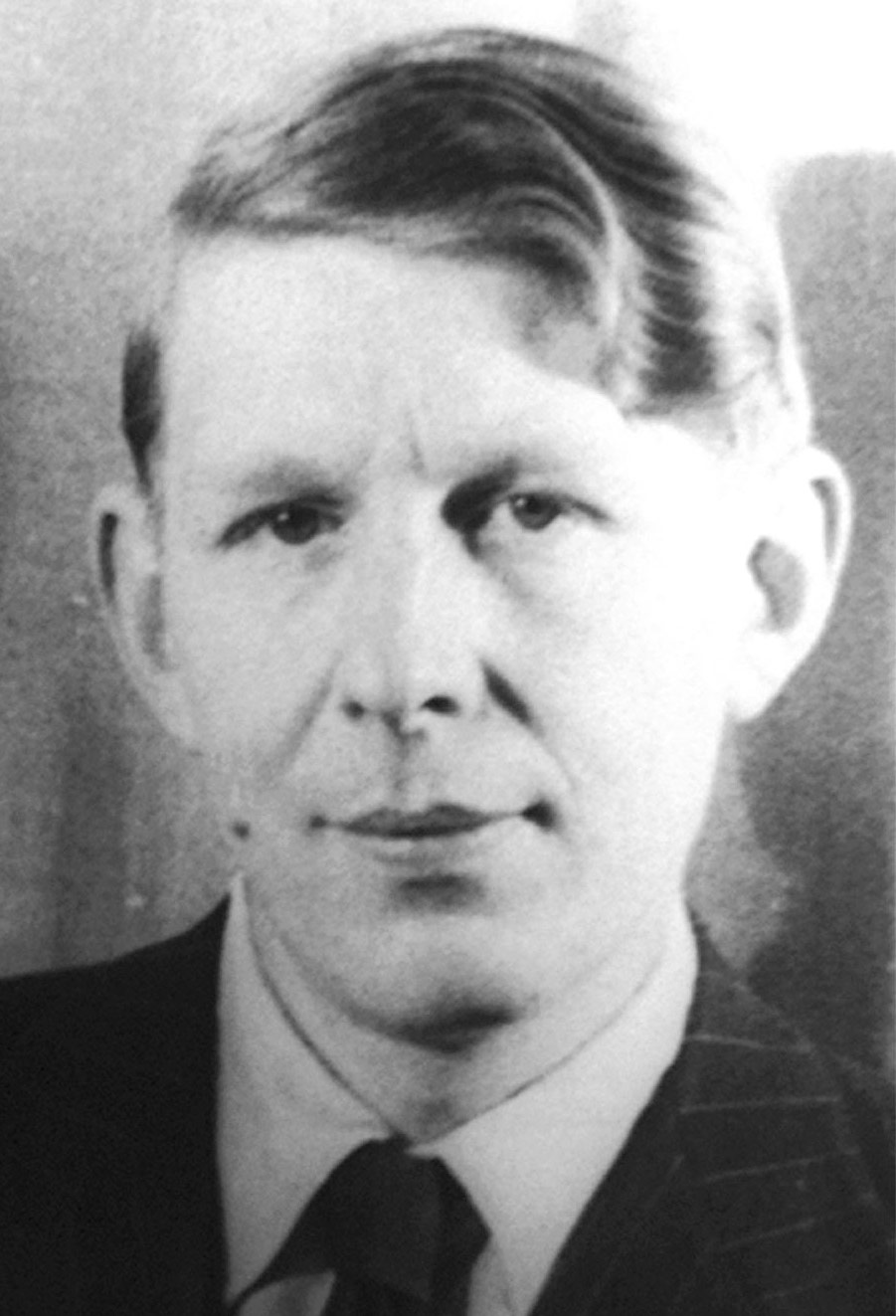
W. H. Auden in 1939

Britten became a member of the film unit's small group of regular contributors, another of whom was W. H. Auden. Together they worked on the documentary films Coal Face and Night Mail in 1935. They also collaborated on the song cycle Our Hunting Fathers (1936), radical both in politics and musical treatment, and subsequently other works including Cabaret Songs, On This Island, Paul Bunyan and Hymn to St Cecilia. Auden was a considerable influence on Britten, encouraging him to widen his aesthetic, intellectual and political horizons, and also to come to terms with his homosexuality. Auden was, as David Matthews puts it, "cheerfully and guiltlessly promiscuous"; Britten, puritanical and conventional by nature, was sexually repressed.

In the three years from 1935 to 1937 Britten wrote nearly 40 scores for the theatre, cinema and radio. Among the film music of the late 1930s Matthews singles out Night Mail and Love from a Stranger (1937); from the theatre music he selects for mention The Ascent of F6 (1936), On the Frontier (1938), and Johnson Over Jordan (1939); and of the music for radio, King Arthur (1937) and The Sword in the Stone (1939).

In 1937 there were two events of huge importance in Britten's life: his mother died, and he met the tenor Peter Pears. Although Britten was extraordinarily devoted to his mother and was devastated at her death, it also seems to have been something of a liberation for him. Only after that did he begin to engage in emotional relationships with people his own age or younger. Later in the year he got to know Pears while they were both helping to clear out the country cottage of a mutual friend who had died in an air crash. Pears quickly became Britten's musical inspiration and close (though for the moment platonic) friend. Britten's first work for him was composed within weeks of their meeting, a setting of Emily Brontë's poem, "A thousand gleaming fires", for tenor and strings.

During 1937 Britten composed a Pacifist March to words by Ronald Duncan for the Peace Pledge Union, of which, as a pacifist, he had become an active member; the work was not a success and was soon withdrawn. The best known of his compositions from this period is probably Variations on a Theme of Frank Bridge for string orchestra, described by Matthews as the first of Britten's works to become a popular classic. It was a success in North America, with performances in Toronto, New York, Boston, Chicago and San Francisco, under conductors including John Barbirolli and Serge Koussevitzky.

=== America 1939–42 ===
In April 1939 Britten and Pears sailed to North America, going first to Canada and then to New York. They had several reasons for leaving England, including the difficult position of pacifists in an increasingly bellicose Europe; the success that Frank Bridge had enjoyed in the US; the departure of Auden and his friend Christopher Isherwood to the US from England three months previously; hostile or belittling reviews of Britten's music in the English press; and under-rehearsed and inadequate performances. Britten and Pears consummated their relationship and from then until Britten's death they were partners in both their professional and personal lives. When the Second World War began, Britten and Pears turned for advice to the British embassy in Washington and were told that they should remain in the US as artistic ambassadors. Pears was inclined to disregard the advice and go back to England; Britten also felt the urge to return, but accepted the embassy's counsel and persuaded Pears to do the same.

Already a friend of the composer Aaron Copland, Britten encountered his latest works Billy the Kid and An Outdoor Overture, both of which influenced his own music. In 1940 Britten composed Seven Sonnets of Michelangelo, the first of many song cycles for Pears. Britten's orchestral works from this period include the Violin Concerto, Sinfonia da Requiem, and An American Overture. In 1941 Britten produced his first music drama, Paul Bunyan, an operetta, to a libretto by Auden. While in the US, Britten had his first encounter with Balinese gamelan music, through transcriptions for piano duo made by the Canadian composer Colin McPhee. The two met in the summer of 1939 and subsequently performed a number of McPhee's transcriptions for a recording. This musical encounter bore fruit in several Balinese-inspired works later in Britten's career.

Moving to the US did not relieve Britten of the nuisance of hostile criticism: although both Olin Downes, the doyen of New York music critics, and Irving Kolodin took to Britten's music, Virgil Thomson was, as the music scholar Suzanne Robinson puts it, consistently "severe and spiteful". Thomson described Les Illuminations (1940) as "little more than a series of bromidic and facile 'effects' ... pretentious, banal and utterly disappointing", and was equally unflattering about Pears's voice. Robinson surmises that Thomson was motivated by "a mixture of spite, national pride, and professional jealousy." Paul Bunyan met with wholesale critical disapproval, and the Sinfonia da Requiem (already rejected by its Japanese sponsors because of its overtly Christian nature) received a mixed reception when Barbirolli and the New York Philharmonic premiered it in March 1941. The reputation of the work was much enhanced when Koussevitzky took it up shortly afterwards.

=== Return to England ===
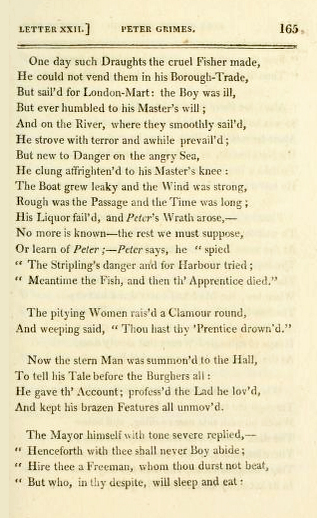
Page from "Peter Grimes" in 1812 edition of Crabbe's The Borough

In 1942 Britten read the work of the poet George Crabbe for the first time. The Borough, set on the Suffolk coast close to Britten's homeland, awakened in him such longings for England that he knew he must return. He also knew that he must write an opera based on Crabbe's poem about the fisherman Peter Grimes. Before Britten left the US, Koussevitzky, always generous in encouraging new talent, offered him a $1,000 commission to write the opera. (Note: Koussevitzky's generosity later extended to waiving his rights to mount the first production, allowing Britten and his Sadler's Wells associates the chance to do so. The opera's first performance under Koussevitzky's aegis was at the Tanglewood Music Festival in 1947, conducted by the young Leonard Bernstein. Bernstein retained a love of the work, and he conducted the orchestral "Sea Interludes" from the opera at his final concert, given in Tanglewood in 1990, shortly before his death.) Britten and Pears returned to England in April 1942. During the long transatlantic sea crossing Britten completed the choral works A Ceremony of Carols and Hymn to St Cecilia. The latter was his last large-scale collaboration with Auden. Britten had grown away from him, and Auden became one of the composer's so-called "corpses" – former intimates from whom he completely cut off contact once they had outlived their usefulness to him or offended him in some way.

Having arrived in Britain, Britten and Pears applied for recognition as conscientious objectors; Britten was initially allowed only non-combatant service in the military, but on appeal he gained unconditional exemption. After the death of his mother in 1937 he had used money she bequeathed him to buy the Old Mill in Snape, Suffolk which became his country home. He spent much of his time there in 1944 working on the opera Peter Grimes. Pears joined Sadler's Wells Opera Company, whose artistic director, the singer Joan Cross, announced her intention to re-open the company's home base in London with Britten's opera, casting herself and Pears in the leading roles. (Note: Sadler's Wells Theatre in Islington, London, was requisitioned by the government in 1942 as a refuge for people made homeless by air-raids; the Sadler's Wells opera company toured the British provinces, returning to its home base in June 1945.) There were complaints from company members about supposed favouritism and the "cacophony" of Britten's score, as well as some ill-suppressed homophobic remarks. Peter Grimes opened in June 1945 and was hailed by public and critics; its box-office takings matched or exceeded those for La bohème and Madame Butterfly, which were staged during the same season. The opera administrator Lord Harewood called it "the first genuinely successful British opera, Gilbert and Sullivan apart, since Purcell." Dismayed by the in-fighting among the company, Cross, Britten and Pears severed their ties with Sadler's Wells in December 1945, going on to found what was to become the English Opera Group.

A month after the opening of Peter Grimes, Britten and Yehudi Menuhin went to Germany to give recitals to concentration camp survivors. What they saw, at Belsen most of all, so shocked Britten that he refused to talk about it until towards the end of his life, when he told Pears that it had coloured everything he had written since. Colin Matthews comments that the next two works Britten composed after his return, the song-cycle The Holy Sonnets of John Donne and the Second String Quartet, contrast strongly with earlier, lighter-hearted works such as Les Illuminations. Britten recovered his joie de vivre for The Young Person's Guide to the Orchestra (1945), written for an educational film, Instruments of the Orchestra, directed by Muir Mathieson and featuring the London Symphony Orchestra conducted by Malcolm Sargent. It became, and remained, his most often played and popular work.

Britten's next opera, The Rape of Lucretia, was presented at the first post-war Glyndebourne Festival in 1946. It was then taken on tour to provincial cities under the banner of the "Glyndebourne English Opera Company", an uneasy alliance of Britten and his associates with John Christie, the autocratic proprietor of Glyndebourne. The tour lost money heavily, and Christie announced that he would underwrite no more tours. Britten and his associates set up the English Opera Group; the librettist Eric Crozier and the designer John Piper joined Britten as artistic directors. The group's express purpose was to produce and commission new English operas and other works, presenting them throughout the country. Britten wrote the comic opera Albert Herring for the group in 1947; while on tour in the new work Pears came up with the idea of mounting a festival in the small Suffolk seaside town of Aldeburgh, where Britten had moved from Snape earlier in the year, and which became his principal place of residence for the rest of his life.

=== Aldeburgh; the 1950s ===
The Aldeburgh Festival was launched in June 1948, with Britten, Pears, and Crozier directing. Albert Herring played at the Jubilee Hall, and Britten's new cantata for tenor, chorus, and orchestra, Saint Nicolas, was presented in the parish church. The festival was an immediate success and became an annual event that has continued into the 21st century. New works by Britten featured in almost every festival until his death in 1976, including the premieres of his operas A Midsummer Night's Dream at the Jubilee Hall in 1960 and Death in Venice at Snape Maltings Concert Hall in 1973.

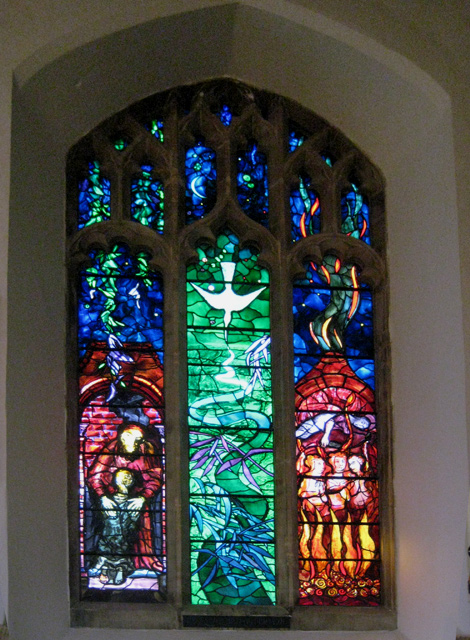
John Piper's Benjamin Britten memorial window in the Church of St Peter and St Paul, Aldeburgh

Unlike many leading English composers, Britten was not known as a teacher, (Note: Sullivan, Parry, Stanford, Elgar, Vaughan Williams, Holst and Tippett were among the leading British composers of their time who held posts at conservatoires or universities. Those who, like Britten, were not known for teaching included Delius and Walton.) but in 1949 he accepted his only private pupil, Arthur Oldham, who studied with him for three years. Oldham made himself useful, acting as musical assistant and arranging Variations on a Theme by Frank Bridge for full orchestra for the Frederick Ashton ballet Le Rêve de Léonor (1949), but he later described the teacher–pupil relationship as "beneficial five per cent to [Britten] and ninety-five per cent to me!"

Throughout the 1950s Britten continued to write operas. Billy Budd (1951) was well received at its Covent Garden premiere and was regarded by reviewers as an advance on Peter Grimes. Gloriana (1953), written to mark the coronation of Elizabeth II, had a cool reception at the gala premiere in the presence of the Queen and the British Establishment en masse. The downbeat story of Elizabeth I in her decline, and Britten's score – reportedly thought by members of the premiere's audience "too modern" for such a gala – did not overcome what Matthews calls the "ingrained philistinism" of the ruling classes. (Note: The critic Andrew Porter wrote at the time: "The audience naturally contained many people distinguished in political and social spheres rather than noted for their appreciation of twentieth-century music, and Gloriana was not well received at its first hearing. The usual philistine charges brought against it, as against so much contemporary music ('no tunes – ugly, discordant sounds', and the rest), are beneath consideration. On the other hand, those who found Gloriana ill-suited to the occasion may be allowed to have some right on their side.") Although Gloriana did well at the box office, there were no further productions in Britain for another 13 years. It was later recognised as one of Britten's finer operas. The Turn of the Screw the following year was an unqualified success; together with Peter Grimes it became, and at 2013 remained, one of the two most frequently performed of Britten's operas.

In the 1950s the "fervently anti-homosexual" Home Secretary, Sir David Maxwell Fyfe, urged the police to enforce the Victorian laws making homosexual acts illegal. (Note: The principal law against homosexual acts was the Criminal Law Amendment Act 1885, in which Section 11 made any kind of sexual activity between men illegal for the first time. It was not repealed until the passage of the Sexual Offences Act 1967) Britten and Pears came under scrutiny; Britten was visited by police officers in 1953 and was so perturbed that he discussed with his assistant Imogen Holst the possibility that Pears might have to enter a sham marriage (with whom is unclear). In the end nothing was done.

An increasingly important influence on Britten was the music of the East, an interest that was fostered by a tour there with Pears in 1956, when Britten once again encountered the music of the Balinese gamelan and saw for the first time Japanese Noh plays, which he called "some of the most wonderful drama I have ever seen." These eastern influences were seen and heard in the ballet The Prince of the Pagodas (1957) and later in two of the three semi-operatic "Parables for Church Performance": Curlew River (1964), The Burning Fiery Furnace (1966) and The Prodigal Son (1968).

He was invited to a competition to compose the future anthem of the Federation of Malaya (now Malaysia) in 1956. He attempted a composition after several couple of days which he described as "curious" and "unsuccessful". The committee returned the score with suggestions that he could make it "sound more Malaysian", but to no avail.

=== 1960s ===
By the 1960s, the Aldeburgh Festival was outgrowing its customary venues, and plans to build a new concert hall in Aldeburgh were not progressing. When redundant Victorian maltings buildings in the village of Snape, six miles inland, became available for hire, Britten realised that the largest of them could be converted into a concert hall and opera house. The 830-seat Snape Maltings hall was opened by the Queen at the start of the twentieth Aldeburgh Festival on 2 June 1967; it was immediately hailed as one of the best concert halls in the country. The hall was destroyed by fire in 1969, but Britten was determined that it would be rebuilt in time for the following year's festival, which it was. The Queen again attended the opening performance in 1970.

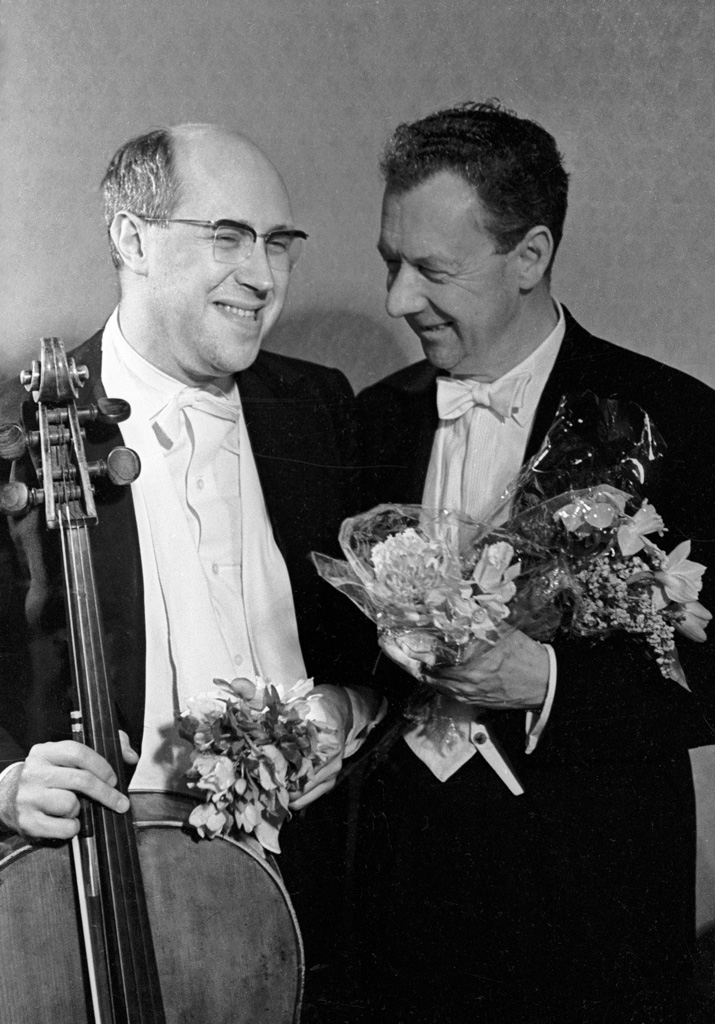
Mstislav Rostropovich and Britten, 1964

The Maltings gave the festival a venue that could comfortably house large orchestral works and operas. Britten conducted the first performance outside Russia of Shostakovich's Fourteenth Symphony at Snape in 1970. Shostakovich, a friend since 1960, dedicated the symphony to Britten; he was himself the dedicatee of The Prodigal Son. Two other Russian musicians who were close to Britten and regularly performed at the festival were the pianist Sviatoslav Richter and the cellist Mstislav Rostropovich. Britten composed his cello suites, Cello Symphony and Cello Sonata for Rostropovich, who premiered them at the Aldeburgh Festival.

One of the best known of Britten's works, the War Requiem, was premiered in 1962. He had been asked four years earlier to write a work for the consecration of the new Coventry Cathedral, a modernist building designed by Basil Spence. The old cathedral had been left in ruins by an air-raid on the city in 1940 in which hundreds of people died. Britten decided that his work would commemorate the dead of both World Wars in a large-scale score for soloists, chorus, chamber ensemble and orchestra. His text interspersed the traditional Requiem Mass with poems by Wilfred Owen. Matthews writes, "With the War Requiem Britten reached the apex of his reputation: it was almost universally hailed as a masterpiece." Shostakovich told Rostropovich that he believed it to be "the greatest work of the twentieth century".

In 1967 the BBC commissioned Britten to write an opera specially for television. Owen Wingrave was based, like The Turn of the Screw, on a ghost story by Henry James. By the 1960s Britten found composition much slower than in his prolific youth; he told the 28-year-old composer Nicholas Maw, "Get as much done now as you can, because it gets much, much more difficult as you grow older." He did not complete the score of the new opera until August 1970. Owen Wingrave was first broadcast in Britain in May 1971, when it was also televised in Austria, Belgium, Denmark, France, Germany, Ireland, the Netherlands, Norway, Sweden, Switzerland, the US and Yugoslavia.

=== Last years ===
In September 1970 Britten asked Myfanwy Piper, who had adapted the two Henry James stories for him, to turn another prose story into a libretto. This was Thomas Mann's novella Death in Venice, a subject he had been considering for some time. At an early stage in composition Britten was told by his doctors that a heart operation was essential if he was to live for more than two years. He was determined to finish the opera and worked urgently to complete it before going into hospital for surgery. His long-term colleague Colin Graham wrote:

Perhaps of all his works, this one went deepest into Britten's own soul: there are extraordinary cross-currents of affinity between himself, his own state of health and mind, Thomas Mann, Aschenbach (Mann's dying protagonist), and Peter Pears, who must have had to tear himself in three in order to reconstitute himself as the principal character.

After the completion of the opera Britten went into the National Heart Hospital and was operated on in May 1973 to replace a failing heart valve. The replacement was successful, but he suffered a slight stroke, affecting his right hand. This brought his career as a performer to an end. While in hospital Britten became friendly with a senior nursing sister, Rita Thomson; she moved to Aldeburgh in 1974 and looked after him until his death.

Britten's last works include the Suite on English Folk Tunes "A Time There Was" (1974); the Third String Quartet (1975), which drew on material from Death in Venice; and the dramatic cantata Phaedra (1975), written for Janet Baker.

In June 1976, the last year of his life, Britten accepted a life peerage – the first composer so honoured – becoming Baron Britten, of Aldeburgh in the County of Suffolk. (Note: Some writers have supposed that Britten was earlier offered and had declined a knighthood, but his name is not included in the official list issued in 2012 by the Cabinet Office naming everyone (except those still living at the time of publication) who had declined an honour between 1950 and 1999.) After the 1976 Aldeburgh Festival, Britten and Pears travelled to Norway, where Britten began writing Praise We Great Men, for voices and orchestra based on a poem by Edith Sitwell. He returned to Aldeburgh in August, and wrote Welcome Ode for children's choir and orchestra. In November, Britten realised that he could no longer compose. On his 63rd birthday, 22 November, at his request Rita Thomson organised a champagne party and invited his friends and his sisters Barbara and Beth, to say their goodbyes to the dying composer. When Rostropovich made his farewell visit a few days later, Britten gave him what he had written of Praise We Great Men.

I heard of his death ... and took a long walk in total silence through gently falling snow across a frozen lake, which corresponded exactly to the inexpressible sense of numbness at such a loss. The world is colder and lonelier without the presence of our supreme creator of music.

— Peter Maxwell Davies, 1977.

Britten died of congestive heart failure on 4 December 1976. His funeral service was held at Aldeburgh Parish Church three days later, and he was buried in its churchyard, with a gravestone carved by Reynolds Stone. The authorities at Westminster Abbey had offered burial there, but Britten had made it clear that he wished his grave to be side by side with that, in due course, of Pears. A memorial service was held at the Abbey on 10 March 1977, at which the congregation was headed by Queen Elizabeth The Queen Mother.

== Personal life and character ==
Despite his large number of works on Christian themes, Britten has sometimes been thought of as an agnostic. Pears said that when they met in 1937 he was not sure whether or not Britten would have described himself as a Christian. In the 1960s Britten called himself a dedicated Christian, though sympathetic to the radical views propounded by the Bishop of Woolwich in Honest to God. Politically, Britten was on the left. He told Pears that he always voted either Liberal or Labour and could not imagine ever voting Conservative, but he was never a member of any party, except the Peace Pledge Union.

Physically, Britten was never robust. He walked and swam regularly and kept himself as fit as he could, but in his 1992 biography, Carpenter mentions 20 illnesses, a few of them minor but most fairly serious, suffered over the years by Britten before his final heart complaint developed. Emotionally, according to some commentators, Britten never completely grew up, retaining in his outlook something of a child's view of the world. He was not always confident that he was the genius others declared him to be, and though he was hypercritical of his own works, he was acutely, even aggressively sensitive to criticism from anybody else.

Britten was, as he himself acknowledged, notorious for dumping friends and colleagues who either offended him or ceased to be of use to him – his "corpses". The conductor Sir Charles Mackerras believed that the term was invented by Lord Harewood. Both Mackerras and Harewood joined the list of corpses, the former for joking that the number of boys in Noye's Fludde must have been a delight to the composer, and the latter for an extramarital affair and subsequent divorce from Lady Harewood, which shocked the puritanical Britten. Among other corpses were his librettists Montagu Slater and Eric Crozier. The latter said in 1949, "He has sometimes told me, jokingly, that one day I would join the ranks of his 'corpses' and I have always recognized that any ordinary person must soon outlive his usefulness to such a great creative artist as Ben." Dame Janet Baker said in 1981, "I think he was quite entitled to take what he wanted from others ... He did not want to hurt anyone, but the task in hand was more important than anything or anybody." Matthews feels that this aspect of Britten has been exaggerated, and he observes that the composer sustained many deep friendships to the end of his life.

=== Controversies ===
==== Boys ====
Throughout his adult life, Britten had a particular rapport with children and enjoyed close friendships with several boys, particularly those in their early teens. (Note: The filmmaker John Bridcut sees significance in evidence that Britten mentally regarded himself as perpetually 13 years old. Bridcut views this as manifest both in the Letts diaries Britten bought and used well into his adult life, in which he wrote several statistics relevant to himself when that age, and in his remark to Imogen Holst, "I'm still thirteen.") The first such friendship was with Piers Dunkerley, who was 13 years old in 1934, when Britten was aged 20. Other boys Britten befriended were the young David Hemmings and Michael Crawford, both of whom sang treble roles in his works in the 1950s. Hemmings later said, "In all of the time that I spent with him he never abused that trust", and Crawford wrote "I cannot say enough about the kindness of that great man ... he had a wonderful patience and affinity with young people. He loved music, and loved youngsters caring about music." (Note: In the early 1940s, while living in North America, Britten shared a room with 13 year old Bobby Rothman when staying with the Rothman family: "many an evening we used to spend ... a lot of time just really talking he in the bed next to me ... His fondness for me was something that was beyond my normal social connections, and I was a little overwhelmed that someone should be so fond of me ... I can still remember us talking late at night one time, and finding when it was really time to call it quits and go to sleep ... he said, 'Bobby, would you mind terribly if, before we fell asleep, I came over and gave you a hug and a kiss?' It was just one of those touching moments ... And I've got to say I really did not know what to do except say, 'no, no I don't mind', and he gently got up and gave me a gentle hug and kiss and said goodnight.")

It was long suspected by several of Britten's close associates that there was something exceptional about his attraction to teenage boys: Auden referred to Britten's "attraction to thin-as-a-board juveniles ... to the sexless and innocent", and Pears once wrote to Britten: "remember there are lovely things in the world still – children, boys, sunshine, the sea, Mozart, you and me." In public, the matter was little discussed during Britten's lifetime and much discussed after it. (Note: The journalist Martin Kettle wrote in 2012 that although there is no evidence of wrongful conduct, it is important that allegations of paedophilia should be openly discussed, both to avoid covering up criminal behaviour and to avoid oversimplifying the complexity of Britten's sexuality and creativity.) Carpenter's 1992 biography closely examined the evidence, as do later studies of Britten, most particularly John Bridcut's Britten's Children (2006), which concentrates on Britten's friendships and relationships with various children and adolescents. Some commentators have continued to question Britten's conduct, sometimes very sharply. Carpenter and Bridcut conclude that he held any sexual impulses under firm control and kept the relationships affectionate – including bed-sharing, kissing and nude bathing – but strictly platonic.

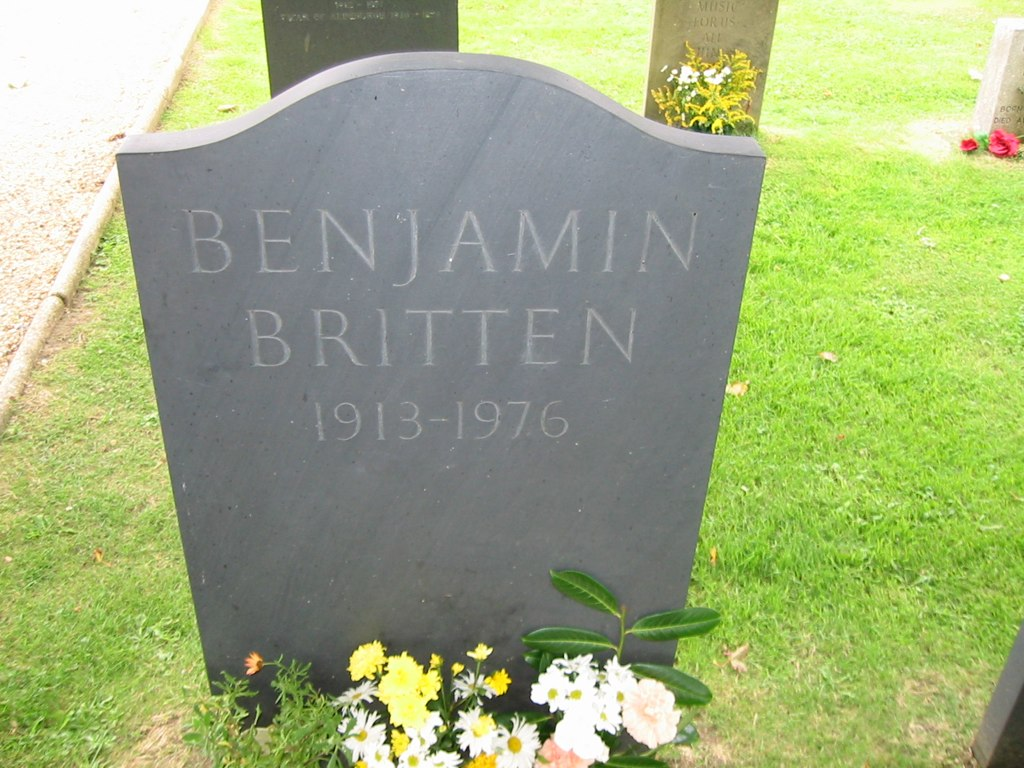
Britten's grave at St Peter and St Paul's Church, Aldeburgh, Suffolk

==== Cause of death ====
A more recent controversy was the statement in a 2013 biography of Britten by Paul Kildea that the composer's heart failure was due to undetected syphilis, which Kildea speculates was a result of Pears's promiscuity while the two were living in New York. In response, Britten's consultant cardiologist said that, like all the hospital's similar cases, Britten was routinely screened for syphilis before the operation, with negative results. He described as "complete rubbish" Kildea's allegation that the surgeon who operated on Britten in 1973 would or even could have covered up a syphilitic condition. Kildea continued to maintain, "When all the composer's symptoms are considered there can be only one cause." In The Times, Richard Morrison praised the rest of Kildea's book, and hoped that its reputation would not be "tarnished by one sensational speculation ... some second-hand hearsay ... presenting unsubstantiated gossip as fact."

== Music ==
=== Influences ===
Britten's early musical life was dominated by the classical masters; his mother's ambition was for him to become the "Fourth B" – after Bach, Beethoven and Brahms. Britten was later to assert that his initial development as a composer was stifled by reverence for these masters: "Between the ages of thirteen and sixteen I knew every note of Beethoven and Brahms. I remember receiving the full score of Fidelio for my fourteenth birthday ... But I think in a sense I never forgave them for having led me astray in my own particular thinking and natural inclinations." He developed a particular animosity towards Brahms, whose piano music he had once held in great esteem; in 1952 he confided that he played through all Brahms's music from time to time, "to see if I am right about him; I usually find that I underestimated last time how bad it was!"

Through his association with Frank Bridge, Britten's musical horizons expanded. He discovered the music of Debussy and Ravel which, Matthews writes, "gave him a model for an orchestral sound". Bridge also led Britten to the music of Schoenberg and Berg; the latter's death in 1935 affected Britten deeply. A letter at that time reveals his thoughts on the contemporary music scene: "The real musicians are so few & far between, aren't they? Apart from the Bergs, Stravinskys, Schoenbergs & Bridges one is a bit stumped for names, isn't one?" – adding, as an afterthought: "Shostakovitch – perhaps – possibly". By this time Britten had developed a lasting hostility towards the English Pastoral School represented by Vaughan Williams and Ireland, whose work he compared unfavourably with the "brilliant folk-song arrangements of Percy Grainger"; Grainger became the inspiration of many of Britten's later folk arrangements. Britten was also impressed by Delius, and thought Brigg Fair "delicious" when he heard it in 1931. Also in that year he heard Stravinsky's The Rite of Spring, which he found "bewildering and terrifying", yet at the same time "incredibly marvellous and arresting". The same composer's Symphony of Psalms, and Petrushka were lauded in similar terms. He and Stravinsky later developed a mutual antipathy informed by jealousy and mistrust.

Besides his growing attachments to the works of 20th century masters, Britten – along with his contemporary Michael Tippett – was devoted to the English music of the late 17th and early 18th centuries, in particular the work of Purcell. In defining his mission as a composer of opera, Britten wrote: "One of my chief aims is to try to restore to the musical setting of the English Language a brilliance, freedom and vitality that have been curiously rare since the death of Purcell." Among the closest of Britten's kindred composer spirits – even more so than Purcell – was Mahler, whose Fourth Symphony Britten heard in September 1930. At that time Mahler's music was little regarded and rarely played in English concert halls. Britten later wrote of how the scoring of this work impressed him: "... entirely clean and transparent ... the material was remarkable, and the melodic shapes highly original, with such rhythmic and harmonic tension from beginning to end." He soon discovered other Mahler works, in particular Das Lied von der Erde; he wrote to a friend about the concluding "Abschied" of Das Lied: "It is cruel, you know, that music should be so beautiful." (Note: In 1938, Britten attended what was only the second British performance of Mahler's Eighth Symphony, the "Symphony of a Thousand", with Sir Henry Wood and the BBC Symphony Orchestra. Britten declared himself "tremendously impressed" by the music, though he thought the performance "execrable".) Apart from Mahler's general influence on Britten's compositional style, the incorporation by Britten of popular tunes (as, for example, in Death in Venice) is a direct inheritance from the older composer.

=== Operas ===
The Britten-Pears Foundation considers the composer's operas "perhaps the most substantial and important part of his compositional legacy." Britten's operas are firmly established in the international repertoire: according to Operabase, they are performed worldwide more than those of any other composer born in the 20th century, and only Puccini and Richard Strauss come ahead of him if the list is extended to all operas composed after 1900.

The early operetta Paul Bunyan stands apart from Britten's later operatic works. Philip Brett calls it "a patronizing attempt to evoke the spirit of a nation not his own by W. H. Auden in which Britten was a somewhat dazzled accomplice." The American public liked it, but the critics did not, (Note: The critics' outrage at the presumption of Auden and Britten in writing an American work mirrored the hostile response of London critics six years earlier when Jerome Kern and Oscar Hammerstein presented Three Sisters, a musical set in England.) and it fell into neglect until interest revived near the end of the composer's life.

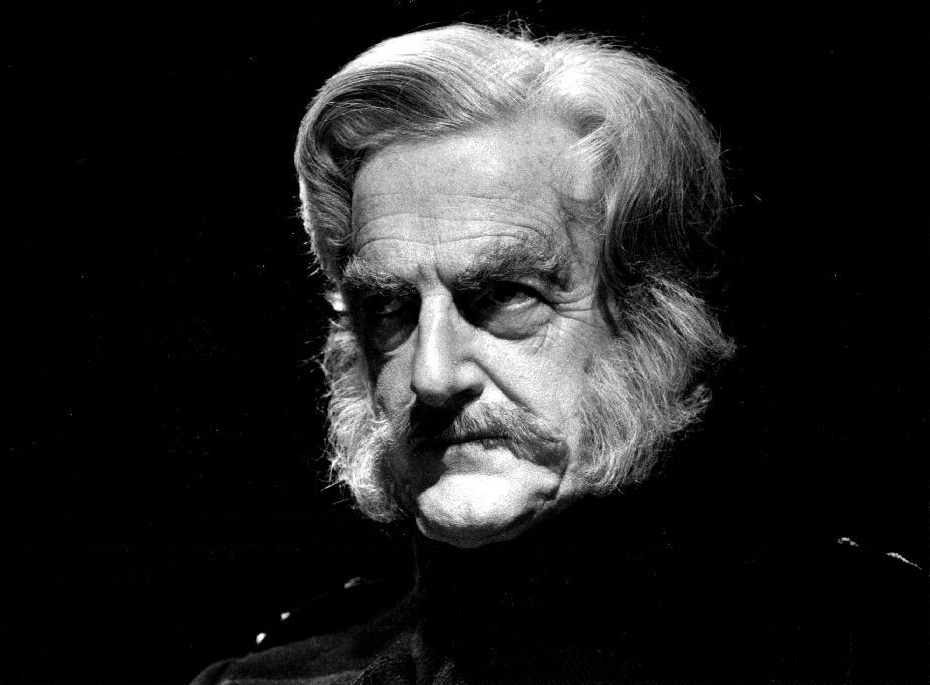
Peter Pears as the General in Owen Wingrave, 1971

Britten's subsequent operas range from large-scale works written for full-strength opera companies, to chamber operas for performance by small touring opera ensembles or in churches and schools. In the large-scale category are Peter Grimes (1945), Billy Budd (1951), Gloriana (1953), A Midsummer Night's Dream (1960) and Death in Venice (1973). Of the remaining operas, The Rape of Lucretia (1946), Albert Herring (1947), The Little Sweep (1949) and The Turn of the Screw (1954) were written for small opera companies. Noye's Fludde (1958), Curlew River (1964), The Burning Fiery Furnace (1966) and The Prodigal Son (1968) were for church performance, and had their premieres at St Bartholomew's Church, Orford. The secular The Golden Vanity was intended to be performed in schools. Owen Wingrave, written for television, was first presented live by the Royal Opera at Covent Garden in 1973, two years after its broadcast premiere.

Music critics have frequently commented on the recurring theme in Britten's operas from Peter Grimes onward of the isolated individual at odds with a hostile society. The extent to which this reflected Britten's perception of himself, pacifist and homosexual, in the England of the 1930s, 40s and 50s is debated. Another recurrent theme is the corruption of innocence, most sharply seen in The Turn of the Screw.

Over the 28 years between Peter Grimes and Death in Venice Britten's musical style changed, as he introduced elements of atonalism – though remaining essentially a tonal composer – and of eastern music, particularly gamelan sounds but also eastern harmonies. In A Midsummer Night's Dream the orchestral scoring varies to fit the nature of each set of characters: "the bright, percussive sounds of harps, keyboards and percussion for the fairy world, warm strings and wind for the pairs of lovers, and lower woodwind and brass for the mechanicals." In Death in Venice Britten turns Tadzio and his family into silent dancers, "accompanied by the colourful, glittering sounds of tuned percussion to emphasize their remoteness."

As early as 1948 the music analyst Hans Keller, summarising Britten's impact on 20th-century opera to that date, compared his contribution to that of Mozart in the 18th century: "Mozart may in some respects be regarded as a founder (a 'second founder') of opera. The same can already be said today, as far as the modern British – perhaps not only British – field goes, of Britten." In addition to his own original operas, Britten, together with Imogen Holst, extensively revised Purcell's Dido and Aeneas (1951) and The Fairy-Queen (1967). Britten's Purcell realizations brought Purcell, who was then neglected, to a wider public, but have themselves been neglected since the dominance of the trend to authentic performance practice. His 1948 revision of The Beggar's Opera amounts to a wholesale recomposition, retaining the original melodies but giving them new, highly sophisticated orchestral accompaniments.

=== Song cycles ===
Throughout his career Britten was drawn to the song cycle form. In 1928, when he was 14, he composed an orchestral cycle, Quatre chansons françaises, setting words by Victor Hugo and Paul Verlaine. Brett comments that though the work is much influenced by Wagner on the one hand and French mannerisms on the other, "the diatonic nursery-like tune for the sad boy with the consumptive mother in 'L'enfance' is entirely characteristic." After he came under Auden's influence Britten composed Our Hunting Fathers (1936), ostensibly a protest against fox-hunting but which also alludes allegorically to the contemporary political state of Europe. The work has never been popular; in 1948 the critic Colin Mason lamented its neglect and called it one of Britten's greatest works. In Mason's view the cycle is "as exciting as Les Illuminations, and offers many interesting and enjoyable foretastes of the best moments of his later works."

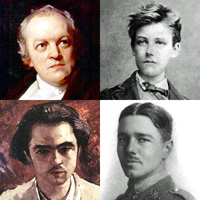
Poets whose words Britten set included (clockwise from top l) Blake, Rimbaud, Owen and Verlaine

The first of Britten's song cycles to gain widespread popularity was Les Illuminations (1940), for high voice (originally soprano, later more often sung by tenors) (Note: Matthews comments that the work is "so much more sensuous when sung by the soprano voice for which the songs were conceived.") with string orchestra accompaniment, setting words by Arthur Rimbaud. Britten's music reflects the eroticism in Rimbaud's poems; Copland commented of the section "Antique" that he did not know how Britten dared to write the melody. "Antique" was dedicated to "K.H.W.S.", or Wulff Scherchen, Britten's first romantic interest. Matthews judges the piece the crowning masterpiece of Britten's early years. By the time of Britten's next cycle, Seven Sonnets of Michelangelo (1942) for tenor and piano, Pears had become his partner and muse; in Matthews's phrase, Britten wrote the cycle as "his declaration of love for Peter". It too finds the sensuality of the verses it sets, though in its structure it resembles a conventional 19th-century song cycle. Mason draws a distinction between this and Britten's earlier cycles, because here each song is self-contained, and has no thematic connection with any of the others.

The Serenade for Tenor, Horn and Strings (1943) sets verses by a variety of poets, all on the theme of night-time. Though Britten described the cycle as "not important stuff, but quite pleasant, I think", it was immediately greeted as a masterpiece, and together with Peter Grimes it established him as one of the leading composers of his day. Mason calls it "a beautifully unified work on utterly dissimilar poems, held together by the most superficial but most effective, and therefore most suitable symphonic method. Some of the music is pure word-painting, some of it mood-painting, of the subtlest kind." Two years later, after witnessing the horrors of Belsen, Britten composed The Holy Sonnets of John Donne. Britten's technique in this cycle ranges from atonality in the first song to firm tonality later, with a resolute B major chord at the climax of "Death, be not proud".

Nocturne (1958) is the last of the orchestral cycles. As in the Serenade, Britten set words by a range of poets, who here include Shakespeare, Coleridge, Keats, Shelley, Tennyson and Wilfred Owen. The whole cycle is darker in tone than the Serenade, with pre-echoes of the War Requiem. All the songs have subtly different orchestrations, with a prominent obbligato part for a different instrument in each. Among Britten's later song cycles with piano accompaniment is the Songs and Proverbs of William Blake, composed for the baritone Dietrich Fischer-Dieskau. This presents all its poems in a continuous stream of music; Brett writes that it "interleaves a ritornello-like setting of the seven proverbs with seven songs that paint an increasingly sombre picture of human existence." A Pushkin cycle, The Poet's Echo (1965), was written for Galina Vishnevskaya, and shows a more robust and extrovert side of the composer. Though written ostensibly in the tradition of European song cycles, it draws atmospherically on the polyphony of south-east Asian music. Who Are These Children? (1969), setting 12 verses by William Soutar, is among the grimmest of Britten's cycles. After he could no longer play the piano, Britten composed a cycle of Robert Burns settings, A Birthday Hansel (1976), for voice and harp.

=== Other vocal works ===
Nicholas Maw said of Britten's vocal music: "His feeling for poetry (not only English) and the inflexions of language make him, I think, the greatest musical realizer of English." One of the best-known works in which Britten set poetry was the War Requiem (1962). It intersperses the Latin requiem mass, sung by soprano and chorus, with settings of works by the First World War poet Wilfred Owen, sung by tenor and baritone. At the end the two elements are combined, as the last line of Owen's "Strange meeting" mingles with the In paradisum of the mass. Matthews describes the conclusion of the work as "a great wave of benediction [which] recalls the end of the Sinfonia da Requiem, and its similar ebbing away into the sea that symbolises both reconciliation and death." The same year, he composed A Hymn of St Columba for choir and organ, setting a poem by the 6th-century saint. Other works for voices and orchestra include the Missa Brevis and the Cantata academica (both 1959) on religious themes, Children's Crusade to a text by Bertolt Brecht about a group of children in wartime Poland, to be performed by children (1969), and the late cantata Phaedra (1975), a story of fated love and death modelled on Handel's Italian cantatas.

Smaller-scale works for accompanied voice include the five Canticles, composed between 1947 and 1974. They are written for a variety of voices (tenor in all five; counter-tenor or alto in II and IV and baritone in IV) and accompaniments (piano in I to IV, horn in III and harp in V). The first, Canticle I: My beloved is mine and I am his, is a setting of Francis Quarles's 17th-century poem "A Divine Rapture", and according to Britten was modelled on Purcell's Divine Hymns. Matthews describes it as one of the composer's most serene works, which "ends in a mood of untroubled happiness that would soon become rare in Britten's music." The second Canticle was written in 1952, between Billy Budd and Gloriana, on the theme of Abraham's obedience to Divine Authority in the proffered sacrifice of his son Isaac. (Note: The piece was much admired by Tippett as "one of the wonderful things in Britten's music", an opinion with which Britten apparently concurred.) "Canticle III" from 1954 is a setting of Edith Sitwell's wartime poem "Still Falls the Rain", composed just after The Turn of the Screw with which it is structurally and stylistically associated. The twelve-note cycle in the first five bars of the piano part of the Canticle introduced a feature that became thereafter a regular part of Britten's compositional technique. Canticle IV: The Journey of the Magi, premiered in 1971, is based on T. S. Eliot's poem "Journey of the Magi". It is musically close to The Burning Fiery Furnace of 1966; Matthews refers to it as a "companion piece" to the earlier work. The final Canticle V: The Death of Saint Narcissus was another Eliot setting, his juvenile poem "Death of Saint Narcissus". Although Britten had little idea of what the poem was about, the musicologist Arnold Whittall finds the text "almost frighteningly apt ... for a composer conscious of his own sickness." Matthews sees Narcissus as "another figure from [Britten's] magic world of dreams and ideal beauty."

=== Orchestral works ===
External audio
- Benjamin Britten's The Young Person's Guide to the Orchestra, Op. 34, Britten conducting the London Symphony Orchestra in 1967 – via Internet Archive

The Britten scholar Donald Mitchell has written, "It is easy, because of the scope, stature, and sheer volume of the operas, and the wealth of vocal music of all kinds, to pay insufficient attention to the many works Britten wrote in other, specifically non-vocal genres." Maw said of Britten, "He is one of the 20th century's great orchestral composers ... His orchestration has an individuality, incisiveness and integration with the musical material only achieved by the greatest composers." Among Britten's best-known orchestral works are the Variations on a Theme of Frank Bridge (1937), the Sinfonia da Requiem (1940), the Four Sea Interludes (1945) and The Young Person's Guide to the Orchestra (1945). The Variations, an affectionate tribute to Britten's teacher, range from comic parodies of Italian operatic clichés and Viennese waltzes to a strutting march, reflecting the rise of militarism in Europe, and a Mahlerian funeral march; the piece ends with an exuberant fugal finale. The Sinfonia moves from an opening Lacrymosa filled with fear and lamentation to a fierce Dies irae and then to a final Requiem aeternam, described by the critic Herbert Glass as "the most uneasy 'eternal rest' possible". Mason considers the Sinfonia a failure: "less entertaining than usual, because its object is not principally to entertain but to express symphonically. It fails because it is neither picturesquely nor formally symphonic." The Sea Interludes, adapted by Britten from the full score of Peter Grimes, make a concert suite depicting the sea and the Borough in which the opera is set; the character of the music is strongly contrasted between "Dawn", "Sunday Morning", "Moonlight" and "Storm". The commentator Howard Posner observes that there is not a bar in the interludes, no matter how beautiful, that is free of foreboding. The Young Person's Guide, based on a theme by Purcell, showcases the orchestra's individual sections and groups, and gained widespread popularity from the outset. Christopher Headington calls the work "exuberant and uncomplicated music, scored with clarity and vigour [that] fits well into Britten's oeuvre." David Matthews calls it "a brilliant educational exercise." (Note: The piece is formally sub-titled "Variations and Fugue on a Theme of Henry Purcell"; Britten greatly disliked the BBC's practice of referring to the work by the grander sub-title in preference to his preferred title.)

Unlike his English predecessors such as Elgar and Vaughan Williams, and composers from mainland Europe whom he admired, including Mahler and Shostakovich, Britten was not a classical symphonist. His youthful jeux d'esprit the Simple Symphony (1934) is in conventional symphonic structure, observing sonata form and the traditional four-movement pattern, but of his mature works his Spring Symphony (1949) is more a song cycle than a true symphony, and the concertante Cello Symphony (1963) is an attempt to balance the traditional concerto and symphony. During its four movements the Cello Symphony moves from a deeply pessimistic opening to a finale of radiant happiness rare for Britten by this point. The composer considered it "the finest thing I've written."

The Piano Concerto (1938) was at first criticised for being too light-hearted and virtuoso. In 1945 Britten revised it, replacing a skittish third movement with a more sombre passacaglia that, in Matthews's view, gives the work more depth, and makes the apparent triumph of the finale more ambivalent. The Violin Concerto (1939), finished in the first weeks of the World War, has virtuoso elements, but they are balanced by lyrical and elegiac passages, "undoubtedly reflecting Britten's growing concern with the escalation of world hostilities." Neither concerto is among Britten's most popular works, but in the 21st century the Violin Concerto, which is technically difficult, has been performed more frequently than before, both in the concert hall and on record, and has enthusiastic performers and advocates, notably violinist Janine Jansen.

Britten's incidental music for theatre, film and radio, much of it unpublished, was the subject of an essay by William Mann, published in 1952 in the first detailed critical assessment of Britten's music to that date. Of these pieces the music for a radio play, The Rescue, by Edward Sackville-West, is praised by the musicologist Lewis Foreman as "of such stature and individual character as to be worth a regular place alongside [Britten's] other dramatic scores." Mann finds in this score pre-echoes of the second act of Billy Budd, while Foreman observes that Britten "appears to have made passing allusions to The Rescue in his final opera, Death in Venice.

=== Chamber and instrumental works ===
Britten's close friendship with Rostropovich inspired the Cello Sonata (1961) and three suites for solo cello (1964–71). String quartets featured throughout Britten's composing career, from a student work in 1928 to his Third String Quartet (1975). The Second Quartet, from 1945, was written in homage to Purcell; Mason considered it Britten's most important instrumental work to that date. Referring to this work, Keller writes of the ease with which Britten, relatively early in his compositional career, solves "the modern sonata problem – the achievement of symmetry and unity within an extended ternary circle based on more than one subject." Keller likens the innovatory skill of the Quartet to that of Walton's Viola Concerto. The third Quartet was Britten's last major work; the critic Colin Anderson said of it in 2007, "one of Britten's greatest achievements, one with interesting allusions to Bartók and Shostakovich, and written with an economy that opens out a depth of emotion that can be quite chilling. The Gemini Variations (1965), for flute, violin and piano duet, were based on a theme of Zoltán Kodály and written as a virtuoso piece for the 13-year-old Jeney twins, musical prodigies whom Britten had met in Budapest in the previous year. For Osian Ellis, Britten wrote the Suite for Harp (1969), which Joan Chissell in The Times described as "a little masterpiece of concentrated fancy". Nocturnal after John Dowland (1963) for solo guitar was written for Julian Bream and has been praised by Benjamin Dwyer for its "semantic complexity, prolonged musical argument, and philosophical depth".

=== Legacy ===
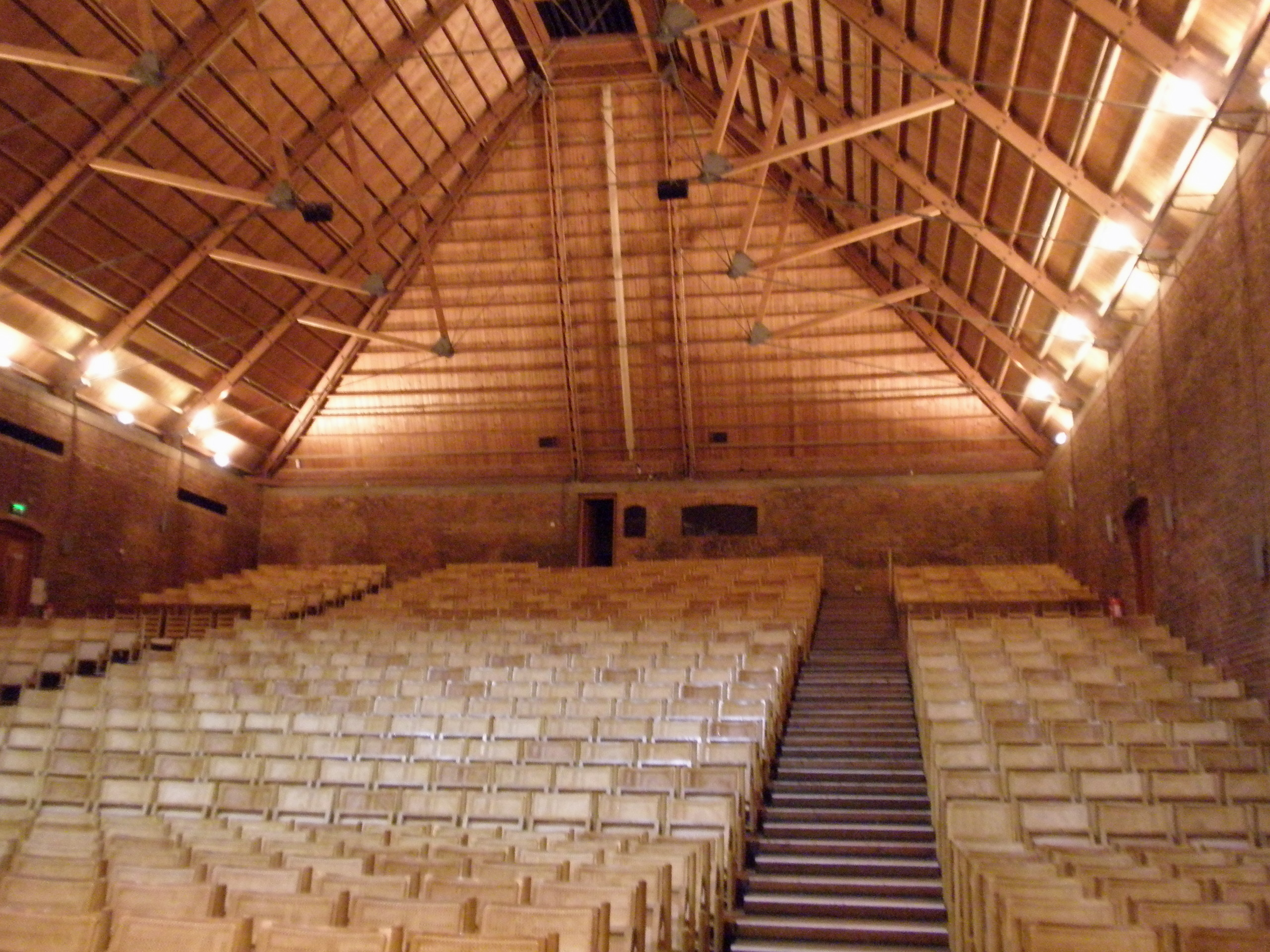
Snape Maltings concert hall, a main venue of the Aldeburgh Festival, founded by Britten, Pears and Crozier

Britten's fellow composers had divided views about him. To Tippett he was "simply the most musical person I have ever met", with an "incredible" technical mastery; some contemporaries, however, were less effusive. In Tippett's view, Walton and others were convinced that Britten and Pears were leaders of a homosexual conspiracy in music, (Note: Steuart Wilson, a retired singer who held a succession of posts as a musical administrator, launched an outspoken campaign in 1955 against "homosexuality in British music" and was quoted as saying: "The influence of perverts in the world of music has grown beyond all measure. If it is not curbed soon, Covent Garden and other precious musical heritages could suffer irreparable harm.") a belief Tippett dismisses as ridiculous, inspired by jealousy of Britten's postwar successes. Leonard Bernstein considered Britten "a man at odds with the world", and said of his music: "[I]f you hear it, not just listen to it superficially, you become aware of something very dark." The tenor Robert Tear, who was closely associated with Britten in the latter part of the composer's career, made a similar point: "There was a great, huge abyss in his soul ... He got into the valley of the shadow of death and couldn't get out."

In the decade after Britten's death, his standing as a composer in Britain was to some extent overshadowed by that of the still-living Tippett. The film-maker Tony Palmer thought that Tippett's temporary ascendancy might have been a question of the two composers' contrasting personalities: Tippett had more warmth and had made fewer enemies. In any event this was a short-lived phenomenon; Tippett adherents such as the composer Robert Saxton soon rediscovered their enthusiasm for Britten, whose audience steadily increased during the final years of the 20th century. Britten has had few imitators; Brett describes him as "inimitable, possessed of ... a voice and sound too dangerous to imitate." Nevertheless, after his death Britten was lauded by the younger generation of English composers to whom, in the words of Oliver Knussen, he became "a phenomenal father-figure". Brett believes that he affected every subsequent British composer to some extent: "He is a key figure in the growth of British musical culture in the second half of the 20th century, and his effect on everything from opera to the revitalization of music education is hard to overestimate."

Whittall believes that one reason for Britten's enduring popularity is the "progressive conservatism" of his music. He generally avoided the avant-garde, and did not challenge the conventions in the way that contemporaries such as Tippett did. Perhaps, says Brett, "the tide that swept away serialism, atonality and most forms of musical modernism and brought in neo-Romanticism, minimalism and other modes of expression involved with tonality carried with it renewed interest in composers who had been out of step with the times." Britten defined his mission as a composer in very simple terms: composers should aim at "pleasing people today as seriously as we can".

== Pianist and conductor ==
Britten, though a reluctant conductor and a nervous pianist, was greatly sought after in both capacities. The piano accompanist Gerald Moore wrote in his memoirs about playing at all the main music festivals except for Aldeburgh, because "as the presiding genius there is the greatest accompanist in the world, my services are not needed." (Note: In 2006 Gramophone magazine invited eminent present-day accompanists to name their "professional's professional": the joint winners were Britten and Moore.) Britten's recital partnership with Pears was his best-known collaboration, but he also accompanied Kathleen Ferrier, Rostropovich, Dietrich Fischer-Dieskau, James Bowman and John Shirley-Quirk, among others. Though usually too nervous to play piano solos, Britten often performed piano duets with Clifford Curzon or Richter, and chamber music with the Amadeus Quartet. The composers whose works, other than his own, he most often played were Mozart and Schubert; the latter, in Murray Perahia's view, was Britten's greatest idol. As a boy and young man, Britten had intensely admired Brahms, but his admiration waned to nothing, and Brahms seldom featured in his repertory. (Note: Britten once said, "It's not bad Brahms I mind, it's good Brahms I can't stand.")

Singers and players admired Britten's conducting, and David Webster rated it highly enough to offer him the musical directorship of the Covent Garden Opera in 1952. (Note: So writes John Bridcut, but Webster's biographer, Montague Haltrecht, recounts that no formal offer of the post was made to Britten. According to Haltrecht, Lord Harewood and other Covent Garden board members wanted Britten for the post, but Webster believed that it was above all as a composer that Britten could bring glory to Covent Garden.) Britten declined; he was not confident of his ability as a conductor and was reluctant to spend too much time performing rather than composing. As a conductor, Britten's repertory included Purcell, Bach, Haydn, Mozart and Schubert, and occasional less characteristic choices including Schumann's Scenes from Goethe's Faust; Elgar's The Dream of Gerontius and Introduction and Allegro; Holst's Egdon Heath and short pieces by Percy Grainger.

== Recordings ==
Britten, like Elgar and Walton before him, was signed up by a major British recording company, (Note: Elgar was an exclusive His Master's Voice artist; Walton, after a brief spell with Decca, made most of his recordings for Columbia.) and performed a considerable proportion of his output on disc. For the Decca Record Company he made some monaural records in the 1940s and 1950s, followed, with the enthusiastic support of the Decca producer John Culshaw, by numerous stereophonic versions of his works. Culshaw wrote, "The happiest hours I have spent in any studio were with Ben, for the basic reason that it did not seem that we were trying to make records or video tapes; we were just trying to make music." (Note: Imogen Holst remembered Britten's recording sessions differently: "He used to find recording sessions more exhausting than anything else, and dreaded the days when he had to stop writing a new opera in order to record the one before last.")

In May 1943 Britten made his debut in the Decca studios, accompanying Sophie Wyss in five of his arrangements of French folk songs. The following January he and Pears recorded together, in Britten's arrangements of British folk songs, and the following day, in duet with Curzon he recorded his Introduction and Rondo alla burlesca and Mazurka elegiaca. In May 1944 he conducted the Boyd Neel string orchestra, Dennis Brain and Pears in the first recording of the Serenade for Tenor, Horn and Strings, which has frequently been reissued, most recently on CD.

Britten's first operatic recording was The Turn of the Screw, made in January 1955 with the original English Opera Group forces. In 1957 he conducted The Prince of the Pagodas in an early stereo recording, supervised by Culshaw. Decca's first major commercial success with Britten came the following year, with Peter Grimes, which has, at 2013, never been out of the catalogues since its first release. From 1958 Britten conducted Decca recordings of many of his operas and vocal and orchestral works, including the Nocturne (1959), the Spring Symphony (1960) and the War Requiem (1963). The last sold in unexpectedly large numbers for a classical set, and thereafter Decca unstintingly made resources available to Culshaw and his successors for Britten recordings. The album eventually reached No. 68 on the US charts. Sets followed of Albert Herring (1964), the Sinfonia da Requiem (1964), Curlew River (1965), A Midsummer Night's Dream (1966), The Burning Fiery Furnace (1967), Billy Budd (1967) and many of the other major works. In 2013, to mark the anniversary of Britten's birth, Decca released a set of 65 CDs and one DVD, Benjamin Britten – Complete Works. (Note: The set comprises all the composer's works with opus numbers and all works commercially recorded by 2013 (many fragments and juvenilia have not been published or recorded). The set includes Britten's folksong arrangements, but excludes his Purcell realisations.) Most of the recordings were from Decca's back catalogue, but in the interests of comprehensiveness a substantial number of tracks were licensed from 20 other companies including EMI, Virgin Classics, Naxos, Warner and NMC.

As a pianist and conductor in other composers' music, Britten made many recordings for Decca. Among his studio collaborations with Pears are sets of Schubert's Winterreise and Die schöne Müllerin, Schumann's Dichterliebe, and songs by Haydn, Mozart, Bridge, Ireland, Holst, Tippett and Richard Rodney Bennett. Other soloists whom Britten accompanied on record were Ferrier, Rostropovich and Vishnevskaya. As a conductor he recorded a wide range of composers, from Purcell to Grainger. Among his best-known Decca recordings are Purcell's The Fairy-Queen, Bach's Brandenburg Concertos, Cantata 151, Cantata 102 and St John Passion, Elgar's The Dream of Gerontius and Mozart's last two symphonies.

== Honours, awards and commemorations ==
Blue plaque at 173 Cromwell Road in London

State honours awarded to Britten included appointment as a Member of the Order of the Companions of Honour (United Kingdom) in 1953; Commander of the Royal Order of the Polar Star (Sweden) in 1962; the Order of Merit (United Kingdom) in 1965; and a life peerage (United Kingdom) in July 1976, he took the title Baron Britten, of Aldeburgh in the County of Suffolk. He received honorary degrees and fellowships from 19 conservatories and universities in Europe and America. His awards included the Hanseatic Goethe Prize (1961); the Aspen Award, Colorado (1964); the Royal Philharmonic Society's Gold Medal (1964); the Wihuri Sibelius Prize (1965); the Mahler Medal (Bruckner and Mahler Society of America, 1967); the Léonie Sonning Music Prize (Denmark, 1968); the Ernst von Siemens Music Prize (1974); and the Ravel Prize (1974). Prizes for individual works included UNESCO's International Rostrum of Composers 1961 for A Midsummer Night's Dream; and Grammy Awards in 1963 and 1977 for the War Requiem.

The Red House, Aldeburgh, where Britten and Pears lived and worked together from 1957 until Britten's death in 1976, is now the home of the Britten-Pears Foundation, established to promote their musical legacy. In Britten's centenary year his studio at the Red House was restored to the way it was in the 1950s and opened to the public. The converted hayloft was designed and built by H T Cadbury Brown in 1958 and was described by Britten as a "magnificent work". In June 2013 Dame Janet Baker officially opened the Britten-Pears archive in a new building in the grounds of the Red House. The Benjamin Britten Music Academy in Lowestoft, founded in the composer's honour, was completed in 1979; it is an 11–18 co-educational day school, with ties to the Britten-Pears Foundation.

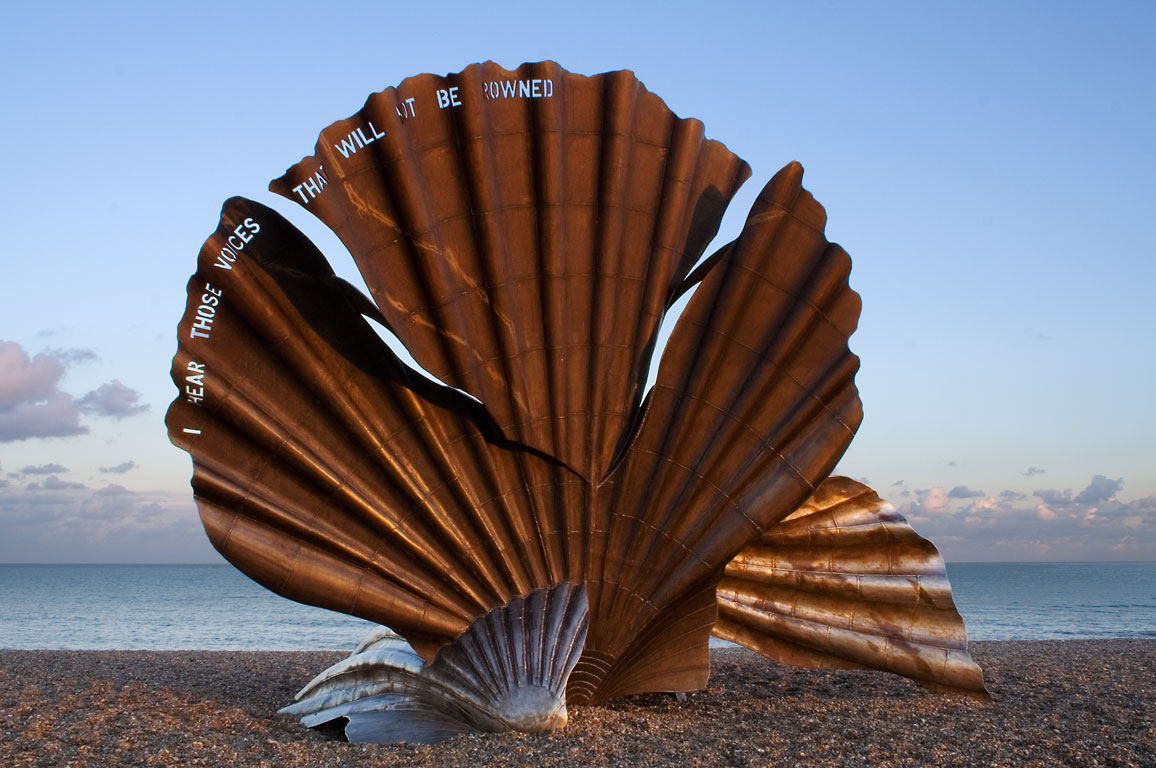
Scallop by Maggi Hambling is a sculpture dedicated to Benjamin Britten on the beach at Aldeburgh. The edge of the shell is pierced with the words "I hear those voices that will not be drowned" from Peter Grimes.

A memorial stone to Britten was unveiled in the north choir aisle of Westminster Abbey in 1978. There are memorial plaques to him at three of his London homes: 173 Cromwell Road, 45a St John's Wood High Street, and 8 Halliford Street in Islington. In April 2013 Britten was honoured by the Royal Mail in the UK, as one of ten people selected as subjects for the "Great Britons" commemorative postage stamp issue.

Other creative artists have celebrated Britten. In 1970 Walton composed Improvisations on an Impromptu of Benjamin Britten, based on a theme from Britten's Piano Concerto. Works commemorating Britten include Cantus in Memoriam Benjamin Britten an orchestral piece written in 1977 by Arvo Pärt, and Sally Beamish's Variations on a Theme of Benjamin Britten, based on the second Sea Interlude from Peter Grimes; she composed the work to mark Britten's centenary. Alan Bennett depicts Britten in a 2009 play The Habit of Art, set while Britten is composing Death in Venice and centred on a fictional meeting between Britten and Auden. Britten was played in the premiere production by Alex Jennings.

Tony Palmer made three documentary films about Britten: Benjamin Britten & his Festival (1967); A Time There Was (1979); and Nocturne (2013). In 2019, Britten's War Requiem was selected by the U.S. Library of Congress for preservation in the National Recording Registry for being "culturally, historically, and aesthetically significant".

In April 2022 a project to commemorate Britten in Lowestoft was launched by the broadcaster and children's author Zeb Soanes. A maquette of the intended full-sized statue of Britten as a boy was unveiled by the sculptor Ian Rank-Broadley. As of January 2024, £89,000 of £110,000 target had been raised. The statue, Britten as a Boy, was unveiled in October 2025.

=== Centenary ===
In September 2012, to mark the composer's forthcoming centenary, the Britten-Pears Foundation launched "Britten 100", a collaboration of leading organisations in the performing arts, publishing, broadcasting, film, academia and heritage. Among the events were the release of a feature film Benjamin Britten – Peace and Conflict, and a centenary exhibition at the British Library. The Royal Mint issued a 50-pence piece, to mark the centenary – the first time a composer has featured on a British coin.

Centenary performances of the War Requiem were given at eighteen locations in Britain. Opera productions included Owen Wingrave at Aldeburgh, Billy Budd at Glyndebourne, Death in Venice by English National Opera, Gloriana by The Royal Opera, and Peter Grimes, Death in Venice and A Midsummer Night's Dream by Opera North. Peter Grimes was performed on the beach at Aldeburgh, opening the 2013 Aldeburgh Festival in June 2013, with Steuart Bedford conducting and singers from the Chorus of Opera North and the Chorus of the Guildhall School of Music and Drama, described by The Guardian as "a remarkable, and surely unrepeatable achievement."

Internationally, the anniversary was marked by performances of the War Requiem, Peter Grimes and other works in four continents. In the US the centennial events were described as "coast to coast", with a Britten festival at Carnegie Hall, and performances at the New York Philharmonic, the Metropolitan Opera and Los Angeles Opera.
