= English National Opera commissions and premieres =

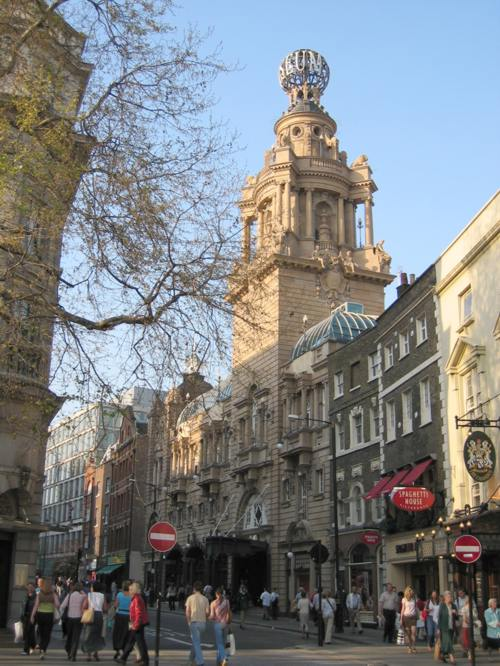
The London Coliseum, home of English National Opera

English National Opera (ENO) is an opera company based in London, resident at the London Coliseum in St Martin's Lane. It is one of the two principal opera companies in London, along with the Royal Opera, Covent Garden. ENO's productions are sung in English. The company, formerly known as Sadler's Wells Opera, has long had a policy of commissioning new works, and has staged many world and British premieres.

== Commissions ==
The company's commissions, some of them jointly with other organisations, include:

- The Story of Vasco (Gordon Crosse, 1974)
- Anna Karenina (Iain Hamilton, 1981)
- The Plumber's Gift (David Blake, 1989)
- The Bacchae (John Buller, 1992)
- Inquest of Love (Jonathan Harvey, 1993)
- Life with an Idiot (Alfred Schnittke, 1995, co-commission)
- Doctor Ox's Experiment (Gavin Bryars, 1998, co-commissioned with the BBC)
- From Morning to Midnight (David Sawer, 2001)
- A Better Place (Martin Butler, 2001)
- The Early Earth Operas (John Browne, 2004)
- The Bitter Tears of Petra von Kant (Gerald Barry, 2005, co-commissioned with RTÉ)
- Gaddafi: A Living Myth (Asian Dub Foundation, 2006)
- The Duchess of Malfi (Torsten Rasch, 2006)
- Two Boys (Nico Muhly, 2011, co-commissioned with the Metropolitan Opera, New York).
- Sunken Garden (Michel van der Aa, 2013, co-commissioned with the Barbican Centre, Luminato, Opéra National de Lyon and the Holland Festival)
- Between Worlds (Tansy Davies, 2015, co-commissioned with the Barbican Centre)
- The Winter's Tale (Ryan Wigglesworth, 2017)

== World premieres ==
Among the world premieres given by Sadler's Wells and ENO are:

- Peter Grimes (Benjamin Britten, 1945)
- The Mines of Sulphur (Richard Rodney Bennett, 1965)
- The Violins of Saint-Jacques (Malcolm Williamson, 1966)
- Lucky Peter's Journey (Malcolm Williamson, 1969)
- The Royal Hunt of the Sun (Iain Hamilton, 1977)
- Toussaint (David Blake, 1977)
- The Mask of Orpheus, (Harrison Birtwistle, 1986)
- Clarissa (Robin Holloway, 1990)
- Timon of Athens (Stephen Oliver, 1991)
- The Silver Tassie (Mark-Anthony Turnage (1999)
- Marnie (Nico Muhly, 2017)

== British premieres ==
British stage premieres include:

- Original Mussorgsky version of Boris Godunov (1935)
- Simon Boccanegra (1948)
- Káťa Kabanová (1951)
- Oedipus Rex (1960)
- The Rise and Fall of the City of Mahagonny (1963)
- The Makropoulos Case (1964)
- War and Peace (1972)
- The Devils of Loudon (1973)
- The Bassarids (1974)
- Bomarzo (1976)
- The Adventures of Mr Brouček (1978)
- Osud (1984)
- Akhnaten (1985)
- Doctor Faust (1986)
- The Making of the Representative for Planet 8 (1988)
- Lear (1989)
- Satyagraha (2007)
- Doctor Atomic (2009)
- The Perfect American (2013)
- Blue (2023)
