= Gavin Carr =

British conductor and baritone

Gavin Carr is a British conductor and baritone working with major choruses in the UK and appearing in opera and concert in the UK and around the globe.

== Biography ==
Gavin Carr is Music Director of the Bournemouth Symphony Chorus, Bath Minerva Choir, is Founder-Director of Chorus Angelorum and, since mid-2018, is Chorus Master of the Philharmonia Chorus. He has guest conducted with the BBC Symphony Chorus and the London Symphony Chorus as well as the Philharmonia Chorus, and in September 2017 was appointed to the vocal faculty of the Royal Academy of Music, where he currently teaches classes in English Song and the Oratorio repertoire. His schedule includes opera and concert performances in Europe and further afield, workshops and masterclasses across the UK, and affiliations with colleges such as Chetham's School of Music, Hawkwood College, and Bath Spa University. He is the brother of composer Paul Carr.

=== Education ===
Carr was born in Croydon, London, the son of Adelaide soprano and Covent Garden Prima Donna Una Hale and Theatre Consultant Martin Carr. He studied at Michael Hall, a Steiner School, and Hurstpierpoint College before going up to King's College, Cambridge to read music and art history, where he was a Choral Scholar in the Chapel Choir. He was a founder member with Stephen Layton of chamber choir Polyphony. After university he emigrated to Australia for five years, where he began his singing and conducting careers working with the Victoria State Opera and the contemporary music group, the Elision Ensemble. He then studied in the US, with Dickson Titus in San Francisco, and at the Ravinia Festival Steans Institute in Chicago with Hakan Hagegard, Barbara Bonney, Martin Katz and Philip Moll. Returning to London he studied with Janice Chapman, and at the Britten-Pears School at Snape, Suffolk, studying with Elly Ameling, Hugues Cuénod, Suzanne Danco, and Galina Vishnevskaya.

In the sphere of conducting, he was assistant conductor at Wexford Festival Opera 2005–7, and at the Cantiere d'arte di Montepulciano with Jan Latham-Koenig 2003–5, and on various opera and concert productions throughout Europe, and also observed Sir Charles Mackerras on productions with English National Opera.

=== Singing career ===
He has appeared in concert and recital at festivals such as Aldeburgh, Brighton, Dartington, Halle, Ravinia and Sydney and with major orchestras and choruses worldwide, recording for Australian Radio, the BBC and German radio. In Australia with Pipeline Ensemble and the Astra Chamber Music Society he premiered a host of new works and has premiered numerous songs, cantatas and song-cycles, including Michael Finnissy's Not Afraid and Medea; and Alison Bauld's Where should Othello Go?, dedicated to him by the composer. In opera he has sung for in the UK (ENO Barber of Seville, Dido and Aeneas, Four Saints in Three Acts), France (Paris Opéra école lyrique Falstaff, Opéra Nomade Lucia di Lammermoor), Ireland (Opera Ireland Giulio Cesare), Australia (Sydney Transfigured Nights Festival Finnissy Shameful Vice) and Italy (Montepulciano Tippett Knot Garden).

He continues to appear internationally as a singer, most recently in Britten’s War Requiem with the Estonian Philharmonic Chorus and Orchestra under Jan Latham-Koenig, and also at the Opera Municipal, Santiago, Chile and with the Novaya Opera, Moscow. Other recent appearances have included concerts with the Flanders Symphony Orchestra in Schoenberg's Ode to Napoleon Buonaparte.

=== Conducting career ===
In 2003 Gavin Carr returned to conducting after a lengthy hiatus. Early studies and apprenticeships for this role included directorship of The Athenaeum Singers in Warminster, studying under Sir Charles Mackerras ENO), and taking positions as Assistant Conductor at the Cantiere Internazionale d'Arte di Montepulciano under Jan Latham-Koenig (Tippett's Knot Garden, Henze's Das Wundertheater and Weill's Mahagonny Songspiel) and at the Wexford Festival under David Agler (Donizetti's Maria di Rohan, Fauré's Pénélope, Susa's Transformations, Dvořák's Rusalka and Donizetti's Don Gregorio). He made his operatic conducting debut at Wexford with the Peter Brook version of Bizet’s Carmen, which was nominated for ‘Best Opera Production of 2007’ in the Irish Times National Arts Awards.

In 2006 he was appointed Associate Principal Conductor of the Bath Philharmonia, with whom he premiered Paul Carr's Requiem for An Angel – now a staple on the choral scene, with numerous performances in the UK and North America.

In April 2007 Gavin Carr made his debut with the English Chamber Orchestra, conducting Emma Kirkby, Sarah Connolly and James Gilchrist in the St Matthew Passion in Bath Abbey. For this concert he formed a new chamber choir, Chorus Angelorum, with which he has gone on to record two CDs of his brother's Choral music – Requiem for an Angel, and Seven Last Words from the Cross.

In 2007 he became Chorus Master of the South West Festival Chorus and Music Director of Bath Minerva Choir. In 2009 he was appointed Music Director of Bristol Bach Choir – a position he held for two years. In September of that year he was appointed Chorus Director of the Bournemouth Symphony Chorus, with whom he has toured internationally and led major work-premieres; these include the major new oratorio by Richard Blackford, Not in our Time, for the Cheltenham Festival 2011, with the Bournemouth Symphony Chorus and the Bournemouth Symphony Orchestra – this was toured in 2012 to Chicago, with the Northwestern University orchestra, and in 2013 to Bremen, with the Bremer Philharmoniker. The CD of the work was released by Nimbus Records in 2011. 2014 saw the choir premiere the jazz-fusion piece Invocation, by celebrated young British Jazz composer and pianist Robert Mitchell, for the London Jazz Festival at the Queen Elizabeth Hall.

In 2011 he was appointed Chorus Master by the Wexford Festival Opera to establish and develop a new fully professional opera chorus using promising young artists from around the globe; this position entailed relinquishing his post with Bristol Bach Choir. The Wexford job brought him into contact with leading young artists from around the world, and he established the programme to function as a young artists' programme within the Festival, with careful developmental casting and programming, working in close association with David Agler, the Festival's Artistic Director.

He began working with the Philharmonia Chorus as a guest conductor in 2010, and in 2015 established a similar relationship with the BBC Symphony Chorus. In 2018 he appeared as a guest chorus master with the London Symphony Chorus. In June 2018 he was appointed Chorus Master of the Philharmonia Chorus in succession to Stefan Bevier. He is in demand for workshops with choirs across the country, and has begun an association with Hawkwood College in the Cotswolds, where he leads masterclasses on a hugely varied repertoire, including the Montverdi Vespers, the choral music of Eric Whitacre, Russian choral repertoire and Italian Opera Choruses.

In 2014 Carr conducted Un Ballo in Maschera for Dorset Opera, in a cast featuring Svetlana Kasyan, Luis Chapa, and Dame Rosalind Plowright. These performances led to an engagement for 2015 to conduct Eugene Onegin, with a cast including Mark Stone, Anna Patalong, Diana Mpntague, David Rendall and Brindley Sherratt.

The years 2013–15 saw him conduct his first War Requiem (BSC-BSO; Gilchrist, Loges, Kasyan), and his first Mahler 8 (Bournemouth and Bath forces, with the Amadeus Orchestra; they saw the establishment of annual Good Friday Passions at the Poole Lighthouse; they also featured tours to Cyprus and France with Chorus Angelorum, and the deepening of his studio practise as a vocal coach in opera and concert repertoire for leading young singers. His ongoing commitment to premiering new work has brought into existence pieces by Owain Park, Paul Carr, and several by his own hand – his cantata Pour out your light, O stars was premiered by Bath Minerva Choir, Southern Sinfonia and William Dazeley in 2014.

== Discography ==
=== Singing releases ===
- Handel: Messiah (with Alison Smart – soprano, William Towers – counter-tenor, Michael Hart-Davies – tenor, St Michael's Singer and the English Symphony Orchestra, William Boughton – conductor), Nimbus (2003)

=== Conducting releases ===
- Paul Carr: Requiem for an Angel (with Sophie Bevan – soprano, Mark Stone – baritone, Chorus Angelorum and the Bath Philharmonia), Stone Records (2010)
- Richard Blackford: Not in our Time (with Paul Nilon – tenor, Stephen Gadd – baritone, Bournemouth Symphony Chorus, Bournemouth Symphony Youth Chorus, Bournemouth Symphony Orchestra), Nimbus Records (2011)
- Paul Carr: Seven Last Words from the Cross (with William Dazeley – baritone, Chorus Angelorum, and the Bath Philharmonia, Stone records 2013
