= Philharmonia Chorus =

Independent self-governing symphony chorus based in London

The Philharmonia Chorus is an independent self-governing symphony chorus based in London, UK. Since its foundation in 1957 the Chorus has given over 900 concerts and made over 100 recordings. The Chorus Master is Gavin Carr.

== Foundation ==
The Philharmonia Chorus was founded in early 1957 by EMI as a choral counterpart to their in-house recording orchestra, the Philharmonia Orchestra, founded twelve years earlier. The Chorus’s first concert, a performance on 12 November 1957 of Beethoven's Ninth Symphony, completed a cycle of Beethoven symphonies in London’s Royal Festival Hall with the Philharmonia Orchestra conducted by Otto Klemperer and was recorded with the same performers.

The principal mover in both ventures was Walter Legge who, to create his chorus, turned to Wilhelm Pitz, then chorus master of the Bayreuth Festival. Between the first rehearsal in February 1957 and first concert there was a long period of preparation during which Pitz rehearsed the Chorus in not only the scheduled Beethoven but also in choral passages from Wagner’s Die Meistersinger von Nürnberg. From that preparatory work emerged a chorus unique for its blend of the British choral tradition and German musical training and discipline, and for a dramatic quality found more typically in opera than in a symphony chorus. The full yet homogeneous and professionally disciplined sound immediately attracted critical notice.

== Early years ==
Under Legge’s management and Pitz’s training the Chorus worked with many distinguished conductors of the time: Wolfgang Sawallisch, Sir Thomas Beecham, Herbert von Karajan, Leopold Stokowski, Sir John Barbirolli, Sir Adrian Boult and, in a relationship that became especially close, Carlo Maria Giulini. Benchmark recordings of Lucia di Lammermoor with Maria Callas and Tullio Serafin, Sir William Walton conducting his own Belshazzar's Feast, Brahms's Ein deutsches Requiem, Beethoven’s Fidelio and Mahler’s Second Symphony under Klemperer, and Verdi's Requiem and Quattro pezzi sacri with Giulini won particular acclaim. Tours followed to the Edinburgh Festival, to Lucerne, and with Giulini to Parma where the audience in the Teatro Regio paid the Chorus the compliment of showering carnations on the British chorus singing Verdi to Italians.

== Self-governance ==
When Legge relinquished management in 1964, the re-formed New Philharmonia Chorus became a self-governing body independent of both EMI and the New Philharmonia Orchestra with a Council of Management of twelve Directors elected by the members, a system of governance which remains in place today. The first concert of both New Philharmonia Orchestra and New Philharmonia Chorus took place on 27 October 1964, a performance of Beethoven’s Ninth Symphony again conducted by Klemperer. In succeeding years the Chorus performed and recorded works with further renowned conductors: Pierre Boulez, Lorin Maazel, George Szell, Daniel Barenboim and Rafael Frühbeck de Burgos (notable recordings of Mendelssohn’s Elijah, Orff’s Carmina Burana and Haydn's Die Schöpfung), Colin Davis (a memorable concert performance of Hector Berlioz's Les Troyens) and further collaborations with Walton, Benjamin Britten conducting his Spring Symphony, and a landmark performance, later released on LP and then CD, of Britten’s War Requiem conducted by Giulini, with Britten himself conducting the chamber ensemble. During the 1960s the Chorus was considered by many critics to be the finest symphony chorus in the UK and perhaps also in Europe.

On his retirement in 1971, Wilhelm Pitz was succeeded as Chorus Master by Walter Hagen-Groll (from the Deutsche Oper of West Berlin), in 1975 by Norbert Balatsch (chorus master of both the Vienna State Opera and the Bayreuth Festival), in 1980 by Heinz Mende (former chorus master of the Chor des Bayerischen Rundfunks in Munich), and then in 1984 by Horst Neumann (chorus master of the MDR Rundfunkchor in Leipzig, East Germany).

== Reinstatement of the original name ==
On 1 September 1977 the Chorus was able to take back its former name, Philharmonia Chorus, and later the same month gave two performances of Mahler’s Eighth Symphony in Belgium with the similarly reinstated Philharmonia Orchestra under Michael Tilson Thomas.

These years saw the Chorus tour widely throughout Europe: several staged operas in the Roman Théâtre antique d’Orange, Haydn’s Die Schöpfung in Paris and London to mark the UK’s entry into the European Economic Community in 1973, Handel’s Judas Maccabaeus with Sir Charles Mackerras at the Teatro alla Scala Milan in 1980 followed ten years later by a second appearance at La Scala in Bach’s Mass in B minor under Giulini. A 1979 recording of Mozart’s Requiem with the Philharmonia Orchestra conducted by Giulini won the 1981 Grammy Award for Best Choral Performance.

In the UK there were engagements with Riccardo Muti (including a 1979 recording of Carmina Burana which in 2021 was BBC Record Review's choice for best recording of the work), Sir Georg Solti, Lovro von Matačić, Giuseppe Sinopoli - appointed Principal Conductor of the Philharmonia Orchestra in 1984 and with whom the Chorus also appeared in Parma, Taormina and Rome (Gurre-Lieder with the Accademia Nazionale di Santa Cecilia) - Rafael Kubelik, Kurt Sanderling (including the Chorus's second recording of Beethoven's Ninth Symphony), Sir Andrew Davis, Seiji Ozawa, Vladimir Ashkenazy, Bernard Haitink, Charles Dutoit, and in 1980 the Chorus's first appearance at the Royal Opera House Covent Garden in a performance of Verdi’s Requiem at the Rudolf Kempe Memorial Concert. A second appearance in the same House six years later in Britten’s War Requiem with the City of Birmingham Symphony Orchestra conducted by Sir Simon Rattle was a Memorial Concert for Sir Peter Pears. These years also saw the Chorus appearing regularly in the UK outside London with notable visits to Cardiff, Brighton, Nottingham, Derby, Cheltenham, Cambridge and Aldeburgh. At Aldeburgh in 1985 the Chorus gave the world première of Britten's unfinished final composition Praise We Great Men, with the Philharmonia Orchestra under Mstislav Rostropovich, and three years later took part in a semi-staged performance of Britten's Paul Bunyan. In the same year, 1988, a particular honour was paid the Chorus: an invitation to perform in Mahler’s Eighth Symphony in Amsterdam’s Concertgebouw to mark the 100th Anniversary of the Concertgebouw Orchestra and concert hall, the hall’s re-opening after renovations, and Bernard Haitink’s last concerts as chief conductor of the Concertgebouw Orchestra.

== New horizons ==
In 1992 David Hill became Chorus Master and Artistic Director. Director of Music at Westminster Cathedral and later at Winchester Cathedral, he was the first Briton to hold the post. He was succeeded in 1998 by Robert Dean, formerly Head of Music at Scottish Opera and Professor of Singing at the Guildhall School of Music & Drama. In these years the Chorus performed Rachmaninov’s Vespers in Westminster and Winchester Cathedrals and recorded it, accompanied Luciano Pavarotti “in the Park” and at Leeds Castle, remixed Beatles numbers, and performed before HM The Queen for the 50th Anniversary of VE Day. At London's Royal Festival Hall, its traditional home, the Chorus appeared regularly with Claus Peter Flor and Leonard Slatkin, both Principal Guest Conductors of the Philharmonia Orchestra.

In December 1997 the Chorus celebrated its 40th Birthday with the Patron, HRH The Prince of Wales, in attendance at a Gala performance of Verdi’s Requiem with the Philharmonia Orchestra conducted by James Levine, followed three days later by a performance of Mahler’s Eighth Symphony with the same conductor. During this period the Chorus performed for the first time with Valery Gergiev and Sir Mark Elder, and sang under the baton of Sir Edward Heath at his 80th Birthday concert in Salisbury Cathedral, performing there also in Symphony for the Spire. Several European tours of Beethoven's Ninth Symphony followed with Giulini and the European Community Youth Orchestra, with Sir Yehudi Menuhin and the Sinfonia Varsovia, and in December 1999 with Sir Simon Rattle and the Orchestra of the Age of Enlightenment, culminating in a Millennium Concert broadcast by BBC Television from Ely Cathedral. Other overseas tours took place to Strasbourg, to Baltimore (the Chorus's first visit to the US) and in 2000 the Chorus performed in the Vatican's Paul VI Audience Hall for Pope John Paul II on his 80th birthday, the latter two tours with the Philharmonia Orchestra under Gilbert Levine. In autumn 2002 the Chorus joined the orchestra and chorus of Norddeutscher Rundfunk and the BBC Singers in the presence of the President of Germany Johannes Rau and former Soviet leader Mikhail Gorbachev for a concert of reconciliation, Britten’s War Requiem conducted by Mstislav Rostropovich, performed in the Turbine Hall of the former Nazi rocket development factory in Peenemünde, north Germany.

In 2004, following a semi-staged concert performance of Weber’s Der Freischütz at the Edinburgh Festival the previous year, Sir Charles Mackerras agreed to become the Chorus’s first President, which post he held until his death in 2010. The 50th anniversary was celebrated in June 2007 with a performance of Verdi’s Requiem with the Philharmonia Orchestra under Riccardo Muti in the presence of the Patron HRH The Prince of Wales. In Autumn 2008 Edward Caswell became Artistic Director, training the Chorus for a performance of Bernstein’s Kaddish Symphony in London’s Barbican Centre conducted by John Axelrod in a concert to mark the 70th Anniversary of Kristallnacht.

2010 saw a return to the Philharmonia Chorus's tradition of German musical training with the appointment as Chorus Master of the Berlin-based conductor Stefan Bevier who was himself also a singer as well as being a former player with the Berlin Philharmonic Orchestra.

In the same year was launched the Philharmonia Chorus Professional Singer Scheme, through which specially auditioned professional singers in the early years of their career join a pool, to be drawn on when required. This was followed in 2013 by the Student Singer Scheme to attract to the Chorus as members young singers with potential to progress to a professional career. The resultant choral make-up thus blends volunteer amateur singers with student and professional singers.

The Chorus’s performing repertory continues to combine new or seldom heard works with choral staples. The Chorus gave the London première of Jeajoon Ryu’s Sinfonia da Requiem with the Royal Philharmonic Orchestra, and the world première of John Powell’s A Prussian Requiem with the Philharmonia Orchestra. The Chorus's appearances in almost every season at the “Easter at King’s” Festival founded by Sir Stephen Cleobury have included James MacMillan’s St John Passion of 2008 in the presence of the composer, Frank Martin’s Golgotha in the presence of the composer’s widow, and Herbert Howells’s Stabat Mater, all broadcast by BBC Radio from King's College Chapel, Cambridge. Opera in concert performances have included Der fliegende Holländer, Fidelio, Die Fledermaus and Don Giovanni. There have been recordings with Benjamin Zander of Beethoven’s Ninth Symphony and Mahler’s Second Symphony. Performances including Brahms’s Ein deutsches Requiem, Beethoven’s Ninth Symphony and Missa solemnis, Mahler’s Second and Eighth Symphonies, Britten’s War Requiem and Verdi’s Requiem have been given with conductors including Christoph von Dohnányi, Charles Dutoit, Daniele Gatti, Daniel Harding, Vladimir Jurowski, Lorin Maazel, Paul McCreesh, Andris Nelsons, Sir Roger Norrington, Gianandrea Noseda, Vasily Petrenko and Esa-Pekka Salonen. Other highlights have included performances of Berlioz’s Grande Messe des morts with the Orchestre National de Lyon under Leonard Slatkin in Lyon and in the composer’s birthplace of La Côte-St-André, and Beethoven’s Missa solemnis under Sir Jeffrey Tate in 2017's week-long opening festival of Hamburg’s remarkable new Elbphilharmonie, the Chorus being the sole British group to be featured therein. The Chorus has also performed in live showings of the films Amadeus, Breakfast at Tiffany's and Gladiator. A performance in Hamburg of Elgar’s The Dream of Gerontius conducted by Sir Jeffrey Tate, a former member of the Chorus, led to his appointment as President, which position he held until his death in 2017.

== Recent developments ==
The Chorus has continued to tour abroad, performing in Germany at the Rheingau Festival, and in Spain and France, with several appearances in Valencia with the Orquesta de Valencia conducted by Yaron Traub and in Lille with the Orchestre National de Lille including a cycle of Mahler Symphonies under Alexandre Bloch and Poulenc's late work Sept répons des ténèbres. The Chorus's 60th Anniversary in November 2017 was celebrated with a performance of Walton’s Belshazzar’s Feast with the Philharmonia Orchestra conducted by Edward Gardner.

Following Stefan Bevier's death in January 2018, another singer and conductor, Gavin Carr, was appointed Chorus Master. Before Covid-19 brought activity to a halt he had prepared the Chorus for performances in London (including Mahler 2 under Jakub Hrůša), Bath and Lille, including a performance in March 2019, captured on DVD, of Berlioz's Grande Messe des morts with the Philharmonia Orchestra in St Paul's Cathedral under John Nelson to mark the sesquicentenary of the composer's death.

The Chorus re-started in September 2021 following Covid-19 with a performance of Belshazzar's Feast with the Royal Philharmonic Orchestra under their Music Director Vasily Petrenko. Since then with the same forces the Chorus has performed in The Dream of Gerontius, War Requiem, Mahler's three choral symphonies and in 2023 a concert performance of Tchaikovsky's one-act opera Iolanta. In an unusual combination, the full Philharmonia Chorus partnered the Academy of Ancient Music conducted by Laurence Cummings in a well-received performance at the 2023 BBC Proms of Handel's oratorio Samson. The Chorus has performed in live showings of The Lord of the Rings (film series) and there have been other appearances in London, King's College Cambridge and Lille, where in all three cities the Chorus performed during 2024-25, notably in semi-staged performances in Lille of Puccini's opera La bohème and performances in Lille and Paris of Shostakovich's Symphony 13 Babi Yar with Orchestre national de Lille conducted by Joshua Weilerstein. In 2026 in London the Chorus has sung Verdi's Requiem with the Philharmonia under Riccardo Muti and Sergei Taneyev's John of Damascus with the Royal Philharmonic Orchestra under Vasily Petrenko.

== Chorus Masters ==
- 1957-1971 Wilhelm Pitz
- 1971-1975 Walter Hagen-Groll
- 1975-1980 Norbert Balatsch
- 1980-1983 Heinz Mende
- 1984-1992 Horst Neumann
- 1992-1998 David Hill (Artistic Director)
- 1998-2007 Robert Dean (Artistic Director)
- 2008-2010 Edward Caswell (Artistic Director)
- 2010-2018 Stefan Bevier
- 2018- Gavin Carr

== Accompanists ==
The Chorus has had four Accompanists: first, Viola Tunnard, followed in 1962 by her duet partner Martin Penny, both collaborators with Britten at Aldeburgh. From 1984 to 2012, the Accompanist was Stephen Rose, Senior Coach at the Opera department of the Guildhall School of Music & Drama and of the National Opera Studio in London. The current Accompanist is multiple prize-winner Timothy End.

Chairman: Richard Harding
