= The Winter's Tale (opera) =

Opera, UK, 2017

The Winter's Tale is an opera in three acts by Ryan Wigglesworth. The libretto is by the composer, based on the play of the same name by William Shakespeare. The opera, in a production directed by Rory Kinnear, and conducted by the composer, was premiered at the English National Opera on 27 February 2017.

== Roles ==
Role	Voice type	Premiere cast, 27 February 2017 (Conductor: Ryan Wigglesworth)
Leontes, King of Sicilia	bass-baritone	Iain Paterson
Hermione, his wife	soprano	Sophie Bevan
Perdita, their daughter	mezzo-soprano	Samantha Price
Mamillius, their son	(silent role)	Zach Roberts
Polixenes, King of Bohemia	baritone	Leigh Melrose
Florizel, his son	tenor	Anthony Gregory
Paulina, Hermione's lady-in-waiting	mezzo-soprano	Susan Bickley
Antigonus, her husband	bass-baritone	Neil Davies
Camillo, aide to Polixenes	tenor	Timothy Robinson

== Synopsis ==
The opera follows the main story of the play, reduced to three acts, and dropping the character Autolycus, and some other well-known features of the play such as Antigonus's stage direction "Exit, pursued by a bear".

Act I is set in Sicily. Leontes is hosting his old friend Polixenes on a long visit; Leontes's wife Hermione is heavily pregnant. Leontes becomes obsessed with the notion that Polixenes is the father of the unborn child. He puts his wife on trial, even though the oracle of Apollo declares her to be innocent. The death of Mamillius, the son of Leontes and Hermione, during the trial causes Hermione to collapse, and to give birth. Hermione is assumed dead. The distraught Leontes orders Antigonus to abandon the newborn child, whom Antigonus names Perdita, in a distant land.

Act II is set in Bohemia, some sixteen years later. Perdita has grown up adopted by a shepherd. Polixenes's son Florizel has fallen in love with her. To escape the wrath of Polixenes at his son's attachment to a lowly shepherdess they flee at the suggestion of Camillo to Sicily. In Act III, set in Sicily, the repentant Leontes is overjoyed to rediscover his daughter. He appeases the pursuing Polixenes, and at the suggestion of Paulina they go to view a statue of Hermione. The statue comes to life and forgives Leontes.

== Reception ==
The opera received a mixed reception from critics. Guy Dammann wrote in The Times Literary Supplement that the opera "represents a remarkable achievement for Wigglesworth. Perhaps its most striking feature is the complete self-assurance of its restraint." Rupert Christiansen, in the Daily Telegraph, found that the composer, using an idiom which was "a sugar-coated mélange of Berg and Tippett" had "reduc[ed] the play’s ambiguities and resonances to something charmless, turgid and unmoving." In The Observer, on the other hand, Fiona Maddocks called the score "fluid and sensuous, building on the tradition of Britten and Tippett but with plenty of individuality." George Hall, in The Stage, hailed it as "the major event of ENO’s current season", rated Kinnear's production highly, found the score "accomplished" and praised the individual performances, whilst noting that overall "the play has once again eluded the operatic medium." Cara Chanteau in The Independent gave the production four stars out of five, found Sophie Bevan "radiant" as Hermione, but conceded that Wigglesworth's score was "just a tad too respectful to blaze as incandescently as it might." William Hartston in the Express claimed "I cannot remember enjoying a new opera so much" whilst extolling how the music "emphasizes the action in an impressive and remarkable way, particularly considering they fact that this is the young British composer's first opera."
