= Una Hale =

Australian operatic soprano

Una Rosalind Hale (18 November 1922 – 4 March 2005) was an Australian operatic soprano, mainly known in her native country and in the United Kingdom.

== History ==
Hale was born in Wayville, South Australia to Unitarian minister George Ernest Hale and Florence Elizabeth Hale, née Picken. She was educated at Adelaide's Methodist Ladies' College and the Adelaide Conservatorium. She left for Britain in 1946 to study at the Royal College of Music and appeared with the Carl Rosa Opera Company from 1949 to 1954, playing many leading roles, such as Violetta in Verdi's La Traviata Micaela Carmen and Marguerite in Gounod's Faust.

In 1954, Hale was engaged as a principal soprano at the Royal Opera, Covent Garden, where she sang most of the major lyric soprano roles. She was particularly noted for her portrayals of Ellen Orford in Britten's Peter Grimes, Eva in Wagner's Die Meistersinger von Nürnberg, The Marschallin in Richard Strauss's Der Rosenkavalier, and Liu in Puccini's Turandot. In 1956, she portrayed Naomi in the world première of Lennox Berkeley's opera, Ruth. The production was mounted by the English Opera Group with Anna Pollak singing the title role and Peter Pears portraying Boaz.

In 1962, Hale sang the title role in the Australian première of Strauss's Ariadne auf Naxos by the S.A. Symphony Orchestra under Charles Mackerras, as part of the Adelaide Festival. During that same season, she also portrayed Donna Anna in Mozart's Don Giovanni and Alice Ford in Verdi's Falstaff. From 1963 to 1964, she sang Ellen Orford and Tosca with the Sadler's Wells Opera Company, and Tosca and The Marschallin in Romania with the Romanian National Opera. In 1960, she married Martin Carr, at that time Technical Director of the Royal Ballet – subsequently a theatre consultant – and retired from the stage in 1965 after the births of her sons, the composer Paul Carr and the conductor and chorus master Gavin Carr. She spent the rest of her life in Bath, England.
