= Peter Donohoe (pianist) =

English classical pianist

Peter Donohoe CBE
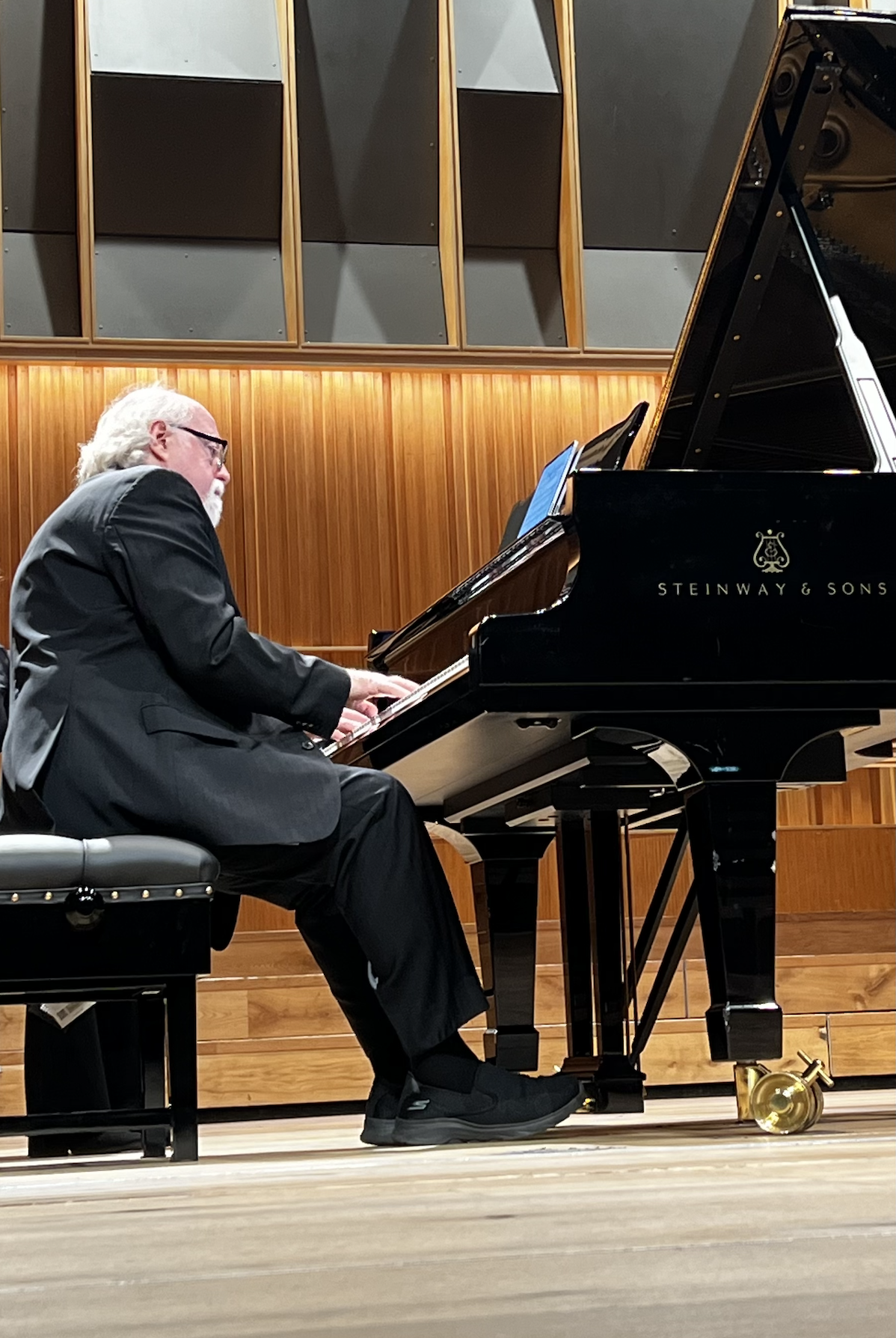
- Donohoe at the Royal Birmingham Conservatoire in 2025

Background information
- Born: 18 June 1953 (age 72); Manchester, England
- Genres: Classical
- Occupations: pianist, educator
- Instrument: Piano
- Years active: 1976–present
- Labels: EMI Records, Hyperion, Naxos
- Website: peter-donohoe.com

Peter Donohoe CBE (born 18 June 1953) is an English classical pianist.

== Biography ==
Peter Donohoe was born in Manchester, England, and educated at Chetham's School of Music where he studied violin, viola, clarinet and tuba. Donald Clarke recommended that Donohoe do an audition at the age of 14 at the Royal Manchester College of Music, as a result, professor Derek Wyndham insisted on taking him as his youngest student. Donohoe continued to work with Wyndham throughout the rest of his schooldays, and then went on to study music with Alexander Goehr at the University of Leeds. Later he returned to Manchester to continue working at the Royal Northern College of Music with Professor Wyndham, graduating in 1976 as BMus with first class honours in both piano and percussion as both teacher and performer.

In 1975 he had been engaged for a trial as timpanist with the BBC Philharmonic, which was the high point in a career in percussion playing that included the formation of a rock group, a percussion ensemble and involvement in many opera and symphonic performances across the UK as both first-call free-lance percussionist and regular extra with many major British symphony orchestras. Later this led to becoming first call extra keyboard player with the BBC Philharmonic, the City of Birmingham Symphony Orchestra, the Royal Liverpool Philharmonic and the Hallé. During his student years he also studied percussion playing with Jack Gledhill – then timpanist with the Hallé – and Gilbert Webster, who had been Principal Percussionist with the BBC Symphony Orchestra, who encouraged his exploration of other disciplines, including the cimbalom, jazz improvisation on the vibraphone, and rock drumming.

However, during his final year as an undergraduate he decided to put all his energies into the piano. After graduating, he spent one year studying with Yvonne Loriod and Olivier Messiaen in Paris. During his student years at the Royal Northern College of Music he had also studied with Vlado Perlemuter, Sir William Glock, Roger Woodward, Charles Rosen and Sequeira Costa. In 1974 and 1975 he attended the Bartók Seminar in Budapest, where he studied with Pál Kadosa and first met his long-term colleague, Zoltán Kocsis.

In 1976 Donohoe entered his first two competitions. The first was the British Liszt Competition in Guildford, England, in which he took third prize. Secondly he entered the Bartók-Liszt Competition in Budapest, Hungary, winning the Special Prize for his performance of Bartók. It was in 1981 that he decided to extend his activities into foreign countries, and entered the Leeds International Piano Competition, in which he was placed sixth. One year later, in July 1982, he won the Joint Silver Medal at the International Tchaikovsky Competition in Moscow – then in the Soviet Union. From his success with the Soviet public and musical colleagues he developed a relationship with Russia that is ongoing.

In the early years of his solo piano career, Donohoe was in demand by many UK recital series and amateur orchestras. Youth orchestras also played a big part in his activities. In 1970 he had joined the Cheshire Youth Orchestra as a percussionist, eventually becoming its percussion tutor, and also housemaster for several courses. On the first course in 1970 he had also played Prokofiev's First Piano Concerto, as well as being the orchestra's timpanist for the rest of the program.

His first significant break with professional orchestras was a result of his regular work as keyboard player with the Hallé, including many performances of the piano part of Stravinsky's Petrushka. The conductor James Loughran offered him an opportunity to give his first solo concerto performance with a professional orchestra in June 1976, the same month in which he graduated from the Royal Northern College of Music and two months before the British Liszt Competition and the Bartók–Liszt Competition. His performance of Rachmaninoff's Rhapsody on a Theme of Paganini launched a long-standing relationship with the Hallé, as well as leading to many invitations to perform as soloist with many other British orchestras. He made his London debut at the Purcell Room in 1979, closely followed by his Last Night of the Proms debut in the same year.

In 1974 he met the conductor Simon Rattle – then 19 years old and having won the John Player International Conductors' Competition that same week. It was Rattle's first performance of Stravinsky's The Rite of Spring – a piece with which he is known to have a special affinity – and Peter Donohoe was the timpanist. This encounter was to develop across the next 25 years, going on to include several foreign orchestral tours, over 50 concerto performances in cities all over the world and many CD piano concerto recordings. The link with the CBSO and Rattle (Rattle was the CBSO's Principal Conductor 1980–1998) brought about his performance in 2002 at Rattle's inaugural concert as chief conductor of the Berlin Philharmonic.

Donohoe was appointed principal conductor and artistic director of the Northern Chamber Orchestra in 1984, a post he relinquished in 1987. He founded the Orchestra of the Mill in 1987 and directed it until 1993 when the orchestra ceased to exist owing to local council funding being withdrawn as a result of rate-capping. In 2000 he was appointed Principal Guest Conductor of the Bath Philharmonia.

Donohoe was appointed a Commander of the Order of the British Empire (CBE) in the 2010 New Year Honours.

Since appearing on the professional stage, he has performed all over the world in solo recitals and chamber music, and in particular as solo artist with many of the world's leading symphony orchestras. These have included professional symphony orchestras in the UK and Ireland, including annual performances at the Proms for seventeen years. Abroad he has played as soloist with a number of major orchestras and conductors.

== Recordings ==
Donohoe exclusively signed with EMI Records in 1988, beginning a relationship that lasted until 1993, producing a major collection of CDs. These recordings tend largely towards 20th century composers such as Olivier Messiaen, Béla Bartók, Igor Stravinsky, Sergei Prokofiev, Alban Berg, George Gershwin, Benjamin Britten and Sergei Rachmaninoff. He preferred to wait until later in life before recording music by romantic and particularly classical composers, making exceptions, however, for music by Franz Liszt, Pyotr Ilyich Tchaikovsky, Frédéric Chopin, Johannes Brahms and Ludwig van Beethoven. His recording of Tchaikovsky's Piano Concerto No. 2 (part of a complete concerto cycle with the Bournemouth Symphony Orchestra recorded 1986-89) won the Gramophone magazine's Concerto Recording of the year in 1988, and his recording of Liszt's Sonata in B minor won the Grand Prix du Disque in 1993. Since then he has made many recordings on a freelance basis with Deutsche Grammophon, Hyperion, Chandos, BMG, Warner and Naxos. In the latter case, a series of recordings devoted to British works for piano and orchestra was inaugurated in 2001, growing to a catalogue of 14 works. In 2022, he recorded for Chandos Dora Pejačević's Piano Concerto with the BBC Symphony Orchestra, conducted by Sakari Oramo.
