= Mark Andrew James =

Mark Andrew James is a conductor of classical music.

James was born in Limassol, Cyprus. He studied conducting and the oboe at Trinity College, London, where he was awarded many prizes enabling him to study further with Franco Ferrara in Siena. Whilst at college, Mark conducted performances of The Marriage of Figaro and Albert Herring at the Collegiate Theatre, London in association with the London Opera Centre.

James also participated in numerous master classes with conductors such as Leonard Bernstein, Zubin Mehta, Sir Georg Solti and Sir Charles Mackerras, where he was given the opportunity of conducting the New York Philharmonic, the Israel Philharmonic and the Juilliard orchestras.

James has conducted extensively in Russia, where he conducted the Yaroslavl Governor's Symphony Orchestra, the Krasnoyarsk Symphony, Voronez Symphony and the Samara Symphony at concerts in St. Petersburg and Moscow, performing programmes of Russian and English music, including Sergei Rachmaninoff's No. 2 and No. 3 and Gustav Holst's The Planets.

James has worked with many orchestras and choirs all over Britain, including Brighton Festival Chorus, Huddersfield Choral Society, Hertfordshire Chorus, the Worthing Philharmonic Choir and the Sussex Chorus in programmes that have included The Dream of Gerontius, Verdi's Requiem, Beethoven's Choral Symphony, Carl Orff's Carmina Burana, Mozart's Requiem and Johann Sebastian Bach's B minor Mass and St Matthew Passion.

In 1993, James founded the Sussex Symphony Orchestra, which is based in Brighton and performs all over the South of England. The orchestra, having both amateur and professional musicians, performs a wide and diverse range of repertoire which has included such works as Igor Stravinsky's The Rite of Spring, Maurice Ravel's Daphnis et Chloé, Dmitri Shostakovich's 5th Symphony, Gustav Mahler's symphonies Nos. 2 & 5, Reinhold Glière's Harp Concerto and James MacMillan's percussion concerto, Veni, Veni Emmanuel.

As well as the standard concerto repertoire, most recently including Beethoven's Emperor Concerto with Philip Fowke and the Dvořák Cello Concerto with Guy Johnston, the orchestra also regularly includes premiere performances of commissioned works by both established and emerging composers, including David Fanshawe, Paul Lewis, Peter Copley and Paul Carr, whose music he has recorded with the orchestra on the ‘Claudio Records’ label.

Amongst the orchestra's most popular concerts under Mark James's direction are the annual Opera Gala, given as part of the Brighton Festival, which showcases many young and rising opera stars of today and a series of summer park prom concerts given throughout the South, to audiences of over 11,000.

As part of his work with the orchestra, Mark James has masterminded the creation of a series of workshops and sessions catering for children of all ages and abilities, through to adult further education by taking sections from the orchestra into schools and colleges, holding seminars and sessions culminating in public concerts.

In recognition of his work with this orchestra, he was nominated for a Creative Briton Award, where individuals are nationally recognised for their contributions to their art. A review in The Times described the orchestra as ‘one of the best of its type in the country’

In addition to his concert activities, James has conducted studio sessions for both film and television at ‘Hear no Evil’ and Angel Recording Studios in London. Films include Being Considered for Spice Factory, Jack Brown and the Curse of the Crown for Little Wing Films and Lady Audely's Secret, a Victorian melodrama for Carlton Television.

Apart from his return visits to Russia, future engagements include a visit to the new Hall for Cornwall in Truro with the Sussex Symphony Orchestra, a performance of Richard Strauss's Four Last Songs with Dame Felicity Lott, concerts of French and English music in France and engagements in Estonia, Moldova and Rio de Janeiro.
