= Paul Carr (composer) =

English classical composer (b. 1961)

Paul Carr (born 1961) is an English classical music composer. Born in Cornwall, he has been writing music since the age of 15. He studied voice at the Guildhall School of Music and Drama and worked in opera stage management before concentrating on composing. He is the brother of conductor Gavin Carr.

He has written a number of classical concertos, often in a lighter style including concertos for clarinet, oboe, flute, piano and viola. He has also scored several British films including Janice Beard 45 WPM, Being Considered, and Lady Audley's Secret. TV work includes the children's series Girls in Love for Granada Television.

A major new work for baritone, chorus and orchestra, 'Seven Last Words from the Cross', was commissioned by Bath Minerva Choir in 2012. The world premiere was given by the Bath Minerva Choir, conducted by Gavin Carr, on 20 April 2013 in Bath Abbey.

== Works ==
- Air For Orchestra
- THE BUSHIDO BLADE (1981)
- Chasing Aunt Sally (for orchestra)
- Chorale (2013)
- Concerto For Clarinet
- Concerto For Oboe
- Concerto For Flute
- Concerto for Two Saxophones & Orchestra
- Diverting Sundays (for wind quintet)
- Forbidden Waltz (for bassoon and piano)
- Gentle Music (for string orchestra)
- Holding The Stars (for unaccompanied choir)
- Jazz Cardigans (for guitar)
- Lamb (for unaccompanied choir)
- Now Comes Beauty (for unaccompanied choir)
- Occasional Postcards (for wind quintet & strings)
- Piano Concerto
- Requiem For An Angel (for soprano and baritone soloists, choir and orchestra)
- Running With Dogs (for clarinet and piano)
- Silent Night (for unaccompanied choir)
- Sonatina (for bassoon and piano)
- Sonatina (for flute & piano)
- Very English Music (for string orchestra)
- Viola Air (for viola and orchestra)
- Viola Concerto
- Clarinet Concerto No.2 (for solo clarinet, percussion and strings)
- Sinfonietta (2017)

== Discography ==
- Seven Last Words from the Cross (with William Dazeley - baritone, Chorus Angelorum, the Bath Philharmonia, Gavin Carr - conductor), Stone Records (2013)
- Requiem For An Angel (with Sophie Bevan - soprano, Mark Stone - baritone, Chorus Angelorum, the Bath Philharmonia, Gavin Carr - conductor), Stone Records (2010)
- British Light Music Premières Dutton Records (2008)
- English String Miniatures Vol. 6 Naxos (2006)
- Crowded Streets Contemporary (2005) (with the Sussex Symphony Orchestra, Mark Andrew James - Conductor)
