= Michael Edwards (British composer) =

British composer

Michael Edwards (born Cheshire, 1968) is a British composer.

Edwards studied oboe and composition with Adrian Beaumont at the University of Bristol, followed by further study at Stanford University. He worked as a software engineer and then as a lecturer at the Universität Mozarteum Salzburg before becoming a lecturer at the University of Edinburgh.

Edwards has composed a wide range of works for both instrumental and electronic media, which have been performed throughout the UK, Europe and North America.
