= The Winter's Tale =

Play by Shakespeare

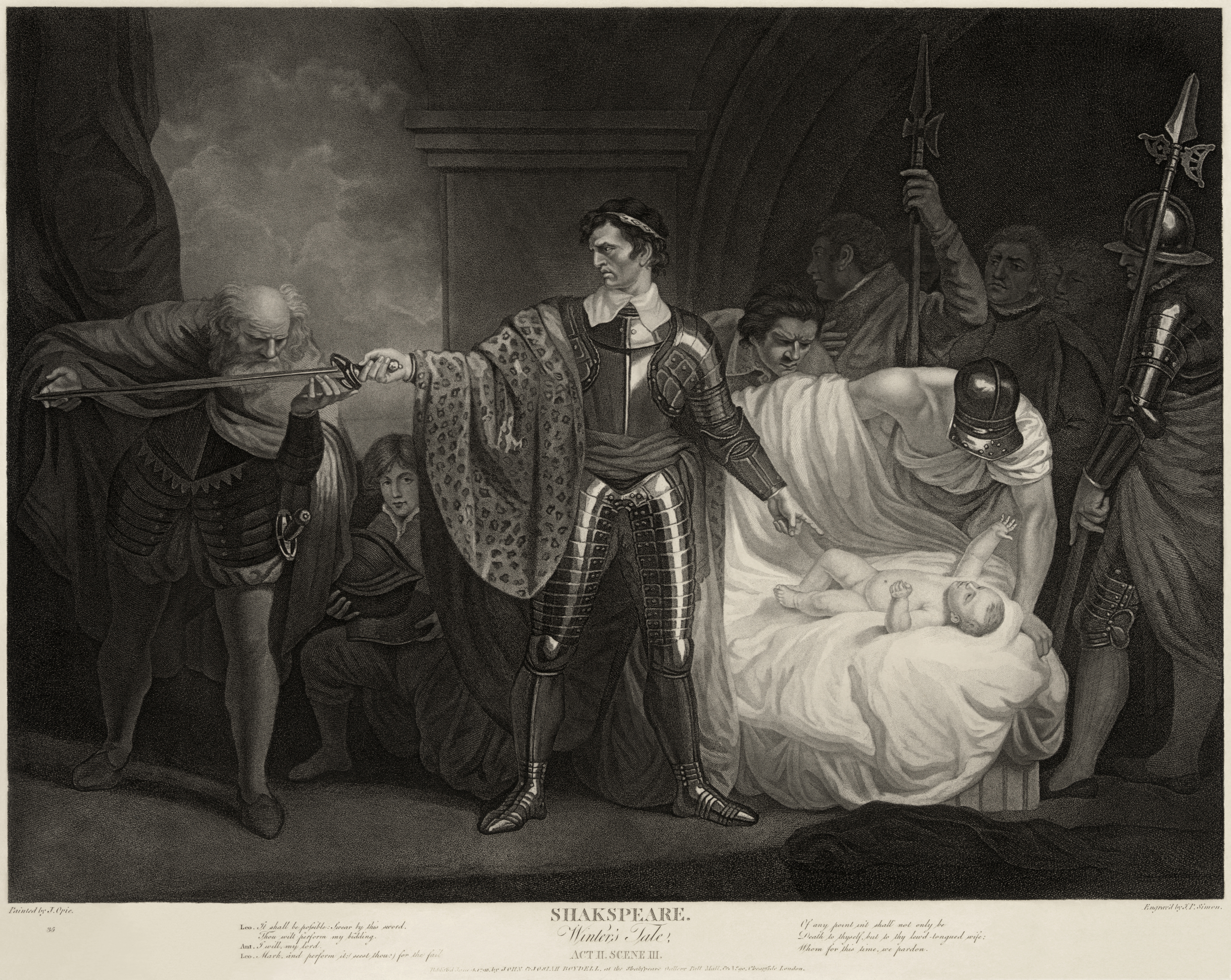
Act II, scene III: Antigonus swears his loyalty to Leontes, in an attempt to save Leontes' young daughter's life. From a painting by John Opie commissioned by the Boydell Shakespeare Gallery for printing and display.

The Winter's Tale is a play by William Shakespeare originally published in the First Folio of 1623. Although it was grouped among the comedies, many modern editors have relabelled the play as one of Shakespeare's late romances. Some critics consider it to be one of Shakespeare's "problem plays" because the first three acts are filled with intense psychological drama, while the last two acts are comic and supply a happy ending.

The play has been intermittently popular, having been revived in productions and adaptations by some of the leading theatre practitioners in Shakespearean performance history. In the mid-18th century, after a long interval without major performances, David Garrick premiered his adaptation Florizel and Perdita (first performed in 1753 and published in 1756). The Winter's Tale was revived again in the 19th century, when the fourth "pastoral" act was widely popular. In the second half of the 20th century, The Winter's Tale was often performed in its entirety, drawn largely from the First Folio text, with varying degrees of success.

== Characters ==
Sicilia

- Leontes – The King of Sicily, and the childhood friend of Polixenes, King of Bohemia.
- Hermione – The virtuous and beautiful Queen of Sicily.
- Camillo – An honest Sicilian nobleman.
- Paulina – A noblewoman of Sicily.
- Antigonus – Paulina's husband, and also a loyal friend of Hermione.
- Dion – A Lord of Sicily.
- Cleomenes – A Lord of Sicily.
- Mamillius – The young prince of Sicily, Leontes and Hermione's son.
- Emilia – One of Hermione's ladies-in-waiting.
- Gaoler – Charged with imprisoning Hermione.
- Mariner – His ship takes Antigonus to Bohemia.

Bohemia

- Polixenes – The King of Bohemia, and Leontes's childhood friend.
- Florizel – Polixenes's only son and heir.
- Perdita – The daughter of Leontes and Hermione, unaware of her royal lineage.
- Shepherd – An old and honourable sheep-tender.
- Clown – or Young Shepherd, the Old Shepherd's buffoonish son, and Perdita's adoptive brother.
- Autolycus – A roguish peddler, vagabond, and pickpocket.
- Mopsa – A shepherdess, in love with Young Shepherd.
- Dorcas – A shepherdess, in love with Young Shepherd.

Other Characters

- Archidamus – A lord of Bohemia, visiting Sicily with his king.
- Lords, servants, gentlemen, ladies in Sicilia
- Shepherds, shepherdesses, servants in Bohemia
- Time, as chorus

== Synopsis ==
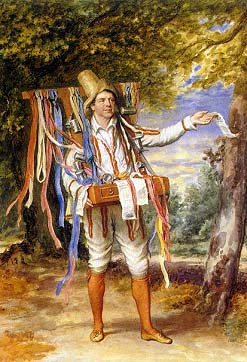
John Fawcett as Autolycus in The Winter's Tale (1828) by Thomas Charles Wageman

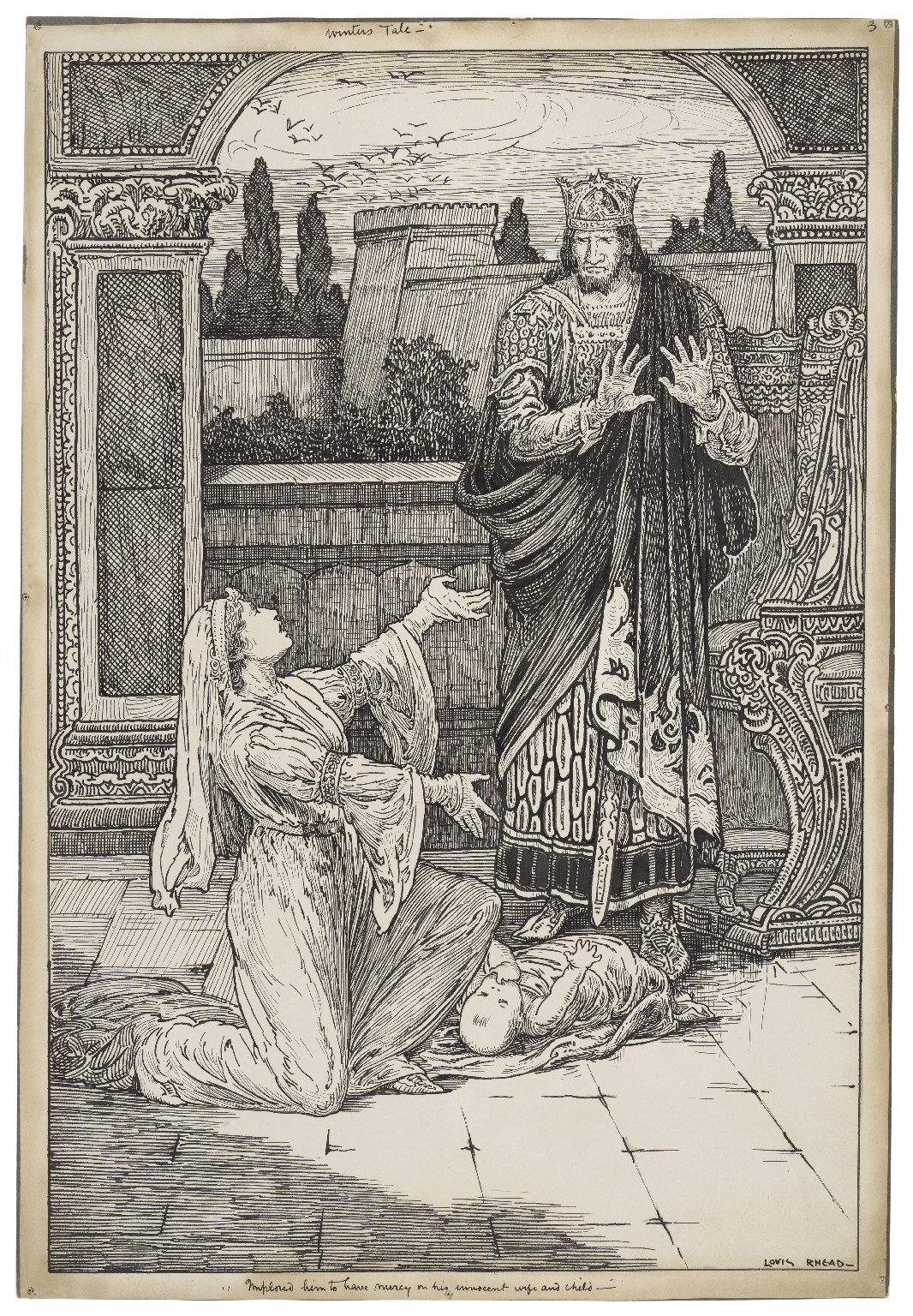
An ink drawing of Act II, Scene III: Paulina imploring Leontes to have mercy on his daughter, Perdita. Illustration was designed for an edition of Lamb's Tales, copyrighted 1918.

Following a brief introductory scene, the play begins with the appearance of two childhood friends: Leontes, King of Sicily, and Polixenes, the King of Bohemia. Polixenes is visiting the kingdom of Sicily, and is enjoying catching up with his old friend. However, after nine months, Polixenes yearns to return to his own kingdom to tend to affairs and see his son. Leontes cannot persuade Polixenes to stay longer, so he decides to send his wife, Queen Hermione, to try to convince him. Hermione agrees and with three short speeches is successful. Leontes is surprised that Hermione could convince Polixenes so easily, so he begins to suspect that his pregnant wife has been having an affair with the other king. Leontes orders Camillo, a Sicilian lord, to poison Polixenes. Camillo instead warns Polixenes and they both flee to Bohemia.

Furious at their escape, Leontes publicly accuses his wife of infidelity and declares that the child she is bearing must be Polixenes' bastard. He throws her in prison, over the protests of his nobles, and sends two of his lords, Cleomenes and Dion, to the Oracle at Delphos for confirmation of his suspicions. Meanwhile, the queen gives birth to a girl, and her loyal friend Paulina takes the baby to the king, hoping that the sight of the child will soften his heart. He grows angrier, however, and orders Paulina's husband, Lord Antigonus, to take the child and abandon it in a desolate place. Cleomenes and Dion return from Delphos with word from the Oracle and find Hermione on trial, asserting her innocence. The Oracle states categorically that Hermione and Polixenes are innocent, that Camillo is an honest man, and that Leontes will have no heir until his lost daughter is found. Leontes refuses to believe the oracle, but soon learns that his son Mamillius has died of a wasting sickness brought on by the accusations against his mother. At this, Hermione falls in a swoon and is carried away by Paulina, who subsequently reports the queen's death to her heartbroken and repentant husband. Leontes vows to spend the rest of his days atoning for the loss of his son, his abandoned daughter, and his queen.

Antigonus, meanwhile, abandons the baby on the coast of Bohemia, reporting that Hermione appeared to him in a dream and bade him name the girl Perdita. He leaves a fardel (a bundle) by the baby containing gold and other trinkets to suggest that the baby is of noble blood. A violent storm suddenly appears, wrecking the ship on which Antigonus arrived. He wishes to take pity on the child, but he is chased away by a bear. Perdita is rescued by a shepherd and his son, also known as "Clown".

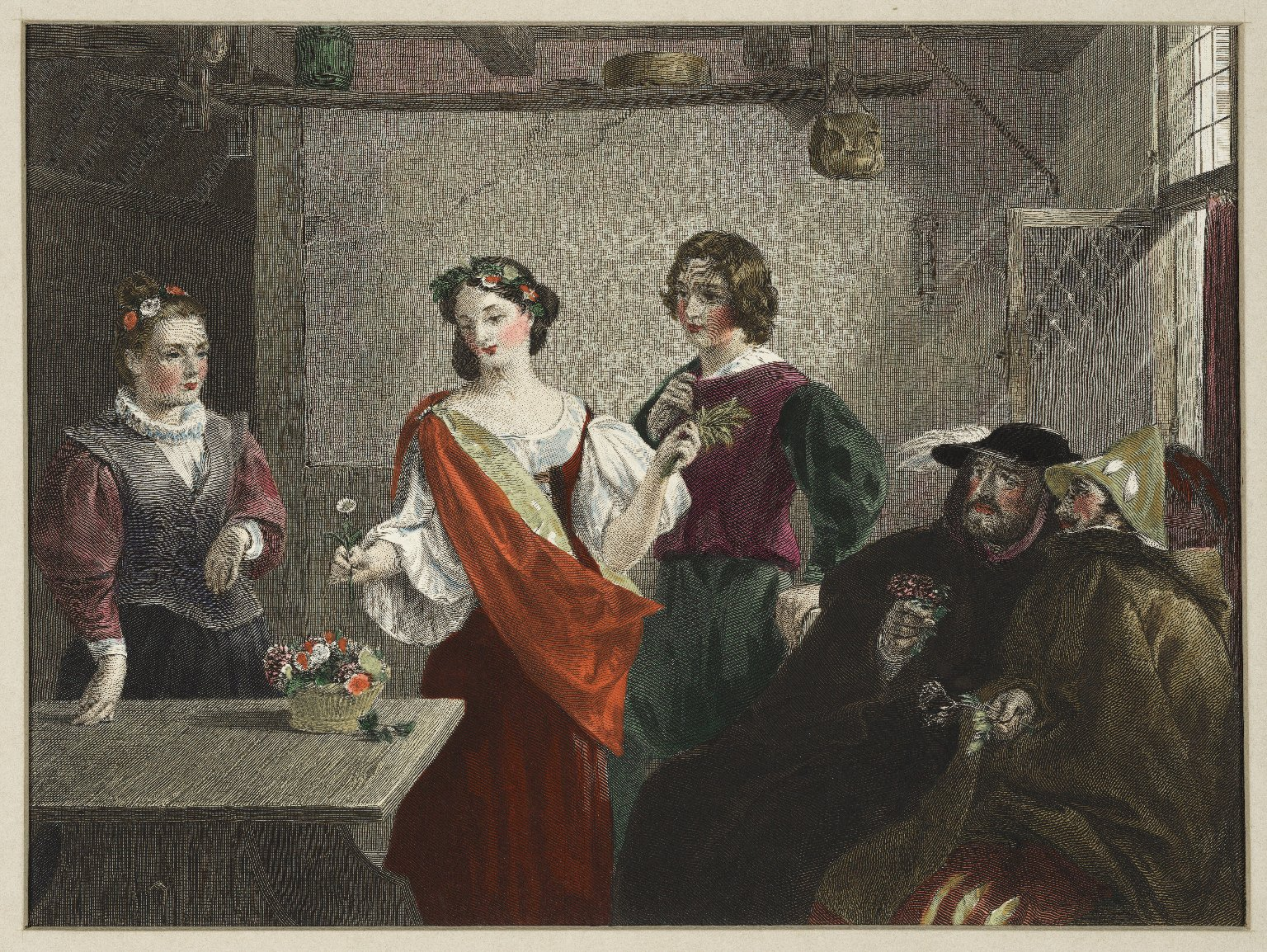
An engraving of Florizel and Perdita by Charles Robert Leslie.

"Time" enters and announces the passage of sixteen years. Camillo, now in the service of Polixenes, begs the Bohemian king to allow him to return to Sicily. Polixenes refuses and reports to Camillo that his son, Prince Florizel, has fallen in love with a lowly shepherd girl, Perdita. He suggests to Camillo that they disguise themselves and attend the sheep-shearing feast where Florizel and Perdita will be betrothed. At the feast, hosted by the Old Shepherd (who has prospered thanks to the gold in the fardel), the pedlar Autolycus picks the pocket of the Young Shepherd and, in various guises, entertains the guests with bawdy songs and the trinkets he sells. Polixenes and Camillo watch, disguised, as Florizel (under the guise of a shepherd named Doricles) and Perdita are betrothed. Polixenes tears off his disguise and intervenes, threatening the Old Shepherd and Perdita with torture and death and ordering his son never to see the shepherd's daughter again. Camillo, still longing for his native land, schemes to send Florizel and Perdita to Sicily, so that Polixenes will bring him along when he pursues them. The lovers take ship for Sicily, as do the two shepherds and Autolycus.

In Sicily, Leontes is still in mourning. Cleomenes and Dion plead with him to end his time of repentance because the kingdom needs an heir. Paulina, however, convinces the king to remain unmarried forever, since no woman can match the greatness of his lost Hermione. Florizel and Perdita arrive and are greeted effusively by Leontes. Florizel pretends to be on a diplomatic mission from his father, but his cover is blown when Polixenes and Camillo, too, arrive in Sicilia. The meeting and reconciliation of the kings and princes is reported by gentlemen of the Sicilian court: how the Old Shepherd raised Perdita, how Antigonus met his end, how Leontes was overjoyed at being reunited with his daughter, and how he begged Polixenes for forgiveness. The Old Shepherd and Young Shepherd, now made gentlemen by the kings, meet Autolycus, who asks them for their forgiveness for his roguery. Leontes, Polixenes, Camillo, Florizel and Perdita then go to Paulina's house in the country, where a statue of Hermione has been recently finished. The sight of his wife's form makes Leontes distraught, but then, to everyone's amazement, the statue shows signs of vitality: it is Hermione, miraculously restored to life—or simply having lived in seclusion with Paulina for the last sixteen years. As the play ends, Perdita and Florizel are engaged, and the whole company celebrates the miracle. Despite this happy ending typical of Shakespeare's comedies and romances, the impression of the unjust death of young prince Mamillius lingers to the end, which, combined with the years wasted in separation, brings an element of unredeemed tragedy to the play.

== Sources ==
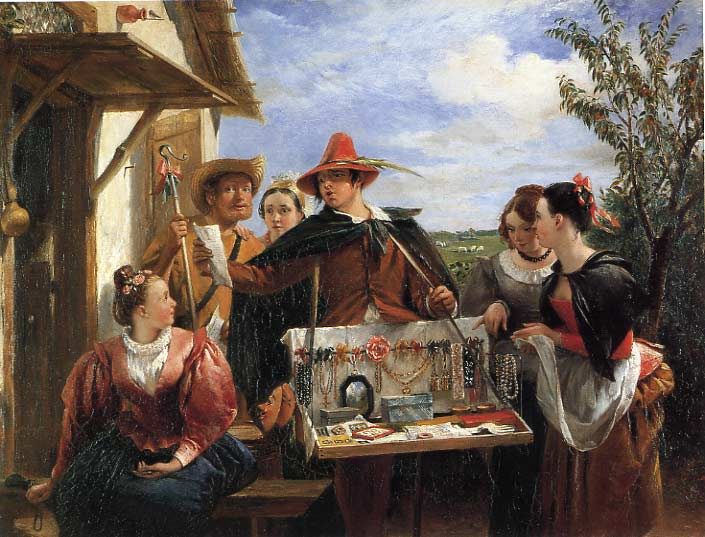
Autolycus (1836) by Charles Robert Leslie

The main plot of The Winter's Tale is taken from Robert Greene's pastoral romance Pandosto, published in 1588. Shakespeare's changes to the plot are uncharacteristically slight, especially in light of the romance's undramatic nature, and Shakespeare's fidelity to it gives The Winter's Tale its most distinctive feature: the sixteen-year gap between the third and fourth acts. This distinctive feature violates the Classical Unities, a set of principles for dramatic tragedies that was introduced in 16th-century Italy based on the work of Aristotle.

There are changes in names, places, and minor plot details, but the largest changes lie in the survival and reconciliation of Hermione and Leontes (Greene's Pandosto) at the end of the play. The character equivalent to Hermione in Pandosto dies after being accused of adultery, while Leontes' equivalent looks back upon his deeds (including an incestuous fondness for his daughter) and slays himself. The survival of Hermione, while presumably intended to create the last scene's coup de théâtre involving the statue, creates a distinctive thematic divergence from Pandosto. Greene follows the usual ethos of Hellenistic romance, in which the return of a lost prince or princess restores order and provides a sense of humour and closure that evokes Providence's control. Shakespeare, by contrast, sets in the foreground the restoration of the older, indeed aged, generation, in the reunion of Leontes and Hermione. Leontes not only lives, but seems to insist on the happy ending of the play.

It has been suggested that the use of a pastoral romance from the 1590s indicates that at the end of his career, Shakespeare felt a renewed interest in the dramatic contexts of his youth. Minor influences also suggest such an interest. As in Pericles, Prince of Tyre, he uses a chorus to advance the action in the manner of the naive dramatic tradition; the use of a bear in the scene on the Bohemian seashore is almost certainly indebted to Mucedorus, a chivalric romance revived at court around 1610.

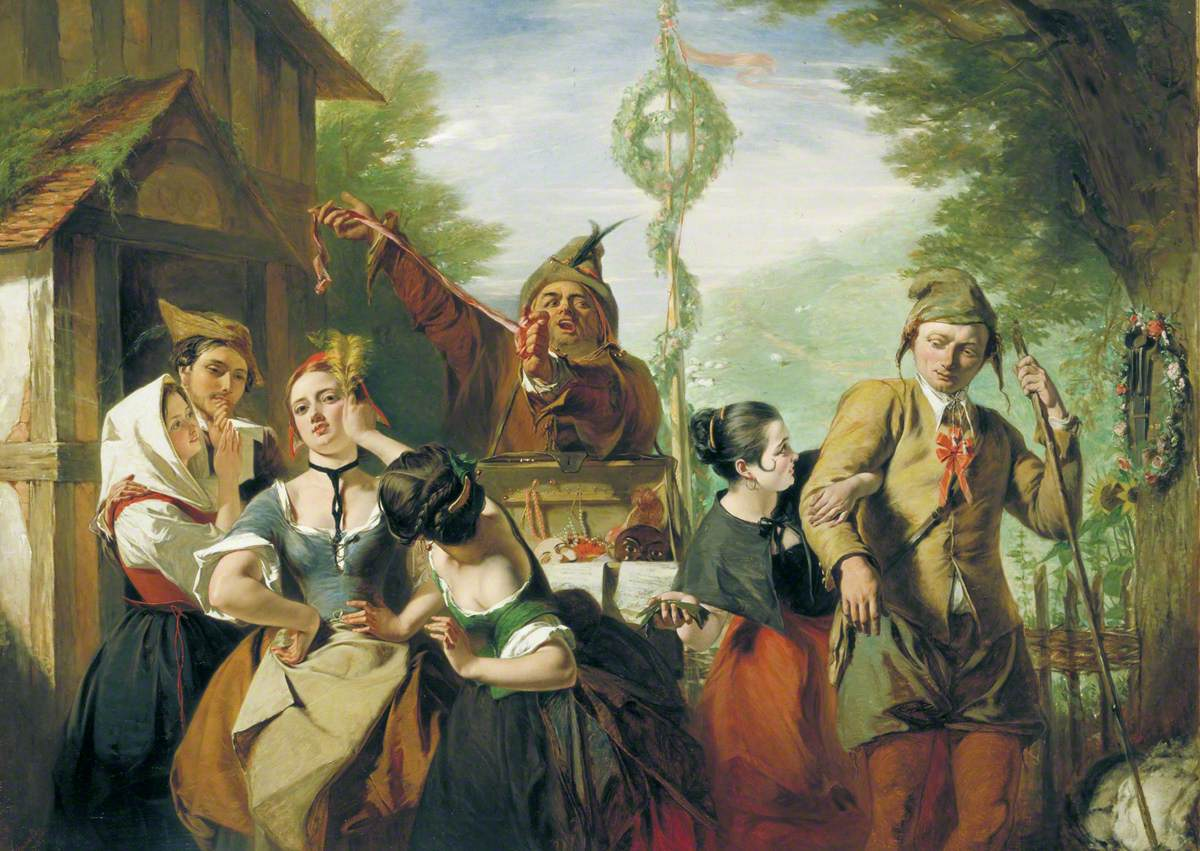
Scene from 'The Winter's Tale' (Act IV, Scene 4) (from the play by William Shakespeare), Augustus Leopold Egg (1845)

Eric Ives, the biographer of Anne Boleyn (1986), believes that the play is meant to parallel the fall of that queen, who was beheaded on false charges of adultery on the orders of her husband Henry VIII in 1536. There are numerous parallels between the two stories – including the fact that one of Henry's closest friends, Sir Henry Norreys, was beheaded as one of Anne's supposed lovers and refused to confess in order to save his life, claiming that everyone knew the Queen was innocent. If this theory is followed, then Perdita becomes a dramatic representation of Anne's only daughter, Queen Elizabeth I.

== Date and text ==
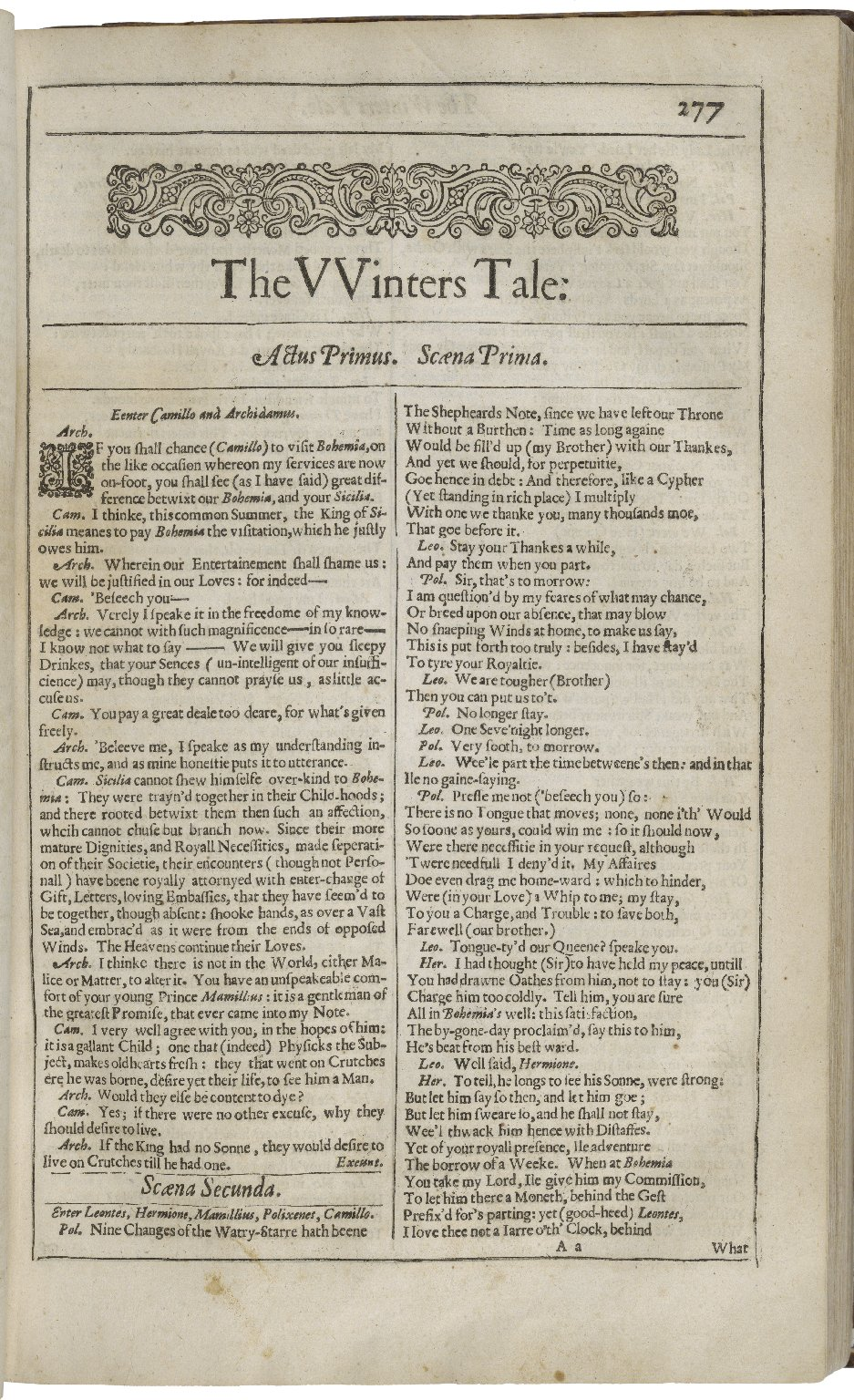
The first page of The VVinters Tale, printed in the Second Folio of 1632

The play was not published until the First Folio of 1623. In spite of tentative early datings (see below), most critics believe the play is one of Shakespeare's later works, possibly written in 1610 or 1611. A 1611 date is suggested by an apparent connection with Ben Jonson's Masque of Oberon, performed at Court 1 January 1611, in which appears a dance of ten or twelve satyrs; The Winter's Tale includes a dance of twelve men costumed as satyrs, and the servant announcing their entry says "one three of them, by their own report, sir, hath danc'd before the King." (IV.iv.337–338). Arden Shakespeare editor J.H.P. Pafford found that "the language, style, and spirit of the play all point to a late date. The tangled speech, the packed sentences, speeches which begin and end in the middle of a line, and the high percentage of light and weak endings are all marks of Shakespeare's writing at the end of his career. But of more importance than a verse test is the similarity of the last plays in spirit and themes."

In the late 18th century, Edmond Malone suggested that a "book" listed in the Stationers' Register on 22 May 1594, under the title "a Wynters nightes pastime", might have been Shakespeare's, though no copy of it is known. In 1933, Dr. Samuel A. Tannenbaum wrote that Malone subsequently "seems to have assigned it to 1604; later still, to 1613; and finally he settled on 1610–11. Hunter assigned it to about 1605."

== Analysis and criticism ==
=== Title of the play ===
A play called "The Winter's Tale" would immediately indicate to contemporary audiences that the work would present an "idle tale", an old wives' tale not intended to be realistic, and that it would offer the promise of a happy ending. The title may have been inspired by George Peele's play The Old Wives' Tale of 1590, in which a storyteller tells "a merry winter's tale" of a missing daughter. Early in The Winter's Tale, the royal heir, Mamillius, warns that "a sad tale's best for winter". His mother is soon put on trial for treason and adultery – and his death is announced seconds after she is shown to have been faithful and Leontes's accusations unfounded.

=== Debates ===
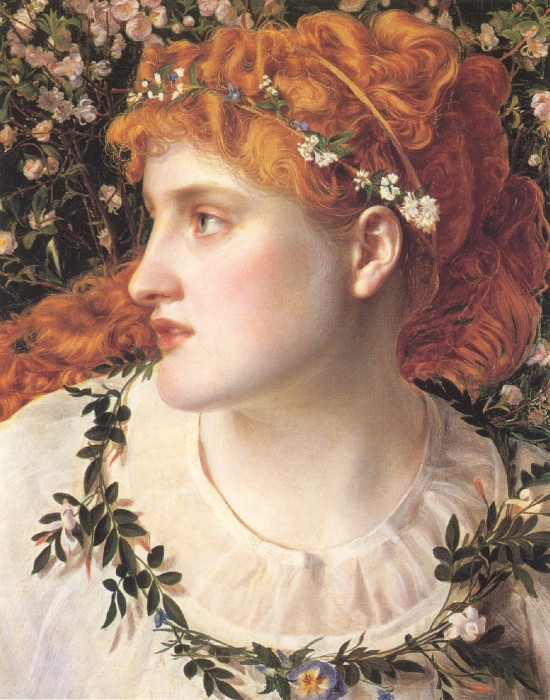
Perdita by Anthony Frederick Augustus Sandys

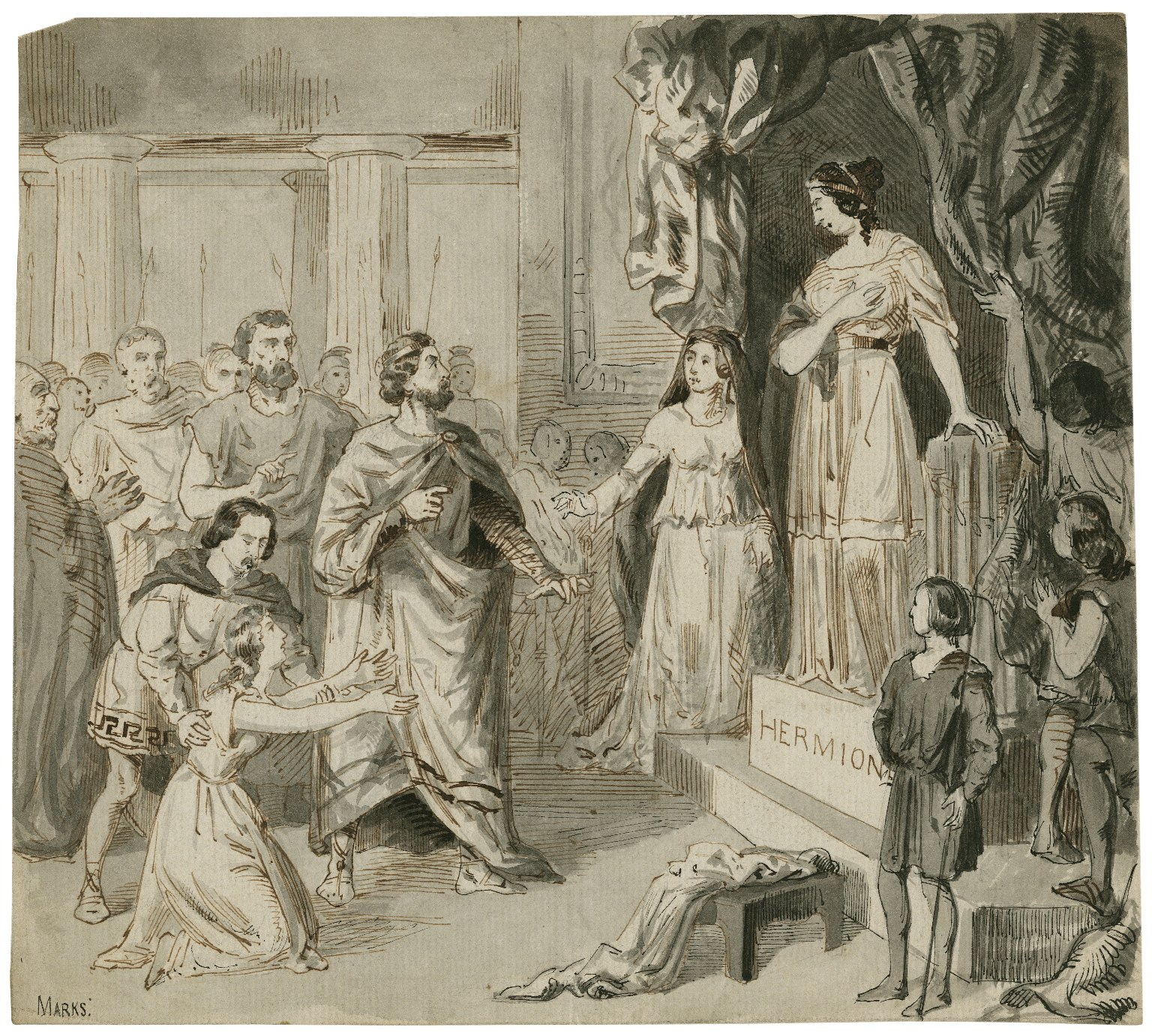
A mid-19th-century painting of the statue of Hermione coming to life

==== The statue ====
While the language Paulina uses in the final scene evokes the sense of a magical ritual through which Hermione is brought back to life, there are several passages which suggest a far likelier case – that Hermione simply fainted, rather than died, at her trial in Act III, and that Paulina hid her at a remote location to protect her from Leontes' wrath and that the re-animation of Hermione does not derive from any magic. The Steward announces that the members of the court have gone to Paulina's dwelling to see the statue; Rogero offers this exposition: "I thought she had some great matter there in hand, for she [Paulina] hath privately twice or thrice a day, ever since the death of Hermione, visited that removed house" (5.2. 102–105). Further, Leontes is surprised that the statue is "so much wrinkled", unlike the Hermione he remembers. Paulina answers his concern by claiming that the age-progression attests to the "carver's excellence", which makes her look "as [if] she lived now". Hermione later asserts that her desire to see her daughter allowed her to endure 16 years of separation: "thou shalt hear that I, / Knowing by Paulina that the oracle / Gave hope thou wast in being, have preserved / Myself to see the issue" (5.3.126–129).

However, the action of 3.2 calls into question the "rational" explanation that Hermione was spirited away and sequestered for 16 years. Hermione swoons upon the news of Mamillius' death, and is rushed from the room. Paulina returns after a short monologue from Leontes, bearing the news of Hermione's death. After some discussion, Leontes demands to be led toward the bodies of his wife and son: "Prithee, bring me / To the dead bodies of my queen and son: / One grave shall be for both: upon them shall / The causes of their death appear, unto / Our shame perpetual" (3.2). Paulina seems convinced of Hermione's death, and Leontes' order to visit both bodies and see them interred is never called into question by later events in the play.

==== The seacoast of Bohemia ====
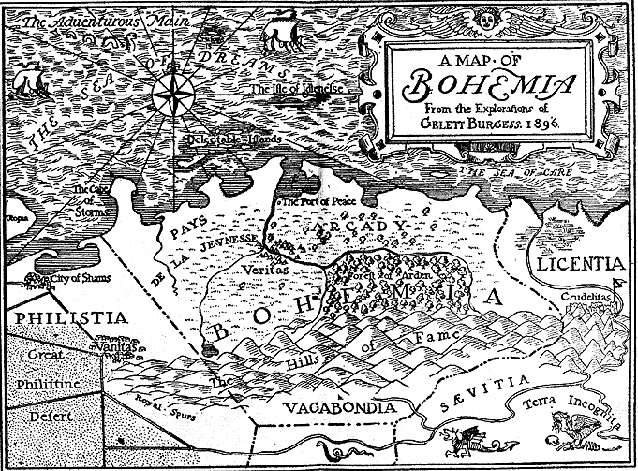
A fanciful 1896 map by Gelett Burgess showing Bohemia's seacoast

Shakespeare's fellow playwright Ben Jonson ridiculed the presence in the play of a seacoast and a desert in Bohemia, since the landlocked Kingdom of Bohemia (corresponding to the western part of the modern-day Czech Republic) had neither a coast nor a desert. Shakespeare followed his source (Robert Greene's Pandosto) in giving Bohemia a coast, though he reversed the location of characters and events: "The part of Pandosto of Bohemia is taken by Leontes of Sicily, that of Egistus of Sicily by Polixenes of Bohemia". In support of Greene and Shakespeare, it has been pointed out that for a brief period in the 13th century, the territories ruled by Ottokar II of Bohemia did stretch to the Adriatic, even though Bohemia strictly speaking did not; so that if one takes "Bohemia" to mean all of the territories ruled by Ottokar II, it would have been possible to sail from Sicily to the "seacoast of Bohemia". Jonathan Bate offers the simple explanation that the court of King James was politically allied with that of Rudolf II, and the characters and dramatic roles of the rulers of Sicily and Bohemia were reversed for reasons of political sensitivity, and in particular to allow it to be performed at the wedding of the Princess Elizabeth.

In 1891, Edmund Oscar von Lippmann pointed out that "Bohemia" was also a rare name for Apulia in southern Italy. More influential was Thomas Hanmer's 1744 argument that Bohemia is a printed error for Bithynia, an ancient nation in Asia Minor; this theory was adopted in Charles Kean's influential 19th-century production of the play, which featured a resplendent Bithynian court. At the time of the medieval Kingdom of Sicily, however, Bithynia was long extinct and its territories were controlled by the Byzantine Empire. On the other hand, the play alludes to Hellenistic antiquity (e.g. the Oracle of Delphos, the names of the kings), so that the "Kingdom of Sicily" may refer to Greek Sicily, not to the Kingdom of Sicily of later medieval times. This is irreconcilably contradicted by Hermione's identity as a princess of Russia, a country that did not exist in the classical period.

The pastoral genre is not known for precise verisimilitude, and, like the assortment of mixed references to ancient religion and contemporary religious figures and customs, this possible inaccuracy may have been included to underscore the play's fantastical and chimeric quality. As Andrew Gurr puts it, Bohemia may have been given a seacoast "to flout geographical realism, and to underline the unreality of place in the play". Gurr adds that, at the same time, Shakespeare may have been deliberately setting a trap for his friend the pedantic Ben Jonson (see above), who insisted plays must adhere to classical realism. Jonson duly denounced the inaccuracy, falling into the trap.

A theory explaining the existence of the seacoast in Bohemia offered by C. H. Herford is suggested in Shakespeare's chosen title of the play. A winter's tale is something associated with parents telling children stories of legends around a fireside: by using this title, it implies to the audience that these details should not be taken too seriously.

John A. Pitcher argues in the Arden Shakespeare Third Series edition (2010) that the coast of Bohemia is intended as a joke, akin to jokes about a "Swiss Navy".

In the novel Prince Otto by Robert Louis Stevenson reference is made to the land of Seaboard Bohemia in the context of an obvious parody of Shakespeare's apparent liberties with geography in the play.

==== The Isle of Delphos ====
Likewise, Shakespeare's apparent mistake of placing the Oracle of Delphi on a small island has been used as evidence of Shakespeare's limited education. However, Shakespeare again copied this locale directly from Pandosto. Moreover, the erudite Robert Greene was not in error, as the Isle of Delphos does not refer to Delphi, but to the Cycladic island of Delos, the mythical birthplace of Apollo, which from the 15th to the late 17th century in England was confused with "Delphos". Greene's source for an Apollonian oracle on this island likely was the Aeneid, in which Virgil wrote that Priam consulted the Oracle of Delos before the outbreak of the Trojan War and that Aeneas after escaping from Troy consulted the same Delian oracle regarding his future.

==== The bear ====
The play contains the most famous of Shakespearean stage directions: Exit, pursued by a bear, presaging the offstage death of Antigonus. It has been theorized that early productions used a living bear, although this is rejected by contemporary scholarship. Bears are unreliable and difficult to train, and there is no historical evidence of live bears ever having been used in Elizabethan era theater.

== Performance history ==
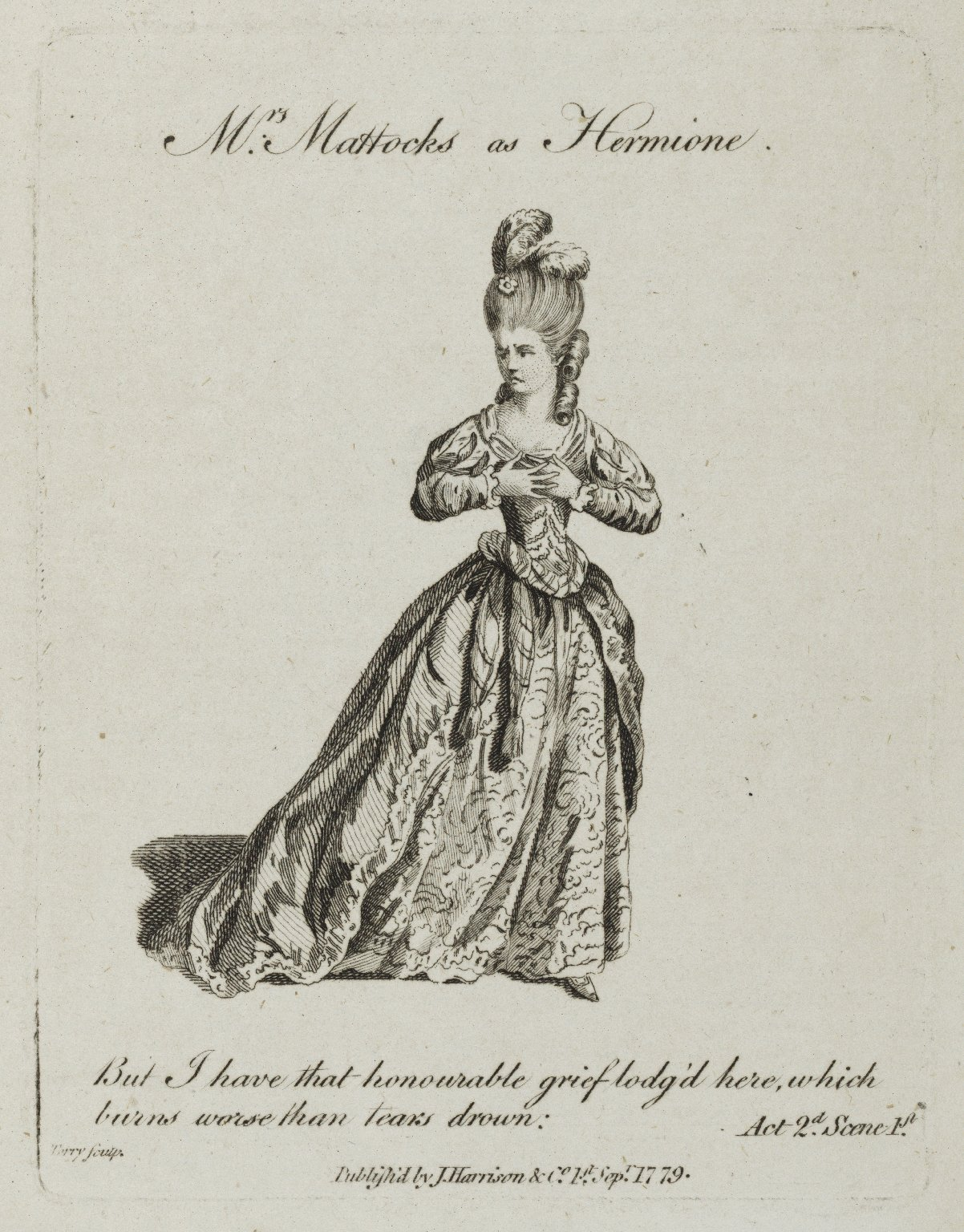
A depiction of Mrs. Mattocks as Hermione, from a 1779 performance at the Theatre Royal in Drury Lane

=== Shakespeare's day to the Restoration ===
The earliest recorded performance of the play was reported by Simon Forman, the Elizabethan "figure caster" or astrologer, who noted in his journal on 11 May 1611 that he saw The Winter's Tale at the Globe playhouse. The play was then performed in front of King James at Court on 5 November 1611. The play was also acted at Whitehall during the festivities preceding Princess Elizabeth's marriage to Elector Frederick V of the Palatinate on 14 February 1613. Later Court performances occurred on 7 April 1618, 18 January 1623 and 16 January 1634. It was not revived during the Restoration, unlike many other Shakespearean plays.

=== 18th and 19th century ===
The Winter's Tale was performed in 1741 at Goodman's Fields Theatre and in 1742 at Covent Garden. Adaptations, titled The Sheep-Shearing and Florizal and Perdita, were acted at Covent Garden in 1754 and at Drury Lane in 1756. Notable stagings in the 19th century included those featuring John Philip Kemble in 1811, Samuel Phelps in 1845 and Charles Kean in an 1856 production that was famous for its elaborate sets and costumes. Johnston Forbes-Robertson played Leontes memorably in 1887.

=== 20th century ===
Herbert Beerbohm Tree took on the role of Leontes in 1906. The longest-running Broadway production starred Henry Daniell and Jessie Royce Landis and ran for 39 performances in 1946. One of the best remembered modern productions was staged by Peter Brook in London in 1951 and starred John Gielgud as Leontes. In the Guthrie Theater's 1976-1977 season, Michael Langham directed a Minneapolis production with Ken Ruta as Leontes and Helen Carey as Hermione; also featuring Barbara Bryne, Tony Mockus, Mark Lamos and Oliver Cliff. In 1980, David Jones, a former associate artistic director of the Royal Shakespeare Company, chose to launch his new theatre company at the Brooklyn Academy of Music (BAM) with The Winter's Tale starring Brian Murray supported by Jones' new company at BAM In 1983, the Riverside Shakespeare Company mounted a production based on the First Folio text at The Shakespeare Center in Manhattan. In 1993 Adrian Noble won a Globe Award for Best Director for his Royal Shakespeare Company adaptation, which then was successfully brought to the Brooklyn Academy of Music in 1994. In 1997, a production at Boise State University was directed by Gordon Reinhart and starred Ira Amyx, James B. Fisk, Richard Klautsch and Randy Davison as Polixenes.

=== 21st century ===
In 2009, four separate productions were staged. Sam Mendes inaugurated his transatlantic "Bridge Project" directing The Winter's Tale with a cast featuring Simon Russell Beale (Leontes), Rebecca Hall (Hermione), Ethan Hawke (Autolycus), Sinéad Cusack (Paulina), and Morven Christie (Perdita). The Royal Shakespeare Company mounted the show. Theatre Delicatessen also staged productions of The Winter's Tale in 2009. The play is in the repertory of the Stratford Festival of Canada and was seen at the New York Shakespeare Festival, Central Park, in 2010. Last, the Hudson Shakespeare Company of New Jersey presented a production as part of their annual Shakespeare in the Parks series, set in central Europe during the early 1900s era of the Austro-Hungarian Empire but with a decidedly diverse cast. African American actors Tony White played Leontes, Deirdre Ann Johnson played Hermione, and Monica Jones in a dual role of Mamillius and Perdita. Angela Liao appeared as Paulina.

In 2013, the RSC staged a new production directed by Lucy Bailey, starring Jo Stone-Fewings as Leontes and Tara Fitzgerald as Hermione. This production premiered at the Royal Shakespeare Theatre on 24 January 2013.

In 2015, the Kenneth Branagh Production company staged the play at the Garrick Theatre, with simultaneous broadcast to cinemas. The production featured Kenneth Branagh as Leontes, Judi Dench as Paulina, and Miranda Raison as Hermione. The same year, Cheek by Jowl staged the play, directed by Declan Donnellan and designed by Nick Ormerod. The production toured globally, including to France, Spain, the US and Russia, and was livestreamed around the world in a partnership with the BBC and Riverside Studios.

In 2017, The Public Theater Mobile Unit staged the play, directed by Lee Sunday Evans. In 2018, Theatre for a New Audience staged the play Off-Broadway, directed by Arin Arbus with Kelley Curran as Hermione and Anatol Yusef as Leontes.

In 2018, the play was also performed at Shakespeare's Globe, in London. The Globe staged it again in 2023, in a production where the audience walked between the Sam Wanamaker Playhouse (where the Sicilian scenes were staged) and the main Globe Theatre (where the Bohemian scenes were staged).

Also in 2023, Empty Space Productions and The University of New England staged a production in Armidale, Australia. The Folger Theatre in Washington, DC staged a production directed by Tamilla Wodard that fall as the first play shown in the Theatre after its multi-year, multimillion-dollar renovation. l

The play was part of the 2025 season of the Stratford Festival.

In 2026, the play was part of the annual Free Shakespeare in the Park event hosted by The Public Theater in New York, NY. That same year, the play is part of a repertory project alongside A Midsummer Night's Dream at the Chicago Shakespeare Theater in Chicago, IL, in observance of its 40th anniversary.

== Adaptations ==
There have been numerous film versions, including a 1910 silent film, a 1961 television film starring Robert Shaw, and a 1967 version starring Laurence Harvey as Leontes. An "orthodox" BBC production was televised in 1981. It was produced by Jonathan Miller, directed by Jane Howell and starred Robert Stephens as Polixenes and Jeremy Kemp as Leontes. French director Eric Rohmer references the play during a sequence in his 1992 film, A Tale of Winter, in which the characters attend a performance.

Choreographer Christopher Wheeldon created a full-length ballet, with music by Joby Talbot, based on the play. The ballet is a co-production between The Royal Ballet and National Ballet of Canada, and premiered in Royal Opera House in London in 2014.

In 2015, author Jeanette Winterson published the book The Gap of Time, a modern adaptation of The Winter's Tale. In 2016, author E. K. Johnston published Exit, Pursued by a Bear, another modern adaption.

On 1 May 2016, BBC Radio 3's Drama on 3 broadcast an audio production directed by David Hunter, with Danny Sapani as Leontes, Eve Best as Hermione, Shaun Dooley as Polixenes, Karl Johnson as Camillo, Susan Jameson as Paulina, Paul Copley as the Shepherd and Faye Castelow as Perdita.

An opera by Ryan Wigglesworth, based on the play, was premiered at the English National Opera on 27 February 2017.

In 2021 Melbourne Shakespeare Company produced an abridged musical production directed by Jennifer Sarah Dean at Central Park in Melbourne.

== Sources ==
- Brooke, C. F. Tucker. 1908. The Shakespeare Apocrypha, Oxford, Clarendon press, 1908; pp. 103–126.
- Chaney, Edward, The Evolution of the Grand Tour: Anglo-Italian Cultural Relations since the Renaissance 2nd ed.(Routledge, 2000).
- Gurr, Andrew. 1983. "The Bear, the Statue, and Hysteria in The Winter's Tale", Shakespeare Quarterly 34 (1983), p. 422.
- Halliday, F. E. 1964. A Shakespeare Companion 1564–1964, Baltimore, Penguin, 1964; p. 532.
- Hanmer, Thomas. 1743. The Works of Shakespeare (Oxford, 1743–44), vol. 2.
- Isenberg, Seymour. 1983. "Sunny Winter", The New York Shakespeare Society Bulletin, (Dr. Bernard Beckerman, chairman; Columbia University) March 1983, pp. 25–26.
- Jonson, Ben. "Conversations with Drummond of Hawthornden", in Herford and Simpson, ed. Ben Jonson, vol. 1, p. 139.
- Kalem, T. E. 1980. "Brooklyn Bets on Rep", Time Magazine, 3 March 1980.
- Lawrence, William W. 1931. Shakespeare's Problem Comedies, Macmillan, New York. OCLC 459490669
- Von Lippmann, Edmund O. 1891. "Shakespeare's Ignorance?", New Review 4 (1891), 250–254.
- McDowell, W. Stuart. 1983. Director's note in the program for the Riverside Shakespeare Company production of The Winter's Tale, New York City, 25 February 1983.
- Pafford, John Henry Pyle. 1962, ed. The Winter's Tale, Arden Edition, 1962, p. 66.
- Tannenbaum, Dr. Samuel A. 1933. " Shakespearean Scraps", chapter: "The Forman Notes" (1933).
- Verzella, Massimo, "Iconografia femminile in The Winter's Tale", Merope, XII, 31 (sett chism and anti-Petrarchism in The Winter's Tale" in Merope, numero speciale dedicato agli Studi di Shakespeare in Italia, a cura di Michael Hattaway e Clara Mucci, XVII, 46–47 (Set. 2005– Gen. 2006), pp. 161–179.
