= Adrian Beaumont =

British composer, conductor and university teacher

Adrian Beaumont (born 1937, Huddersfield) is a British composer, conductor and university teacher.

He studied at University College, Cardiff, completing a PhD in composition in 1972. He lectured in music at the University of Bristol from 1961 until his retirement in 2002, his 41 years continuous service making him the longest-serving academic in the university's history. In 1994 he was appointed to the post of Reader in Composition.

Works include Summer Ecstasies for soprano and orchestra, three Symphonies, an oratorio (Now Burns the Bright Redeeming Fire), a concerto for oboe and strings, Mazemaker Fantasy for instrumental ensemble, and Nature Studies for oboe and piano.

As a conductor, he has worked with Bristol Opera, the Bristol Bach Choir (1967–78), and the Symphony Orchestra, Choral Society and New Music Ensemble at the University of Bristol. He was also for many years a professional oboist.

His students at Bristol included the British composers Michael Edwards, Alan Charlton, Owen Leech and Ian Stephens, and the conductor Christopher Austin. As well as teaching composition, he was noted as a specialist in 19th and 20th century musicology and in orchestration.

He continues to live in Bristol and is married to the soprano Janet Price, for whom many of his works were written and dedicated.

== Publications ==
- Beaumont, Adrian: Expectation and Interpretation in the Reception of New Music: A Case Study in Thomas, W. (ed.), Composition - Performance - Reception: Studies in the Creative Process in Music, Ashgate, 1998, ISBN 1-85928-325-X
