= George Hale (minister) =

George Ernest Hale (July 1884 – September 1966), early in his career referred to as G. Ernest Hale, was a Unitarian minister in South Australia.

== History ==
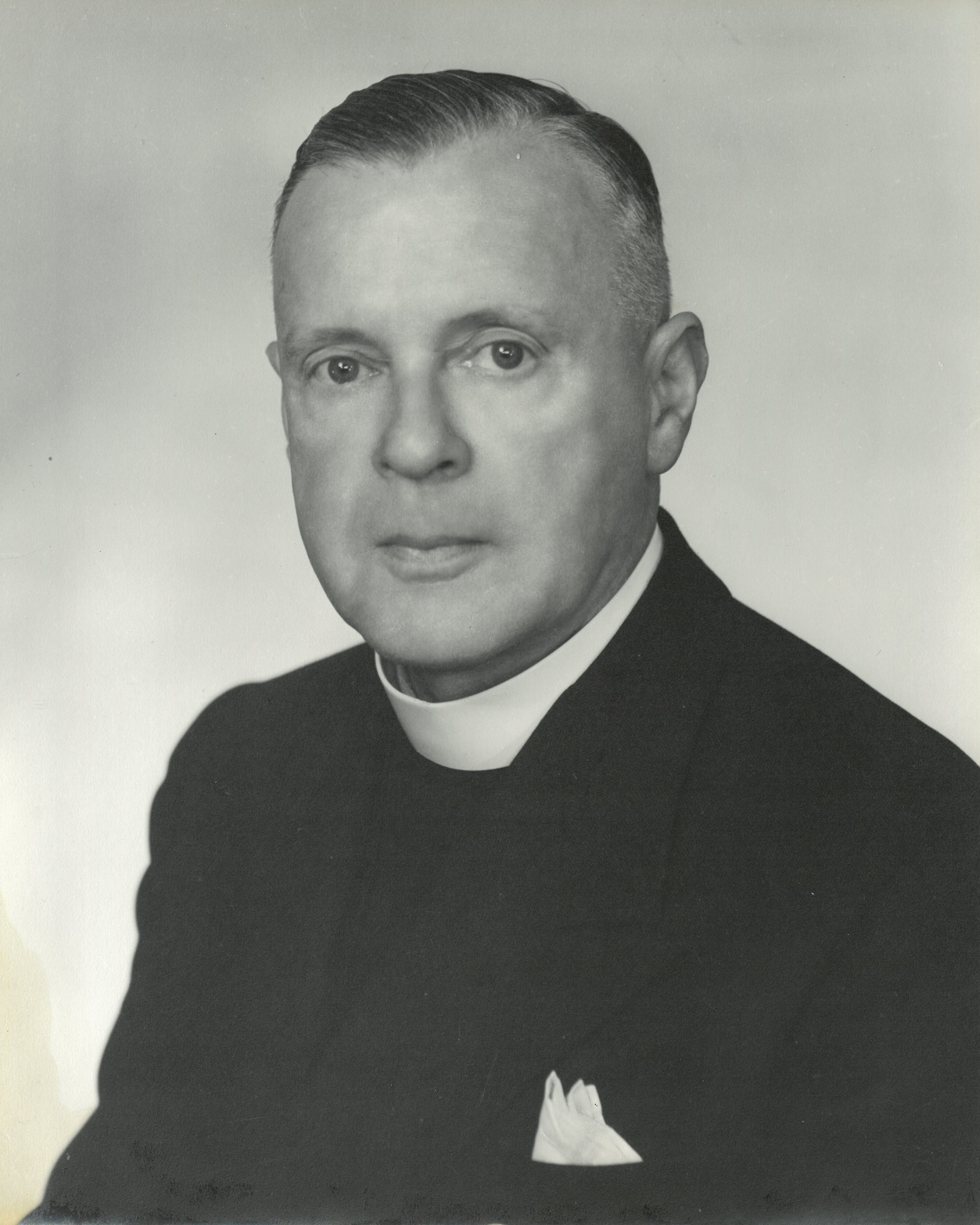
George Hale c. 1940

Hale was born in Geelong, Victoria, a son of William Henry Hale and Martha Jane Hale

He was a student at the Baptist College, Melbourne, 1905–1906, and graduated BA from the University of Melbourne, after a career described as brilliant, and served as minister of the Baptist Church at Murrumbeena, Victoria 1910–1914. He was invited to serve as temporary minister of the Unitarian Free Church at Wellington, New Zealand in 1914, and remained there for six years, then accepted a call to the Unitarian Christian Church, Wakefield Street, Adelaide to succeed the Rev. Wyndham Heathcote. Hale preached his sermons at the Adelaide church at 11 am and 7 pm on or before 20 February 1921. He conducted his last service in Adelaide on 30 December 1945.

Hale was noted for his sermons: thoughtful, original, well-prepared and delivered without notes of any kind. He was praised for his oratorical skills: clear perfect diction and a pleasant voice, slow and deliberate (an asset in such a large space with no acoustic treatment) and rising in pitch for emphasis. His sermons would have been taxing for the uneducated but deeply satisfying for the academically inclined, as he assumed some knowledge of History, Mythology, Psychology and Classical languages from his audience, but withal punctuated by a lively sense of humour. The subjects of his Sunday sermons were always clearly defined and often topical, and posted on a large notice board in front of the church early in the week.

He conducted separate services for the Tranmere Unitarian Congregation in the years 1930–1940, meeting at the Masonic Hall, Magill.

Pacifism was not a tenet of Unitarianism, and many men from the Wakefield Street church were posted overseas, more than a few losing their lives in the two world wars. Hale, however, opposed participation in the war of 1938–1945. His sermon of Sunday evening 8 October 1939 This or Any Other War: Where I Stand and Why must have ruffled a few feathers:

[. . . closing paragraphs:] This then is where I stand and why. I know how fateful is my decision. It is quite possible that by some I shall be judged a fool, by others a knave. I may fall very far short of my ideal, but at least I shall try. I shall seek to love everybody and remember that a man in uniform may be as true to his light as I am to mine. Nevertheless on I must go.
If any listening to me are disposed to make a similar stand, let them pause and consider the cost. I think it will be very high. The deliberate downright pacifists will, along with the soldier, have much to suffer, but he will be sustained with the thought that, as God lives and the way of Christ is the way where the light dwelleth, his witness is grandly worth while

Long after he retired, Hale would on occasion return to the Wakefield Street pulpit.

His 25 years' service to the Adelaide church was only exceeded by that of John Crawford Woods.

== Other activities ==
- He gave public speaking classes at the Workers' Educational Association from 1923 and gave regular Saturday afternoon talks on Adelaide radio 5CL from 1928 to around 1938. The subject of his talks could be education, personal development, literature, folklore, history, psychology and topics of the day, in all of which he had an abiding interest. The works of Dickens was a popular topic. Despite (or because of) his avoidance of religiosity, he attracted a great number of visitors, particularly young adults, to the church, which was sometimes full to overflowing.
- He served as Chairman of the All Nations' Chum Movement executive.
- He ran a well-attended Bible class, which was held at 4.30 every Sunday afternoon, at which a member would present a paper, whose contents formed the basis of subsequent discussion.
- He founded the Optimists' Group as a social club, reading plays, planning events and general discussion, and also helping the church in small ways: fundraising and property maintenance. Each year they hosted a banquet for Church Members.
- He founded an Expression Class which produced dramatic performances (and with the incumbency of his successor Rev. Colin Gibson became the Unity Players?), and a Literary Society to consider and enjoy poetry and literature. This group was a member of the Literary Societies' Union. Again, these activities mostly attracted young adults.
- He adjudicated at elocution competitions, assisted with the YMCA's Literary Society, and helped the Repertory Theatre with voice production, on occasion taking to the podium.

== Family ==
George Hale married Florence Elizabeth Picken daughter of William Thomas Picken. Their children included:

- Ivan Hale ( –1991)
- Channing Hale ( – )
- Una Rosalind Hale (18 November 1922 – 4 March 2005) married Martin Carr in 1960. She was a noted opera singer, guest artist at the 1962 Festival of Arts. While in Adelaide, without any public notice, she performed solo and sang with the church choir.

During his ministry they lived in the Unitarian manse (purchased around 1921) at 7 Trevelyan Street, Wayville and, on his return to Adelaide, at 33 Rochester Street, Leabrook.

Hale had sister and a brother:

- Nellie Hale (6 October ?? – 6 October 1919) married Jack Welsh; they lived in Wonthaggi, then "Leith", Dorrington Road, East Malvern, Victoria, where she died.
- Charles H. Hale, lived in Prahran, Victoria, and at Wonthaggi.
