= Walter Hagen-Groll =

- Hagen-Groll, in the 1970s
- Born: 15 April 1927; Chemnitz, Saxony, Germany
- Died: 3 October 2018 (aged 91); Salzburg, Austria
- Education: Musikhochschule Stuttgart
- Occupations: Choral conductor; Academic teacher
- Organizations: Deutsche Oper Berlin; Salzburg Festival; Mozarteum

Walter Hagen-Groll (15 April 1927 – 3 November 2018) was a German choral conductor, conductor and pianist. He was known as chorus director for decades at the Deutsche Oper Berlin and the Salzburg Festival. He was professor at the Mozarteum in Salzburg.

== Life and career ==
Walter Hagen-Groll was born in Chemnitz on 15 April 1927, the son of Alfred Hagen-Groll, an apothecary, and his wife Margarete née Wenzel. During his schooling, he took lessons in piano and organ from Eugen Richter from 1934 to 1944, achieving an Organistenzeugnis of the Protestant church in Saxony. After the Abitur, he studied piano with Josef Pembaur in Munich, interrupted by military service and being held as a prisoner of war. He studied further at the Musikhochschule Stuttgart from 1947 to 1952, piano with Jürgen Uhde and Hubert Giesen, conducting with Koslik and Walter Aign for conducting, and musicology with Hermann Erpf; he graduated with a diploma as music teacher and conductor.

Hagen-Groll worked from 1952 to 1957 as répétiteur and deputy choral director at the Stuttgart State Opera, and then to 1961 as choral conductor and kapellmeister at the Theater Heidelberg. He assisted Wilhelm Pitz at the Bayreuth Festival from 1960 to 1962.

Hagen-Groll was director of the chorus of the Deutsche Oper Berlin from 1961 to 1984. He had the ambition to form the largest opera chorus of Europe, of 120 singers, also the best, and achieved it over many years, as Die Welt acknowledged. In 1962 he became choral conductor at the Salzburg Festival, and chorus director there from 1965 to 1988. He collaborated with conductors such as Herbert von Karajan, Karl Böhm and Giuseppe Sinopoli, also for recordings.

He was artistic director of the New Philharmonia Chorus in London from 1971 to 1975. He was chorus director at the Vienna State Opera from 1984 to 1986 and from then on with a guest contract. In the 1987/88 season, he also directed the Wiener Singakademie

Hagen-Groll headed the class of choral conducting at the Mozarteum in Salzburg from 1986. He was recognised as an influential trainer of singers and students.

=== Personal life ===
Hagen-Groll was married to Renate née Offenhäußer.

Hagen-Groll died in Salzburg on 3 November 2018, at the age of 91.

== Awards ==
- 1966 Deutscher Kritikerpreis
- 1976 Grammy nomination
- 1981 Verdienstzeichen of Salzburg
- 1984 Officer's Cross of the Order of Merit of the Federal Republic of Germany
- 1987 Clemens Krauss Medal of the Konzertvereinigung Wiener Staatsopernchor
- 2001 Honorary member of the Deutsche Oper Berlin
- 2003 Honorary member of the Salzburger Gesellschaft für zeitgenössische Musik

== Recording ==
Hagen-Groll was involved in almost 80 recordings, collaborating with conductors such as Claudio Abbado, Christoph von Dohnányi, Nikolaus Harnoncourt, Eugen Jochum, Lorin Maazel, Riccardo Muti, Giuseppe Sinopoli and Robert Stolz, including:

- Wagner's Götterdämmerung, Karajan, Deutsche Grammophon 1970 OCLC 947202638
- Wagner's Tristan und Isolde, Karajan, Angel Records 1972 OCLC 1184434078
- Haydn's The Seasons, Karajan, 1974 OCLC 838331316
- Verdi's Otello, Karajan, Angel Records 1974 OCLC 830674458
- Beethoven's Missa solemnis, Giulini, EMI 1977 OCLC 931754169
- Verdi's Il trovatore, Karajan, EMI 1978 OCLC 962731535
- Verdi's Nabucco, Sinopoli, Deutsche Grammophon 1983 OCLC 248534176
- Mozart's Great Mass in C minor, Harnoncourt, Teldec 1985 OCLC 935151751
- Beethoven's Ninth Symphony, Abbado, Deutsche Grammophon 1987 OCLC 1183774715
- Mozart's Così fan tutte, Muti, EMI 1997 OCLC 313094914

Two recordings earned a nomination for a Grammy Award.
