= Bristol Bach Choir =

Bristol Bach Choir is an auditioned amateur choir based in Bristol, England.

== Conductors ==
- Adrian Beaumont 1967–1978
- Alistair Jones 1978–1982
- Glyn Jenkins 1982–1999
- Peter Leech 1999–2008
- Gavin Carr 2009–2011
- Christopher Finch 2012

== History ==
The choir was founded in 1967 by University of Bristol colleagues Alan Farnill and Adrian Beaumont.

They have performed concerts at St George's Church, St Mary Redcliffe and the Victoria Rooms.
