= Norbert Balatsch =

Austrian conductor (1928–2020)

- Born: 10 March 1928; Vienna, First Austrian Republic
- Died: 6 May 2020 (aged 92); Vienna, Austria
- Education: Wiener Sängerknaben
- Occupations: Choral conductor
- Organizations: Vienna State Opera; Bayreuth Festival; Coro dell'Accademia Nazionale di Santa Cecilia
- Awards: Grammy Awards; Order of Merit of the Italian Republic

Norbert Balatsch (German: [ˈnɔʁbɛʁt ˈbala:tʃ]; 10 March 1928 – 6 May 2020) was an Austrian conductor, especially known as a choral conductor, who began as a baritone choir singer. He was the long-term choir director of both the Vienna State Opera and the Bayreuth Festival. Two of his recordings won Grammy Awards.

== Life ==
Born in Vienna on 10 March 1928, he was a member of the Wiener Sängerknaben boys' choir from 1938 to 1944. From 1952, Balatsch was a baritone in the opera chorus of the Vienna State Opera. A year later, he also became the conductor of a Vienna men's chorus, the Wiener Männergesang-Verein. At the State Opera, he eventually became the long-term choral conductor at the house, first leading the Extrachor from 1965, then as vice choral conductor in 1967, and in 1968 as Chordirektor (chorus director), a position he held until 1983.

From 1975 to 1980, he also directed the New Philharmonia Chorus, which had previously been, and from 1977 was again known as, the Philharmonia Chorus. He was the chorus director of the Bayreuth Festival from 1972 to 1999, collaborating with conductors including Karl Böhm, Dennis Russell Davies, Eugen Jochum, Carlos Kleiber, James Levine, Peter Schneider, Giuseppe Sinopoli, Georg Solti, and Silvio Varviso. The Bayreuth performances were broadcast live and recorded. In 1972, he led the choir in Tannhäuser, directed by Götz Friedrich and conducted by Erich Leinsdorf alternating with Horst Stein, and in further years by Heinrich Hollreiser (1973 and 1974) and Colin Davis (1977 and 1978). From 1976, Balatsch prepared the choir for the Jahrhundertring there, staged by Patrice Chéreau and conducted by Pierre Boulez. His last production was in 1999 Der fliegende Holländer, conducted by Daniel Barenboim.

From 1983, Balatsch was the conductor of the Coro dell'Accademia Nazionale di Santa Cecilia. In concerts with Lorin Maazel, he prepared the chorus for Beethoven's Ninth Symphony and Fidelio, and Roméo et Juliette by Berlioz. From 1999 to 2001, Balatsch was the director of the Wiener Sängerknaben. Among others, he prepared the boys for a 2000 recording of Bach's St Matthew Passion conducted by Nikolaus Harnoncourt.

Balatsch rehearsed choruses for numerous recordings, two of which won Grammy Awards in the category Best Choral Performance: Mozart's Requiem in 1981 with Carlo Maria Giulini conducting the Philharmonia Orchestra & Chorus, and Bach's St Matthew Passion in 2001. In 2006, he returned to the Vienna State Opera for a production of Schoenberg's Moses und Aron. He was awarded an honorary membership of the house after the last performance of that production on 19 June 2006.

Balatsch died in Vienna on 6 May 2020 at age 92.

== Awards ==
Balatsch was awarded the Goldener Ehrenring (Ring of honour in gold) from Bayreuth. He received the Ehrenring from the Vienna State Opera. In 2008, he was awarded the great cross of the Order of Merit of the Italian Republic (Cavaliere di Gran Croce Ordine al Merito della Repubblica Italiana).
