= Sophie Bevan =

British soprano singer (born 1983)

Sophie Bevan MBE
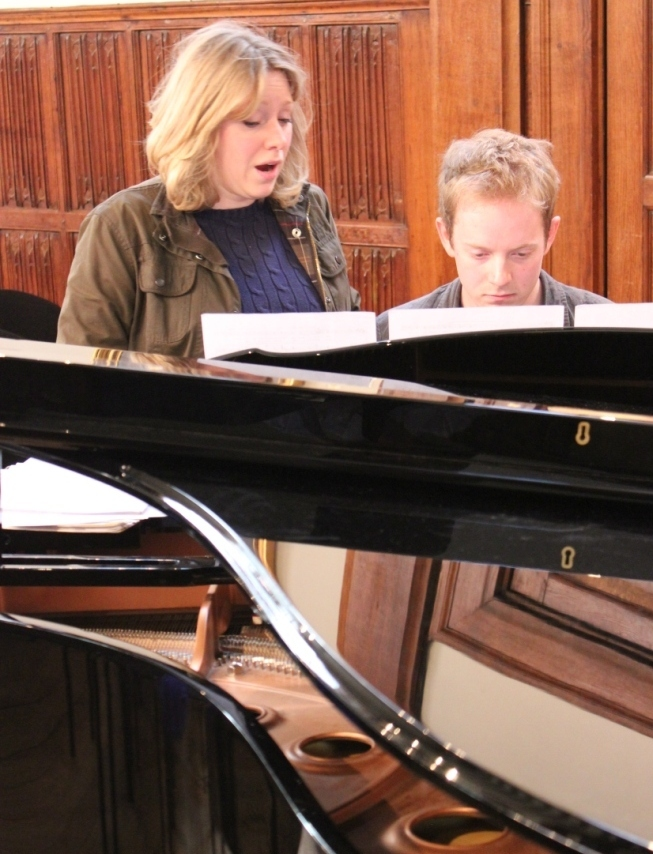
- Bevan rehearsing with Sebastian Wybrew, 2012
- Born: 1983 (age 42–43)
- Education: Benjamin Britten International Opera School
- Occupation: Soprano singer
- Years active: 2002 –
- Notable work: Opera, recitals, concerts, choirs
- Spouse: Ryan Wigglesworth
- Children: 3

Sophie Anna Magdalena Bevan MBE (born 1983) is a British lyric soprano appearing in concerts, recitals, and opera.

== Early life ==
Bevan was born in Somerset in 1983, the first-born of eight siblings. Her father was a singer and all of her siblings are musically gifted. Her father was one of 14 siblings; they formed a choir under the direction of her grandfather, the Bevan Family Choir, performing and making records.

In her childhood, her stepfather encouraged her in singing, which interested her more than playing piano, her first goal.

She graduated from the Benjamin Britten International Opera School, where she studied as a Karaviotis Scholar with Lillian Watson and was awarded the Queen Mother Rose Bowl for excelling in music.

== Career ==
Her concert repertoire ranges from Handel to James MacMillan and she has worked with conductors who include Sir Antonio Pappano, Edward Gardner, Laurence Cummings, Harry Bicket, Sir Neville Marriner, Philippe Herreweghe, Sir Mark Elder, Ryan Wigglesworth, Daniel Harding and Sir Charles Mackerras.

Bevan appeared as Sophie in Der Rosenkavalier for English National Opera; the title role in The Cunning Little Vixen for Welsh National Opera; Susana in Le Nozze di Figaro for Garsington Opera; Michal Saul for Glyndebourne Festival Opera; and Waldvogel in Siegfried, Pamina and Ilia for the Royal Opera House, Covent Garden.

Engagements include Susana and Antigone Oedipe at Covent Garden; concerts with the Sao Paulo State Symphony, CBSO, and recitals at the Wigmore Hall; Pamina for the Teatro Real, Madrid. Her debut at the Salzburg Festival as Beatrice in the world première of Thomas Adès' The Exterminating Angel met with good reviews. She sang that role in her debut at the Metropolitan Opera, New York.

Sophie is also the recipient of the 2010 Critics' Circle award for Exceptional Young Talent, The Times Breakthrough Award at the 2012 South Bank Sky Arts Awards and the Young Singer award at the 2013 inaugural International Opera Awards.

Bevan was appointed Member of the Order of the British Empire (MBE) in the 2019 Birthday Honours for services to music.

== Operatic repertoire ==
- Gluck: La clemenza di Tito (Publio)
- Handel: Riccardo I (Costanza)
- Monteverdi: L'Incoronazione di Poppea (Poppea/Amor)
- Mozart: Le nozze di Figaro (Susanna/Barbarina); Don Giovanni (Zerlina); Così fan tutte (Despina); Die Schuldigkeit des ersten Gebots (Worldly Spirit)
- Vivaldi: L'Incoronazione di Dario (Alinda)

== Personal life ==
Sophie Bevan is married to conductor and composer Ryan Wigglesworth. They have two children.

Bevan is cured of bowel cancer, which was diagnosed in 2022 after the birth of her second child. Her father died of the same cancer a few months before her diagnosis. She was not singing during the treatments and earlier with the birth of two children. She has resumed a full schedule of performances. She was expecting their third child in 2024.

She performed at the first night of BBC Proms at the Albert Hall in July 2024.

== Discography ==
- Perfido! (with Ian Page (conductor) and The Mozartists), Signum Records (2017)
- Max Reger: Songs (with Malcolm Martineau (Hyperion Records, CDA68057, 2016)
- Paul Carr: Requiem For An Angel (with Mark Stone - baritone, Chorus Angelorum, the Bath Philharmonia, Gavin Carr - conductor), Stone Records (2010)

Hail Windsor, Crown'd with lofty towers - with Café Mozart (Derek McCulloch), DanubiaDiscs CM003, 2005 Haydn & the Earl of Abingdon - with Café Mozart (Derek McCulloch), Naxos 8.570525, 2007 Begone dull care! Music from Jane Austen's library - with Box&Fir Co (Jenny Thomas), DanubiaDiscs DD006, 2009

== Other sources ==
- Christiansen, Rupert (19 October 2011). "Sophie Bevan: Soprano with the genes for greatness". The Telegraph.
- Feeney-Hart, Alison (21 December 2013). "Sophie Bevan's top 10 tips for becoming an opera star". BBC.
