= Wilhelm Pitz =

German chorus master and conductor

Pitz, left, with Hans Knappertsbusch, 1950s

Wilhelm Pitz (25 August 1897 – 21 November 1973) was a German chorus master and conductor. He re-established the Bayreuth Festival chorus for the postwar revival of the festival in 1951 and continued as its chorus master for twenty years. He was also chorus master of the Vienna State Opera, and in 1957 he selected and trained the singers of the newly created Philharmonia Chorus in London, remaining their chorus master until his retirement in 1971.

== Life and career ==
Wilhelm Pitz was born in Breinig in western Germany on 25 August 1897. He was a violinist in the Städtisches Orchester at Aachen from 1913, and in 1933 became chorus master of the Aachen State Opera – with Herbert von Karajan as musical director. He was also director of the municipal choir. In 1947 he was appointed first conductor at the opera, a post he held until 1960. On Karajan’s recommendation, he was appointed chorus master of the Bayreuth Festival for its postwar reopening in 1951. He undertook the selection and training of the choir, a task he continued to undertake at all the annual festivals until his retirement twenty years later.

In addition to his work at Bayreuth, Pitz was chorus master of the Vienna State Opera, and in 1957 at the request of the proprietor of the Philharmonia Orchestra, Walter Legge, he selected and trained the Philharmonia Chorus, which made its début under Otto Klemperer in Beethoven's Choral Symphony. At first Pitz reinforced the amateur choir with a few professional singers, particularly for recordings, but the reinforcements were soon found unnecessary. Pitz would fly in from his home in Aachen for Wednesday and Thursday evening rehearsals and fly back on the Friday. At rehearsals and recording sessions, seated behind a star conductor, he would often surreptitiously give signals to the chorus.

When the Philharmonia Orchestra and Chorus reformed themselves as self-governing bodies in 1964 Pitz remained the chorus master, and continued in that capacity until his retirement in 1971. In 1967 he marked his seventieth birthday by conducting the New Philharmonia Chorus and Orchestra in Beethoven's Missa solemnis at the Royal Festival Hall. He also conducted the chorus and orchestra in performances of Handel's Messiah.

With the Bayreuth Festival chorus and orchestra he recorded a set of choruses from Der fliegende Holländer, Götterdämmerung, Lohengrin, Die Meistersinger von Nürnberg, Parsifal and Tannhäuser, released on LP in 1960 and subsequently reissued on CD, but as Grove's Dictionary of Music and Musicians puts it, "his special fame arose from the quality of his choral preparation for the concerts and recordings of Klemperer, Giulini, and others, and for Bayreuth". His Bayreuth, Vienna and Philharmonia choruses feature on many recordings, singing under conductors including Sir John Barbirolli, Daniel Barenboim, Karl Böhm, Pierre Boulez, André Cluytens, Wilhelm Furtwängler, Carlo Maria Giulini, Herbert von Karajan, Rudolf Kempe, Hans Knappertsbusch, Wolfgang Sawallisch, Hans Schmidt-Isserstedt and Sir Georg Solti.

Pitz died in Aachen on 21 November 1973, aged 76.

== Honours and reputation ==
=== Honours ===
Pitz was made an honorary OBE in 1969 and held the Grosses Verdienstkreuz of the German Federal Republic. The Wilhelm Pitz Prize, inaugurated in his honour after his death, is presented to the most distinguished artists of the Bayreuth Festival by members of the festival chorus.

=== Reputation ===
In 1967 the music critics Edward Greenfield, Philip Hope-Wallace, William Mann and Alec Robertson collectively dubbed Pitz "prince among chorus masters". The Decca producer John Culshaw wrote of him:

Wilhelm Pitz, who was to prepare the Götterdämmerung chorus for us, is a charming man and to my mind the greatest chorus master in the world. To watch him at work is not only a lesson in choral training, but a study in psychology. An uninformed observer might be excused for thinking that Pitz was not earning his money, for he infrequently raises his voice and his manner is always subdued. But by the time he has finished with a chorus, one need have no doubt about the result. He knows how to reveal whatever good qualities any particular chorus has; and he knows how to minimize its weaknesses. He is a very great choral trainer.

When Sir William Walton heard Pitz rehearsing the chorus in Belshazzar's Feast he stood listening intently and on taking the podium he asked the chorus, "Why can't you do it like that for me?" In his memoirs in 1992 Daniel Barenboim wrote that he had learned a lot from Pitz, "a rare musician and a wonderful choral conductor", and praised his ability to achieve "a huge range of expression through very detailed differentiation between legato and marcato singing, and a combination of the two".

Pitz was celebrated not only in Germany and Britain but in France also. Pierre Sabatier wrote in Revue des Deux Mondes in 1954,"Les chœurs dirigés par Wilhelm Pitz sont d'une perfection qui ne saurait être dépassée; en particulier dans le Crépuscule des Dieux et dans Tannhäuser" ("The choirs directed by Wilhelm Pitz are of a perfection that cannot be surpassed; particularly in Götterdämmerung and Tannhäuser").

== Sources ==
- Barenboim, Daniel (1992). A Life in Music. New York: Scribner's. ISBN 0-68-419326-4.
- Boyden, John (1984). Stick to the Music: Scores of Orchestral Tales. London: Hutchinson. ISBN 0-09-158800-6.
- Culshaw, John (1967). Ring Resounding. London: Secker & Warburg. ISBN 978-0-436-11800-5.
- Hotter, Hans (2006). Memoirs. Boston: University Press of New England. ISBN 978-1-55553-661-9.
- March, Ivan, ed. (1967). The Great Records. Blackpool: Long Playing Record Library. OCLC 555041974.
- Osborne, Charles; Kenneth Thomson, eds. (1980). Klemperer Stories: Anecdotes, Sayings and Impressions of Otto Klemperer. London: Robson Books. ISBN 0-09-158800-6.
- Pettitt, Stephen (1985). Philharmonia Orchestra: A Record of Achievement 1945–1985. London: Robert Hale. ISBN 978-0-7090-2371-5.
