= Exit, pursued by a bear =

Stage direction by Shakespeare

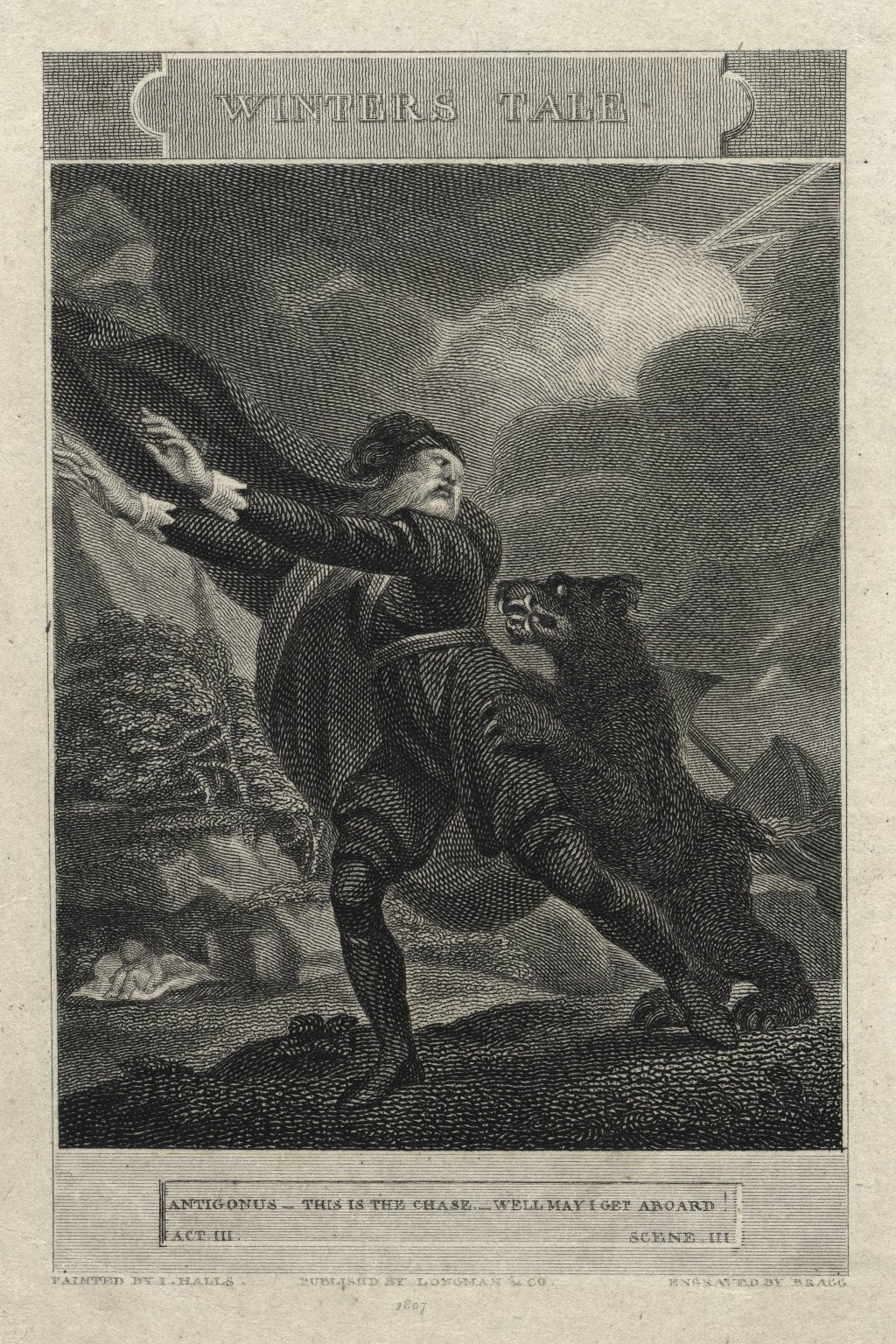
A print depicting the scene by artist Thomas Bragg, in the collection of the Folger Shakespeare Library

"Exit, pursued by a bear", earlier "Exit pursued by a Beare", is a stage direction in act three, scene three of The Winter's Tale, a play by William Shakespeare. It precedes the offstage death of the character Antigonus, who is killed by the bear. The direction is infamous for its difficulty in staging and unintentional comedy. The American Shakespeare Center described the phrase as "Probably the most famous Shakespearean stage direction of all time, at once hilarious and perplexing to modern audiences".

The direction has been executed in various ways by different productions of the play. The bear has been portrayed in costume, as a puppet, as a projected shadow, and as a projected computer animation. It has been theorized that early productions used a real live bear, although this is considered unlikely by contemporary scholarship. Helen Cooper describes the arrangement of the stage entrances at the Globe Theatre, and how the bear would have to come onto the stage by one entrance and be induced to U-turn in order to chase Antigonus off-stage. Bears are unreliable and difficult to train, and there is no historical evidence of live bears ever having been used in Elizabethan era theatre. Maureen Quilligan interprets the evidence differently, however: she notes that performing bears were a feature of entertainments of the time, and not just the reluctant participants in bear baiting. The theatrical impresarios Philip Henslowe and Edward Alleyn were the proprietors of a menagerie that included bears. The audiences of Shakespeare's London were familiar with bears, which were featured in public spectacles and circuses.

Actor David Tennant expounded on the dilemma of staging "Exit, pursued by a bear" on the BBC's Just a Minute, listing a puzzlement of options for theatre directors, including putting an actor in a fuzzy bear suit ("or does that puncture the drama of the moment?"), or taking an expressionistic approach such as a sound or light effect.

== See also ==
- Cultural depictions of bears
