= Sussex Symphony Orchestra =

- Symphony Orchestra
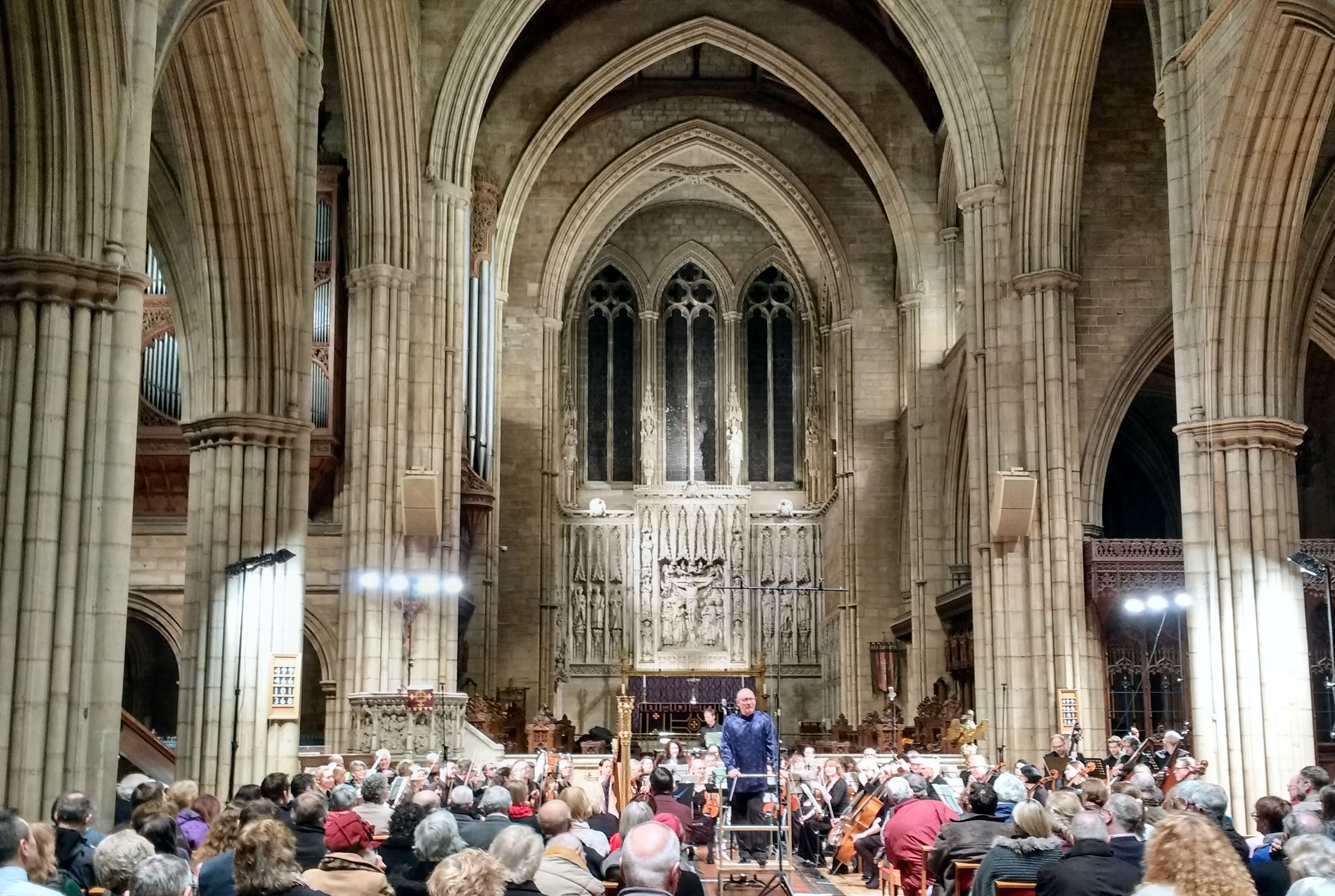
- Concert in All Saints Church, Hove
- Founded: 1993
- Location: Brighton, England
- Music director: Mark Andrew James
- Website: The official website for the Sussex Symphony Orchestra

The Sussex Symphony Orchestra was formed in 1993 by its current musical director Mark Andrew James. Based in Brighton, England, and consisting of both professional and amateur players, the orchestra performs large scale works and promenade concert events at venues in Sussex. The Orchestra, a full symphony orchestra, performs with in excess of 60 players and often more according to the demands of the music being performed. The SSO is composed of gifted musicians, both professional, amateur and students combining the highest levels of musical excellence with a spirit of social responsibility through a shared love of music.

More recently it has also created the SSO Chamber Orchestra which performs at smaller venues across Sussex.

The SSO is proud to be able to say that only people who either work or live within Sussex are invited to play, so it is truly a ‘Sussex’ organization; an orchestra ‘from the community, for the community’

The SSO is committed to the region and involves many other local organizations, such as the Brighton Festival Chorus, Sussex Chorus, Burgess Hill Choral Society, Worthing Philharmonic Choir, Brighton Gay Men’s Chorus and Brighton Orpheus Choir. Children from regional schools have also performed with the SSO, including Roedean, Brighton College, Boundstone Community College, Newmans School and Christ’s Hospital School. It is also committed to supporting local artists and offers the opportunity to the Sussex Young Musician winner to perform with the orchestra, providing a platform to the performer to gain experience and promote their talents.

== Recordings ==
Carr:Crowded Streets with composer Paul Carr (Contemporary, 2000) (audio CD)
