= Ryan Wigglesworth =

English composer and conductor

Ryan Wigglesworth (born 31 August 1979, Yorkshire) is a British composer, conductor and pianist.

== Biography ==
Wigglesworth read music at Oxford University, where he held the position of Organ Scholar at New College, and continued his music studies at the Guildhall School of Music and Drama. From 2007 to 2009, he was a lecturer at Cambridge University and a Fellow of Corpus Christi College. From 2013 to 2015, he was a composing fellow with The Cleveland Orchestra.

Wigglesworth was principal guest conductor of The Hallé from 2015 to 2018. He and his wife, the soprano Sophie Bevan, founded The Davey Consort in 2017. Wigglesworth founded the Knussen Chamber Orchestra in 2019.

Wigglesworth served as composer-in-residence with English National Opera (ENO). For ENO, he composed his opera The Winter's Tale, based on Shakespeare's play of the same name. The opera received its premiere on 27 February 2017. In 2018, he was composer in residence of the Grafenegg Festival in Lower Austria. He has appeared as the soloist of his own Piano Concerto (2019). In 2019, he became the Sir Richard Rodney Bennett Professor at the Royal Academy of Music. Several commercial recordings of Wigglesworth's music are available on such labels as NMC. Wigglesworth has made other commercial recordings for other labels.

In February 2022, the BBC Scottish Symphony Orchestra (BBC SSO) announced the appointment of Wigglesworth as its next chief conductor, effective September 2022. This appointment marks Wigglesworth's first chief conductorship. Wigglesworth is scheduled to conclude his tenure with the BBC SSO at the close of the 2026–2027 season.

Wigglesworth and Bevan have two children. He is not related to the conductor Mark Wigglesworth.

== Selected compositions ==
- Sternenfall (2007)
- The Genesis of Secrecy (2009)
- Augenlieder (2009)
- A First Book of Inventions (2010)
- Violin Concerto (2012)
- Locke's Theatre (2013)
- A Wreath (text by George Herbert; 2014)
- Études-Tableaux (2015)
- The Winter's Tale (opera, 2015-2016)
- Clocks from a Winter's Tale (2017)
- Till Dawning (texts by George Herbert; 2018)
- Piano Concerto (2019)

Cultural offices
Preceded by Thomas Dausgaard	Chief Conductor, BBC Scottish Symphony Orchestra; 2022–present	Succeeded by incumbent
