= Bath Philharmonia =

The Bath Philharmonia is an orchestra based in Bath. They collaborated with Liberal Democrat leader Ed Davey on the 2024 Christmas charity single "Love is Enough".

== Background ==
Bath Philharmonia is one of the leading professional orchestras in the South-West of England. Jason Thornton is the orchestra's Artistic Director.

On 28 November 2024, Liberal Democrat leader Ed Davey released the Christmas charity single "Love is Enough" featuring Bath Philharmonia, entering the race to secure the Christmas number one. His decision to do a Christmas song was inspired by his time as a chorister when he was a teenager. All money raised from downloads and streams of the song will go to the Carers Trust and Bath Philarmonia. Davey said of the song: “I hope people listen to this song and download it and are as impressed as I am by the amazing talent of these young carers. I hope people take some time this Christmas to think about this amazing group of people who look after their loved ones from such an early age. This time of year is tough for all carers, particularly young ones - let's put them in the spotlight.”

== Discography ==
- Paul Carr: Requiem For An Angel (with Sophie Bevan - soprano, Mark Stone - baritone, Chorus Angelorum, Gavin Carr - conductor), Stone Records (2010)
