= Svetlana Kasyan =

Russian operatic soprano (b. 1984)

- Светлана Касьян
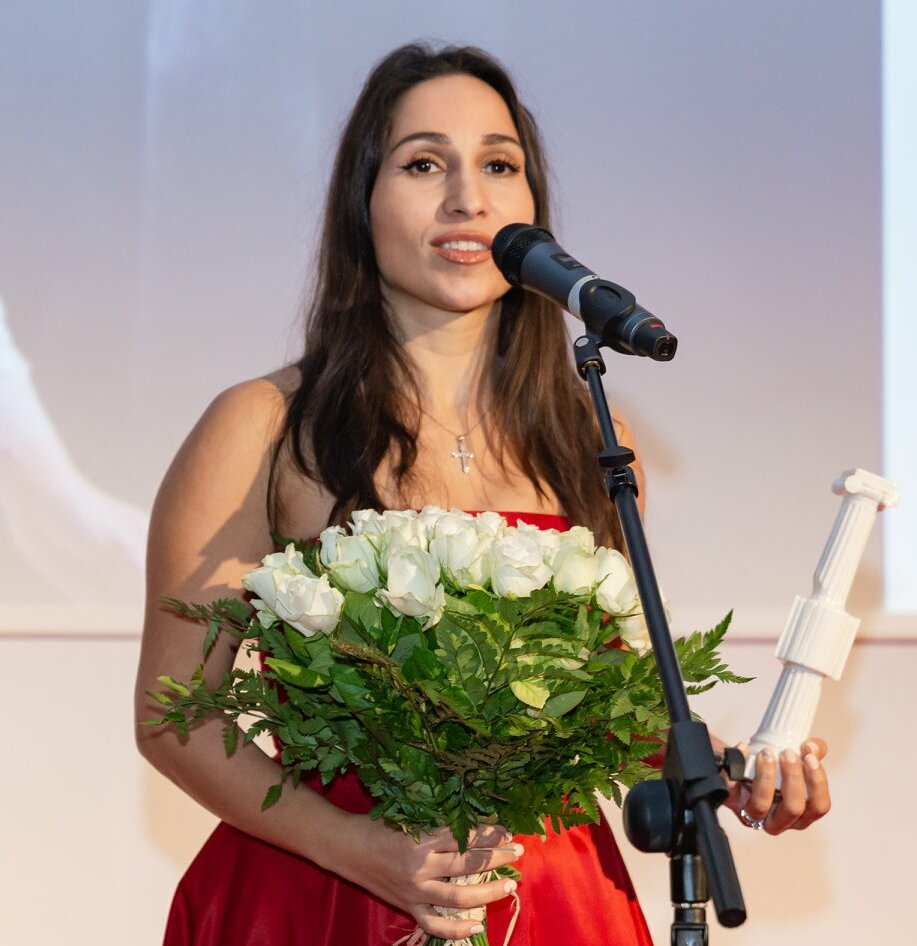
- Svetlana Kasyan, 2019
- Born: 24 July 1984 (age 42); Batumi, Georgian SSR, Soviet Union
- Citizenship: Russian
- Education: Moscow Conservatory
- Occupation: Opera singer (soprano)
- Years active: 2010–present
- Awards: Order of St. Sylvester
- Website: svetlanakasyan.com

Svetlana Davidovna Kasyan (Russian: Светлана Давидовна Касьян, born 24 July 1984) is a Russian-Yezidi operatic soprano.

== Early life and training ==
Svetlana Kasyan was born in a Yezidi Kurdish family on 24 July 1984 in Batumi, Georgian SSR, USSR. In 1993 she moved from Batumi to Aktobe, where she studied at school number 26.

After, in 2006, she entered the music college. Then she studied at the Tchaikovsky Moscow State Conservatory in the class of Galina Pisarenko. She also perfected vocal technique with Dmitry Vdovin and in Washington with Placido Domingo.

From 2009 to 2011 Kasyan was a member of the youth program of the Bolshoi Theatre.

== Career ==
In 2010 she debuted on the Bolshoi Theatre stage in the Kupava party in “The Snow Maiden” opera by Rimsky-Korsakov, and later performed therein “The Love for Three Oranges” by S. Prokofiev and “The Enchantress” by Pyotr Ilyich Tchaikovsky.

In 2011, she performed the title role in the opera Tosca by Giacomo Puccini at the Yekaterinburg Opera and Ballet Theater, and in the same year at the Bolshoi Theatre. Journalists called her "the most promising voice of the world".

In Italy, she debuted in 2011 at Bari in Beethoven’s Symphony No. 9.

In the anniversary issue of the men's magazine “Maxim” in April 2017, she starred in an erotic photo shoot to “attract the attention of the public to the opera art”.

On 17 December 2021, Svetlana Kasyan released her first album called Fratelli Tutti, which she dedicated to Pope Francis for his 85th birthday. The album is made of 14 songs in 14 different languages.

She presented Pope Francis with the album as a gift during on a meeting on 11 January 2022. The work is a compilation of operatic tunes in 14 languages that was intended to promote world unity. The pope commented on Kasyan’s Yezidi heritage, asking that she convey his greetings to all Kurds, Yezidis, and Georgians living in Russia. He then presented her with a book of his own, on which was inscribed:

'What beauty will save the world? Thank you very much, Leonid and Svetlana, for your mystical attitude, for 'making beauty', for making us understand that beauty leads us to God.'
