= Jonathan Cohen (conductor) =

English cellist and conductor (b.1977)

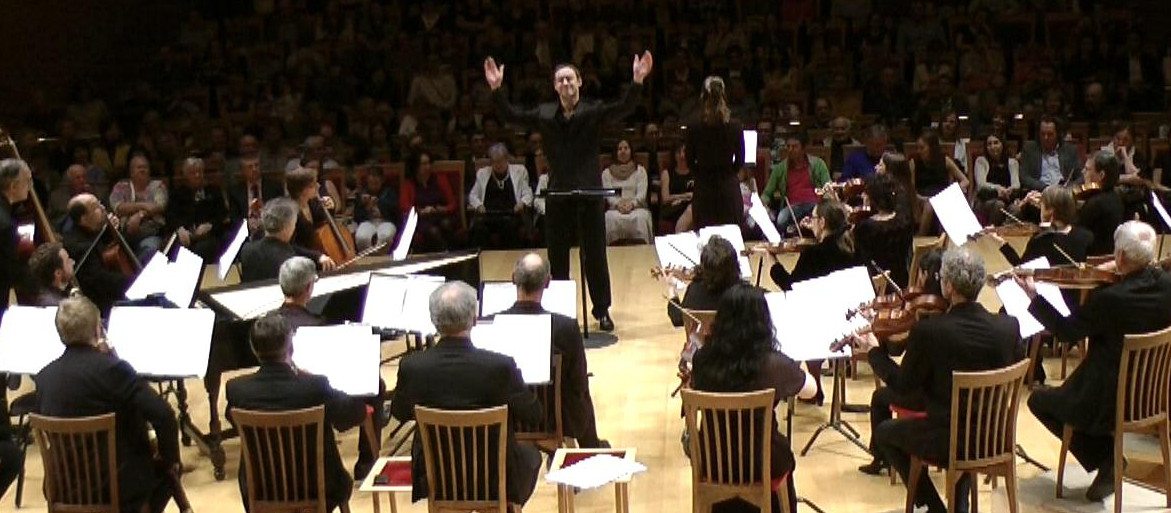
- Jonathan Cohen studio photo
- Born: 17 November 1977 (age 48); Manchester, UK
- Occupation: Conductor of classical music
- Years active: 2000–present

Jonathan Cohen (born 17 November 1977) is an English cellist and conductor.

== Biography ==
After finishing his studies at Clare College, Cambridge, Cohen began his professional career by establishing himself as a cellist. He performed as guest principal with many of the UK's foremost orchestras and ensembles, both symphonic and period. With this experience he developed a speciality in the field of early music and an interest in period instruments. He was a founder member of the London Haydn Quartet in 2000 and continues to perform chamber music with friends and colleagues.

Cohen is artistic director and founder of the British early music ensemble Arcangelo, which he founded in 2010 as an outgrowth of his assembling an orchestra for a recording project with Iestyn Davies, whom he had known since university. With Arcangelo he has recorded a wide range of music, from Porpora and Handel to Gluck and Mozart, including albums for Hyperion Records with soloists Iestyn Davies MBE and Christopher Purves.

Cohen has been the artistic director of the Tetbury Music Festival since 2013. Cohen has served as an Artistic Partner with the Saint Paul Chamber Orchestra (Minnesota, US) and Associate Conductor of Les Arts Florissants.

On 6 October 2016, Les Violons du Roy named Cohen its next music director, effective with the 2017–2018 season. Cohen concluded his tenure as music director of Les Violons du Roy at the close of the 2024-2025 season and now has the title of Chef principal ('Principal director') with the ensemble.

Cohen first guest-conducted the Handel and Haydn Society (H+H) in February 2020. He returned for additional guest appearances in April 2022 and October 2022. In November 2022, H+H announced the appointment of Cohen as its next artistic director, effective with the 2023-2024 season, with an initial contract of five seasons.

== Selected recordings ==
=== As an instrumentalist ===
- Antonio Vivaldi: Cello Concertos The King's Consort, Robert King, Sarah McMahon Hyperion Records 2006
- Joseph Haydn: String Quartet, Op 9 London Haydn Quartet Hyperion Records 2007
- Johann Sebastian Bach: Cantatas BWV 51, 82a, 199 Natalie Dessay and Emanuelle Haim Warner Classics 2008
- Joseph Haydn: String Quartet, Op 17 London Haydn Quartet Hyperion Records 2009
- Air: Daniel Hope, Deutsche Grammophon 2009
- Mozart: An Italian Journey Jeremy Ovenden (tenor) & the Orchestra of the Age of Enlightenment Signum Classics 2011
- Duetti: William Christie Philippe Jaroussky & Max Cencic Erato 2012
- Johann Sebastian Bach: 3 Sonatas for Viola da Gamba and Harpsichord with Nicolas Altstaedt GEN 13268, Genuin Select 2013

=== Conducting Arcangelo ===
- Porpora: Cantatas, Iestyn Davies Arcangelo, Jonathan Cohen Hyperion Records
- Arias for Guadagni, Iestyn DaviesArcangelo, Jonathan Cohen Hyperion Records
- Amoretti Christiane Karg, Arcangelo, Jonathan Cohen Berlin Classics
- Handel: Finest Arias for Base Voice Christopher Purves, Arcangelo, Jonathan Cohen Hyperion Records
- Enchanted Forest Anna Prohaska, Arcangelo, Jonathan Cohen Archiv Produktion
- Johann Sebastian Bach: Mass in B Minor, Arcangelo, Jonathan Cohen (Hyperion Records, CDA68051/2, 2014)
- Wolfgang Amadeus Mozart: violin concertos Vilde Frang, Arcangelo, & Jonathan Cohen Warner Classics
- Scene! Christiane Karg, Arcangelo, & Jonathan Cohen Berlin Classics
- Arias for Benucci: Matthew Rose, Arcangelo, Jonathan Cohen (Hyperion Records, CDA68078, 2015)
- Johann Sebastian Bach: Violin Concertos with Arcangelo & Alina Ibragimova, violin (Hyperion Records, CDA68068, 2015)
- Carl Philipp Emanuel Bach: Cello Concertos with Nicolas Altstaedt (cello), Arcangelo & Jonathan Cohen (conductor) (Hyperion Records, CDA68112, 2016)
- Johann Sebastian Bach: Cantatas No 54, 82 and 170 Iestyn Davies, Arcangelo, & Jonathan Cohen (Hyperion Records, CDA68111, 2016)
- François Couperin: L'Apothéose de Lully & Leçons de ténèbres Arcangelo, & Jonathan Cohen (Hyperion Records, CDA68093, 2017)
- Dietrich Buxtehude: Sonatas Opus 1, Arcangelo & Jonathan Cohen, Alpha Classics, [1] Alpha 367, 2017, nominated for a Grammy Award 2018.
- John Blow: Odes, Samuel Boden, Thomas Walker, Arcangelo & Jonathan Cohen, Hyperion Records, [2] CDA68149, 2017, nominated for a 2018 BBC Music Magazine Award
- Bach: Magnificats, Joélle Harvey, Olivia Vermeulen, Iestyn Davies, Thomas Walker, Thomas E. Bauer, Arcangelo & Jonathan Cohen, Hyperion Records, [3] CDA68157, 2018

Cultural offices
Preceded by Bernard Labadie	Music Director, Les Violons du Roy; 2017–2025	Succeeded by Bernard Labadie
Preceded by Harry Christophers	Music Director, Handel and Haydn Society; 2023–present	Succeeded by incumbent
