= Arcangelo (ensemble) =

UK-based early music ensemble

Arcangelo is a UK-based early music ensemble founded by Jonathan Cohen in 2010. It performs and records music from the Baroque, Classical, and early Romantic repertoire, ranging from Monteverdi to Beethoven. It is noted for its approach based on the collaborative tradition of chamber music making.

Its cast varies in size, from small instrumental repertoire of 4 musicians to large choral works of 80 such as J. S. Bach's Mass in B Minor.

Performances and tours have included appearances at Wigmore Hall, Aldeburgh Festival, Edinburgh Festival, BBC Proms, The Globe's Sam Wanamaker Playhouse, Hampton Court Palace, Tetbury Music Festival, Carnegie Hall, Salzburg Festival, Musikverein Vienna and Berliner Philharmonie.

It was the first ever Baroque Ensemble in Residence at Wigmore Hall in the 2016–17 concert season

== Musicians and soloists ==
Arcangelo has performed with soloists including Iestyn Davies MBE (counter tenor), Christiane Karg (soprano), Matthew Rose (bass), Vilde Frang (violin), Alina Ibragimova (violin), Tim Mead (counter tenor), Nicolas Altstaedt (cello), Christopher Purves (baritone), Anna Prohaska (soprano), and Louise Alder (soprano)

Its ranks are cast from both the UK and continental Europe, and include young emerging musicians who are invited to the group as part of their artistic and career development.

== Recordings ==
=== Labels that the ensemble has recorded under ===
- Hyperion Records
- Berlin Classics
- Universal Music / Archiv Produktion
- Warner Classics
- Alpha Classics

=== Discography and awards ===
- Porpora: Cantatas, Iestyn Davies, Arcangelo, Jonathan Cohen Hyperion Records, CDA67894, 2011
- Arias for Guadagni, Iestyn Davies, Arcangelo, Jonathan Cohen Hyperion Records, CDA67924, 2012, Gramophone Award Winner 2012 and Sky Arts South Bank Awards Nominee 2013
- Amoretti Christiane Karg, Arcangelo, Jonathan Cohen Berlin Classics, 885470003894, 2012
- Handel's: Finest Arias for Base Voice, Vol. 1, Christopher Purves, Arcangelo, Jonathan Cohen Hyperion Records, CDA67842, 2012, Gramophone Award Nominee 2013, BBC Music Magazine Award Nominee 2014, and The Stanley Sadie Handel Recording Prize Nominee 2013
- Enchanted Forest Anna Prohaska, Arcangelo, Jonathan Cohen Deutsche Grammophon / Archiv Produktion, 02894790077, 2013, and a track included on Canti Amorosi (2014), also on Das Händel Album (2016) and on the Handel: The Essentials (2017) compilations on Deutsche Grammophon, and one on the Vivaldi: The Classics (2016) compilation on U-5 Records, 7332849150985.
- Claudio Monteverdi: Madrigals of Love and Loss James Gilchrist, Arcangelo, Jonathan Cohen Hyperion Records, CDA68019, 2014
- Johann Sebastian Bach Mass in B Minor, Arcangelo, Jonathan Cohen Hyperion Records, CDA68051/2, 2014, Gramophone Award Finalist, 2015
- W.A. Mozart violin concertos Vilde Frang, Arcangelo, Jonathan Cohen Warner Classics, 0825646276776, 2015, BBC Music Magazine: Concerto Choice March 2015, W.A. Mozart Sinfonia Concertante named Best recording, Gramophone Magazine 2015, Echo Klassik Award winner 2015, Number 1 in the UK specialist classical chart on 1 March 2015, Number 13 in the German classical chart in March 2015, and a track included on the 'Classical 2016' 2-CD compilation on Warner Classics
- Scene! Christiane Karg, Arcangelo, Jonathan Cohen Berlin Classics, 885470006468, 2015, International Opera Awards Nominee 2016, Gramophone Award finalist 2016, and Echo Klassik Award winner 2016; 5 tracks from Amoretti and Scene! feature on Portrait, a compilation disc by Christiane Karg released in 2016 on Berlin Classics
- Wolfgang Amadeus Mozart and Joseph Haydn: concertos Nicolas Altstaedt (cello), Alfredo Bernardini (oboe), Ilya Gringolts (violin), Peter Whelan (bassoon), Arcangelo, Jonathan Cohen Hyperion Records, CDA68051, 2015
- Arias for Benucci Matthew Rose, Arcangelo, Jonathan Cohen Hyperion Records, CDA68078, 2015, International Opera Awards Nominee 2016
- Johann Sebastian Bach: Violin Concertos with Alina Ibragimova (violin), Arcangelo & Jonathan Cohen Hyperion Records, CDA68068, 2015, Presto Classical Disc of the Year 2015, was Number 1 in the UK specialist classical chart on 12 November 2015 and Number 14 in the US Billboard chart on 7 November 2015
- Carl Philipp Emanuel Bach: Cello Concertos with Nicolas Altstaedt (cello), Arcangelo & Jonathan Cohen Hyperion Records, CDA68112, 2016, Finalist, International Classical Music Award 2017, was listed by US National Public Radio as one of the 1 best classical albums of 2016, Number 5 in the UK specialist classical chart on 8 September 2016 and Number 13 in the US Billboard chart on 13 September 2016, and won a 2017 BBC Music Magazine Concerto Award
- Johann Sebastian Bach Cantatas No 54, 82 and 170 Iestyn Davies, Arcangelo, & Jonathan Cohen Hyperion Records, CDA68111, 2016, Number 1 in the UK specialist classical chart on 19 January 2017, 2017 Gramophone Award Winner in the Baroque Vocal category. One of the Sunday Times best albums of 2017; one of BBC Radio 3 Album Review Critics' Choice for 2017; one of Opera News' best albums of 2017.
- François Couperin L'Apothéose de Lully & Leçons de ténèbres Katherine Watson, Anna Dennis, Arcangelo & Jonathan Cohen Hyperion Records, CDA68093, 2017
- Dietrich Buxtehude Sonatas Opus 1, Arcangelo & Jonathan Cohen, Alpha Classics, Alpha 367, 2017, nominated for a Grammy Award 2018.
- John Blow, Odes, Samuel Boden, Thomas Walker, Arcangelo & Jonathan Cohen Hyperion Records, CDA68149, 2017, nominated for a 2018 BBC Music Magazine Award
- CPE Bach, JC Bach, JS Bach Magnificats, Joélle Harvey, Olivia Vermeulen, Iestyn Davies, Thomas Walker, Thomas E. Bauer, Arcangelo & Jonathan Cohen, Hyperion Records, CDA68157, 2018, nominated for a Gramophone Award 2018
- Marc-Antoine Charpentier, Leçons de ténèbres, Litanies & Magnificat, Samuel Boden, Stephane Degout, Arcangelo & Jonathan Cohen Hyperion Records, CDA68171, 2018
- Handel's: Finest Arias for Base Voice, Vol. 2, Christopher Purves, Arcangelo, Jonathan Cohen Hyperion Records, CDA67152, 2018

== Media ==
- Arcangelo video clips from recordings for Hyperion Records , 2011-ongoing
- Video clip published by Berlin Classics about Christiane Karg's album Amoretti with Arcangelo: , 2012
- Video clips from Enchanted Forest, Anna Prohaska with Arcangelo, and other related programmes: , 2013
- Arcangelo replay of WQXR radio broadcast at Carnegie Hall, with Alina Ibragimova , 2013
- Video clip published by Berlin Classics about Christiane Karg's album Scene! with Arcangelo: , 2015
- Video clips published by Warner Classics about Vilde Frang's album of Mozart Violin concertos with Arcangelo: , 2015
- BBC Music Magazine podcast: Johann Sebastian Bach violin concertos Alina Ibragimova, Arcangelo, Recording of the Month
- Arcangelo filmed performance with Isabelle Faust (violin) for the Wigmore Hall 115th Anniversary Celebration concert, , June 2016
- Video clips from Arcangelo at the BBC The Proms at The Globe's Sam Wanamaker Playhouse , August 2016
- Arcangelo video clip about the Buxtehude Opus 1 recording, July 2017
