= Joseph Middleton =

British pianist (born 1981)

- Born: 10 January 1981 (age 45); Cirencester, England, United Kingdom
- Education: University of Birmingham
- Children: 2

Joseph Middleton (born 10 January 1981) is a British classical pianist and lied accompanist.

== Biography ==
Middleton was born in Cirencester, Gloucestershire. At school he played piano, violin, flute and organ. He read music at the University of Birmingham where he graduated with the concerto and conducting awards, a first class BMus and MPhil, and went on to study on an EMI Entrance Scholarship at the Royal Academy of Music. At the academy he studied with Malcolm Martineau and Michael Dussek and won all the academy's piano accompaniment awards, in addition to those at the Wigmore Hall International Song Competition, Kathleen Ferrier Awards, Richard Tauber Award, Royal Over-Seas League Competition and Geoffrey Parsons Award. On leaving the Royal Academy his first engagements were with Sir Thomas Allen (baritone) who invited him to tour North America, perform at Wigmore Hall and join him for his 70th birthday tour of Winterreise, and with Dame Felicity Lott, with whom he recorded Elgar songs. Soon after, the mezzo-soprano Dame Sarah Connolly invited him to be a regular collaborator and they performed all over the world and recorded together. He held a Junior Fellowship at the Royal College of Music before returning to teach at the RAM and subsequently had the title Fellow conferred upon him. He was the first accompanist to win the Royal Philharmonic Society Young Artist Award and to be listed in the Evening Standard as one of London's Most Influential People. He is one of the most frequently heard pianists on BBC Radio 3 and a regular collaborator on the BBC Radio 3 New Generation Artists scheme.

He holds the post of musician-in-residence at Pembroke College, Cambridge, and has been admitted as a Bye-Fellow and is director of Leeds Lieder. At Pembroke he programmes and plays for the Bliss International Concert Series which attracts the world's finest singers to the city. He founded and directs the Pembroke Lieder Scheme which has trained a generation of leading singers and pianists. Under his watch at Leeds Lieder the Festival has grown from a biennial event to an annual Festival of international standing complemented by an associated concert season and touring programme. It has been nominated for a RPS Award, commissions widely and won the J. M. Barrie Award for its educational work in Leeds schools. His predecessors as artistic directors at Leeds Lieder include Graham Johnson, Julius Drake, Malcolm Martineau, Roger Vignoles and Iain Burnside.

Best known for accompanying singers and for his programming flair he has partnered with Sir Thomas Allen, Louise Alder, Mary Bevan, Ian Bostridge, Allan Clayton, Dame Sarah Connolly, Lucy Crowe, Iestyn Davies, Fatma Said, Wolfgang Holzmair, Christiane Karg, Katarina Karnéus, Angelika Kirchschlager, Dame Felicity Lott, Christopher Maltman, John Mark Ainsley, Ann Murray DBE, Mark Padmore, Miah Persson, Amanda Roocroft, Kate Royal, Matthew Rose (bass), Carolyn Sampson, Nicky Spence and Roderick Williams.

He has played in music centres across the world, including: London's Wigmore Hall, Royal Opera House and Royal Festival Hall, New York's Alice Tully Hall and Park Avenue Armory, Concertgebouw, Amsterdam, Konzerthaus, Vienna, Tonhalle, Zürich, Kölner Philharmonie, Oper Frankfurt, Philharmonie Luxembourg, Musée d'Orsay, Paris, Liceu, Barcelona, Elbphilharmonie, Hamburg, Palau de la Música Catalana, Oji Hall Tokyo and festivals in Aix-en-Provence, Aldeburgh, Barcelona, Baden Baden, Schloss Elmau, deSingel, Edinburgh, Munich, Ravinia, San Francisco, Schubertiade Schwarzenberg, Seoul, Stuttgart, Toronto and Vancouver. He made his BBC Proms debut in 2016 alongside Iestyn Davies and Carolyn Sampson and returned in 2018 alongside Dame Sarah Connolly where they premiered recently discovered songs by Benjamin Britten and launched their recital CD for Chandos

He has a discography which has resulted in an Edison Award with Carolyn Sampson and numerous nominations for Gramophone and BBC Music Magazine Awards. His recordings on Harmonia Mundi, Chandos, BIS, Signum and Champs Hill Records with Dame Sarah Connolly, Carolyn Sampson, Iestyn Davies, Ruby Hughes, Amanda Roocroft, Louise Alder, Mary Bevan, Christopher Maltman have been selected as Disc of the Year in: The Sunday Times; American Record Guide; International Classical Music Awards and on Radio France. His interest in the song repertoire has led Gramophone magazine to describe him as "the absolute king of programming".

== Personal life ==
Middleton lives near London with his wife and two children. He has a younger sister.

== Select discography ==
- Lines written during a sleepless night, with Louise Alder (Chandos 2020)
- The Contrast, English Poetry in Song, with Carolyn Sampson (BIS 2020)
- The Divine Muse, with Mary Bevan (Signum 2020)
- The Soldier, with Christopher Maltman (Signum 2019)
- Reason in Madness, with Carolyn Sampson (BIS 2019)
- Come into my Dreams, with Dame Sarah Connolly (Signum 2018)
- A Soprano's Schubertiade, with Carolyn Sampson (BIS 2018)
- Voyages, with Mary Bevan (Signum 2017)
- Debussy and Mozart Songs, with Kate Royal, Nicky Spence, Ashley Riches (BBC Music Magazine Cover CD 2017)
- Lost is my Quiet, with Carolyn Sampson and Iestyn Davies (BIS 2017)
- Strauss Lieder, with Louise Alder (Orchid Classics 2017)
- A Verlaine Songbook, with Carolyn Sampson (BIS 2016)
- Songs to the Moons, with Allan Clayton et al. (Signum 2016)
- Nocturnal Variations, with Ruby Hughes (CHR 2016)
- Songs by Purcell realized by Britten, with Ruby Hughes, Anna Grevelius, Robin Blaze, Allan Clayton, Benedict Nelson, Matthew Rose (CHR 2016)
- Fleurs, with Carolyn Sampson (BIS 2015)
- This Other Eden, with Kitty Whately (CHR 2015)
- Love said to me, with Caroline MacPhie (Stone Records 2014)
- Cheryl Frances-Hoad Songs, with Jennifer Johnston (CHR 2014)
- Ludwig Thuille Lieder, with Sophie Bevan (CHR 2013)
- Tell Me the Truth About Love, with Amanda Roocroft (CHR 2013)
- Elgar Songs, with Dame Felicity Lott (CHR 2011)
- Spanish Songs, with Clara Mouriz (Sonimage 2010)
