= Arcangelo =

Arcangelo is a given name and a family name meaning "Archangel", the highest rank of angels.

Notable people with the name include:

- Andrea di Cione Arcangelo (1308–1368), Italian painter, sculptor, and architect active in Florence
- Antonio di Arcangelo, Italian painter, active in Florence in a Renaissance style, between 1520 and 1538
- Arcangelo Califano (1730–1750), baroque composer and cellist
- Arcangelo Placenza da Calatafimi, (1390–1460) venerated Italian Franciscan friar and preacher
- Arcangelo Canetoli (1460–1513), venerated Catholic priest
- Arcangelo Cascieri (1902–1997), influential sculptor, major figure in Boston Architectural College in Boston, Massachusetts
- Arcangelo Chiocchetti (1921–2001), Italian cross-country skier
- Arcangelo di Cola (active 1416–1429) Italian late-Gothic painter
- Arcangelo Corelli (1653–1713), Italian violinist and composer of Baroque music
- Arcangelo Ghisleri (1855–1938), geographer who created numerous maps of Africa
- Arcangelo Guglielmelli (c. 1650 – 1723), Italian architect and painter from Naples
- Arcangelo Madrignano (died 1529), Italian Catholic prelate and Bishop of Avellino e Frigento
- Arcangelo Pinelli (born 1944), Italian fencer
- Arcangelo Resani (1670–1740), Italian painter of the Baroque period
- Arcangelo Salimbeni (c. 1536 – 1579), Italian Mannerist painter active in Sienna
- Arcangelo Sannicandro (born 1943), Italian lawyer and politician from Apulia
- Arcangelo Sassolino (born 1967), Italian artist
- Arcangelo Scacchi (1810–1893), Italian physician, mineralogist, malacologist, and naturalist
- Arcangelo Tadini (1846–1912), Catholic priest, beatified on 24 October 2001, canonized on 19 April 2009
- Arcangela Felice Assunta Wertmuller von Elgg (1928-2021), Italian screenwriter and director professionally known as Lina Wertmüller
- Arcangelo, a British classical ensemble led by cellist Jonathan Cohen (conductor)

Arcangelo may also refer to:

- Arcangelo (horse), a thoroughbred racehorse that won the 2023 Belmont Stakes

== See also ==
- San Michele Arcangelo (disambiguation)
- Arc Angel (disambiguation)
- Arc Angels
- Arcangeli
- Archangel
- Archangelos (disambiguation)
- Arkangel (disambiguation)
- Angelo
