= Johanna Müller-Hermann =

Austrian composer and pedagogue (1868 - 1941)

- Born: 15 January 1868
- Died: 19 April 1941 (aged 73)
- Known for: orchestral and chamber music

Johanna Müller-Hermann (15 January 1868 – 19 April 1941) was an Austrian composer and pedagogue.

== Life ==
Johanna Hermann began to receive music lessons at an early age, together with her two siblings. This was in keeping with the middle-class ideal of education; her father was a section head in the Austrian Ministry of Culture and Education in Vienna, and thus belonged to the upper echelons of the civil service. In accordance with the circumstances of the time, however, she was unable to pursue her musical ambitions; instead she graduated from a teacher training college and taught for several years at a public education school in Vienna.

When she married Otto Müller-Martini, a transport expert, in 1893, she was no longer required to work and continued her musical studies. This was followed by piano and violin lessons, and instruction in music theory. She studied under Guido Adler, Alexander von Zemlinsky, Josef Bohuslav Foerster and Franz Schmidt. Her first published work, Seven Songs, was printed in 1895. Public performances of her works took place at the Vienna Musikverein and at women's composition evenings, where she also met Mathilde Kralik von Meyrswalden. In 1918, Johanna Müller-Herrmann succeeded her teacher Joseph Bohuslav Foerster as professor of music theory at the New Vienna Conservatory teaching there until 1932.

She left behind an extensive body of work: songs, chamber music, large-scale works for solos, choir and orchestra, mostly on a literary and programmatic basis. After her death, Wilhelm Furtwängler, among others, campaigned for the preservation of her work.

== Oeuvre ==
Müller-Hermann wrote an oratorio, Lied der Erinnerung: In Memoriam, to a text by Walt Whitman, and a symphonic fantasy on the Ibsen play Brand. Her Lied der Erinnerung: In Memoriam (1930) is a work of grand scale. It employs a large orchestra, a chorus, and solo voices. This piece follows the tradition of Arnold Schoenberg's Gurre-Lieder. Müller-Hermann may have been directly acquainted with Schoenberg, as suggested by a letter she wrote to him in 1911.

== Reception ==
Müller-Hermann was among the foremost European female composers of orchestral and chamber music in her day. Despite her contemporary fame, not much has been written about her. According to Dr. Carola Darwin, "The contribution of women to Vienna's creative life at this period has been largely forgotten as the result of Nazi ideology, as well as the general destruction of the Second World War... Johanna Müller-Hermann's works deserve a much wider hearing, not only because of their intrinsic quality, but also because they were an integral part of the Vienna's extraordinary creative flowering."

In 1995 her Heroic Overture Op. 21 and her Epilogue to the Tragedy Brand, a symphonic fantasy after Ibsen's drama for large orchestra, Op. 25 (Thorofon, Frauentöne Vol. 1), were released on CD; followed in 1999 by her String Quartet in E♭ major, Op. 6 (Nimbus on Naxos).

== Selected works ==
=== Voice and orchestra ===
- Zwei Frauenchöre mit Orchester, Op. 10
- Deutscher Schwur for male choir and orchestra, Op. 22 (1915)
- Zwei Gesänge for Voice solo with orchestra, Op. 33. l. Trauminsel ('Dream Island'). 2. Liebeshymnus ('Hymn to Love'). Poet for both is Tona Hermann.
- Lied der Erinnerung: In Memoriam (1930) for voices, chorus and large orchestra.

=== Vocal music ===
- Sieben Lieder, Op. 1 (for solo voice and piano, Gutmann, 1895)
- Fünf Lieder, Op. 2 (for solo voice and piano)
- Vier Lieder, Op. 4 (for solo voice and piano)
- Zwei Frauenchöre, Op. 10 (1915)
- Zwei Gedichte von Goethe, Op. 11. 1. Nähe des Geliebten. 2. An die Entfernte.
- Vier Lieder, Op. 14, after J. P. Jacobsen for 1 voice with piano accompaniment. 1. Landschaft. 2. Sonnenuntergang. Den Lenz laß kommen. Polka. (1915, dedicated to Alma Mahler-Werfel)
- Drei Lieder, Op. 19
- Vier Lieder, Op. 20
- Herbstlieder, Op. 28
- Drei Lieder, Op. 32 (Nr. 1 with orchestral accompaniment). 1. Vorfrühling ('Early Spring'); poem by Hugo von Hofmannsthal).

=== Cantatas ===
- Lied der Erinnerung, Op. 30

=== Chamber music ===
- Violin Sonata in D minor, Op. 5 (1907)
- String Quartet in E♭ major, Op. 6 (1912)
- String Quintet in A minor, Op. 7 (1909)
- Cello Sonata in G major, Op. 17 (1923)
- Piano Quintet in g minor, Op. 31 (1932)

=== Orchestral music ===
- Heroische Overtüre, Op. 21 (1916)
- Symphonic Fantasie, Op. 25
- Epilog zu einer Tragödie: "Brand", Op. 25 (1919)

=== Sonatas ===
- Sonate d-Moll für Violine und Klavier, Op. 5
- Clavier-Sonate in f-moll, Op. 8
- Sonate für Violoncello und Klavier, Op. 17

== Discography ==
- Soraya Mafi (soprano), Simon Lepper (piano), Kitty Whately (mezzo-soprano), Joseph Middleton (piano), Hiroaki Takenouchi (piano), Artis Quartet (strings), Studying with Zemlinsky: Johanna Müller-Hermann (2023) (BBC Radio 3) Radio Broadcast
- Kitty Whately (mezzo-soprano), Joseph Middleton (piano) Befreit: A Soul Surrendered (2023) (Chandos CHAN20177) CD
