= Leeds Lieder =

Leeds Lieder is a classical music organisation based in the city of Leeds in Yorkshire, UK. It was established as a registered charity in 2004 in order to create a new platform for Lieder and other forms of art song. Its founder and first director was Jane Anthony. Following Anthony's death in 2014, she was succeeded as director by the pianist Joseph Middleton. Leeds Lieder's President is Elly Ameling.

Leeds Lieder conducts its work through the promotion of concerts and through a range of education and outreach activity. Described in The Times as 'one of the most exuberant and far-reaching festivals of art-song in the UK', and by the Austrian Cultural Forum as 'a superb weekend of song', it is best known for its festivals, which have taken place in Leeds since 2005. These were biennial until 2016; since then they have become annual events. Many distinguished singers have appeared at the festivals, including Sir Thomas Allen, Dame Margaret Price, Florian Boesch, Robert Holl, Barbara Bonney, Christiane Karg, Dame Felicity Lott, Mark Padmore, Carolyn Sampson, Angelika Kirchschlager, Dame Sarah Connolly and James Gilchrist. Until 2016 each festival was curated by a different guest artistic director. These included pianists Iain Burnside (2005), Roger Vignoles (2007), Julius Drake (2009), Malcolm Martineau (2011), Graham Johnson (2013), and baritone Roderick Williams (2016). From 2017 the artistic direction has been undertaken by Leeds Lieder Director Joseph Middleton. Leeds Lieder is committed to new music, and has commissioned works from a number of eminent composers, including Sally Beamish, Judith Bingham, Gavin Bryars, Mark Simpson, Cheryl Frances-Hoad and Gabriel Jackson.

Until 2019, Leeds Lieder's principal partner was Leeds College of Music, where the festival took place, with concerts also held throughout the year in the Howard Assembly Rooms at Leeds Grand Theatre, and at the University of Leeds. The 2020 festival was held at the University of Leeds.

== Awards ==
- Nominated for a Royal Philharmonic Society Award
- Winner of J.M.Barrie Award from Action for Children’s Arts
