= La Nuova Musica =

La Nuova Musica is an early music ensemble based in the United Kingdom that was founded in 2007 by countertenor David Bates.

They have been regarded as "‘one of the most exciting consorts in the early music field" by BBC 3 Radio. The ensemble focuses on music from across the Baroque and Classical periods (1600-1800), alongside new commissions by composers including Nico Muhly, Luke Styles, Anna Thorvaldsdottir, Edmund Finnis and Cassandra Miller. The group performs regularly at Wigmore Hall in London, along with La Seine Musicale, the Göttingen International Handel Festival, the Salzburg Festival, and the Innsbruck Festival of Early Music.

Their repertoire includes many forgotten and lesser-known pieces of literature like Francesco Bartolomeo Conti’s final opera Issipile, cantatas by Agostino Steffani, and motets by Alessandro Grandi.

== Albums ==
La Nuova's albums are released by independent record label Harmonia Mundi and Pentatone.

- Il Circolo Di Giulio Caccini (2008)
- Handel: Il Pastor Fido (2012)
- Dixit Dominus (2013)
- Sacrifices (2014)
- A Royal Trio: Arias by Handel, Bononcini & Ariosti (2014) with American countenor Lawrence Zazzo
- F. Couperin: Leçons De Ténèbre (2016)
- Pergolesi: Stabat Mater - Bach: Cantatas BWV 54 & 170 (2017), with soprano Lucy Crowe and countertenor Tim Mead
- Gluck: Orfeo ed Euridice, Wq. 30 [Live] (2019) with countertenor Iestyn Davies
- Handel's Unsung Heroes (2021), with soprano Lucy Crowe and countertenor Iestyn Davies
