= Eric Schneider (pianist) =

German classical pianist and Lied accompanist

- Born: 1963
- Origin: Bergisches Land, West Germany
- Genres: Classical music, Lied
- Occupation: Pianist
- Instrument: Piano
- Years active: 1980s–present

Eric Schneider (born 1963) is a German classical pianist, Lied accompanist and university teacher. He has worked with singers including Matthias Goerne, Christine Schäfer, Christiane Oelze and Anna Prohaska, and has recorded for labels including Decca Records, Deutsche Grammophon, Onyx Classics, Genuin Classics and MDG. Schneider has been a Steinway Artist since 2007. He is an honorary professor at the Berlin University of the Arts, where he teaches contemporary song and leads a Lied class.

== Early life and education ==
Schneider comes from the Bergisches Land region of Germany. He studied mathematics at the University of Cologne and piano at the Cologne University of Music. At the age of 22, he completed his artistic diploma examination in piano with distinction.

After receiving prizes in piano competitions and appearing in solo recitals, Schneider undertook postgraduate study in Lied interpretation with Hartmut Höll. He received further artistic guidance from the pianists Bruno Leonardo Gelber, Paul Badura-Skoda and Alfred Brendel, and from the singers Elisabeth Schwarzkopf and Dietrich Fischer-Dieskau. During the 1990s, he also studied orchestral conducting with Rolf Reuter at the Hochschule für Musik Hanns Eisler Berlin.

== Career ==
Schneider has appeared as a Lied pianist at venues including La Scala in Milan, Wigmore Hall in London, Carnegie Hall in New York and Tokyo Opera City. His festival appearances have included the Schubertiade Vorarlberg, the Salzburg Festival and the Tanglewood Music Festival. As a solo pianist, he has given recitals at the Festspielhaus Baden-Baden, Kissinger Sommer, Beethovenfest Bonn and the Ruhr Piano Festival.

Schneider formed a long-running recital and recording partnership with the baritone Matthias Goerne. Their recordings include Hanns Eisler's The Hollywood Songbook, Schubert's Die schöne Müllerin and collections of songs by Robert Schumann. Their performances were reviewed in the international press, including recitals at London's Wigmore Hall.

With soprano Anna Prohaska, Schneider recorded the albums Sirène (2011) and Behind the Lines (2014) for Deutsche Grammophon. Behind the Lines was based on a recital programme about war and its consequences. Prohaska and Schneider toured the programme to venues including Wigmore Hall, the Vienna Konzerthaus and the Konzerthaus Berlin, as well as the Salzburg and Edinburgh festivals.

Schneider has also recorded Schubert's Winterreise and George Crumb's Apparition with Christine Schäfer. His later recordings include song recitals with soprano Eva Resch and Mahler's songs from Des Knaben Wunderhorn with mezzo-soprano Katharina Kammerloher and baritone Arttu Kataja.

Since 2009, Schneider has led a Lied class at the Berlin University of the Arts where he is an honorary professor and lecturer in contemporary song.

== Selected discography ==
- Hanns Eisler: The Hollywood Songbook, with Matthias Goerne (Decca, 1998)
- Franz Schubert: Die schöne Müllerin, with Matthias Goerne (Decca, 2002)
- Robert Schumann: Lieder to Poems by Heine, Lenau, Rückert, Eichendorff and Others, with Matthias Goerne (Decca, 2004)
- Franz Schubert: Winterreise, with Christine Schäfer (Onyx Classics, 2006)
- Sirène, with Anna Prohaska (Deutsche Grammophon, 2011)
- Behind the Lines, with Anna Prohaska (Deutsche Grammophon, 2014)
- Eden, with Eva Resch (Genuin Classics, 2019)
- Gustav Mahler: Lieder aus Des Knaben Wunderhorn, with Katharina Kammerloher and Arttu Kataja (MDG, 2024)
- Red, with Eva Resch (Genuin Classics, 2025)
