= Anna Prohaska =

Austrian soprano

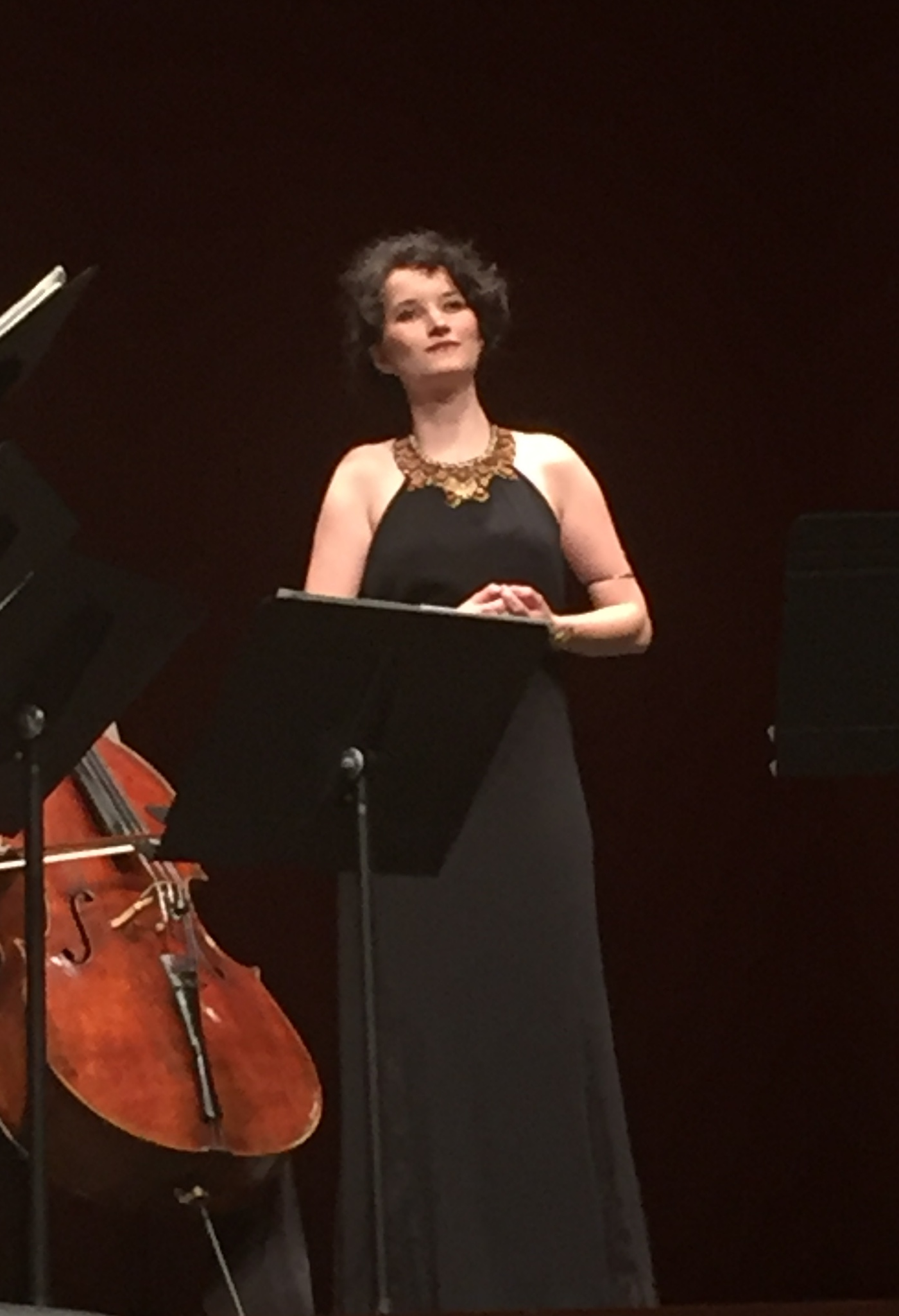
- Prohaska in a recital at Centre cultural l'Atlàntida (Vic, Spain). May 2016
- Born: June 27, 1983 (age 43); Neu-Ulm, West Germany
- Occupation: Soprano singer
- Years active: 2002–present
- Organisation: Berlin State Opera
- Website: www.annaprohaska.com

Anna Prohaska (born June 27, 1983) is an Austrian-British lyric soprano. She lives in Berlin.

== Career ==
Anna Prohaska studied in Berlin at the Hanns Eisler Academy of Music. Prohaska made her debut in 2002 at the Komische Oper in Harry Kupfer’s production of Britten’s The Turn of the Screw. In 2003 she was selected for the Académie européenne de musique in Aix-en-Provence, and in 2006 for the Internationale Händelakademie Karlsruhe. In 2006 she was engaged as a member of the permanent ensemble at the Berlin State Opera under Daniel Barenboim. Since 2007, she has worked closely with the Berliner Philharmoniker. Beside her wide standard repertoire, she is a modern and early music specialist. Prohaska performed the world premiere of Rihm's Mnemosyne in 2009 with the Scharoun Ensemble, and Requiem-Strophen in 2017 with the Bavarian Radio Symphony Orchestra. She appeared as Inanna in the world premiere of Jörg Widmann's Babylon in October 2012, with the Bavarian State Opera conducted by Kent Nagano.

== Awards ==
- 2005 Hanns-Eisler-Preis für Komposition und Interpretation zeitgenössischer Musik
- 2008 Daphne-Preis
- 2010 Schneider-Schott Music Prize
- 2012 Echo Deutscher Musikpreis Klassik (Newcomer award) for her album Sirène
- 2016 Kunstpreis Berlin (performing arts)
- 2017 International Classical Music Awards (Baroque vocal) for her album Serpent & Fire

== Discography ==
- Giovanni Battista Pergolesi: Stabat Mater Bernarda Fink, Akademie für Alte Musik Berlin, Bernhard Forck. Harmonia Mundi France, 2009.
- Sirène. Songs by Gustav Mahler, Claude Debussy, Henry Lawes, John Dowland, Joseph Haydn, Franz Schubert, Georges Bizet, Karol Szymanowski, Robert Schumann, Gabriel Fauré, Hugo Wolf, Arthur Honegger, Felix Mendelssohn, Antonín Dvořák. With Eric Schneider (Pianist), piano. DGG 2011.
- Bernd Alois Zimmermann: Initiale. Lieder und frühe Kammermusik. With Cordelia Höfer, Alessandro Cappone, Rachel Schmidt und Trio Berlin. Wergo, 2011.
- Georg Friedrich Händel: Saul. Dresdner Kammerchor, Dresdner Barockorchester, Hans-Christoph Rademann. Carus, Leinfelden-Echterdingen, 2011.
- Enchanted Forest. Arias by Antonio Vivaldi, Georg Friedrich Händel, Henry Purcell, Francesco Cavalli und Claudio Monteverdi. Arcangelo, Jonathan Cohen. DGG 2013.
- Behind the Lines. Songs by Ludwig van Beethoven, Hanns Eisler, Hugo Wolf, Alexey Nikolayevitch Pleshcheyev, Thomas Traill, Charles Edward Ives, Roger Quilter, Michael Cavendish, Franz Schubert, Wolfgang Rihm, Franz Liszt, Robert Schumann, Francis Poulenc, Gustav Mahler, Kurt Weill. With Eric Schneider, piano. DGG 2014
- Serpent & Fire. Arias by Henry Purcell, Christoph Graupner, Antonio Sartorio, Matthew Locke, Daniele da Castrovillari, Georg Friedrich Händel, Johann Adolph Hasse, Francesco Cavalli. Il Giardino Armonico, Giovanni Antonini. Alpha 2015
