= The King's Consort =

The King's Consort is a British period music orchestra founded in 1980 by the English conductor and harpsichordist Robert King (b. 1960, Wombourne). The ensemble has an associated choral group, Choir of The King's Consort. Together, they have made over 100 recordings, from 1987 to 2007 releasing 90 albums on the Hyperion label, and subsequently a further 13 recordings for their own Vivat label, selling over 1,500,000 discs. The orchestra performs concert seasons in the UK and tours internationally.

Their repertoire is primarily from the baroque and early classical periods but has also included late 19th century repertoire as well as contemporary commissions by Michael Finnissy and, more recently, Michael Berkeley and includes recordings and live performances of opera and instrumental music. The ensemble's main performing base has been in London's Wigmore Hall from 1987, and the larger Cadogan Hall for performances that required both the orchestra and the choir. The King's Consort have performed seven times at the BBC Proms including their début in 1991 with Handel’s Music for the Royal Fireworks, Handel’s Deborah in 1993, a programme celebrating the 300th anniversary of the death of Purcell (1995), the Venetian spectacular Lo Sposalizio (1998), The Coronation of King George II, a special programme to celebrate the Golden Jubilee of Queen Elizabeth II (2002), Monteverdi's Vespers of 1610 (2004), and Michael Haydn's Requiem Mass and Mozart's Coronation Mass (2006).

The King's Consort Choir appears on the sound tracks of several films, including The Chronicles of Narnia: The Lion, the Witch and the Wardrobe, Kingdom of Heaven, Pirates of the Caribbean: Dead Man's Chest and The Da Vinci Code.

Amongst their awards was the 2006 BBC Music Magazine Choral Award for their recording of Michael Haydn's Requiem Mass. On their Vivat label, their debut recording, I Was Glad, reached number 1 in the UK Specialist Classical Albums Chart and was a finalist in the 2013 Gramophone Awards. A series of recordings of the music of Purcell were finalists in the Gramophone awards in 2020, 2021 and 2022.

== Discography ==
Label	Catalogue No	Title	Year
Meridian	CDE84126	Handel: Eternal Source of Light	1986
Meridian	CDE84129	Vivaldi: Laudate Pueri	1987
Meridian	CDE84138	Vivaldi: Salve Regina	1987
Hyperion	CDA66253	Blow/Purcell: Countertenor duets	1987
Hyperion	CDA66267	Bach/Telemann: Oboe Concertos	1988
Hyperion	CDA66294	Pergolesi: Stabat Mater	1988
Hyperion	CDA66314	Purcell: Complete Odes, Vol. 1 - Royal & Ceremonial Odes	1988
Hyperion	CDA66278	Telemann: Musique de Table	1989
Hyperion	CDA66288	Purcell: Mr Henry Purcell's Most Admirable Composures	1989
IMP	PCD894	Great Baroque Arias	1989
Hyperion	CDA66315	Handel: Music for Royal Occasions	1989
Hyperion	CDA66326	Bach: Cantatas 54, 169 & 170	1989
Hyperion	CDA66339	Vivaldi: The Four Seasons	1989
Hyperion	CDA66349	Purcell: Complete Odes, Vol. 2 - Hail, bright Cecilia!	1989
Hyperion	CDA66350	Handel: Fireworks Music & Coronation Anthems	1989
Hyperion	CDA66380	Bach: Violin Concertos	1989
Hyperion	CDA66361/2	Handel: Acis & Galatea	1990
Hyperion	CDA66377	Mozart: Epistle Sonatas	1990
Erato	245 014-2	De Lalande: Sacred Music	1990
Hyperion	CDA66398	Schütz: The Christmas Story	1990
Hyperion	CDA66412	Purcell: Complete Odes, Vol. 3 - Fly, bold rebellion	1990
Hyperion	CDA66440	Handel: Italian Duets	1990
Hyperion	CDA66383	Albinoni/Vivaldi: Oboe Concertos	1991
Hyperion	CDA66447	Awake Sweet Love	1991
Hyperion	CDA66456	Purcell: Complete Odes, Vol. 4 - Ye tuneful Muses	1991
Hyperion	CDA66461/2	Handel: Joshua	1991
Hyperion	CDA66474	Couperin: Leçons de Ténèbres	1991
Hyperion	CDA66476	Purcell: Complete Odes, Vol. 5 - Welcome glorious morn	1991
Hyperion	CDA66483	Handel: James Bowman sings Heroic Arias	1991
Hyperion	CDA66494	Purcell: Complete Odes, Vol. 6 - Love's goddess sure	1992
Hyperion	CDA66585	Purcell: Complete Anthems & Services, Vol. 1	1992
Hyperion	CDA66587	Purcell: Complete Odes, Vol. 7 - Yorkshire Feast Song	1992
Hyperion	CDA66598	Purcell: Complete Odes, Vol. 8 - Come ye sons of Art	1992
Hyperion	CDA66609	Purcell: Complete Anthems & Services, Vol. 2	1992
Hyperion	CDA66623	Purcell: Complete Anthems & Services, Vol. 3	1993
Hyperion	CDA66641/2	Handel: Judas Maccabaeus	1993
Hyperion	CDA66644	Purcell: Complete Anthems & Services, Vol. 4	1993
Hyperion	CDA66656	Purcell: Complete Anthems & Services, Vol. 5	1993
Hyperion	CDA66663	Purcell: Complete Services & Anthems, Vol. 6	1993
Hyperion	CDA66841/2	Handel: Deborah	1993
United	88002	Music from the Courts of Europe: London	1993
Hyperion	CDA66751/3	Handel: Ottone	1993
Hyperion	CDA66677	Purcell: Complete Anthems & Services, Vol. 7	1994
Hyperion	CDA66686	Purcell: Complete Anthems & Services, Vol. 8	1994
Hyperion	CDA66693	Purcell: Complete Anthems & Services, Vol. 9	1994
Hyperion	CDA66707	Purcell: Complete Anthems & Services, Vol. 10	1994
Hyperion	CDA66710	Purcell: Complete Secular solo songs, Vol. 1	1994
Hyperion	CDA66716	Purcell: Complete Anthems & Services, Vol. 11	1994
Hyperion	CDA66720	Purcell: Complete Secular solo songs, Vol. 2	1994
Hyperion	CDA66730	Purcell: Complete Secular solo songs, Vol. 3	1994
Hyperion	CDA66769	Vivaldi: Sacred Music Vol. 1	1995
Hyperion	CDA66797	Handel: James Bowman sings English Arias	1995
Hyperion	CDA66881/2	Vivaldi: Complete Cello Sonatas	1995
Hyperion	CDA66961/2	Handel: The Occasional Oratorio	1995
Hyperion	CDA66779	Vivaldi: Sacred Music Vol. 2	1996
Hyperion	CDA66843	Bach: Six Trio Sonatas	1996
Hyperion	CDA66875	Scarlatti/Hasse: Salve Regina	1996
Hyperion	CDA67171/3	Handel: Joseph & his Brethren	1996
Hyperion	CDA66789	Vivaldi: Sacred Music Vol. 3	1997
Hyperion	CDA66967	Handel/Telemann: Water Music	1997
Hyperion	CDA67201/2	Bach: Mass in B minor	1997
Hyperion	CDA67241/2	Handel: Alexander Balus	1997
Hyperion	CDA67281/2	Vivaldi: Sacred Music, Vol. 4 - Juditha Triumphans	1998
Hyperion	CDA67048	Lo Sposalizio	1998
Hyperion	CDA67059	Kuhnau: Sacred Music	1998
Hyperion	CDA67073	Vivaldi: Concerti con molti istromenti	1998
Accenture	CONS1001	The Bright Seraphim	1998
Hyperion	CDA66799	Vivaldi: Sacred Music Vol. 5	1999
Hyperion	CDA67108	Boccherini, Astorga: Stabat Mater	1999
Hyperion	CDA67283/4	Handel: L'Allegro, il Penseroso ed il Moderato	1999
Accenture	CONS1002	The Grand Tour	1999
Hyperion	CDA67160	Knüpfer: Sacred Music	2000
Hyperion	CDA66809	Vivaldi: Sacred Music, Vol. 6	2000
Hyperion	CDA66819	Vivaldi: Sacred Music, Vol. 7	2001
Hyperion	CDA67260	Schelle: Sacred Music	2001
Hyperion	CDA67266	Haydn, Hummel, Hertel Trumpet Concertos	2001
Hyperion	CDA67286	The Coronation of King George, 1727	2001
Hyperion	CDA67298	Handel: The Choice of Hercules	2002
Hyperion	CDA67361/2	Vivaldi: La Senna Festeggiante	2002
Hyperion	CDA66829	Vivaldi: Sacred Music, Vol. 8	2002
Hyperion	CDA66839	Vivaldi: Sacred Music, Vol. 9	2003
Hyperion	CDA67350	Zelenka: Sacred Music	2003
Hyperion	CDA67428	Monteverdi: Sacred Music, Vol. 1	2003
Hyperion	CDA67438	Monteverdi: Sacred Music, Vol. 2	2004
Hyperion	CDA67463	Handel: Ode for St Cecilia's Day	2004
Hyperion	CDA67487	Monteverdi: Sacred Music, Vol. 3	2004
Hyperion	CDA66849	Vivaldi: Sacred Music, Vol. 10	2004
Hyperion	CDA67510	Haydn, Michael: Requiem	2005
Hyperion	CDA 67519	Monteverdi: Sacred Music, Vol. 4	2005
Hyperion	CDA67553	Vivaldi: Cello Concertos	2006
Hyperion	CDA67560	Mozart: Exsultate jubilate	2006
Hyperion	CDA67531/2	Monteverdi: Vespers, 1610	2006
Hyperion	CDA67570	Rossini: Petite Messe solennelle	2006
Hyperion	CDA67627	Handel: German Arias	2007
Vivat	VIVAT 101	I was glad: Sacred Music of Stanford & Parry	2013
Vivat	VIVAT 102	Couperin: Trois Leçons de Ténèbres	2013
Vivat	VIVAT 104	Monteverdi: Heaven and Earth	2013
Vivat	VIVAT 105	Handel: Your tuneful voice	2014
Vivat	VIVAT 106	Purcell: Ten Sonatas in Four Parts	2014
Vivat	VIVAT 110	Purcell: Twelve Sonatas of Three Parts	2015
Vivat	VIVAT 111	Handel-Mendelssohn: Israel in Ägypten	2016
Vivat	VIVAT 113	A Voice from Heaven	2017
Vivat	VIVAT 117	Abbandonata: Handel Italian cantatas	2018
Vivat	VIVAT 118	Elegy: Purcell & Blow duets for countertenors	2019
Vivat	VIVAT 121	Purcell: Royal Odes	2020
Vivat	VIVAT 122	Purcell: Birthday Odes for Queen Mary	2021
Vivat	VIVAT 123	Bach: Six Trio Sonatas	2023

== Collections ==
Label	Catalogue No	Title	Year
Hyperion	KING1	The Music of The King's Consort	1991
Hyperion	KING2	Essential Purcell	1994
Hyperion	KING3	The James Bowman Collection	1996
Hyperion	KING4	The King's Consort Baroque Collection	1997
Hyperion	KING5	Essential Bach	1999
Hyperion	KING6	Essential Handel	2005
Hyperion	KING7	The King's Consort Collection	2005
