= London Haydn Quartet =

British string quartet using period techniques

The London Haydn Quartet is a British string quartet founded in 2000. The quartet has performed at Wigmore Hall, the Concertgebouw, Carnegie Hall, Yamaha and Asahi Halls, the Sydney Opera House and at festivals including Cheltenham, Utrecht, Esterhaza, Bath Mozartfest, Lyon and Granada.

The members of the quartet are Catherine Manson (first violin), Michael Gurevich (second violin), John Crockatt (viola) and Alice Neary (violoncello).

The ensemble's most recent release featuring the Quartet Op. 42, Quartets Op. 77 and The Seven Last Words of Our Saviour on the Cross composed by Franz Josef Haydn marks the final release in a series of recordings of Haydn's complete string quartets.
