= Nicolas Altstaedt =

German-French cellist (born 1982)

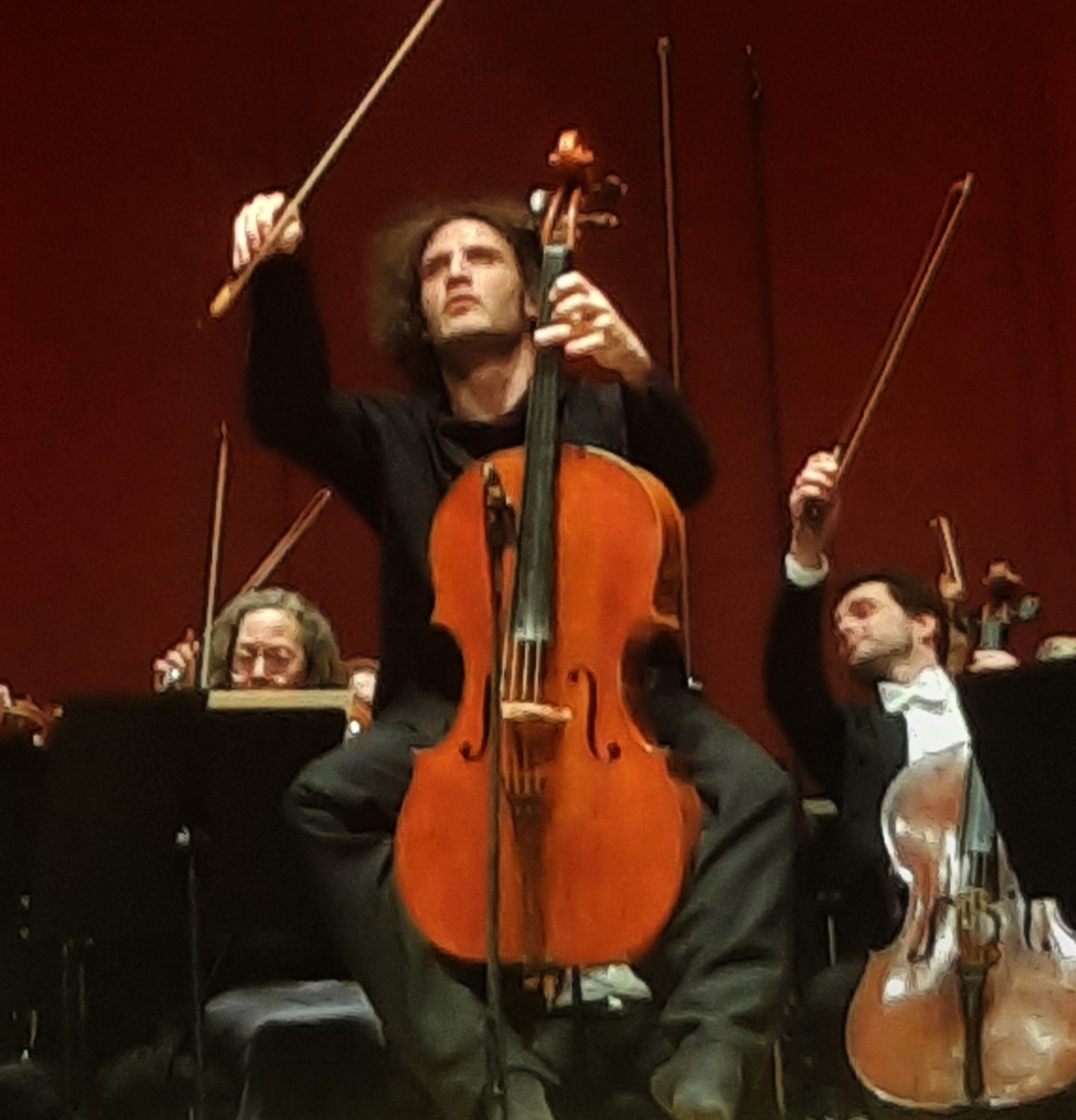
- Nicolas Altstaedt in 2023

Background information
- Born: 1982 (age 43–44); Heidelberg, Germany
- Genre: Classical
- Occupation: Musician
- Instrument: Cello
- Labels: Alpha Classics; GENUIN; Warner Classics; Naxos
- Website: nicolas-altstaedt.com

Nicolas Altstaedt (born 1982) is a German-French cellist. His versatile career incorporates solo performance, chamber music, conducting, and artistic programming, with a repertoire spanning from early music to the contemporary.

== Early life and education ==
Altstaedt was born in Heidelberg, Germany to a family of German and French descent. His older brother, Christoph Altstaedt, is a conductor.

From 1996 to 2001, Altstaedt was a student of Marcio Carneiro at the Hochschule für Musik Detmold and went on to learn with Ivan Monighetti at the City of Basel Music Academy. He was also one of Boris Pergamenschikow’s last students at the Hochschule für Musik Hanns Eisler Berlin, and continued studies later with David Geringas and Eberhard Feltz.

== Career ==
Altstaedt came to international attention as the recipient of the Credit Suisse Young Artist Award in 2010. He subsequently debuted with the Vienna Philharmonic under Gustavo Dudamel at the Lucerne Festival where he performed Schumann’s Cello Concerto.

Altstaedt has performed worldwide with orchestras such as the Symphonieorchester des Bayerischen Rundfunks, Staatskapelle Berlin, Tonhalle-Orchester Zürich, London Philharmonic Orchestra and Munich Philharmonic, NHK Symphony Orchestra, Seoul Philharmonic Orchestra, Sofia Philharmonic Orchestra, National Symphony Orchestra, Detroit Symphony Orchestra, all the BBC Orchestras, Orchestre Philharmonique de Radio France and Orchestre National de France. Conductors with whom he has collaborated with include Sir Roger Norrington, Esa-Pekka Salonen, Sir Neville Marriner, Christoph Eschenbach, François-Xavier Roth, Lahav Shani, and Robin Ticciati.

As a chamber musician, Altstaedt regularly collaborators include Janine Jansen, Vilde Frang, Christian Tetzlaff, Pekka Kuusisto, Barnabás Kelemen, Joshua Bell, Ilya Gringolts, Tabea Zimmermann, Lawrence Power, Antoine Tamestit, Martin Fröst, Alexander Lonquich, Jonathan Cohen, Jean Rondeau and Quatuor Ébène. He also performs regularly at Salzburg Festival, Verbier Festival, Prague Spring Festival, BBC Proms, Rheingau Musik Festival and the Schleswig-Holstein Musik Festival among others.

In 2012 Altstaedt was chosen by Gidon Kremer to become his successor as the new artistic director of the Lockenhaus Chamber Music Festival, and in 2014 Adam Fischer asked him to follow in his footsteps as artistic director of the Haydn Philharmonie, with whom he regularly performs at Vienna Konzerthaus, Esterhazy Festival and will tour both China and Japan in the next season. Altstaedt will be artistic director of the Pfingstfestspiele Ittingen 2019 and 2020.

Altstaedt premieres new music and performs with composers like Wolfgang Rihm, Thomas Ades, Jörg Widmann, Matthias Pintscher, Fazıl Say, Bryce Dessner and Sofia Gubaidulina.

Altstaedt's recording of CPE Bach Concertos on Hyperion with Arcangelo and Jonathan Cohen received the BBC Music Magazine Concerto Award 2017. His latest recording – Four Cities – a recital program of works by Say, Debussy, Shostakovich and Janáček with Fazıl Say was released on Warner Classics received the Edison Klassiek 2017. Altstaedt received the Musikpreis der Stadt Duisburg 2018. He was a BBC New Generation Artist 2010–2012 and a recipient of the "Borletti Buitoni Trust Fellowship" in 2009. Altstaedt plays a cello by G.B. Guadagnini of 1749.

In 2022 Altstaedt was – with Friends – the lead star at the famous Prinsengrachtconcert in Amsterdam.

== Selected discography ==
- Wilhelm Killmayer & Robert Schumann: Works for cello and piano with José Gallardo (GENUIN, )
- Carl Philipp Emanuel Bach: Cello Concertos with Arcangelo & Jonathan Cohen (conductor) (Hyperion Records, CDA68112, 2016)
- 4 Cities: Recital CD with Fazıl Say (Warner Classics, )
