= Iestyn Davies =

British classical countertenor (born 1979)

Iestyn Davies MBE FRAM
- Born: 16 September 1979 (age 47); York, England
- Genres: Opera, Baroque music
- Occupation: Singer
- Website: iestyndavies.com

Iestyn Davies MBE FRAM (born 16 September 1979) is a British classical countertenor, active internationally as a Baroque music soloist and opera performer.

== Education and background ==
Davies was born in York, England, and first studied piano and recorder. He was mentored in his early years by his father, Ioan Davies.

From the age of eight he sang as a boy treble in the Choir of St John's College, Cambridge, progressing to countertenor in his teens at Wells Cathedral School.

He returned to St John's College as a choral scholar to read Archaeology and Anthropology.

Davies' father, Ioan, was also a member of St John's College, and the founding cellist with the Fitzwilliam Quartet—founded by Cambridge students.

He gained his diploma from the Royal Academy of Music, which later appointed him an associate.

In 2004 he won the Audience Prize at the London Handel Singing Competition, and in 2010 was named "Young Artist of the Year" by the Royal Philharmonic Society.

== Performance ==
Davies's opera career to date has included the role of in Monteverdi's L'incoronazione di Poppea for both Zurich Opera and Glyndebourne Festival Opera, and in Handel's Partenope he has sung both Arsace for New York City Opera and Armindo for English National Opera. He has sung Oberon in Britten's A Midsummer Night's Dream for Houston Grand Opera, Apollo in Britten's Death in Venice for English National Opera and Hamor in Handel's Jephtha for both Welsh National Opera and Opéra National de Bordeaux.

In 2010 he sang Creonte in Agostino Steffani's Niobe at the Royal Opera House, Covent Garden. In 2011, he sang the part of Unulfo in Handel's Rodelinda at the Metropolitan Opera in New York. He returned to the Met in 2020 in another Handel opera, Agrippina, in which he sang the role of Ottone.

He has appeared in concert at Teatro alla Scala with Gustavo Dudamel, at the Concertgebouw, Amsterdam, and the Tonhalle, Zurich, with Ton Koopman, at the Barbican, the Théâtre des Champs-Élysées and Lincoln Center, and at the Royal Albert Hall in the BBC Proms.

He has worked with many leading orchestras, including the Orchestra of the Age of Enlightenment, Academy of Ancient Music, Scottish Chamber Orchestra, the Hallé Orchestra, the King's Consort, Northern Sinfonia, the English Concert, the Akademie für Alte Musik Berlin, Retrospect Ensemble, the Parley of Instruments, Il Complesso Barocco, the Gabrieli Consort and Players, the Minnesota Orchestra, London Philharmonic Orchestra, Britten Sinfonia, Concerto Köln, Concerto Copenhagen, Ensemble Matheus, Fretwork and the Bournemouth Symphony Orchestra.

Leading interpreters with whom Davies has collaborated include conductors Rinaldo Alessandrini, Philippe Bender, Harry Bicket, Ivor Bolton, Frans Brüggen, Harry Christophers, Stephen Cleobury, Laurence Cummings, Christian Curnyn, Alan Curtis, Steven Devine, Richard Egarr, John Eliot Gardiner, Edward Gardner, Jane Glover, Paul Goodwin, Emmanuelle Haïm, Matthew Halls, Nikolaus Harnoncourt, Edward Higginbottom, David Hill, Benedict Hoffnung, Christopher Hogwood, Peter Holman, Robert King, Nicholas Kraemer, Stephen Layton, Iain Leddingham, Charles Mackerras, Paul McCreesh, Kenneth Montgomery, Lars Ulrik Mortensen, Kent Nagano, Donald Nally, James O'Donnell, Enrico Onofri, Daniel Reuss, Jeffrey Skidmore, Jean-Christophe Spinosi, Charles Stewart, Patrick Summers, Elizabeth Wallfisch, Alison Balsom and Dominic Wheeler, and recitalists Julius Drake, Mark Padmore, Philip Langridge and Roger Vignoles.

Davies was the guest soloist in Leonard Bernstein's Chichester Psalms at the Last Night of the Proms at the Royal Albert Hall in September 2013.

He sang his first full operatic performance for La Scala in Death in Venice. In London, he sang the role of Oberon in A Midsummer Night's Dream for English National Opera.

Davies performed the singing voice of Farinelli in Farinelli and the King for a 16-week run at the Belasco Theatre on Broadway. The production opened in December 2017, and featured Mark Rylance as King Philippe V of Spain. Davies reprised the role at Shakespeare's Globe and in London's West End.

In April 2021 Davies sang with English National Opera in a socially distanced performance of Handel's Messiah, staged at the London Coliseum and conducted from the harpsichord by Laurence Cummings. It was broadcast by BBC Two.

In February 2022, Davies sang in a performance of Bach's Mass in B minor with the Philharmonia Baroque Orchestra under the direction of Richard Egarr.

In 2024 he made his Australian debut, starring alongside the Sydney Dance Company in the Australian Chamber Orchestra's national touring production Silence & Rapture. He also led Opera Australia's production of Orfeo ed Euridice later that year.

== Honours ==
Davies was made a Fellow of the Royal Academy of Music in 2012.

He was appointed Member of the Order of the British Empire (MBE) in the 2017 New Year Honours for services to music.

== Discography ==
=== Solo and Duet Recitals ===
| Release Year | Music Label | Recording Title | Composer | Conductor | Artist / Group | Notes |
|---|---|---|---|---|---|---|
| 2012 | Hyperion | Arias for Guadagni | Various (incl. Handel, Gluck, Hasse) | Jonathan Cohen | Arcangelo | Davies provides solo countertenor vocals celebrating Gaetano Guadagni. |
| 2012 | Warner Classics | Sound the Trumpet: Royal Music of Purcell & Handel | Henry Purcell, George Frideric Handel | Trevor Pinnock | The English Concert, Alison Balsom | Davies features in countertenor duets with the trumpet. |
| 2013 | Wigmore Hall Live | Britten: Five Canticles | Benjamin Britten | | Iestyn Davies, Allan Clayton, Mark Padmore, Julius Drake | Davies performs Canticle II: Abraham and Isaac and Canticle IV: Journey of the Magi. |
| 2014 | Hyperion | The Art of Melancholy: Songs by John Dowland | John Dowland | | Iestyn Davies, Thomas Dunford | Davies is the solo countertenor. |
| 2014 | Wigmore Hall Live | Flow My Tears: Songs for Lute, Viol and Voice | Various (incl. John Dowland) | | Iestyn Davies, Thomas Dunford, Jonathan Manson | Davies is the solo countertenor. |
| 2014 | Wigmore Hall Live | Arise, my muse | Various (incl. Henry Purcell) | Richard Egarr (harpsichord) | Iestyn Davies, Richard Egarr & friends | Davies is the solo countertenor across this recital disc of English songs and anthems. |
| 2014 | Vivat | Your Tuneful Voice: Handel Oratorio Arias | George Frideric Handel | Robert King | Iestyn Davies, Carolyn Sampson, The King's Consort | Davies provides solo countertenor vocals. |
| 2016 | Signum Classics | The Complete Songs of Fauré, Vol. 2 | Gabriel Fauré | | Iestyn Davies, Malcolm Martineau | Davies is one of the featured soloists performing selected Fauré mélodies. |
| 2016 | Hyperion | Bach: Cantatas Nos 54, 82 & 170 | Johann Sebastian Bach | Jonathan Cohen | Arcangelo, Iestyn Davies | Davies is the sole vocal soloist performing the three solo alto cantatas. |
| 2017 | BIS | Lost is my quiet: Duets and Solo Songs | Henry Purcell, Felix Mendelssohn, etc. | | Carolyn Sampson, Iestyn Davies, Joseph Middleton | Davies sings countertenor solos and duets alongside soprano Carolyn Sampson. |
| 2019 | Signum Classics | If: Michael Nyman & Henry Purcell | Michael Nyman, Henry Purcell | | Iestyn Davies, Fretwork | Davies is the featured solo countertenor accompanied by viol consort Fretwork. |
| 2020 | Vivat | Elegy: Countertenor Duets by Purcell & Blow | Henry Purcell, John Blow | Jonathan Cohen | Iestyn Davies, James Hall, The King's Consort | Davies sings countertenor duets alongside James Hall. |
| 2020 | Apple Music | Eight Songs From Isolation | Various | Oliver Zeffman | Academy of St Martin in the Fields, various soloists | Davies sings one of the newly commissioned contemporary solo songs recorded during lockdown. |
| 2021 | Signum Classics | Lamento | Johann Christoph Bach, Heinrich Schütz, etc. | | Iestyn Davies, Fretwork | Davies performs 17th-century German laments as the solo countertenor. |
| 2022 | Pentatone | Handel's Unsung Heroes 2 | George Frideric Handel | David Bates | La Nuova Musica | Davies performs featured alto arias by Handel. |
| 2022 | Warner Classics | Eternal Heaven | George Frideric Handel | Philippe Jaroussky | Ensemble Artaserse, Iestyn Davies, Philippe Jaroussky | Davies sings countertenor duets alongside Philippe Jaroussky. |
| 2023 | Signum Classics | Divine Music: An English Songbook | Various (John Dowland, Thomas Campion, etc.) | | Iestyn Davies, Fretwork | Davies is the solo countertenor performing English consort songs. |

=== Opera and Oratorio Works ===
| Release Year | Music Label | Recording Title | Composer | Conductor | Artist / Group | Notes |
|---|---|---|---|---|---|---|
| 2006 | Naxos | Handel: Messiah (1751 Version) | George Frideric Handel | Edward Higginbottom | Choir of New College, Oxford, Academy of Ancient Music | Davies is the principal countertenor/alto soloist. |
| 2006 | Naxos | Vivaldi: Griselda | Antonio Vivaldi | Kevin Mallon | Aradia Ensemble | Davies sings the role of Corrado. |
| 2008 | Hyperion | Handel: Chandos Anthems | George Frideric Handel | Stephen Layton | Choir of Trinity College, Cambridge, Academy of Ancient Music | Davies is the featured alto soloist. |
| 2008 | Hyperion | Łukaszewski: Via Crucis | Paweł Łukaszewski | Stephen Layton | Polyphony, Britten Sinfonia | Davies provides the featured countertenor solos. |
| 2009 | Opus Arte | Purcell: Dido and Aeneas (DVD) | Henry Purcell | Christopher Hogwood | The Royal Opera, The Royal Ballet, Orchestra of the Age of Enlightenment | Davies sings the role of the Spirit. |
| 2009 | Hyperion | Handel: Messiah | George Frideric Handel | Stephen Layton | Polyphony, Britten Sinfonia | Davies features as the primary countertenor soloist. |
| 2009 | Decca | Handel: Partenope (DVD) | George Frideric Handel | Lars Ulrik Mortensen | Concerto Copenhagen, Royal Danish Opera | Davies sings the principal role of Arsace. |
| 2010 | Chandos | Handel: Flavio, re de' Longobardi | George Frideric Handel | Christian Curnyn | Early Opera Company | Davies sings the title role of Flavio. |
| 2013 | Hyperion | Bach: St John Passion | Johann Sebastian Bach | Stephen Layton | Polyphony, Orchestra of the Age of Enlightenment | Davies is the featured alto soloist. |
| 2013 | Hyperion | Handel: Chandos Anthems, Vol. 2 | George Frideric Handel | Stephen Layton | Choir of Trinity College, Cambridge, Academy of Ancient Music | Davies is the featured alto soloist. |
| 2013 | Les Arts Florissants | Handel: Belshazzar | George Frideric Handel | William Christie | Les Arts Florissants | Davies sings the principal role of Cyrus. |
| 2013 | Hyperion | Bach: Christmas Oratorio | Johann Sebastian Bach | Stephen Layton | Choir of Trinity College, Cambridge, Orchestra of the Age of Enlightenment | Davies is the featured alto soloist. |
| 2013 | Deutsche Grammophon | Adès: The Tempest (DVD) | Thomas Adès | Thomas Adès | The Metropolitan Opera Orchestra and Chorus | Davies sings the role of Trinculo. |
| 2015 | Opus Arte | Steffani: Niobe, Regina di Tebe | Agostino Steffani | Thomas Hengelbrock | Balthasar-Neumann-Ensemble | Davies sings the role of Creonte. |
| 2016 | Opus Arte | Handel: Saul (Glyndebourne) | George Frideric Handel | Ivor Bolton | Orchestra of the Age of Enlightenment, Glyndebourne Chorus | Davies sings the principal role of David. |
| 2017 | AAM Records | Bach: St John Passion (Live) | Johann Sebastian Bach | Richard Egarr | Academy of Ancient Music | Davies is the alto soloist. |
| 2019 | Erato | Adès: The Exterminating Angel (DVD) | Thomas Adès | Thomas Adès | The Metropolitan Opera Orchestra and Chorus | Davies sings the role of Francisco de Ávila. |
| 2019 | Pentatone | Gluck: Orfeo ed Euridice | Christoph Willibald Gluck | David Bates | La Nuova Musica, Iestyn Davies, Sophie Bevan | Davies sings the principal role of Orfeo. |
| 2020 | Hyperion | Handel: Israel in Egypt / Schütz: Musikalische Exequien | George Frideric Handel, Heinrich Schütz | Robert King, Richard Egarr | The King's Consort, Scottish Chamber Orchestra | Davies features as the alto soloist. |
| 2021 | Challenge Records | Buxtehude: Membra Jesu Nostri | Dieterich Buxtehude | Ton Koopman | Amsterdam Baroque / Phantasm | Davies is the alto soloist. |
| 2021 | Linn Records | Handel: Rodelinda | George Frideric Handel | Harry Bicket | The English Concert | Davies sings the principal role of Bertarido. |

=== Choral, Ensemble, and Soundtrack Works ===
| Release Year | Music Label | Recording Title | Composer | Conductor | Artist / Group / Choir | Notes |
|---|---|---|---|---|---|---|
| 1988 | Chandos | Charpentier: Messe de minuit pour Noël / Poulenc: Motets | Marc-Antoine Charpentier, Francis Poulenc | George Guest | Choir of St John's College, Cambridge, City of London Sinfonia | Iestyn Davies likely features as a treble chorister. |
| 1995 | Chandos | Purcell: Dioclesian / Timon of Athens | Henry Purcell | Richard Hickox | Collegium Musicum 90, Pierpont Morgan Library Choir | Iestyn Davies likely participated as a boy treble/chorister. |
| 2000 | Naxos | Rubbra: Nine Tenebrae Motets | Edmund Rubbra | Christopher Robinson | Choir of St John's College, Cambridge | Davies sings in the choir as a choral scholar. |
| 2000 | Naxos | Tavener: Song for Athene / Svyati | John Tavener | Christopher Robinson | Choir of St John's College, Cambridge | Davies sings in the choir as a choral scholar. |
| 2001 | Naxos | Miserere / Choral Works | Various (incl. Allegri) | Christopher Robinson | Choir of St John's College, Cambridge | Iestyn Davies was a choral scholar/member of the choir during this recording period. |
| 2002 | Naxos | English Choral Music: William Walton | William Walton | Christopher Robinson | Choir of St John's College, Cambridge | Davies features as a choral scholar in the choir. |
| 2002 | Naxos | Finzi: Lo, the full, final sacrifice | Gerald Finzi | Christopher Robinson | Choir of St John's College, Cambridge | Davies sings in the choir as a choral scholar. |
| 2003 | Naxos | Kenneth Leighton: Sacred Choral Music | Kenneth Leighton | Christopher Robinson | Choir of St John's College, Cambridge | Davies sang in the choir (tenor/countertenor) during his time as a choral scholar. |
| 2004 | RCA / ECM | Tavener: The Veil of the Temple | John Tavener | Stephen Layton | The Temple Church Choir, Holst Singers | Davies features in the choral ensemble. |
| 2005 | Sony Classical | Kingdom of Heaven (Original Motion Picture Soundtrack) | Harry Gregson-Williams | Harry Gregson-Williams | The Bach Choir, Hollywood Studio Symphony | Davies provides the featured countertenor solo vocals, notably on the track "Ibelin". |
| 2010 | Naxos | Nesciens Mater: Choral Works | Jean Mouton, various | Various | Various Choirs (incl. Choir of St John's College, Cambridge) | Compilation album; features Davies in his earlier collegiate choral recordings. |
| 2015 | NMC Recordings | Finnissy: Maldon & Other Choral Works | Michael Finnissy | James Weeks | EXAUDI Vocal Ensemble | Davies features in the ensemble. |
| 2019 | Decca | Jenkins: Miserere - Songs of Redemption | Karl Jenkins | Stephen Layton | Polyphony, Britten Sinfonia | Davies provides featured countertenor solos. |
| 2021 | Vivat | Purcell: Royal Odes | Henry Purcell | Robert King | The King's Consort | Davies is a featured alto soloist in the odes. |
| 2021 | Hollywood Records | The Last Duel (Original Motion Picture Soundtrack) | Harry Gregson-Williams | Harry Gregson-Williams | Hollywood Studio Symphony | Davies provides the featured countertenor vocal on "Celui que je désire". |
| 2022 | Vivat | Purcell: Birthday Odes for Queen Mary | Henry Purcell | Robert King | The King's Consort | Davies is a featured alto soloist. |
| 2022 | Harmonia Mundi | Rolling River: American Choral | Traditional, Various | Graham Ross | Choir of Clare College, Cambridge | Davies features as a guest soloist, notably on the track "Beautiful River". |

== Reviews ==
- The Guardian (2010)
- Time Out (2010)
- The New York Times (2010)
- The Independent (2009)
- Press clippings
