= Anselmo Bellosio =

Italian luther (1743–1793)

Anselmo Bellosio (1743 – 1793) was an Italian luthier. He took over the workshop in Venice of Giorgio Serafin in 1779, having studied under the tuition of Giorgio's uncle Sanctus Seraphin. Marco Antonio Cerin was among his students. His violins are typically Venetian in shape and varnish.

His violins have been played by several violinists including Alina Ibragimova and Nigel Kennedy.
