= Matthias Goerne =

German opera singer (born 1967)

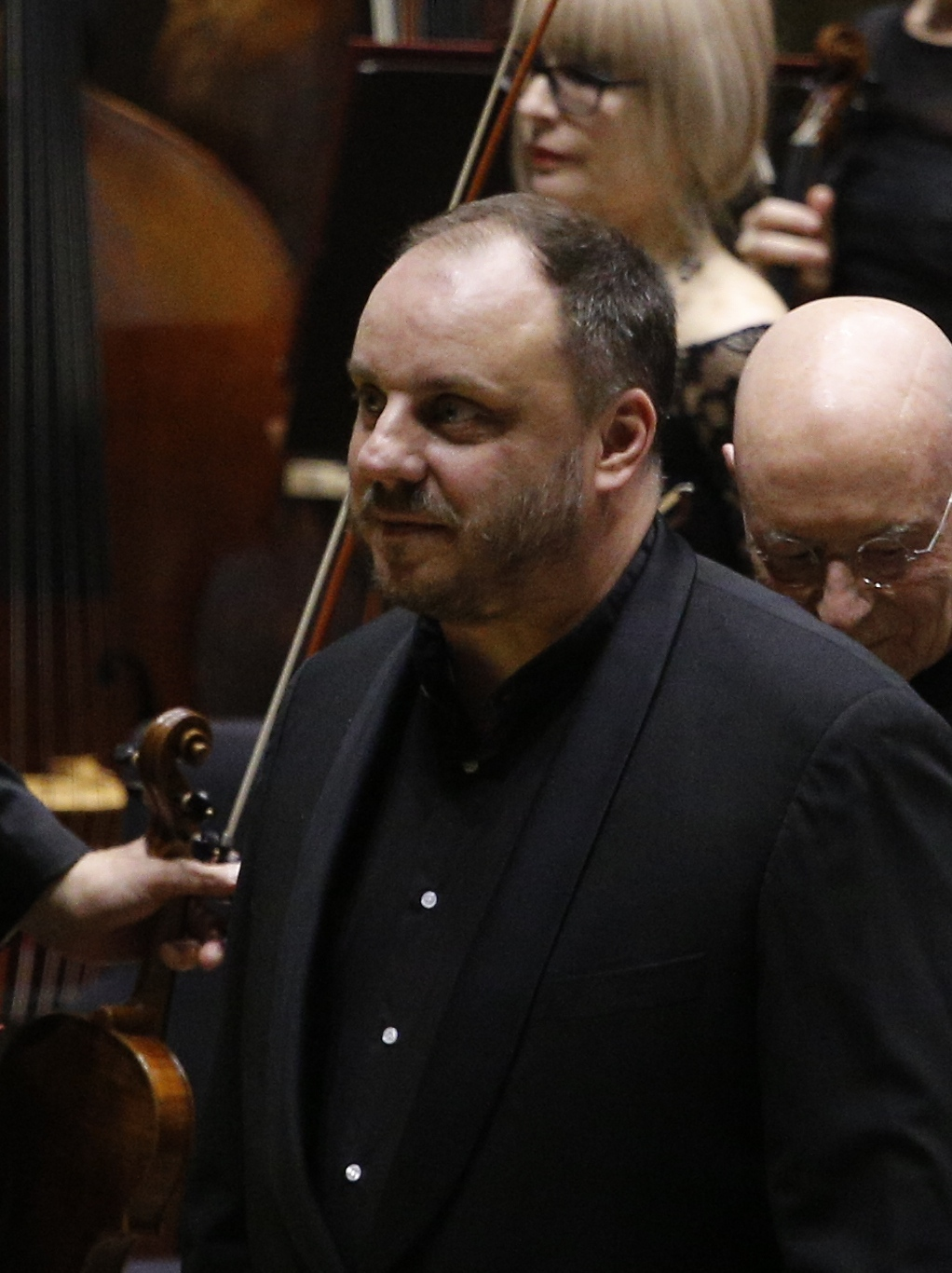
- Born: Matthias Goerne; 31 March 1967 (age 59); Weimar, East Germany
- Education: University of Music and Theatre Leipzig
- Occupations: Opera/lieder singer (baritone); singing teacher
- Years active: 1997–

Matthias Goerne (born 31 March 1967) is a German baritone. He has performed and recorded extensively, both on the opera stage and in Lieder settings. Goerne has been referred to as "today's leading interpreter of German art songs" by the Chicago Tribune, while the Boston Globe describes him as "one of the greatest singers performing today".

Prominent opera stages on which Goerne has appeared include the Royal Opera House in London, Teatro Real in Madrid, Paris National Opera, Vienna State Opera, and the Metropolitan Opera in New York City. His roles include Wagner's Wolfram in Tannhäuser, Amfortas in Parsifal, and Kurwenal in Tristan und Isolde, Orest in Elektra by Richard Strauss and the title roles in Alban Berg's Wozzeck, Bartók's Bluebeard's Castle, Hindemith's Mathis der Maler and Reimann's Lear.

In lieder recitals, he has worked with pianists including Alfred Brendel, Vladimir Ashkenazy, Daniil Trifonov, Seong-Jin Cho and Eric Schneider.

== Biography ==
=== Early life and education ===
Goerne was born in Weimar. He grew up in a musical environment; his father was a dramaturge and director at several play theaters in Dresden. His first instrument was the cello, but he soon switched to singing. At the age of 9 he determined to become a professional singer. He sang in the children's choirs of several of his father's theatre productions, including Carmen and La Bohème. From the age of 18 to 22 he studied voice in Leipzig under Hans-Joachim Beyer. He would later refer to Beyer as being his most important teacher and as the one who enabled him to start winning competitions. In 1989, he won second prize in the Robert Schumann Competition and first prizes in the Salomon-Lindberg and Hugo Wolf competitions. Two years into his studies, he won a singing competition in West Berlin. The head of the jury, composer and pianist Aribert Reimann, introduced him to Dietrich Fischer-Dieskau, whom Goerne considered his idol and the greatest artist he knew. He took singing lessons from Fischer-Dieskau for three years and then from Elisabeth Schwarzkopf for two years.

=== Career ===
==== 1990s ====
Goerne made his professional debut in Leipzig in 1990, invited by Kurt Masur to sing in Bach's St. Matthew Passion. He made his debut at the Salzburg Festival in 1997 as Papageno in Mozart's Die Zauberflöte.

==== 2000s ====
From 2001 through 2005, Goerne taught as an honorary professor of song interpretation at the Robert Schumann Hochschule in Düsseldorf. In 2001, he was appointed an honorary member of the Royal Academy of Music in London.

==== 2010s ====
From the late 2000s to 2014, Goerne recorded a selection of Schubert lieder, The Goerne/Schubert Edition, on 12 CDs, for Harmonia Mundi. The final volume was published in December 2014 and received the highest rating in BBC Music magazine and a Diapason d'Or. His recording of Hanns Eisler lieder was awarded a Diapason d'Or de l'Année the same year.

He toured in the 2011/12 season with the Vienna Philharmonic with appearances at the Vienna State Opera and the Saito Kinen Festival, performing the title role of Bartók's Bluebeard's Castle conducted by Seiji Ozawa. He gave lieder recitals with Christoph Eschenbach and Leif Ove Andsnes in Paris, Vienna and at New York's Carnegie Hall.

From 2012 to 2013, Goerne appeared as Wolfram in Wagner's Tannhäuser at the Bavarian State Opera and as Amfortas in Wagner's Parsifal in a concert performance at the Teatro Real in Madrid. Concert highlights included appearances with the Orchestre de Paris (Bluebeard), Berlin Philharmonic (War Requiem), Leipzig Gewandhaus Orchestra (Beethoven’s Ninth Symphony), Filarmonica del Teatro alla Scala (Mahler Lieder), Israel Philharmonic, and San Francisco Symphony (Wagner arias) as well as song recitals with Pierre-Laurent Aimard and Schubert cycles with Christoph Eschenbach at the Vienna Musikverein.

==== 2020s ====
In 2020, Goerne signed with Deutsche Grammophon for a trilogy of Lieder albums released in 2020, 2021 and 2022 with pianists Jan Lisiecki, Seong-Jin Cho and Daniil Trifonov, respectively.

In 2021, German composer Detlev Glanert composed a setting for voice and orchestra of Eichendorff poem "Der Einsiedler" (The hermit) especially for Goerne, who performed it with the Concertgebouworkest conducted by Jaap van Zweden to critical acclaim.

He made his directorial debut with a production of Salome at the Opéra National du Capitole in Toulouse in May 2026 with Nicole Chevalier in the title role.

=== Personal life ===
Goerne adopted a son who was born in 1989, and a daughter born in 2000. His first marriage ended in divorce. He was said to have smoked cigarettes "a lot" early in life, but later stopped after noting the detrimental effects on his voice. Goerne is not religious, although he does "have beliefs".

== Views on music ==
Goerne has criticized the modern day relevance of opera productions, going so far as to state that most popular operas should not be performed at all anymore because they have become outdated, no longer having "enough substance for the questions posed by our society".

He has expressed a distaste for most contemporary art music from a vocal perspective, claiming that its focus on using the extremes of the voice, "singing very high or very low, very loud or very quietly", is not conducive to the expression of thoughts and feelings. Furthermore, he opines that this style of vocal writing makes pieces become "boring and one-dimensional".

Goerne has expressed a preference for working with solo pianists over pianists who specialize in accompaniment, citing the formers' superior artistic vision and technical proficiency.

== Awards and honors ==
Goerne is a recipient of the Wigmore Hall, London, medal.

Year	Award	Result
1999	Grammy Awards	Nominated
2000	Grammy Awards	Nominated
2001	Grammy Awards	Nominated
2013	Edison Vocal Soloist Award	Won
2014	BBC Music Magazine Vocal Award	Nominated
2014	Diapason d'Or	Won
2014	ICMA Awards	Won
2017	BBC Music Magazine Vocal Award	Won
2017	Gramophone Solo Vocal Award	Won
2017	ECHO Klassik Male Singer	Won
2020	Edison Vocal Soloist Award	Won
2020	Diapason d'Or	Won
2020	Grammy Awards	Nominated
