= Robert King (conductor) =

British harpsichordist and composer (1960-)

- Born: 27 June 1960 (age 66); Wombourne, Staffordshire, England
- Education: St John's College, University of Cambridge
- Occupations: Conductor; Harpsichordist; Editor; Author
- Criminal charge: Indecent assault
- Criminal penalty: Imprisonment for three years, nine months
- Criminal status: Released 2009
- Website: www.robertking.eu

Robert King (born 27 June 1960 in Wombourne) is an English conductor, harpsichordist, organist, editor and author. His career has concentrated on period performance of classical music, in particular from the baroque and early modern eras with the period instrument orchestra he founded in 1980, The King's Consort. In 2007, he was convicted of indecent assault: in 2009, he resumed his musical career.

== Career ==
As a youth, he was a member of the Choir of St John's College, Cambridge. He read music at St John's College, Cambridge from 1979-82 and in 1980 won the Brian Runnett Organ Prize. As conductor and artistic director of The King's Consort since 1980, King has made more than 100 recordings, mostly for Hyperion Records.

He has worked as a conductor with orchestras in Europe and North America, including the Seattle, Houston, New World, Oregon, Detroit, Atlanta, Minnesota, WDR and NDR Symphony Orchestras, the Bergen Philharmonic, the Munich Radio Orchestra, Zurich Chamber Orchestra, Danish National Radio Orchestra, Orchestre Philharmonique de Monte Carlo, the Orchestra della RAI Torino, Orchestra Sinfonica Giuseppe Verdi di Milano, the Orquesta Sinfónica de Tenerife, Orquesta Ciudad de Barcelona, Real Filharmonia de Galicia, Real Orquesta Sinfónica de Sevilla and the Orquesta e Coro Ciudad de Madrid. As a choral conductor, King has worked with the Nederlands Kamerkoor, Orfeo Catala, Orfeón Donostiarra, Swiss Radio Choir and the BBC Singers. Operatic work has included Handel Ottone in Japan and the UK, Handel Ezio in Paris, Purcell The Indian Queen in the UK and Germany, Purcell The Fairy Queen in Spain and Britain and Gluck Armide for Buxton Festival. He has written and presented for the BBC, been artistic director of music festivals in Sweden, Germany, and the UK, and contributed to the scores of a number of Hollywood films including Pirates of the Caribbean, Shrek 2, Flushed Away, and The Da Vinci Code.

Besides his work in the field of baroque music, King has conducted a wide spread of classical and early romantic works, symphonic and choral, with a particular focus on the music of Mozart, Haydn and Mendelssohn, and a continuing specialisation in early twentieth century English composers, notably the works of Vaughan Williams, Stanford and Parry.

Having recorded mostly for Hyperion Records from 1987 until 2007, since 2012 he has recorded for the Vivat label, whose debut recording, I Was Glad, reached number 1 in the UK Specialist Classical Albums Chart and was a finalist in the 2013 Gramophone Awards. A series of recordings of the music of Purcell were finalists in the Gramophone awards in 2020, 2021 and 2022.

From 1996-2002 King was a director of PAMRA (Performing Artists Media Rights Association), a UK not-for-profit organisation set up in 1996 as a result of EU directive 92/100/EEC, Article 8(2), which gave performers the right to receive "equitable remuneration". Prior to this, “non-featured artists” (including backing musicians, orchestral players and choral singers) did not receive royalties when their performances were broadcast or played in public. Involved in complex rights negotiations over his six years on the board, King was one of two PAMRA directors to sign the society’s first reciprocal international agreement, that with the Dutch collection society SENA, opening the door to dozens of similar international agreements. By 2002 PAMRA had more than 15,000 members and was paying out millions of pounds in royalties to rank-and-file musicians.

A published author and editor of many scores, principally of baroque music, King wrote a monograph, ‘Henry Purcell - "A Greater Musical Genius England Never had"‘ (London: Thames & Hudson) published in 1995, coinciding with the 300th anniversary of the composer's death in 1695. In 2010 and 2011, two volumes of English church music edited by King were published by Oxford University Press, followed in 2012 and 2014 by editions of choral works by Emanuele d'Astorga and Henry Purcell. A further 90 editions of choral and instrumental music, predominantly from the baroque period but also including substantial choral works by Felix Mendelssohn and Charles Villiers Stanford, have been published by The King’s Consort.

== Personal life ==
In 2007, King was convicted of fourteen charges of historical indecent assault of five males, three under the age of sixteen, between 1983 and 1994; he was acquitted on another charge. King received a sentence of 3 years 9 months and was placed on the sex offenders' register. During the case, King pleaded "not guilty": when questioned if the boys were lying, he replied "absolutely". Following his sentence, King was not prohibited from working with children. In 2013, commenting after criticism for his taking part in a charity fundraising concert, King stated that he had 'accepted my sentence, and have paid my debt to society'.

King is married, with two children.

== Published works ==
- Henry Purcell - "A Greater Musical Genius England Never had". London: Thames & Hudson, 1995. ISBN 0-500-01625-9
- English Church Music. Volume 1: Anthems and Motets. Oxford: Oxford University Press, 2010. ISBN 978-0-19-336841-5
- English Church Music. Volume 2: Canticles and Responses. Oxford: Oxford University Press, 2011. ISBN 978-0-19-336844-6
- Emanuele d’Astorga: Stabat Mater. Oxford: Oxford University Press, 2012. ISBN 978-0-19-338815-4
- Henry Purcell: Te Deum and Jubilate Deo. Oxford: Oxford University Press, 2014. ISBN 978-0-19-338589-4

== Discography ==
Founded in 1980 by Robert King, the period instrument orchestra and choir The King's Consort has made more than 100 recordings under King's direction, winning many international awards and selling more than 1,500,000 copies.

Label	Catalogue No	Title	Year
Meridian	CDE84126	Handel: Eternal Source of Light	1986
Meridian	CDE84129	Vivaldi: Laudate Pueri	1987
Meridian	CDE84138	Vivaldi: Salve Regina	1987
Hyperion	CDA66253	Blow/Purcell: Countertenor duets	1987
Hyperion	CDA66267	Bach/Telemann: Oboe Concertos	1988
Hyperion	CDA66294	Pergolesi: Stabat Mater	1988
Hyperion	CDA66314	Purcell: Complete Odes, Vol. 1 - Royal & Ceremonial Odes	1988
Hyperion	CDA66278	Telemann: Musique de Table	1989
Hyperion	CDA66288	Purcell: Mr Henry Purcell's Most Admirable Composures	1989
IMP	PCD894	Great Baroque Arias	1989
Hyperion	CDA66315	Handel: Music for Royal Occasions	1989
Hyperion	CDA66326	Bach: Cantatas 54, 169 & 170	1989
Hyperion	CDA66339	Vivaldi: The Four Seasons	1989
Hyperion	CDA66349	Purcell: Complete Odes, Vol. 2 - Hail, bright Cecilia!	1989
Hyperion	CDA66350	Handel: Fireworks Music & Coronation Anthems	1989
Hyperion	CDA66380	Bach: Violin Concertos	1989
Hyperion	CDA66361/2	Handel: Acis & Galatea	1990
Hyperion	CDA66377	Mozart: Epistle Sonatas	1990
Erato	245 014-2	De Lalande: Sacred Music	1990
Hyperion	CDA66398	Schütz: The Christmas Story	1990
Hyperion	CDA66412	Purcell: Complete Odes, Vol. 3 - Fly, bold rebellion	1990
Hyperion	CDA66440	Handel: Italian Duets	1990
Hyperion	CDA66383	Albinoni/Vivaldi: Oboe Concertos	1991
Hyperion	CDA66447	Awake Sweet Love	1991
Hyperion	CDA66456	Purcell: Complete Odes, Vol. 4 - Ye tuneful Muses	1991
Hyperion	CDA66461/2	Handel: Joshua	1991
Hyperion	CDA66474	Couperin: Leçons de Ténèbres	1991
Hyperion	CDA66476	Purcell: Complete Odes, Vol. 5 - Welcome glorious morn	1991
Hyperion	CDA66483	Handel: James Bowman sings Heroic Arias	1991
Hyperion	CDA66494	Purcell: Complete Odes, Vol. 6 - Love's goddess sure	1992
Hyperion	CDA66585	Purcell: Complete Anthems & Services, Vol. 1	1992
Hyperion	CDA66587	Purcell: Complete Odes, Vol. 7 - Yorkshire Feast Song	1992
Hyperion	CDA66598	Purcell: Complete Odes, Vol. 8 - Come ye sons of Art	1992
Hyperion	CDA66609	Purcell: Complete Anthems & Services, Vol. 2	1992
Hyperion	CDA66623	Purcell: Complete Anthems & Services, Vol. 3	1993
Hyperion	CDA66641/2	Handel: Judas Maccabaeus	1993
Hyperion	CDA66644	Purcell: Complete Anthems & Services, Vol. 4	1993
Hyperion	CDA66656	Purcell: Complete Anthems & Services, Vol. 5	1993
Hyperion	CDA66663	Purcell: Complete Services & Anthems, Vol. 6	1993
Hyperion	CDA66841/2	Handel: Deborah	1993
United	88002	Music from the Courts of Europe: London	1993
Hyperion	CDA66751/3	Handel: Ottone	1993
Hyperion	CDA66677	Purcell: Complete Anthems & Services, Vol. 7	1994
Hyperion	CDA66686	Purcell: Complete Anthems & Services, Vol. 8	1994
Hyperion	CDA66693	Purcell: Complete Anthems & Services, Vol. 9	1994
Hyperion	CDA66707	Purcell: Complete Anthems & Services, Vol. 10	1994
Hyperion	CDA66710	Purcell: Complete Secular solo songs, Vol. 1	1994
Hyperion	CDA66716	Purcell: Complete Anthems & Services, Vol. 11	1994
Hyperion	CDA66720	Purcell: Complete Secular solo songs, Vol. 2	1994
Hyperion	CDA66730	Purcell: Complete Secular solo songs, Vol. 3	1994
Hyperion	CDA66769	Vivaldi: Sacred Music Vol. 1	1995
Hyperion	CDA66797	Handel: James Bowman sings English Arias	1995
Hyperion	CDA66881/2	Vivaldi: Complete Cello Sonatas	1995
Hyperion	CDA66961/2	Handel: The Occasional Oratorio	1995
Hyperion	CDA66779	Vivaldi: Sacred Music Vol. 2	1996
Hyperion	CDA66843	Bach: Six Trio Sonatas	1996
Hyperion	CDA66875	Scarlatti/Hasse: Salve Regina	1996
Hyperion	CDA67171/3	Handel: Joseph & his Brethren	1996
Hyperion	CDA66789	Vivaldi: Sacred Music Vol. 3	1997
Hyperion	CDA66967	Handel/Telemann: Water Music	1997
Hyperion	CDA67201/2	Bach: Mass in B minor	1997
Hyperion	CDA67241/2	Handel: Alexander Balus	1997
Hyperion	CDA67281/2	Vivaldi: Sacred Music, Vol. 4 - Juditha Triumphans	1998
Hyperion	CDA67048	Lo Sposalizio	1998
Hyperion	CDA67059	Kuhnau: Sacred Music	1998
Hyperion	CDA67073	Vivaldi: Concerti con molti istromenti	1998
Accenture	CONS1001	The Bright Seraphim	1998
Hyperion	CDA66799	Vivaldi: Sacred Music Vol. 5	1999
Hyperion	CDA67108	Boccherini, Astorga: Stabat Mater	1999
Hyperion	CDA67283/4	Handel: L'Allegro, il Penseroso ed il Moderato	1999
Accenture	CONS1002	The Grand Tour	1999
Hyperion	CDA67160	Knüpfer: Sacred Music	2000
Hyperion	CDA66809	Vivaldi: Sacred Music, Vol. 6	2000
Hyperion	CDA66819	Vivaldi: Sacred Music, Vol. 7	2001
Hyperion	CDA67260	Schelle: Sacred Music	2001
Hyperion	CDA67266	Haydn, Hummel, Hertel Trumpet Concertos	2001
Hyperion	CDA67286	The Coronation of King George, 1727	2001
Hyperion	CDA67298	Handel: The Choice of Hercules	2002
Hyperion	CDA67361/2	Vivaldi: La Senna Festeggiante	2002
Hyperion	CDA66829	Vivaldi: Sacred Music, Vol. 8	2002
Hyperion	CDA66839	Vivaldi: Sacred Music, Vol. 9	2003
Hyperion	CDA67350	Zelenka: Sacred Music	2003
Hyperion	CDA67428	Monteverdi: Sacred Music, Vol. 1	2003
Hyperion	CDA67438	Monteverdi: Sacred Music, Vol. 2	2004
Hyperion	CDA67463	Handel: Ode for St Cecilia's Day	2004
Hyperion	CDA67487	Monteverdi: Sacred Music, Vol. 3	2004
Hyperion	CDA66849	Vivaldi: Sacred Music, Vol. 10	2004
Hyperion	CDA67510	Haydn, Michael: Requiem	2005
Hyperion	CDA 67519	Monteverdi: Sacred Music, Vol. 4	2005
Hyperion	CDA67553	Vivaldi: Cello Concertos	2006
Hyperion	CDA67560	Mozart: Exsultate jubilate	2006
Hyperion	CDA67531/2	Monteverdi: Vespers, 1610	2006
Hyperion	CDA67570	Rossini: Petite Messe solennelle	2006
Hyperion	CDA67627	Handel: German Arias	2007
Vivat	VIVAT 101	I was glad: Sacred Music of Stanford & Parry	2013
Vivat	VIVAT 102	Couperin: Trois Leçons de Ténèbres	2013
Vivat	VIVAT 104	Monteverdi: Heaven and Earth	2013
Vivat	VIVAT 105	Handel: Your tuneful voice	2014
Vivat	VIVAT 106	Purcell: Ten Sonatas in Four Parts	2014
Vivat	VIVAT 110	Purcell: Twelve Sonatas of Three Parts	2015
Vivat	VIVAT 111	Handel-Mendelssohn: Israel in Ägypten	2016
Vivat	VIVAT 113	A Voice from Heaven	2017
Vivat	VIVAT 117	Abbandonata: Handel Italian cantatas	2018
Vivat	VIVAT 118	Elegy: Purcell & Blow duets for countertenors	2019
Vivat	VIVAT 121	Purcell: Royal Odes	2020
Vivat	VIVAT 122	Purcell: Birthday Odes for Queen Mary	2021
Vivat	VIVAT 123	Bach: Six Trio Sonatas	2023

== Collections ==
Label	Catalogue No	Title	Year
Hyperion	KING1	The Music of The King's Consort	1991
Hyperion	KING2	Essential Purcell	1994
Hyperion	KING3	The James Bowman Collection	1996
Hyperion	KING4	The King's Consort Baroque Collection	1997
Hyperion	KING5	Essential Bach	1999
Hyperion	KING6	Essential Handel	2005
Hyperion	KING7	The King's Consort Collection	2005
