= Arcangeli =

Arcangeli is an Italian surname. Notable people with the surname include:

- Angela Arcangeli (born 1991), Italian basketball player
- Chiara Arcangeli (born 1983), Italian female volleyball player
- Giovanni Arcangeli (1840–1921), Italian botanist
- Domiziano Arcangeli (born 1968), Italian-American actor, producer and writer
- Francesco Arcangeli (1737–1768), Italian cook and criminal
- Luigi Arcangeli (1902–1931), Italian motorcycle racer
- Telemaco Arcangeli (1923–1998), Italian racewalker
