= Toronto Summer Music Festival =

Annual classical music festival and academy

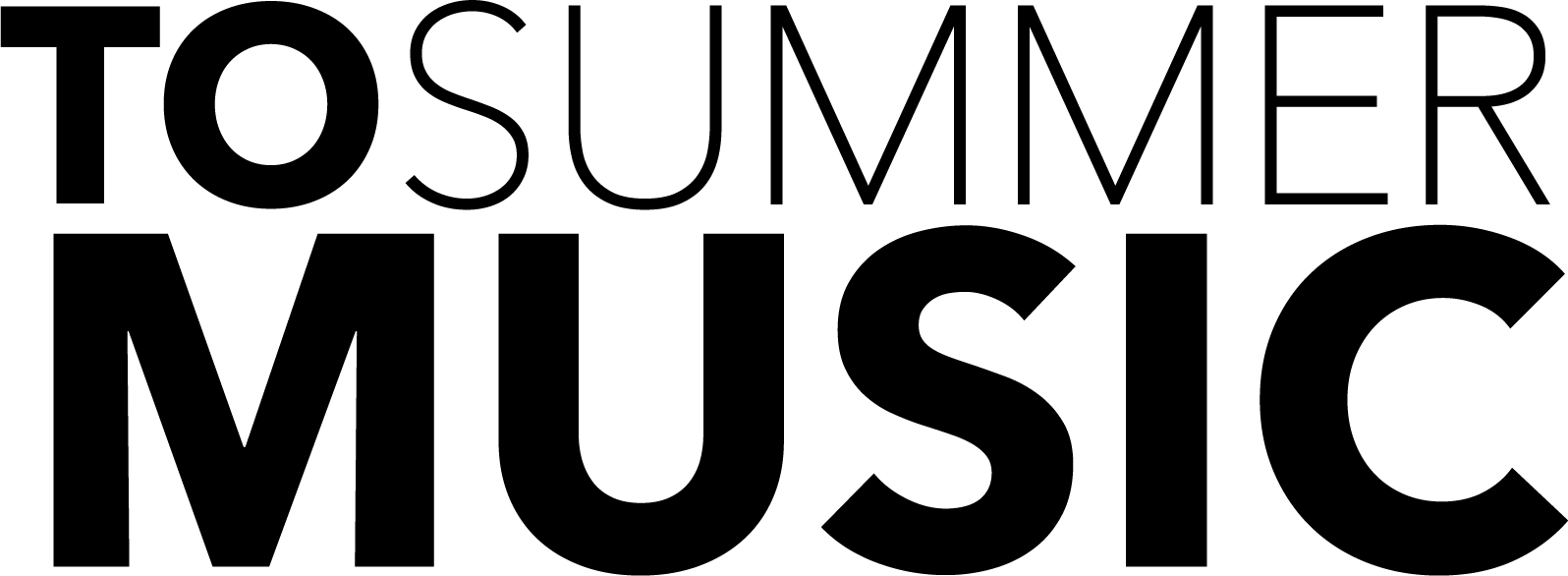
TSM Logo

Toronto Summer Music (TSM) is a flagship classical music Festival and Academy held annually in Toronto, Ontario, Canada.

Musicians perform at concerts held at The Royal Conservatory of Music at Koerner Hall, at the University of Toronto, Faculty of Music, and at Heliconian Hall.

The Toronto Summer Music Festival runs concurrently with the academy program and features renowned Canadian and international artists in a series of chamber music and art song concerts, ReGeneration concerts spotlighting TSM Academy Fellows, and various masterclasses and lectures. In selecting the artists for the Festival, director William Fedkenheuer seeks internationally recognized pedagogues.

The TSM Academy's Emerging Artist Program gives 18- to 35-year-old musicians an opportunity to study and learn from international faculty members from across Canada, the United States, and Europe. The Emerging Artist Program emphasizes performance and offers two programs: the Chamber Music Institute (for string players and pianists) and the Art of Song (for singers and pianists). TSM's Fellowship Donors fully fund the tuition, accommodation, and per diem expenses for all accepted applicants.

The Community Program is focused on providing learning and performance opportunities for advanced adult amateur musicians. TSM aims to provide an experience that deepens the participants' relationship with music in their daily lives. Community Program participants can choose from three streams: Chamber Music, Chamber Choir, and the Piano Masterclass. For one week each summer, they rehearse and perform with professional musicians, and attend workshops, masterclasses, and Festival concerts.

== History ==
Toronto Summer Music (“TSM”) began as the Silver Creek Music Foundation, the vision of David Beach, former Dean of the Faculty of Music at the University of Toronto. The festival's inaugural years included two pilot programs in the summers of 2004 and 2005: two-week chamber music workshops in piano, strings, and percussion, alongside public concerts featuring renowned artists such as the Gryphon Trio, Scott St. John, Shauna Rolston, Lydia Wong, and NEXUS.

In the summer of 2006, under the direction of founding Artistic Director Agnes Grossmann, TSM launched its first full four-week Festival, welcoming celebrated international artists including Menahem Pressler, János Starker, the Leipzig String Quartet, and the Berlin Philharmonic Wind Ensemble. In addition to performing, these artists offered masterclasses for aspiring young musicians. Grossmann's programming was ambitious and eclectic—highlights included a screening of the original silent film version of the 1975 Pina Bausch ballet Le Sacre du Printemps, accompanied live by the piano duo Anagnoson & Kinton. The Festival's final week also featured fully staged operas with orchestra, conducted by Grossmann herself: Don Giovanni (2006), The Barber of Seville (2007), Ariadne auf Naxos (2008), and an Opera Extravaganza in 2009.

In September 2010, Douglas McNabney, one of Canada's most active chamber musicians and former artistic director at Domaine Forget, succeeded Ms. Grossman as artistic director. During his tenure at TSM (2010–2016), McNabney reorganized the academy as a full-fellowship program for a select group of some of the best emerging chamber musicians, singers, and collaborative pianists. The academy differentiates itself because of its concentration on performance with international musicians of the highest calibre. Past Academy Mentors include Martin Beaver, Johannes Moser, Gerald Finley, Soile Isokoski, Angela Cheng, Martin Katz, Julius Drake, and more.

The last several Festivals have been programmed thematically, focusing on a different place or period in music history and has featured top-level international guest artists at Koerner Hall, Walter Hall, and other venues around Toronto with over 50 public events over the course of 4 weeks.

TSM has collaborated with some of the most celebrated classical music institutions in Canada including the Toronto Symphony Orchestra, Canadian Opera Company, and the Banff Centre. In 2015, TSM presented several concerts in collaboration with PANAMANIA, the cultural component of the 2015 PanAm Games.

Festival attendance has increased rapidly, over 68% in the past five years. In 2015, TSM launched a new audience engagement program, a Community Academy for adult amateur musicians funded through the Metcalf Foundation's competitive Creative Strategies Incubator. As a relatively youthful arts organization, TSM subsists on only 10% government grant funding and has been acclaimed for successful fundraising initiatives and ticket sales. Toronto Summer Music has been honoured with awards including the Mo Davies Award for Excellence in Fundraising from the Association of Fundraising Professionals in 2014.

In 2016, TSM was pleased to announce that acclaimed Canadian violinist Jonathan Crow would become its next artistic director. Crow is the concertmaster of the Toronto Symphony Orchestra and a founding member of the New Orford String Quartet. He is also associate professor of Violin at the University of Toronto Faculty of Music, as well as the incoming Director of the Temerty Orchestral Program and a member of the violin faculty at the Royal Conservatory of Music's Glenn Gould School.

In September 2025, Canadian violinist William Fedkenheuer succeeded Crow as artistic director of Toronto Summer Music.

TSM, by means of its Festival and Academy programs, provides music lovers with an opportunity to enjoy and deepen their knowledge of classical music by bringing audiences together with international artists and emerging professional musicians and singers for a successful round of concerts, lectures, and masterclasses. No other musical programming of its kind is available in Toronto in the summer months, when artists of international stature come together to mentor young musicians and to give outstanding concerts in a series of public performances.

== Artistic Director: William Fedkenheuer ==
Canadian violinist William Fedkenheuer is a two-time Grammy-nominee and artistic director of Toronto Summer Music. Originally from Calgary, Will is celebrated internationally as a performer, educator, and arts consultant, bringing more than 25 years of experience at the highest levels of chamber music, including his work with the Miró, Fry Street, and Borromeo String Quartets.

He has performed on many of the world's most prestigious stages—from Carnegie Hall and Esterházy Castle to Suntory Hall and the Library of Congress—and collaborated with renowned artists such as Leon Fleisher, Audra McDonald, Yo-Yo Ma, Dawn Upshaw, Wu Man, Sasha Cooke, Midori, Caroline Shaw, and Kevin Puts. His discography includes the Grammy-nominated albums Home and House of Belonging, as well as a benchmark Beethoven cycle with the Miró Quartet on Pentatone.

Will's early career was shaped by his roots in Canadian fiddle traditions—he was named a Canadian National Fiddle Champion in 1989 and he made his solo debut with the Calgary Philharmonic at age 17. He studied at Rice and Indiana University and spent formative summers at Tanglewood, the Ravinia Festival's Steans Music Institute, and the Music Academy of the West.

Currently a member of the Miró Quartet, Will serves as Professor of Practice in Violin and Chamber Music at The University of Texas's Butler School of Music, where he co-directs the Young Professional String Quartet Program and mentors emerging artists. In his capacity as a public speaker and professional development coach, he works with individuals and institutions across the arts sector to develop vision, strategy, and impact.

As artistic director of Toronto Summer Music, Will is honoured to return to his Canadian roots and lead a new era of growth, mentorship, and community engagement for TSM. Will is a citizen of Canada and the United States. When not travelling, he lives with his wife Leah, their two sons Max and Olli, and their dogs, Frizzy and Lola.
