= Arcangelo Califano =

Italian composer

Arcangelo Califano (fl. 1730s–1756) was a baroque composer and cellist. He played in the orchestra of the Dresden Hofkapelle. His surviving compositions include sonatas for double reeds and basso continuo.
