= Alina Ibragimova =

Russian-British violinist (born 1985)

Alina Ibragimova MBE
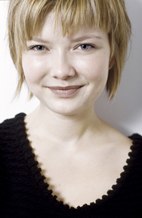

Background information
- Born: 28 September 1985 (age 40); Polevskoy, Russian SSR, USSR
- Genres: Baroque, classical
- Occupation: Violinist
- Instrument: Violin
- Years active: 1998–
- Labels: Hyperion & BIS Records

Alina Rinatovna Ibragimova MBE (Russian: Али́на Рина́товна Ибраги́мова; born 28 September 1985) is a Russian-British violinist.

== Early life and education ==
Ibragimova was born in Polevskoy, Russian SSR. Her family was musical, and she began playing the violin at age four. At 5, she started at the Gnessin School of Music in Moscow, studying under Valentina Korolkova, and by the age of 6 had started her career by playing with various orchestras, including the Bolshoi Theatre Orchestra. She was aged 10 in 1996 when her father, Rinat Ibragimov, took up the post of principal double bass with the London Symphony Orchestra, and the family moved to England. In the following year, Ibragimova began her studies at the Yehudi Menuhin School (where her mother was professor of violin) under Natasha Boyarskaya.

In December 1998, Ibragimova performed with Nicola Benedetti at the opening ceremony of the 50th Anniversary of the Universal Declaration of Human Rights at UNESCO in Paris; they played Bach's double violin concerto under the baton of Yehudi Menuhin. Menuhin died three months later, and Ibragimova performed the slow movement of the same concerto at his funeral in Westminster Abbey.

After finishing her studies at the Yehudi Menuhin School, Ibragimova went on to the Guildhall School of Music and Drama for a year, and then to the Royal College of Music, studying under Gordan Nikolitch and baroque violin with Adrian Butterfield. She has also studied with Christian Tetzlaff under the auspices of the Kronberg Academy Masters programme.

== Career ==
After winning several international competitions, in 2002 Ibragimova won the London Symphony Orchestra Music Scholarship (formerly the Shell Prize), an important early boost to her career. The next breakthrough came in 2005 when Ibragimova played and directed Mozart's second violin concerto with the Kremerata Baltica in Mozartwoche at the Salzburg Mozarteum.

Ibragimova was a member of the BBC Radio 3 New Generation Artists scheme 2005–7. She has performed concertos with the London Symphony Orchestra, Deutsche Kammerphilharmonie Bremen, the Philharmonia Orchestra, City of Birmingham Symphony Orchestra, BBC Symphony Orchestra, Radio-Sinfonie-Orchester Frankfurt, and the Seattle Symphony, working with conductors including Sir Charles Mackerras, Valery Gergiev, Sir John Eliot Gardiner, Paavo Järvi, Richard Hickox and Osmo Vänskä.

In 2005, Ibragimova formed the period-instrument Chiaroscuro Quartet with fellow students at the Royal College, a string quartet specialising in music from the classical and early romantic periods played on gut strings with historical bows.

Over the last seasons Ibragimova has performed concertos with Budapest Festival Orchestra, Pittsburgh Symphony, San Francisco Symphony, Royal Concertgebouw Orchestra, London Symphony, Philharmonia Orchestra, Gürzenich-Orchester and Dresden Philharmonic, working with Robin Ticciati, Edward Gardner, Daniel Harding, Nathalie Stutzmann, Vladimir Jurowski and Maxim Emelyanychev among others.

In recital, Ibragimova performs regularly at London's Wigmore Hall, Berlin's Pierre Boulez Saal, Hamburg's Elbphilharmonie, Tokyo's Metropolitan Theatre and the BBC Proms where she performed Bach's Sonatas and Partitas for solo violin in the Royal Albert Hall. She frequently collaborates with pianist Cédric Tiberghien.

== Honours ==
Ibragimova has received a number of awards, including the Royal Philharmonic Society Young Artist Award 2010, and Emily Anderson Prize (the youngest-ever winner), Borletti-Buitoni Trust, and a Classical BRIT. She performs on a c.1775 Anselmo Bellosio provided by Georg von Opel. Ibragimova was awarded the 2019 RPS Instrumentalist Award.

She was appointed a Member of the Order of the British Empire (MBE) in the 2016 New Year Honours for services to music.

== Personal life ==
In 2015 Ibragimova married Tom Service, a writer and classical music critic, whom she met when he interviewed her for The Guardian. They lived in Greenwich, London, and later divorced.

== Selected discography ==
- https://alinaibragimova.com/recordings/
- Georg Philipp Telemann: Fantasias for Solo Violin (Hyperion Records. CDA68384, 2022)
- Niccolo Paganini: 24 Caprices (Hyperion Records, CDA68366, 2021)
- Johannes Brahms: Violin Sonatas with Cédric Tiberghien, piano (Hyperion Records, CDA68200, 2018)
- Louis Vierne & César Franck: Violin Sonatas with Cédric Tiberghien, piano (Hyperion Records, CDA68204, 2018)
- Wolfgang Amadeus Mozart: Violin Sonatas K302, 380 & 526 with Cédric Tiberghien, piano (Hyperion Records, CDA68175, 2016)
- Wolfgang Amadeus Mozart: Violin Sonatas K305, 376 & 402 with Cédric Tiberghien, piano (Hyperion Records, CDA68092, 2016)
- Wolfgang Amadeus Mozart: Violin Sonatas K301, 304, 379 & 481 with Cédric Tiberghien, piano (Hyperion Records, CDA68091, 2016)
- Johann Sebastian Bach: Violin Concertos with Arcangelo & Jonathan Cohen (conductor) (Hyperion Records, CDA68068, 2015)
- Johann Sebastian Bach: Sonatas and Partitas for Solo Violin (Hyperion Records, CDA 67691/2, 2009)
- Eugène Ysaÿe: Sonatas for solo violin (Hyperion Records, CDA67993, 2015)
- Felix Mendelssohn: Violin Concerto (Mendelssohn) in E minor, Op 64, Violin Concerto in D minor with Orchestra of the Age of Enlightenment, Vladimir Jurowski (Hyperion Records, CDA67795, 2012)
