= Wigmore Hall =

Recital venue in London, England

Coordinates: 51.5166°N 0.1482°W

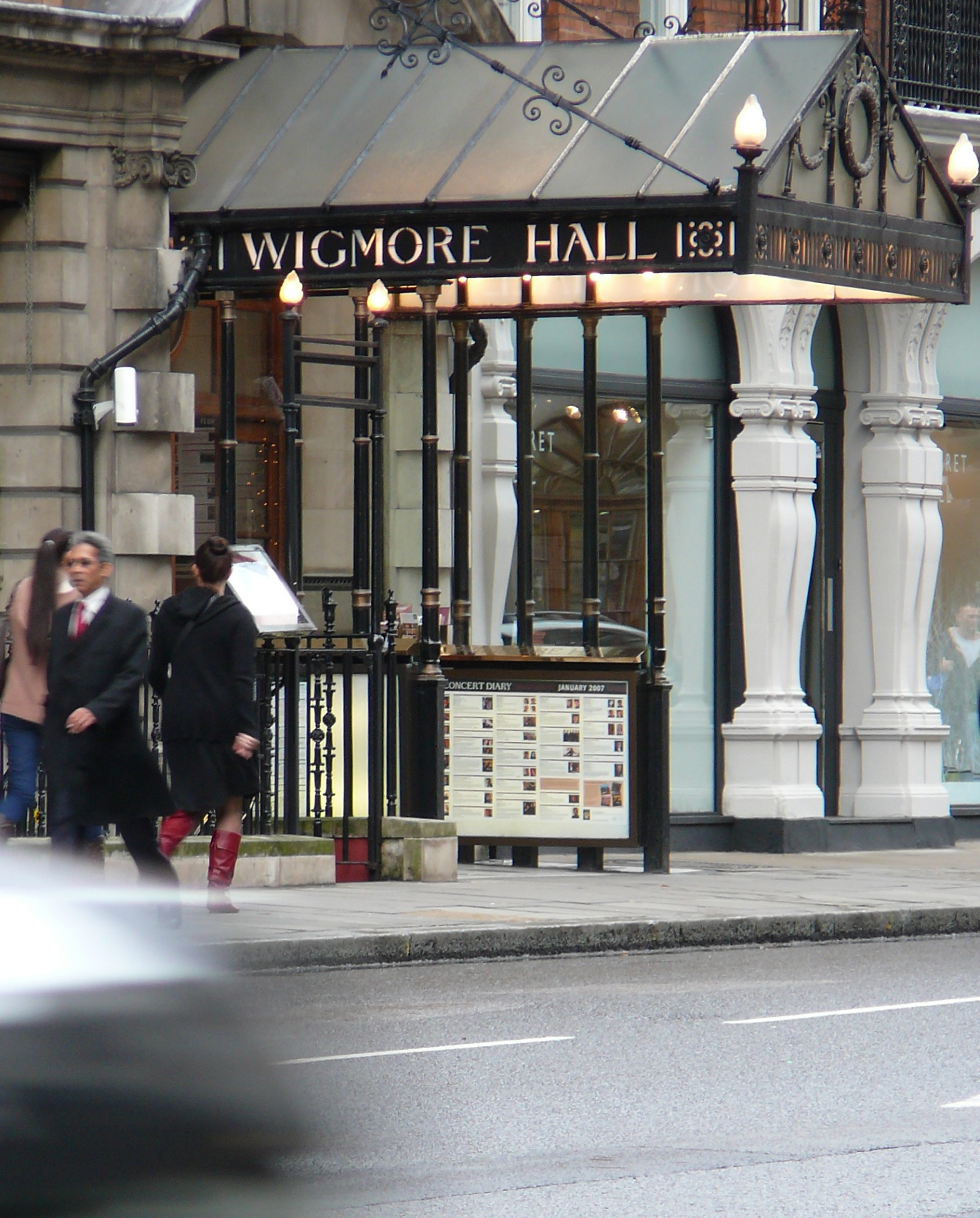
Wigmore Hall's entrance is framed by an iron-and-glass canopy.

Wigmore Hall is a concert hall at 36 Wigmore Street in west London, England. It was designed by T. E. Collcutt and opened in 1901 as the Bechstein Hall; it is considered to have particularly good acoustics. It specialises in performances of chamber music, early music, vocal music and song recitals, and hosts over five hundred concerts each year, as well as a weekly concert broadcast on BBC Radio 3. It has been a Grade II listed building since 1966.

== Bechstein Hall ==
The Bechstein Hall was built between 1899 and 1901 by C. Bechstein Pianofortefabrik, the German piano manufacturer, whose showroom was next door. The British architect T. E. Collcutt was commissioned to design the space. Collcutt was also responsible for the Savoy Hotel on the Strand (since modified) and the Palace Theatre on Cambridge Circus (originally the Royal English Opera House), with which the Hall shares pale terracotta ornamentation.

Bechstein Hall opened on 31 May 1901 with a concert featuring the pianist and composer Ferruccio Busoni and the violinist Eugène Ysaÿe. During its early period the Hall attracted great musicians like Artur Schnabel, Peter Arnold, Pablo de Sarasate, Percy Grainger, Myra Hess, Arthur Rubinstein, Vladimir Rosing, Alexander Siloti, Camille Saint-Saëns, Jascha Spivakovsky, Max Reger and Marian Anderson (who performed there in 1933).

The Bechstein Company built similar concert halls in Saint Petersburg and Paris, though like its London offices and performing space, these and the business as a whole suffered during the First World War. Bechstein was forced to cease trading in Britain on 5 June 1916 after the passing of the Trading with the Enemy Amendment Act 1916 and all property, including the concert hall and the showrooms, was seized and summarily closed. In 1916 the Hall was sold as enemy property at auction to Debenhams for £56,500 – a figure considerably short of the £100,000 cost of the building alone. It was then rechristened Wigmore Hall and opened under the new name in 1917.

== Design ==
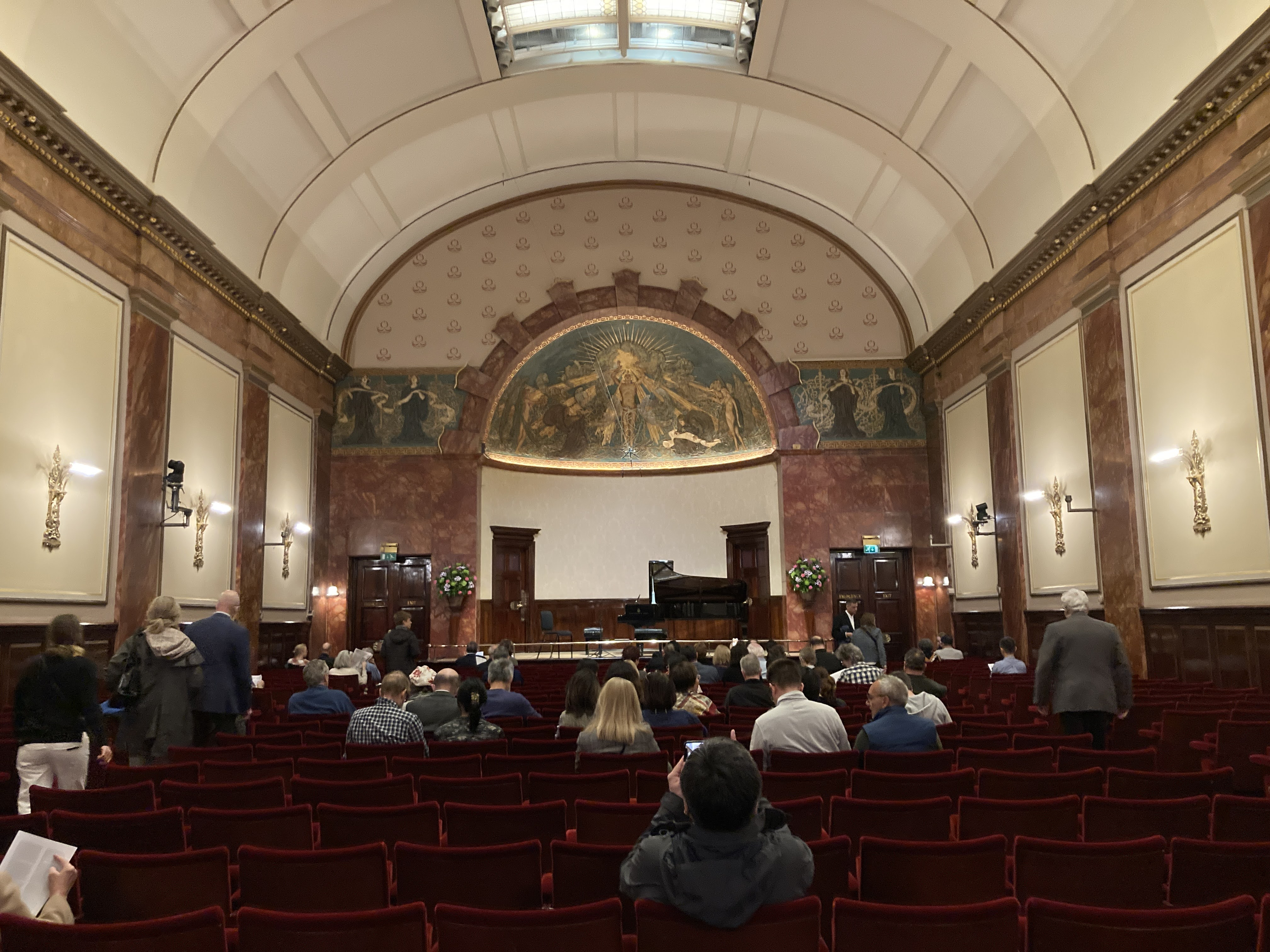
The interior of Wigmore Hall prior to a concert

The Wigmore Hall follows the Renaissance style, using alabaster and marble walls, which furnish a flat, rectangular hall with a small raised stage area complete with a cupola above depicting the Soul of Music. The distinctive mural was designed by Gerald Moira, who was responsible for a number of contemporary public art works; he later became principal of the Edinburgh College of Art. After the completion of the design, the cupola was executed by the sculptor Frank Lynn Jenkins. It was restored in 1991 and 1992 and has often been featured in the Hall's marketing and print material.

The Hall is considered to have one of the best acoustics for classical music in Europe. It was refurbished in 2004 and was widely praised for being completed on time and on budget. The Hall's current capacity, spread across the stalls and a smaller balcony, is 545 seats. In 2005, the Wigmore Hall Trust purchased a long lease of 300 years for £3.1m. This both secured the future of the Hall and allowed money previously required for rent to be used for further development of its artistic programme. There are two bars and a restaurant on the lower ground floor, below the main auditorium.

== Artists and associations ==
Audio description of Wigmore Hall by Colin Low

Wigmore Hall enjoyed a number of long associations with many great artists of the 20th century including Elisabeth Schwarzkopf, Victoria de los Ángeles, Sergei Prokofiev, Ferruccio Bonavia, Shura Cherkassky, Paul Hindemith, Andrés Segovia, Peter Pears, Benjamin Britten and Francis Poulenc.

=== Benjamin Britten ===
The Hall maintained a particularly fruitful relationship with Britten, both as composer and performer. His Serenade for Tenor, Horn and Strings, the Second String Quartet, The Holy Sonnets of John Donne and Seven Sonnets of Michelangelo were premièred at the Hall, as were extracts from the opera Peter Grimes (ahead of its world première at the Sadler's Wells Theatre in June 1945).

Wigmore Hall commemorated its association with Britten with a series of performances and events entitled 'Before Life and After' in November and December 2012. Those concerts featured artists such as Alice Coote, Ann Murray, Mark Padmore, Gerald Finley, Julius Drake, Malcolm Martineau, Martyn Brabbins, Nash Ensemble and the Takács Quartet, given to mark the beginning of a year-long international celebration of the 100th anniversary of Britten's birth.

Wigmore Hall's 2019–20 season featured a series focusing on Britten and his connections with the venue. Allan Clayton and James Baillieu commemorated the first performance of Seven Sonnets of Michelangelo, given by Britten and his partner, the tenor Peter Pears, on 23 September 1942, alongside a lineup of additional singers in further Britten works. Later in the season, Wigmore Hall commemorated both Britten's birthday and the anniversary of his death.

== Lieder and song ==
Since its inception, the Hall has been a major hub for Lieder and art song performance. The British première of Schubert's Die schöne Müllerin took place at Wigmore Hall in 1903 as well as the first UK performance of Leoš Janáček's song cycle The Diary of One Who Disappeared in 1922.

Peter Schreier, Janet Baker and Margaret Price performed regularly at the Hall, and in recent years Wigmore has produced recitals featuring Thomas Quasthoff, Ian Bostridge, Susan Graham, Mark Padmore, Sir Thomas Allen, Matthias Goerne, Dame Felicity Lott, Angelika Kirchschlager, Simon Keenlyside, Anne Sofie von Otter, Wolfgang Holzmair, Christopher Maltman, Andreas Scholl, and Soile Isokoski. More recent performers include Christian Gerhaher, Florian Boesch, Roderick Williams, Iestyn Davies, Sandrine Piau, Lucy Crowe and Henk Neven.

== Piano and chamber music ==
Instrumentalists and chamber groups performing at the hall include Leslie Howard, Vladimir Ashkenazy, Charlie Siem, Stephen Kovacevich, András Schiff, Joshua Bell, Maxim Vengerov, Angela Hewitt, Steven Isserlis, Pierre-Laurent Aimard, Steven Osborne, Stephen Hough, Bruce Brubaker, the Nash Ensemble, the Beaux Arts and Florestan Trios and the Artemis, Aviv, Belcea, Emerson, Endellion, Hagen, Jerusalem, Takács and Zehetmair Quartets. In recent years, artists and ensembles including Igor Levit, Iestyn Davies, the Doric String Quartet, The Elias String Quartet, Ning Feng, Francesco Piemontesi, Alina Ibragimova, Mahan Esfahani, Arcangelo, Hilary Hahn, Thomas Ades, Sir George Benjamin, Julia Fisher, Nicola Benedetti, Isabelle Faust, Bretton Brown, and Christian Gerhaher have become associated with and connected to Wigmore Hall through concert series and artistic residencies. The Hall is noted for helping young artists launch and develop their international careers.

The following chamber works had their UK premières at the Hall: Janáček's Sonata for violin and piano; Béla Bartók's six string quartets; Arnold Schoenberg's String Quartet No. 2; Claude Debussy's Violin Sonata; Aaron Copland's Contrasts; and Richard Strauss's Sextet from Capriccio.

== Director ==
Wigmore Hall's director is Limerick-born John Gilhooly, OBE, a classical singer. He joined as CEO in 2000 and became artistic director in addition in 2005 at the age of 32. Gilhooly has maintained and expanded the Hall's core repertoire of classical song, chamber and early music, as well as introducing new initiatives to attract a more diverse audience. Gilhooly introduced jazz evenings, curated by the American jazz pianist Brad Mehldau. World music is also a regular feature and there is a series of late night concerts, which have attracted new younger listeners.

The previous artistic director was Paul Kildea. Before him, William Lyne served as director for 37 years from 1966 to 2003, during which time he introduced themed seasons, the first of which was the Gabriel Fauré Series in 1979–80, with subsequent programmes dedicated to Robert Schumann, Henry Purcell, Johann Sebastian Bach, György Ligeti, Joseph Haydn, Dmitri Shostakovich and Ralph Vaughan Williams.

== New music ==
Building on its heritage, Wigmore Hall has become a major commissioner of new music. On 31 August 2007, John Gilhooly announced a scheme for modern composers.

=== Composer-in-Residence ===
Wigmore fosters further links with the contemporary music scene through the introduction of its Composer-in-Residence scheme. Luke Bedford became the first Composer-in-Residence in 2009 and was succeeded by Julian Anderson in 2013. Alongside performances of their work, Wigmore has featured series of concerts dedicated to the music of Sir George Benjamin, Huw Watkins, Thomas Larcher, Elliott Carter, Brett Dean, Kevin Volans, James MacMillan and Jörg Widmann. The 2019–20 season Composer-in-Residence was Vijay Iyer.

=== Recent commissions ===
In 2012, John Gilhooly publicised a renewed commissioning scheme, supported by a major gift from the Fondation Hoffmann and its president, the Swiss businessman, conservationist and philanthropist, André Hoffmann. The Fondation's donation has ensured the commission of new works by Julian Anderson, Péter Eötvös, Anna Meredith, Nico Muhly, Wolfgang Rihm, Judith Weir and Jörg Widmann and from 2013 the Hall has committed to premièring 13 new works per season.

== Competitions ==
The biennial Wigmore Hall/Independent Opera International Song Competition (formerly the Wigmore Hall/Kohn Foundation International Song Competition) was founded in 1997 and has run at the venue since then. After 20 years of support from The Kohn Foundation, the 2019 Competition was sponsored by Independent Opera at Sadler's Wells. Independent Opera's relationship with Wigmore Hall dates back 10 years to its first Wigmore Hall/Independent Opera Voice Fellowship awarded to bass Matthew Rose. The Preliminary Round, the Semi-Finals and Final are held at Wigmore Hall.

Sinc July 2020 the Hall has also hosted the triennial Wigmore Hall International String Quartet Competition (formerly The London International String Quartet Competition and initially the Portsmouth International String Quartet Competition). Singers and pianists aged 33 or under from around the world are eligible.

== Broadcasts and recordings ==
The hall is a venue for broadcasting and recording. BBC Radio 3 transmits its lunchtime concert from Wigmore Hall every Monday during the season, which runs from September to July. Recent BBC Lunchtime Concerts have featured Benjamin Grosvenor, the Škampa Quartet, Christoph Denoth, Noriko Ogawa, Gautier Capuçon, Gabriela Montero, the ATOS Trio, Clara Mouriz, Mark Padmore and Yevgeny Sudbin. A number of evening concerts are also broadcast live or recorded for later transmission on Sky Arts TV as well as being released by recording companies.

== Wigmore Hall Live ==
Wigmore Hall also publishes recordings of concerts by prominent artists on its own record label Wigmore Hall Live, receiving the special award Label of the Year in the 2011 Gramophone Awards. The label entered the classical charts with a recital by the late Lorraine Hunt Lieberson, which has also been nominated for a Gramophone Award. Recent additions to the catalogue include recitals by the violinist Maxim Vengerov of works by Bach and Beethoven and baritone Roderick Williams's concert of works by Mahler, Korngold and Schumann, accompanied by the Austrian pianist Helmut Deutsch.

== Wigmore Hall Learning ==
Since 1994, Wigmore Hall's Learning programme has been giving people of all ages, backgrounds and abilities opportunities to take part in creative music making, engaging a broad and diverse audience through creative projects, concerts, workshops and online resources. Every year there are around 600 Learning events, with nearly 30,000 visits to the programme.

Wigmore Hall Learning collaborates with community, education, arts, health and social care organisations, working in partnership to engage people who might not otherwise have the opportunity to take part. The programme includes work with schools, including concerts, teacher training, projects with hospital schools and the innovative Partner Schools Programme, in which Wigmore Hall Learning works in partnership with schools and Music Education Hubs to co-produce activity over three years, creating a creative whole school plan for music.

Families are invited to the hall to take part in interactive workshops and concerts for families with babies, children in their early years and children aged 5+. Community partnerships include Music for Life (for people living with dementia and their families, friends and carers), projects with the Cardinal Hume Centre, which enable people to gain the skills they need to overcome poverty and homelessness, and activity with Solace Women's Aid, which supports women and children who have experienced domestic violence.

Pathways is a range of schemes and events which provides a platform for emerging artists, supporting the next generation of musicians and music leaders. This includes annual Trainee Music Leaders, Royal Academy of Music / Wigmore Hall Fellowship Ensemble and RPS / Wigmore Hall Apprentice Composer schemes, as well as Bechstein Sessions, a new series of informal performances which showcase emerging talent.

Behind the Music is a programme of study events including talks, lecture-recitals, masterclasses, study groups and Come and Sing days.

== Collaborations ==
In March 2026 Wigmore Hall announced a partnership with the planned Dunard Centre in Edinburgh, which was then under construction. The two venues will collaborate on programming, artistic exchanges and special commissions. Gilhooly will chair an "artistic advisory committee" at the Dunard Centre.

== See also ==
- List of concert halls
