= Matthew Rose (bass) =

British opera singer

Matthew Rose (born 4 May 1978 in Seaford, UK) is an English operatic bass.

== Biography ==
Matthew Rose studied at Seaford College and the Curtis Institute of Music, Philadelphia. In 2003, Rose joined the Young Artists Programme at the Royal Opera House, Covent Garden.

Rose was awarded the John Christie Prize at Glyndebourne in 2006. Rose received the Independent Opera/Wigmore Hall Fellowship in 2007. In June 2012 Rose was awarded the Critics Circle Award for Exceptional Young Talent.

== Operatic repertoire ==
- Doctor in Vanessa by Barber
- Don Fernando in Fidelio by Beethoven
- Zuniga in Carmen by Bizet
- Claggart, Lieutenant Ratcliffe & Mr Flint
  in Billy Budd by Britten
- Abbott in Curlew River by Britten
- Bottom in A Midsummer Night's Dream by Britten
- Noye in Noye's Fludde by Britten
- Swallow in Peter Grimes by Britten
- Collatinus in The Rape of Lucretia by Britten
- Raimondo in Lucia di Lammermoor by Donizetti
- Talbot in Maria Stuarda by Donizetti
- Albert in La Juive by Halévy
- Haraschta in The Cunning Little Vixen by Janáček
- Seneca in L'incoronazione di Poppea by Monteverdi
- Speaker & Sarastro in The Magic Flute by Mozart
- Leporello in Don Giovanni by Mozart
- Publio in La clemenza di Tito by Mozart
- Title role in The Marriage of Figaro by Mozart
- Crespel in The Tales of Hoffmann by Offenbach
- Colline in La bohème by Puccini
- Don Basilio in The Barber of Seville by Rossini
- Truffaldino in Ariadne auf Naxos by Strauss
- Tutor in Elektra by Strauss
- Tiresias in Oedipus Rex by Stravinsky
- Nick Shadow in The Rake's Progress by Stravinsky
- Gremin in Yevgeny Onegin by Tchaikovsky
- Il re in Aida by Verdi
- Monk in Don Carlos by Verdi
- Pistola in Falstaff by Verdi
- Lodovico in Otello by Verdi
- Tom in Un ballo in maschera by Verdi
- Pogner in Die Meistersinger von Nürnberg by Wagner
- Fasolt in Das Rheingold by Wagner
- Claudio in Agrippina by Handel

== Recordings ==
He has recorded with Sir Colin Davis (Berlioz L'enfance du Christ, Otello and a Child of our Time for LSO Live), Sir Charles Mackerras (Mozart Vespers and Schubert Mass in E flat with Dresden Staatskappelle) and Richard Hickox (Schubert Mass in E flat); Ariadne auf Naxos with Sir Richard Armstrong, Rossini's Stabat Mater with LPO and Yannick Nézet-Séguin, Tristan and Isolde and William Tell with Antonio Pappano, A Midsummer Night's Dream by Britten with Ilan Volkov from Glyndebourne, Billy Budd with Daniel Harding (winner Grammy award), Messiah with King's College, Cambridge (also on DVD) and a CD of Liszt songs with Iain Burnside. On DVD he can be seen in Carmen, Faust and Acis and Galatea from the Royal Opera House, Billy Budd and The Rake's Progress from Glyndebourne and Haydn's Creation with John Nelson and the Netherlands Radio Chamber Orchestra. In 2013 he released his début solo recital disc, Schubert's Winterreise, with pianist Gary Matthewman, for Stone Records.
