= Christiane Karg =

German operatic soprano (born 1980)

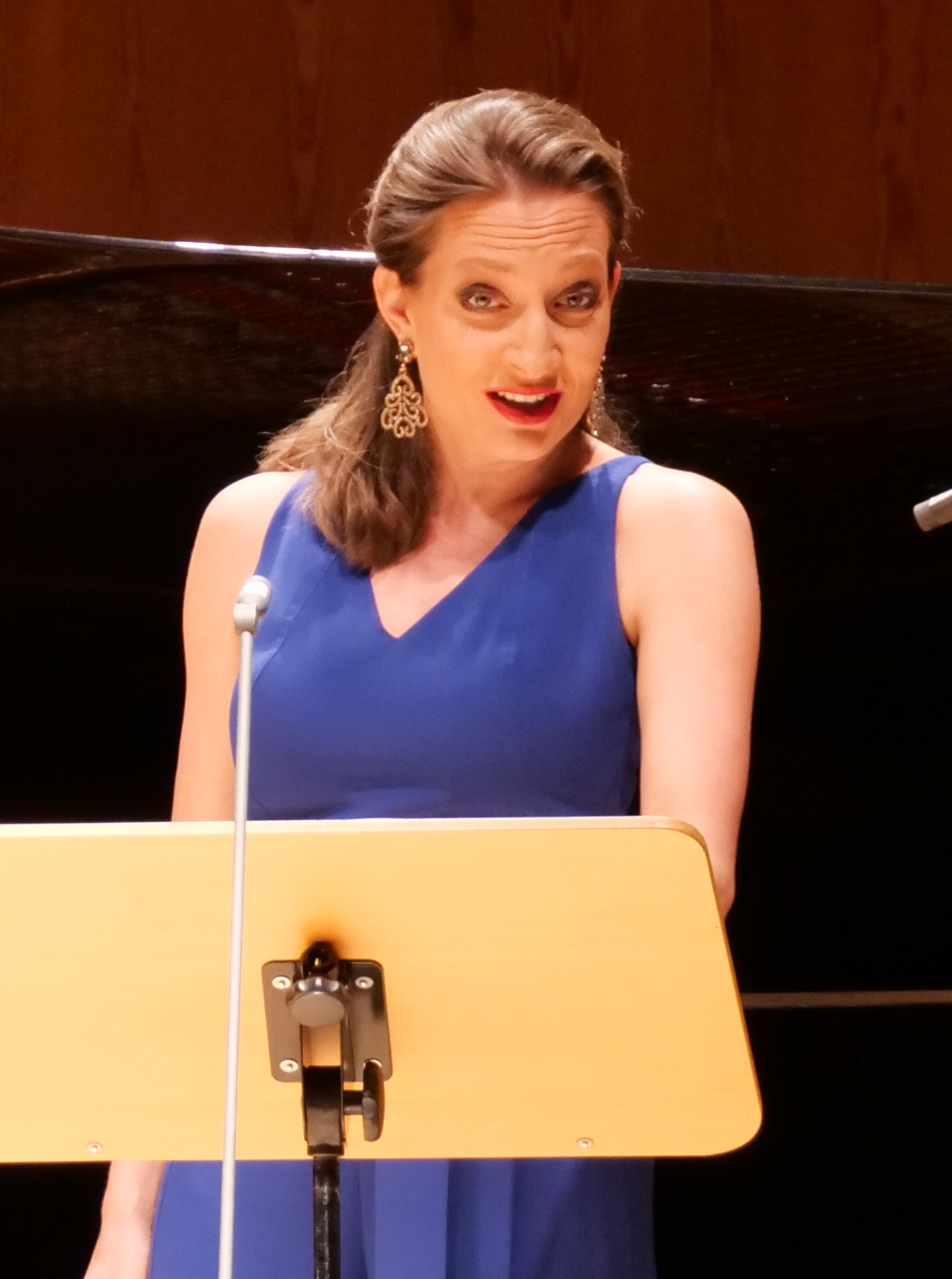
- Born: 6 August 1980 (age 46); Feuchtwangen, Germany
- Education: Mozarteum
- Occupation: Operatic soprano
- Organizations: Frankfurt Opera
- Awards: ECHO Klassik 2010 and 2016
- Website: www.christianekarg.com

Christiane Karg (born 6 August 1980) is a German operatic soprano. The award-winning singer became known for performing Mozart roles at the Salzburg Festival, and made an international career.

== Career ==
Born in Feuchtwangen, Bavaria, Karg studied at the Mozarteum University Salzburg, voice with Heiner Hopfner and Lied with Wolfgang Holzmair. She studied the Italian repertory for half a year at the conservatory of Verona. She graduated at the Mozarteum in 2008 and was awarded the Lilli Lehmann Medal. She took master classes with Grace Bumbry, Mirella Freni, Robert Holl and Ann Murray, among others.

Karg made her debut at the Salzburg Festival in 2006, as Melia in Mozart's Apollo et Hyacinthus and as Weltgeist in his Die Schuldigkeit des ersten Gebots. A year later she appeared there as Madame Silberklang in his Der Schauspieldirektor and in a title role of his Bastien und Bastienne.

From the 2008/09 season, Karg was a member of the Frankfurt Opera where she appeared as Susanna in Mozart's Le nozze di Figaro, as Pamina in his Die Zauberflöte, as Musetta in Puccini's La bohème, Zdenka in Arabella by Richard Strauss, and the title role in Debussy's Pelléas et Mélisande. She appeared as Sophie in Der Rosenkavalier by Strauss in Frankfurt conducted by Sebastian Weigle, at the Semperoper conducted by Christian Thielemann, and at La Scala. She made her debut at the Royal Opera House in 2015 as Pamina in Mozart's Die Zauberflöte.

She performed the solo soprano part in Mahler's Second Symphony in a performance of the Rheingau Musik Festival 2017 at Eberbach Abbey, conducted by Christoph Eschenbach, with Gerhild Romberger, the SWR Vokalensemble, Chor des Bayerischen Rundfunks and SWR Symphonieorchester.

== Awards ==
- 2007: Neue Stimmen (6th prize)
- 2008: Special Prize for Oratorio/Lied at the International singing competition "Tenor Viñas" of the Liceu in Barcelona
- 2008: Award of the Hamel Foundation at the Schleswig-Holstein Musik Festival
- 2009: Opernwelt Young Artist of the Year 2009
- 2010: Winner of the ECHO Klassik 2010 in the category "Young Artist", "singing"
- 2016: Winner of the ECHO Klassik 2016 in the category "Solistische Einspielung" (solo recording)
- 2018: Brahms-Preis

== Literature ==
- Ursula Ehrensberger: Das Porträt – Christiane Karg. In: Das Opernglas 2010, No. 3, ISSN 0935-6398, pp 26–30.
