= Benjamin Appl =

German-British baritone (born 1982)

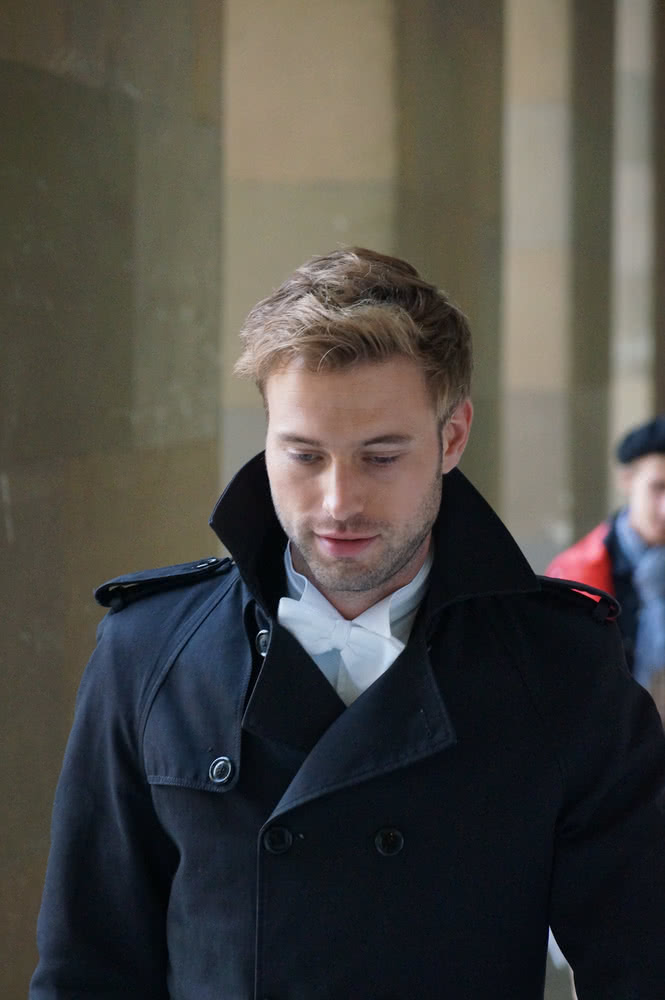
- Appl in Bressanone, 2017
- Born: 26 June 1982 (age 44); Regensburg, Bavaria, West Germany
- Education: Regensburger Domspatzen; Musikhochschule Augsburg; Musikhochschule München; Guildhall School of Music and Drama
- Occupations: Baritone; Academic teacher

Benjamin Appl (born 26 June 1982) is a German-British lyric baritone, a classical singer who has appeared worldwide in opera houses and concert halls, particularly known as a Lieder singer.

== Early life and education ==
Born in Regensburg, Appl has two older brothers, with whom he sang as a chorister with the Regensburger Domspatzen, the boys' choir at the Regensburg Cathedral, performing in concerts across Europe and Asia. Following secondary school, rather than spending a compulsory year in the army he completed his alternative community service working for the de in Regensburg, providing assistance to blind people in the community. He started training as a bank clerk at the de in Regensburg. He then studied business administration at the University of Regensburg, graduating in 2009 with a diploma. His diploma thesis, an empirical study of withdrawn initial public offerings, received the highest possible marks. He was awarded a scholarship from the Studienstiftung des deutschen Volkes between 2007 and 2012.

While studying for his management diploma, he auditioned at the Musikhochschule Augsburg for the soloist class taught by Edith Wiens. Under her tutelage, he continued his vocal training from 2008 at the Hochschule für Musik und Theater München, and at the opera class at Bayerische Theaterakademie August Everding, based at the Prinzregententheater. He also participated in Helmut Deutsch's Lieder class.

In 2009, Appl met Dietrich Fischer-Dieskau at a public masterclass of the Schubertiade in Schwarzenberg, Austria, which led to his receiving private lessons as his last student until Fischer-Dieskau's death in May 2012.

In 2010, Appl moved to London to study singing at the Guildhall School of Music and Drama with Rudolf Piernay, intending to study part-time while improving his English, before returning to a career in business in Germany after one year. However, he states that "London was quite life-changing", and he "made contact with great management companies, with Wigmore Hall, with some conductors" while still getting offers to return to the bank, but although "it was tempting to return to a safe haven", he eventually decided to pursue his vocal career. During this time, he attended masterclasses with Brigitte Fassbaender, Gerald Finley, Christian Gerhaher, Thomas Hampson, and Peter Schreier, among others. In 2019, he became a British citizen.

== Recitals ==
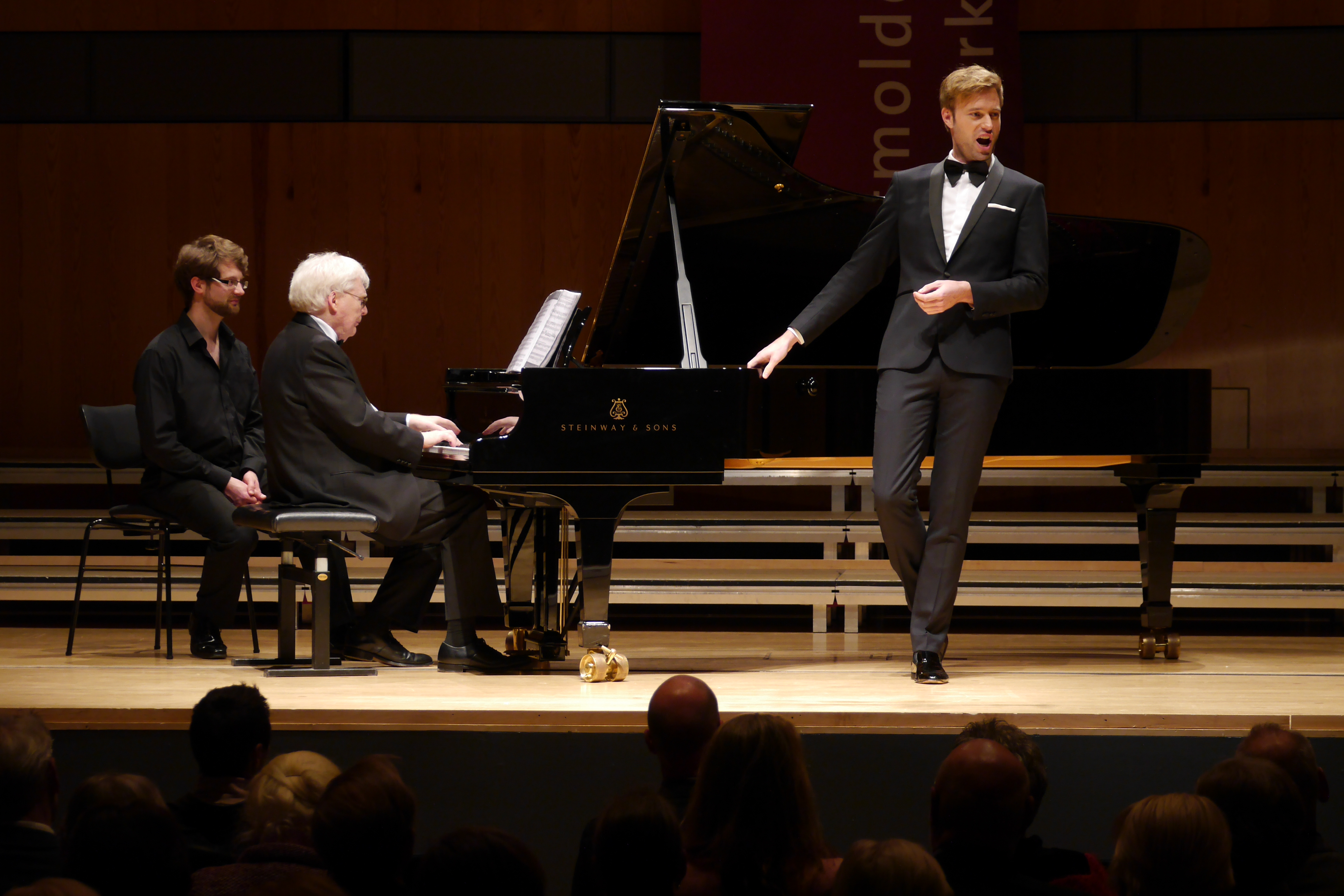
Appl performing a recital in Detmold, 7 November 2017

Appl has given recitals regularly at Wigmore Hall in London and the Schubertiade, and has performed at major venues including Festspielhaus Baden-Baden, Concertgebouw in Amsterdam, Elbphilharmonie in Hamburg, and the Musée du Louvre in Paris. He has performed at the Ravinia Festival, Rheingau Musik Festival, Schleswig-Holstein Musik Festival, Edinburgh International Festival, LIFE Victoria Festival Barcelona, Leeds Lieder and Oxford Lieder Festival. He has collaborated with pianists Graham Johnson and James Baillieu, and has also performed recitals with Kit Armstrong, Kristian Bezuidenhout, Helmut Deutsch, Julius Drake, Boris Giltburg, Pavel Kolesnikov, Simon Lepper, Malcolm Martineau, Wolfram Rieger, Martin Stadtfeld and Roger Vignoles. In an interview in 2024 Appl commented that the art song is "just the highest achievement I can have as an artist, in terms of being my own stage director, my own conductor, being in charge of every decision in every moment. The feeling of nakedness, of the direct communication, facing the audience, seeing them, not having the bright stage lights like in opera, or the pit between — it’s a brutal connection you have to have with the audience...."

On 13 March 2022 in Dortmund, Germany, with Lise de la Salle on piano, he premiered flower, forget me, songs by David Lang for baritone and piano. They were "commissioned by Konzerthaus Dortmund" for Appl, "specifically to go on a program with Schubert's great song cycle Die Schöne Müllerin". On 16 February 2025, he sang the work's United States premiere in Town Hall in Manhattan, with Shai Wosner on piano.

== Opera ==
While studying at the August Everding Academy, Appl took part in opera and operetta productions, including appearing as Ypsheim-Gindelbach in Wiener Blut, Falke in Die Fledermaus by Johann Strauß, Schaunard in Puccini's La bohème and Baron Tusenbach in Tri sestry by Peter Eötvös. In London, he performed the roles of the Count in Mozart's Le nozze di Figaro, Bustamente in La Navarraise, Chevalier des Grieux in Le portrait de Manon, Dr Cajus in Nicolai's Die lustigen Weiber von Windsor, and the title role in Britten's Owen Wingrave. Further opera roles include Guglielmo in Mozart's Così fan tutte and Papageno in Die Zauberflöte, Ottokar in Weber's Der Freischütz, Ernesto in Il mondo della luna, F. Scott Fitzgerald in Susan Oswell's Zelda, and Adonis in Venus and Adonis. He appeared as Leo in Bernhard Gander's Das Leben am Rande der Milchstraße for Bregenzer Festspiele and Konzerthaus Vienna, the King in Orff's Die Kluge, Aeneas in Purcell's Dido and Aeneas for the Aldeburgh Festival and Brighton Festival, and Tusenbach again for the Berlin State Opera. In 2019, Appl performed the role of Guglielmo in Così fan tutte with The Mozartists, conducted by Ian Page. In 2021 he was Harlequin in Ariadne auf Naxos at the Gran Teatre del Liceu, as well as Jesus in a semi-staged St John Passion at the Théâtre du Châtelet in Paris.

== Concerts ==
Appl has performed in concert with orchestras including the Academy of Ancient Music, Akademie für Alte Musik Berlin, the Bach-Collegium Stuttgart, Concerto Köln, Deutsche Kammerphilharmonie Bremen, the Dunedin Consort, Gabrieli Consort & Players, Sofia Philharmonic Orchestra, Les Violons du Roy, London Philharmonic Orchestra, NHK Symphony Orchestra, NDR Radiophilharmonie, Philadelphia Orchestra, the Royal Liverpool Philharmonic, Philharmonia Orchestra, the Seattle Symphony, the Symphony Orchestra of India, Vienna Symphony, and on multiple occasions with the major BBC Orchestras and Singers. He made his Proms debut in September 2015 singing Triumphlied by Brahms with Marin Alsop and the Orchestra of the Age of Enlightenment, and Orff's Carmina Burana with the BBC Concert Orchestra five days later. In December 2017, he performed alongside Diana Damrau in the ZDF Advent Concert at the Dresden Frauenkirche with the Staatskapelle Dresden conducted by Christian Thielemann, broadcast on national television. He has also performed regularly at the Hamburg State Opera, singing for several of John Neumeier's productions for the Hamburg Ballet.

== Awards ==
In 2012, Appl was awarded the German Schubert Society's German Schubert Prize.

Appl was a member of the BBC Radio 3 New Generation Artists scheme between 2014 and 2016. During the season 2015/16 he performed as an ECHO Rising Star, nominated by the Barbican Centre London, in some of Europe's most renowned concert halls including Het Concertgebouw Amsterdam, Philharmonie de Paris, Philharmonie Luxembourg and Kölner Philharmonie, Calouste Gulbenkian Foundation, Palau de la Música Catalana, Stockholm Concert Hall, Konzerthaus, Vienna, BOZAR Brussels and Laeiszhalle Hamburg. He also became a Wigmore Hall Emerging Talent in 2015.

Gramophone Classical Music Awards named him Young Artist of the Year in 2016. His debut album as an exclusive Sony Classical recording artist, "Heimat", won the Prix Dietrich Fischer-Dieskau (Best Lieder Singer) at the 2017/18 Académie du disque lyrique Orphées d'Or.

In 2025 he won the Bavarian Art Prize ('Bayerischer Kunstpreis') in the category "Voice".

== Repertoire ==
Benjamin Appl has a vast and varied song catalogue, but his repertoire also encompasses opera and concert works from the Renaissance through to the present day. He has been fortunate enough to have performed works written specifically for him by composers including Kit Armstrong, Marian Ingoldsby, György Kurtág, Nico Muhly, Susan Oswell and Matthias Pintscher. For the Konzerthaus Dortmund he participated over months in intensive working sessions with György Kurtág on his Hölderlin Gesänge, which were then performed in a special lecture recital in Dortmund in February 2020. Kurtág, who according to Appl "took on a little bit the role of Fischer-Dieskau" and in 2024 the baritone recorded works by Kurtág with the composer playing some Schubert songs on the piano.

== Teaching ==
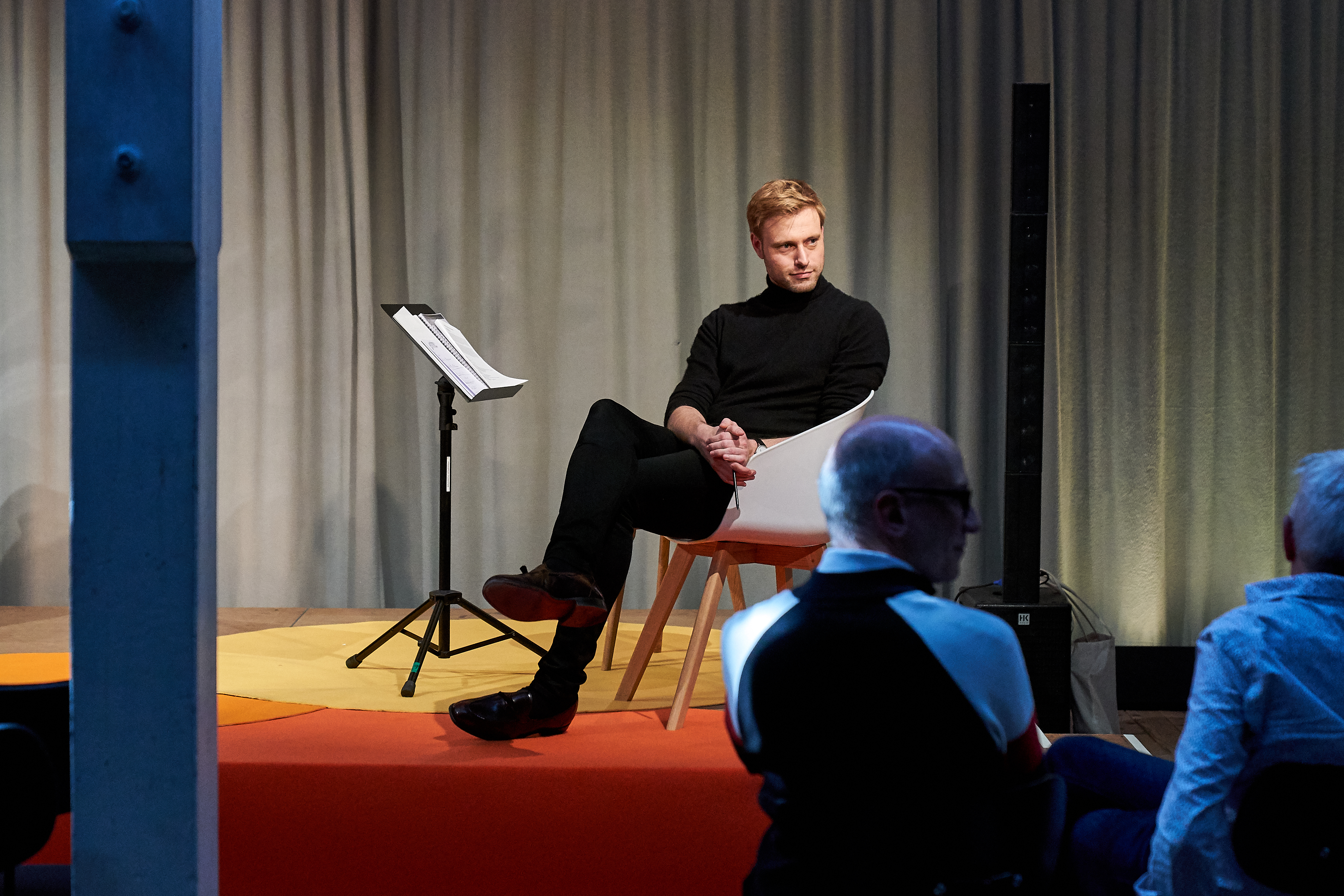
Appl giving a masterclass in Basel in May 2019

Since September 2016 Benjamin Appl has taught at the Guildhall School of Music & Drama in London as a professor of German song. He has given masterclasses in Germany, Hong Kong, India, Ireland, Italy, Portugal, Switzerland, United Kingdom, the U.S. and Vietnam.

== Recordings ==
- Felix Mendelssohn: Complete Songs with pianist Malcolm Martineau, Champs Hill Records, vol. 1 in 2014, vol. 2 in 2015
- Robert Schumann: Lieder and Duets, with Ann Murray (mezzo-soprano) and pianist Malcolm Martineau, Linn Records, 2016
- Stunden, Tage, Ewigkeiten, songs with settings of Heinrich Heine, with pianist James Baillieu, Champs Hill, 2016
- Franz Schubert: Songs, live-Recording with pianist Graham Johnson, Wigmore Hall Live, 2016
- Georg Philipp Telemann: Reformation Oratorio 1755 TWV 13:18, Chor des Bayerischen Rundfunks, Bayerische Kammerphilharmonie, conducted by Reinhard Goebel, Sony Classical, 2017
- Heimat, with pianist James Baillieu, Sony Classical, 2017
- Johannes Brahms: The Complete Songs, vol. 7 with pianist Graham Johnson, Hyperion Records, 2018
- Johann Sebastian Bach: Arias and Sinfonias, Concerto Köln, Sony Classical, 2018
- Sibelius: Kullervo, with Helena Juntunen (soprano), BBC Scottish Symphony Orchestra, conducted by Thomas Dausgaard, Hyperion Records, 2019
- Luciano Berio: Transformation, arrangements of early songs by Gustav Mahler, Sinfonieorchester Basel, conducted by Ivor Bolton, Sony Classical, 2019
- Fauré: The Secret Fauré III – Requiem, Op. 48, Balthasar-Neumann-Chor, Sinfonieorchester Basel, conducted by Ivor Bolton, Sony Classical, 2020
- Cantatas of the Bach Family, solo cantatas for bass by Carl Philipp Emanuel Bach, Johann Christoph Friedrich Bach and Johann Sebastian Bach, Berliner Barocksolisten, conducted by Reinhard Goebel, Hänssler Classic, 2020
- Forbidden Fruit, with James Baillieu (piano) — songs by Lothar Brühne, Leonello Casucci, Debussy, Fauré, Grieg, Ivor Gurney, Hahn, Jake Heggie, Mahler, Fanny Mendelssohn, Poulenc, Roger Quilter, Schoenberg, Schubert, Schumann, Richard Strauss, Kurt Weill, and Wolf. Alpha, 2023
- Lines of Life, with James Baillieu, Pierre-Laurent Aimard, and György Kurtág on piano — songs by Schubert, Brahms, and György Kurtág. Alpha, 2025.
- For Dieter – Hommage a Dietrich Fischer-Dieskau, with James Baillieu. Alpha, 2025.

== Other projects ==
In autumn 2019 Benjamin Appl presented his own programme on BBC Radio 3 called A Singer's World, in which he gave insight into the life of a classical singer in the 21st century. In spring 2020 Appl was involved in a new movie project called Breaking Music, which was filmed during his visits of Buenos Aires and Berlin to discover tango, its history and similarities with as well as differences to Lieder.

In 2022, Appl, accompanied by James Baillieu, appeared in the BBC film Winter Journey, featuring Schubert’s Winterreise, filmed in a tower on the summit of the Julierpass in Switzerland.

In 2025, Appl released For Dieter – Hommage a Dietrich Fischer-Dieskau, a book with a CD containing 32 Lieder tracks in it.
