= Mark Stone (baritone) =

- Born: 12 June 1969 (age 57); London, England
- Genres: Classical
- Occupation: Singer (baritone)
- Years active: 1998–present
- Website: www.markstone.info

Mark Stone (born 12 June 1969) is a British baritone appearing in concerts, recitals, and opera.

== Biography ==
=== Early life ===
Born in London, England, he studied at Wilson's School, Wallington, London, before going up to King's College, Cambridge to read mathematics. After graduating in 1990, he worked as a Chartered Accountant and as an investment banker before studying singing at the Guildhall School of Music and Drama, London from 1995 to 1998.

=== Performing ===
He made his operatic debut in 1998, singing the role of Escamillo for Opera North, since when he has also appeared in the UK at the Royal Opera House, English National Opera, Glyndebourne and Welsh National Opera. He made his U.S. debut for the Opera Company of Philadelphia and went on to sing at Santa Fe Opera. Elsewhere he has sung for La Scala (Milan), Opera Nationale de Montpellier, Liceu (Barcelona), Deutsche Oper Berlin, Cologne Opera, Leipzig Opera, the Royal Swedish Opera, Nationale Reisoper (Enschede), Israeli Opera and New Zealand Opera.

In 2016 he premiered the role of The Count in Elena Langer's opera Figaro Gets a Divorce, for Welsh National Opera.

He appears regularly in concert, having sung with the London Symphony Orchestra, the Hallé Orchestra, the Academy of Ancient Music, the Oxford Lieder Festival, the Philharmonia Orchestra, the BBC Concert Orchestra, the City of Birmingham Symphony Orchestra, the Bamberg Symphony Orchestra, the Munich Radio Orchestra, the Danish National Symphony Orchestra, the Berlin Radio Symphony Orchestra (East Berlin), the Orquesta Sinfónica de Castilla y Léon and the Orquesta Sinfónica de Galicia.

=== Record producing ===
In 2008 he formed the CD label Stone Records. Originally created to release his own recordings, the label expanded, as Stone began to release discs from other artists, and the catalogue now includes vocal, choral, orchestral and instrumental music. Artists include American guitarist Aaron Larget-Caplan with the 2015 issue of 'The Legend of Hagoromo'.

== Repertoire ==
=== Operatic ===
Composer	Opera	Role	Performed
Adams	Nixon in China	Chou En-lai	English National Opera
Adès	The Tempest	Sebastian	Concertgebouw
Alfano	Cyrano de Bergerac	Valvert	Royal Opera House
Argento	The Aspern Papers	The lodger	Guildhall School of Music and Drama
Bellini	La straniera	Valdeburgo	Opera Rara
Berlioz	Béatrice et Bénédict	Claudio	Welsh National Opera
Berlioz	Les Troyens	Chef grec	London Symphony Orchestra
Bernstein	Candide	Maximillian	English National Opera
Bizet	Carmen	Escamillo	Opera North
Bizet	Djamileh	Splendiano	Opera North
Britten	Albert Herring	Sid	British Youth Opera, Kammeroper Schloss Rheinsberg
Britten	A Midsummer Night's Dream	Demetrius	Opera North
Britten	Billy Budd	Bosun	London Symphony Orchestra
Britten	Curlew River	Ferryman	Barbican Centre,
Britten	Gloriana	Mountjoy	Opera North, Royal Opera House
Britten	Peter Grimes	Ned Keane	London Philharmonic Orchestra
Britten	The Rape of Lucretia	Junius	Britten-Pears Orchestra
De Falla	La vida breve	Manuel	Opera North
Donizetti	Il campanello	Enrico	Buxton Festival
Donizetti	L'elisir d'amore	Belcore	Welsh National Opera
Donizetti	Lucia di Lammermoor	Enrico	Opera Holland Park, English National Opera,
Dove	Man on the moon	Gene Kranz	Channel 4
Gluck	Iphigénie en Tauride	Oreste	Pina Bausch
Gluck	Alceste	High Priest	Woodbridge Festival
Handel	Acis and Galatea	Polyphemus	Gabrieli Consort
Handel	La resurezzione	Lucifero	Opera Atelier
Handel	Serse	Elviro	Royal Swedish Opera
Handel	Tolomeo	Araspe	Broomhill Opera
Haydn	La fedeltà premiata	Melibeo	Guildhall School of Music and Drama
Janáček	The Cunning Little Vixen	Harašta	Opera North
Willem Jeths	Hôtel de Pékin	Baritone	Concertgebouw
Lehár	Die lustige Witwe	Danilo	Opéra national de Montpellier
Martinů	Ariane	Thesée	Guildhall School of Music and Drama
Leoncavallo	I pagliacci	Silvio	Opera North, English National Opera
Mascagni	Cavalleria rusticana	Alfio	English Touring Opera
Massenet	Manon	Lescaut	Opera North
Messager	Veronique	Florestan	Buxton Festival
Mozart	Così fan tutte	Guglielmo	British Youth Opera, Opera Holland Park, Grange Park Opera, Santa Fe Opera, English National Opera
Mozart	Die Zauberflöte	Papageno	Opera Company of Philadelphia,
Mozart	Don Giovanni	Don Giovanni	Opera Company of Philadelphia, Opéra national de Montpellier, Dartington Festival, Opera North, English National Opera, Deutsche Oper Berlin, Hamburg Opera, The NBR New Zealand Opera
Mozart	Le nozze di Figaro	Il Conte d'Almaviva	Opera Holland Park, English National Opera, Classical Opera Company, Cologne OperaTampere Opera
Mozart	Le nozze di Figaro	Figaro	Garsington Opera, The NBR New Zealand Opera
Mozart	Le nozze di Figaro	Bartolo	Britten-Pears Orchestra
Prokofiev	The Gambler	Mr Astley	Royal Opera House
Puccini	Gianni Schicchi	Gianni Schicchi	Opera Company of Philadelphia
Puccini	La bohème	Marcello	Opera North, Grange Park Opera, English National Opera
Puccini	La fanciulla del West	Sonora	Royal Opera House
Puccini	Madama Butterfly	Yamadori	English National Opera
Puccini	Manon Lescaut	Lescaut	Leipzig Opera
Rossini	Guillaume Tell	Guillaume Tell	Orquesta Sinfónica de Castilla y Léon
Rossini	Il barbiere di Siviglia	Figaro	Guildhall School of Music and Drama, English National Opera, Opera Holland Park
Rossini	Il campanello	Enrico	Buxton Festival
Rossini	L'occasione fa il ladro	Parmenione	Opera North
Rossini	Il turco in Italia	Prosdocimo	Garsington Opera
Sawer	Skin Deep	Luke Pollock	Opera North
Saint-Saëns	Samson et Dalila	Second Philistine	London Symphony Orchestra
Sondheim	Sweeney Todd	Sweeney Todd	Munich Radio Orchestra
Strauss, J	Die Fledermaus	Eisenstein	Welsh National Opera
Strauss, R	Ariadne auf Naxos	Musiklehrer	Dartington Festival
Strauss, R	Intermezzo	Robert Storch	Garsington Opera
Strauss, R	Der Rosenkavalier	Faninal	City of Birmingham Symphony Orchestra
Sullivan	The Yeomen of the Guard	Jack Point	BBC Proms
Tchaikovsky	Eugene Onegin	Onegin	Glyndebourne, Israeli Opera, Opera Holland Park
Tchaikovsky	Iolanta	Robert	Opera Holland Park
Tchaikovsky	Pique dame	Yeletsky	Opéra national de Montpellier, Opera Holland Park
Tippett	King Priam	Hector	Nationale Reisopera, Brighton Festival
Verdi	Falstaff	Ford	Opera Company of Philadelphia
Verdi	La forza del destino	Don Carlo	Opera Holland Park
Verdi	La traviata	Germont	Opera Company of Philadelphia
Wagner	Die Feen	Morald	Chelsea Opera Group
Weber	Der Freischütz	Ottokar	Opéra national de Montpellier

=== Concert ===
Composer	Works
Adès	Totentanz
Auerbach	Dresden Requiem
Bach, J.S.	B Minor Mass, Christmas Oratorio, St John Passion, St Matthew Passion
Bach, C.P.E.	Magnificat
Brahms	A German Requiem
Britten	War Requiem
Carr	Requiem for an Angel
Corp	And all the Trumpets Sounded
Delius	Sea Drift
Duruflé	Requiem
Elgar	The Apostles, Coronation Ode, The Dream of Gerontius
Fauré	Requiem
Glass	Symphony No. 5
Handel	Messiah
Haydn	Nelson Mass
MacMillan	John Passion
Mahler	Symphony No. 8
Martin	Golgotha
Mendelssohn	Elijah
Mozart	Mass in C, Mass in C minor, Requiem
Orff	Carmina Burana
Rachmaninov	The Bells
Rossini	Petite Messe Solenelle, Stabat Mater
Puccini	Messa di Gloria
Tippett	A Child of our Time
Vaughan Williams	A Sea Symphony, Serenade to Music
Walton	Belshazzar's Feast

== Discography ==
Year	Title	With	Label
2014	The complete Quilter songbook Vol.II	Stephen Barlow	Stone Records
2014	The complete John Ireland songbook Vol.I	Sholto Kynoch	Stone Records
2013	The complete Quilter songbook Vol.I	Stephen Barlow	Stone Records
2013	Roxanna Panufnik's Love Abide	London Mozart Players, Lee Ward	Warner Classics
2012	Sondheim's Sweeney Todd	Münchner Rundfunkorchester, Ulf Schirmer	BR-Klassik
2012	The runaway bunny	Catherine Zeta-Jones, Michael Douglas, Glen Roven	GPR Records
2012	Requiem Æternam (Duruflé's Requiem)	The Choir of Somerville College Oxford, David Crown	Stone Records
2012	The complete C.W. Orr songbook - volume 2	Simon Lepper	Stone Records
2012	Britten's War Requiem	Radio Filharmonisch Orkest, Jaap van Zweden	Challenge Classics
2012	The complete Havergal Brian songbook - volume 1	Sholto Kynoch	Stone Records
2011	The complete C.W. Orr songbook - volume 1	Simon Lepper	Stone Records
2011	The complete Delius songbook - volume 2	Stephen Barlow	Stone Records
2011	Ronald Corp's And all the Trumpets Sounded	Bournemouth Symphony Orchestra, Ronald Corp	Dutton
2011	The complete Delius songbook - volume 1	Stephen Barlow	Stone Records
2011	Time to Time	Onyx Brass	Meridian Records
2010	In my craft or sullen art	Glen Roven	GPR Records
2010	Paul Carr: Requiem for an Angel	Bath Philharmonia, Gavin Carr	Stone Records
2010	The songs of Ronald Corp	Simon Lepper	Stone Records
2010	The complete Butterworth songbook	Stephen Barlow	Stone Records
2010	Offenbach's Vert-Vert	Philharmonia Orchestra, David Parry	Opera Rara
2009	Gibbs' Odysseus	BBC Concert Orchestra, David Drummond	Dutton
2009	English love	Stephen Barlow	Stone Records
2008	Britten's Billy Budd	London Symphony Orchestra, Daniel Harding	Virgin Records
2008	Bellini's La Straniera	Philharmonia Orchestra, David Parry	Opera Rara
2007	The complete Quilter songbook Vol.I	Stephen Barlow	Sony BMG
2007	Entre Nous (Offenbach compilation)	Philharmonia Orchestra, David Parry	Opera Rara
2007	The A to Z of Mozart opera	Classical Opera Company, Ian Page	Sony BMG
2007	Tchaikovsky Overtures and Fantasies	Orchestra dell'Accademia Nazionale di Santa Cecilia, Antonio Pappano	EMI
2007	La Serenata	David Harper	Opera Rara
2006	Ora Divina	David Harper	Opera Rara
2001	Berlioz's Les Troyens	London Symphony Orchestra, Sir Colin Davis	LSO Live
2000	The Magic of Inspector Morse	Exeter College Choir, Barrington Pheloung	Virgin Records
