= Royal Philharmonic Society Music Awards =

UK annual awards for live classical music

- Awarded for: "live classical music-making in the United Kingdom."
- Sponsored by: Royal Philharmonic Society
- Location: London
- Country: United Kingdom
- Presented by: Royal Philharmonic Society and BBC Radio 3
- Reward: Handcrafted silver lyre trophy made by silversmith Julie Jones
- First award: 1989
- Website: Official Webpage

The Royal Philharmonic Society Music Awards are given annually for live classical music-making in the United Kingdom. The awards were first held in 1989 and are independent of any commercial interest.

Since 2003, BBC Radio 3 has been the media partners of the awards and all the winners are celebrated in a full-length "Performance on 3" broadcast.

The Royal Philharmonic Society, founded in 1813, is a registered UK Charity dedicated to creating a future for music. It is one of the world's oldest music societies with a membership including both professional musicians and music lovers. Nominations for its awards are invited annually from members of the society, members of the music profession and UK musical organisations. Each category is decided by an independent jury who is asked to judge the nominations on the criteria of creativity, excellence and understanding. Recipients each receive a handcrafted silver lyre trophy made by the silversmith Julie Jones.

Thirteen awards are given annually with categories for performers, composers, programmers, audience engagement, communication and learning and participation. There is no restriction on the nationality of recipients. The awards are presented each May at a dinner in London. Each year the presentation is made by an eminent musician and a distinguished cultural figure is invited to address the guests. Recent speakers have included Dame Liz Forgan, Richard Holloway, Nicholas Hytner, Jude Kelly, Alan Rusbridger, Armando Iannucci, Neil MacGregor, Grayson Perry, Mark Ravenhill and Gareth Malone.

== Winner ==
=== Instrumentalist ===
- 1990 Håkan Hardenberger
- 1991 Evelyn Glennie
- 1992 Geoffrey Parsons
- 1993 Steven Isserlis
- 1994 Iona Brown
- 1995 András Schiff
- 1996 Itzhak Perlman
- 1997 Julian Bream
- 1998 Murray Perahia
- 1999 Graham Johnson
- 2000 Leif Ove Andsnes
- 2001 Piotr Anderszewski
- 2002 Thomas Trotter
- 2003 Paul Lewis
- 2004 Mitsuko Uchida
- 2005 Pierre-Laurent Aimard
- 2006 Anthony Marwood
- 2007 Michael Collins
- 2008 Imogen Cooper
- 2009 Janine Jansen
- 2010 Stephen Hough
- 2011 Leon Fleisher
- 2012 Maurizio Pollini
- 2013 Steven Osborne
- 2014 Patricia Kopatchinskaja
- 2015 Colin Currie
- 2016 Daniil Trifonov
- 2017 James Ehnes
- 2018 Igor Levit
- 2019 Alina Ibragimova
- 2020 Lawrence Power
- 2021 Nicola Benedetti
- 2023 Abel Selaocoe
- 2024 Jasdeep Singh Degun
- 2025 Laura van der Heijden

=== Conductor ===
- 1990 Simon Rattle
- 1991 Andrew Davis
- 1992 Klaus Tennstedt
- 1993 Edward Downes
- 1994 Colin Davis
- 1995 Nikolaus Harnoncourt
- 1996 Richard Hickox
- 1997 Richard Armstrong
- 1998 Esa-Pekka Salonen
- 1999 Bernard Haitink
- 2000 Sir Charles Mackerras
- 2001 Pierre Boulez
- 2002 Osmo Vänskä
- 2003 Marin Alsop
- 2004 Mariss Jansons
- 2005 Antonio Pappano
- 2006 Mark Elder
- 2007 Vladimir Jurowski
- 2008 Edward Gardner
- 2009 Valery Gergiev
- 2010 Oliver Knussen
- 2011 Iván Fischer
- 2012 Claudio Abbado
- 2013 Kirill Karabits
- 2014 Daniel Barenboim
- 2015 Andris Nelsons
- 2016 Sakari Oramo
- 2017 Richard Farnes
- 2018 Vladimir Jurowski
- 2019 Mirga Gražinytė-Tyla
- 2020 Dalia Stasevska
- 2021 Ryan Bancroft
- 2023 Martyn Brabbins
- 2024 François-Xavier Roth
- 2025 Kazuki Yamada

=== Singer ===
- 1990 Philip Langridge
- 1991 Anne Sofie von Otter
- 1992 John Tomlinson
- 1993 Julia Varady
- 1994 Galina Gorchakova
- 1995 Simon Keenlyside
- 1996 Anthony Michaels-Moore
- 1997 Bryn Terfel
- 1998 Joan Rodgers
- 1999 John Tomlinson
- 2000 David Daniels
- 2001 Gerald Finley
- 2002 Violeta Urmana
- 2003 Lisa Saffer
- 2004 Susan Chilcott ([posthumous)
- 2005 Ben Heppner
- 2006 Joyce DiDonato
- 2007 John Mark Ainsley
- 2008 John Tomlinson
- 2009 Susan Bullock
- 2010 Philip Langridge
- 2011 Susan Bickley
- 2012 Toby Spence
- 2013 Sarah Connolly
- 2014 Joyce DiDonato
- 2015 Christian Gerhaher
- 2016 Roderick Williams
- 2017 Karita Mattila
- 2018 Allan Clayton
- 2019 Nina Stemme
- 2020 Natalya Romaniw
- 2021 Jennifer Johnston
- 2023 Anna Dennis
- 2024 Nicky Spence
- 2025 Claire Booth

=== Large-Scale Composition ===
- 1990 Olivier Messiaen
- 1991 Poul Ruders
- 1992 Harrison Birtwistle
- 1993 Magnus Lindberg
- 1994 Witold Lutoslawski
- 1995 Peter Maxwell Davies
- 1996 Michael Tippett
- 1997 Colin Matthews
- 1998 Thomas Adès
- 1999 Henri Dutilleux
- 2000 Gérard Grisey
- 2001 Wolfgang Rihm
- 2002 Peter Eötvös
- 2003 George Benjamin
- 2004 Harrison Birtwistle
- 2005 Thomas Adès: The Tempest
- 2006 Julian Anderson: The Book of Hours
- 2007 Jonathan Harvey: ...towards a pure land
- 2008 Thomas Adès: Tevot
- 2009 George Benjamin: Into the Little Hill
- 2010 Kaija Saariaho: Notes on Light
- 2011 James Dillon: Nine Rivers
- 2012 Jonathan Harvey: Messages
- 2013 Gerald Barry: The Importance of Being Earnest
- 2014 George Benjamin: Written On Skin
- 2015 Hans Abrahamsen: Let me tell you...
- 2016 Luca Francesconi: Duende, The Dark Notes: violin concerto
- 2017 Philip Venables: 4.48 Psychosis
- 2018 Mark-Anthony Turnage: Hibiki
- 2019 Rebecca Saunders: Yes
- 2020 Frank Denyer: The Fish that Became the Sun (Songs of the Dispossessed)
- 2021 Dani Howard: Trombone Concerto
- 2023 Gavin Higgins: Concerto Grosso for Brass Band and Orchestra
- 2024 Kaija Saariaho: 'Innocence'
- 2025 Katherine Balch: 'whisper concerto'

=== Chamber-Scale Composition ===
- 1990 Simon Holt
- 1991 Harrison Birtwistle
- 1992 Barry Guy
- 1993 Oliver Knussen
- 1994 John Adams
- 1995 Luciano Berio
- 1996 Brian Ferneyhough
- 1997 Elliott Carter: String Quartet No. 5
- 1998 James Dillon
- 1999 Pierre Boulez
- 2000 Hans Werner Henze
- 2001 György Ligeti
- 2002 Simon Holt
- 2003 James Dillon
- 2004 Helmut Lachenmann
- 2005 Howard Skempton
- 2006 James Dillon: String Quartet No. 4
- 2007 Richard Causton: Phoenix
- 2008 Rebecca Saunders: Stirrings Still
- 2009 Harrison Birtwistle: The Tree of Strings
- 2010 Kevin Volans
- 2011 Brian Ferneyhough: String Quartet No. 6
- 2012 Sally Beamish: Reed Stanzas (String Quartet No. 3)
- 2013 Rebecca Saunders: Fletch
- 2014 Harrison Birtwistle: The Moth Requiem
- 2015 Graham Fitkin: Distil
- 2016 Julian Anderson: Van Gogh Blue
- 2017 Rebecca Saunders: Skin
- 2018 James Dillon: Tanz/haus Triptych 2017
- 2019 Tansy Davies: Cave
- 2020 Naomi Pinnock: I am, I am
- 2021 Laura Bowler: Wicked Problems
- 2023 Ben Nobuto: SERENITY 2.0
- 2024 Laurence Osborn: 'TOMB!'
- 2025 Sarah Lianne Lewis: 'letting the light in'

=== Ensemble ===
Source: From 2005, the Large Ensemble Award was renamed the Ensemble Award and opened to any group of three players or more.

- 1990 London Symphony Orchestra
- 1991 English National Opera Orchestra
- 1992 BBC Philharmonic
- 1993 National Youth Orchestra of Great Britain
- 1994 Bournemouth Symphony Orchestra
- 1995 Philharmonia Orchestra
- 1996 Welsh National Opera Orchestra
- 1997 City of London Sinfonia
- 1998 City of Birmingham Symphony Orchestra
- 1999 Westminster Cathedral Choir
- 2000 BBC Symphony Orchestra
- 2001 London Symphony Orchestra
- 2002 BBC Scottish Symphony Orchestra
- 2003 London Sinfonietta
- 2004 West–Eastern Divan Orchestra and Daniel Barenboim
- 2005 The Hallé
- 2006 I Fagiolini
- 2007 Britten Sinfonia
- 2008 Orchestra of the Age of Enlightenment
- 2009 Royal Liverpool Philharmonic & Ensemble 10/10
- 2010 London Sinfonietta
- 2011 Aurora Orchestra
- 2012 National Youth Choir of Scotland
- 2013 Britten Sinfonia
- 2014 London Philharmonic Orchestra
- 2015 London Contemporary Orchestra
- 2016 National Youth Orchestra of Great Britain
- 2017 Manchester Camerata
- 2018 The Sixteen
- 2019 Aurora Orchestra
- 2020 Scottish Ensemble
- 2021 Dunedin Consort
- 2023 Manchester Collective
- 2024 BBC Singers
- 2025 Paraorchestra
