= List of compositions by Thomas Adès =

This is a list of compositions by the composer Thomas Adès sorted by genre, date of composition, title and scoring.

Genre	Date	Title	Scoring	Notes
Vocal	1989	The Lover in Winter	for countertenor and piano	
Vocal	1990	Five Eliot Landscapes	for soprano and piano	words by T. S. Eliot
Vocal	1990	Aubade	for soprano solo	words by Philip Larkin
Orchestral	1990	Chamber Symphony	for chamber ensemble of 15 players	
Choral	1990	O thou who didst with pitfall and gin	anthem for male voices	words from Rubaiyat of Omar Khayyam translated by Edward FitzGerald
Choral	1990	Gefriolsae Me	anthem for male voices and organ	words from Psalm 51
Chamber	1991	Catch	for clarinet, violin, cello and piano	
Choral	1992	Fool's Rhymes	for mixed chorus, harp, prepared piano, organ and percussion	words from sermons of John Donne, anonymous Elizabethan and 14th-century poetry
Organ	1992	Under Hamelin Hill	for organ (1–3 players)	
Piano	1992	Darknesse Visible	for piano	after John Dowland
Chamber	1992	Le Diable au Corps	for oboe, bassoon and piano	withdrawn
Piano	1992	Still Sorrowing	for piano	
Vocal	1993	Life Story	for soprano, 2 bass clarinets and double bass	words by Tennessee Williams
Orchestral	1993	Living Toys	for chamber ensemble of 14 players	
Orchestral	1993	...but all shall be well	for orchestra	2nd version for reduced orchestra
Chamber	1993	Sonata da Caccia	for baroque oboe (or oboe), horn, harpsichord	
Chamber	1994	Les baricades mistérieuses	for clarinet, bass clarinet, viola, cello and double bass	arrangement of music by François Couperin
Vocal	1994	Life Story	for soprano and piano	words by Tennessee Williams
Orchestral	1994	The Origin of the Harp	for chamber ensemble of 10 players	
Chamber	1994	Arcadiana	for 2 violins, viola and cello	
Chamber	1995	Cardiac Arrest	for clarinet, bass clarinet, viola, cello, double bass and piano 4-hands	
Opera	1995	Powder Her Face	for soloists and ensemble of 15 players	libretto by Philip Hensher; in 2 acts and 8 scenes
Piano	1996	Traced Overhead	for piano	
Piano	1996	Etude	for piano	withdrawn
Orchestral	1996	These Premises Are Alarmed	for orchestra	
Orchestral	1997	Asyla	for orchestra	winner of the 2000 Grawemeyer Award for Music Composition
Concertante	1997	Concerto Conciso	for piano and 10 players	
Choral	1997	The Fayrfax Carol	for mixed chorus with optional organ	words by 15th-century anonymous poets
Vocal	1999	America: A Prophecy	for mezzo-soprano and orchestra with chorus ad libitum	words adapted from Chilam Balam, and La Guerra by Matteo Flexa
Choral	1999	January Writ	for mixed chorus and organ	
Chamber	2000	Piano Quintet	for 2 violins, viola, cello and piano	
Cello	2000	Sola	for cello	
Vocal	2001	Brahms	for baritone and orchestra	words by Alfred Brendel
Opera	2003	The Tempest	for soloists, chorus and orchestra	libretto by Meredith Oakes based on the play by William Shakespeare; in 3 acts
Orchestral	2004	Overture to The Tempest	for orchestra	
Vocal	2004	Scenes from The Tempest	for Soloists and orchestra	
Concertante	2005	Violin Concerto	for violin and chamber orchestra	subtitled "Concentric Paths"
Chamber	2005	Court Studies from The Tempest	for clarinet, violin, cello and piano	
Orchestral	2006	Three Studies from Couperin	for chamber orchestra	after music by François Couperin
Orchestral	2007	Tevot	for orchestra	
Orchestral	2007	Three-Piece Suite from Powder Her Face	for orchestra	orchestral suite no. 1 from the opera Powder Her Face
Concertante	2008	In Seven Days	for piano and orchestra	with moving image by Tal Rosner
Piano	2009	Concert Paraphrase on Powder Her Face	for piano	
Chamber	2009	Lieux Retrouvés	for cello and piano	
Piano	2009	Three Mazurkas	for piano	
Choral	2009	Singverein	for chorus and orchestra	withdrawn
Chamber	2010	The Four Quarters	for 2 violins, viola and cello	
Orchestral	2010	Polaris	for orchestra	with moving image by Tal Rosner
Violin	2011	Cadenza to the violin concerto by György Ligeti	for solo violin	
Chamber	2011	Reveilles	for trumpet and piano	
Vocal	2012	Come unto these yellow sands	for countertenor and piano	Henry Purcell, realised by Thomas Adès for voice and piano
Vocal	2012	Full Fathom Five	for countertenor and piano	Purcell, realised by Thomas Adès for voice and piano
Piano	2012	Thrift	for piano	Mazurka-Cortège
Vocal	2013	Totentanz	for mezzo-soprano, baritone and orchestra	
Piano	2015	Concert Paraphrase on Powder Her Face	for two pianos	
Piano	2015	Blanca Variations	for piano	
Concertante	2016	Lieux retrouvés	for cello and small orchestra	
Opera	2016	The Exterminating Angel	for soloists, chorus and orchestra	after Luis Buñuel's 1962 film El ángel exterminador
Orchestral	2017	Luxury Suite from Powder Her Face	for orchestra	orchestral suite no. 2 from the opera Powder Her Face
Vocal	2017	By Beauteous Softness	for countertenor and piano	Purcell, realised by Thomas Adès for voice and piano
Vocal	2017	An Evening Hymn	for countertenor and piano	Purcell, realised by Thomas Adès for voice and piano
Vocal	2017	Four Songs	for countertenor and piano	Purcell, realised by Thomas Adès for voice and piano
Piano	2018	Souvenir	for piano	solo piano from the film “Colette”
Chamber	2018	Three Berceuses from The Exterminating Angel	for viola and piano	
Piano	2018	Berceuse from The Exterminating Angel	for piano	
Orchestral	2018	Hotel Suite from Powder Her Face	for orchestra	orchestral suite no. 3 from the opera Powder Her Face
Film Score	2018	Colette		
Concertante	2018	Piano Concerto	for piano and orchestra	
Orchestral	2018	Colette Suite	for chamber orchestra	a suite from the film “Colette” arrangement by Daniel Saleeb
Orchestral	2019	Inferno	for orchestra	ballet music
Orchestral	2019	O Albion	for string orchestra	from Arcadiana movement VI
Chamber	2020	Märchentänze	for violin and piano	
Orchestral	2020	Purgatorio	for orchestra and pre-recorded voices	ballet music
Orchestral	2020	Paradiso	for orchestra and female choir	ballet music
Ballet	2020	Dante	for orchestra with pre-recorded voices and female choir	I. Inferno II. Purgatorio III. Paradiso
Orchestral	2020	Dawn	for orchestra	Chacony for orchestra at any distance
Orchestral	2020	Shanty – Over the Sea	for string orchestra	
Vocal	2020	Gyökér (Root)	for soprano and four percussionists	
Orchestral	2020	The Exterminating Angel Symphony	for orchestra	four-movement orchestral rendering of music from the opera
Concertante	2021	Märchentänze	for violin and orchestra	
Chamber	2021	Four Berceuses from The Exterminating Angel	for clarinet, viola and piano	
Chamber	2021	Alchymia	for Basset clarinet or clarinet in A, 2 violins, viola and cello	
Chamber	2021	Tower	fanfare for 14 trumpets	
Vocal	2022	Növények	for mezzo-soprano and piano sextet	
Piano	2022	Az ág (The Branch)	for piano	
Orchestral	2022	Five Spells from The Tempest	for orchestra	based on music from the opera. Renamed from The Tempest Symphony
Chamber	2022	Suite from The Tempest	for violin and piano	based on music from the opera
Concertante	2022	Air – Homage to Sibelius	for violin and orchestra	
Guitar	2023	Forgotten Dances	for guitar	six movements: Overture, Berceuse, Courante, Barcarolle, Carillon de Ville and Vesper.
Chamber	2024	Wreath	for string quintet	
Orchestral	2024	Aquifer	for orchestra	
