= Epiphanias =

Poem by Goethe about Christmas

"Epiphanias" (German title: "Epiphaniasfest") is a Christmas-themed poem by Johann Wolfgang von Goethe (1749–1832). The title is the German word for the Christian feast of Epiphany.

"Epiphanias" may also refer to various pieces of music to which the poem is set, including by Hugo Wolf.
