= Simon Lepper =

British pianist

- Born: Canterbury, England
- Genres: Song accompaniment, chamber music
- Occupation: Pianist
- Instrument: Piano
- Website: www.simonlepper.com

Simon Lepper is a British pianist specialising in song accompaniment and chamber music

== Biography ==
Born in Canterbury, Lepper read music at King's College, Cambridge, and studied piano accompaniment with Michael Dussek at the Royal Academy of Music.

Whilst a student, he won many awards for piano accompaniment including the Gerald Moore Award as well as the accompanist prizes in the Kathleen Ferrier and Royal Overseas League competitions. He is an Associate of the Royal Academy of Music and is professor of Collaborative Piano at the Royal College of Music, London. He is the official accompanist for the Cardiff BBC Cardiff Singer of the World Song Prize. Some of the singers he has enjoyed recital partnerships with included Dame Felicity Palmer, Stéphane Degout, Sally Matthews, Karen Cargill, Angelika Kirchschlager, Mark Padmore, Christopher Purves, Nicky Spence, Christiane Karg, Ilker Arcayürek, Benjamin Appl, Soraya Mafi, Stephan Loges, Nicole Cabell, Gillian Keith. He also works with German violinist Carolin Widmann. Their recording of Xenakis, Feldman, Schoenberg and Zimmermann for ECM records received a Diapason d'or.

== Discography ==
''Debussy: Early Songs'' (with Gillian Keith)

- Released: 2003
- Format: CD
- Label: Deux-Elles

''A Garland for Presteigne'' (with Gillian Keith)

- Released: 12 April 2005
- Format: CD
- Label: Metronome

''Light and Water'' (music of Rhian Samuel; with Lucy Crowe, Joana Seara, Gemma Rosefield and others)

- Label: Deux-Elles

''Phantasy of Spring'' (with Carolin Widmann)

- Released: 25 September 2009
- Format: CD
- Label: ECM

''The Songs of Ronald Corp'' (with Mark Stone)

- Released: 15 November 2010
- Format: CD
- Label: Stone Records

''Schubert: Der Einsame'' (with İlker Arcayürek)

- Released: 1 September 2017
- Format: CD
- Label: Champs Hill Records
