= Italian Serenade (Wolf) =

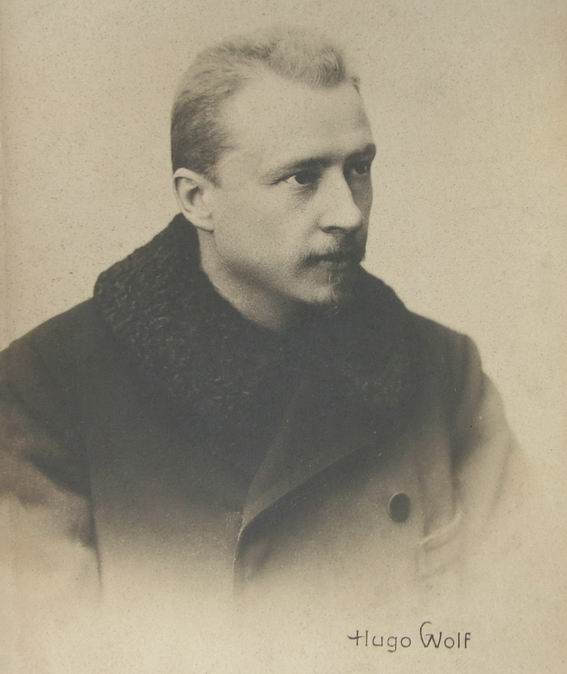
Hugo Wolf, 1885

The Italian Serenade is a piece of music written by Hugo Wolf in 1887. It was originally written for string quartet and named simply "Serenade in G major". By April 1890, he was referring to it in his letters as Italian Serenade. In 1892, he arranged it for string orchestra with an important solo viola part. It is one of his few works other than Lieder.

== History ==
The work was written between 2 and 4 May 1887. One of its inspirations was his concurrent work on setting various poems by Joseph Eichendorff to music, and the first of them "Der Soldat I" has a theme that is similar to that of the Serenade. That poem's subject is similar to that of Eichendorff's novella Memoirs of a Good-for-Nothing, and it may be that Wolf was as much influenced by this work as he was by the poem. The novella includes a section about an Italian serenade played by a small orchestra. The hero of the novella is a young violinist who leaves home to seek his fortune further afield, and this could well have been something that Wolf could relate to.

It was originally planned as part of a work in three movements. However, Wolf later abandoned this plan in favor of a self-contained, one-movement work. His father died only a week after he wrote the Italian Serenade, and he wrote no more music for the remainder of 1887.

When Wolf orchestrated the work in 1892, he was intending it as the first movement of a four-movement suite. He did sketch a slow movement in G minor, but never finished it. In his letters, he mentions another movement that he claimed to have completed, but that score has never come to light, only 45 measures of sketches being extant. In 1897, he sketched a few pages of a Tarantella to complete the suite, but he was committed to an insane asylum before he could finish it. In summary, all that remains of the projected suite is the Italian Serenade. Throughout his time in the asylum, where he remained for the rest of his life, he planned to complete the suite, but this never eventuated. Wolf died in February 1903.

The quartet version was first performed in May 1890 in Mannheim. The orchestra version was first played in Graz on January 29, 1904, eleven months after Wolf's death, by local orchestra conducted by Richard Wickenhauser.

== Structure ==
The Italian Serenade is quite short, taking only about 7 minutes, and has a lilting and varied theme, played over a pizzicato figure. The main theme is said to have been based on an old Italian melody played on an obsolete form of oboe called the piffero. Its lively and optimistic manner is an evocation of the Italianate spirit, realised through melodic richness. Robert W. Gutman has written that "The essence of the delicious Italian Serenade is its antithesis of romantic sentiment and mocking wit".

== Legacy ==
The Italian Serenade has been recorded many times; it is a favourite encore piece for string quartets, and it has been arranged by other hands for combinations of instruments such as a wind quintet.
