= Oxford International Song Festival =

UK-based classical music festival

Oxford Lieder Ltd
- Company type: Company limited by guarantee, registered charity
- Industry: Music & entertainment
- Founded: 2002
- Headquarters: Oxford, England
- Key people: Sholto Kynoch: Founder-director
- Website: oxfordsong.org

The Oxford International Song Festival (formerly the Oxford Lieder Festival prior to 2023) is a UK-based classical music festival, specialising in the art-song repertoire.

== History ==
The Festival was founded in 2002 by the pianist Sholto Kynoch, and in a short space of time grew to be the United Kingdom's largest art song festival. Oxford Lieder is now a registered charity and in addition to the annual festival which takes place in October, there are regular concerts and masterclasses throughout the year, and a growing programme of educational events. While most events are held in a core set of venues (including Holywell Music Room and the Jacqueline du Pré Music Building), there has been a recent show of concerts outside of central Oxford, England.

== Recordings ==
In 2010, Oxford Lieder made its first recording with Stone Records under the Oxford Lieder Live banner. The disc, released in 2011, was the first in a series that will comprise the first complete recordings of the songs of Hugo Wolf. Seven of a total of eleven discs have now been released. In 2013, Oxford Lieder & Stone Records released a live recording of the complete Canticles of Benjamin Britten and a CD entitled 'Schubert Lieder Year by Year', featuring one song from each year of Schubert's compositional life.

Since 2014, the festival has broadcast filmed performances online. Jeremy Hamway-Bidgood's 2014 film, 'Franz Schubert: Erlkönig' featuring music performed by Daniel Norman (Tenor) and Sholto Kynoch (Piano). During the 2020 festival, British-Iranian soprano Soraya Mafi performed a setting of Rumi's poem "Heart Snatcher" by Iranian composer Mahdis Kashani.

Since 2023, the Oxford Lieder Festival has been renamed to Oxford International Song Festival.

== Other activities ==
Oxford Lieder runs a Young Artist Platform, promoting young singer-pianist duos to music clubs and societies around England, Wales and Scotland. It is part of the Oxford Music Network, and works with local schools during the annual festival.

== Performers ==
Performers who have participated in the festival include:

	Name
Soprano	Soraya Mafi, Mary Bevan, Sarah-Jane Brandon, Sophie Daneman, Geraldine McGreevy, Kate Royal
Mezzo-soprano	Sarah Connolly, Anna Grevelius, Kitty Whately
Tenor	Nicky Spence, James Gilchrist, Daniel Norman, Mark Padmore, Ian Partridge, Robin Tischler
Baritone	Thomas Allen, Olaf Bär, William Dazeley, Gerald Finley, Thomas Guthrie, Wolfgang Holzmair, Jonathan Lemalu, Stephan Loges, Christopher Maltman, Roderick Williams, Nicky Spence, Mark Stone, Håkan Vramsmo
Pianist	Eugene Asti, Iain Burnside, Julius Drake, Michael Dussek, Iain Farrington, Graham Johnson, Sholto Kynoch, Natasha Loges, Malcolm Martineau, Paul Plummer, Sholto Kynoch
Harpsichordist	Julian Perkins
Narrator	Simon Callow
