= Tevot =

Musical work composed by Thomas Adès

Tevot is a one-movement symphony for orchestra by the British composer Thomas Adès. The work was commissioned by the Berlin Philharmonic and Carnegie Hall. The world premiere was given by the Berlin Philharmonic under the direction of Simon Rattle at the Berliner Philharmonie on February 21, 2007. The United States premiere was given by the same ensemble at Carnegie Hall on November 14, 2007.

== Composition ==
Tevot has is composed in one continuous movement and has a duration of roughly 22 minutes.

=== Background ===
The title of the piece comes from the Hebrew word for "bars of music." In the score program note, Adès added, "Also, in the Bible, (tey-VA) is the ark of Noah, and the cradle in which the baby Moses is carried on the river." The composer further described the meaning in an interview with Tom Service of The Guardian, remarking, "I liked the idea that the bars of the music were carrying the notes as a sort of family through the piece. And they do, because without bars, you'd have musical chaos. But I was thinking about the ark, the vessel, in the piece as the earth. The earth would be a spaceship, a ship that carries us – and several other species! – through the chaos of space in safety. It sounds a bit colossal, but it's the idea of the ship of the world." He continued, "I thought of the piece as one huge journey, but in order to make that journey truthful, to give it movement, there had to be many quite sudden and instant changes of landscape."

Adès also recalled a sense of urgency writing the piece, saying, "I couldn't sleep at night. I would feel that I would absolutely die if I didn't succeed in bringing the piece to harbour. It would have been a frightening feeling not to do that. It's more than a need – it feels essential. It's like transporting a person through the air, and you have to make sure they land in one piece."

=== Instrumentation ===
The work is scored for an unusually large orchestra comprising five flutes (3rd, 4th, & 5th doubling piccolos; 3rd doubling bass flute), five oboes (4th doubling English horn; 5th doubling bass oboe), five clarinets (2nd doubling E♭ clarinet; 4th doubling E♭ & A clarinets, plus optional basset clarinet; 5th doubling contrabass clarinet), four bassoons, contrabassoon, eight horns, five trumpets, three trombones, two tubas, 2 timpani players, six percussionists, harp, piano (doubling celesta), and strings.

== Reception ==
Tevot has been praised by music critics. Tom Service wrote, "Of any piece of new music I've heard at its premiere, this is one of the most immediately, richly powerful." Reviewing the United States premiere, Anthony Tommasini of The New York Times opined, "In this arresting performance Tevot announced itself as an instantly essential new work." Tommasini further wrote:

It begins with eerily skittish high figurations in the strings that sound at once ominous and angelic. Moaning swells emerge from the lower orchestra, and the music builds in intensity and complexity until, in an attempt to break free, a volley of 12-tone-like riffs wildly erupts, clearing away the angst. The piece segues into its most rhythmically agitated and harmonically gnashing episode. Then a passage of consoling music with sighing lyrical fragments begins, and you are sure the calming coda to the piece has arrived. Not so. Mr. Adès prolongs this episode for roughly half of the work's nearly 25-minute length. He keeps coming up with new variants of layered harmony, instrumental sonorities and supple rhythmic figures that keep you hooked.

Richard Whitehouse of Gramophone called Tevot "an eventful 22 minutes" and wrote, "From a shimmering opening that erupts in energetic exchanges, it builds a momentum underpinned by the antagonism between tuned anvils and an oboe-led chorale. Reaching an expressive plateau, the piece recalls its start via a descent that gives the stratospheric violin-writing a definite harmonic context, before the climactic final section attempts more overt tonal closure." Mark Swed of the Los Angeles Times observed, "Like America, this journey begins with another weird swirl – this one, though, more music of the spheres. After a section of vigorous, brash dance music, Tevot settles down into long, calming, Mahlerian peace seeking, awed slow music of haunting beauty." He added, "Ades doesn't hold back in his music. When it's raw, it's raw. When it's cooked, it gets four stars."

Conversely, Ivan Hewett of The Daily Telegraph was critical of the work, writing, "I was staggered and appalled at the piece's unstoppable energy, as pitiless as a lava flow, and waited for the high, still chorale on violins at the piece's core, hoping this time I would be moved by it. But it seemed ice-cold as ever, and the grandeur of the ending a mite Hollywood-ish. This is a piece that's either hot or cold, but never warm."

== Recording ==
A recording of Tevot performed by Rattle and the Berlin Philharmonic was released through EMI Classics on March 23, 2010. The disk also features Adès's Violin Concerto, among other of the composer's works.

== See also ==
- List of compositions by Thomas Adès
