= Asyla =

1997 orchestral composition by Thomas Adès

- by Thomas Adès
- Opus: 17
- Period: Contemporary classical music
- Genre: Orchestral music
- Composed: 1997
- Publisher: Faber Music
- Duration: 22–25 minutes
- Movements: 4
- Scoring: Large orchestra

Premiere
- Date: 1 October 1997
- Location: Symphony Hall, Birmingham
- Conductor: Simon Rattle
- Performers: City of Birmingham Symphony Orchestra

Asyla, Op. 17, is an orchestral composition by the British composer Thomas Adès. It was finished in 1997 and has been performed widely, especially by the British conductor Simon Rattle. It has been described as a symphony, the third movement being its unacknowledged scherzo.

== Composition ==
The title of the composition is the Latin plural form of asylum, which here means both sanctuary and madhouse. It was commissioned by the John Feeney Charitable Trust and was premiered by the City of Birmingham Symphony Orchestra under the baton of Simon Rattle, in Birmingham's Symphony Hall in October 1997.

This piece is best known for its third movement, which features techno-like traits. Adès himself narrated the compositional process as follows:

So I bought some techno music and listened to it, just quietly, to get the structure rather than blast my head off. I realised that, in techno, you have to repeat things 32 or 64 times. So I tried to orchestrate it one night in my living room, repeating all these figures over and over, on this massive score paper, 30 staves to a page. At 3am, I went to bed and, as I sat there, realised my heart had stopped beating. I thought, 'Christ, I'm having a heart attack'. I rang the hospital and then they sent an ambulance. My heart gradually started again, but very shallowly. The ambulance took me to the Royal Free, where I waited for two hours among other Saturday night casualties. And finally a doctor saw me and said, 'You hyperventilated'. I thought, 'Thank God. It's not my heart, it's just my brain...

— Thomas Adès, The Independent, 27 May 1999

Asyla received critical praise and won a Royal Philharmonic Society Music Award in 1997 and the Grawemeyer Award for Music Composition in 2000. It was eventually published by Faber Music in 2000.

== Analysis ==
This composition has four movements and takes 22 to 25 minutes to perform. The movement list is as follows:

1. [untitled]
2. [untitled]
3. Ecstasio
4. [untitled]

It is scored for a very large orchestra, which resembles Charles Ives' 4th symphony. In addition to the standard instrumentation, also includes 3 pianos (a grand piano and 2 upright pianos, one tuned a quarter tone lower, doubling celesta and grand piano four-hands), six percussionists playing a large range of instruments, and woodwinds doubling bass oboe, bass flute and contrabass clarinet in addition to the standard auxiliaries.

Percussion instruments include 5 or 6 timpani, 3 or 4 roto toms, 5 tuned hand drums, 2 bell plates, over 2 octaves of tuned cowbells, 4 tubular bells, chinese cymbal, 2 hi hats, 3 tins, ocean drum (geophone), water gong, 2 ratchets, washboard, 11 tuned gongs, 4 suspended cymbals of various sizes, splash cymbal, 2 snare drums, sandpaper blocks, a bag of knives or forks, glockenspiel, clash cymbals, 2 orchestral bass drums and a kit bass drum, and 2 octaves of crotales.

The piece starts with an untitled movement with cowbells and the flat piano, which is immediately followed by the horns and the high-pitched sound of the strings. The general atmosphere of the movement becomes much more agitated when the rest of the orchestra joins in progressively. The second movement begins abruptly and suddenly changes to a soft melody played by the bass oboe. Then the strings take over with a style which has been classified by some critics as "Wagnerian". The sound starts to dissipate towards the end of the movement, fading out using the highest and lowest registers simultaneously.

The third movement tries to resemble "the atmosphere of a massive nightclub with people dancing and taking drugs". It has a steady rhythm which has been compared to Stravinsky's The Rite of Spring. The music here is much more insistent than in the previous movements and is much more vivid and lively. After reaching a climax echoed by the strings, the fourth movement becomes calmer at the beginning, and suddenly turns violent when a tutti chord initiated by the horns bursts towards the end of the piece. Asyla ends in a quiet but trembling manner.

== In popular culture ==
The third movement is featured in season 4 episode 10 of the Amazon Prime series Mozart in the Jungle.

== See also ==
- List of compositions by Thomas Adès
