= Manuel Venegas =

1897 unfinished opera by Hugo Wolf

Manuel Venegas is an 1897 unfinished opera by Hugo Wolf to libretto by Moritz Hoernes after Pedro Antonio de Alarcón's El niño de la bola (Christ Child with globus cruciger). Only the first act was completed. 34 minutes of the work were recorded on the Capriccio label in 1991 on the album Wolf: Vocal Works and re-issued in 2004 on Hugo Wolf: Orchesterlieder.

== Cast ==
- Carlos, a retired captain, baritone – Oliver Widmer
- Don Trinidad, the priest, bass – Cornelius Hauptmann
- Manuel Venegas, tenor – Josef Protschka
- Morisco, a mule driver, tenor – Kor-Jan Dusseljee
- Soledad Arregui, mezzo-soprano – Mitsuko Shirai
- Vitriolo, the pharmacist, tenor – Christoph Späth
- Württemberg Chamber Choir, Dieter Kurz
