= Dartington International Summer School =

Summer school and music festival in England

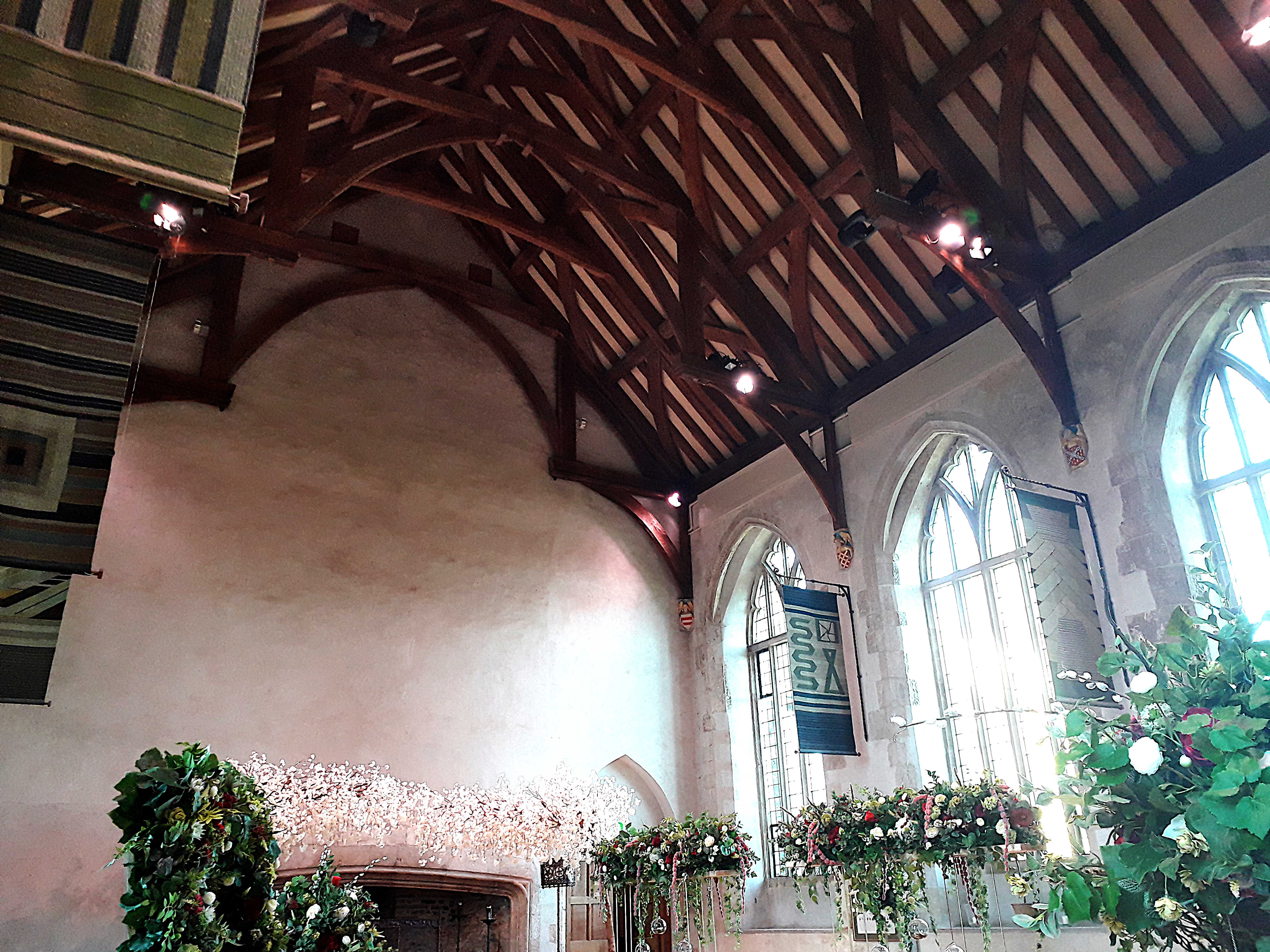
Dartington - the Great Hall's hammerbeam roof

Dartington International Summer School was a British summer school and festival of music held on the medieval estate of Dartington Hall, Devon, England, and the first summer school of music in the United Kingdom. It was a department of the Dartington Trust. It was replaced in 2024 by ChoralFest, a new venture for the Trust, which invites singers to work on a large-scale choral work with celebrated international tutors and pianists.

== Operation ==
First established at Bryanston School in 1948 (largely through the work of William Glock), the summer school moved to Dartington in 1953. It was pitched at people who wanted to enjoy music, both professional (such as conservatoire students) and amateur. Internationally renowned musicians were invited to teach and direct the courses and to perform concerts in the evenings, with some courses working towards student performances at the end of a week.

The list of artists who taught or performed at the summer school at Dartington includes some of the most recognisable names in classical music and beyond: Arthur Rubinstein, Igor Stravinsky, Imogen Holst, Benjamin Britten, Peter Maxwell Davies, Ravi Shankar, Alfred Brendel, Simon Callow, Joanna MacGregor, Harrison Birtwistle, Martin Carthy, Dame Emma Kirkby, and many more.

The school was made up of multiple weeks catering to different musical genres or periods, earlier weeks catering to older music (Renaissance and Baroque) and later weeks moving through the Classical period to Contemporary and Jazz; students could sign up for one or more weeks. Although the school was predominantly about classical music (from early through to contemporary), other genres such as digital, world, jazz and folk were also covered. The summer school had a resident orchestra - the Dartington Festival Orchestra - who accompanied choral music and worked with trainee conductors.

Artists and most participants were resident in accommodation on the Dartington Estate, with concerts taking place mainly in the old medieval banqueting hall (known as the Great Hall), and classes being taught around the medieval courtyard and in the studio buildings that used to be part of Dartington College of Arts.

== New format ==
In November 2023, the festival's website said plans for the 2024 festival were being reviewed by a new executive management team, alongside all Dartington Hall Trust's core activities, and that more information would be forthcoming in due course.

In January 2024, Mark Stone was announced as Creative Director of Dartington Hall Trust and organiser of the Dartington International Summer School. In the same month, ChoralFest 2024, led by conductor Gavin Carr, was announced as the 76th summer school at Dartington, replacing the previous multi-week programme of courses and events. Dartington Trust had earlier clarified that a music summer school planned for 2024 in Norfolk, and run by certain individuals previously connected with Dartington, was not a relocated Dartington Trust activity and an entirely separate event.
