= DE =

DE, de, or dE may refer to:

== Human names ==
- De (surname), a Bengali family name
- Dé (footballer, 1940–1992), Ademar José Ribeiro, Brazilian football left-back
- Dé (footballer, born 1998), Cledson Carvalho da Silva, Brazilian football forward
- de, a nobiliary particle

== Language and linguistics ==
- De (Cyrillic) (Д, д), a letter in the Cyrillic script
- German language (ISO 639-1 alpha-2 code)
- De (kana) (で, デ), a Japanese hiragana/katakana
- de (interjection), Albanian interjection
- de-, an English prefix denoting reversal, undoing, removing; intensifying; or from, off
- Downward entailing, in linguistic semantics, a property of a modifier that reduces the number or degree an expression

== Media and business ==
- Condor (airline) (IATA code), a German airline
- Daily Express, a British tabloid newspaper
- Digital Extremes, a Canadian-operated computer and video game development studio
- Douwe Egberts, a coffee brand
- John Deere (NYSE stock ticker symbol), an American machinery manufacturer

== Military ==
- Defence Estates, an agency of the UK Ministry of Defence
- Desert Eagle, a large-caliber semi-automatic pistol manufactured by Magnum Research
- Destroyer escort (US Navy hull classification symbol)

== Places ==
- Dé, Mali, a commune and town in Mali
- De River, Mizoram, India
- Delaware, US state, abbreviated "DE" by the US Postal Service and others
- DE postcode area, for Derby and surrounding areas of England
- Germany (ISO 3166-1 alpha-2 country code)
  - .de, the ccTLD for Germany
- Maluku (province), Indonesia (vehicle registration prefix DE)

== Science, technology, and mathematics ==
- Design engineer, engineer whose specialty is design
- Desktop environment, a graphical user interface commonly based on a desktop metaphor
- Dextrose equivalent, the relative sweetness of sugars
- Diatomaceous earth, a naturally occurring, soft, siliceous sedimentary rock mineral
- Differential equation, an equation which derivatives of a function appear as variables
- Differential evolution, a method of mathematical optimization
- Doctor of Engineering, a degree equivalent to a Ph.D. in engineering
- Dwarf elliptical galaxy (dE), in astronomy
- Dynamics Explorer, a NASA satellite mission
- Haplogroup DE (Y-DNA), a human Y-chromosome DNA haplogroup in genetics
- ΔE (color space) (dE), a mathematical measurement of the distance between two points in a Lab color space

== Other uses ==
- De (Chinese philosophy), a concept of integrity in Daoism and virtue in Confucianism
- Defensive end, a position in American and Canadian football
- Distance education, studying through a correspondence course
- De, a scale degree in tonic sol-fa (sharpened form of doh)

== See also ==
- Department of Education, a common government department
