= Totentanz (Adès) =

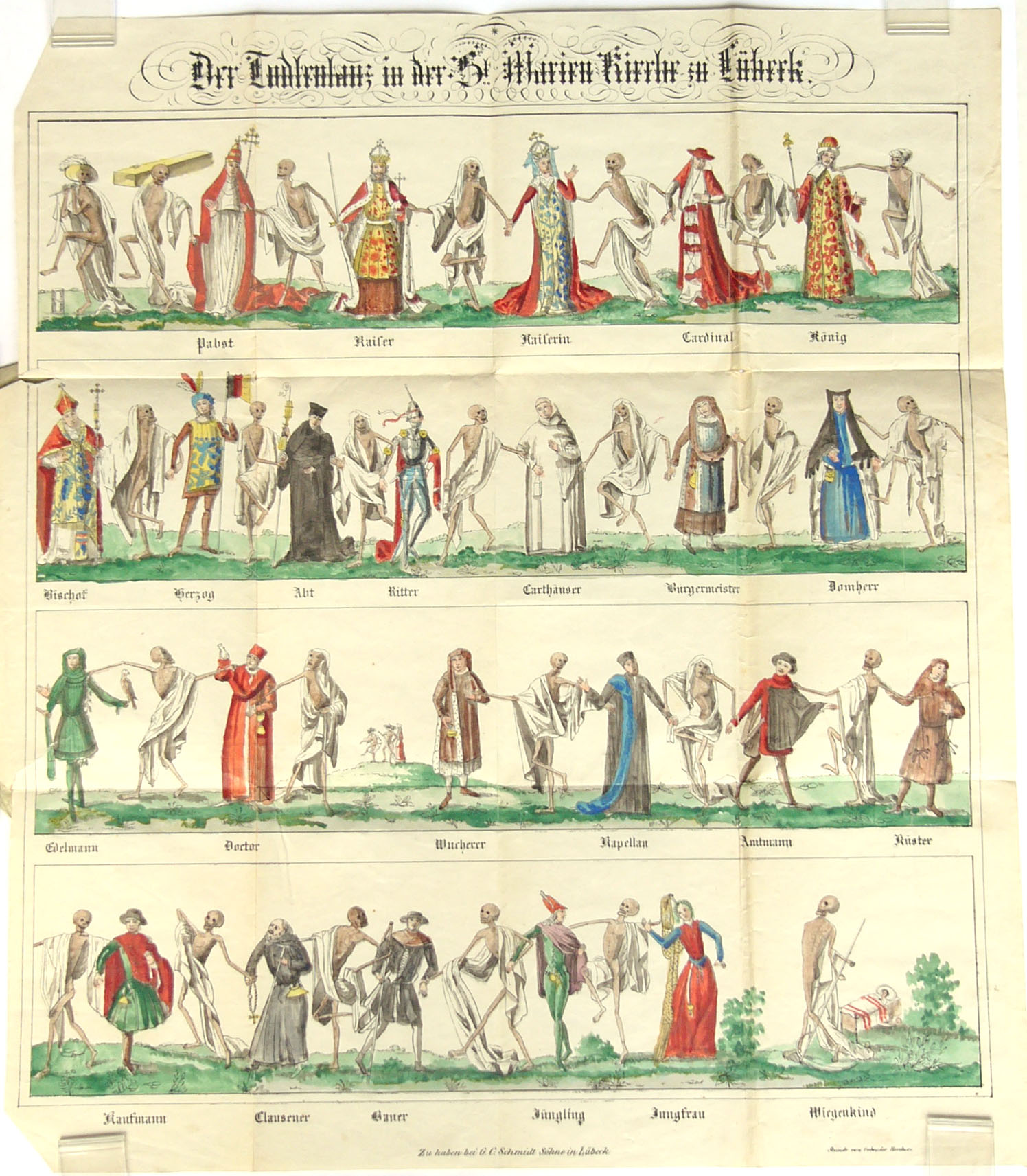
A detailed description and illustration of the Totentanz in St. Mary's Church, Lübeck, based on the copy made in 1701 by Anton Wortmann.

Totentanz is a composition for baritone, mezzo-soprano, and orchestra by the British composer Thomas Adès. The work was commissioned by Robin Boyle in memory of the composer Witold Lutosławski and of his wife Danuta. Its world premiere was given in the Royal Albert Hall during The Proms on July 17, 2013 and was performed by the baritone Simon Keenlyside, the mezzo-soprano Christianne Stotijn, and the BBC Symphony Orchestra under the direction of Adès.

== Composition ==
Totentanz is cast in one continuous movement and has a duration of roughly 40 minutes.

Totentanz is set to an anonymously authored text that appeared under a 15th-century frieze in St. Mary's Church, Lübeck, that was destroyed by a British air raid in World War II. In the score program notes, Adès wrote, "the frieze depicted members of every category of human society in strictly descending order of status, from the Pope to a baby. In-between each human figure is an image of Death, dancing and inviting the humans to join him. In this setting, each of the humans in turn is represented by a low soprano, and Death by a baritone."

=== Instrumentation ===
The work is scored for baritone, mezzo-soprano, and a large orchestra consisting of the following instruments.

Woodwinds
3 flutes (1st and 2nd doubling piccolo; 3rd doubling piccolo and alto flute)
3 oboes (3rd doubling cor anglais)
3 clarinets (1st in B♭ and A, doubling E♭ clarinet; 2nd in A, doubling bass clarinet; 3rd in A, doubling bass clarinet with low C)
3 bassoons (2nd doubling contrabassoon; 3rd doubling contraforte or contrabassoon with low A)

Brass
4 horns
3 trumpets (all doubling flugelhorn)
2 trombones
1 bass trombone
1 contrabass tuba

Percussion
timpani (doubling rototoms)
6-8 percussionists

Keyboards

piano (doubling celesta)

Strings
harp
violins I, II
violas
celli
double basses

== Reception ==
Totentanz has been highly praised by music critics. Reviewing the world premiere, Ivan Hewett of The Daily Telegraph called it "an immense achievement" and compared it favorably to performances of Benjamin Britten's Sinfonia da Requiem and Witold Lutosławski's Cello Concerto, writing, "On their own these two performances would have lifted this Prom into a different class. Then came something that raised it higher still; the world premiere of Thomas Adès's Totentanz." Helen Wallace of BBC Music Magazine similarly opined, "It hurls us into a labyrinth the senior composer would recognise, but which is darker and more manically brutal than anything even he conceived." The piece was also praised by Andrew Clements of The Guardian, who wrote:

In Adès's piece the baritone is death's mouthpiece - declamatory, angular and rather Bergian (the opening of the work very much recalls the prologue to Lulu), with just a few moments of insidious quietness, while the mezzo, more lyrical, more vulnerable, represents the victims who vainly try to resist him. Throughout their exchanges the orchestral machine moves relentlessly on, constantly changing tack and inventing new sound-worlds but always keeping its power in reserve, and consuming everything it encounters. In the closing pages death and humanity seem to reach a truce in a passage of almost Straussian lyricism, Adès's most frankly expressive music to date, but it proves only temporary and the work ends in the lowest depths of the orchestra, having worked its way downwards.

Reviewing the United States premiere, Martin Bernheimer of the Financial Times remarked, "The 40-minute Totentanz [...] represents a clever dance of death predicated on harmonic, rhythmic and, occasionally, melodic complexity. The first half emerges essentially raucous, the second predominantly serene (everything, of course, is relative). Adès toys neatly with contrasting images of terror and resignation, manipulating a huge orchestral apparatus with virtuosic clarity amid percussive bombast." David Allen of The New York Times described the work as "a grisly symphony-cantata for two singers and a vast orchestra that is his longest, most ambitious and most astounding orchestral composition yet." He added, "Despite an imprecise performance here, it's clear that with Totentanz, this composer takes a dizzying leap beyond his finest earlier scores — Asyla (1997) and Tevot (2007) — and adds to a lineage of musical death-dances, including those of Liszt and Saint-Saëns."

However, George Grella of the New York Classical Review was slightly more critical of the piece. Despite describing it as Adés's "most fully realized large-scale score to date," Grella nevertheless observed, "Totentanz works musically, is fascinating and powerful throughout, though it's [sic] language still is at one remove from touching the listener intimately. The piece makes clear what Adés is thinking, but while we hear what is in his head, we don’t necessarily feel it."

== See also ==
- List of compositions by Thomas Adès
