= Jennifer Johnston (mezzo-soprano) =

English operatic singer

- Born: Liverpool, England
- Education: University of Cambridge; Royal College of Music
- Occupation: Operatic singer

Jennifer Johnston is an English operatic mezzo-soprano. Born in Liverpool, she studied law at the University of Cambridge and worked in London chambers as a barrister before studying opera at the Royal College of Music (RCM). She is universally known as the "Scouse Diva"..

== Career ==
A former BBC New Generation Artist, she made her professional debut as Humperdinck's Hänsel for Scottish Opera, followed by her international debuts at the Aix-en-Provence Festival as Dido in Purcell's Dido and Aeneas, and at the Salzburg Festival as Carmi in an unstaged performance of Mozart's La Betulia Liberata; a performance which was recorded and released on DVD by Deutsche Grammophon. She is particularly associated with the Bayerische Staatsoper and its distinguished musical director Kirill Petrenko, where her roles have included Second Norn, Roßweise, Floßhilde, Hedwige and La Ciesca. She has appeared in opera at the Teatro alla Scala as Mrs Grose in The Turn of the Screw (Britten) and Gaia in Giorgio Battistelli's CO_{2}, and additionally at the Salzburg Festival as Lady de Hautdesert in Gawain (Birtwistle), and as Leda in Die Liebe der Danae (Strauss).

A prolific concert performer, she has performed with many of the world's greatest orchestras and conductors, including as Jocaste in Stravinsky's Oedipus Rex (Sir John Eliot Gardiner/Berlin Philharmonic & London Symphony Orchestras, released as an LSO Live disc), Beethoven’s Missa Solemnis (Sir John Eliot Gardiner/Orchestre Revolutionnaire et Romantique at the BBC Proms and on disc), Mahler’s Second Symphony (De la Parra/London Philharmonic Orchestra), Mahler's Third Symphony (Welser-Möst/Cleveland Orchestra, Zinman/Orchestre National de Lyon), Elgar's Sea Pictures (Tate/Hamburg Symphony Orchestra), Elgar's The Dream of Gerontius (Brabbins/BBC Scottish Symphony Orchestra), Verdi's Requiem (Gardner/Bergen Philharmonic Orchestra, Slatkin/Orchestra National de Lyon), Schumann’s Das Paradies und die Peri (Gatti/Accademia Di Santa Cecilia), Adès's Totentanz (Adès/Royal Concertgebouw Orchestra, Harding/Swedish Radio Symphony Orchestra), and Pasqualita in Adams' Doctor Atomic (Adams/BBC Symphony Orchestra, recorded for Nonesuch).

She made her solo recital debut at the Wigmore Hall accompanied by Joseph Middleton and broadcast live on BBC Radio 3. She is a founder member of The Prince Consort, with whom she has recorded for Linn Records, and has appeared in recital at Wigmore Hall, the Concertgebouw and the Aldeburgh Festival. Her extensive discography includes Anthony Payne's arrangement of Vaughan Williams's Four Last Songs with the BBC Symphony Orchestra under Martyn Brabbins for Albion Records, which she premiered at the BBC Proms (Vänska/BBCSO) and which was nominated for a Grammy Award.

Johnston was the recipient of the Royal Philharmonic Society's 2021 Singer Award.

On 15 July 2022, she sang in Verdi's "Requiem" for the First Night of the Proms.
