= Traced Overhead =

Traced Overhead is a composition for piano by the British composer Thomas Adès. The work was commissioned by the pianist Imogen Cooper and the Cheltenham Music Festival with additional funding from Arts Council England. Its world premiere was given at the Cheltenham Music Festival on July 20, 1996 by Imogen Cooper. The piece is Adès's third composition for solo piano, following Darknesse Visible (1992) and Still Sorrowing (1993).

== Structure ==
Traced Overhead has a duration of roughly 12 minutes and is cast in three movements:

1. Sursum
2. Aetheria
3. Chori

== Reception ==
The piece has been praised by music critics. Anthony Tommasini of The New York Times wrote, "Traced Overhead (1995–96), Mr. Adès explained, was inspired partly by images from sacred paintings of angels ascending toward the heavens in shafts of light. In it he tries to evoke upward-swirling figurations and downward-cascading waterfalls simultaneously, and somehow pulls it off. The music quivers with spiraling riffs, piercing contrapuntal lines and pungent cluster chords that ecstatically leap about the keyboard." Michael Oliver of Gramophone similarly opined, "Traced Overhead is filled with mysterious, glancing references to remembered piano music, but is grippingly coherent."

== See also ==
- List of compositions by Thomas Adès
