= Opera Holland Park =

Opera company in London, England

Coordinates: 51°30′8.11″N 0°12′7.48″W

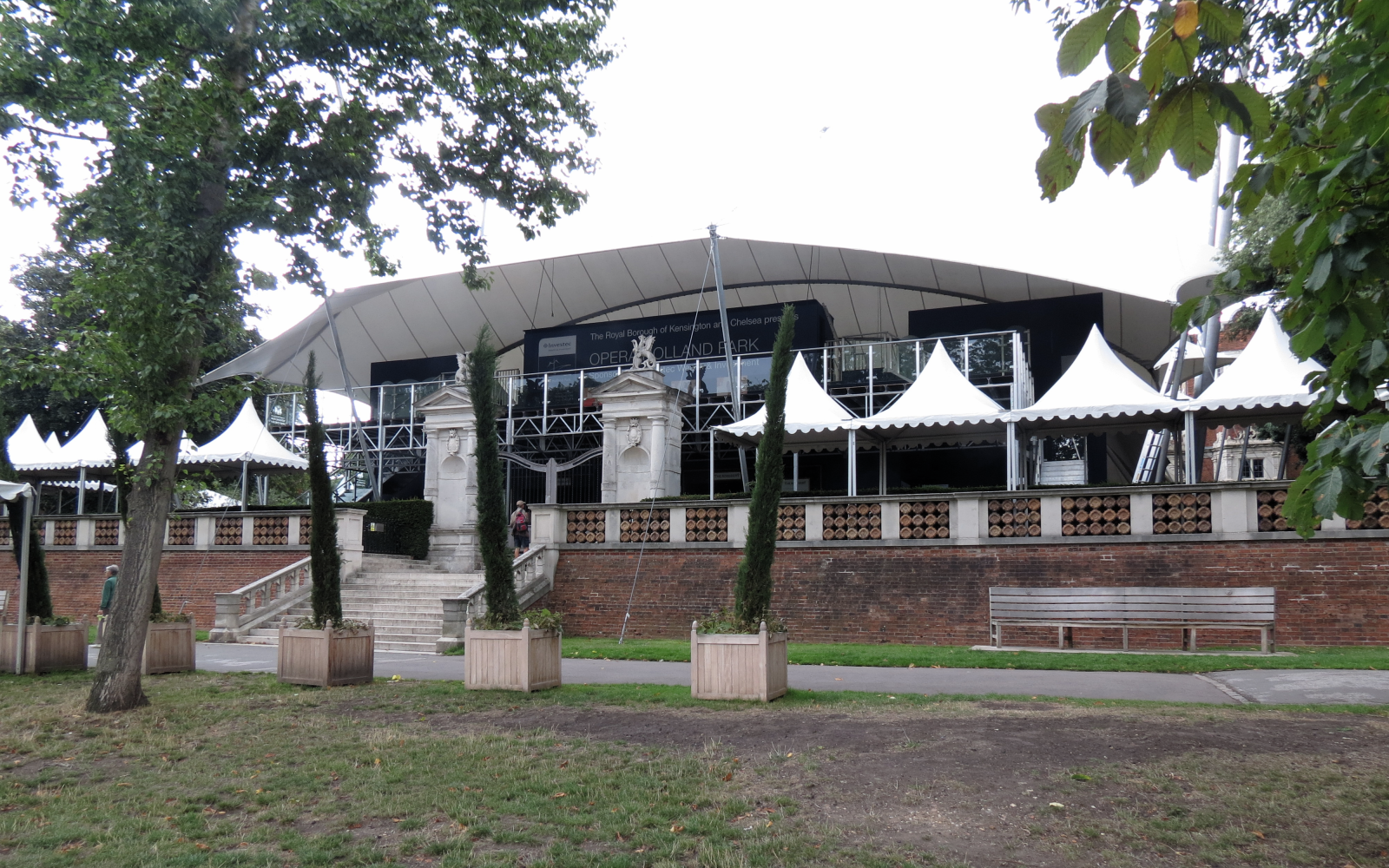
2013 stage

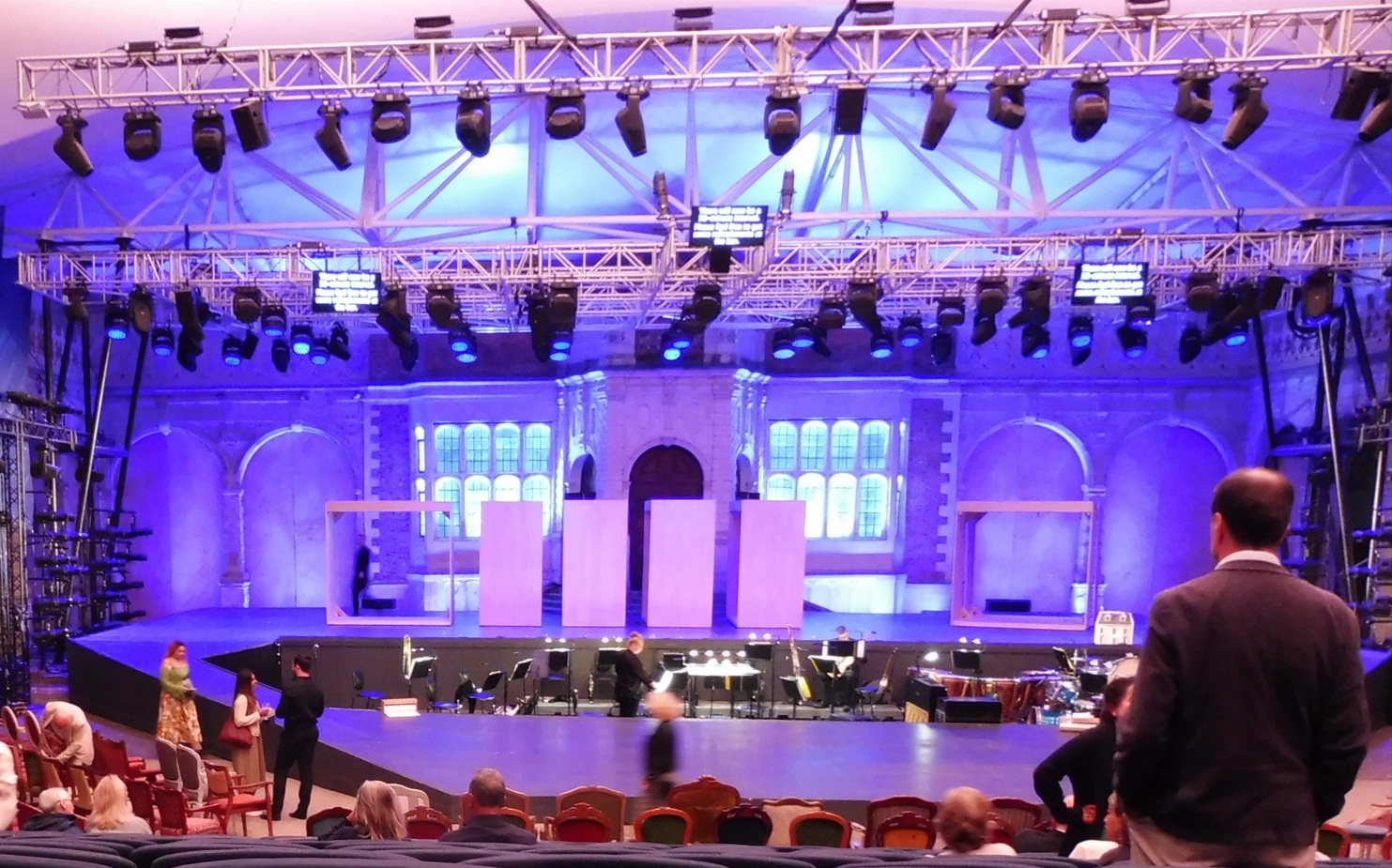
Auditorium of Opera Holland Park 2026

Opera Holland Park is a summer opera company which produces an annual season of opera performances, staged under a temporary canopy in front of the remains of Holland House, a Blitz-damaged building in Holland Park, west central London.

City of London Sinfonia has held the position of resident orchestra since 2003.

Opera Holland Park was named by Hugh Canning as best opera company in his 'best and worst in classical and opera 2010' in The Sunday Times.

The front of house space was used as a location in Woody Allen's 2010 film You Will Meet a Tall Dark Stranger.

== Theatre and canopy structure ==
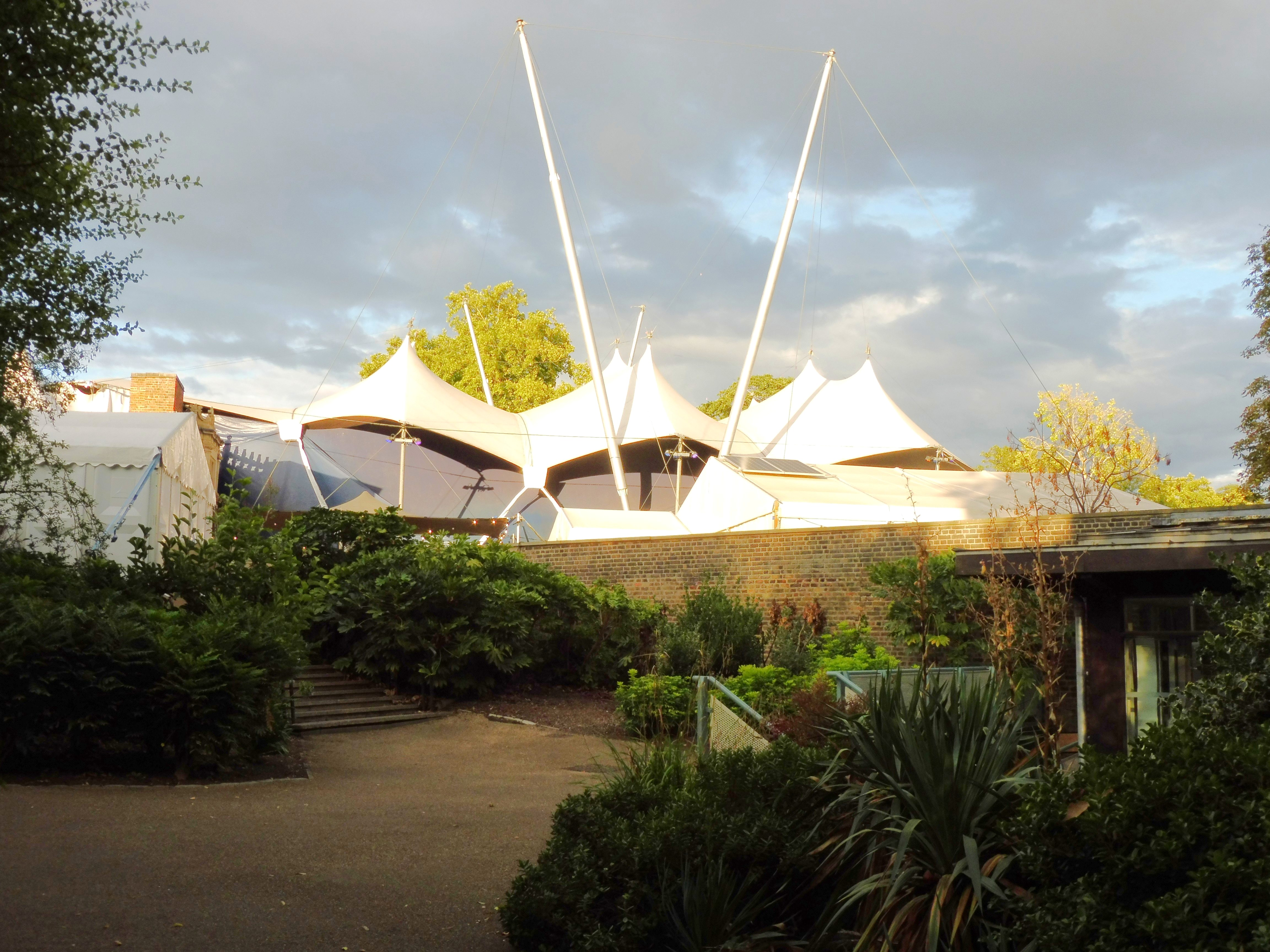
Canopy erected in front of Holland House for Opera Holland Park 2026

The current theatre canopy was designed in 2007 by Architen Landrell and Hall + Bednarczyk and covers an area of 1600 square metres. It is completely free standing and designed to be craned into position over three days, followed by a fit-out period of two weeks. The inside layout was redesigned to meet COVID-19 restrictions in 2021.

Opera Holland Park came into conflict with locals and the Friends of Holland Park in 2013 over plans to extend the canopy's erection period. Over 200 objections to any kind of canopy were received by the council and the organisation was ultimately unable to secure permission for an extension, but the season continued with its usual duration. Workmen erecting the canopy were subject to verbal abuse and anti-opera posters were put up around the park.

== Management and organization ==
Until October 2015, the company was a part of the Royal Borough of Kensington and Chelsea, with permanent staff technically council officers.

The company became an independent charity in October 2015, receiving a final grant settlement of £5 million from the council, more than ten times their previous annual subsidy. A new board was installed, chaired by Charles Mackay CBE, former chairman of Historic Royal Palaces.

== See also ==
List of opera festivals
