= Britten-Pears Orchestra =

The Britten-Pears Orchestra, formerly The Snape Maltings Training Orchestra, is the youth orchestra of the Britten-Pears Young Artists Programme at Snape Maltings, run by the Aldeburgh Festival.

Since the very first course in 1972, over 10,000 young artists have attended what started as the Britten–Pears School for Advanced Musical Studies, and is now called the Britten–Pears Young Artist Programme. The programme aims to bridge the gap between conservatoires and professional life, offering unique development and performance opportunities to young musicians. Many have gone on to become leading musicians in their own right. Masterclasses for singers, ensembles, instrumentalists and composers are held from March until October. There are also opportunities for emerging young professional musicians to work with leading conductors, soloists and orchestral principals in both the Britten–Pears Orchestra and the Britten–Pears Baroque Orchestra. Many of the masterclasses are open to the public, and each course culminates in a public performance, including at the Aldeburgh Festival and Snape Proms. Auditions are held across the world, now using modern technology to access countries on the other side of the globe. In 2012, the Britten–Pears Orchestra was conducted by Antonello Manacorda, performing Beethoven’s Ninth Symphony at Snape Maltings Concert Hall at Easter. Previous conductors of the BPO include Edward Gardner, Oliver Knussen, Kirill Karabits, Vasily Petrenko and Robin Ticciati. The Britten–Pears Baroque Orchestra, formed in 1992, is formed each year to work on baroque repertoire, and previous tutors have included period specialists Richard Egarr, Emmanuelle Haïm, Laurence Cummings, Andreas Scholl and Harry Bicket. They presented Rameau’s Naïs as part of the 2012 Snape Proms under Christophe Rousset. In 2012, as part of the Cultural Olympiad, the Aldeburgh World Orchestra was formed, conducted by Sir Mark Elder. Young musicians from across the globe submitted their auditions on YouTube, and an international ensemble of around 124 young musicians came to Suffolk to train and perform both in the Concert Hall in Snape and as part of the BBC Promenade Concert season at the Royal Albert Hall, as well as on a short European tour.

In 2012, Aldeburgh Strings was created to perform under the baton of Markus Däurnet at the 2012 Britten Weekend, when the programme included Britten’s Prelude and Fugue, Lachrymae and In memoriam Dennis Brain.
