= Sholto Kynoch =

English pianist

Sholto Kynoch is an English pianist who specializes in song and chamber music.

== Biography ==
Born in London in 1979, Kynoch attended Ampleforth College before reading music at Worcester College, Oxford, where he was organ scholar. He studied piano accompaniment at the Royal Academy of Music and the Guildhall School of Music and Drama; his teachers have included Michael Dussek, Graham Johnson, Malcolm Martineau, Ronan O'Hora and Vanessa Latarche.

He is the founder and artistic director of the Oxford International Song Festival, and is the pianist of the Phoenix Piano Trio.

== Personal life ==
Kynoch is married to author Kate Wakeling, and they have two sons.

== Discography ==
- Hugo Wolf - the complete songs - volume 5: Heine, Reinick, Shakespeare & Byron (with Sarah-Jane Brandon - soprano, Daniel Norman - tenor & William Dazeley - baritone), Stone Records 2013
- Beethoven piano trios (with Phoenix Piano Trio), Stone Records 2012
- Hugo Wolf - the complete songs - volume 4: Keller, Fallersleben, Ibsen & other poets (with Mary Bevan - soprano, & Quirijn de Lang - baritone), Stone Records 2012
- Hugo Wolf - the complete songs - volume 3: Italienisches Liederbuch (with Geraldine McGreevy - soprano, & Mark Stone - baritone), Stone Records 2012
- Hugo Wolf - the complete songs - volume 2: Mörike Lieder part 2 (with Sophie Daneman - soprano, Anna Grevelius - mezzo-soprano, James Gilchrist - tenor, & Stephan Loges - baritone), Stone Records 2011
- Hugo Wolf - the complete songs - volume 1: Mörike Lieder part 1 (with Sophie Daneman - soprano, Anna Grevelius - mezzo-soprano, James Gilchrist - tenor, & Stephan Loges - baritone), Stone Records 2011
- Fantasy (with Kaoru Yamada - violin), Stone Records 2010
