= America: A Prophecy =

America: A Prophecy (sometimes stylized as America (A Prophecy)) is a composition for mezzo-soprano and orchestra with an optional chorus by the British composer Thomas Adès. The work was commissioned by the New York Philharmonic with financial contributions from the Francis Goelet Fund. It was given its world premiere by the mezzo-soprano Beth Clayton, the Westminster Symphonic Choir, and the New York Philharmonic under the direction of Kurt Masur at Avery Fisher Hall on November 11, 1999.

== Composition ==
=== Background ===
America: A Prophecy was commissioned by Masur and the New York Philharmonic for a program of all new music commemorating the new millennium titled "Messages for the Millennium." Though he was originally asked to compose a hopeful piece, Adès instead chose to write an apocalyptic work. Masur was reportedly stunned by the piece and subsequently revised the intent of his original program, splitting it into two separate programs entirely.

=== Structure ===
America: A Prophecy has a duration of roughly 15 minutes and is composed in two movements.

1. Part 1
2. Part 2

The first movement is set to ancient Mayan poetry from the books of Chilam Balam. The second movement is set to the poem "La Guerra" by Matteo Flexa.

=== Instrumentation ===
The work is scored for a mezzo-soprano, an optional SATB chorus, and a large orchestra comprising four flutes (3rd and 4th doubling piccolo), four oboes, two clarinets, bass clarinet, contrabass clarinet, four bassoons (4th doubling contrabassoon), four horns, three trumpets (1st doubling piccolo trumpet), two trombones, bass trombone, tuba, timpani, four percussionists, piano, harp, and strings.

== Reception ==
America: A Prophecy has been praised by music critics. Reviewing the world premiere program "Messages for the Millennium," James R. Oestreich of The New York Times called it "the strongest work here, roiling and disturbing, perhaps the project's prime asset." Oestreich also noted generally unenthusiastic responses from concertgoers, remarking, "And as Beth Clayton, a mezzo-soprano, feelingly delivered Mr. Ades's apocalyptic message [...] nearby patrons snoozed, one snoring loudly. The return message, evidently, is that the millennium will bring business as usual. It is surely possible." Reviewing a 2008 performance by the Los Angeles Philharmonic, Mark Swed of the Los Angeles Times called the music "riveting and extraordinary" and wrote, "A circular motif swirls through the orchestra, the sodden state. The mezzo sings in a flat, un-modulated tone, the voice of another world, unheeded, the Maya's Cassandra. The chorus sings Spanish and Latin texts of war from the 15th and 16th centuries. The brass section dances the steps of merry, murderous invaders. The piece turns into a dark lament in its second half. 'Ash,' the mezzo sings -- without vibrato, as if dazed -- 'feels no pain.'"

The music was similarly praised by Tom Service of The Guardian, who criticized American orchestras for failing to program the piece after the September 11 attacks. Service opined, "It was composed in 1999 as one of the New York Philharmonic's Messages for the Millennium. But these LA performances are only the second time the work has been heard in the US since then. The reason isn't hard to fathom. [...] with America then prosperous, the message scarcely chimed with the times. Later, after 9/11, Adès's dramatisation of the end of empire, its certainty that the cycle of rise and fall would repeat itself in contemporary America, was too raw for US orchestras to programme." He concluded:

Yet none of the soothsayings would matter if not for the strength of the composition and its performance. In the second movement, music of searing, visionary power suspends melodic lines and harmonies over a desolate orchestral texture; they float like clouds of ash over the sea. The piece ends with the voices of the conquistadors intoning quietly in Latin: "This is the victory by which our faith conquers the world." Their ghostly delivery is a projection of their own demise and finds an echo in the fate of today's America: imperial misadventures in the Middle East, the collapse of financial systems, and the notion that its time as the dominant power on the planet is over.

== See also ==
- List of compositions by Thomas Adès
