= Arcadiana =

1994 composition by Thomas Adès

Arcadiana, Op. 12, is a 1994 composition for string quartet written by the English composer Thomas Adès. The quartet was commissioned by the Endellion Quartet with contributions from the Holst Foundation.

== Structure ==
The work consists of seven movements played without pause:

1. Venezia notturna
2. Das klinget so herrlich, das klinget so schön
3. Auf dem Wasser zu singen
4. Et... (tango mortale)
5. L'Embarquement
6. O Albion
7. Lethe

== Style ==
The piece is written to evoke images of the idyll, and does so by employing many extended string techniques, such as harmonics and glissandi. The odd-numbered movements are all aquatic. The dynamic range is wide, with rapid changes, and the piece is rhythmically very complex.

The second movement is inspired by Mozart's opera The Magic Flute, and in the closing bars quotes the aria Der Hölle Rache.

The third movement alludes to Schubert's Lied of the same name.

The central movement, in a departure from the general style of the quartet, is loud and brash, an exaggeration of the tango. It is inspired by Nicolas Poussin's painting Et in Arcadia ego. Adès makes use of Bartók pizzicati in this movement to add to the staccato style.

L'Embarquement is inspired by the painting The Embarkation for Cythera by Jean-Antoine Watteau.

By far the most tonally and metrically traditional movement, O Albion is slow, quiet and nostalgic. The main focus is a 'sighing' motif, which is passed around the quartet, before the music comes to rest with a gently unresolved perfect cadence.

The final movement is named after the river of oblivion in Greek mythology. Short, soft, high-pitched figures are played by the violins and the viola, with many harmonics, whilst the cello plays a high and lyrical melody. The piece finishes with long, overlapping notes passed around the quartet, forming a melody out of perfect fifths. The notes are double-stopped, creating a 'spacious' effect which evokes the river which the movement represents.

== Reception ==
Arcadiana has been praised by music critics. Reviewing a 1999 performance by the Borromeo String Quartet, Allan Kozinn of The New York Times wrote, "Mr. Ades's Arcadiana, written in 1994, is meant to be an evocation of paradise in seven short movements. Paradise for Mr. Ades is a place of complexity rather than simplistic loveliness; in fact, the idyllic and the terrifying are closely intertwined here. One moment dark, sliding string figures evoke a dance of death; the next is a serene paean to England in slow, gracefully consonant chordal passages." He continued, "Mr. Ades evokes a pantheon of sorts in fleeting, subtle, half-submerged references to Mozart, Schubert, Elgar and Wagner. He provides scenery in stretches of descriptive scoring inspired by pastoral paintings of Poussin and Watteau." Reviewing a later recording of the piece, Richard Fairman of the Financial Times called it "a spellbinding early Adès classic" and said the piece "offers a series of ingenious and alluring snapshots." The music was also praised by Mark Swed of the Los Angeles Times, who remarked, "The accomplishment here [...] is that the music feels modern, the old world as contemporary dream."

Andrew Mellor of Gramophone was slightly more critical of the composition, however, observing, "I have reservations about Arcadiana, only because it shows how far Adès has come (since 1993) when viewed against a more recent masterpiece such as In Seven Days, which in a sense has the same goal but achieves more with less." However, Michael Oliver, also writing for Gramophone, had a more favorable view of the piece. He wrote, "Arcadiana [...] is a seven-movement string quartet whose central and longest movement (not very long: just over four minutes) contains an extraordinary range of precisely imagined, highly original textures and yet in its penultimate section can settle to a serene and wonderfully beautiful adagio whose sound and mood can only be conveyed by the adjective 'Beethovenian'."
