= De River =

The De is a river of Mizoram, northeastern India.
