= Nicky Spence =

Scottish operatic tenor

Nicholas Eliot Spence OBE (born 1983) is a Scottish operatic tenor who performs in opera, oratorio and recital in both the UK and internationally.

== Life and career ==
Spence was born and raised in Dumfries. He was educated at Wallace Hall in Thornhill where he had his first lessons with Margaret Davies aged 15 and attended Scottish Youth Theatre and the National Youth Music Theatre. He was accepted to the Guildhall School of Music and Drama and graduated with a Bachelor of Music in 2005. After his first year, he won the Kathleen Ferrier Society Young Singers Bursary.

In 2004, during his final year at Guildhall, Spence received a five-record contract with Universal Classics on the Decca label who promoted him as "The Scottish Tenor". His debut album My First Love, recorded with the Royal Philharmonic Orchestra, was released in 2007. That same year he was nominated for the "Young British Classical Performer of the Year" Classical Brit Award. During this time, he sang regularly on television and toured with Katherine Jenkins and Shirley Bassey.

However, when it came time to record his second album, Spence turned his back on the recording contract to pursue a legitimate opera career. He returned to the Guildhall School of Music and Drama to study on their Opera Studies course, studying there from 2007 to 2009 under John Llewelyn Evans, alongside training on British Youth Opera’s summer programme in 2008 and 2009. He then won a place at the National Opera Studio in 2009 where he won the Bruce Millar Gulliver Opera Prize. The following year he joined the English National Opera as one of their inaugural Harewood Artists.

As a Harewood Artist at ENO, Spence created the role of Brian in the world premiere of Nico Muhly's opera Two Boys in 2011. Other roles at ENO have included The Novice in Billy Budd directed by David Alden, David in Die Meistersinger von Nürnberg directed by Richard Jones, Steva in Jenůfa directed by David Alden, Alwa in Lulu directed by William Kentridge, and Francesco in Benvenuto Cellini directed by Terry Gilliam. He was nominated for the International Opera Awards as Young Singer of the Year in 2015 and was also one of ten artists included in the Times Breakthrough Award at the South Bank Sky Arts Awards.

Spence's appearances in international opera houses include Brian in Two Boys (Metropolitan Opera, 2013); Don Ottavio in Don Giovanni (New Zealand Opera, 2013); Steva in Jenufa (La Monnaie, 2014); Isacco in La gazza ladra (Oper Frankfurt, 2014); Tichon in Katya Kabanova (Seattle Opera, 2017); Captain Pirzel in Die Soldaten (Teatro Real, 2018); and The Big Prisoner in From the House of the Dead (Opéra de Lyon, 2019)

Spence was appointed Officer of the Order of the British Empire (OBE) in the 2023 Birthday Honours for services to music.

In 2024 Spence became President of ISM, following Pauline Black, and a vice president of British Youth Opera, where he is also alumnus. He was, along with Yuja Wang, a featured soloist at the 2026 Last Night of the Proms.

== Personal life ==
Spence is a patron of Blackheath Halls and their community opera company and of An Tobar and Mull Theatre, a multi art form creative hub on the Hebridean island of Mull. He is also active in the charity Help Musicians UK and president of Dumfries Musical Theatre Company. Spence's partner is pianist Dylan Perez and the two married on 1 January 2022.

== Discography ==
Spence's recordings include:

- Ralph Vaughan Williams: Complete Folk Songs, Vols. 1-4 – Mary Bevan (soprano), Nicky Spence (tenor), Roderick Williams (baritone), William Vann (piano), Thomas Gould (violin), Jack Liebeck (violin). Released 2020-2022. Label: Albion Records
- Frances-Hoad: Magic Lantern Tales – Nicky Spence (tenor), Sophie Daneman (soprano), Natalie Raybould (soprano), Verity Wingate (soprano), Anna Huntley (mezzo-soprano), Anna Huntley (mezzo-soprano), Sinead O'Kelly (mezzo-soprano), Philip Smith (baritone), Mark Stone (baritone), Collin Shay (countertenor), Edward Nieland (treble), Sholto Kynoch (piano). Released 2018. Label: Champs Hill Records
- Buxton Orr: Songs – Nicky Spence (tenor), Iain Burnside (piano), Edinburgh Quartet (ensemble). Released 2017. Label: Delphian
- Pavel Haas: Fata Morgana – Anita Watson (soprano), Anna Starushkevych (mezzo-soprano), Nicky Spence (tenor), James Platt (bass), Lada Valešová (piano), Navarra Quartet (ensemble). Released 2017. Label: Resonus
- Paradis Sur Terre: A French Songbook (songs by Caplet, Boulanger, Debussy, and Chaminade) – Nicky Spence (tenor), Malcolm Martineau (piano). Released 2016. Label: Chandos
- Purer than Pearl (songs and duets by Ralph Vaughan Williams) – Mary Bevan (soprano), Jennifer Johnston (mezzo-soprano), Nicky Spence (tenor), Johnny Herford (baritone), William Vann (piano), Thomas Gould (violin). Released 2016. Label: Albion Records
- Mark-Anthony Turnage: A Constant Obsession – Nicky Spence (tenor), Chamber Domaine (ensemble), Thomas Kemp (conductor). Released 2012. Label: Resonus
- George Alexander Macfarren: Robin Hood – Nicky Spence (tenor), Kay Jordan (soprano), George Hulbert (baritone), Louis Hurst (bass), John Molloy (bass), Victorian Opera Orchestra (ensemble), Ronald Corp (conductor). Released 2011. Label: Naxos
