= Violin Concerto (Adès) =

The Violin Concerto, subtitled Concentric Paths, is a composition for solo violin and chamber orchestra by the British composer Thomas Adès. It was jointly commissioned by the Berliner Festspiele and the Los Angeles Philharmonic with funding from the philanthropists Lenore and Bernard Greenberg. It was composed for the violinist Anthony Marwood, who gave the world premiere with the Chamber Orchestra of Europe in Berlin on September 4, 2005.

== Composition ==
=== Structure ===
Concentric Paths has a duration of roughly 20 minutes and is composed in three connected movements:

1. Rings
2. Paths
3. Rounds

=== Instrumentation ===
The work is scored for solo violin and an orchestra comprising two flutes, two oboes, two clarinets, two bassoons, three horns, two trumpets, trombone, tuba, timpani, percussion, and strings.

== Reception ==
The concerto has been praised by music critics. Richard S. Ginell of the Los Angeles Times wrote, "The Violin Concerto (Concentric Paths) is a good example of how Adès has been evolving over the last decade – the cynicism and cheekiness of youth giving way to a new lyrical bent, most apparent in the lengthy middle movement." Despite this praise, he added, "This is clearly an eloquent work that wears well, although I don’t think Adès has written his masterpiece quite yet." Richard Whitehouse of Gramophone also particularly lauded the second movement, observing, "the capricious outer movements enclose a central chaconne whose lyrically intense solo writing contrasts with the orchestra's volatile textures." Tom Service of The Guardian wrote, "In just 20 minutes, this three-movement piece does something magical. The way it swirls ethereally in the first movement, exerts a tragic and vice-like grip in the chaconne-like second part and finally propels you into the uninhibited flight of the finale is like being spun into an infinite space." He continued:

Yet you never lose your footing, never lose a sense of where you are, even as you glimpse an unbounded region out there behind the notes. Technically, that's because of Adès's seemingly infinitely subtle and infinitely expandable tonal universe. As with all really good music, however, it's a piece whose detail is endlessly absorbing but whose emotional impact is immediate and impossible to resist.

== Recordings ==
Concentric Paths has twice been commercially recorded. The first recording, by Marwood and the Chamber Orchestra of Europe under Adès, was released through EMI Classics in 2010. The second is by the violinist Augustin Hadelich and the Royal Liverpool Philharmonic Orchestra under Hannu Lintu and was released through Avie Records in 2014.
