= 1994 International Rostrum of Composers =

Classical music rostrum

The 40th edition of the International Rostrum of Composers took place from May 9–13, 1994. It was the third time in a row a Finnish composer won the senior category.

== Recommended Works ==
  - (United Kingdom) Thomas Adès - Living Toys
  - (Denmark) Mogens Christensen - Winter Light
  - (France) Frédéric Durieux - Marges III
  - (Germany) Heiner Goebbels - Ou Bien le Débarquement Désastreux
  - (Finland) Eero Hämeenniemi - Nattuvannar
  - (Canada) Chris Harman - Concerto for Oboe and Strings
  - (Finland) Jouni Kaipainen - Carpe Diem!
  - (Japan) Yoshihiro Kanno - The Time of Mirrors
  - (Poland) Stanisław Krupowicz - Fin de Siècle
  - (Switzerland) Hanspeter Kyburz - Cells
  - (Poland) Paweł Szymański - Miserere

=== Under-30 Category ===
  - (United Kingdom) Thomas Adès - Living Toys
  - (Canada) Chris Harman - Concerto for Oboe and Strings
  - (France) Eric Tanguy - Jubilate
