= Calder Quartet =

String quartet

- Origin: Los Angeles, California, United States
- Genres: Contemporary, classical
- Occupation: Chamber ensemble
- Years active: 1998–present
- Members: Benjamin Jacobson; Andrew Bulbrook; Jonathan Moerschel; Eric Byers
- Website: www.calderquartet.com

The Calder Quartet (CQ) is a string quartet based in Los Angeles, California. Founded in 1998 at the University of Southern California, the group takes its name from American sculptor Alexander Calder. The ensemble is currently composed of its founding members, including violinists Benjamin Jacobson and Tereza Stanislav, violist Jonathan Moerschel, and cellist Eric Byers. Los Angeles Times music critic, Mark Swed called the CQ "one of America's great string quartets." In 2014, the CQ was awarded one of Lincoln Center's prestigious Avery Fisher Career Grants for "professional assistance and recognition to talented instrumentalists who the Recommendation Board and Executive Committee believe have great potential."

== History ==
The Calder Quartet formed at the University of Southern California’s Thornton School of Music and continued studies at the Colburn School with Ronald Leonard, where they were part of that school's first graduating class. While at the Juilliard School, they received the Artist Diploma in Chamber Music Studies as the Juilliard Graduate Resident String Quartet. They have also studied with Professor Eberhard Feltz at the Hochschule für Musik "Hanns Eisler" in Berlin. In 2009, the Calder Quartet received the 2009 ASCAP Adventurous Programming Award. They eventually became assistant faculty and quartet in residence at the Colburn School. In 2003, the Calder Quartet joined with composer Matt McBane, to found the Carlsbad Music Festival. The CQ has been Founding Ensemble-in-Residence since the festival's inception. In March 2013, the CQ was featured in and appeared on the cover of the magazine The Strad.

In 2017 the quartet signed an exclusive global recording contract with PENTATONE. CQ's first album for the label will focus on Beethoven quartets.

Violinist Tereza Stanislav joined the quartet in 2019 replacing Andrew Bulbrook who was an original member of the quartet since its inception in 1998.

== Calder Performing Arts Organization ==
On September 14, 2011 the Calder Quartet launched a nonprofit called the Calder Performing Arts Organization (CPAO) with the purpose of commissioning and recording contemporary music, as well as the support of the Calder Quartet's educational outreach performances in Southern California. The nonprofit was inaugurated at the Blum & Poe Gallery in Los Angeles with a joint recital with composer Terry Riley and featured a performance environment created by long-time Calder collaborator (and album cover artist) Dave Muller. The CPAO funded the recording of Eclectic Currents, a 2014 album featuring 12 emerging composers who have written for the Calder Quartet. The CPAO has commissioned works with partners including the Getty Center and the Barbican Centre.

== Commissions, premieres, and appearances ==
The Calder Quartet has commissioned or premiered more than 30 works from established and emerging composers, including Terry Riley, Thomas Adès, Christopher Rouse, Peter Eötvös, Andrew Norman, David Lang (upcoming, June 2014 with Los Angeles Master Chorale), Mark Mothersbaugh, and Aaron Jay Kernis. Christopher Rouse dedicated his String Quartet No. 3 to the Calder Quartet, which the group premiered in 2010. The Calder Quartet has performed at venues including Carnegie Hall, Lincoln Center, Walt Disney Concert Hall, the Hollywood Bowl, the Aspen Music Festival, the Stockholm Konserthuset, Esterhazy Palace, the Edinburgh Festival, the Barbican Centre, Central Park SummerStage (NYC), and the Coachella Valley Music and Arts Festival. In 2012, CQ was featured in a live in-studio performance on KCRW's Morning Becomes Eclectic. Calder Quartet made its Lincoln Center debut for Mostly Mozart in a program consisting of Thomas Adès Arcadiana and Beethoven's Op. 131 string quartet, a performance heralded by the New York Times as "superb." Past and current collaborators include Joshua Bell, Edgar Meyer, Thomas Adès, Richard Reed Parry, Iva Bittová, Anne-Marie McDermott, Philip Glass, Joby Talbot, Steven Mackey, Fred Frith, The National, The Airborne Toxic Event, Vampire Weekend, Cass McCombs, Dan Deacon, Andrew WK, Paul Neubauer, Fucked Up, So Percussion, Jóhann Jóhannsson, The Dirty Projectors, film and television composer Bear McCreary, and the Cleveland Orchestra. In the fall of 2013 the CQ was in residence at the Metropolitan Museum of Art, performing the complete cycle of 6 Bartók string quartets along with special guests David Longstreth (from The Dirty Projectors) and Iva Bittová. Music by Peter Eötvös will also be featured. Alongside The Airborne Toxic Event and Vampire Weekend, the CQ has performed on the Tonight Show with Jay Leno, the Late Show with David Letterman, Jimmy Kimmel Live, the Tonight Show with Conan O'Brien, and the Late Late Show with Craig Ferguson. CQ has appeared on albums by The Airborne Toxic Event, Lavender Diamond, and The Naked and Famous.

== Classical recordings ==
Album title	Label
Calder Quartet: Ravel, Ades, and Mozart	Self-published
Mozart Piano Concerti K. 414, 415, and 449 with Anne-Marie McDermott	Bridge Records
The Edge of Light, Gloria Cheng & Calder Quartet	Harmonia Mundi
The Chamber Works of Christopher Rouse	E1-Transfiguration
Terry Riley: Early String Chamber Music (self-release, limited edition of 75 vinyl records created by Dave Muller)	75 Records
Eclectic Currents	Pentatone

== Film and television scores ==
Calder Quartet can be heard on film and television soundtracks including Starz/BBC Worldwide's Da Vinci's Demons (scored by Bear McCreary), Ruby Sparks, and the documentary film The Short Game (scored by Mark Mothersbaugh). In 2013, Da Vinci's Demons won an Emmy for Outstanding Original Main Title Theme Music, a theme which features the CQ prominently.

== See also ==
- List of string quartet ensembles
- The Airborne Toxic Event
