= Doublethink Theatre =

British live theatre company (2006–2011)

Doublethink Theatre was a London-based theatre company, producing a diverse mixture of work, from classical to new writing, in intimate spaces.

It was founded in 2006 by Patrick Myles, and its patron was the English actor Brian Blessed.

The company's premiere production was Thomas Middleton's The Revenger's Tragedy, in a new adaptation by Meredith Oakes, which played at the Southwark Playhouse. Subsequent productions include Aleksandr Ostrovsky's A Family Affair, in a translation by Nick Dear, at the Arcola Theatre, Christopher Fry's The Lady's Not for Burning at the Finborough Theatre, and in a co-production with TFP, Orwell: A Celebration in an adaptation by Dominic Cavendish at the Trafalgar Studios.

The company was the recipient of the Society of London Theatre New Producer Bursary.

The company appears to have ceased operation in 2011, when its dormant Twitter and website accounts stopped updating.

== Productions ==
- 2006 A Family Affair by Aleksandr Ostrovsky, translated by Nick Dear
- 2006 The Revenger's Tragedy by Thomas Middleton, adapted by Meredith Oakes
- 2007 The Lady's Not for Burning by Christopher Fry
- 2009 Orwell: A Celebration adapted by Dominic Cavendish
- 2009 The Spanish Tragedy, by Thomas Kyd
