= The Exterminating Angel (opera) =

Opera by Thomas Adès

- Opera by Thomas Adès
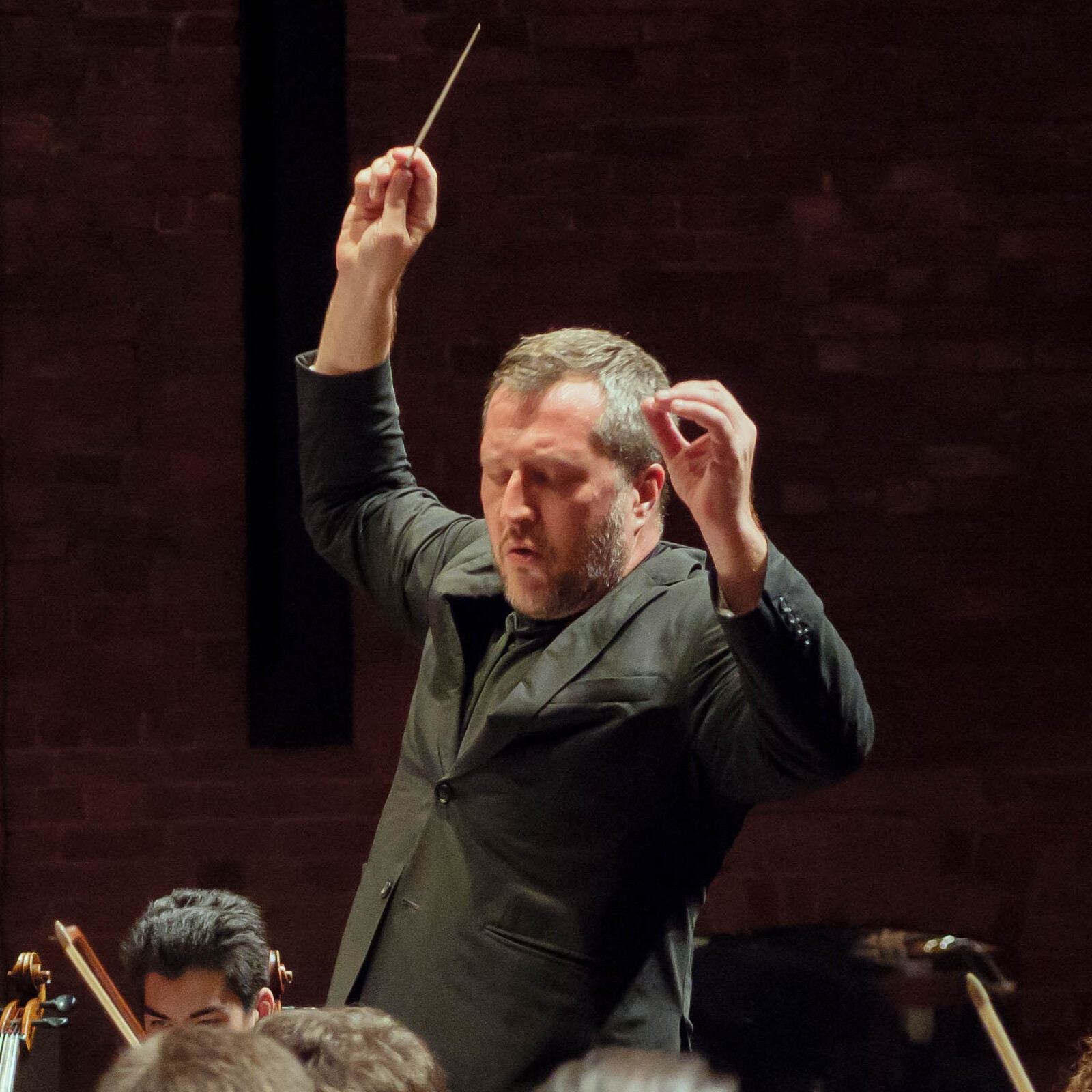
- Thomas Adès conducting the National Youth Orchestra of Great Britain in 2017
- Librettist: Tom Cairns
- Based on: The Exterminating Angel by Luis Buñuel
- Premiere: 28 July 2016; Haus für Mozart, Salzburg Festival

The Exterminating Angel is an English-language opera in three acts, with music by Thomas Adès, and libretto by Tom Cairns in collaboration with Adès. The opera is based on the 1962 film of the same name by Luis Buñuel. The opera, Adès' third, was a joint commission between the Salzburg Festival, the Royal Opera House, Covent Garden, the Metropolitan Opera and the Royal Danish Opera.

The opera received its world premiere on 28 July 2016, at the Haus für Mozart, Salzburg. Adès' first-ever commission for the Salzburg Festival, the Salzburg production received four performances. The UK premiere was at the Royal Opera House, Covent Garden, on 24 April 2017. The North American premiere took place on 26 October of the same year at the Metropolitan Opera. For all of these stagings, Cairns was the stage director, with sets and costumes by Hildegard Bechtler, lighting by Jon Clark, videography by Tal Yarden, and choreography by Amir Hosseinpour.

Adès had been interested in adapting the film into an opera since 2000. Copyright issues over the film and the commission for Adès' second opera, The Tempest, delayed his eventual start on this opera.

The role of Leticia required soprano Audrey Luna to sing an A above high C, which is the highest documented sung note in the history of the Metropolitan Opera. The Metropolitan Opera transmitted the 18 November 2017 performance of the opera to cinemas worldwide as part of the Metropolitan Opera Live in HD series; that performance has subsequently been issued on DVD and was streamed online on 5 June, 15 November, and 10 December 2020.

The opera received a new staging at the Paris Opera in 2024, in a revised version by Adès.

== Roles ==
Role	Voice type	Premiere cast, 28 July 2016 Haus für Mozart, Salzburg	UK premiere cast, 24 April 2017 Royal Opera House, Covent Garden, London	North America premiere cast, 26 October 2017 Metropolitan Opera, New York City	Danish premiere cast, 23 March 2018 Royal Danish Opera, Copenhagen
Edmundo de Nobile	tenor	Charles Workman	Charles Workman	Joseph Kaiser	Gert-Henning Jensen
Lucia de Nobile	soprano	Amanda Echalaz	Amanda Echalaz	Amanda Echalaz	Gisela Stille
Leticia Meynar	soprano	Audrey Luna	Audrey Luna	Audrey Luna	Kerstin Avemo
Leonora Palma	mezzo-soprano	Anne Sofie von Otter	Anne Sofie von Otter	Alice Coote	Randi Stene
Silvia de Avíla	soprano	Sally Matthews	Sally Matthews	Sally Matthews	Sine Bundgaard
Francisco de Avíla	countertenor	Iestyn Davies	Iestyn Davies	Iestyn Davies	Morten Grove Frandsen
Blanca Delgado	mezzo-soprano	Christine Rice	Christine Rice	Christine Rice	Hanne Fischer
Alberto Roc	baritone	Thomas Allen	Thomas Allen	Rod Gilfry	David Kempster
Beatriz	soprano	Sophie Bevan	Sophie Bevan	Sophie Bevan	Sofie Elkjær Jensen
Eduardo	tenor	Ed Lyon	Ed Lyon	David Portillo	Alexander Sprague
Raúl Yebenes	tenor	Frédéric Antoun	Frédéric Antoun	Frédéric Antoun	Paul Curievici
Colonel Álvaro Gómez	tenor	David Adam Moore	David Adam Moore	David Adam Moore	Jens Søndergaard
Señor Russell	baritone	Sten Byriel	Sten Byriel	Kevin Burdette	Simon Wilding
Doctor Carlos Conde	bass-baritone	John Tomlinson	John Tomlinson	John Tomlinson	Sten Byriel
Julio, the butler	baritone	Morgan Moody	Morgan Moody	Christian van Horn	Simon Duus
Lucas, the footman	tenor	John Irvin	Hubert Francis	John Irvin	Magnus Gislason
Enrique, the waiter	tenor	Franz Gürtelschmied	Thomas Atkins	Ian Koziara	Jens Christian Tvilum
Pablo, the cook	baritone	Rafael Fingerlos	James Cleverton	Paul Corona	Magnus Ingemund Kjeldstad
Meni, a maid	soprano	Frances Pappas	Elizabeth Atherton	Mary Dunleavy	Sara Madeleine Swietlicki
Camila, a maid	mezzo-soprano	Anna Maria Dur	Anne Marie Gibbons	Edyta Kulczak/Catherine Cook	Elisabeth Halling
Servants				Andrea Coleman, Marc Persing	
Padre Sansón	baritone	Cheyne Davidson	Wyn Pencarreg	Jeff Mattsey	Kyungil Ko
Yoli	child role	Leonhard Radhauer	Jai Sai Mehta	Lucas Mann, Christian Harmston	Arthur Zacharias Ulf Greve
Musicians					
Ondes Martenot		Cynthia Millar	Cynthia Millar	Cynthia Millar	
Piano			Finnegan Downie Dear	Dimitri Dover	
Orchestra		ORF Radio-Symphonieorchester Wien	Orchestra of the Royal Opera House, Covent Garden	Metropolitan Opera Orchestra	
Chorus		Salzburger Bachchor (Salzburg Bach Choir)	Chorus of the Royal Opera House, Covent Garden	Metropolitan Opera Chorus	
Conductor		Thomas Adès	Thomas Adès	Thomas Adès	

== Synopsis ==
The setting is the mansion of Lucía and Edmundo de Nobile, on the Calle de la Providencia in an unnamed city, in the 1960s.

Act 1

The Nobiles are expecting guests for a dinner at their mansion in honour of the opera singer Leticia Meynar. However, the footman Lucas runs away, and the butler Julio does not stop him. The maids Meni and Camila also try to leave. The Nobiles arrive after attending a performance at the opera. When the guests go into the dining room, Meni, Camila, and several other servants make their escape. The guests repeat their entrance, which momentarily disconcerts Edmundo de Nobile.

At dinner, Nobile toasts Leticia. As Lucía announces the first course, the waiter spills it on the floor. Lucía decides to postpone her other 'entertainments', and a performing bear and several lambs are removed to the garden. The rest of the servants, except for Julio, flee the house, despite Lucía's protestations.

In the drawing room, Blanca performs at the piano. The engaged couple Eduardo and Beatriz dance. Leonora flirts with Dr. Conde, who declines to dance with her. She kisses him instead. Conde then confides to the explorer Raúl Yebenes that Leonora is gravely ill and does not have long to live. The guests praise Blanca's performance, and then encourage Leticia to sing. Señor Russell protests that she has performed enough for the evening. Several guests proclaim that they will not leave the room until Leticia has sung for them.

Several guests prepare to depart, whilst Roc falls asleep. In the cloakroom, Lucía gives her secret lover, Colonel Álvaro Gómez, a fleeting kiss. The guests become lethargic and distracted. Although it is now very late, none of them attempts to leave. Though confused, Edmundo graciously offers lodging to those who wish to stay. Russell and Colonel Gómez are horrified as some guests remove their tailcoats, but eventually they too lie down to sleep. Eduardo and Beatriz retreat to a private corner to spend their first night together.

Act 2

The guests wake the following morning. Silvia says that she slept poorly. Conde examines Russell, and diagnoses him as terminally ill. Julio is supposed to prepare breakfast, but reports that no supplies have arrived at the mansion. When Lucía tries to take some of the ladies to her bedroom to freshen up, they cannot leave the dining room. Blanca frets about her children, but even she and her husband Alberto Roc, a conductor, cannot leave. Silvia finds this situation humorous, with the knowledge that her son Yoli is safe with his private tutor, Padre Sansón. Julio approaches with coffee and the leftovers from the previous evening's dinner. Leticia entreats Julio not to enter the drawing room, but in vain. Blanca is desperate, while Raúl sees no reason to get overly excited. Francisco complains that he cannot possibly stir his coffee with a teaspoon. When sent to procure coffee spoons, Julio now finds himself trapped in the drawing room.

Evening approaches. Russell's condition has worsened, as he has fallen into a coma and needs urgent medical care. When they have nothing left to drink, the guests begin to panic. Conde pleads for calm, although even he seems to be losing his composure. Raúl becomes aggressive and blames Edmundo for the situation. Francisco is frantic and resists all attempts to calm him. Russell unexpectedly regains consciousness, expressing relief that he will not live to experience the 'extermination'. The thought of dying amongst all these people, rather than alone with Eduardo, troubles Beatriz.

During the night, Russell dies. Conde and Colonel Gómez haul his corpse into the closet, as Eduardo and Beatriz watch secretly.

Act 3

Police guarding the mansion drive back a crowd of people gathered outside. Although some people break through the police ranks, no one can enter the house.

In the drawing room, Julio and Raúl burst a water pipe. The guests rush desperately to quench their thirst. Tormented with hunger, everyone begins to behave with increased irrationality. Blanca combs only one side of her hair, driving Francisco to distraction. Unable to find the pills for his stomach ulcer, Francisco thinks that someone has hidden them. Raúl goads Francisco about his relationship with his sister, and the two men exchange insults. Edmundo tries with difficulty to keep the peace. Leonora, in great pain, entreats the assistance of Dr Conde and the Virgin Mary. Blanca's smell nauseates Francisco, and he again loses his nerves.

Whilst delirious, Leonora sees a disembodied hand wandering around the drawing room. Trying to stop it, she stabs Blanca's hand with a dagger. In the closet, Eduardo and Beatriz decide to kill themselves. Roc assaults Leticia, but Raúl accuses Colonel Gómez instead. Edmundo is injured during the ensuing scuffle. The lambs wander from the garden into the drawing room.

The army has quarantined the mansion. Padre Sansón appears with Yoli, and the crowd demands that Yoli be sent inside. Encouraged by the crowd, Yoli tries to enter the mansion, but is unable to.

The guests have slaughtered the lambs and are cooking them on a makeshift fire. Leonora recalls a premonition from the night of the opera performance, and attempts a magic ritual with Blanca and Leticia. The ritual fails, but she declares that innocent blood is needed. Francisco discovers Eduardo and Beatriz's bodies in the closet. In a fresh quarrel, Raúl tosses Francisco's box of pills out of the drawing room. Silvia cradles the corpse of one of the lambs in her arms, thinking that she is rocking Yoli to sleep.

The bear appears across the threshold. Gradually the idea spreads among the guests that a sacrifice is required to secure their liberation, specifically the death of Edmundo. Conde and Colonel Gómez unsuccessfully try to dissuade this idea. Edmundo declares that he will sacrifice himself, but Leticia interrupts him. She realises that, at this moment, each of them is in exactly the same place as at the start of their strange captivity. With her encouragement, the others hesitantly repeat their actions from that first night, but one character acts differently at one key point. This change allows the characters to approach the threshold and finally to cross it. The guests and the crowd outside the mansion meet.

== Instrumentation ==
Pit Musicians

- 3 flutes (2nd doubles on piccolo I and bass flute; 3rd doubles on piccolo II and alto flute)
- 3 oboes (3rd doubles on cor anglais)
- 3 clarinets in A (3rd doubles on bass clarinet)
- 3 bassoons (3rd doubles on contraforte or contrabassoon with low A)
- 4 horns in F (optionally doubling Wagner tubas)
- 3 trumpets in B♭
- 3 trombones
- tuba
- percussion (4 players): timpani & roto-toms, glockenspiel, xylophone, tubular bells, 6 antique cymbals, small steel drum, 4 saucepans, 4 tunes gongs, 2 bell plates, bass bell (in B♭), newspaper, small mark tree, metal wind chimes, 2 pairs of castanets, machine-mounted castanets, small & large maracas, metal maracas, double guiro, cabasa, 3 small whips, door slam, small anvil, 2 small woodblocks, small ratchet, tambourine, 2 small bongos, deep log drum, tavola, washboard, lion's roar, 2 large stones, 2 spring coils, triangle, small cowbell, 2 pairs of clashed cymbals, 2 suspended cymbals, hi-hat, 2 sizzle cymbals, 2 tam-tams, 2 side drums, tenor drum, kick bass drum, bass drum with mounted cymbal
- piano
- harp
- guitar
- ondes Martenot
- strings (including 1/32 size violins)

Offstage Musicians

- percussion: 4 players playing 8 church bells or bass handbells, plus (minimum) 4 players playing mixture of bass, tenor and side drums. Parts can be double or played by the same four players as the church bells (optionally)

== Symphony ==
The Exterminating Angel Symphony, composed in 2020, is a four-movement orchestral rendering of music from the opera. It was first performed on 4 August 2021 at Symphony Hall, Birmingham, by the City of Birmingham Symphony Orchestra conducted by Mirga Gražinytė-Tyla. A repeat performance took place at the BBC Proms in London the next day.
