= Frances Pappas =

Canadian-Greek operatic singer

Frances Pappas (born 27 June 1964) is a Canadian-Greek operatic mezzo-soprano.

== Life ==
Pappas was born in Toronto. After completing her studies at the University of Toronto she continued her studies with a scholarship from the Arts Council of Ontario at the University of Music and Performing Arts Vienna. She had her first permanent engagement at the Stadttheater Gießen. Afterwards, she gave guest performances as a freelance artist, among others at the Wiener Festwochen, at the Theater an der Wien and at the Konzerthaus Wien. After a guest performance at the Nuremberg State Opera, where she sang Dorabella in Così fan tutte, she became a permanent ensemble member in Nuremberg. There, she sang the title roles in La Cenerentola and in Hansel and Gretell. For the role of Mélisande in Pelléas et Mélisande she was awarded Best Young Singer by the professional journal Opernwelt.

Pappas made her debut in 2005 at the Wigmore Hall in London with Lieder by Johannes Brahms. Further concert appearances with the Toronto Symphony Orchestra, the Barcelona Symphony and Catalonia National Orchestra, the Gewandhausorchester and the MDR-Rundfunkchor followed. In 2008 she was appointed Kammersängerin by the Bavarian State Government. Since the 2011/12 season, Pappas has been a member of the ensemble of the Salzburger Landestheater. In 2016, Pappas made her debut at the Salzburg Festival in 2015 and in 2016 in the world premiere of the opera The Exterminating Angel by British composer Thomas Adès.

Pappas is married to the actor Gero Nievelstein. The couple has two children.
