= Piano Concerto (Adès) =

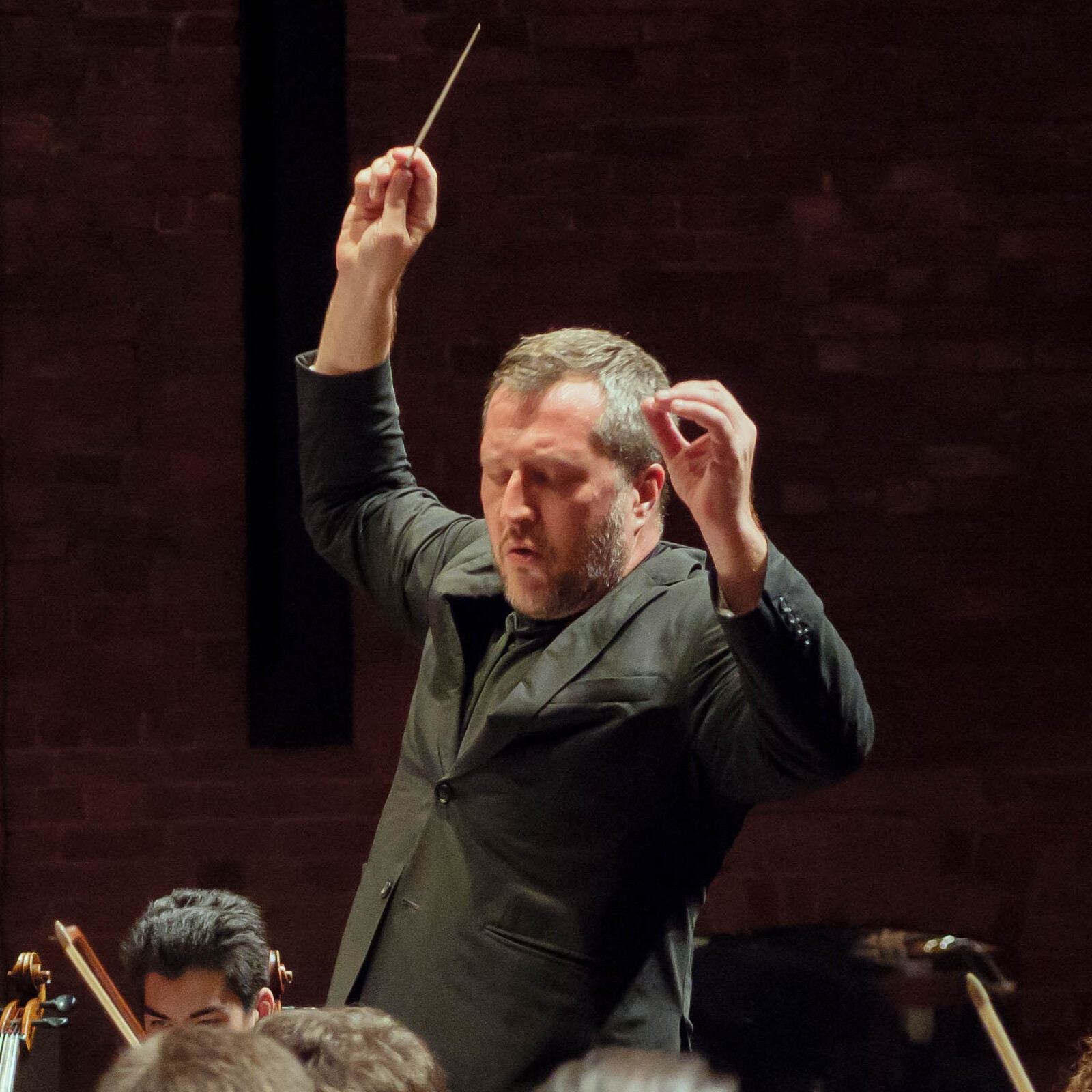
Thomas Adès conducting the National Youth Orchestra of Great Britain in 2017

The Concerto for Piano and Orchestra is a piano concerto by the British composer Thomas Adès. The work was commissioned by the Boston Symphony Orchestra for the pianist Kirill Gerstein and was completed in 2018. It was first performed by Gerstein and the Boston Symphony Orchestra conducted by the composer at Symphony Hall, Boston, on 7 March 2019. The piece is Adès's second piano concerto following In Seven Days in 2008.

== Composition ==
The Piano Concerto has a performance duration of approximately 22 minutes and is cast in three movements in the traditional fast–slow–fast form:

1. Allegramente
2. Andante gravemente
3. Allegro gioioso

=== Instrumentation ===
The work is scored for solo piano and a large orchestra comprising three flutes (3rd doubling piccolo and alto flute), three oboes (3rd doubling cor anglais), three clarinets (1st in B♭, 2nd in A, and 3rd in B♭ doubling bass clarinet), three bassoons (3rd doubling contrabassoon), four horns, two trumpets, three trombones, tuba, timpani, rototoms, three percussionists, and strings.

== Reception ==
Adès's Piano Concerto has been highly praised by music critics. Zoë Madonna of The Boston Globe lauded the world premiere as "an auspicious meeting of giants" between Adès and Gerstein. Aaron Keebaugh of the Boston Classical Review wrote, "Throughout its thirty-minute span, the composer paints a bright sonic picture through thorny dissonances and wild chromatic diversions. Its melodies unfold through quick-changing meters to form asymmetric shapes, with orchestral tuttis never seeming to fall on the beat." He added, "The effect is mesmerizing, and the Concerto for Piano and Orchestra stands as Adès' greatest achievement to date." Anthony Tommasini of The New York Times enthusiastically wrote, "This breathless, 20-minute concerto, structured in three essentially traditional movements (fast, slow, fast), comes across as zesty and accessible. But don't be fooled. Just below the surface, the music sizzles with modernist harmonies, fractured phrases, gaggles of counterpoint and lyrical strands that keep breaking into skittish bits. The finale is a riotous, clattering, assaultive romp. I can’t wait to hear it again." The music was also praised by Alex Ross of The New Yorker.

Reviewing a recording of the work, the music was later praised by the music critics Richard Fairman of the Financial Times and Tom Huizenga of NPR, who declared, "It may be the most attractive concerto so far this century."

== Recording ==
A recording of the Piano Concerto's world premiere performance was released on album together with Adès's Totentanz through Deutsche Grammophon on 28 February 2020.
