= Audrey Luna =

American opera singer

Audrey Luna (born 21 October 1978, in Salem, Oregon,) is an American soprano who won a Grammy Award in 2014 for Best Opera Recording of Thomas Adès's The Tempest and is the record holder for singing the highest written note at the Metropolitan Opera. Luna regularly performs on stages in America and Europe, including the Metropolitan Opera, Vienna State Opera, Royal Opera House, Houston Grand Opera, La Fenice in Venice, Lyric Opera of Chicago, Den Norske Opera, Pittsburgh Opera, and Opéra de Montréal.

== Career ==
Luna completed a BMus (2001) at Portland State University, followed by a MMus at the University of Cincinnati College-Conservatory of Music. She made her debut at the Metropolitan Opera (Met) as the Queen of the Night in Julie Taymor's production of Mozart's The Magic Flute, and continued with roles such as Najade in Ariadne auf Naxos and Fiakermilli in Arabella, both by R. Strauss, and Olympia in Offenbach's The Tales of Hoffmann.

About her performance of Ariel in The Tempest at the Metropolitan Opera, The New York Times said, "Mr. Adès's Ariel is a dazzling creation, and Ms. Luna conquers the role."

The Calder Quartet and Luna toured Europe in 2016 with Péter Eötvös's song cycle The Sirens.

In 2017, Luna set the record for singing the highest written note on the Metropolitan Opera stage, A♮_{6}, during the American premiere production of Thomas Adès' new opera The Exterminating Angel; Luna was part of that opera's world premiere at the Salzburg Festival in 2016, and a production by the Royal Opera House, London, in 2017.

Other roles in Luna's repertoire include Zerbinetta in Ariadne auf Naxos, the title role in Donizetti's Lucia di Lammermoor, Madame Mao in Adams' Nixon in China, Gilda in Verdi's Rigoletto, the title role in Lakmé by Delibes, and Chief of the Gepopo in Ligeti's Le Grand Macabre. In the 2017/18 season, she sang two Donizetti roles for the first time, Norina in Don Pasquale and Marie in La fille du régiment.

Luna has appeared on the concert stage with Berlin Philharmonic, London Symphony Orchestra, New York Philharmonic, Los Angeles Philharmonic, San Francisco Symphony, Minnesota Orchestra, Seattle Symphony, and others. Her concert repertoire includes Brahms' Requiem, Orff's Carmina Burana, Handel's Messiah, Unsuk Chin's Cantatrix Sopranica, Makris' Symphony for Soprano and Strings, Vivaldi's Gloria, Ligeti's Requiem and Le Grand Macabre, George Crumb's Star-Child, Amy Beach's Grand Mass, and Debussy's Le Martyre de saint Sébastien.

== Discography ==
- Thomas Adès, The Tempest, Deutsche Grammophon DVD – Awards: Diapason d'Or, Grammy Award for Best Opera Recording
- Péter Eötvös, The Sirens, with Calder Quartet, BMC Records CD
