= Tom Sutcliffe (opera critic) =

British opera critic (born 1943)

- Born: 4 June 1943 (age 83); Norwich, England
- Occupations: Journalist, critic, author

Tom Sutcliffe (born 4 June 1943) is an English opera critic, author and journalist. He worked as a countertenor and in early-music management before becoming a critic for The Guardian, Vogue and the Evening Standard. His book Believing in Opera (1996) argues for the importance of staging and the director in opera. He has also been a lay member of the General Synod of the Church of England for the Diocese of Southwark.

== Early life ==
Sutcliffe was born in Norwich in 1943. He grew up on the south coast of England, in Portsmouth and later Emsworth, where his father was frequently away at sea.

=== Choir and school ===
In 1952, shortly before his ninth birthday, Sutcliffe auditioned for the choir of Chichester Cathedral, having never previously sung in a choir, and joined it that May as a chorister. He later recalled his time as a chorister at the Prebendal School, Chichester, where the organist and choirmaster was Horace Hawkins.

He then attended Hurstpierpoint College, where he was a choral scholar for four years and held scholarships for pupils needing financial support, including one administered by the Royal Navy.

=== Oxford ===
Sutcliffe went up to the University of Oxford in 1960 and studied there until 1963. He was awarded an academical clerkship at Magdalen College, Oxford, under the college's organist and choirmaster Bernard Rose, at the age of sixteen years and eight months.

== Career ==
=== Music ===
From 1963 to 1965 Sutcliffe taught English at the Central Tutorial School for Young Musicians (now the Purcell School), and from 1965 to 1971 he was manager of the early-music group Musica Reservata. He sang as a countertenor in the choir of Westminster Cathedral from 1966 to 1970, and was an alto soloist in Nikolaus Harnoncourt's recording of Bach's St Matthew Passion.

=== Journalism and criticism ===
From 1968 Sutcliffe worked on the magazine Music & Musicians, first as advertisement manager and later as editor, until 1973. He was music, opera and drama critic for Vogue from 1975 to 1987, opera critic of The Guardian from 1973 to 1996, and has written for the Evening Standard since 1996. He also wrote for Opera News. A reviewer in 1996 described him as a critic who had written about opera for The Guardian and the Evening Standard and who was an advocate of theatrical innovation in opera production.

He contributed a chapter, "Technology and interpretation: aspects of 'modernism'", to The Cambridge Companion to Twentieth-Century Opera (2005). He appears in Lindsay Anderson's documentary Is That All There Is? (1992).

== Writing ==
=== Believing in Opera ===
Sutcliffe's book Believing in Opera (Faber and Faber, 1996) argues that the opera director is the true interpreter of a work and that staging is the real test of a production. He defends innovative, theatrically "truthful" productions against conventional ones and criticises music critics who resist theatrical change. About two-thirds of the book consists of detailed accounts of productions by directors he admires, including Patrice Chéreau, Ruth Berghaus, David Alden, Richard Jones and Peter Sellars.

Reviewing the book in The Irish Times, Arminta Wallace described it as a survey of contemporary opera that traces the development of modern production from Peter Brook's work at Covent Garden in the late 1940s to Chéreau's 1970s staging of the Ring at Bayreuth. She called Sutcliffe "provocative and opinionated" and predicted that the book would become a reference work for opera lovers. John Rosselli, in Times Higher Education, found the production accounts useful as records of transient stagings and the argument worth debating, but questioned whether theatre should take priority over music and saw inconsistencies in Sutcliffe's position on innovation in staging versus musical text.

=== Other works ===
Sutcliffe edited The Faber Book of Opera (2000), a collection of writings about opera.

== Church of England ==
Sutcliffe has served as a lay member of the General Synod for the Diocese of Southwark. In November 2002 he tabled a private member's motion in the Synod calling for entry to cathedrals to remain free of charge.

== Personal life ==
Sutcliffe married the author, playwright and librettist Meredith Oakes in 1973; they have two children.

== Publications ==
- Believing in Opera (Faber and Faber, 1996). ISBN 978-0-571-17809-4
- The Faber Book of Opera (editor; Faber and Faber, 2000). ISBN 978-0-571-20684-1
