= Polaris (composition) =

2010 composition by Thomas Adès

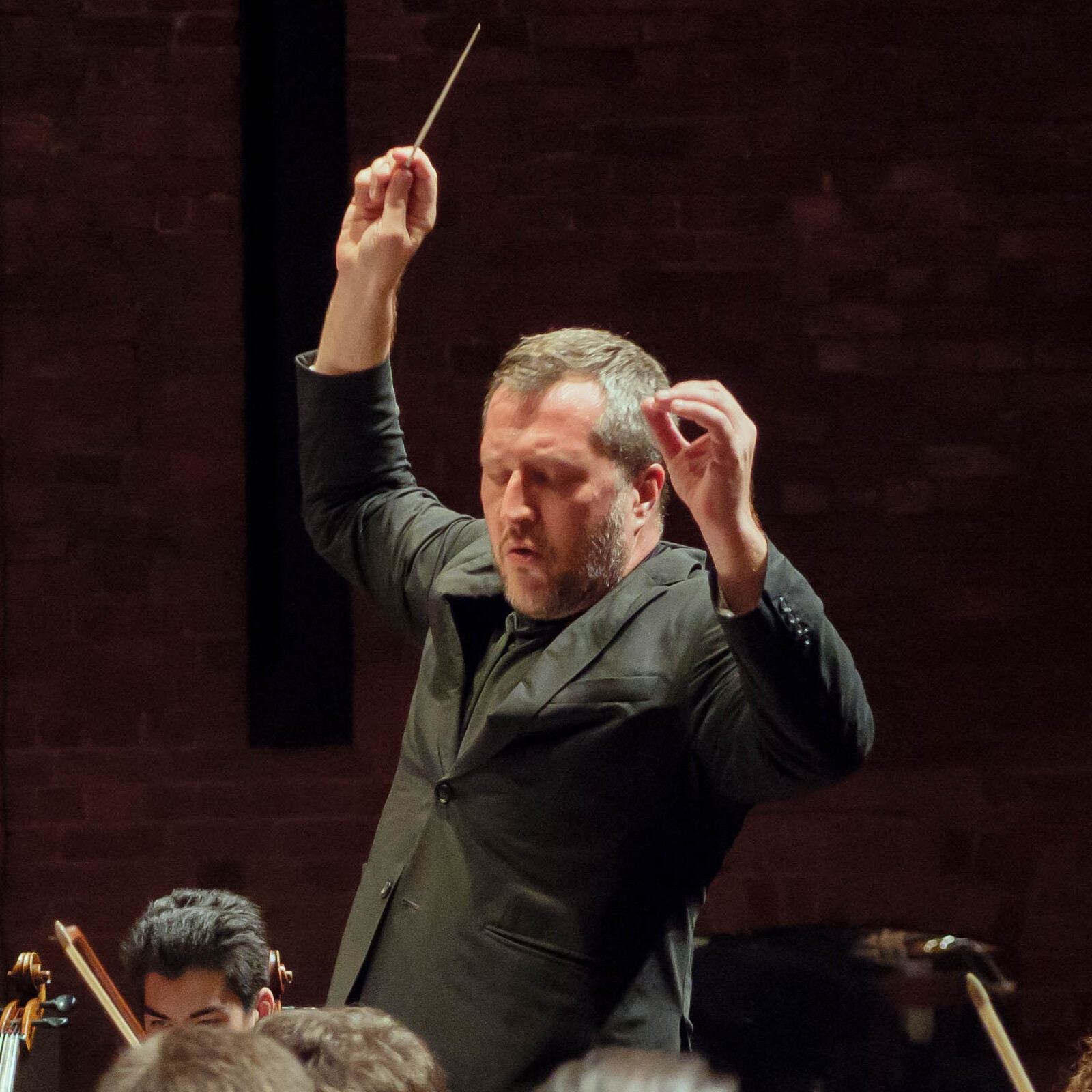
Thomas Adès conducting the National Youth Orchestra of Great Britain in 2017

Polaris: Voyage for Orchestra is an orchestral composition by the British composer Thomas Adès. The work was co-commissioned by the New World Symphony under the direction of Michael Tilson Thomas for the opening of the New World Center. The New World Symphony was joined in commission by the Royal Concertgebouw Orchestra, the New York Philharmonic, the Calouste Gulbenkian Foundation, the Barbican Centre, the Los Angeles Philharmonic, and the San Francisco Symphony. It was given its world premiere by Michael Tilson Thomas and the New World Symphony at the New World Center in Miami Beach on January 26, 2011.

== Composition ==
Polaris is composed in one continuous movement and has a duration of roughly 15 minutes. The work features an optional abstract video accompaniment created by Adès's then partner, the filmmaker and video artist Tal Rosner. The title of the piece refers to the star Polaris, also known as the Pole Star or North Star.

=== Instrumentation ===
The work is scored for an orchestra comprising three flutes (2nd doubling piccolo; 3rd doubling piccolo and alto flute), three oboes, three clarinets in A (3rd doubling bass clarinet), two bassoons, contraforte (or contrabassoon with low A), four horns (optional 8 horns), piccolo trumpet, three trumpets, three trombones, tuba, timpani, six percussionists, two harps, piano (doubling celesta), and strings.

== Reception ==
Polaris has been praised by music critics. Reviewing the West Coast premiere by Adès and the Los Angeles Philharmonic, Mark Swed of the Los Angeles Times wrote, "Adès' score is a friendly complication. Airy melodic lines in winds and strings and brass are incandescently lit by the high-wattage sparkle of piano, two harps, celeste, glockenspiel and plenty more percussion. Three times these lines dip into the glitter, and three times they emerge magnificent." Joshua Kosman of the San Francisco Chronicle later described Polaris as "an extravagantly beautiful and concise new orchestral score" and said it "left a listener enchanted by the work's eloquence and formal clarity, as well as its combination of historical echoes and utter novelty." The work was also praised by Georgia Rowe of the San Francisco Classical Voice, who called it "a major triumph" for Adès and said, "Despite its compact running time, the score, subtitled 'Voyage for Orchestra,' conjures an unmistakable sense of vastness."

Reviewing a performance by Alan Gilbert the New York Philharmonic, Anthony Tommasini of The New York Times observed, "Running through the score, like a loosely connecting thread, is an elusive melodic line that is presented in a series of canons with various instruments, including brass players stationed around the hall in the upper balconies." He added, "What came through in this hearing of the piece, played with vibrant colors and urgency, is the backdrop for the entwining melodic lines, which rustle along in churning, spiraling figures: a blur of busyness." Reviewing the same ensemble, George Hall of The Guardian said, "It was another demonstration of Adès's masterly orchestral writing, shimmering in the air as it moved steadily along its vast harmonic trajectory." Jeremy Eichler of The Boston Globe similarly remarked, "His piece builds up from a simple cycling pattern of notes in the piano that keeps evolving, suggesting not a loop but a massive spiral. The composer’s approach to the orchestra is as always brilliantly prismatic and here the music’s magnetic fields seem to expand, break apart, rearrange, and thrillingly clash."

== See also ==
- List of compositions by Thomas Adès
