= Julian Grant =

British composer

Julian Grant (born 3 October 1960) is an English-born classical composer best known for a series of operas. He is also known for chamber music works and his challenging children's music. He is active as composer, journalist, broadcaster and music educator.

== Biography ==
Julian Grant was born in London, England, and educated at Chichester High School for Boys and Bristol University. In 1985 he won a British Arts Council scholarship to attend the Music Theatre Studio Ensemble at Banff, Alberta, Canada. He returned to England in 1987 and freelanced for, among others, Northern Ballet Theatre, working closely with Christopher Gable on new performing versions of Prokofiev's Romeo and Juliet, and Tchaikovsky's Swan Lake, Chester Music, Novello's (a reduction of Thea Musgrave's Harriet Tubman, a Woman called Moses) and extensive education work with the London opera houses, notably English National Opera's Russian Tour in 1990.

In 1996 he moved with his partner Peter Lighte to Hong Kong, where they adopted two daughters. Grant held posts at Hong Kong University, guest conducted for the Academy of Performing Arts and hosted a weekday classical radio show. He lived in Japan from 2000 to 2002.

On return to London he became music director of St Paul's Girls' School, (2002–07) a post previously held by Gustav Holst, Ralph Vaughan Williams and Herbert Howells. During his tenure there he wrote pieces for the school, including a multi-media celebration of the school's centenary in 2004. He worked for the Birmingham and Scottish Operas (reductions of Beethoven's Fidelio and Tchaikovsky's Eugene Onegin), and wrote articles for the musical press, notably on opera and Russian music. From 2007 to 2010 he divided his time between Beijing and London, and was composer-in-residence at St. Ann's School, Brooklyn, from 2010 to 2012. In July 2012 his opera-ballet Hot House, a commission for London's Cultural Olympiad, premiered at the Royal Opera House, London. Since 2010 he lives in Princeton, NJ and New York.

His new chamber opera, with librettist Mark Campbell "The Nefarious, Immoral but Highly Profitable Enterprise of Mr. Burke & Mr. Hare" premiered at Boston Lyric Opera on 9 November 2017.

== Works ==
While at Banff, Grant produced several small-scale operas that culminated in The Skin Drum, which won the 1988 National Opera Association of America's biennial chamber opera competition, resulting in a semi-staged performance to launch the English National Opera's Contemporary Opera Studio in 1990. This led to a collaboration with Marina Warner, The Queen of Sheba's Legs (ENO Baylis) and to Out of Season (Royal Opera House Garden Venture, 1991 - nominated for an Olivier Award). Further works for the opera stage include A Family Affair, a version of an Alexander Ostrovsky play by Nick Dear (Almeida Theatre, 1993), Jump Into My Sack with Meredith Oakes (Mecklenbergh Opera 1996), Heroes Don’t Dance (Royal Opera), Platform 10 and Odd Numbers (Tête-à-Tête Opera), A Very Private Beach (English National Opera Knack 2004) and Shadowtracks (W11 opera, 2007) with regular collaborator Christina Jones. Odysseus Unwound (2006 ), also with Tête-à-Tête, involved traditional knitters, spinners and weavers from Fair Isle and Shetland, the conception of which was featured on BBC television's Culture Show.

He has also written chamber music, instrumental music, orchestral and vocal works, some of which feature his interest and knowledge of Asian music and culture.

== Operas ==
- Kings’ Children (libretto: Charles Causley - 1986)
- The Skin Drum (libretto: Mark Morris – 1987/8)
- Out of Season (libretto: James Mavor - 1991)
- The Queen of Sheba's Legs (libretto: Marina Warner - 1991) (children's opera)
- Anger (libretto: Meredith Oakes - 1993)
- A Family Affair (libretto: Nick Dear, after Alexander Ostrovsky – 1993)
- Serenade the Silkie (libretto: David Harsent – 1994)
- Jump Into My Sack (libretto: Meredith Oakes, after Italo Calvino – 1996)
- The Uninvited (libretto: Alastair Campbell – 1997) (children's opera)
- Heroes Don’t Dance (libretto: Christina Jones – 1998) (community opera)
- Platform 10, or The Power of Literature (libretto: Christina Jones – 1999)
- Odd Numbers (libretto: Christina Jones – 2001)
- A Very Private Beach (libretto: Christina Jones – 2004)
- Odysseus Unwound (libretto: Hattie Naylor, after Homer – 2006)
- Shadowtracks (libretto: Christina Jones – 2007) (children's opera)
- Only Connect (libretto: composer – 2010) (opera sketch)
- Prophet and Loss (libretto: composer – 2011)
- Original Features (libretto: Christina Jones – 2011) (children's opera)
- Hot House (libretto: Stephen Plaice – 2012) (opera-ballet)
- The Nefarious, Immoral But Highly Profitable Enterprise of Mr Burke & Mr Hare (libretto: Mark Campbell - 2017)
- Salt (libretto: composer, after Alexander Afanasyev – 2020)

== Orchestral, chamber and instrumental (selective) ==
- Sonata Notturna (1981)
- Six Reflections of ‘La Belle et la Bête’ (1985)
- Great Game (1995) – orchestra
- Tournament of Shadows (1995)
- Hex (1997)
- Analecta (1998)
- Off Course (1998)
- Shivereens (2000-9) - piano
- Dark Summer (2003) – string quartet
- Piano Trio (2003)
- Double Trouble (2006) - two pianos
- Three Island Tales for viola and piano (2006–2007)
- Strike Opponent's Ears With Both Fists (2008) ensemble
- Wu Dai Tong Tang (2009) piano/(2012) string orchestra
- Dances in the Dark (2013) - orchestra
- Sancho's Dance Mix (2014) - string orchestra
- 25 Preludes (2014) - piano
- Is It Enough? Perhaps It Is (2016) - orchestra
- Jump Cuts (2019) - small orchestra
- Suite for solo viola (2020)
- Scarlatti in Soweto (2021) string orchestra

== Vocal ==
- Despondent Nonsenses (Mervyn Peake – 1979)
- The Lady's Dressing Room (Jonathan Swift – 1984)
- Tre Poemi (Foscolo, Sacchetti, Petrarca – 1985)
- Three Songs for Angus (Michelangelo, Angolieri, Leopardi – 1993)
- Musings on Wisdom (Confucius – 1996)
- Moonstone Songs (Carmina Gadelica – 1998)
- The Owl and the Pussycat (Edward Lear – 1998)
- Out in the Cold (various – 2002)
- All in Tune (anon. carol – 2002)
- Small Tall Stories (anon. – 2003)
- Tillie's Allsorts (Christopher Reid – 2004)
- Tall Tales (anon. – 2007)
- Know Thy Kings and Queens (anon.- 2008)
- In a Fog - Remember (Anne Pierson Wiese – 2011)
- Three Ladies Beside the Sea (Rhoda Levine – 2018)

== Works for children ==
- Our Lady of the Chisels (1989) - cantata
- La befana (2002) – concert opera
- The Owl and the Pussycat (2003)
- The Prevailing Tree (2004)
- March: We Take the Golden Road (2005) – orchestra
- Time Piece (2006) - cantata
- A Little Lighte Music (2006) - piano
