= Tal Rosner =

Israeli filmmaker and video artist

Tal Rosner טל רוזנר
- Born: 9 June 1978 (age 48)
- Known for: Filmmaker, video artist
- Awards: BAFTA

Tal Rosner (Hebrew: טל רוזנר; born in Jerusalem, 9 June 1978) is a London-based Israeli filmmaker and video artist.

== Career ==
In May 2008, Rosner won a BAFTA for Best Title Sequence for the E4 teen drama Skins at the British Academy Television Craft Awards.

Since 2005, Rosner has collaborated with various musicians, including: Katia and Marielle Labeque, New World Symphony Orchestra and Michael Tilson Thomas, Esa-Pekka Salonen and Jennifer Koh. His video for In Seven Days, Piano Concerto with Moving Image, composed by Thomas Adès, was premiered by the London Sinfonietta at the Royal Festival Hall in London on 28 April 2008. The work was co-commissioned by the Southbank Centre and the Los Angeles Philharmonic.

His experimental film Without You (2008), commissioned by Animate Projects for Channel 4 and Arts Council England had earned Rosner screenings at film-festivals and venues worldwide, including Clermont-Ferrand, Rotterdam, Tribeca (NYC), Onedotzero and Tate Modern

In 2009, Rosner was commissioned by Sony London to create a short film of world first television moments to mark the launch of four Sony BRAVIA LCD TVs with World First innovations.

== Key works ==
- Polaris (2010, Composed by Thomas Adès)
- Lachen verlernt (2009, Composed by Esa-Pekka Salonen, Violin: Jennifer Koh)
- Without You (2008, for Animate Projects)
- In Seven Days (2008, composed by Thomas Adès)
- Skins/Title Sequences, series 1-6 (2007 - 2012)
- Stravinsky Concerto for Two Pianos (2006, for Katia and Marielle Labeque)
- Debussy En Blanc et Noir (2006, for Katia and Marielle Labeque playing En blanc et noir)
