= Cyndia Sieden =

American opera singer (born 1961)

Cyndia Sieden (born September 10, 1961) is an American coloratura soprano on the opera and concert stages.

== Biography ==
Cyndia Sieden was born in 1961 in California, USA, and received her first vocal instruction there. A significant early milestone in her studies was work with Elisabeth Schwarzkopf in master classes in Carmel Valley, California in 1982. Schwarzkopf then invited Sieden to become her private student, and also to work with her in her master classes at the 1983 Salzburg Mozarteum. Sieden sang in the culminating concert/competition and won first place, which became the catalyst for her first professional engagements. In 1984, she made her European debut in the Ruth Berghaus production of The Barber of Seville (Silvio Varviso conducting) at the Bavarian State Opera; her American debut also took place in 1984, in La Fille du Régiment in Tampa, Florida.

Since then, she has moved among the Baroque, classical, romantic and modern/contemporary repertoire at most of the world’s great opera houses, including Munich's Bavarian State Opera, Paris's Opéra Bastille, Barcelona's Gran Teatre del Liceu, La Monnaie in Brussels, and London’s Royal Opera House and English National Opera, as well as in Beijing and Australia. Her Metropolitan Opera, debut was in the title role of Alban Berg's Lulu, and she returned there in 2008 for the Queen of the Night in Die Zauberflöte. With a great sympathy for the works of Richard Strauss, she often performs Zerbinetta in Ariadne auf Naxos (Munich, Japan, Vienna), Sophie in Der Rosenkavalier (Paris Châtelet) and Aminta in Die schweigsame Frau (Palermo).

On the concert platform Cyndia Sieden has appeared with most major European and North American orchestras; Sieden often sings Carl Orff's Carmina Burana, the oratorios of Handel, Mozart, and Haydn, and works of Johann Sebastian Bach and Gustav Mahler. Among her collaborators have been Christoph Eschenbach, John Eliot Gardiner, Nikolaus Harnoncourt, James Levine, Nicholas McGegan, Roger Norrington, Wolfgang Sawallisch, Pinchas Steinberg and Esa-Pekka Salonen.

Challenging contemporary roles have been a hallmark of her career, including the high-flying and athletic role of Ariel in the premiere of Thomas Adès's The Tempest at the Royal Opera House Covent Garden. She repeated the role at the Frankfurt Opera in 2014. 2011 appearances in contemporary opera includes Morton Feldman's monodrama Neither for New York City Opera and Ariadne – Soprano I in Wolfgang Rihm's Dionysos at The Netherlands Opera.

Sieden divides her time between homes in Europe and the state of Washington, USA.

== Selected discography ==
- Mozart: Die Zauberflöte

Label: Archiv Produktion (DG) Composer: Wolfgang Amadeus Mozart Performers: Gardiner, Oelze, Schade, Sieden Conductor: John Eliot Gardiner Orchestra/Ensemble: English Baroque Soloists, Monteverdi Choir

- Mozart: Die Entführung aus dem Serail

Label: Archiv Produktion (DG) Composer: Wolfgang Amadeus Mozart Performers: Olsen, Orgonasova, Sieden, Peper Conductor: John Eliot Gardiner Orchestra/Ensemble: English Baroque Soloists, Monteverdi Choir

- Mozart: Arias For Aloysia Weber

Label: Glossa Composer: Wolfgang Amadeus Mozart Performer: Cyndia Sieden Conductor: Frans Brüggen Orchestra/Ensemble: Orchestra of the 18th Century

- Schweitzer: Alceste

Label: Berlin Classics Composer: Anton Schweitzer Performers: Hofstetter, Genz, Schneider, Sieden Conductor: Michael Hofstetter Orchestra/Ensemble: Concerto Cologne

- Mozart: Mitridate, re di Ponto

Label: Orfeo Composer: Wolfgang Amadeus Mozart Performers: Ford, Sieden, Oelze Conductor: Roger Norrington Orchestra/Ensemble: Camerata Salzburg

- Mozart: Der Schauspieldirektor

Label: Telarc Composer: Wolfgang Amadeus Mozart Performers: Pearlman, Aler, Sieden Conductor: Martin Pearlman Orchestra/Ensemble: Boston Baroque

- Gluck: Orfeo ed Euridice

Label: Philips Composer: Christoph W. Gluck Performers: Ragin, McNair, Sieden Conductor: John Eliot Gardiner Orchestra/Ensemble: English Baroque Soloists

- Strauss: Die Frau ohne Schatten

Label: EMI Angel Composer: Richard Strauss Performers: Kollo, Studer, Schwarz, Vinzing, Muff, Sieden Conductor: Wolfgang Sawallisch Orchestra: Symphonie-Orchester des Bayerischen Rundfunks

- Strauss: Die schweigsame Frau

Label: Koch Composer: Richard Strauss Performers: Kurt Moll, Van Der Walt, Sieden Conductor: Pinchas Steinberg Orchestra: Munich Radio Orchestra

== Sources ==
- NY Times Review, 3/2011
- Genz Việt Nam
- Washington Post review 3/27/2011
- Classical Review article 3/2011
- KDHX review of St. Louis Symphony concert, 5/6/2011
- Bach-Cantatas online bio
