= The Tempest (opera) =

Opera by Thomas Adès

- Opera by Thomas Adès
- Librettist: Meredith Oakes
- Language: English
- Based on: The Tempest by William Shakespeare
- Premiere: 10 February 2004; Royal Opera House, London

The Tempest is an opera by English composer Thomas Adès with a libretto in English by Meredith Oakes based on the play The Tempest by William Shakespeare.

== Background and premiere performances ==
Following the success of Powder Her Face, The Royal Opera, Covent Garden, commissioned a new opera from Adès in the late 1990s. Working with a librettist, a poetic version of the Jonestown Massacre of 1978 was prepared, but the composer found it impossible to set it to music. Finally, the libretto he needed emerged from a collaboration with Meredith Oakes.

The new opera became a co-production with the Copenhagen Opera House and the Opéra national du Rhin in Strasbourg. The Tempest received its world premiere to critical acclaim at the Royal Opera House in London on 10 February 2004. Other productions followed in Strasbourg and Copenhagen later in 2005 and the opera was given its US premiere staging by the Santa Fe Opera on 29 July 2006.

== Performance history ==
Covent Garden revived the opera in March 2007 with the same production team, Thomas Adès conducting, and many of the original London cast, including Simon Keenlyside, Cyndia Sieden, Ian Bostridge, Toby Spence, Philip Langridge, and Stephen Richardson repeating their original roles. Cyndia Sieden is the only member of the cast to sing her role, that of Ariel in all four previous productions. Amongst others new to the cast are soprano Kate Royal as Miranda and countertenor David Cordier as Trinculo.

As a co-production with the 2012 Québec City Opera Festival created by director Robert Lepage and the Vienna State Opera (June 2015), New York's Metropolitan Opera mounted a new production of The Tempest in the autumn of 2012 featuring Simon Keenlyside. It won the 2014 Grammy Award for Best Opera Recording. The 2012 Met production was streamed online on May 12, September 6 and December 7, 2020.

== Meredith Oakes' libretto ==
As for the words, you don't get Shakespeare's; but you get something that effectively suggests them at key moments, written by Meredith Oakes in rhyming couplets of impactful clarity. Neat and direct.

— Michael White's review of the 2004 Royal Opera House premiere in The Independent

The opera is a brilliant response to the play, rather than merely a setting of it. While entirely true to the spirit of Shakespeare's play, it is not contained by it. It is its own thing, and allows its own existence and resonance.

— Jonathan Kent, director of the 2006 Santa Fe Opera production

Looking for ideas for a new subject, Adès saw Jonathan Kent's staging of Shakespeare's The Tempest at the Almeida Theatre in London in 2000. For a new libretto, Adès turned to the experienced dramatist Meredith Oakes, whose work had included a short opera libretto for Miss Treat (2002); since the early 1990s, several original plays, translations and adaptations of classics and modern dramas; and, for television, the story line for Prime Suspect 4 (1995).

Rather than transfer Shakespeare's words directly into the libretto, Oakes has taken the approach of reducing much of the text to its essence, and she produces a compact libretto with the bulk of the text presented in the form of rhyming couplets. Many examples are given in the following plot synopsis, and they illustrate Oakes' technique but that does not always mean the complete removal of Shakespeare's text, as in the following example.

The result is that the original:

Full fathom five thy father lies
Of his bones are coral made;
Those are pearls that were his eyes

in the libretto becomes:

Five fathoms deep
Your father lies
Those are pearls
That were his eyes

=== Differences between the libretto and the play ===
The libretto is structured into three acts, approximately equal in length. As in Shakespeare's act 1, scenes 1 and 2, the five main characters are introduced. However, as the relationship between Miranda and Ferdinand progresses, the opera turns away from Shakespeare's presentation of Prospero as the benign manipulator of events, the controller of the pace of the young couple's growing love by using his trickery and magical powers.

In an aside to Ariel he comments:

They are both in either's pow'rs. But this swift business
I must uneasy make, lest too light winning
Make the prize light

and later, as his methods begin to take effect: "It works". The libretto suggests a more fatalistic acceptance by Prospero of the loss of his daughter to the young Prince. Therefore, whereas Shakespeare's act 1 concludes with Prospero urging on Ariel to further tasks which involve bringing the court to his part of the island, Oakes' libretto suggests a more vengeful Prospero:

I must punish him
And the rest as well
Bring me to them, Ariel.

Shakespeare's act 3, scene 2, in which Prospero accepts Ferdinand and Miranda's relationship, and later in act 4, scene 1, his:

for I
Have given you here a third of mine own life

contrasts sharply with the end of Oakes' act 2 in which Miranda and Ferdinand find each other again and declare their love, as they are watched over by Prospero, who frees Ferdinand but laments his loss of power in:

Miranda
I've lost her
I cannot rule their minds
My child has conquered me
A stronger power than mine
Has set the young man free.

Oakes' act 2 features action taking place on the stage in the presence of entire court rather than in separate scenes as in Shakespeare's act 2.

== Thomas Adès' music ==
Much has appeared in print about the striking music composed for this opera. Ranging from the almost dissonant (parts of act 1) to the sublimely lyrical (the Miranda–Ferdinand love duet, rare in modern operas, and a quintet passacaglia in act 3), with surges and outpourings of emotion contrasting with harmonic clashes of tone and color, The Tempest is regarded as the composer's towering achievement to date. This is reflected in the following writers' statements:

The evening deservedly belongs to Adès, who himself conducts a score as orchestrally lush and evocative as vocally varied and articulate. The cumulative effect is by turns ethereal, witty, incandescent, often ravishing.

— Andrew Clements, Review of the 2004 Royal Opera House premiere

... For one composer at least, contemporary lyric opera is still a viable medium. It looks like an opera and it behaves like an opera, offering a musical drama in which the traditional operatic virtues of musically delineated characterisation and musically satisfactory dramatic pacing are wonderfully sustained.
The musical action of the opera is continuous but is divided into a sequence of sharply distinct scenes. The techniques of pitch derivation found in earlier Adès scores are used again, so that instead of providing his characters with a set of musical identity cards there is a fluid, evolutionary system of characterisation in which vocal manner and accompaniment style are more important than leitmotifs. Qualities of place and status are as important as individual personalities, so the island is represented by evenly flowing accompaniments in woodwind and strings, while the world of the Milan court is represented by more declamatory writing in which the brass are often evident.

— Christopher Fox, The Musical Times, London, [northern] Autumn 2004.

== Roles ==
Roles, voice types, premiere casts at the UK and US premieres
Role	Voice type	World premiere 10 February 2004 Royal Opera House Conductor: Thomas Adès	American premiere 29 July 2006 Santa Fe Opera Conductor: Alan Gilbert
Miranda, Prospero's daughter	mezzo-soprano	Christine Rice	Patricia Risley
Prospero, rightful Duke of Milan	baritone	Sir Simon Keenlyside	Rod Gilfry
Ariel, a spirit	coloratura soprano	Cyndia Sieden	Cyndia Sieden
Caliban, a savage	tenor	Ian Bostridge	William Ferguson
Ferdinand, son of King Alonso	tenor	Toby Spence	Toby Spence
Stefano, a drunken butler	bass-baritone	Stephen Richardson	Wilbur Pauley
Trinculo, a jester	countertenor	Lawrence Zazzo	David Hansen
Antonio, Prospero's brother	tenor	John Daszak	Derek Taylor
Sebastian, King Alonso's brother	baritone	Christopher Maltman	Keith Phares
Gonzalo, an honest councilor	bass-baritone	Gwynne Howell	Gwynne Howell
Alonso, King of Naples	tenor	Philip Langridge	Chris Merritt
Chorus: Guests of King Alonso

== Synopsis ==
Quotations below come from the published libretto by Meredith Oakes.

=== Act 1 ===
Scene 1: The court

Using his magical powers, Prospero has created a huge storm during which the ship carrying his brother Antonio (who has usurped his position as Duke of Milan) along with King Alonso, Duke of Naples, Alonso's son Ferdinand, and their courts is wrecked. Offstage the court is heard.

Scene 2: Miranda and Prospero

Miranda is horrified at the destruction which her father has caused, but Prospero explains how his brother usurped his position and how they were cast away on a small boat twelve years before, surviving with only the help of a faithful courtier, Gonzalo. Prospero sends Miranda to sleep.

Scene 3: Ariel and Prospero

Ariel explains that she has carried out Prospero's orders, and he further instructs her to restore the shipwrecked group with "Not a hair perished/ On their clothes no blemish". "I'll clean them and dry them/ And set them on the island" she obeys.

Scene 4: Caliban and Prospero (Miranda asleep)

Caliban appears and immediately questions why Prospero has caused such distress. Prospero dismisses him – "Abhorrent slave/ Go to your cave" – as he recalls Ariel.

Scene 5: Prospero and Ariel (Miranda asleep)

Ariel tells Prospero that she has obeyed his commands. He then orders her to bring the King's son, Ferdinand, to this part of the island. While loyal to Prospero, Ariel questions when she will be freed from his service and she is assured that after twelve years, this will happen. The pair then hides, leaving Miranda sleeping on the beach.

Scene 6: Ferdinand and Miranda (with Prospero and Ariel unseen)

Ferdinand arrives on the island to find Miranda asleep. At first he thinks that she is a spirit and, as she wakes up, she wonders who he is: "I never saw/ Your like before". They are immediately attracted to each other, but Prospero appears, confronts Ferdinand, tells him of Alonso's deeds, and immobilizes the young man. Ferdinand declares his love for Miranda and accepts anything which Prospero will do to him, but Prospero declares him unworthy of Miranda and then orders Ariel to bring Alonso and his party to him.

=== Act 2 ===
Scene 1: The King, and the court on the island. (Prospero and Ariel are unseen)

The chorus is amazed at how they come through the storm and shipwreck so unscathed. From his hidden vantage point, Prospero orders Ariel to "Taunt them, haunt them/ Goad and tease/ Prick them, trick them/ Give them no peace". The king laments the loss of his son and Gonzalo attempts to comfort him, but Ariel's trickery begins and, impersonating the voices of the group to confuse them and divide them, they begin to squabble. Conflict is avoided by the arrival of Caliban.

Scene 2: Caliban with the court

They confront each other in amazement and soon Trincolo and Stefano begin to ply Caliban with drink. As Ariel's trickery continues, he assures the group not to be afraid, that "the island's full of noises" and explains his presence there, but, before he can reveal Prospero's name, he is silenced and leaves the group. Confused, the King and Gonzalo leave to search the island with Prospero working his magic to send them to "search/ Where there's no path/ Go in circles/ Drink the salt marsh".

Scene 3: Caliban, Stefano, and Trincolo

Briefly, they plot to restore Caliban to his former position as head of the island.

Scene 4: Ferdinand, Miranda, (and Prospero unseen)

The couple expresses their love for each other and Miranda frees Ferdinand leaving Prospero to accept the loss of his daughter: "Miranda/ I've lost her/ I cannot rule their minds/ My child has conquered me/ A stronger power than mine/ Has set the young man free".

=== Act 3 ===
Scene 1: Caliban, Trincolo, and Stefano all drunk

The trio cavorts across the island proclaiming the coming moment when Stefano will be King of the island and Caliban will be free.

Scene 2: Prospero and Ariel, followed by the arrival of the court

Ariel explains that she has led the court around the island and, once more, asks to be freed. The King and the court arrive exhausted and ready to collapse; quickly all but Antonio and Sebastian fall asleep. The two begin to plot to kill the King but are interrupted by the unseen Ariel's plea to the sleepers to wake up. Creating a banquet out of thin air, she just as quickly causes it to disappear and then leads the group away into further confusion. Prospero comments on his power over his enemies.

Scene 3: Miranda and Ferdinand, return to Prospero

The couple tells Prospero that they are married and Ariel arrives with her good wishes in addition to telling the young man that his father is actually alive. As he causes Ariel to vanish, Prospero announces that he is ending the magic: "Our revels are ended/ Why do you stare?/ He's melted into air/ So cities will perish/ Palaces vanish/ The globe itself/ Dissolve/ Nothing stay/ All will fade". Caliban, Trincolo and Stefano return, the former re-affirming his lust for Miranda with whom "We'll have Calibans/ Many and strong". In disgust, Prospero makes them disappear, Ariel re-appears and is promised her freedom within an hour.

Scene 4: Everyone except Caliban

Prospero reveals himself to the King and his court, and reveals Ferdinand and Miranda to Alonso. With the re-appearance of Stefano and Trincolo the court is joyously reunited; "Bless this isle/ Where Prospero found his dukedom/ Ferdinand his bride/ And Naples Ferdinand" says Gonzalo as all make their way to their restored ship. Prospero makes his peace with the King, forgives his brother, and breaks his staff as Ariel departs. Her voice is heard offstage.

Scene 5: Caliban alone, with Ariel offstage

Caliban stands alone on the island musing on the changes: "Who was here/ Have they disappeared?". Ariel's voice is heard off stage.

== Recordings ==
- The BBC broadcast The Tempest on 23 June 2007 from the Covent Garden revival and a commercial recording featuring Bostridge, Keenlyside, Sieden and Royal was released by EMI Classics in June 2009.
- The Metropolitan Opera production from 2012, conducted by Adès, was issued on DVD by Deutsche Grammophon. Prospero: Simon Keenlyside; Ariel: Audrey Luna; Caliban: Alan Oke; Miranda: Isabel Leonard; Ferdinand: Alek Shrader; King of Naples: William Burden; Antonio: Toby Spence; Stefano: Kevin Burdette; Trinculo: Iestyn Davies; Sebastian: Christopher Feigum; Gonzalo: John Del Carlo. The production was by Robert Lepage. Winner of the 2014 Grammy Award for Best Opera Recording.

== Critical reactions to UK and US premieres ==
London premiere production reviews, 2004:

- Anthony Holden, "A truly prosperous Prospero", The Observer, London, 15 February 2004
- Michael White, "The Tempest, Royal Opera House, London: A triumph for Britain's brightest and best", The Independent, London, 11 February 2004
- "The Tempest triumphs". The Guardian, leader, 12 February 2004.

American premiere production reviews, 2006:

- Hugh Canning, "Music: Brits lead the way in Santa Fe", The Sunday Times, London, 13 August, 2006
- David Patrick Stearns, "In Santa Fe, bold new 'Tempest ... Shakespeare's play became a trenchant commentary on dictatorship and racism", The Philadelphia Inquirer, 6 August 2006
- James R. Oestreich, "Santa Fe Opera Offers Love on a Stormy Island", The New York Times, August 5, 2006
- J.A. Van Sant, "Strong Tempest at Santa Fe". Opera Today (blog), 31 July 2006.

London revival production reviews, 2007:

- Erica Jeal, "The Tempest". The Guardian, 14 March 2007.
- Edward Seckerson, "The Tempest, Royal Opera House, London". The Independent, 14 March 2007.
- Rupert Christiansen, "The Tempest is still magic". Telegraph, 14 March 2007.

The opera was listed as the fifth greatest classical composition of the 21st century in a 2019 poll by The Guardian.
