= Living Toys =

Chamber music composition by Thomas Adès

Living Toys, Op. 9, is a composition for chamber ensemble by the English composer Thomas Adès. It was written in 1993 as a part of his MPhil portfolio in Composition at Cambridge University and premiered at the Barbican Hall in London under Oliver Knussen.

== Instrumentation ==
The work is scored for a chamber ensemble of 14 players, which consists of: flute (doubling piccolo), oboe (doubling cor anglais and sopranino recorder), clarinet (doubling E♭ clarinet and bass clarinet), bassoon (doubling contrabassoon), French horn (doubling whip), trumpet (doubling piccolo trumpet), trombone, percussion, piano, violin I & II, viola, cello and double bass. Adès uses a wide variety of extended techniques, such as the double bass player and pianist hitting the backs of their instruments.

== Structure ==
The work is divided into five main sections, with three additional parts whose names are anagrams of each other. A poem by Adès is inscribed in the score, albeit allegedly "translated from the Spanish". Imagery from the poem relates to sections of the work in both titles and musical material.

1. Angels

The opening of the piece involves a horn solo over which glittering, ethereal figures are played on high woodwinds, gongs and string harmonics.

2. Aurochs

Inspired by a now-extinct bull of humongous size. The Aurochs was a cattle native to Europe, Asia, and North Africa. This section of the piece evokes a bullfight, with members of the ensemble (including the conductor) clapping along to frantic castanets which accompany bass clarinet, bassoon, trombone, cello and bass.

BALETT

A long, smooth melody unwinds over more shimmering accompaniment. BALETT ends with a tutti B natural.

3. Militiamen

This section is mainly a soli for the piccolo trumpet and percussion. The trumpet plays a carefully calculated jazz-inspired solo whilst the rest of the ensemble provide big-band interjections. The music builds and ends with a short tutti figure. The oboe has a short, sharp rising figure which pushes the music forward to the next part.

4. H.A.L.'s Death

In the film 2001: A Space Odyssey, the on-board computer was referred to as 'Hal'. Near the end of the film when Hal is deactivated, he is heard to be singing the song "Daisy Bell". Here, Adès replays the song using the contrabassoon, double bass and other low-sounding instruments over sustained chords. The quote is incredibly well-disguised, and features a prominent solo for the Sopranino Recorder.

BATTLE

Fast, technical passagework for every player and frequent time changes create a frenzied atmosphere.

5. Playing Funerals

A climax of the piece, where all the music before it degenerates into complete dissonance. The music unwinds and settles into a slow tempo, where subtle changes of timbre and register transform the colour of the music.

TABLET

This is the concluding section of the composition. It consists of haunting chords played in the strings and winds, with the gongs from earlier creating a lifeless sound. The piece finishes with 3 final splashes of colour, before the horn and violin fade into nothing.

== Recordings ==
London Sinfonietta with Markus Stenz: (From Amazon.com)
