= In Seven Days =

Piano concerto composed by Thomas Adès

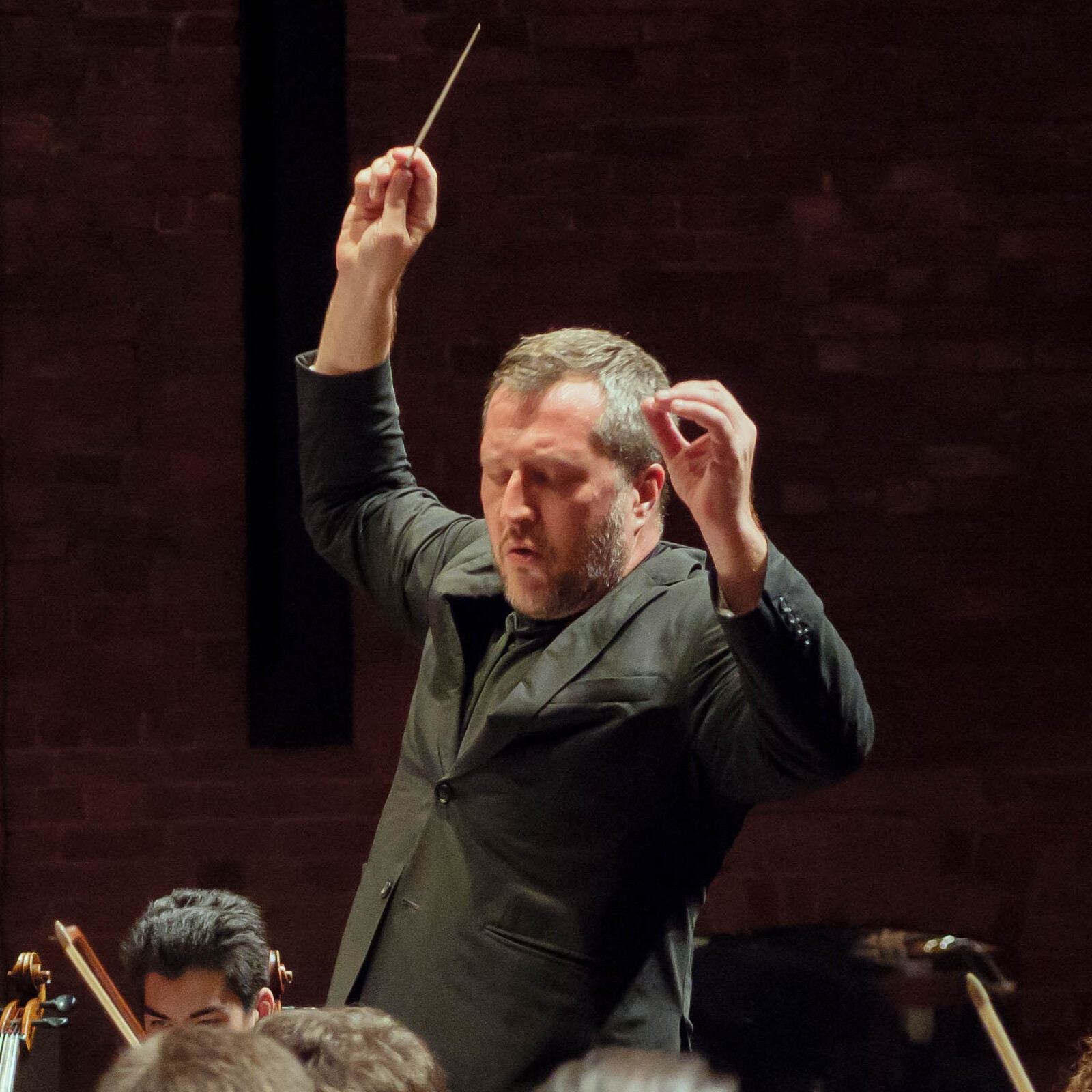
Thomas Adès conducting the National Youth Orchestra of Great Britain in 2017

In Seven Days: Concerto for Piano with Moving Image is a piano concerto by the British composer Thomas Adès. The work was commissioned by the Southbank Centre and the Los Angeles Philharmonic. It was given its world premiere by the pianist Nicolas Hodges and London Sinfonietta under Adès at the Royal Festival Hall on April 28, 2008. An optional video accompaniment was created for performance with the piece by Adès's then partner Tal Rosner.

== Music ==
In Seven Days has a duration of roughly 28 minutes and is composed in seven movements:

1. Chaos – Light – Dark
2. Separation of the waters into sea and sky
3. Land – Grass – Trees
4. Stars – Sun – Moon
5. Fugue – Creatures of the Sea and Sky
6. Fugue – Creatures of the Land
7. Contemplation

The movements musically recount each of the seven days of the Biblical creation narrative as detailed in the Book of Genesis.

The work is scored for solo piano and a large orchestra comprising three flutes (2nd doubling alto flute and piccolo; 3rd doubling piccolo), three oboes, three clarinets, three bassoons (3rd doubling contrabassoon), four horns, three trumpets, two trombones, bass trombone, tuba, timpani, four percussionists, and strings.

== Reception ==
In Seven Days has been praised by music critics. Reviewing the United States premiere, Mark Swed of the Los Angeles Times wrote, "Full of the life of our own times yet so rooted in the past that it feels like family, Ades' music operates on so many different parts of the brain at once that it overpowers critical faculties. Brightly bopping scores tickle the pleasure centers. Ingenious counterpoint stimulates the logic-leaning synapses of the left brain. Musical fantasy and illogic mess with the right brain. By this point, who has a enough gray matter left for anything else?" He added, "In Seven Days occupies a more mature space than the earlier works. But the freshness has not grown stale." Anthony Tommasini of The New York Times called the piece "terrific" and observed, "As the creation saga unfolds, the music is at once reverent and playful. Galumphing basses and low brass evoke the creatures of the land, while twittering flutes and crazed piccolo announce the creatures of the sky. Long episodes evolve in arcs of brilliant piano writing where restless, filigreed, spiraling figures cascade down the keyboard." He added:

Even when the music heaves on the surface, the inner textures and voices are a riot of activity. It has long been hard to pigeonhole Mr. Adès's musical language, and so it was with this piece. For music of such audacious modernism, the overall sound was wondrously strange and somehow elemental. Hints of ancient modal harmony combine with jazzy chords and fractured rhythms. In the final section, 'Contemplation,' the theme is presented straightforwardly as the music slowly disperses into silence, to suggest touchingly that the work of creation is done. Now what?

George Hall of The Guardian opined, "Adès possesses the gift of producing striking and immediate ideas that are nevertheless subtly ambiguous in their impact. Here, the Copland-like simplicity of the opening gestures forms a platform for successive processes of variation, development and contrast that eventually return to their starting point." Joshua Kosman of the San Francisco Chronicle called it "a vividly evocative musical-visual creation" and wrote, "Thursday's performance by the San Francisco Symphony [...] came as yet another demonstration of the sheer breadth and grandeur of Adès' creative gift. In Seven Days is both dramatic and reflective, by turns ingratiatingly accessible and dauntingly abstruse. It seems to want to embrace the whole world — a fitting goal for the creation story — and yet it remains winningly approachable." The music was similarly praised by Andy Gill of The Independent, Ivan Hewett of The Daily Telegraph, and Richard Whitehouse of Gramophone.

Conversely, Niels Swinkels of the San Francisco Classical Voice criticized the piece, remarking, "Unfortunately, all I heard was one banal idea morphing into the next, vague references to symphonic rock or to movie soundtracks, endless, rippling motion up and down unimaginative scale progressions..." He added, "It is perfectly possible that Adès's reputation has influenced my expectations too far, and I will certainly explore his music further. But that will be in spite of what I experienced on Saturday evening and not because of it."

== Recording ==
A recording of In Seven Days performed by Hodges and the London Sinfonietta was released through Signum records on January 31, 2012.
