= Frédéric Durieux =

French composer

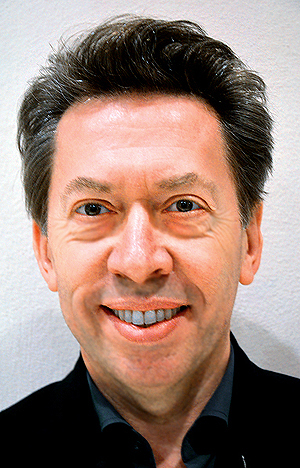
Frédéric Durieux, 2016

Frédéric Durieux (born 27 February 1959, Paris) is a French composer of orchestral, vocal, and chamber works. He is a professor of composition at the Paris Conservatoire National Supérieur.
