= Dave Muller =

American contemporary artist (born 1964)

Dave Muller (born 1964) is an American contemporary artist whose paintings and installations explore human connection, community, and shared cultural histories through music consumption. Drawing on his experience as a DJ and record collector, Muller creates large-format acrylic paintings that examine music, its subcultures, and how the accumulation of cultural references in contemporary music shapes individual and collective identity. He also directs and curates Three Day Weekend, a series of nomadic exhibitions presented internationally.

== Early life and education ==
Dave Muller was born in San Francisco in 1964 and grew up in Novato, California, where he played sports, studied chemistry, and collected records. He attended the University of California, Davis (UC Davis), where he continued his chemistry studies and served as a DJ and Music Director at KDVS. While at UC Davis, his interest in art was sparked when he took an elective drawing class with visiting artist Scott Bell and added art to his major, earning a Bachelor of Arts and Science (BAS) in 1989. He later briefly moved to New York to study art at the School of Visual Arts but returned to California to attend the California Institute of the Arts (CalArts) in Valencia and earn a Master of Fine Arts (MFA) in 1993.

== Artistic practice ==
Dave Muller's lifelong interest in music and later art underpins his object-based work of large-scale acrylic paintings of stacked vinyl album spines, cassettes, CDs, promotional stamps, radio station copies, or labels marked "NOT FOR SALE," juxtaposing rock legends like Led Zeppelin and Nirvana with obscure B-sides extinct local record-store labels, and the physical items of music culture, such as disco balls or the drum kits of individual bands. Muller’s work examines how American pop culture, through commercial pop music, serves as a democratic, equalizing force that builds collective dialogue and a network of social relationships across American life. Muller also draws on the culture of listening to and sharing music rather than working in isolation as a studio artist; as a DJ at various events and parties, he saw how this practice shaped social connections and public gatherings, and he incorporated that into his work. Initially, he promoted his own curated art and music events with handmade flyers. He later made them for fellow artists and their shows, which evolved into his ongoing project, Three Day Weekend, a series of nomadic exhibitions he organizes and promotes that extend his work beyond the gallery wall.

=== DYI flyers ===
Invitation to Three-Day Weekend at Blum Poe, 2015.

In the 1990s, Los Angeles saw a surge of upstart galleries that took risks on raw, local talent from the latest generation of art-school graduates (from schools like UCLA, CalArts, and ArtCenter) that mainstream galleries had traditionally overlooked. Upon graduating from CalArts, Muller began making hand-drawn posters and placing them in and around other galleries to promote the shows by his artist friends from the aforementioned demographics. This new LA art scene mirrored the indie-rock music scene of bands and record labels Muller knew well, and he used the same grassroots promotional approach: DIY, amateur flyers favored by start-up indie-rock bands and their fans to promote concerts. Muller deliberately eschewed slick digital printing in favor of idiosyncratic, personal, unevenly washed watercolor and acrylic drawings to publicize his artist friends' events. Rather than merely copying a gallery's official press release, Muller treated the exhibition announcement as a conceptual filter, shaping the event through his own humor, perspective, and aesthetic.

=== Nomadic exhibitions ===
During his graduate studies at CalArts, Muller began inviting other students to exhibit their work in his on-campus studio. After graduating in 1994, he moved into a loft in Downtown Los Angeles (DTLA), where he continued inviting other artists to exhibit in his DTLA studio and hosted an opening party with drinks and music. Muller began organizing more of these events over holidays and long weekends, and called them Three Day Weekend. While traveling with artist Mike Kelly as his assistant, Muller hosted Three Day Weekend events internationally, in cities including London, Berlin, Vienna, Tokyo, and Athens, and personally hand-carried the artworks onto airplanes. He presented the work of Los Angeles artists and the local artists he met during his stay. As his own artistic career progressed, Muller continued to incorporate the Three Day Weekend project as an extra element to the various exhibitions and visiting artist residencies he was invited to. Muller has called Three Day Weekend an "artist-run, nomadic project" and described the concept of a gallery as adaptable to nearly any setting, including unconventional spaces such as a freight elevator, as demonstrated at the Frankfurt Art Fair in 2000.

=== Music portraits ===
Rob’s Top Eleven Speculative Alternate, 86 1/2 × 38 1/2, acrylic on paper, 2016.

Muller’s ongoing series, Top Tens, began in 2004 and invites friends and acquaintances to list ten LP records they listened to, along with the circumstances of their listening experiences. Reflecting the concept "You Are What You Listen To," Muller creates detailed acrylic and watercolor paintings that serve as surrogate portraits for each individual. His titles reference each subject's personal context, such as Jeff’s Top Ten (for the last month I was single), Anne’s Top Fourteen, and Matthew’s Top Ten (1979–83). The paintings meticulously depict the physical wear of actual records, including cracked cardboard edges on album sleeve spines, and are depicted stacked and leaning against an implied shelf. Muller arranges the records visually, prioritizing color, texture, and harmony over chronological or alphabetical order, similar to a floral arrangement. Frequently, the paintings are rendered at the actual height of the person represented. The project has since expanded to encompass additional themes, including "celebrity top tens," custom commissions, and notable figures such as Barack Obama, as well as depictions of books, cassettes, and CDs.

=== Installation art ===
Muller’s large-scale installations and environments use murals he paints directly on the walls of various venues as a contextual backdrop for other artworks he hangs above them. Often, he adds sound recordings to the spaces he creates. Concerning the process and how he arrives at a finished environmental space, Muller states, “Laying this whole thing out is a little bit like DJ-ing a show. You start using the images and thinking about how they might work with the other images, like putting a bunch of records together to get you somewhere. You know, to go from one place to another.” In the work titled Old Growth, exhibited at Blum & Poe in 2004, Muller painted a horizon line across the gallery walls, framing a musical and geological landscape chart that featured squat palm trees and stylized grass. Using a timeline as the subject, Muller chronicled the evolution of rock n' roll since 1955 in a 2008 mural he titled As Below, So Above. Painting it in the lobby of the Institute of Contemporary Art in Boston. In 2013, Muller created a 29-foot site-specific mural on the wall of the then-new Elk Camp restaurant at Snowmass Ski Area where he asked 86 Aspen Skiing Co. employees to list their favorite albums. Muller then translated the musical survey data into a topographical landscape, with the most popular albums as mountain peaks and the least favorite as valleys. In 2017, at the Minneapolis Institute of Art (Mia), Muller was asked to recontextualize works in the collection in an expansive art installation. Muller used a blue sky background for his mural as the "mental glue" to unify the diverse historical and contemporary objects he had chosen for the multiple rooms of the show titled Now Where Were We? Of Us and Art in the contemporary section of the Mia.

==== Pop-up record store ====
Record Pavilion 2.0, 2022 / 2026 at the Untitled Art Fair, Houston.

In spring 2017, Muller created P&B Records, a pop-up record store at The Meow, an art exhibition space in a backyard shed at the home of artists Lisa Anne Auerbach and Joel Kyack, located in Mt. Washington, Los Angeles. He later installed it in solo exhibitions. At his 2022 solo show at Blum & Poe gallery in Los Angeles, he built a booth within the gallery. He called it The Record Pavilion, offering records from his own collection for sale at the price he had originally paid. In 2026, he reinstalled Record Pavilion 2.0 as part of the "Special Projects" sector at the Untitled Art Fair in Houston, then presented it at his solo exhibition at ArtCenter.

== Museum exhibitions ==
- 1995, Santa Monica Museum of Art: solo exhibition Tree of Life.
- 2001, Saint Louis Art Museum: solo exhibition highlighting his work.
- 2002, Bard Center for Curatorial Studies / Hessel Museum of Art: solo exhibition in Annandale-on-Hudson, New York.
- 2003, Hammer Museum: solo exhibition organized by Bard Center for Curatorial Studies.
- 2004, San Francisco Museum of Modern Art (SFMOMA): Featured in the museum's reintroduced New Work series.
- 2008, Institute of Contemporary Art (ICA), Boston: Hosted a major solo exhibition of his work.
- 2008, Museo de Arte Contemporáneo de Castilla y León (MUSAC), Spain: Exhibited a solo show.
- 2016-2017, Minneapolis Institute of Art (Mia): solo presentation.
- 2026, Alyce de Roulet Williamson Gallery at ArtCenter College of Design: Showcased a major survey solo exhibition titled Dave Muller: Proto Typical, covering more than two decades of his music-and-culture-inspired multimedia works.

== Public collections ==
- Dallas Museum of Art
- Hammer Museum (Los Angeles, California)
- Henry Art Gallery (Seattle, Washington)
- Museum of Contemporary Art, Los Angeles
- Museum of Modern Art (New York, New York)
- National Gallery of Canada (Ottawa, Ontario)
- San Francisco Museum of Modern Art
- Solomon R. Guggenheim Museum (New York, New York)
- Whitney Museum of American Art (New York, New York)
- Nasher Museum of Art at Duke University (Durham, North Carolina)
