= Meredith Oakes =

Australian playwright (born 1946)

- Born: September 18, 1946 (age 78)
- Education: Cheltenham Girls High School; University of Sydney
- Spouse: Tom Sutcliffe
- Children: Walter Sutcliffe

Meredith Oakes (born 18 Sept 1946) is an Australian playwright who has lived in London since 1970. She has written plays, adaptations, translations, opera texts and poems, and taught play-writing at Royal Holloway College and for the Arvon Foundation. She also wrote music criticism before leaving Australia for The Daily Telegraph in Sydney, and from 1988 to 1991 for The Independent, as well as contributing to a variety of magazines including The Listener.

== Life ==
Meredith Oakes is a seventh-generation Australian who was educated at Cheltenham Girls High School, Sydney from 1959 to 1963, and then at the University of Sydney where she took double honours in French and Music. She studied violin with Gordon Bennett of the Sydney String Quartet and piano as a second instrument. In London, she initially worked for the magazine Music and Musicians as an editorial assistant and writer, and later was public relations officer for Allied Artists Agency from 1972 to 1973 when they were presenting the London Music Digest, a series of contemporary concerts at the Round House.

She is married to the opera critic Tom Sutcliffe. Their son, Walter Sutcliffe, is a theatre and opera director.

== Career ==
Her first performed play was The Neighbour for the Royal National Theatre in 1993. Other plays have included The Editing Process (1994), Faith (1997), and Scenes from the Back of Beyond (2006) at the Royal Court Theatre, Mind the Gap (1995) at Hampstead Theatre, Man for Hire (2002) at the Stephen Joseph Theatre in Scarborough, and Shadowmouth (2006) at the Crucible Studio in Sheffield. Her most recent plays were a trio of shorts, The Fisherman, Short Lease and SATB, written for actor-musician students at Rose Bruford College and staged at Battersea Arts Centre in June 2007. A volume of Collected Plays was published by Oberon Books in 2010, containing two radio plays Glide and The Mind of the Meeting, and five stage plays The Neighbour, The Editing Process, Faith, Her Mother and Bartok, and Shadowmouth.

Oakes wrote the libretto for The Tempest based on Shakespeare's play with music written by the English composer Thomas Adès. Her text, except for a few distant echoes of familiar Shakespearian phrases, is original. The opera was given its premiere performance on 10 February 2004 at the Royal Opera House, Covent Garden. It has subsequently been staged at the Opéra National du Rhin in Strasbourg, at the Royal Theatre in Copenhagen, in a new production by Jonathan Kent in summer 2006 in Santa Fe, and in two separate productions in Germany in January and March 2010 - at the Frankfurt Opera, staged by Keith Warner and at Theater Lübeck staged by Reto Nickler. A production of the opera by Robert Lepage at the New York Metropolitan Opera premiered in 2013.

Oakes wrote the text for the television opera The Triumph of Beauty and Deceit (1995) by the Irish composer Gerald Barry, commissioned by Channel Four. In the summer of 2002 this was staged in a production by director/designer Nigel Lowery for Almeida Opera, at the Aldeburgh Festival and in London, and also performed in the autumn at the Berlin Festwochen. Other opera texts she has written include Miss Treat for Des Oliver, staged by Tête à Tête in 2000, Jump into My Sack (based on a story by Italo Calvino) for Julian Grant, staged by Mecklenburg Opera in 1996, and Solid Assets for Colin Huehns, staged by the English National Opera studio in 1993. Her cycle of poems, Edward John Eyre, was written to be set to music by the Australian composer Barry Conyngham in 1970.

Both The Neighbour and Faith have been staged in the US, the former in Los Angeles, and the latter off-Broadway in New York. Oakes's plays are mostly published by Oberon Books. The text of The Tempest is published by Faber Music. Her radio plays have included Glide (1998, with incidental music by Gerald Barry), Trampoline (2000), The Mind of the Meeting (2002), and Alex Tripped on my Fairy (2009), all for BBC Radio 3. She also translated the French Algerian playwright Fatima Gallaire's Pebbles for Your Thirst (Des Cailloux pour la Soif, Radio 4, 2002). For television she originated the story of Prime Suspect 4: Inner Circles (1995).

Oakes has also written adaptations of some classic works such as Thomas Middleton's The Revenger's Tragedy presented at the Southwark Playhouse, London in 2006. Her new version of Mozart's Der Schauspieldirektor (The Impresario) was staged by Garsington Opera in 1995.

Her translation of Werner Schwab's modern classic Die Präsidentinnen was staged in the West End in a production by Richard Jones at the Ambassadors Theatre in 1999, with the title Holy Mothers. She translated Fatima Gallaire's Princesses for the Royal Court Theatre. Other translations of classic and modern plays have included Thomas Bernhard's Elizabeth II and Jakob Lenz's The New Menoza, both staged at the Gate Theatre in the early 1990s by David Fielding, and Strindberg's Miss Julie staged at the Young Vic. She collaborated with Andrea Tierney on a translation of Bernhard's Heldenplatz which was staged at the Arcola Theatre in February 2010. Her translations from German also include Schiller's Kabale und Liebe (under the English title Luise Miller), Ödön von Horváth's Italian Night, Thomas Bernhard's Heldenplatz, and two contemporary plays, Moritz Rinke's The Man Who Never Yet Saw Woman’s Nakedness, and Christoph Nußbaumeder's To the South Seas by Gherkin-plane.

Her dramaturgical work included Stephen Daldry's only opera staging to date (Manon Lescaut at the Gaiety Theatre in Dublin, 1991), and advising on his production of von Horváth's Judgment Day at the Old Red Lion, Islington in 1989 (qv: Wendy Lesser A Director Calls page 39)). Her collaboration with Daldry when he was directing her play The Editing Process in 1994 at the Royal Court is a major focus of Lesser's book. Oakes also worked as dramaturg on opera productions by Tim Coleman in Dublin and Belfast, and with Tim Hopkins on Forest Murmurs for Opera North in Leeds.

== Sources ==
- Lesser, W (1997). "A Director Calls", Faber & Faber.
