= Chris Harman (composer) =

Canadian composer

Chris Paul Harman
- Born: 1970 (age 55–56); Toronto, Ontario, Canada
- Occupation: Canadian composer of contemporary classical music

Chris Paul Harman (born 19 November 1970) is a Canadian composer of contemporary classical music.

He grew up in Toronto, attending Maurice Cody Public School, then North Toronto Collegiate Institute. He is currently a Professor of music composition at McGill University.

== Awards ==
- Finalist, CBC Radio National Competition for Young Composers (1986 - the youngest finalist ever)
- Winner for "Iridescence", CBC Radio National Competition for Young Composers (1990 - youngest composer ever awarded the Grand Prize)
- First prize in the under-30 category for Iridescence, International Rostrum of Composers in Paris, France (1991 - first Canadian)

== See also ==
- List of Canadian composers
