= Gloria Cheng =

American pianist

Gloria Cheng is an American pianist who won a Grammy Award for her 2008 Piano Music of Esa-Pekka Salonen, Steven Stucky, and Witold Lutosławski and a nomination for The Edge of Light: Messiaen/Saariaho. Her film, Montage: Great Film Composers and the Piano (2016), documenting the recording of the eponymous CD (Harmonia Mundi USA) of works composed for her by Bruce Broughton, Don Davis, Alexandre Desplat, Michael Giacchino, Randy Newman, and John Williams, aired on PBS SoCal and was awarded the 2018 Los Angeles Area Emmy for Independent Programming. She is a member of the faculty at UCLA. She served as 2012 Regents Lecturer at the University of California, Berkeley.

== Education ==
She holds a B.A. in economics from Stanford University and graduate degrees in music from the University of California, Los Angeles (UCLA), and the University of Southern California (USC). She also studied piano in Paris and Barcelona, and her primary teachers were Isabelle Sant'Ambrogio, Aube Tzerko, and John Perry.

== Career ==
Cheng is widely recognized as an eloquent performer of contemporary music. The Washington Post has called her "one of the most adventurous interpreters of contemporary music around." She has played at the Ojai Festival, Chicago Humanities Festival, the William Kapell Festival, the Mendocino Music Festival, and the Tanglewood Festival of Contemporary Music, and has commissioned, premiered, and been the dedicatee of many works by an international roster of composers. Cheng has been a soloist with the Los Angeles Philharmonic under Zubin Mehta and Pierre Boulez and on its Green Umbrella series under Esa-Pekka Salonen and Oliver Knussen.
