= Thomas Adès =

British musician (born 1971)

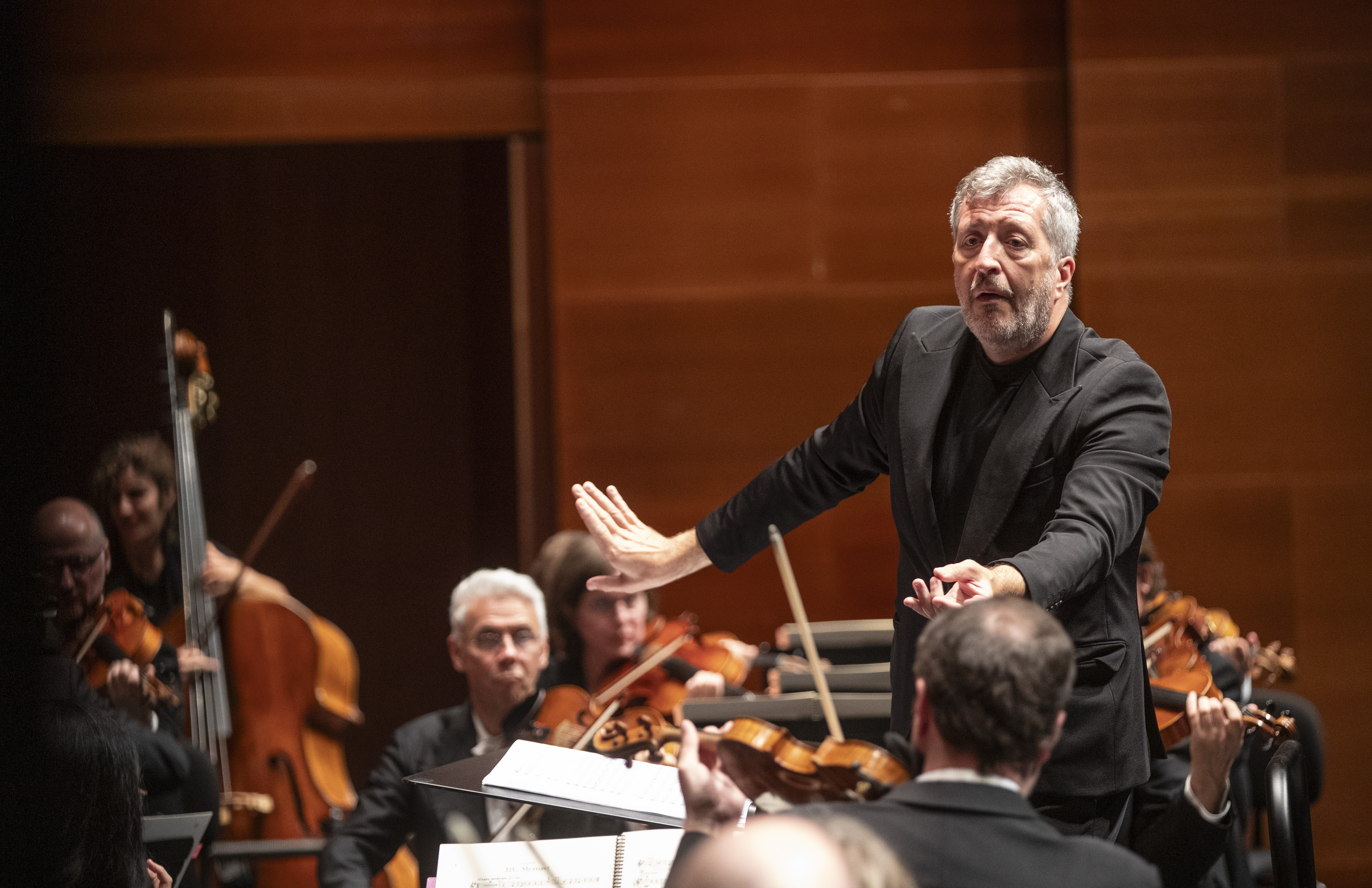
Adès conducting the Orchestre de l'Opéra national de Paris (2025)

Thomas Joseph Edmund Adès CBE (born 1 March 1971) is a British composer, pianist and conductor. Five compositions by Adès received votes in the 2017 Classic Voice poll of the greatest works of art music since 2000: The Tempest (2004), Violin Concerto (2005), Tevot (2007), In Seven Days (2008), and Polaris (2010). Major recent works include: Dante (2020) and Aquifer (2024).

== Biography ==
Adès was born in London to art historian Dawn Adès and poet Timothy Adès. His surname is of Syrian Jewish origin. Adès is gay and identified his sexuality closely with the Russian composer Pyotr Ilyich Tchaikovsky in his youth.

Adès studied piano with Paul Berkowitz and later composition with Robert Saxton at Guildhall School of Music and Drama, London. After attending University College School, he achieved a double starred first in 1992 at King's College, Cambridge, studying with Alexander Goehr and Robin Holloway. He was appointed Britten Professor of Composition in the Royal Academy of Music and in 2004 was awarded an honorary doctorate by the University of Essex.

In 2007, a retrospective festival of Adès's work was presented at the Barbican Arts Centre in London and he was the focus of Radio France's annual contemporary music festival, "Présences", and Helsinki's "Musica Nova" festival. The Barbican festival, "Traced Overhead: The Musical World of Thomas Adès", included the UK premiere of a new work for Simon Rattle and the Berlin Philharmonic, Tevot. Journalist Tom Service wrote of the piece, "Of any piece of new music I've heard at its premiere, this is one of the most immediately, richly powerful." In the spring of 2007, The Tempest returned to the Royal Opera House.

In 2009, Adès was the focus of Stockholm Concert Hall's annual Composer Festival, and in 2010 he was made a foreign member of the Royal Swedish Academy of Music. Five years later he was elected to the Board of Directors of the European Academy of Music Theatre. For 2022 Adès was awarded the BBVA Foundation Frontiers of Knowledge Award in Music and Opera. He won an Ivor Novello Award in 2023: his composition Növények, for mezzo-soprano and piano sextet, won for Best Chamber Ensemble Composition. In September 2024 Adès was presented with the Royal Philharmonic Society's Gold Medal by Simon Rattle at the BBC Proms.

== Compositions ==
=== Orchestral ===
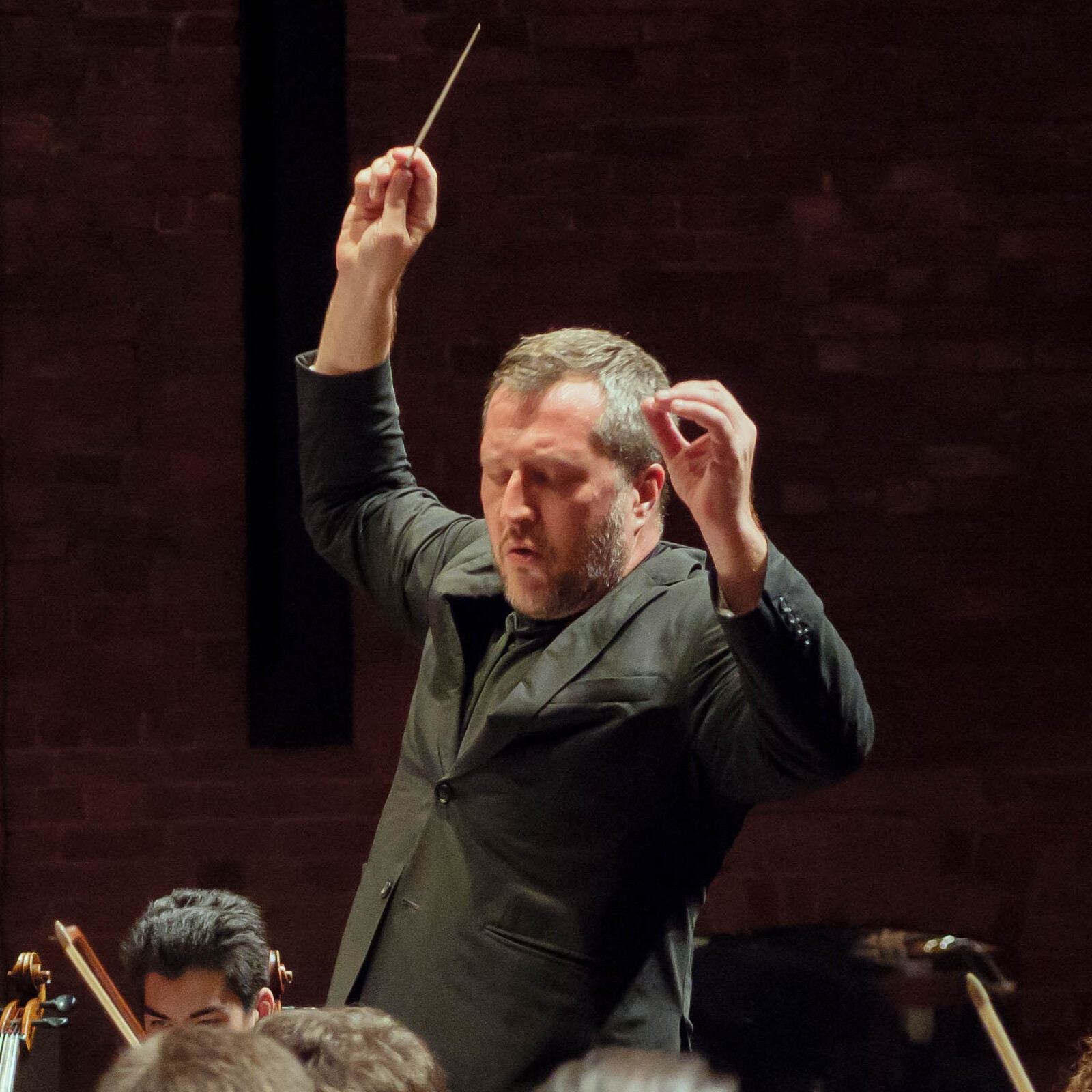
Thomas Adès conducting the National Youth Orchestra of Great Britain in 2017

Asyla
for orchestra, commissioned for the City of Birmingham Symphony Orchestra (CBSO) by the John Feeney Charitable Trust, was premiered in Symphony Hall, Birmingham in October 1997 by Simon Rattle and the CBSO. It received its London premiere at the BBC Proms on 15 August 1999 by the BBC Symphony Orchestra, conducted by the Composer. This work received the University of Louisville Grawemeyer Award for Music Composition in 2000, making Adès the youngest ever to receive the award.
On 7 September 2002, Simon Rattle gave his first concert as principal conductor of the Berlin Philharmonic Orchestra with Asyla and Gustav Mahler's Symphony No. 5, both of which have also been released on CD and DVD by EMI.
Asyla has since been performed across the world, including on a recent tour of the Far East by Rattle and the Berlin Philharmonic.
America: A Prophecy
commissioned for the New York Philharmonic Orchestra's Millennium Messages in November 1999 and it received its UK premiere at the Aldeburgh Festival in June 2000. A recording of the work is available on EMI Classics (2004).
Concentric Paths
Adès's violin concerto received its premiere in September 2005 with a performance by the Chamber Orchestra of Europe with Anthony Marwood as soloist, which received critical acclaim.
Tevot
for orchestra, was premiered in Berlin by Simon Rattle and the Berlin Philharmonic on 21 February 2007, and received its American premiere as part of the Berlin in Lights Festival at Carnegie Hall.
In Seven Days
for piano, orchestra, with video installation, was premiered by the London Sinfonietta, conducted by Adès at Royal Festival Hall in London on 28 April 2008. Video segment was created by Tal Rosner, Adès's then partner. The work was co-commissioned by the South Bank Centre and the Los Angeles Philharmonic.
Polaris
for orchestra and five video screens (moving images by Tal Rosner), was written for the opening of Frank Gehry's New World Arts Center in Miami, Florida, and premiered by the New World Symphony Orchestra under Michael Tilson Thomas on 26 January 2011. The work was co-commissioned by the New World Symphony Orchestra with the Calouste Gulbenkian Foundation, the Royal Concertgebouw Orchestra, the New York Philharmonic, the Los Angeles Philharmonic, the San Francisco Symphony and the Barbican Centre, London.
Totentanz
for mezzo-soprano, baritone, and large orchestra, commissioned by Robin Boyle and dedicated to Witold Lutosławski and his wife Danuta, was premiered on 7 July 2013 by the BBC Symphony Orchestra as part of that year's BBC Proms.
Concerto for Piano and Orchestra
for piano and large orchestra, commissioned by the Boston Symphony Orchestra and premiered by the BSO and the pianist Kirill Gerstein in Symphony Hall, Boston, on 7 March 2019.
The Exterminating Angel Symphony
a four movement orchestral rendering of music from the opera, premiered on 4 August 2021 at the Symphony Hall, Birmingham, by the City of Birmingham Symphony Orchestra, conducted by Mirga Gražinytė-Tyla.
Air – Homage to Sibelius
for violin and orchestra, commissioned by Roche for the Lucerne Festival and premiered on 27 August 2022 at the Kultur- und Kongresszentrum Luzern (KKL) by Anne-Sophie Mutter and the Lucerne Festival Contemporary Orchestra, conducted by Adès. The work received its UK premiere on 30 May 2024 when it was performed by the London Symphony Orchestra and conducted by Adès himself.

=== Operas ===
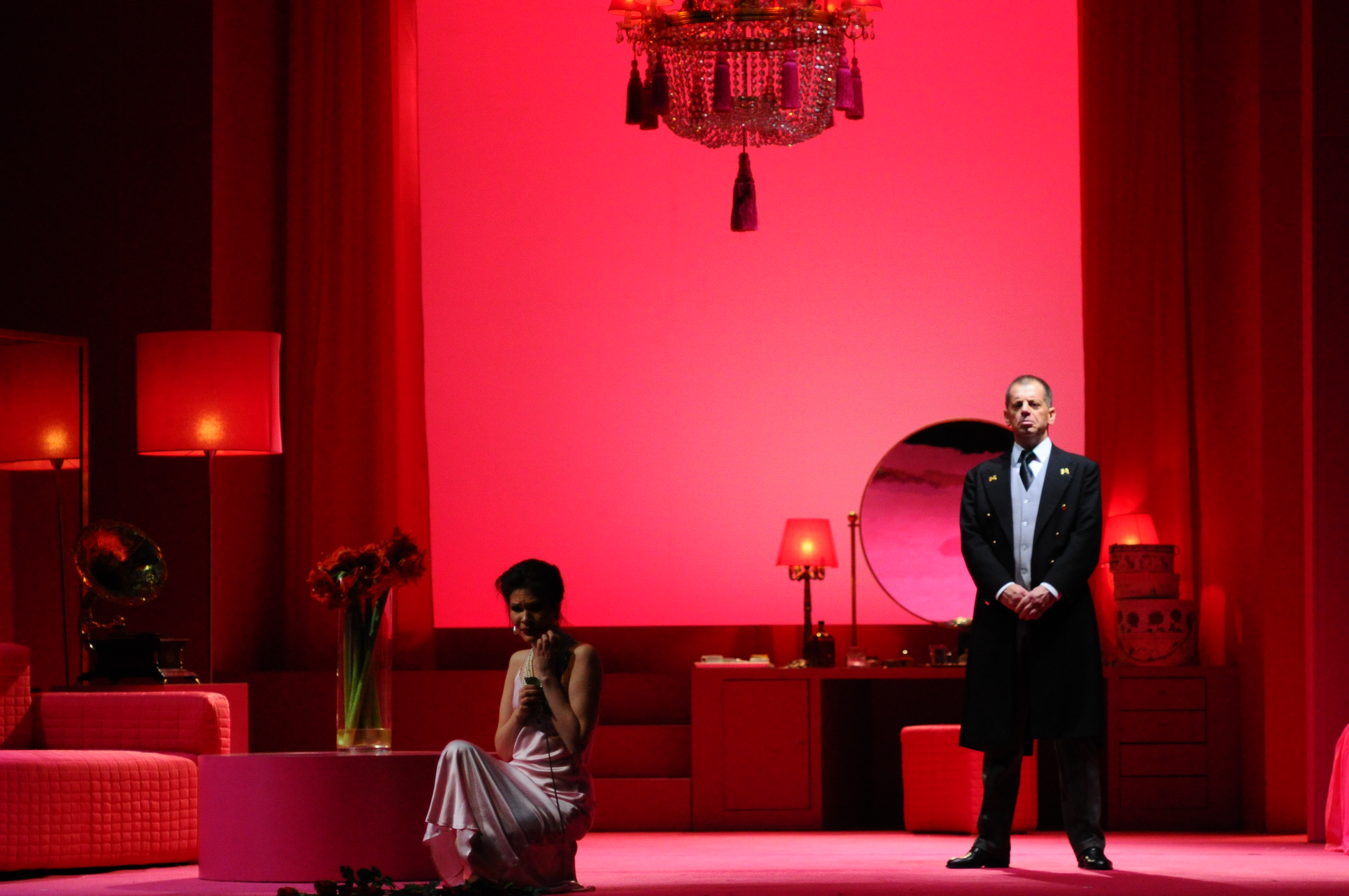
A scene from a production of Powder Her Face by Pier Luigi Pizzi at the Teatro Comunale Bologna, 2010

Powder Her Face
Adès's 1995 chamber opera with a libretto by Philip Hensher, won both good reviews and notoriety for its musical depiction of fellatio. The opera was commissioned by Almeida Opera Festival, London, and has since been given new productions around the world. The Duchess depicted in the opera is the Margaret Campbell, Duchess of Argyll whose scandalous behaviour in Britain in the early 1960s was revealed during a divorce trial with the introduction into evidence of photographs of her various sexual acts. Adès's "Concert Paraphrase" on Powder Her Face for solo piano was premiered by the composer for the Vancouver Recital Society on 14 March 2010 in Vancouver; the work was co-commissioned by the VRS, San Francisco Performances, and the Barbican Centre in London.
The Tempest
with a libretto by Meredith Oakes adapted from Shakespeare's play, was premiered to critical acclaim at the Royal Opera House, Covent Garden London in February 2004, followed by performances at the Strasbourg Opera and the Copenhagen Opera House in 2005. Its US premiere was by the Santa Fe Opera in July 2006. The original production was revived by the Royal Opera House London in March 2007 to acclaim. A production by Frankfurt Opera, staged by Keith Warner and conducted by Johannes Debus in January 2010 was the first in Germany. EMI's recording of the Covent Garden performance of The Tempest won Adès the title of Composer of the Year in the 2010 Classical BRIT Awards. The Metropolitan Opera, New York, included The Tempest in its 2012–13 season, conducted by Adès and produced by Robert Lepage. The same production was seen in Vienna in the summer of 2015.
The Exterminating Angel
adapted from Luis Buñuel's 1962 surrealist film El ángel exterminador, was premiered at the 2016 Salzburg Festival, and performed at the Royal Opera House, Covent Garden, Metropolitan Opera, New York and Royal Danish Opera, Copenhagen, the four co-commissioners and co-producers of the opera.

=== Choral music ===
The Fayrfax Carol
a cappella choral composition. Written originally for King's College, Cambridge, 1997, the piece has been recorded by ensembles such as the BBC Singers and also the City of Birmingham Symphony Chorus. The work received its U.S. West Coast premiere by International Orange Chorale of San Francisco.

=== Chamber music ===
Five Eliot Landscapes
Adès's first opus, published in 1990.
Arcadiana
a seven-movement, 20-minute string quartet (Op. 12), was recorded in 1998 along with other work from the 1993 to 1994 period.
Cardiac Arrest
a work for chamber ensemble of 7 players. The piece is based on song by Madness. It received its premiere at Meltdown, Purcell Room, London in 1995 by Composers Ensemble.
Catch
a chamber work for clarinet, piano, violin and violincello. It premiered in 1993 at St George's, Brandon Hill, Bristol by Lynsey Marsh, Anthony Marwood, Louise Hopkins and Thomas Adès.
Chamber Symphony
a work for 15 players, Chamber Symphony lasts approximately 13 minutes and was given its first performance at the Cambridge Festival of Contemporary Music, West Road Concert Hall, Cambridge by Contemporary Music Festival Ensemble under the baton of Thomas Adès in 1991.
Concerto Conciso
a work for piano and chamber ensemble (10 players). The piece was given its premiere at the Adrian Boult Hall, Birmingham by the Birmingham Contemporary Music Group under Thomas Adès in 1997.
Court Studies
this chamber work for clarinet, violin, cello and piano lasts approximately 8 minutes and was given its premiere in 2005 at the Jubilee Hall, Aldeburgh Festival by the Composers Ensemble.
Four Quarters
this string quartet was commissioned by the Carnegie Hall Corporation, and, was premiered in 2011 at Stern Auditorium, Carnegie Hall, New York by the Emerson String Quartet.
Les baricades mistérieuses
for clarinet, bass clarinet, viola, cello and double bass. Written for Wilfred Mellers's 80th birthday, it was first performed at Dartington International Summer School's Great Hall by The Composers Ensemble in 1994.
Lieux retrouvés
for cello and piano. Co-commissioned by the Aldeburgh Festival, Wigmore Hall and Carnegie Hall. First performed at Aldeburgh Festival, Snape Maltings Concert Hall, Suffolk by Steven Isserlis and Thomas Adès in 2009; 2016 BBC Proms UK premiere of version for orchestra
Life Story
a work for soprano and chamber ensemble of 3 players, Life Story is set to Tennessee Williams's text. It was written for The Composers Ensemble and received its first performance in 1993 at West Road Concert Hall, Cambridge University.
Living Toys
for chamber ensemble of 14 players. The work was commissioned by the Arts Council of Great Britain for the London Sinfonietta. Conducted by Oliver Knussen, the work was premièred in 1994 at the Barbican Hall, London.
The Origin of the Harp
a chamber ensemble work for 10 players was commissioned by the Halle Orchestra. It began life in 1994 at the Free Trade Hall in Manchester under the baton of the composer himself.
Piano Quintet
premièred at the 2001 Melbourne Festival, Australia by Thomas Adès (piano) and the Arditti Quartet. Recording of the work with Adès at the piano and the Arditti Quartet (released in 2005 by EMI with Schubert's Trout Quintet – with Adès and the Belcea Quartet).

== Other musical activities ==
=== Pianist ===
In 1993, at age 22, Adès gave his first public piano recital in London as part of the Park Lane Group series of recitals.

Adès was a runner-up in the BBC's Young Musician of the Year competition in 1990. EMI has released a CD of Adès as a solo performer, "Thomas Adès: Piano", and several CDs as an accompanist, frequently with Ian Bostridge, Steven Isserlis and others. As a student Adès was a percussionist, at one point playing percussion in Stravinsky's "Les noces" under Sir Simon Rattle.

=== Musical director ===
Adès was the first music director of the Birmingham Contemporary Music Group from 1998 to 2000.

He served as artistic director of the Aldeburgh Festival from 1999 to 2008, succeeded in 2009 by the pianist Pierre-Laurent Aimard.

In 2000, he was composer-in-residence of the Ojai Festival in California (along with Mark-Anthony Turnage), under the artistic direction of Ernest Fleischmann. While there, performances included:

- The U.S. West Coast premiere of Asyla, with Sir Simon Rattle conducting the Los Angeles Philharmonic
- Darkness Visible and Still Sorrowing performed by pianist Gloria Cheng
- These Premises are Alarmed conducted by Rattle with the Los Angeles Philharmonic

He was resident with the Los Angeles Philharmonic during their 2005/6 and 2006/7 seasons as part of the orchestra's "On Location" series at Walt Disney Concert Hall and other locations.

Adès is the Deborah and Philip Edmundson artistic partner with the Boston Symphony Orchestra, a position he has held for three years, 2018/2019, 2019/2020, and 2020/2021. The position was created specifically for him.

== Recordings ==
DVD

- Powder Her Face was made into a film by Channel 4 and shown on Christmas Day 1999 in the UK. The film was released on DVD in the UK for Christmas 2005, including a documentary film about Adès made by Gerald Fox in 1999. It is also available in the US.
- Asyla (along with Mahler's 5th Symphony) formed Sir Simon Rattle's opening concert as Music Director with the Berlin Philharmonic. The two concerts given were recorded and released as a DVD in 2002.
- "The Tempest": the Metropolitan Opera production from 2012, conducted by Adès, was issued on DG. Prospero: Simon Keenlyside; Ariel: Audrey Luna; Caliban: Alan Oke; Miranda: Isabel Leonard; Ferdinand: Alek Shrader; King of Naples: William Burden; Antonio: Toby Spence; Stefano: Kevin Burdette; Trinculo: Iestyn Davies; Sebastian: Christopher Feigum; Gonzalo: John Del Carlo. The production was by Robert Lepage. Winner of the 2014 Grammy Award for Best Opera Recording.

Audio CD

as composer

- Life Story (1997)
- Living Toys (1998)
- Asyla (1999)
- Powder Her Face (1999)
- America (2004)
- Adès/Schubert: Piano Quintets (2005)
- Violin Concerto (2007), download release.
- The Tempest (2009)
- Tevot, Violin Concerto, Three Studies from Couperin, Dances from Powder Her Face (2010)
- Thomas Adès: Anthology (2011) including Concert Paraphrase on Powder Her Face and Three Mazurkas
- In Seven Days (Signum Classics, Nicholas Hodges, Rolf Hind, Thomas Adès, 2011)
- Polaris (2012), download release.
- Lieux retrouvés (Hyperion, Steven Isserlis, Thomas Adès, 2012)
- Thomas Adès Dante (Nonesuch, Los Angeles Philharmonic, Gustavo Dudamel, 2023)

as performer

- Cello World (with Steven Isserlis) (1998)
- Thomas Adès: Piano (2000)
- Janáček: The Diary of One Who Disappeared (with Ian Bostridge) (2002)
- The Music of Poul Ruders, vol.4 (2004)
- Stravinsky: Complete Music for Violin and Piano (Hyperion, Thomas Adès/Anthony Marwood, 2010)
