= Paul Carey Jones =

Welsh opera singer (born 1974)

Paul Carey Jones (born 11 March 1974) is a Welsh-Irish bass-baritone opera singer.

== Early life and education ==
Jones was born in Cardiff, to a Welsh father (from Carmarthenshire) and an Irish mother (from County Mayo), and is a dual-nationality citizen of the United Kingdom and Republic of Ireland. He attended the Welsh-medium schools Ysgol Gymraeg Melin Gruffydd (primary school, ages 4–11) and Ysgol Gyfun Gymraeg Glantaf (secondary school, ages 11–18), and remains a fluent Welsh speaker. He then studied Physics at The Queen's College, Oxford University, where he was awarded a Styring Exhibition in 1993, but "became increasingly aware that the course of the rest of my life was going to diverge from Physics". After completing a PGCE teacher training course at the University of Wales Institute, Cardiff, he then returned to Ysgol Glantaf to teach Physics for two years, before resigning in 1998 to study singing at the Royal Academy of Music and then the National Opera Studio in London, supported by Welsh National Opera. He appeared in the first round of University Challenge as team captain for the Royal Academy of Music, in 1999.

== Career ==
Jones has appeared as a principal guest artist several times for Scottish Opera and Northern Ireland Opera, as well as for the Royal Opera, The Icelandic Opera, Welsh National Opera, Teatro Comunale di Bologna, Teatro Comunale Bolzano, Teatro Rossini, at the Wexford Festival, Buxton Festival, for Opera Holland Park, Longborough Festival Opera, Opera East, Bampton Classical Opera, Diva Opera, and Lyric Opera Dublin.

=== Wagnerian roles ===
Jones was joint winner of the 2013 Wagner Society Singing Competition, and has since performed several of Richard Wagner's heldenbariton roles. He appeared for Longborough Festival Opera as Wotan in Die Walküre (2021) and Siegfried (2022), and is due to reprise the role in their full cycle of Der Ring des Nibelungen in 2024, in a production directed by Amy Lane and conducted by Anthony Negus.

=== Contemporary music ===
Jones has given world premiere performances of works by the composers Stephen McNeff (the oratorio Cities of Dreams in 2007; the role of Elisha in the opera The Burning Boy in 2017; and the role of Y Bon Pebr in the opera 2117 / Hedd Wyn in 2022); Stuart MacRae (his Prometheus Symphony at the 2019 Lammermuir Festival); Conor Mitchell (the title role in The Musician, Belfast 2021), John Metcalf (the roles of Dancing Williams, Sinbad Sailors, Willy Nilly, Mr Pugh, Mr Pritchard and Mr Floyd in Under Milk Wood: An Opera, Metcalf's adaptation of Dylan Thomas' play for voices); Peter Wiegold (his short opera based on the movie Brief Encounter in 2004); Jonathan Owen Clark (his opera Hidden States in Newcastle in 2004); Richard Elfyn Jones (his oratorio In David's Land at St David's Cathedral in 2006, and his set of songs Four Poems of Gerard Manley Hopkins in 2008); Jonathan Dove (his opera for television, Man on the Moon, in 2006); Keith Burstein (playing the role of Mohammed in the opera Manifest Destiny at the 2005 Edinburgh Festival Fringe); David Power (his set Forever and Other Songs); Emily Hall (four settings of words by Toby Litt at the 2010 Grimsby St Hugh's Festival); Sadie Harrison (Heartoutbursts); and Timothy Raymond (From Dark to Dark). For Northern Ireland Opera in 2012 he created the roles of the Policeman in Ed Bennett's Jackie's Taxi, the Father in Christopher Norby's The Girl Who Knew She Could Fly and the Father in Brian Irvine's May Contain Flash Photography.

His work in contemporary opera has also included the role of Blazes in Peter Maxwell Davies' The Lighthouse at the Cantiere Internazionale d'Arte di Montepulciano, Sam in Leonard Bernstein's Trouble in Tahiti for Second Movement, Andy Warhol in the Italian premiere of Michael Daugherty's Jackie O at the Teatro Rossini in Lugo and the Teatro Comunale di Bologna, The Priest in the Scottish premiere of The Trial by Philip Glass and Pacheco in the world premiere of the revised version of Ines de Castro by James MacMillan, both for Scottish Opera, and The Colonel in the Icelandic premiere of Daniel Bjarnason's Brothers for The Icelandic Opera.

=== Collaboration with Oliver Mears ===
Jones works regularly with the director Oliver Mears. Their collaborations include Scarpia (Tosca), Verdi's Macbeth, Father (Hansel and Gretel) and Noye (Noye's Fludde) for Northern Ireland Opera; Scarpia (Tosca) and Speaker (The Magic Flute) for Nevill Holt Opera; and Sam (Trouble in Tahiti) and Monsieur Juste (The Three Wishes) for Second Movement.

=== Collaboration with Llŷr Williams ===
As a member of Yehudi Menuhin's Live Music Now! scheme he gave over 200 concerts, mainly in partnership with the pianist Llŷr Williams, with whom he continues to collaborate; their debut album of classical songs, titled Enaid – Songs of the Soul, was released in November 2007 by Sain.

In November 2008 they premiered a set of songs, Four Poems of Gerard Manley Hopkins, written specifically for them by the composer Richard Elfyn Jones, in a recital at Cardiff University, and in August 2011 they appeared at an evening recital at the Machynlleth Festival, giving their first performance of Schubert's Winterreise.

== Recordings ==
Jones' debut album of classical songs, titled Enaid – Songs of the Soul, was released in November 2007 by Sain., with the pianist Llŷr Williams. A track from the album was included on Sain's 2009 compilation album, The Welsh Gold Collection.

His second solo album, Songs Now, of songs by contemporary British composers, was released in August 2012 by Meridian Records, with the pianist Ian Ryan. His third solo album, of songs by Clara Schumann and Rhian Samuel, with soprano Katharine Dain and pianist Jocelyn Freeman, was released in 2019 by Ty Cerdd Records under the title Song Lied Cân.

Jones sings the roles of Squire Allworthy and Dobbin on Naxos' recording of Edward German's Tom Jones, released in August 2009. He appears in various roles, including Dancing Williams, Sinbad Sailors and Mr Pugh, on the original cast recording of John Metcalf's Under Milk Wood: An Opera, released by Ty Cerdd in 2014, and in Stephen McNeff's 2117 / Hedd Wyn as Y Bon Pebr, also from Ty Cerdd in 2022, with a libretto by Gruff Rhys.

On DVD, Jones appears as Andy Warhol on Dynamic's 2009 recording of Michael Daugherty's Jackie O, and in various roles on the BBC's 2005 film of Rachel Portman's The Little Prince.

A recording by Jones of Puccini's aria Questo Amor was used on the soundtrack of San Banarje's multi-award-winning 2010 film Bodhisattva.

== Writing ==
Jones publishes a long-running blog under the title Ranitidine & Tonic. His regular posts on the response of the classical music industry to the COVID-19 pandemic were published in late 2020 in paperback, hardback, Kindle and audiobook editions (the latter narrated by the author) under the title Giving It Away: Classical Music in Lockdown and other fairytales.

== Campaigning Work ==
Since 2021 Jones has been a member of the steering group of the voluntary campaigning organisation Freelancers Make Theatre Work, being particularly active on the impact of Brexit on the performing arts industry in the UK.
