= NI Opera =

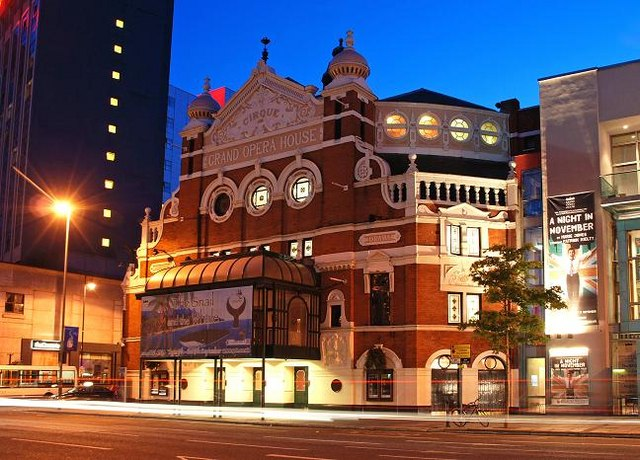
Grand Opera House, Belfast

Northern Ireland Opera is Northern Ireland's national opera company.

The company is based at the Carnegie Building, Donegall Road, Belfast, and its major funder is the Arts Council of Northern Ireland. The company's patron is Sean Rafferty, and its artistic director is Cameron Menzies.

== History ==
=== Origins ===
Northern Ireland Opera (originally "Opera Company NI") was founded in 2010 after a strategic decision by the Arts Council of Northern Ireland to "incorporate the best resources from Castleward Opera and Opera Fringe" into a single new company. The Arts Council appointed former board member of Castleward Opera, Roy Bailie OBE as chairman, and former chairman of Opera Fringe Michael Coburn as vice-chairman.

=== Inaugural Season ===
In the following months Oliver Mears was appointed artistic director by the board, and the new company officially launched its inaugural season of events in December 2010, collaborating with Barry Douglas and his Camerata Ireland orchestra in a Christmas concert at the Ulster Hall. In February 2011 it co-produced its first NI-wide tour, with Second Movement Opera, a production of The Medium by Gian Carlo Menotti which travelled throughout Northern Ireland.

== Seasons 2011–present ==
=== 2011–2012 season ===
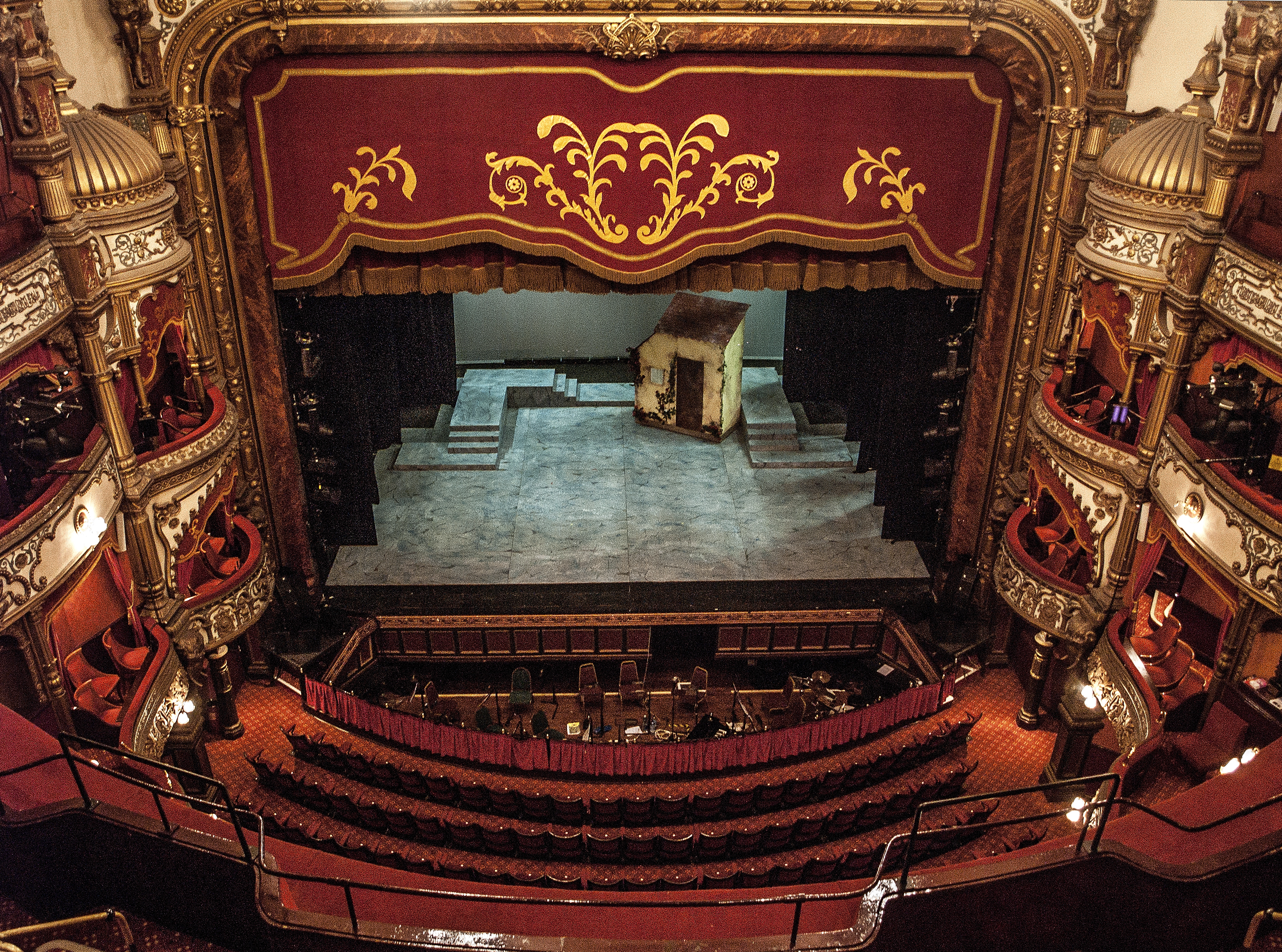
Interior of the Grand Opera House main stage and orchestra pit prior to its major refurbishment in 2020/2021

The company's first major production was Giacomo Puccini's Tosca, in three different historic spaces in Derry in March 2011, featuring Giselle Allen in the title role, with Jesús León as Cavaradossi and Paul Carey Jones as Scarpia. The production won the Irish Times Theatre Award for best opera in February 2012.

In his review of the company's first production, Tosca in March 2011, where he notes the enthusiastic response of the first night audience Terry Blain continues by stating that:

[i]n a part of the United Kingdom where opera has suffered constantly over the years from chronic inattention and lack of proper funding, and for long periods has seemed simply an irrelevance, Mears and his team have shown at a stroke that there is hunger for the art-form in an area where historically there has been no coherent or continuous operatic tradition.

The season also included a concert as part of the Belfast Festival at Queens, featuring Dame Kiri Te Kanawa and Ben McAteer, winner of the company's inaugural Glenarm vocal competition. A new production of Orpheus in the Underworld, in a new translation by Rory Bremner, and with Nicholas Sharratt in the title role, co-produced with Scottish Opera, toured Scotland and Northern Ireland in Autumn 2011 before travelling to the Young Vic Theatre in London in December 2011.

In March 2012 Northern Ireland Opera toured a new production of The Turn of the Screw by Benjamin Britten which travelled to the Buxton Festival in July 2012. The cast included Fiona Murphy, Andrew Tortise, Giselle Allen and Yvonne Howard with Nicholas Chalmers conducting. The production was designed by Omagh-born Annemarie Woods, winner of the Ring And European Opera Awards 2011. The production subsequently travelled to Novaya Opera Theatre, Moscow in August 2014.

=== 2012–2013 season ===
The 2012–13 season was launched in June 2012 and it included five world premieres of works by Northern Irish composers: Brian Irvine, Deirdre McKay, Conor Mitchell, Ed Bennett and Christopher Norby, together with new libretti by writers including Mark Ravenhill and Frank McGuinness at the new MAC theatre in Belfast, in the company's latest collaboration with the Ulster Orchestra. The production was directed by Rachel O'Riordan and designed by Gary McCann. These new works travelled to the Southbank Centre in London in July 2012.

In July 2012 the company produced another opera by Benjamin Britten, Noye's Fludde. This site-specific production was performed in Belfast Zoo in August 2012, before travelling to Beijing as part of the Beijing International Music Festival in October 2012, the first time a production of one of Britten's operas has been to that country. It was performed again at the Shanghai Music in the Summer Air (MISA) Festival in July 2013.

In November 2012, Hansel and Gretel travelled to the Gaiety Theatre, Dublin, in a first visit to the Republic, in a collaboration with the RTÉ Concert Orchestra. It featured renowned tenor Graham Clark and a mainly Irish cast.

Other productions included the first Northern Irish staging of a Richard Wagner's opera, The Flying Dutchman in February 2013 as well as a touring version of William Walton's The Bear in March 2013.

=== 2013–2014 season ===
The season featured three co-productions with companies from Ireland and the UK. In October 2014, it became the first Irish company to premiere Gerald Barry's new opera version of The Importance of Being Earnest, which had premiered in concert in 2012 before receiving other 2013 productions in Nancy and London. This co-production with Wide Open Opera, directed and designed by Antony McDonald with the Crash Ensemble conducted by Pierre-André Valade, toured to Belfast, Dublin, Cork, and Derry.

The company also collaborated with Opera Theatre Company, Dublin, on a new production of Donizetti's opera L'elisir d'amore which toured Northern Ireland in September 2013, and the Republic of Ireland in autumn 2014.

In February 2014, the company co-produced a new version of Verdi's Macbeth with Welsh National Opera, directed by Oliver Mears, scheduled to be presented by WNO in its tour of Wales and England in autumn 2016.

=== 2014–2015 season ===
In July 2014, the company's production of The Turn of the Screw travelled to Nevill Holt in Leicestershire, before being presented at Novaya Opera Theatre in Moscow in performances conducted by Jan Latham Koenig.

In September 2014, the company toured its first version of The Magic Flute, a touring production, with sold-out performances at the Lyric Players' Theatre, Belfast.

In February 2015, Northern Ireland Opera presented its first Richard Strauss opera, Salome, at the Grand Opera House, Belfast, with the Ulster Orchestra. Giselle Allen sang the title role.

=== 2015–2016 season ===
The company's season opened with the world premiere performance of Brian Irvine's golf opera, Lovegolflove, a collaboration with playwright Owen McCafferty, as part of the Irish Open at Newcastle, County Down.

In September 2015, in collaboration with the Irish Chamber Orchestra, the company staged its first Handel opera, Agrippina, which toured Ireland and Northern Ireland, with Jonathan Cohen conducting.

October 2015 saw the opening of a new production of Turandot at the Grand Opera House, Belfast, directed by Calixto Bieito, a co-production with Théâtre du Capitole de Toulouse and Staatstheater Nürnberg. The cast included Orla Boylan, Marc Heller and Christopher Gillett.

=== 2016–2017 season ===
November 2016 saw Oliver Mears' swan song production of Don Giovanni at the Grand Opera House, Belfast. The Ulster Orchestra was conducted by Nicholas Chalmers. The title role was sung by Henk Neven. Supporting cast members John Molloy, Clive Bayley, Hye-Youn Lee, Rachel Kelly, Sam Furness, Aoife Miskelly and Christopher Cull brought to life a stylish, swaggering production conceived in partnership with set and costume designer Annemarie Woods, movement director Sarah Fahle, lighting designer D. M. Wood, and fight director Ciaran O'Grady.

Mears' final production as artistic director of Northern Ireland Opera was a collaborative venture with the Lyric Theatre, Belfast and Irish National Opera. Thomas Adès' chamber opera, Powder Her Face made its all-Ireland premiere in a brilliant new production conceived by director / designer Antony McDonald, in partnership with lighting designer Fabiana Piccioli, and movement director Lucy Burge. The Ulster Orchestra was conducted by Nicholas Chalmers. The scandalous life of the late Margaret, Duchess of Argyll was headlined by Mary Plazas in the lead role, with a multi-roling supporting cast of Adrian Dwyer, Stephen Richardson, Daire Halpin. After the Belfast premiere in January 2017, McDonald's production toured in the Republic of Ireland throughout February and March. For the touring production, the Irish National Opera Orchestra was conducted by Timothy Redmond.

April 2017 saw Puccini's La bohème performed in the Ulster Hall in a concert staging, in collaboration with the Ulster Orchestra, and the chorus of the Belfast Philharmonic Choir. Mimì and Rodolfo were sung by Giselle Allen and Jeffrey Hartman respectively, with a supporting cast including Brendan Collins, Gabrielle Mulcahy and BBC NI Young Musician platform awardee Aaron O'Hare. Rafael Payare conducted the Ulster Orchestra, and the chorus master was Stephen Doughty.

The final production of the season was an all-Ireland tour of Handel's Radamisto in a new English translation by Christopher Cowell. The Irish premiere of the opera was made possible through collaborative partnership with the Irish Chamber Orchestra, conducted by David Brophy. The creative team was led by director Wayne Jordan, and the cast included Doreen Curran and Aoife Miskelly in the lead roles.

=== 2017–2018 season ===
The season began in November with Mozart's Così fan tutte at the Grand Opera House, Belfast. Director Adele Thomas led a creative team including set and costume designer Hannah Clark and movement director Emma Woods in creating an "entertaining and elegant: production. The Ulster Orchestra was conducted by Nicholas Chalmers. The production toured to the Millennium Forum, Derry, and was later re-produced with the original cast by Nevill Holt Opera in July 2018, with Nicholas Chalmers conducting the Royal Northern Sinfonia.

January and February 2018 saw newly appointed artistic director Walter Sutcliffe's directing debut with the company, a revival of his production of Brecht/Weill's The Threepenny Opera at the Lyric Theatre, Belfast. The cast featured "a wealth of local talent" including local drag artist Cherrie Ontop (Matthew Cavan) in the role of Mrs Peachum, and was performed in English incorporating a Belfast-style dialect. The band was conducted by Sinead Hayes.

=== 2018–2019 season ===
The first major production of the 2018/19 season was a co-production with Ópera Nacional de Chile. Verdi's Rigoletto was presented at the Grand Opera House, Belfast in a production designed by Kaspar Glarner, and directed by Walter Sutcliffe. The cast featured Verdi Baritone Sebastian Catana in his UK debut, as well as Cardiff Singer of the World Nadine Koutcher as Gilda, and David Giusti as Duke of Mantua. The Ulster Orchestra was conducted by Gareth Hancock. The production opened with a Charity Gala Performance in aid of Inspire and NI Hospice.

The second major production of the 18/19 season was Stephen Sondheim's Sweeney Todd, which built upon recent collaborative ventures with the Lyric Theatre, Belfast as a creative partner. Like previous collaborations with The Lyric, this production featured both Musical Theatre and Opera performers, among whom Steven Page in the lead role of Sweeney received notable critical acclaim. Sinead Hayes conducted an "insinuating single-instrument band" while Wolfgang Goebbel's "hell lighting" and Dorota Karolczak's costume and set design "spiraled into madness" resulting in favorable reviews for Walter Sutcliffe's "compelling" staging.

=== 2019–2020 season ===
The first major production of the 2019/2020 season was Johann Strauss's Die Fledermaus, sung in a new English translation by Walter Sutcliffe and Meredith Oakes. Sutcliffe's original production incorporated the costume and set design of Andrea Kaempf. The cast featured many regular Northern Ireland Opera principals, with favorable reviews of Northern Ireland pantomime star and house-hold name, May McFetridge (John Linehan) in the quasi-cameo role of jailer Frosch, and countertenor Denis Lakey in the traditionally mezzo-soprano (en travesti) role of Prince Orlofsky. The production opened with a Charity Gala Performance raising funds for Homelessness & Women's Crisis Accommodation charity The Welcome Organisation at the Grand Opera House, Belfast. The Ulster Orchestra and the chorus of Northern Ireland Opera were conducted by Gareth Hancock.

The 2019/2020 season closed with Bella and Samuel Spewack/Porter's Kiss Me, Kate in a co-production with the Lyric Theatre as creative partner. Walter Sutcliffe's final production as artistic director received positive reviews, as did the original orchestrations and musical direction of Conor Mitchell. As in previous years, the spring co-production with the Lyric featured a cast of both musical theatre and opera artists. Set and costume designer Jon Bausor, and choreographer Jennifer Rooney also received favourable reviews for their respective roles

== The Festival of Voice ==
In 2011 Northern Ireland Opera launched its inaugural Festival of Voice at Glenarm, County Antrim, which features public recitals and events in partnership with and broadcast by BBC Radio 3. The festival culminates in a vocal competition hosted by Northern Ireland Opera patron and BBC Radio 3 presenter Sean Rafferty. Judges and coaches have included Iain Burnside, Kathryn Harries, David Gowland, Ingrid Surgenor, and Simon Lepper. In 2013, a series of recitals from the festival were broadcast as part of a BBC Radio 3 recital series, and this has formed part of the festival to the present day.

Year	Winners	Audience prize	Finalists	BBC recitalists
2011	Ben McAteer	John Porter	Rachel Kelly; Sarah Richmond; Lynda-Jane Workman	
2012	Dawn Burns	Anna Louise Costello	Laura Sheerin; Ross Scanlon; Mary McCabe	
2013	Sinéad O'Kelly	Sinéad O'Kelly	Laura Murphy; Rachel Goode; Rebecca Rodgers; Tara McSwiney	Ailish Tynan; Robin Tritschler
2014	Seán Boylan	Helen Aiken	Sarah Shine; Rachel Wolseley; Padraic Rowan	
2015	Aaron O'Hare	Maria McGrann	Katie Hainbach; Cormac Lawler; Aoife O'Connell	
2016	Malachy Frame	Rebecca Murphy	Lauren Scully; Richard Schaffrey; Robyn Richardson	Ilker Arcayürek; Simon Lepper; Aoife Miskelly; Will Vann; Clara Mouriz
2017	Peter Harris	Carolyn Holt	Elaine McDaid; Rory Dunne; Tim Shaffrey	Joseph Middleton; Jennifer Johnston; Gavan Ring; Toby Spence
2018	Margaret Bridge	Catherine Donnelly	Kathleen Nic Dhiarmada; Kelli-Ann Masterson; Ami Hewitt	Stephen Loges; Gemma Summerfield; Kitty Whately
2019	Ava Dodd	Brian McAlea	Dominica Williams; Susie Gibbons; Conor Breen	Joseph Middleton; Ema Nikolovska; Siobhan Stagg; Julien Van Mellaerts
2020	David Corr	Andrew Irwin	Jade Phoenix; Sarah Luttrell; David Howes	Simon Lepper; Kitty Whately; Ailish Tynan; James Newby

== Artistic directors ==
- Oliver Mears (2010–2017)
- Walter Sutcliffe (2017–2020)
- Cameron Menzies (2020–present)
