= Oliver Mears =

British theatre director

Oliver Mears (born 5 February 1979) is an English opera director.

== Early life ==
Mears was born in Norwich on 5 February 1979; his father was a solicitor.

He read English and History at Lincoln College, Oxford, where he was awarded a Double First Class Honours Degree in English and History. He began assisting the playwright and director Howard Barker while still at university, before becoming a Trainee Assistant Director at the King's Head Theatre, London.

== Career ==
=== Second Movement ===
Mears founded Second Movement as joint artistic director with the conductor Nicholas Chalmers. His productions for them included the UK stage premiere of Veniamin Fleishman's opera Rothschild's Violin, Mozart and Salieri, Trouble in Tahiti, A Hand of Bridge and The Knife's Tears. The latter production toured to Prague and Brno in the Czech Republic in October 2010.

=== Northern Ireland Opera ===
In 2010 Mears was appointed as the artistic director of the newly created Northern Ireland Opera. His productions for them have included The Medium, Tosca, which won the Irish Times Theatre Award for Best Opera in 2012, L'elisir d'amore, Flying Dutchman(Nominated for Achievement in Opera Award, Theatre Awards UK 2013), Macbeth, Salome and The Turn of the Screw. In August 2014 his production of The Turn of the Screw premiered at Novaya Opera Theatre, Moscow.

His production of Benjamin Britten's Noye's Fludde for Northern Ireland Opera was performed at the Beijing Music Festival in October 2012, the Chinese premiere of the piece.

He has also directed productions for the Young Vic, Aldeburgh Music, Early Opera Company, Opera North, Nederlandse Reisopera Holland, Pimlico Opera, Nevill Holt Opera and Scottish Opera, and directed Don Giovanni at Bergen National Opera in spring 2015.

In 2012, Mears was nominated for an Achievement in Opera award at the Theatre Awards UK, and in 2013, in the Best Newcomer category at the International Opera Awards.

== Royal Opera ==
On 12 September 2016 Mears was announced as the new Director of Opera at The Royal Opera, succeeding Kasper Holten who left the post on 11 March 2017. Said position is supported by Mick Davis and his wife Barbara Davis.

On 19 July 2025, during a curtain call following a performance of Giuseppe Verdi's Il trovatore at the Royal Opera House, Mears entered the stage and attempted, but failed, to snatch a Palestinian flag from one of the performers, Danni Perry, who had brought it on stage to unfurl while bowing in protest against the Gaza genocide. Perry later told Novara Media that after the curtain was lowered, Mears said to them: "You will never work at the opera house ever again". The altercation was recorded by audience members and later published online. The Royal Ballet and Opera described Perry's actions as "completely inappropriate".

In late July 2025, 182 members of the Royal Ballet and Opera signed an open letter sent to Alex Beard, chief executive and the Royal Ballet and Opera Board stating that they were deeply concerned about "recent actions and decisions taken by the board in the context of the ongoing genocide in Gaza". The letter expressed solidarity with Perry's "act of courage and moral clarity on our very stage" and condemned Mears' "extremely poor judgment" who was "witnessed attempting to forcibly snatch the flag from the performer, displaying visible anger and aggression in front of the entire audience" and sought for him "to be held accountable for his public display of aggression" which they described as "far from being a neutral administrative intervention [but] was itself a loud political statement. It sent a clear message that any visible solidarity with Palestine would be met with hostility while the organisations remains silent on the ongoing genocide … Mears does not represent us". The letter also referred to the company's recent hiring out of its production of Turandot to the Israeli Opera and stated: "The decision cannot be viewed as neutral. It is a deliberate alignment, materially and symbolically, with a government currently engaged in crimes against humanity".

The Guardian subsequently reported that Mears sent an internal email to staff in which he said he understood his colleagues' strong feeling about Gaza "because I share them. As I was disgusted by the atrocities on 7 October, I am sick to my stomach by the images and reports coming out of Gaza. At the same time, I believe it possible to hold political positions (which those who know me personally, know well) while also believing that a curtain call is not the time for a personal, impromptu political protest".
