= Edmund Finnis =

English composer

Edmund Finnis (born 1984) is a British composer of classical and electronic music. His works have been commissioned and performed by orchestras and ensembles including the Britten Sinfonia, Birmingham Contemporary Music Group, London Sinfonietta, BBC Scottish Symphony Orchestra and the Royal Liverpool Philharmonic Orchestra; the pianist Clare Hammond and the clarinettist Mark Simpson. He was recipient of a Paul Hamlyn Foundation Award in 2012 and is currently a Professor of Composition at the Royal Academy of Music, where his notable students have included William Marsey and Robin Haigh.

== Early life ==
Finnis was born in Oxford, where, as a child, he was a chorister at New College. Finnis went on to study composition with teachers including Julian Anderson, Paul Newland and Rozalie Hirs. He received a Leonard Bernstein Fellowship to study at Tanglewood and completed a doctorate at the Guildhall School of Music and Drama on the subject of distortion in acoustic instrumental music. Finnis also worked as an amanuensis for the composer Jonathan Harvey.

== Career ==
From 2013 to 2016 Finnis was composer-in-association with the London Contemporary Orchestra. They commissioned and premiered several of Finnis' works, including Across White Air for solo cello with reverb, Between Rain for string orchestra, and the electronic piece Colour Field Painting.

Finnis maintains a close collaboration with the contemporary ensemble Manchester Collective, who have consistently championed his music through numerous commissions, performances, and recordings. Among their collaborations is The Centre is Everywhere, a work for twelve string players that was performed at the BBC Proms and on tour, and later featured as the title track of the ensemble’s debut album, released in 2021 on the Bedroom Community label. Their partnership continued with the release of a second album, Shades (2022), which included two of Finnis’ string quartets as well as two additional commissions: Out of the Dawn’s Mind, a song cycle setting poems by Alice Oswald, and Blue Divided by Blue, written for choir, strings, and percussion.

Finnis also has a significant association with elderly new music ensemble the London Sinfonietta who have performed, toured and recorded six of his works, including three that they commissioned: Veneer, Unfolds and Seeing is Flux.

Finnis' duo piece for violin and viola, Brother was released as an EP in 2019, on NOMAD records, curated by the band Radiohead's guitarist Jonny Greenwood, who has expressed an enthusiasm for Finnis' work. An album of Finnis' music, The Air, Turning, was also released in February 2019 on NMC Recordings. The album received critical acclaim, receiving the BBC Music Magazine Premiere Award. In 2024, Youth, an EP of works for solo piano, recorded by Clare Hammond, was released by Pentatone.

Several works by Finnis form the soundtrack to the Icelandic film, Hvítur, Hvítur Dagur ("A White, White Day") which premiered at the 2019 Cannes Film Festival.

In addition to his concert works and film scores, Finnis has also contributed string arrangements to albums Goddess (2014) The Altar (2016) by the singer-songwriter Banks. Finnis worked with friend Orlando Higginbottom as part of the latter's dance-pop music act, Totally Enormous Extinct Dinosaurs, contributing as co-writer to an album, Trouble released in 2012.
