= Walter Sutcliffe =

British opera and theatre director (born 1976)

Walter Sutcliffe (born 1976) is a British opera and theatre director.

== Biography ==
The son of the opera critic Tom Sutcliffe and the playwright and librettist Meredith Oakes. Sutcliffe studied the bassoon at the Royal College of Music and at Cambridge University.

His productions have included Christopher Fry's The Lady's Not for Burning, Strindberg's The Great Highway and the Austrian premiere of Michael Tippett's The Knot Garden for the Klangbogen Festival in Vienna. He directed the American stage premiere of Leoš Janáček's first opera, Sarka, for Dicapo Opera, New York. In 2017, his new productions included Rigoletto in Santiago, Chile, Manon Lescaut in Osnabruck, and Eugen d'Albert's Tiefland in Toulouse.

At the Bockenheimer Depot for Frankfurt Opera, he directed the first production in Germany of Benjamin Britten's opera Owen Wingrave in January 2010, and of Aribert Reimann's Gespenstersonate in January 2014. Also in Frankfurt he staged Antonio Cesti's L'Orontea in February 2015. He has directed among other works, such as Mozart's Don Giovanni and Offenbach's Orpheus in the Underworld for the opera in Osnabrück, Verdi's Luisa Miller and La Traviata in Braunschweig, Werther and Kiss Me Kate in Magdeburg, Le Grand Macabre and Der Zwerg in Chemnitz, Cosi fan tutte and Carmen in Tallinn, Estonia, Otello in Turin, Owen Wingrave and The Turn of the Screw in Toulouse, and Albert Herring in Linz.

Sutcliffe was artistic director at NI Opera from January 2017 to April 2020. During his three year tenure, he oversaw productions of The Threepenny Opera, Rigoletto, Sweeney Todd, Die Fledermaus and Kiss Me, Kate. In 2021, he became Intendant (artistic director) and Director of Opera at Theater-Halle in Germany.

== Sources ==
- Emma Pomfrett, interview with Sutcliffe, Opera Now magazine, Nov/Dec 2008
