= Second Movement Opera =

UK opera company

Second Movement Opera is an opera company in the United Kingdom.

== About the Company ==
Second Movement was founded in 2004 as a chamber opera ensemble performing unorthodox opera productions in unusual spaces. It is a registered charity with a mission to provide opportunities for talented composers, singers and other professionals starting their careers in opera, in non-standard repertoire, and to bring opera to new audiences, those with limited access to the performing arts and marginalised groups. Some of its productions have been UK stage premieres, including Emily Howard’s Zatopek! commissioned as part of the UK Cultural Olympiad in 2012. Second Movement has performed in venues ranging from the former music halls Hoxton Hall in London and Epstein (formerly Neptune) Theatre in Liverpool, to the Reduta palace in Brno, Czech Republic.

In 2011 Second Movement launched its ongoing programme Rough for Opera to provide opportunities for composers and performers new to opera, to present new works and work-in-progress. In 2018 and 2020 Second Movement has collaborated with the National Opera Studio to engage NOS students in the development and performance of new music. In 2019 Second Movement launched its programme Your Story, Your Voice, Your Stage which encourages participation in the development of new opera by non-professionals, and brings the opportunity to engage in opera to people whose access to it has been limited, and to disadvantaged or marginalised groups.

Its current Artistic Directors are Nicholas Chalmers, Oliver Mears and Simon Holdsworth.

“Small Wonder" : In 2011, Second Movement was selected as one of the UK's seven leading small opera companies by Opera Now magazine.

== Rough for Opera ==
In 2010 Second Movement founded Rough for Opera a regular programme of performances in which young and emerging opera creators road test and showcase new ideas and evolving work. The performances take place at the Cockpit Theatre, Gateforth Street, London, NW8 8EH.

Rough Ideas Robert Thickness applauds an initiative that provides a platform for new works-in-progress while testing the idea for what opera can and should be for today’s creators and audiences, Opera Now March 2017

Rough for Opera on 24 March 2013 included Kate Whitley's Scars, based on a text by Stephanie Ndoungo, which was written as part of Freedom From Torture's creating writing group 'Write To Life'.

Rough for opera composers: Kim B Ashton, Ed Baxter, Oded Ben-Tal, Michael Betteridge, Georgina Bowden, Santa Buss, Alexander Campkin, Timothy Cape, James Cave, Mike Christie, Anna Clock, Lloyd Coleman, Adam Dixon, Leo Geyer, Alex Groves, Edward Henderson, Jonathan Higgins, Alex Ho, Aaron Holloway-Nahum, Leo Hurley, Danyal Dhondy, Fraz Ireland, Catherine Kontz, Benjamin Lunn, Peter Longworth, William Marsey, David Merriman, Alex Mills, Michael-Jon Mizra, Helen Noir, Alex Paxton, Phil Poppy, Tom Randle, Ed Scoldng, Simone Spagnolo, Josh Spear, Amir Mahyar Tafreshipour, Benjamin Tassie, Martin Ward, Jenni Watson, Kate Whitley, Caroline Wilkins, Jonathan Woolgar.

== Collaboration with the National Opera Studio ==
In 2018 Second Movement commenced a collaboration with the National Opera Studio to bring together each of the singers in the National Opera Studio’s current programme with a composers and a librettist, to develop and perform an aria on a theme chosen by, or of relevance to the singer. The first event was 12.20 in July 2018 in the Hoxton Hall. Composers included Philip Venables and Hannah Kendall. In 2020 the programme was conducted mostly online, with the singers and repetiteurs coming together in July to perform the arias, but without a live audience. A filmed recording of the performances and a film of the process of composition were launched in November 2020.

== Your Story, Your Voice, Your Stage ==
In 2019 Second Movement launched Your Story Your Voice Your Stage, a programme to support collaboration and involvement in opera composition and performance by participants new to opera who are not normally professional performers, working alongside professional composers and musicians. The launch took place at Rough for Opera in May 2019. The launch included a performance of Speak Red by composer Santa Buss and director FXXX BXXXXX, developed with people living with aphasia and speech therapists, some of whom took part in the performance, alongside cellist Heloise Werner.

The Your Story Your Voice Your Stage programme has continued with the composition of an opera in collaboration with the charity Tourettes Action, under the leadership of composer Michael Betteridge.

== Productions ==
2012: Zátopek! by Emily Howard

Second Movement commissioned and performed Zátopek! https://www.youtube.com/watch?v=qO8YkbZHDWE a 12-minute opera inspired by the life and times of legendary Czech long distance runner Emil Zátopek, as part of PRS for Music Foundation's New Music 20x12, which supported the creation of 20 new pieces of music for the Cultural Olympiad. Zátopek! was created by composer Emily Howard and librettist Selma Dimitrijevich – co-artistic director of the Grayscale Theatre Company, and performed by Second Movement with Ensemble 10/10 in Liverpool and London in 2012.

Director Danielle Urbas; singers John McManus, Peter Brathwaite, Wendy Dawn Thompson, Rosalind Coad, Toby Girling, Kris Belligh, Suzanne Dymott; Conductor Clark Rendell, Music director Nicholas Chalmers, Design Consultant Simon Holdsworth.

The world premiere of Zátopek! took place on 15 June 2012 at the Epstein Theatre, Liverpool, presented by Second Movement in partnership with Liverpool Philharmonic. The performance was broadcast on Hear and Now on BBC Radio 3 on 16 June and is available for download from NMC Recordings The second performance took place at the Purcell Room, South Bank Centre London on 15 July 2012, as part of the New Music 20x12 Weekend Celebration The composer of Zatopek Emily Howard describes how the opera was created in an interview with the PRS for New Music Foundation

A review of the first performance in the Liverpool Echo. was enthusiastic: “ Zatopek! …..is as unreservedly entertaining as the man it pays tribute to. That comes partly from the score, performed last night by Ensemble 10/10 relegated to the pit at the (N)Epstein, partly from the singers from opera company Second Movement, who built up a sweat performing in singlets and shorts Chariots of Fire style, and partly from the simple but effective visuals of the staging – ” The reviewer in The Guardian commented : “Howard's score captures Zátopek's oddball personality by setting him at a slight harmonic variant with the rest of the field. Selma Dimitrijevic's libretto evokes a military chorus, a love duet with his javelin-throwing wife Dana (herself an Olympic champion) and a tipsy, beer-hall song of celebration; all in slightly less time than it took Zátopek to complete 12-and-a-half laps. Intelligent use of projection gives Danielle Urbas's production a sense of grainy newsreel footage. Ensemble 10/10 present a meticulous rendering of the score's fluid, dream-like structure under Clark Rundell; and John McMunn's Zátopek shows an admirable ability to execute a punishing, high-lying tenor role while performing press-ups and jogging on the spot.”

Paul Morley reviewed the London performance on BBC 2’s The Review Show on 20 July 2012. He described it as “a tremendous performance” Vanessa Feltz also discussed the work in The Express. “Emily Howard’s extraordinary work – a re-creation in real time of the thrilling event” and prompted recollections of Zatopek in Vanessa Feltz’s programme on BBC radio London

A film of Second Movement’s performance of Zatopek!, taken at the Purcell Room by NYLON films, on behalf of the PRS for Music Foundation, is available on The Space. The Space is the Arts Council/BBC digital Channel and Zatopek! is available to view alongside the other 19 pieces in New Music 20x12.

2011 : The Medium by Gian Carlo Menotti

In February 2011, The Medium by Gian Carlo Menotti, a Second Movement production first staged in 2006, was performed in a tour of Northern Ireland by NI Opera in association with Second Movement, with performances in the Strule Arts Centre, Omagh; The Great Hall, Downpatrick; Theatre at the Mill, Newtownabbey and The Market Place Theatre, Armagh. The production was directed by Oliver Mears with conductor Nicholas Chalmers and stage designer Simon Holdsworth. The cast were Yvette Bonner, David Butt Philip, Doreen Curran (in the title role of Madam Flora), Alison Dunne, Jane Harrington, and the actor Will Stokes.

2010 : The Knife's Tears by Bohuslav Martinů

The Knife's Tears by Bohuslav Martinů, a Second Movement production first staged in 2007, was performed by Second Movement at the Reduta, Brno and Divadlo DISK, Prague, in October 2010. The director was Oliver Mears, conductor Nicholas Chalmers, set designer Simon Holdsworth, and the cast were Yvette Bonner, Johnathan Brown and Hannah Pedley.

Czech television broadcast extracts from the performance and an interview with Oliver Mears and Nicholas Chalmers.

The performance was discussed on Czech Radio in an interview with Ivan Kytka.

The performance was part of a Triple Bill with two operas performed by the Ensemble Opera Diversa of Brno : Ela, Hela a Stop by Lukáš Sommer based on a text by Václav Havel, and Dýňový démon ve vegetariánské restauraci (The Pumpkin Demon in a Vegetarian Restaurant) by Ondřej Kyas, libretto by Pavel Drábek.

2010: The Three Wishes (Martinu) – scenes

2008: Fade (Stefan Weisman), A Hand of Bridge (Samuel Barber), Trouble in Tahiti (Leonard Bernstein)

2007: The Knife's Tears (Martinu), Rothschild's Violin (Fleishman/Shostakovich), The Two Blind Men (Offenbach)

2006: The Impresario (Mozart), The Medium (Menotti)

2005: Trouble in Tahiti (Leonard Bernstein)

2004: Mozart and Salieri (Rimsky-Korsakov)
