= Noye's Fludde =

1958 children's opera by Benjamin Britten

- Opera by Benjamin Britten
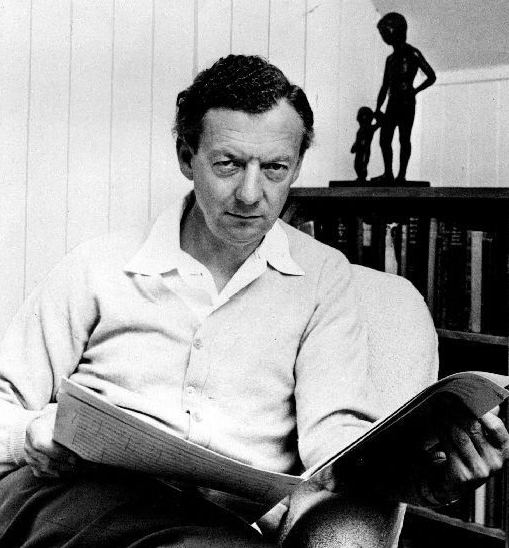
- The composer in 1968
- Language: Middle English
- Based on: 15th-century Chester Mystery Play
- Premiere: 18 June 1958; St Bartholomew's Church, Orford (Aldeburgh Festival)

Noye's Fludde (Middle English for Noah's Flood) (Note: "Noye" is pronounced as "No-ah". The Medieval English spelling of Noah's Flood is taken from the opera's Chester Mystery Play source, as edited by Alfred W. Pollard in English Miracle Plays, Moralities, and Interludes (Clarendon Press, Oxford).) is a one-act opera by the British composer Benjamin Britten, intended primarily for amateur performers, particularly children. First performed on 18 June 1958 at that year's Aldeburgh Festival, it is based on the 15th-century Chester "mystery" or "miracle" play which recounts the Book of Genesis story of Noah's Ark. Britten specified that the opera should be staged in churches or large halls, not in a theatre.

By the mid-1950s Britten had established himself as a major composer, both of operas and of works for mixed professional and amateur forces – his mini-opera The Little Sweep (1949) was written for young audiences, and used child performers. He had previously adapted text from the Chester play cycle in his 1952 Canticle II, which retells the story of Abraham and Isaac. Noye's Fludde was composed as a project for television; to the Chester text Britten added three congregational hymns, the Greek prayer Kyrie eleison as a children's chant, and an Alleluia chorus. A large children's chorus represents the pairs of animals who march into and out of the ark, and proceedings are directed by the spoken Voice of God. Of the solo sung roles, only the parts of Noye (Noah) and his wife were written to be sung by professionals; the remaining roles are for child and adolescent performers. A small professional ensemble underpins the mainly amateur orchestra which contains numerous unconventional instruments to provide particular musical effects; bugle fanfares for the animals, handbell chimes for the rainbow, and various improvisations to replicate musically the sounds of a storm.

At its premiere Noye's Fludde was acclaimed by critics and public alike, both for the inspiration of the music and the brilliance of the design and production. The opera's American premiere took place in New York in March 1959, and its first German performance occurred at Ettal in May of that year. Since then it has been staged worldwide; the performance in Beijing in October 2012 organised by the KT Wong Foundation was the first in China of any Britten opera. The occasion of Britten's centenary in 2013 led to numerous productions at music festivals, both in the UK and abroad.

== Background ==
=== Chester mystery plays ===
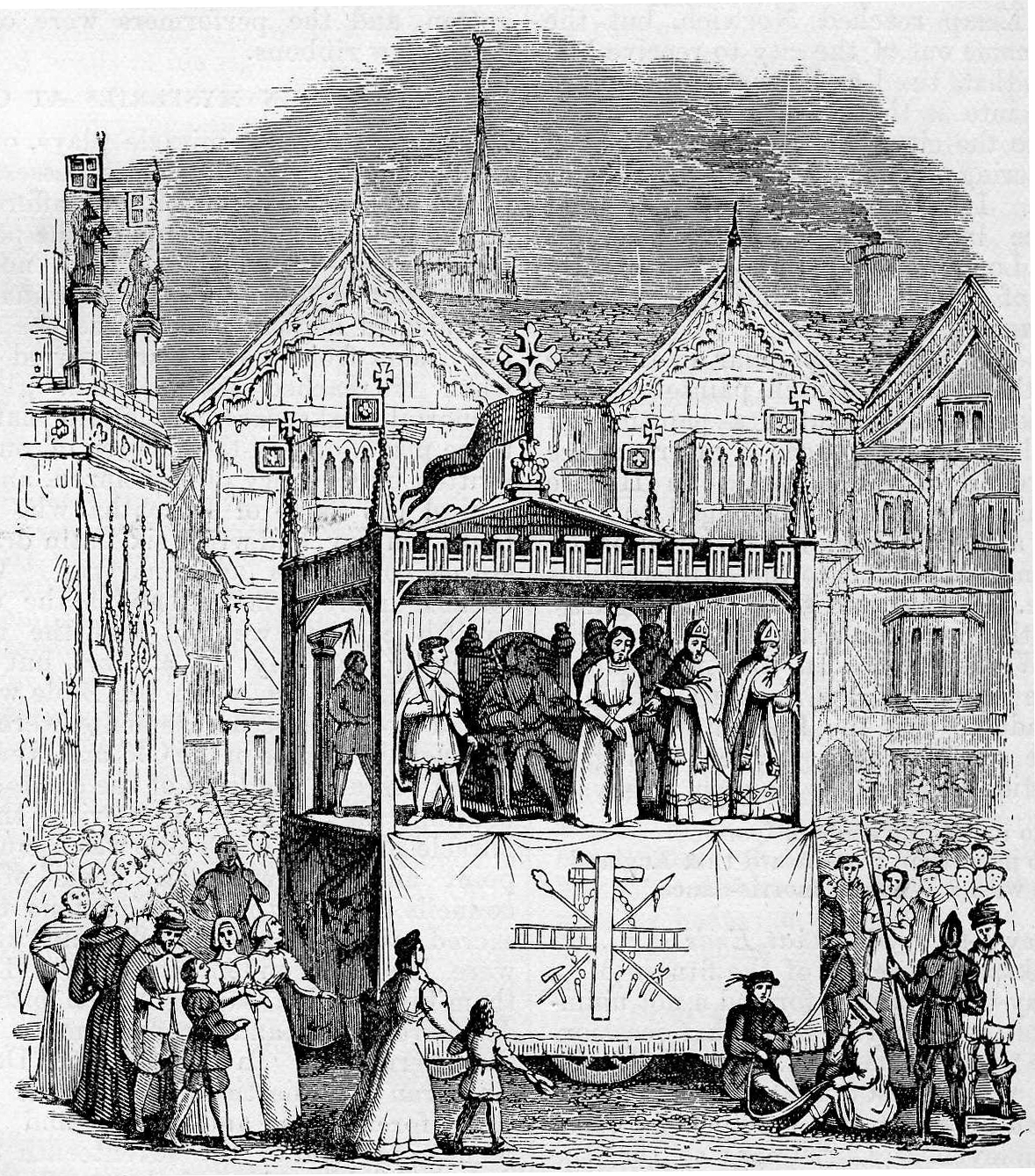
14th/15th-century performance of the Chester mystery plays, on a pageant cart

English mystery or "miracle" plays were dramatised Bible stories, by ancient tradition performed on Church feast days in town squares and market places by members of the town's craft guilds. They covered the full range of the narrative and metaphor in the Christian Bible, from the fall of Lucifer to the Last Judgement. From the many play cycles that originated in the late Middle Ages, the Chester cycle is one of four that have survived into the 21st century. The texts, by an unidentified writer, were revised during the late 15th century into a format similar to that of contemporary French passion plays, and were published in 1890, in Alfred W. Pollard's English Miracle Plays, Moralities, and Interludes. (Note: The original authorship of the Chester cycle is sometimes attributed to Ranulf Higden, otherwise known as Roger of Chester, a much-respected historian of the city, although there is little direct evidence to support this.)

The story of Noah and the flood, the third play in the Chester cycle, was originally performed by the city's Guild of the Drawers of Dee, otherwise known as the water-carriers. A feature of this play, observed by the historian Rosemary Woolf, is the depiction of Noah's wife, and by implication women generally, as disobedient, obdurate and finally abusive, in contrast to the "grave and obedient" Noah and his patient sons.

By the latter part of the 16th-century Reformation, the Church had grown less tolerant of mystery plays. A performance in Chester in 1575 is the last recorded from the city until the 20th century, when the Chester cycle was revived under the supervision of Christopher Ede, as part of the city's Festival of Britain celebrations in June 1951. This production was received enthusiastically, and was repeated the following year; thereafter it became a regular feature and tourist attraction.

=== Inception ===
By the late 1940s Benjamin Britten had established himself as a leading composer of English opera, with several major works to his credit. In 1947 he suggested to his librettist Eric Crozier that they should create a children's opera, based on a bible story. Crozier gave Britten a copy of Pollard's book, as a possible source of material. Nothing came of this project immediately; instead, Britten and Crozier wrote the cantata Saint Nicolas (1948), the first of several works in which Britten combined skilled performers with amateurs. The cantata involves at least two children's choirs, and incorporates two congregational hymns sung by the audience. Britten also used this fusion of professional with amateur forces in The Little Sweep (1949), which forms the second part of his entertainment for children, Let's Make an Opera, that he devised with Crozier. Again, child singers (also doubling as actors) were used, and the audience sings choruses at appropriate points. In 1952, although Britten's collaboration with Crozier had ended, he used the Chester plays book as the source text for his Canticle II, based on the story of Abraham and Isaac.

In April 1957 Boris Ford, Head of Schools Broadcasting at Associated Rediffusion (A-R), wrote to Britten, proposing a series of half-hour programmes. These would show Britten composing and rehearsing a work through to its performance, and would provide children with "an intimate piece of musical education, by ... watching a piece of music take shape and in some degree growing with it". Britten was initially cautious. He found the idea interesting, but he warned Ford that he was currently occupied with travel and had limited time for writing. He was also anxious not to cover the same ground as he had with Let's Make an Opera. However, he agreed to meet Ford to discuss the project further. On 11 July they met in London, together with Britten's musical assistant Imogen Holst. Britten told Ford that he had "for some months or a year vaguely been thinking of doing something with the [Chester] miracle plays", and agreed to write an opera for A-R's 1958 summer term of school programmes. The subject would be Noah and the flood, based on the Chester text. Later, Ford and his script editor, Martin Worth, travelled to Aldeburgh, and with Britten looked at possible churches for the performance. St Bartholomew's Church, Orford, was chosen as, unlike most other churches in East Suffolk, its pews were not fixed, thus offering a more flexible performing space.

== Roles ==
Roles, voice types, premiere cast
| Role | Voice type | Premiere cast, 18 June 1958 (Conductor: Charles Mackerras) |
|---|---|---|
| The Voice of God | spoken role | Trevor Anthony |
| Noye | bass-baritone | Owen Brannigan |
| Mrs Noye | contralto | Gladys Parr |
| Sem | treble | Thomas Bevan |
| Ham | treble | Marcus Norman |
| Jaffett | tenor or treble | Michael Crawford |
| Mrs Sem | girl soprano | Janette Miller |
| Mrs Ham | girl soprano | Katherine Dyson |
| Mrs Jaffett | girl soprano | Marilyn Baker |
| Mrs Noye's Gossips | girl sopranos | Penelope Allen, Doreen Metcalfe, Dawn Mendham, Beverley Newman |
| The Raven | silent role | David Bedwell |
| The Dove | silent role | Maria Spall |
Children's chorus of animals and birds; congregation

== Synopsis ==
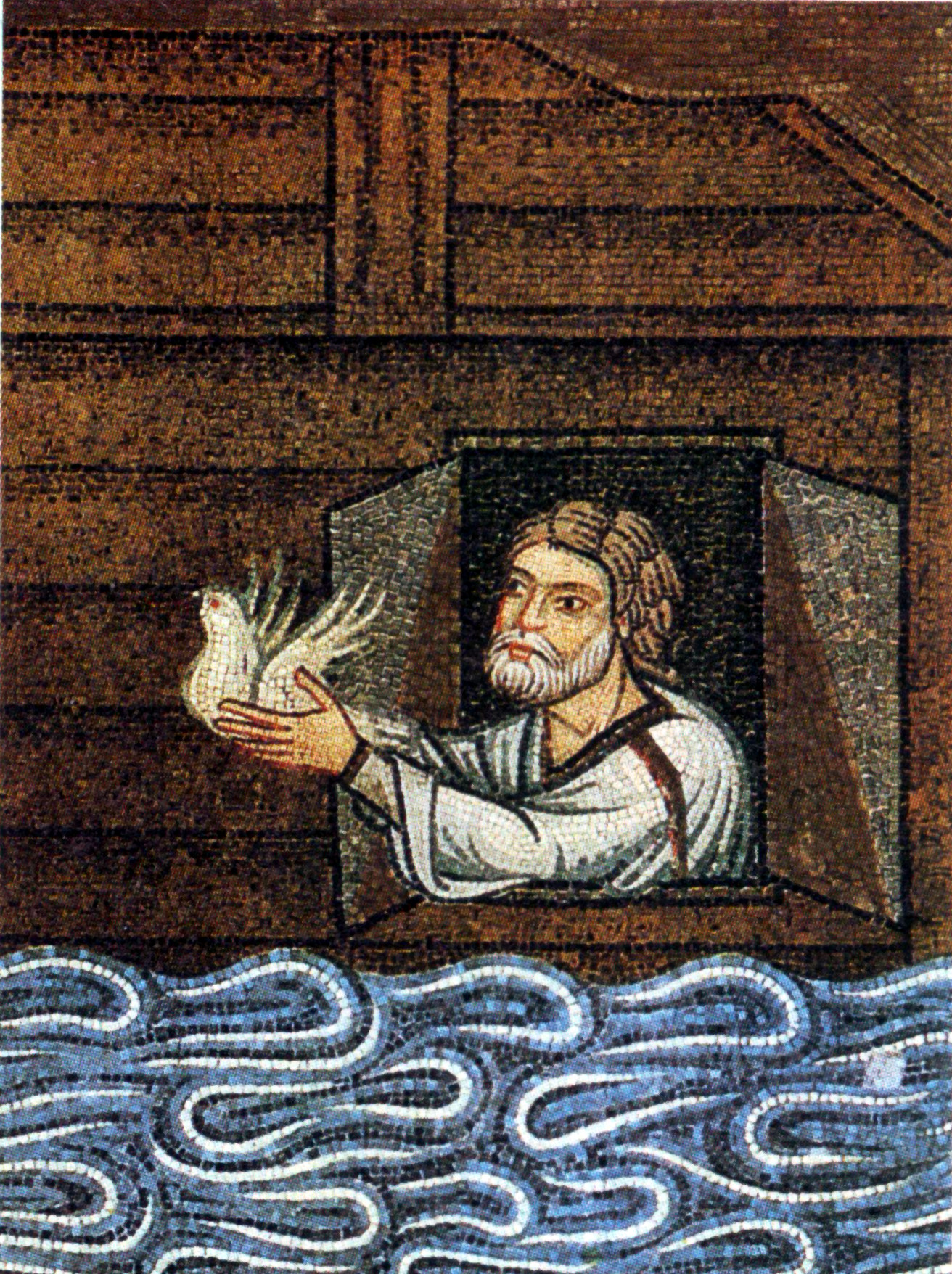
13th-century mosaic depicting Noah in the ark

After the opening congregational hymn "Lord Jesus, think on me", the spoken Voice of God addresses Noye, announcing the forthcoming destruction of the sinful world. God tells Noye to build an ark ("a shippe") that will provide salvation for him and his family. Noye agrees, and calls on the people and his family to help. His sons and their wives enter with tools and materials and begin work, while Mrs Noye and her Gossips (close friends) mock the project.

When the ark is completed, Noye tries to persuade his wife to enter: "Wyffe, in this vessel we shall be kepte", but she refuses, and they quarrel. The Voice of God foretells forty days and forty nights of rain, and instructs Noye to fill the ark with animals of every kind. The animals enter the ark in pairs, while Noye's sons and their wives provide a commentary. Noye orders his family to board the ark; again Mrs Noye and the Gossips refuse, preferring to carouse. The sons finally drag Mrs Noye on board, while the Gossips are swept away by the encroaching flood; she rewards her husband with a slap. Rain begins to fall, building to a great storm at the height of which the first verse of the naval hymn "Eternal Father, Strong to Save" is heard from the ark. The congregation joins in the second and third verses of the hymn, during which the storm gradually subsides. When it is calm, Noye sends out a Raven, saying "If this foule come not againe/it is a signe soth to sayne/that dry it is on hill or playne." When the Raven fails to return, Noye knows that the bird has discovered dry land. He sends out a Dove, who eventually brings back an olive branch. Noah accepts this as a sign of deliverance, and thanks God.

The Voice of God instructs everyone to leave the ark. As they do, the animals sing "Alleluias" and the people sing a chorus of praise: "Lord we thanke thee through thy mighte". God promises that he will never again destroy the earth with water, and produces a rainbow as his token. The cast begins Addison's hymn "The spacious firmament on high", with the congregation joining in the last two verses. All the cast depart except Noye, who receives God's blessing and promise of no more vengeance: "And nowe fare well, my darling deare" before his departure from the stage.

== Creation ==
=== Writing ===
Britten began detailed planning for the opera in August 1957, while sailing to Canada for a tour with the English Opera Group. He told Colin Graham, at that time the EOG's stage manager, that he wanted him to direct the new work. After a further meeting at Associated Rediffusion's London headquarters on 18 October, Britten began a composition draft in Aldeburgh on 27 October. (Note: On 25 October TV Times announced: "Benjamin Britten is writing a new opera for children – specially for ITV Schools Television Service. I rate this a great musical capture on the part of Boris Ford, head of Associated-Rediffusion Schools Broadcasting.") To Pollard's edition of the Noah play's text, he added three congregational Anglican hymns: "Lord Jesus, think on me"; "Eternal Father, strong to save"; and "The spacious firmament on high". (Note: "Lord Jesus, think on me": words by Synesius of Cyrene (tr. A. W. Chatfield), tune from Damon's Psalter. "Eternal Father, strong to save": words by William Whiting, tune "Melita" by John Bacchus Dykes. "The spacious firmament on high": words by Joseph Addison, tune "Tallis' Canon" by Thomas Tallis.) Britten introduced the repetitive Greek chant "Kyrie eleison" ("Lord, have mercy") at the entry of the animals, and "Alleluias" at their triumphant exit. He had completed about two-thirds of the opera when Ford was dismissed from A-R, allegedly for administrative shortcomings and inexperience. A-R decided to withdraw from the project, which was then taken up by Associated Television (ATV), whose chairman Lew Grade personally took responsibility for signing the contract and urged that Britten should complete the opera.

In November 1957 Britten moved to The Red House, Aldeburgh, but continued to work on the opera throughout the upheaval. According to a letter he wrote to Edith Sitwell on 14 December, "the final bars of the opera [were] punctuated by hammer-blows" from workmen busy at the Red House. Before he finished the composition draft, Britten wrote to the baritone Owen Brannigan, who had sung in several previous Britten operas, asking if he would take the title role. Britten completed the full score of the opera in March 1958, which he dedicated "To my nephew and nieces, Sebastian, Sally and Roguey Welford, and my young friend Ronald Duncan [one of Britten's godsons]".

=== Performance requirements ===
The Chester Miracle plays were written in the 14th century by ordinary people for performance by the craftsmen and tradesmen and their families. Each Guild chose one play from the cycle and acted it on a cart called a "pageant" ... This essentially unsophisticated style of presentation would clearly be out of place in the artificial world of the theatre; a much closer relationship with the audience is needed, and Noye's Fludde in this musical version is intended for the same style of presentation – although not necessarily on a cart.

— Programme note by Colin Graham, for a Southwark performance in November 1958.

With the wide variety of child performers required in the opera, and in light of how it was cast and performed at its premiere, Britten detailed some of its specific requirements for performance in the vocal and study scores published by Boosey & Hawkes. The opera is intended for a large hall or church, not a theatre. The action should take place on raised rostra, though not on a formal stage set apart from the audience, and the orchestra should be placed in full sight, with the conductor in a position to conduct both the orchestra and, when performing the hymns, the congregation. Noye and Mrs Noye are sung by "accomplished singer-actors", and the Voice of God, although not necessarily a professional actor, should have "a rich speaking voice, with a simple and sincere delivery, without being at all 'stagey'". The young amateurs playing the parts of Noye's children should be between 11 and 15 years old, with "well-trained voices and lively personalities"; Jaffet, the eldest, could have a broken voice. Mrs Noye's Gossips should be older girls with strong voices and considerable acting ability. The children playing the animals should vary in size, and range in age from seven to eighteen. The older age groups, with perhaps some broken voices, should represent the larger animals (lions, leopards, horses, camels etc.), while the younger play rats, mice and birds. There is a dance or ballet involving two child performers playing the roles of the raven and the dove.

For the first time in any of his works involving amateurs, Britten envisaged a large complement of child performers among his orchestral forces, led by what Graham described as "the professional stiffening" of a piano duet, string quintet (two violins, viola, cello and bass), recorder and a timpanist. The young musicians play a variety of instruments, including a full string ensemble with each section led by a member of the professional string quintet. The violins are further divided into parts of different levels of difficulty, from the simplest (mostly playing open strings) to those able to play in third position. The recorders should be led by an accomplished soloist able to flutter-tongue; bugles, played in the original production by boys from a local school band, are played as the children representing animals march into the ark, and at the climax of the opera. (Note: An old friend of Britten's from Gresham's School, David Layton, was convinced that the bugles of Noye's Fludde recalled the school's Officer Training Corps band practising in front of the cricket pavilion, where there was a "grand echo", while he and Britten were nearby in the nets.) The child percussionists, led by a professional timpanist, play various exotic and invented percussion instruments: (Note: Graham recalled that the timpanist, James Blades, "rejoiced in helping Woolverstone Hall [the school providing the percussionists] devise outlandish percussion instruments to be played alongside the slung mugs and the wind machine". The critic Rollo Myers noted at the first performance that "Cups and saucers and dishes were also pressed into service to strengthen the percussion in places, but effects were never abused.") the score itself specifies sandpaper ("two pieces of sandpaper attached to blocks of wood and rubbed together"), and "Slung Mugs", the latter used to represent the first drops of rain. Britten originally had the idea of striking teacups with a spoon, but having failed to make this work, he sought Imogen Holst's advice. She recalled that "by great good fortune I had once had to teach Women's Institute percussion groups during a wartime 'social half hour', so I was able to take him into my kitchen and show him how a row of china mugs hanging on a length of string could be hit with a large wooden spoon.

Britten also added – relatively late in the process of scoring the work – an ensemble of handbell ringers. According to Imogen Holst, a member of the Aldeburgh Youth Club brought Britten's attention to a local group of bellringers; hearing them play, Britten was so enchanted by the sound that he gave the ensemble a major part to play as the rainbow unfolds towards the end of the opera. Several commentators, including Michael Kennedy, Christopher Palmer and Humphrey Carpenter, have noted the affinity between the sound of Britten's use of the handbells and the gamelan ensembles he had heard first-hand in Bali in 1956. The scarcity of handbells tuned at several of the pitches required by Britten in the opera was to become an issue when the score was being prepared for publication.

== Performance history and reception ==
=== Premiere ===
The first performance of Noye's Fludde was staged during the 1958 Aldeburgh Festival, at St Bartholomew's Church, Orford, on 18 June. The conductor was Charles Mackerras, who had participated in several productions at past Aldeburgh festivals. The production was directed by Colin Graham, who also designed its set, with costume designs by Ceri Richards. (Note: To aid rehearsals, Britten prepared a "demo" record of the opera with himself at the piano, and the various roles sung by him, Peter Pears, Imogen Holst, the composer's two sisters and Colin Graham. John Schlesinger made a documentary for the BBC's Monitor programme of the production as it was being rehearsed.)

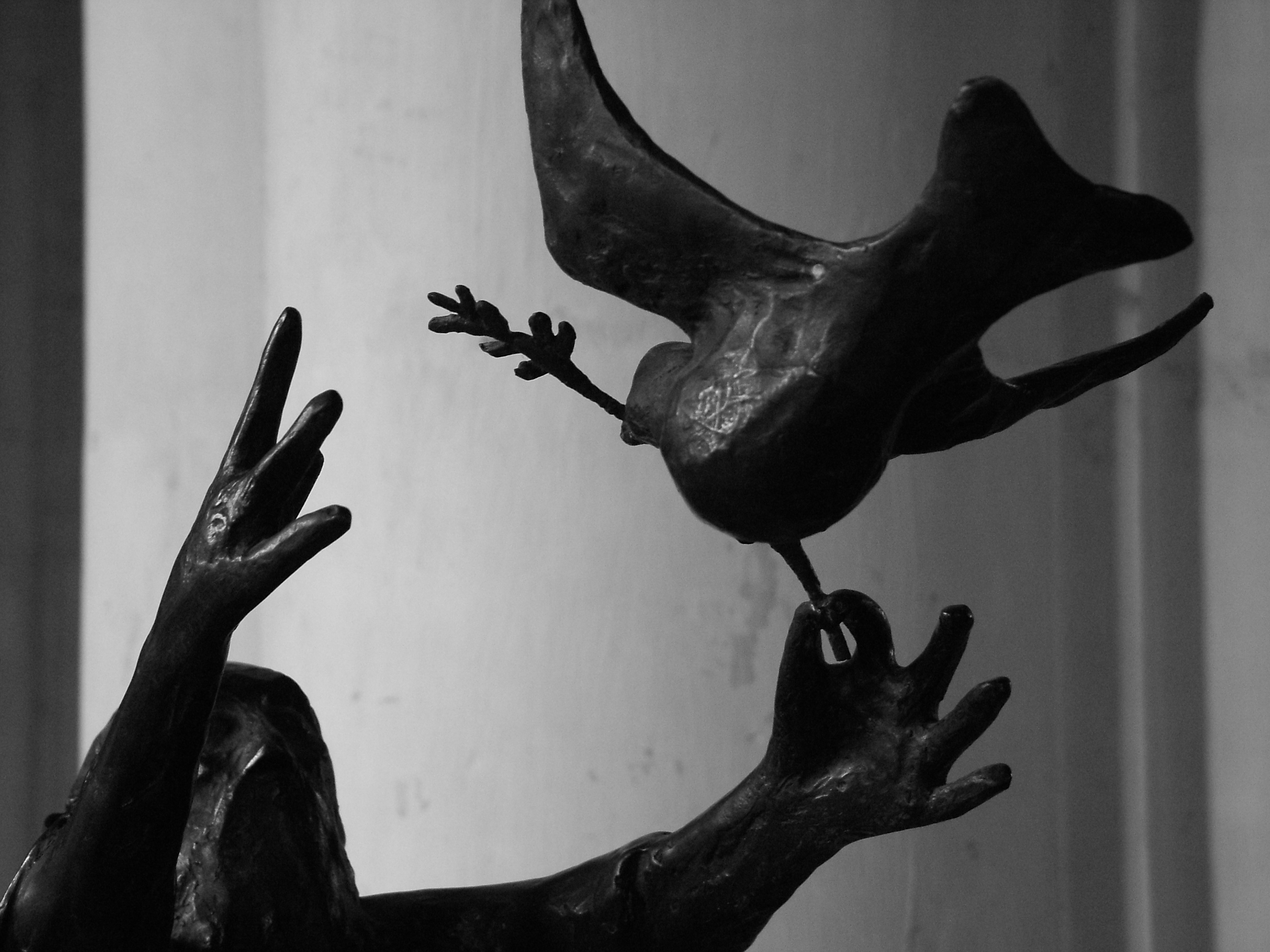
Detail from a statue of Noah and the dove in Orford Church, where Noye's Fludde was first performed

Apart from Brannigan as Noye, two other professional singers were engaged: Gladys Parr, in her last role before retirement, sang the part of Mrs Noye, and the spoken Voice of God was provided by the Welsh bass Trevor Anthony. The other major roles were taken by child soloists, who were selected from extensive auditions. Among these was the future actor-singer, Michael Crawford, then 16 years old and described by Graham as "a very recently broken-voiced young tenor", who played the role of Jaffet. (Note: Crawford had earlier performed in a production of The Little Sweep, sharing the title role of Sammy with David Hemmings; the cast subsequently recorded that opera with Britten conducting. In later life Crawford acknowledged the debt he owed to Britten: "Had it not been for him, I don't think I would have been an actor. He was very patient and encouraging. Throughout my career he always sent me good luck telegrams".) Mrs Noye's Gossips were originally to be performed by girls from a Suffolk school, but when the headmistress heard rumours about the "dissolute" parts they were to play, she withdrew her pupils.

The professional element in the orchestra was provided by the English Opera Group players, led by Emanuel Hurwitz, with Ralph Downes at the organ. The children players, billed as "An East Suffolk Children's Orchestra", included handbell ringers from the County Modern School, Leiston; a percussion group, whose instruments included the slung mugs, from Woolverstone Hall School; recorder players from Framlingham College; and bugle players from the Royal Hospital School, Holbrook. Graham, recalling the premiere some years later, wrote: "The large orchestra (originally 150 players) (Note: Eric Roseberry, writing shortly after the premiere, noted closer to half that number: the "young persons' ripieno orchestra of strings, recorders and percussion ... numbered twenty violins, three violas, six 'cellos, two double basses, eight descant recorders, five treble recorders, a percussion section of eight and a team of six handbells".) ... were massed around the font of Orford Church while the opera was played out on a stage erected at the end of the nave." Philip Hope-Wallace, writing for The Manchester Guardian, observed that "Charles Mackerras conducted the widespread forces, actually moving round a pillar to be able to control all sections in turn." Martin Cooper of The Daily Telegraph noted: "The white walls of Orford Church furnished an ideal background to the gay colours of Ceri Richards's costumes and the fantastic head-dresses of the animals. In fact, the future of the work will lie in village churches such as this and with amateur musicians, for whom Britten has written something both wholly new and outstandingly original."

The general critical reception was warmly enthusiastic. Felix Aprahamian in The Sunday Times called the performance "a curiously moving spiritual and musical experience". Eric Roseberry, writing in Tempo magazine, found the music "simple and memorably tuneful throughout ... the writing for strings, recorders and percussion is a miracle of inspiration". Andrew Porter in Opera magazine also found the music touched "by high inspiration"; the evening was "an unforgettable experience ... extraordinarily beautiful, vivid and charming, and often deeply moving". The design and production, Porter reported, were "brilliant", while Mackerras commanded his disparate forces masterfully. Several critics remarked favourably on the sound of the handbells. The Times's critic noted the effectiveness of Britten's setting of the mystery play: "It is Britten's triumph that in this musically slender piece he has brought to new life the mentality of another century by wholly modern means. These means included a miscellaneous orchestra such as he alone could conceive and handle".

After the premiere, there were two further performances by the same forces in Orford Church, on 19 and 21 June. Noye's Fludde became the first of Britten's operas to be shown on television, when it was broadcast by ATV on 22 June 1958.

=== Later performances ===
Noye's Fludde had been largely created according to the resources available from the local Suffolk community. However, once Britten witnessed the public and critical reception following the premiere, he insisted on taking it to London. Looking for a suitable London church, Britten settled on Southwark Cathedral, somewhat reluctantly as he felt that it did not compare favourably with Orford. Four performances featuring the same principals as the premiere were given, on 14 and 15 November 1958, with Britten conducting the first. All four performances sold out on the first day of booking, even, as Britten told a friend, "before any advertisement & with 2000 circulars yet to be sent!!" On 24 and 25 April 1959 the Finchley Children's Music Group, which was formed in 1958 specially to perform Noye's Fludde, gave what was billed as "the first amateur London performance" of the work, at All Saint's Church, Finchley; the cast included the operatic bass Norman Lumsden as Noah.

In the United States, after a radio broadcast in New York City on 31 July 1958, the School of Sacred Music of Union Theological Seminary staged the US premiere on 16 March 1959. The following year saw the opera's Canadian premiere, conducted by John Avison, staged during the 1960 Vancouver International Festival in Christ Church Cathedral.

During preparations for the first German performance of Noye's Fludde in Ettal, planned for May 1959, it became clear that they could not get the handbells called for in the score. Britten suggested that in the absence of handbells a set of tubular bells in E flat in groups of twos and threes could be played by four or six children with two hammers each to enable them to strike the chords. Britten was not present in Ettal, but he learned from Ernst Roth, of Boosey & Hawkes, that the Ettal production had substituted glockenspiel and metallophone for the handbells; according to Roth the bells in Carl Orff's Schulwerk percussion ensembles were "too weak" for the purpose. Britten later wrote to a friend: "I am rather relieved that I wasn't there! – no church, no bugles, no handbells, no recorders – but they seem to have done it with a great deal of care all the same. Still I rather hanker after doing it in Darmstadt as we want it – even importing handbells for instance."

In the UK, Christopher Ede, producer of the landmark performances of the Chester mystery plays during the Festival of Britain, directed Noye's Fludde in Winchester Cathedral, 12–14 July 1960. (Note: Ede had been in touch with Britten the preceding year, not only about this production but also discussing Britten's Fanfare for St Edmundsbury which he had commissioned for the Pageant of Magna Carta. Ede's wife, Joy Boughton, was an oboist with the English Opera Group, whose playing was much admired by Britten.) Writing to Ede on 19 December 1959, Britten urged him to keep the staging of Noye's Fludde simple rather than elaborate. In 1971 the Aldeburgh Festival once again staged Noye's Fludde at Orford; a full television broadcast of the production, transferred to Snape Maltings, was made by the BBC, conducted by Steuart Bedford under the composer's supervision, with Brannigan resuming the role of Noah, Sheila Rex as his wife, and Lumsden as the Voice of God.

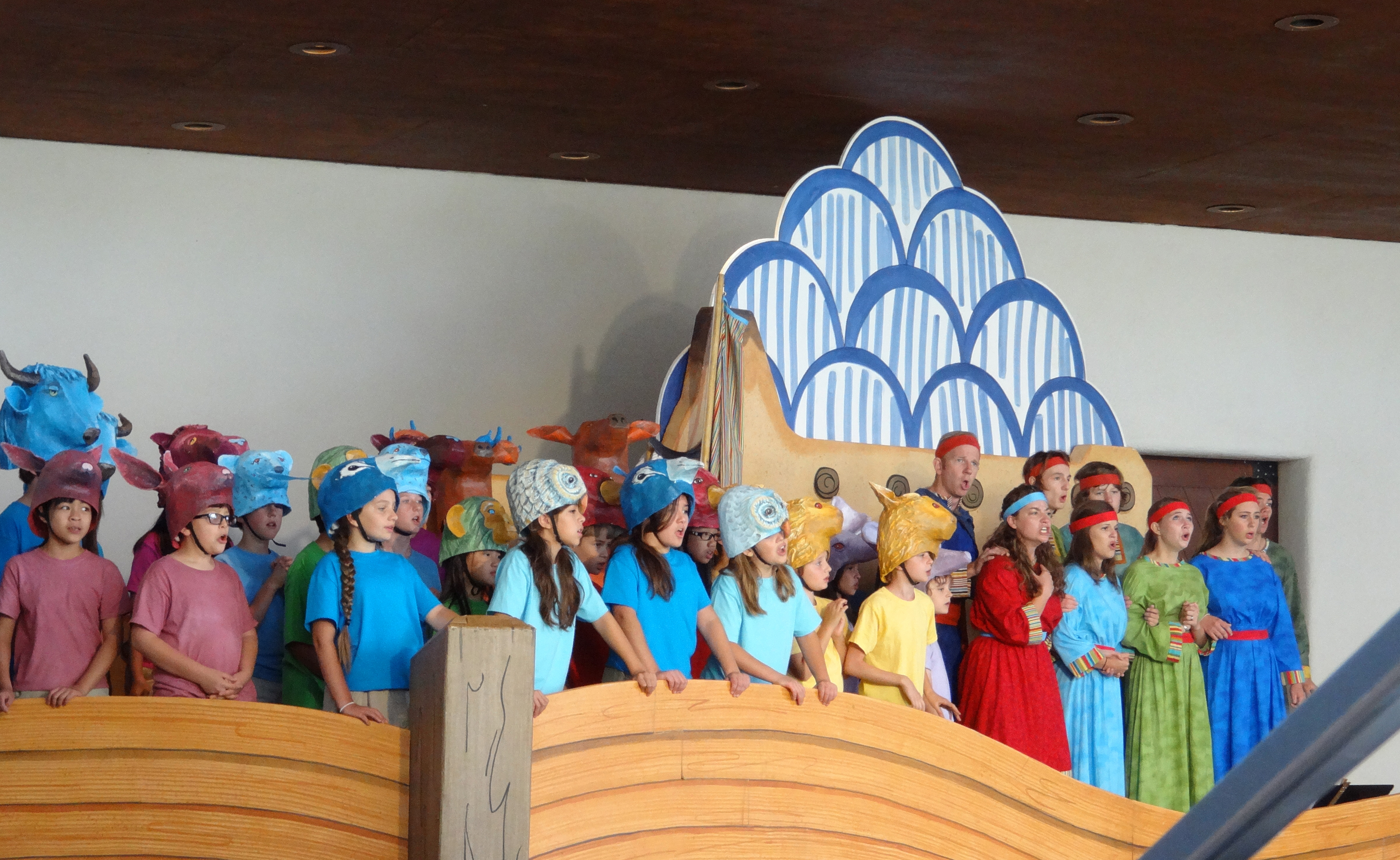
Noye's Fludde: special performance in a rehearsal hall at the Santa Fe Opera, 11 August 2013

In 1972 Jonathan Miller directed his first opera with a production of Noye's Fludde, staged during 21–23 December at the Roundhouse Theatre, London. The adult roles were taken by Michael Williams (God), Bryan Drake (Noah) and Isabelle Lucas (Mrs Noah), and the conductor was John Lubbock.

Among less conventional productions, in September 2005 Noye's Fludde was performed at the Nuremberg zoo, in a production by the Internationales Kammermusikfestival Nürnberg involving around 180 children from Nuremberg and from England, directed by Nina Kühner, conducted by Peter Selwyn. A subsequent zoo production was presented in Belfast, Northern Ireland, by NI Opera and the KT Wong Foundation. The performance was directed by Oliver Mears and conducted by Nicholas Chalmers, with Paul Carey Jones as Noye and Doreen Curran as Mrs Noye. The same production was performed in China, in October 2012, at the Beijing Music Festival, this being the Chinese premiere of the work, and the first full performance of a Britten opera in China. It was performed again at the Shanghai Music In The Summer Air (MISA) Festival in July 2013.

Britten's centenary year 2013 prompted numerous performances across the UK, including at Tewkesbury Abbey during the Cheltenham Music Festival, and the Thaxted Festival where 120 local children appeared as the animals. An Aldeburgh Festival production as a finale to the centenary year was staged in November, on the eve of Britten's 100th birthday anniversary, in his home town of Lowestoft. Andrew Shore appeared as Noye, and Felicity Palmer as Mrs Noye. It was directed by Martin Duncan and broadcast in the UK on BBC Radio 3 on 24 November. Outside the UK, several professional companies mounted centenary year productions involving local children, including the Santa Fe Opera, and the New Orleans Opera which mounted its first production of any Britten opera.

== Music ==
The approach to the ancient story of Noah through an essentially medieval convention, realized in Elizabethan language of a fairly lowly order, was a splendid formula for arousing children's sense of the fitting ... Whereas the church parables were to couch their most overtly spiritual sentiments in terms of ... Gregorian plainchant, his children in Noye's Fludde most effortlessly recognize an act of praise as their own when couched in terms to which their conditioning has accustomed them – that is, ... universally familiar English hymnody.

— Peter Evans: The Music of Benjamin Britten

Noye's Fludde has been described by the musicologist Arnold Whittall as a forerunner of Britten's church parables of the 1960s, and by the composer's biographer Paul Kildea as a hybrid work, "as much a cantata as an opera". Most of the orchestral writing, says the music analyst Eric Roseberry, lies "well within the range of intelligent young players of very restricted technique". Several episodes of the opera – such as "the grinding conflict of Britten's passacaglia theme against Dykes's familiar hymn-tune in the storm" – introduces listeners and the youthful performers to what Roseberry terms "a contemporary idiom of dissonance", in contrast to the "outworn style" of most music written for the young. With its innovatory arrangement of vocal and instrumental forces, Noye's Fludde is summarised by Whittall as "a brilliant demonstration of how to combine the relatively elementary instrumental and vocal skills of amateurs with professionals to produce a highly effective piece of music theatre."

The opera begins with a short, "strenuous" instrumental prelude, which forms the basis of the musical accompaniment to the opening congregational hymn; its first phrase is founded on a descending bass E-B-F, itself to become an important motif. (Note: Peter Evans further notes how Britten, by substituting the expected tonic Es with F naturals, "buffeted by the explosive splash of the tam-tam, plunge[s] us into the flood where we expect firm ground".) Humphrey Carpenter notes that throughout the hymn the bass line is out of step with the singing, an effect which, he says, "suggests an adult world where purity is unattainable". Following the hymn, the Voice of God is accompanied, as it is in all his pre-flood warnings and declamations, by the E-B-F notes from the opera's opening bass line, sounded on the timpani. (Note: In a moment which recalls Canticle II, Britten has God's instructions for the dimensions of the ark spoken in unison by God and Noye, with Noye's voice breaking free as he completes the ark's description. Similarly, in the earlier work, God's instruction to Abraham is sung by the tenor and alto soloists combined, Abraham's voice – sung by the tenor – then emerging solo as he prepares to execute God's will.) After Noye's response in recitative, the next musical episode is the entry of Noye's children and their wives, a passage which, Carpenter suggests, replaces the pessimism of the adult word with "the blissful optimism of childhood". The syncopated tune of the children's song is derived from the final line of Noye's recitative: "As God has bidden us doe".

Mrs Noye and her Gossips enter to an F sharp minor distortion of the children's tune, which reflects their mocking attitude. In Noye's song calling for the ark to be built, a flood leitmotiv derived from the first line of the opening hymn recurs as a solemn refrain. The music which accompanies the construction work heavily involves the children's orchestra, and includes recorder trills, pizzicato open strings, and the tapping of oriental temple-blocks. After the brief "quarrel" duet between Noye and his wife in 6/8 time, timpani-led percussion heralds the Voice of God's order to fill the ark. Bugle fanfares announce the arrival of the animals, who march into the ark to a "jauntily innocent" tune in which Roseberry detects the spirit of Mahler; the fanfares punctuate the entire march. The birds are the last group to enter the ark, to the accompaniment of a three-part canon sung by Noye's children and their wives. In the final scene before the storm, where Noye and his family try to persuade Mrs Noye to join them in the ark in G major, the music expresses Mrs Noye's obstinacy by having her reply accompanied by a D sharp pedal which prepares for the Gossips' drinking scherzo in E minor. The slap which Mrs Noye administers when finally persuaded is accompanied by an E major fortissimo.

The storm scene which forms the centre of the opera is an extended passacaglia, the theme of which uses the entire chromatic scale. (Note: Arnold Whittall and Philip Brett, among others, have noted that the passacaglia theme features all 12 notes. Peter Evans has cautioned against seeing this as a 12-tone row (as is the theme from The Turn of the Screw) since the theme totals 19 notes whose "moorings round C are ... very secure". He suggests its chromaticism both suggests "the serpentine creeping onward of the waters", and also creates a context, within the opera's otherwise straight-forward tonality, in which Dykes's chromatic hymn "will not appear ludicrously incongruous".) In a long instrumental introduction, full rein is given to the various elements of the children's orchestra. Slung mugs struck with a wooden spoon give the sound of the first raindrops. Trills in the recorders represent the wind, strings impersonate waves, while piano chords outline the flood leitmotiv. The sound builds to a peak with thunder and lightning from the percussion. When "Eternal Father" is sung at the climax of the storm, the passacaglia theme provides the bass line for the hymn. After the hymn, the minor-key fury of the passacaglia gradually subsides, resolving into what Roseberry describes as "a dewy, pastoral F major" akin to that of the finale of Beethoven's Pastoral Symphony. Noye's reappearance is followed by the brief waltzes for the Raven, accompanied by solo cello, and the Dove, the latter a flutter-tongued recorder solo the melody of which is reversed when the Dove returns.

Following God's instruction, the people and animals leave the ark singing a thankful chorus of Alleluias with more bugle fanfares in B flat. The appearance of the rainbow is accompanied by handbell chimes, a sound which dominates the final stages of the work. In the final canonical hymn, the main tune moves from F major to G major and is sung over reiterated bugle calls, joined by the handbells. In the third verse, the organ provides a brief discordant intervention, "the one jarring note in Noye's Fludde" according to the musicologist Peter Evans. Graham Elliott believes that this may be a musical joke in which Britten pokes gentle fun at the habits of some church organists. The mingled chimes of slung mugs and bells continue during God's final valedictory blessing. As Noye leaves, the full orchestra provides a final fortissimo salute, the opera then concluding peacefully with B flat chimes of handbells alternating with extended G major string chords – "a hauntingly beautiful close", says Roseberry.

== Publication ==
Several of the opera's novel features, including the use of a large amateur orchestra, and specifically its use of handbells, posed problems for Britten's publishers, Boosey & Hawkes. Ernst Roth made enquiries about the availability of handbells to the firm Mears & Stainbank (the bell foundry based in Whitechapel, London), and then wrote to Britten urging him to prepare an alternative, simplified version of Noye's Fludde for publication, since the rarity of handbells in the scale of E flat made the original score, in his view, impractical. (Note: When writing the music for the local amateur handbell ensemble to play, Britten had been unaware that the set of bells used were cast specially for Aldeburgh Parish Church in E flat, rather than the customary key of C, so ringers might learn the peals of the church tower bells which are pitched in that key.) Britten resisted such a proposal: "I think if you consider a performance of this work in a big church with about fifty or more children singing, you will agree that the orchestra would sound totally inadequate if it were only piano duet, a few strings and a drum or two." Britten suggested, rather, that Boosey & Hawkes should invest in a set of E flat handbells to hire for performances; or, that the handbells music could be simply cued in the piano duet part.

After the score had been published, and in the face of an imminent performance in Ettal, Britten suggested that he could attempt to rewrite the music for a handbell ensemble in D, since sets in that key were more common than in E flat. Britten never prepared this alternative version for reduced instrumentation. He did agree, however, to make the published full score "less bulky" by presenting the amateur forces of recorders, ripieno strings and percussion in the form of short score, on the understanding that full scores for those groups would be available to hire for rehearsal and performance purposes. The full score was published in 1958, and the vocal score, prepared by Imogen Holst (with the libretto translated into German by Prince Ludwig of Hesse and the Rhine under the pseudonym Ludwig Landgraf), was published in 1959.

== Recordings ==
| Year | Cast: Noye (Noah), Mrs. Noye, Voice of God | Conductor, Ensemble(s) Choruses and Orchestra | Label |
|---|---|---|---|
| 1961 | Owen Brannigan; Sheila Rex; Trevor Anthony | Norman Del Mar, English Opera Group Orchestra, East Suffolk Children's Chorus and Orchestra | LP: Argo ZNF 1 CD: Decca 4363972. Also contains Britten's The Golden Vanity |
| 1989 | Donald Maxwell (baritone); Linda Ormiston; Richard Pasco | Richard Hickox, Coull Quartet, Endymion Ensemble, Salisbury and Chester Schools' Chorus and Orchestra. | CD: Virgin Classics VC7 91129-2. Also contains Britten's Serenade for tenor, horn, and strings CD: EMI Composer Boxes 2175262 (The Collector's Edition, 37 discs) |
| 2007 | David Wilson-Johnson; Catherine Wyn-Rogers; Benjamin Luxon | Nicholas Wilks, Members of the BBC Concert Orchestra, Finchley Children's Music Group. | CD: Somm Recordings SOMM 212. Also contains Britten's Ceremony of Carols |

== Notes and references ==
Notes

Sources

- Barnes, Jennifer (2003). Television Opera: The Fall of Opera Commissioned for Television. Woodbridge: Boydell Press. ISBN 978-0-85115-912-6.
- Bridcut, John (2006). Britten's Children. London: Faber and Faber. ISBN 0-571-22839-9.
- Britten, Benjamin (2004). Mitchell, Donald; Reed, Philip; Cooke, Mervyn (eds.). Letters from a Life: The Selected Letters of Benjamin Britten, Volume III, 1946–1951. London: Faber and Faber. ISBN 0-571-22282-X.
- Britten, Benjamin (2008). Reed, Philip; Cooke, Mervyn; Mitchell, Donald (eds.). Letters from a Life: The Selected Letters of Benjamin Britten, Volume IV, 1952–1957. Woodbridge: The Boydell Press. ISBN 978-1-84383-382-6.
- Britten, Benjamin (2010). Reed, Philip; Cooke, Mervyn (eds.). Letters from a Life: The Selected Letters of Benjamin Britten, Volume V, 1958–1965. Woodbridge: The Boydell Press. ISBN 978-1-84383-591-2.
- Britten, Benjamin (2012). Reed, Philip; Cooke, Mervyn (eds.). Letters from a Life: The Selected Letters of Benjamin Britten, Volume VI, 1966–1976. Woodbridge: The Boydell Press. ISBN 978-1-84383-725-1.
- Carpenter, Humphrey (1992). Benjamin Britten: A Biography. London: Faber and Faber. ISBN 0-571-14325-3.
- Elliott, Graham (2006). Benjamin Britten: The Spiritual Dimension. Oxford: Oxford University Press. ISBN 0-19-816258-8.
- Evans, Peter (1996). The Music of Benjamin Britten. Oxford: Oxford University Press. ISBN 0-19-816590-0.
- Graham, Colin (1989). "Staging first productions 3". In Herbert, David (ed.). The Operas of Benjamin Britten. Huntingdon, Cambridgeshire: Herbert Press. ISBN 1-871569-08-7.
- Happe, Peter, ed. (1985). English Mystery Plays: A Selection. London: Penguin Books. ISBN 978-0-14-192193-8. (ebook version, unpaginated)
- Kennedy, Michael (1981). Britten. The Master Musicians. London: Dent. ISBN 0-460-02201-6.
- Kennedy, Michael (2001). "Benjamin Britten". In Holden, Amanda (ed.). The New Penguin Opera Guide. New York: Penguin Putnam. ISBN 0-14-029312-4.
- Kildea, Paul (2013). Benjamin Britten: A Life in the Twentieth Century. London: Penguin Books. ISBN 978-1-84614-233-8.
- Matthews, David (2013). Britten. London: Haus Publishing. ISBN 978-1-908323-38-5.
- Normington, Katie (2007). Modern Mysteries: Contemporary Productions of Medieval English Cycle Dramas. Cambridge: D. S. Brewer. ISBN 978-1-84384-128-9.
- Oliver, Michael (1996). Benjamin Britten. London: Phaidon. ISBN 0-7148-3277-4.
- Palmer, Christopher, ed. (1984). The Britten Companion. London: Faber & Faber. ISBN 0-571-13147-6.
- Roseberry, Eric (Autumn 1958). "The Music of Noye's Fludde". Tempo. New Series (49). Cambridge University Press: 2–11, 18–19. doi:10.1017/S0040298200044788. JSTOR 942970. S2CID 143824184.
- Thacker, A.T.; Lewis, Christopher, eds. (2003). A History of the County of Chester: Volume 5 part 2: The City of Chester: Culture, Buildings, Institutions. Woodbridge, Suffolk: Boydell and Brewer. ISBN 978-1-904356-03-5.
- White, Eric Walter (1983). Benjamin Britten: His Life and Operas. London: Faber and Faber. ISBN 0-571-18066-3.
- Whittall, Arnold (1982). The Music of Britten and Tippett. Cambridge: Cambridge University Press. ISBN 0-521-23523-5.
- Whittall, Arnold (1998). "Noye's Fludde". In Stanley Sadie (ed.). The New Grove Dictionary of Opera. Vol. 3. London: Macmillan Publishers. p. 631. ISBN 1-56159-228-5.
- Woolf, Rosemary (1980). The English Mystery Plays. Berkeley and Los Angeles: University of California Press. ISBN 0-520-04081-3.
