= Owen Wingrave =

1970 opera by Benjamin Britten

- Opera by Benjamin Britten
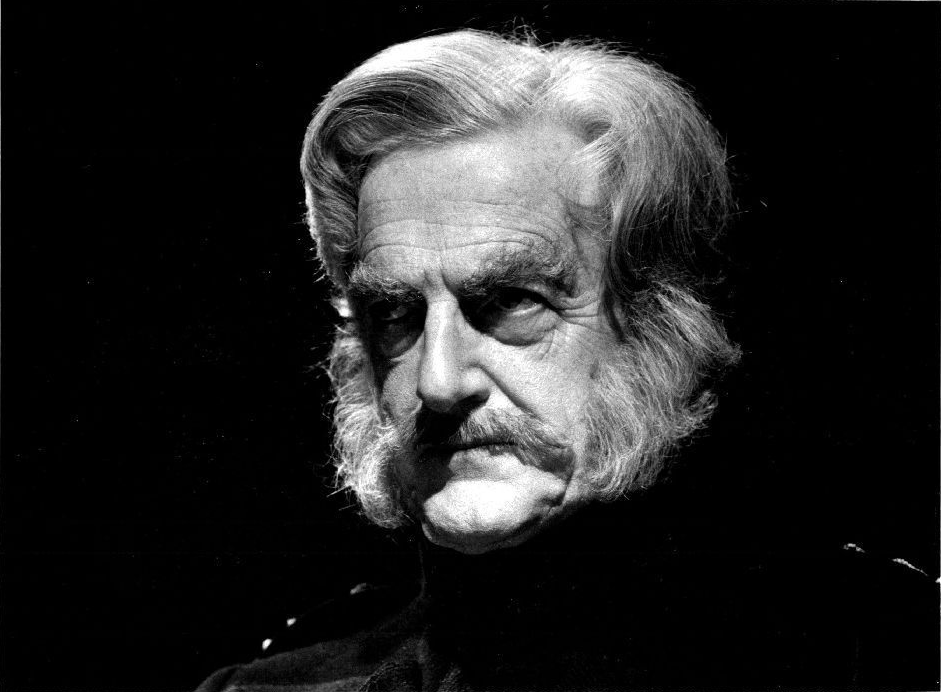
- Peter Pears in the role of General Sir Philip Wingrave
- Librettist: Myfanwy Piper
- Language: English
- Based on: short story by Henry James
- Premiere: 16 May 1971 broadcast, recorded at Snape Maltings, near Aldeburgh

Owen Wingrave, Op. 85, is an opera in two acts with music by Benjamin Britten and libretto by Myfanwy Piper, after a short story by Henry James. It was originally written for televised performance.

Britten had been aware of the story since his work with Piper on his previous opera modelled after a James work, The Turn of the Screw in 1954. BBC television commissioned an opera for television from him in 1966 and, in 1968, he and Piper began work on the libretto. The work was completed by August 1970.

The premiere was recorded at Snape Maltings in November 1970 and first broadcast on BBC2 on 16 May 1971. The music is influenced by Britten's interest in twelve-tone serialist techniques. A large tuned percussion section anticipates the musical treatment of his next (and last) opera, Death in Venice. In addition to its being an expression of Britten's own pacifism, he was reported as saying that this opera was partly a response to the Vietnam War.

The costumes were designed by Charles Knode, who also designed some of the costumes for Death in Venice.

Britten had never owned a television at that time. It has been reported that he hated television and never owned a set at all. This is not strictly true. Perhaps he would have never purchased a set himself, but he was given one by Decca for his 60th birthday in November 1973.

== Performance history ==
Britten originally intended the work for both television and the stage, although after the stage premiere on 10 May 1973 at the Royal Opera House, Covent Garden, it has rarely been seen in either medium. The US premiere of the opera was at the Santa Fe Opera in 1973, with Colin Graham directing the production.

It was seen at Glyndebourne in 1997, following performances by Glyndebourne Touring Opera in 1995. A new production by The Royal Opera opened in April 2007 in the Linbury Studio Theatre, with a reduced orchestration by David Matthews. It was performed in May 2009 at the Chicago Opera Theater as well as the Wiener Kammeroper in Vienna directed by Nicola Raab with English baritone Andrew Ashwin in the title role. A new production was presented in January 2010 by Opera Frankfurt and directed by Walter Sutcliffe. Opera Trionfo (Netherlands) presented the opera in 2013 directed by Floris Visser and conducted by Ed Spanjaard and a planned reprise in 2014. Visser also directed the opera at Theater Osnabrück in Germany; this production premiered on 16 January 2016 under the baton of Daniel Inbal.

In September 2020, during the COVID-19 pandemic, Grange Park Opera produced a video version of the opera as part of its 2020 "Interim Season", directed by Stephen Medcalf, with the setting moved from the Edwardian period to the 1950s.

== Roles ==
Role	Voice type	Premiere cast, 16 May 1971 (Conductor: Benjamin Britten)
Owen Wingrave	Baritone	Benjamin Luxon
Spencer Coyle	Bass-baritone	John Shirley-Quirk
Lechmere	Tenor	Nigel Douglas
Miss Wingrave	Dramatic soprano	Sylvia Fisher
Mrs Coyle	Soprano	Heather Harper
Mrs Julian	Soprano	Jennifer Vyvyan
Kate Julian	Mezzo-soprano	Janet Baker
General Sir Philip Wingrave	Tenor	Peter Pears
Narrator	Tenor	Peter Pears
Chorus

== Synopsis ==
Time: Late 19th century
Place:

=== Act 1 ===
Prelude

Depiction of the Wingrave family portraits at Paramore, the Wingraves' ancestral home.

Scene 1

At Coyle's military "cramming establishment" in Bayswater, Coyle is instructing Owen Wingrave and Lechmere on war and command in battle. Owen tells Coyle of his disdain for war, which is contrary to the family history of the Wingraves as soldiers. Coyle replies that Owen must change his attitude, and warns him that his family will disapprove. Owen stands by his words. Alone, Coyle wonders how he shall tell this news to Owen's family.

Scene 2

The scene cross-cuts between Hyde Park and Miss Wingrave's London residence. In Hyde Park, Owen muses to himself that he is strong, not weak, in his disdain for war. At Miss Wingrave's lodgings, she and Coyle discuss Owen. Miss Wingrave asserts that Owen will change his mind once he returns to his family at Paramore.

Scene 3

Back at Coyle's establishment, Lechmere, Coyle and Mrs Coyle talk about what they feel to be Owen's "strange ideas" about soldiering and war. Lechmere says that he will help to "bring him round". Owen overhears this and emphasises that he will not be brought round. Coyle tells Owen that he is to return to Paramore. Owen recalls his grandfather's love of war, his father's death in battle and his own mother's death with a stillborn brother.

Scene 4

At Paramore, Mrs Julian, her daughter Kate and Miss Wingrave await Owen's arrival, themselves distressed by the news of Owen, and determined to bring him back into the Wingrave traditions. They leave the ancestral hall where the portraits of the Wingrave ancestors hang, so that Owen arrives to no greeting from his family or loved ones, but only from the portraits. One by one, Mrs. Julian, Kate and Miss Wingrave enter the hall and denounce Owen. Owen tries to respond, but finds no support. He then goes to meet his grandfather, Sir Philip.

Scene 5

Over the space of a week, Sir Philip, Kate, Miss Wingrave and Mrs Julian continually express their contempt for Owen. Mrs Julian finally tells Owen that he is "not worthy of Paramore".

Scene 6

The Coyles have arrived at Paramore. Mrs. Coyle is shocked at the treatment of Owen by his own family. Coyle himself confesses unease, and hints about ghosts in the house, of past Wingrave ancestors. Owen greets the Coyles warmly, with Lechmere also present. When Coyle points out that Owen has brought this trouble upon himself, Owen replies that Coyle taught him to "use my mind" and to understand war "too well". Coyle reveals that he has not visited on a friendly call, but rather to try to persuade Owen to renounce his new thinking. Coyle ironically notes that Owen is "a fighter", in spite of his new pacifism.

Scene 7

The entire Wingrave family, with the Coyles and Lechmere, are at dinner. Sir Philip and Miss Wingrave demand Owen's obedience to the family tradition. Mrs. Coyle is most sympathetic to Owen of the characters, and mentions that Owen does have "scruples". The Wingraves, Kate and Mrs. Julian ridicule Owen's "scruples". At the end of the scene, Owen angrily states that he would make war a crime.

=== Act 2 ===
Prologue

A ballad singer sings of a past family episode when one of the Wingrave boys did not fight another boy when challenged. The father took his son into a room, struck him and killed him. Later, the father was found dead in that same room, "without a wound".

Scene 1

Owen and Coyle are in the ancestral hall at Paramore, recalling this story and walking by the same room where the two deaths had occurred. Kate still cannot accept Owen's assertions. Sir Philip demands a private meeting with Owen. Coyle notices the similarity between Sir Philip and the old man of the story, and between Owen and the boy. Owen emerges from the meeting with Sir Philip to state that he has been disinherited. Mrs Julian cries at this news, and reveals that she had hoped that Kate and Owen would be married to be able to preserve their social status. Lechmere then steps in to offer himself to Kate. Kate momentarily encourages him, and asks Lechmere if he would even sleep in the "haunted room" for her sake. Lechmere says that he would. Owen makes a motion to light the ladies' candles, but Miss Wingrave deliberately snubs him and turns to Lechmere for this task.

Left alone after Coyle has said goodnight, Owen soliloquises in the ancestral hall that he has found his strength in peace rather than war. Kate comes back into the hall, at first unaware of Owen's presence. They sing a duet of their earlier life. Kate's distress at Owen's pacifist thinking resurfaces. When she mentions Lechmere, Owen scolds her for her flirtation with him. Kate replies that Owen is a coward, which causes Owen's anger to flare more strongly. He replies that he is no coward, and she demands proof. After he asks her what proof she wants, she asks that he sleep in the "haunted room". Owen initially refuses, but after one last taunting remark from Kate, Owen agrees, and even says that she can lock him in the room.

Scene 2

The scene begins in the Coyles' bedroom, where Mrs. Coyle is reflecting on Lechmere's flirtatious behaviour and Kate's headstrongness. Coyle noted that earlier in the evening, Owen seemed "resigned" and "at peace".

Later, Lechmere, unable to sleep, visits Coyle. He tells Coyle that he heard Kate's taunting of Owen to sleep in the "haunted room". Mrs Coyle expresses concern for Owen's safety, but Coyle finds a grim satisfaction in that this act will prove the Wingrave family wrong about Owen. Just as Coyle is about to check on Owen, Kate cries from outside the "haunted room". The Coyles and Lechmere rush to her, joined soon by Mrs Julian and Miss Wingrave. Kate now regrets her challenge to Owen, but it is too late: when Sir Philip appears and opens the door to the room, they see Owen dead, lying on the floor.

The opera closes with the ballad singer intoning the steadfastness of the Wingrave boy against his foe.

== Recordings ==
- 1971: The original commercial recording of the opera is the Decca recording with the same cast, chorus and orchestra as in the first performance.
- 2005: DVD recording of a newer TV production on Kultur, with the setting updated to the 1950s at the time of the Suez crisis. The cast credits are as follows: Gerald Finley (Owen Wingrave), Charlotte Hellekant (Kate), Peter Savidge (Coyle), Hilton Marlton (Lechmere), Josephine Barstow (Miss Wingrave), Anne Dawson (Mrs Coyle), Elizabeth Gale (Mrs Julian), Martyn Hill (General Sir Philip Wingrave); Deutsches Symphonie-Orchester Berlin; Kent Nagano, conductor; Margaret Williams, director.
- 2008: Chandos CHAN 10473(2); Peter Coleman-Wright (Owen Wingrave), Pamela Helen Stephen (Kate), Alan Opie (Coyle), James Gilchrist (Lechmere), Elizabeth Connell (Miss Wingrave), Janice Watson (Mrs Coyle), Sarah Fox (Mrs Julian), Robin Leggate (General Sir Philip Wingrave and Narrator); Tiffin Boys Choir; City of London Sinfonia; Richard Hickox, conductor.

Source: Recordings of Owen Wingrave on operadis-opera-discography.org.uk
