= Nicholas Chalmers =

English conductor

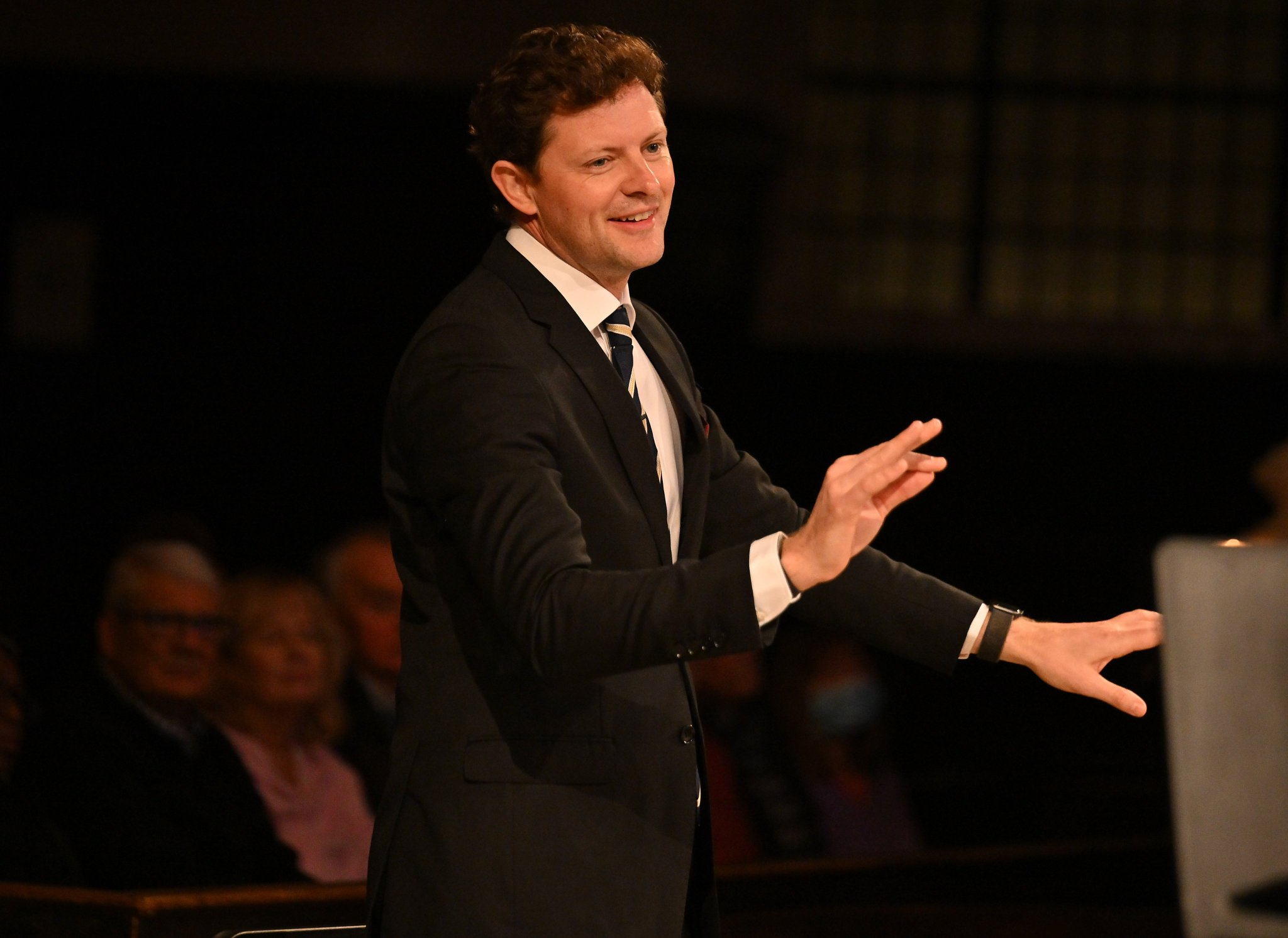
Nicholas Chalmers conducting the BBC Singers at St Martin In The Fields, 17 November 2023

Nicholas Chalmers (born 1977, Hammersmith) is an English conductor, and former artistic director of Nevill Holt Opera, a role he held from 2012 to 2023. Since 2023 he has been principal conductor of the National Youth Choir's 18-25 group, and an associate conductor of the BBC Singers.

== Biography ==
Chalmers was born in west London to musical parents, and sang as a chorister while attending Tewkesbury Abbey School. At the University of Oxford, he continued as a music student, before continuing to study conducting at Conservatorio di Musica di Piacenza. Initially his principal focus was church music. He held an organ scholarship at Chichester Cathedral, and went on to become assistant organist and Director of Music of the Choir School at Westminster Abbey between 2003 and 2008. He also became Organist and Director of Music at St Jude's Church, Hampstead Garden Suburb in 2003, celebrating twenty years in the role in 2023.

An interest in stage performance led Chalmers to found a performance company in 2004, Second Movement, together with a university friend Oliver Mears and Abigail Toland. From 2008 until 2011 Chalmers was assistant chorus master of English National Opera, preparing opera repertoire alongside then-music director Edward Gardner, and guest conductors including Mark Wigglesworth and Sir Charles Mackerras. From 2010 he also began conducting operatic performances at Northern Ireland Opera in Belfast and other locations.

In 2012, Chalmers was engaged by David Ross of Carphone Warehouse to found an opera company at Nevill Holt Hall. The Nevill Holt Opera company began performances in 2013. Under Chalmers' direction, the company opened a new 400-seat theatre on the site in 2018, and gave an award-winning outdoor production of Britten’s Noye’s Fludde in 2017. Chalmers held the role of music director of the company until his resignation in 2023, citing a desire to move on to new challenges. His resignation coincided with the company's announcement that it would cut back its 2023 programme due to insufficient ticket sales. In his resignation statement, Chalmers clarified that although he had played no part in the decision to make cutbacks, the decision was separate from his resignation. The opera company rebranded itself as the Nevill Holt Festival in 2024.

Chalmers made his BBC Proms conducting debut in 2020 with the BBC Singers. This was followed by further broadcasts and concerts with the group, including developing a relationship between the choir and youth choral groups in Stratford East. He was appointed as the BBC Singers' associate conductor for learning in June 2023. This was followed by an appointment in September 2023 as Principal Conductor of the National Youth Choir's 18-25 year group, taking over from Ben Parry.

Chalmers is a Senior Associate Artist of the Royal Opera House, where he will make his conducting debut in autumn 2024. He is scheduled to take up the role of Fernside Chair of Choral Conducting at The Royal Academy of Music from September 2024.
