= Sarka =

Sarka سرکا
- Village
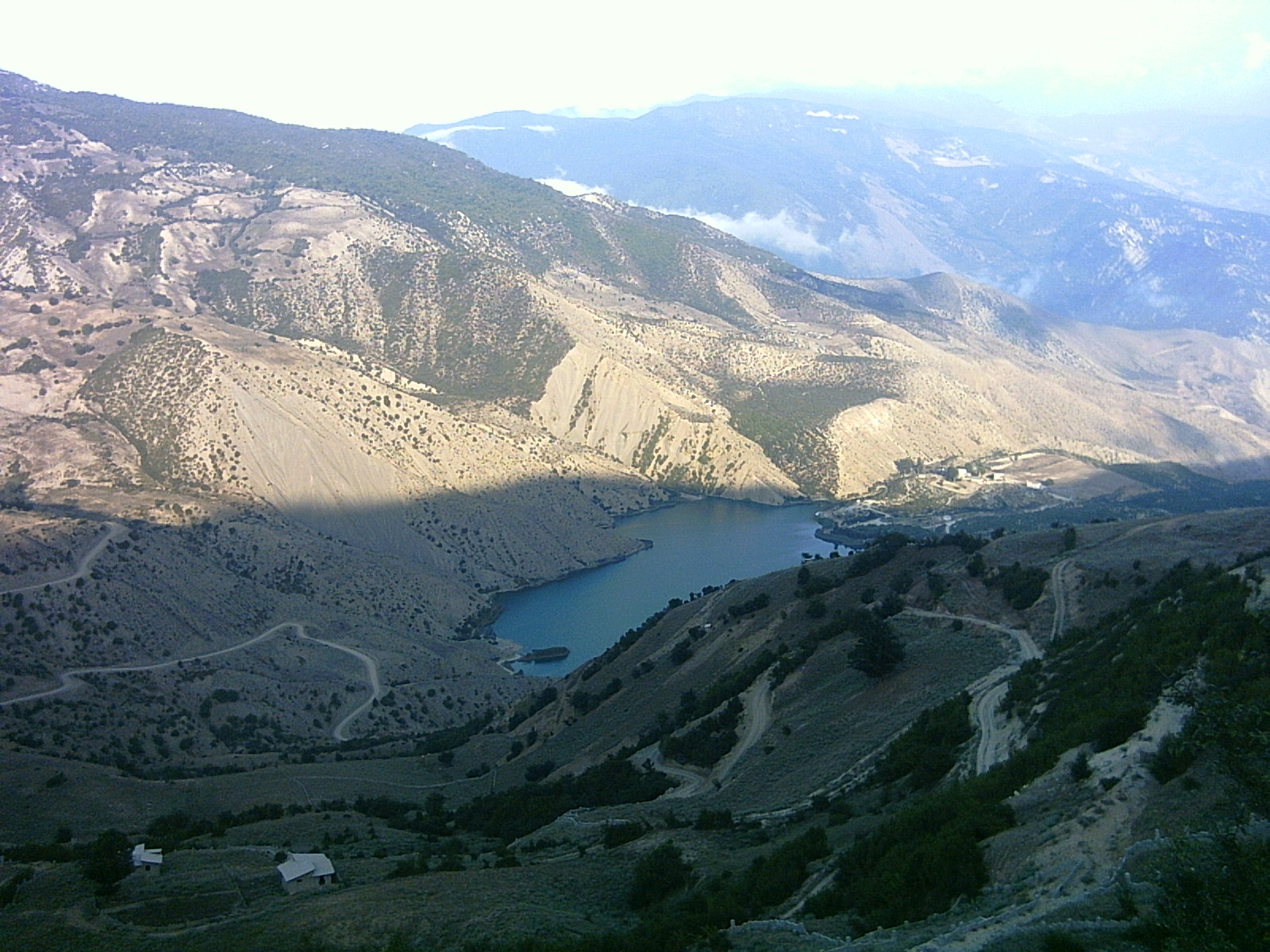

- Location within Iran
- Coordinates: 36.54664°N 51.26606°E
- Country: Iran
- Province: Mazandaran
- County: Chalus
- Bakhsh: Marzan Abad
- Rural District: Birun Bashm

Area
  - Total: 4 km^{2} (1.5 sq mi)
- Elevation: 1,500 m (4,900 ft)

Population (2016)
  - Total: 63
  - Density: 16/km^{2} (41/sq mi)
- Time zone: UTC+3:30 (IRST)

Sarka (Persian: سركا, also Romanized as Sarkā; also known as Sarkā’) is a village in Birun Bashm Rural District, Marzanabad District, Chalus County, Mazandaran Province, Iran. At the 2016 census, its population was 63, in 24 families. Decreased from 119 people in 2006.

Sarka village mosque is located in the central area of the village at coordinates 36.54842, 51.26394

Sarka`s Mosque

Sarka village has the cemetery located in the northern part of the village at coordinates 36.55010, 51.26378

Sarka cemetery
