= Jesús León =

Jesus Leon
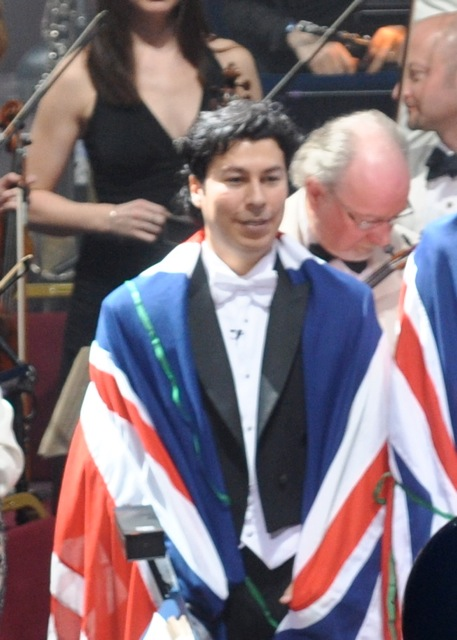
- Jesús León at Royal Albert Hall, March 21, 2009

Background information
- Born: Hermosillo, Sonora, Mexico
- Genres: Opera
- Occupation: (tenor)
- Instruments: voice, guitar, piano
- Label: Opus Arte
- Website: www.jesusleon.com

Mexican tenor Jesús León is an operatic tenor specializing in the bel canto and French lyric repertoire. He has appeared in leading roles at opera houses and festivals in Europe, North America, the Middle East, and Asia. León studied at the UCLA Opera Studio, the Solti Accademia di Bel Canto, the Boston University Opera Institute, and the Domingo–Thornton Young Artist Program at Los Angeles Opera. He later continued his training in Italy under the guidance of soprano Mirella Freni, who awarded him the Nicolai Ghiaurov Scholarship.

Based in Vienna, León maintains an international career as both an opera and concert performer.

== Early years ==
Jesús León began his musical studies at the age of ten with guitar lessons and later studied voice at the Casa de la Cultura of Sonora. During his teenage years, he performed in popular music ensembles while developing his interest in classical singing.

In 1996, León began formal operatic studies at the University of Sonora, where he sang as a tenor soloist with the university choir and participated in regional music festivals, including the Festival Alfonso Ortiz Tirado. He also appeared in theatrical productions and early operatic performances during this period.

Between 1998 and 2004, León performed as a tenor and pianist in sacred music ensembles and founded the vocal ensemble Cantiquo, with which he presented concerts in Mexico. These early experiences contributed to his transition toward an international operatic career.

== Opera career ==
León’s operatic career has included appearances at major opera houses and festivals worldwide, with a repertoire focused on bel canto and French lyric roles. His stage appearances include Elvino in La sonnambula, Edgardo in Lucia di Lammermoor, Roméo in Roméo et Juliette, Alfredo in La traviata, Arnold in Guillaume Tell, Tonio in La fille du régiment, the Duke of Mantua in Rigoletto, Nadir in Les pêcheurs de perles, Ernesto in Don Pasquale, and Hoffmann in Les contes d’Hoffmann.

Between 2016 and 2018, León appeared as Nadir in Les pêcheurs de perles at Opera di Firenze, Teatro Verdi di Trieste, and the Seoul Arts Centre; as Roméo in Roméo et Juliette at the Royal Opera House Muscat; and as Elvino in La sonnambula at Teatro Filarmonico di Verona. He also sang the Duke of Mantua at Opéra de Nice and Ismaele in Nabucco at Opéra de Nice and Opéra de Toulon.

During the 2017–2018 season, León appeared as Edgardo in Lucia di Lammermoor with Florida Grand Opera, Elvino at the Staatsoper Stuttgart, and Roméo at Oper im Steinbruch. He also participated in concert performances at Dubai Opera and appeared regularly with the Royal Philharmonic Orchestra at the Royal Albert Hall.

In the 2018–2019 season, he performed Elvino and Edgardo at Deutsche Oper Berlin, Alfredo at Minnesota Opera, Roméo at Graz Opera, and Hoffmann in Les contes d’Hoffmann at the Palacio de Bellas Artes in Mexico City.

In the 2021–2022 season, León made his debut at the Opéra-Comique in Paris as Roméo in Roméo et Juliette. He also portrayed Hernán Cortés in Montezuma by Carl Heinrich Graun at the Palacio de Bellas Artes and appeared in multiple concerts with the Royal Philharmonic Orchestra at the Royal Albert Hall. He later appeared as Arnold in Guillaume Tell with Irish National Opera.

In December 2024, León performed the role of Tonio in Donizetti’s La fille du régiment at the Klaipėda State Musical Theatre in Lithuania.

== Discography (CD) ==
- Passione (2024), with the Royal Liverpool Philharmonic Orchestra, conducted by Toby Purser. Released by Rubicon Classics.
- His debut recording Bel Canto with Royal Liverpool Philharmonic Orchestra conducted by Toby Purser, including arias by Vincenzo Bellini, Gaetano Donizetti and Giuseppe Verdi, was released in April 2015 by Opus Arte.
- Respira - Jesús León, Tenor (Selection of Mexican and Italian songs) various composers.

== Awards & Grants ==
- 2020 - Winner of the Vienna International Music Competition. His award-winning concert took place same year at the Wiener Konzerthaus.
- 2009 - Festival Ortiz Tirado,
- 2007 - Grants from Jose Iturbi Foundation,
- 2007 - The Vilcek Foundation,
- 2006 - The Nando Peretti Foundation,
- 2006 - The Solti Foundation,
- 2005 - The Palm Springs Opera Guild
- 2005 - The American Institute of Fine Arts
- 2004 - The Opera Buffs Inc. of Los Angeles.

=== Complete Repertoire ===
Year of Debut	#	Title	Composer	Role	Opera house	Location
2004	1	L’elisir d’amore (The Elixir of love)	Gaetano Donizetti	Nemorino	Auditorio Civico del Estado	Hermosillo, Sonora
2005	2	La Traviata	Giuseppe Verdi	Alfredo	Palm Springs Opera Guild	Palm Springs, California
	3	Gianni Schicchi	Giacomo Puccini	Rinuccio	Boston Opera Institute	Boston, Massachusetts
2006	4	Il Barbiere di Siviglia (The Barber of Seville)	Rossini	Almaviva (Cover)	Saint Louis Opera	Saint Louis, Missouri
2007	5	Così Fan Tutte	Wolfgang Amadeus Mozart	Ferrando (Cover)	Santa Fe Opera	Santa Fe, New Mexico
2008	6	Lucia di Lammermoor	Gaetano Donizetti	Edgardo	Riverside Lyric Opera	London, UK
	7	Tosca	Giacomo Puccini	Cavaradossi (Cover)	Raymond Gubbay Production	London, UK
2009	8	Carmen	Georges Bizet	Don Jose (Cover)	Raymond Gubbay Production	London, UK
	9	Falstaff	Giuseppe Verdi	Fenton (Cover)	Glyndebourne Festival	Lewes, England
2010	10	Tosca	Giacomo Puccini	Cavaradossi	Northern Ireland Opera	Belfast, Northern Ireland
	11	La Traviata	Giuseppe Verdi	Alfredo	West Bay Opera	Palo Alto, California
	12	Madame Butterfly	Giacomo Puccini	Pinkerton	Grange Park Opera	Nevill Holt
2011	13	Maria di Rohan	Gaetano Donizetti	Riccardo	Berliner Operngruppe	Berlin, Germany
	14	La Traviata	Giuseppe Verdi	Alfredo	Opera de Dijon	Dijon, France
2012	15	La Traviata	Giuseppe Verdi	Alfredo	Theatre de Caen	Caen, France
	16	Don Giovanni	Wolfgang Amadeus Mozart	Don Ottavio	Garsington Opera	London, UK
	17	Don Giovanni	Wolfgang Amadeus Mozart	Don Ottavio	Birgitta Festival	Tallinn, Estonia
	18	La Traviata	Giuseppe Verdi	Alfredo	Scottish Opera	Glasgow, Scotland
2013	19	La Traviata	Giuseppe Verdi	Alfredo	Vorarlberger Landestheater	Bregenz, Austria
	20	Don Pasquale	Gaetano Donizetti	Ernesto	Teatro del Bicentenario	Leon, Mexico
	21	I Puritani	Vincenzo Bellini	Arturo	Grange Park Opera	London, UK
2014	22	Don Pasquale	Gaetano Donizetti	Ernesto	Tiroler Landestheater	Innsbruck, Austria
	23	Rigoletto	Giuseppe Verdi	Il Duca di Mantova	Vorarlberger Landestheater	Bregenz, Austria
	24	Les Pêcheurs de perles (The Pearl Fishers)	Georges Bizet	Nadir	Teatro Reggio di Parma	Parma, Italy
	25	Les Pêcheurs de perles (The Pearl Fishers)	Georges Bizet	Nadir	Teatro Comunale di Modena	Modena, Italy
	26	La Sonnambula (The Sleepwalker)	Vincenzo Bellini	Elvino	Teatro Comunale di Treviso	Treviso, Italy
	27	I Capuleti e i Montecchi	Vincenzo Bellini	Tebaldo	Teatro Massimo di Bellini	Catania, Italy
2015	28	I Puritani	Vincenzo Bellini	Arturo	Opera di Firenze	Florence, Italy
	29	La Sonnambula (The Sleepwalker)	Vincenzo Bellini	Elvino	Teatro Comunale di Ferrara	Ferrara, Italy
	30	La Sonnambula (The Sleepwalker)	Vincenzo Bellini	Elvino	Teatro Comunale Alighieri di Ravenna	Ravenna, Italy
	31	La Belle Hélène	Jacques Offenbach	Paris	Théâtre du Châtelet	Paris, France
	32	Les Pêcheurs de perles (The Pearl Fishers)	Georges Bizet	Nadir	Korea National Opera	Seoul, South Korea
	33	Les Pêcheurs de perles (The Pearl Fishers)	Georges Bizet	Nadir	Korea National Opera	Daegu, South Korea
2016	34	Les Pêcheurs de perles (The Pearl Fishers)	Georges Bizet	Nadir	Opera di Firenze	Florence, Italy
	35	La Sonnambula (The Sleepwalker)	Vincenzo Bellini	Elvino	Teatro Filarmonico di Verona	Verona, Italy
	36	Roméo et Juliette	Charles Gounod	Roméo	Atlanta Opera	Atlanta, Georgia
	37	La Sonnambula (The Sleepwalker)	Vincenzo Bellini	Elvino	Teatro Massimo di Bellini	Catania, Italy
	38	Roméo et Juliette	Charles Gounod	Roméo	Royal Opera House of Muscat	Muscat, Oman
2017	39	Les Pêcheurs de perles (The Pearl Fishers)	Georges Bizet	Nadir	Teatro Verdi di Trieste	Trieste, Italy
	40	Rigoletto	Giuseppe Verdi	Il Duca di Mantova	Opera Nice Côte d’Azur	Nice, France
	41	Les Pêcheurs de perles (The Pearl Fishers)	Georges Bizet	Nadir	Korea National Opera	Seoul, South Korea
	42	Rigoletto	Giuseppe Verdi	Il Duca di Mantova	Oper im Steinbruch	Vienna, Austria
	43	La Sonnambula (The Sleepwalker)	Vincenzo Bellini	Elvino	Amigos de la Opera de Vigo	Vigo, Spain
	44	Lucia di Lammermoor	Gaetano Donizetti	Edgargo	Florida Grand Opera	Miami, Florida
2018	45	La Sonnambula (The Sleepwalker)	Vincenzo Bellini	Elvino	Staatsoper Stuttgart	Stuttgart, Germany
	46	Roméo et Juliette	Charles Gounod	Roméo	Opera Nice Côte d’Azur	Nice, France
	47	Nabucco	Giuseppe Verdi	Ismaele	Opera Nice Côte d’Azur	Nice, France
	48	Nabucco	Giuseppe Verdi	Ismaele	Opéra de Toulon	Toulon, France
2019	49	La Sonnambula (The Sleepwalker)	Vincenzo Bellini	Elvino	Deutsche Oper Berlin	Berlin, Germany
	50	Lucia di Lammermoor	Gaetano Donizetti	Edgargo	Deutsche Oper Berlin	Berlin, Germany
	51	La Traviata	Giuseppe Verdi	Alfredo	Minnesota Opera	Saint Paul, Minnesota
	52	Roméo et Juliette	Charles Gounod	Roméo	Graz Opera	Graz, Austria
	53	The Tales of Hoffmann (Les contes d’Hoffmann)	Jacques Offenbach	Hoffmann	Palacio de Bellas Artes	Mexico City, Mexico
2021	54	Montezuma	Carl Heinrich Graun	Hernán Cortés	Palacio de Bellas Artes	Mexico City, Mexico
	55	Roméo et Juliette	Charles Gounod	Roméo	Opera Comique	Paris, France
2022	56	Guillaume Tell	Gioachino Rossini	Arnold	Irish National Opera	Ireland
2024	57	La fille du régiment	Gaetano Donizetti	Tonio	Klaipėda State Musical Theatre	Klaipėda, Lithuania
