= William Marsey =

British composer (born 1989)

- Born: 29 September 1989 (age 37); Hartlepool, County Durham
- Occupation: Composer
- Website: www.wmarsey.com

William Marsey (born 29 September 1989) is a British composer. He studied music at the University of Cambridge and composition at the Royal Academy of Music (where he was Manson Fellow) and the Guildhall School of Music and Drama. He is also one of three artistic directors of Listenpony, a concert series, record label and commissioning body based in London.

Marsey's piece Belmont Chill (from Dutch Indoor Subjects) for solo piano was nominated for the British Composer Awards in 2018. He also composed music for Hofesh Shechter's East Wall in the same year.

Marsey received an Ivor Novello Award nomination at The Ivors Classical Awards 2023. Why Do You Grieve, for chamber ensemble, was nominated for Best Chamber Ensemble Composition. In 2026 he was awarded the Arts Foundation Fellowship for Music.

His orchestral piece Man with Limp Wrist, commissioned by the LA Phil, was recorded and released by the Hallé, with Thomas Adès conducting. The US premiere of this piece was given at the Walt Disney Hall in LA in February 2026.

== Notable works ==
=== Orchestra ===
- The Sea (2019), premiered by the Royal Northern Sinfonia conducted by Lars Vogt
- Man with Limp Wrist (2023), for orchestra, commissioned by the Los Angeles Philharmonic; premiered by The Hallé in Manchester, UK, October 2023

=== Ensemble ===
- Dances of Travel (2018) for 13 players, premiered by the Royal Academy Manson Ensemble conducted by Oliver Knussen
- Why Do You Grieve (2022) for 11 players, premiered by Ozero Ensemble conducted by Oliver Zeffman

=== Voices ===
- The Beauty of Sexuality (2011) for solo voices SATBarB and piano
- Austerity Songs (2017) for solo voices SATB and piano (commissioned by Songspiel)
- Removal and Other Powers (2022) for soprano, mezzo soprano and piano

=== Chamber ===
- Doctor (2016) for saxophone quartet
- For Grace, After a Party (2018) for cello and accordion

=== Multimedia ===
- Be nice to see you (2019) for string quartet and recorded sound
- Stone Him for soprano, mezzo soprano, violin and video, with Antonia Luxem
- Circadian Nocturne (2023), music for an app by Anna Ridler
- Circadian Bloom (2025), generative score for Anna Ridler's app

=== Solo ===
- Dutch Indoor Subjects (2018) for solo piano
- Sonata for solo piano, premiered in 2026
