= Nevill Holt Opera =

UK music festival

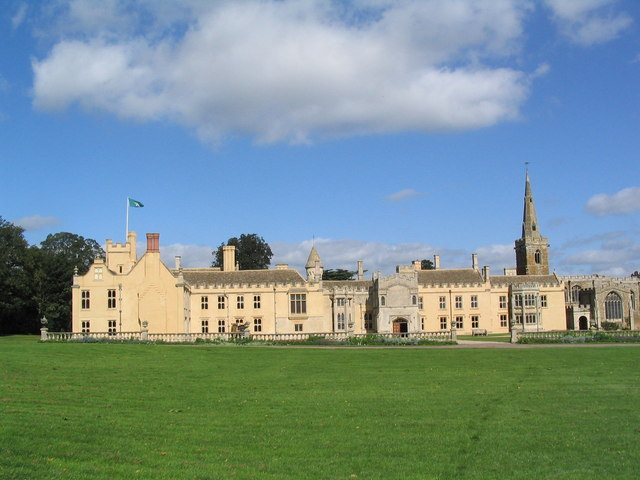
Nevill Holt Hall

Nevill Holt Festival, previously Nevill Holt Opera, is a summer arts festival held at the Nevill Holt Hall estate, near Market Harborough in Leicestershire, the home of David Ross.

== History ==
Opera has been performed at Nevill Holt Hall since Carphone Warehouse co-founder David Ross bought the estate in 2000, initially as a Midlands outpost of Grange Park Opera. In 2013, Ross founded Nevill Holt Opera, with Nicholas Chalmers as artistic director.

A new 400-seat opera house in the stable block by architects Witherford Watson Mann opened in June 2018. The new opera house won the 2019 RIBA National Award and made the shortlist for the 2019 Stirling Prize for excellence in architecture. Performances in 2021 were held outside due to COVID-19 restrictions.

In 2023 Nevill Holt Opera announced it was facing financial difficulties and cancelled two of the four productions planned for that year due to poor ticket sales. On the same day, Nicholas Chalmers announced his immediate resignation. In an attempt to reverse its fortunes, the festival rebranded in 2024 as Nevill Holt Festival and included other arts and culture events.

== See also ==
- List of opera festivals
- Country house opera
- Country house theatre
