= Trouble in Tahiti =

1952 opera by Leonard Bernstein

- Opera by Leonard Bernstein
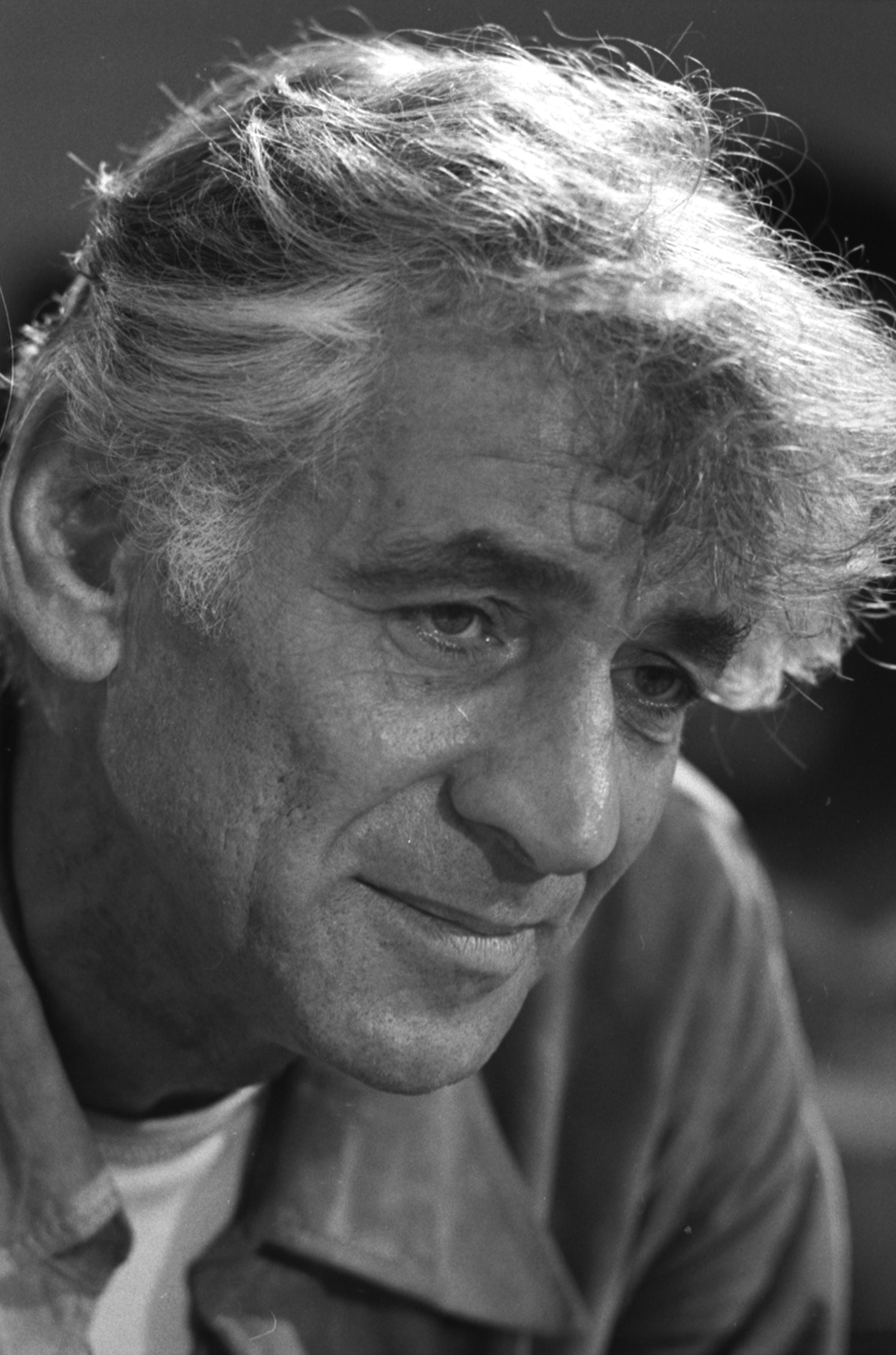
- Bernstein in 1971
- Librettist: Leonard Bernstein
- Language: English
- Premiere: 12 June 1952; Brandeis University

Trouble in Tahiti is a one-act opera in seven scenes composed by Leonard Bernstein with an English libretto by the composer. It is the darkest among Bernstein's "musicals", and one of only two for which he wrote the words and the music. Trouble in Tahiti received its first performance on 12 June 1952 at Bernstein's Festival of the Creative Arts on the campus of Brandeis University in Waltham, Massachusetts, to an audience of nearly 3,000 people. The NBC Opera Theatre subsequently presented the opera on television in November 1952, a production which marked mezzo-soprano Beverly Wolff's professional debut in the role of Dinah. Wolff later reprised the role in the New York City Opera's first staging of the work in 1958. The original work is about 40 minutes long.

== Background ==
Bernstein was working on the opera during his honeymoon with Felicia Montealegre. The story is based on the relationship of Bernstein's own parents, Sam and Jennie, but the wife's name was changed to the more singable Dinah, Bernstein's grandmother. The work is dedicated to Marc Blitzstein; Blitzstein and Bernstein were good friends, both alumni of the Curtis Institute in Philadelphia. Bernstein had produced one production of Blitzstein's The Cradle Will Rock.

== Plot analysis ==
The opera is frequently performed with minimal scenery (although Bernstein gave detailed instructions for drops and props) and very simple costumes. There are only two soloists, a married couple named Sam and Dinah. Their son, Junior, is often referred to but is never seen or heard. Other characters are addressed in certain scenes but also are never seen or heard: Sam's client Mr Partridge (on the telephone); his friend Bill (present and interacting with Sam but intended to be invisible); his secretary Miss Brown (present but intended to be invisible); Dinah's psychoanalyst ("invisible"); her milliner ("imaginary").

Trouble in Tahiti is the story of one day in the life of these desperately unhappy, though married people, lonely, longing for love, and unable to communicate. At the end of the opera, Sam and Dinah show a willingness to sacrifice for each other, out of commitment to the marriage, though there's not much pleasure to be had. A copyright is held for an alternate ending by Bernstein, which has not been released.

The opera also uses a vocal trio, dance-band "ensemble" style (often referred to by others as a scat singing jazz trio), whose role is important. Bernstein refers to them in production notes published with the score as "A Greek chorus born of the radio commercial". The trio opens the work singing the glories of Su-bur-bi-a, using the same pattern – c, f, g, c' – as in the line "New York, New York" from Bernstein's (as composer) earlier musical On the Town. The sun wakens the couple, kindles their love, kisses the windows, kisses the walls, kisses the doorknob and the "pretty red roof", kisses the flagstones on the front lawn, the paper at the front door, the roses around the front door of "the little white house" in Scarsdale (New York), Wellesley Hills (Massachusetts), Ozone Park (New York), Highland Park (Illinois), Shaker Heights (Ohio), Michigan Park (a white enclave in black Washington, D.C.), and Beverly Hills (California) – all upper-middle-class, white suburbs where people lived who had "made it", who had gotten "out of the hubbub". "Have a good day in the city today. Joy to your labors, until you return." The viewer is about to witness a day in the life of an idyllic couple living there. "Skid a lit day: skid a lit day... Ratty boo." In the middle of the opening, one member of the trio sings a stanza of nonsense, then sings it again – the same nonsense – accompanied by a solo jazz clarinet.

The trio appears several times later. In an interlude, they speak well of how possessions contribute to the "wonderful life": up-to-date kitchen, washing machine, colorful bathrooms, Life magazine, Sheraton sofa, Chippendale chair, bone chinaware, real solid silver, two-door sedan and convertible coupe – "Who could ask heaven for anything more?" Their "sweet little son" seems another one of the possessions: "family picture, second to none".

== Roles ==
Roles, voice types, premiere cast
Role	Voice type	Premiere cast, 12 June 1952 Conductor: Leonard Bernstein
Sam, a businessman	baritone	David Atkinson
Dinah, his wife	mezzo-soprano	Nell Tangeman
1st trio member	soprano	Constance Brigham
2nd trio member	tenor	Robert Kole
3rd trio member	baritone	Claude Heater

== British première ==
The British première took place on 8-12 November 1983 in Cambridge, UK, at the ADC Theatre. A review of the performance was published in Opera magazine in February 1984 by William Davies.

Cast - Sam - Richard Craddock; Dinah - Vickie Jaffee; Trio - Nicola-Jane Kemp, David Watson, Russell Watson; Musical Direction - Peter Crockford; Director - David Pickard.

== Synopsis ==
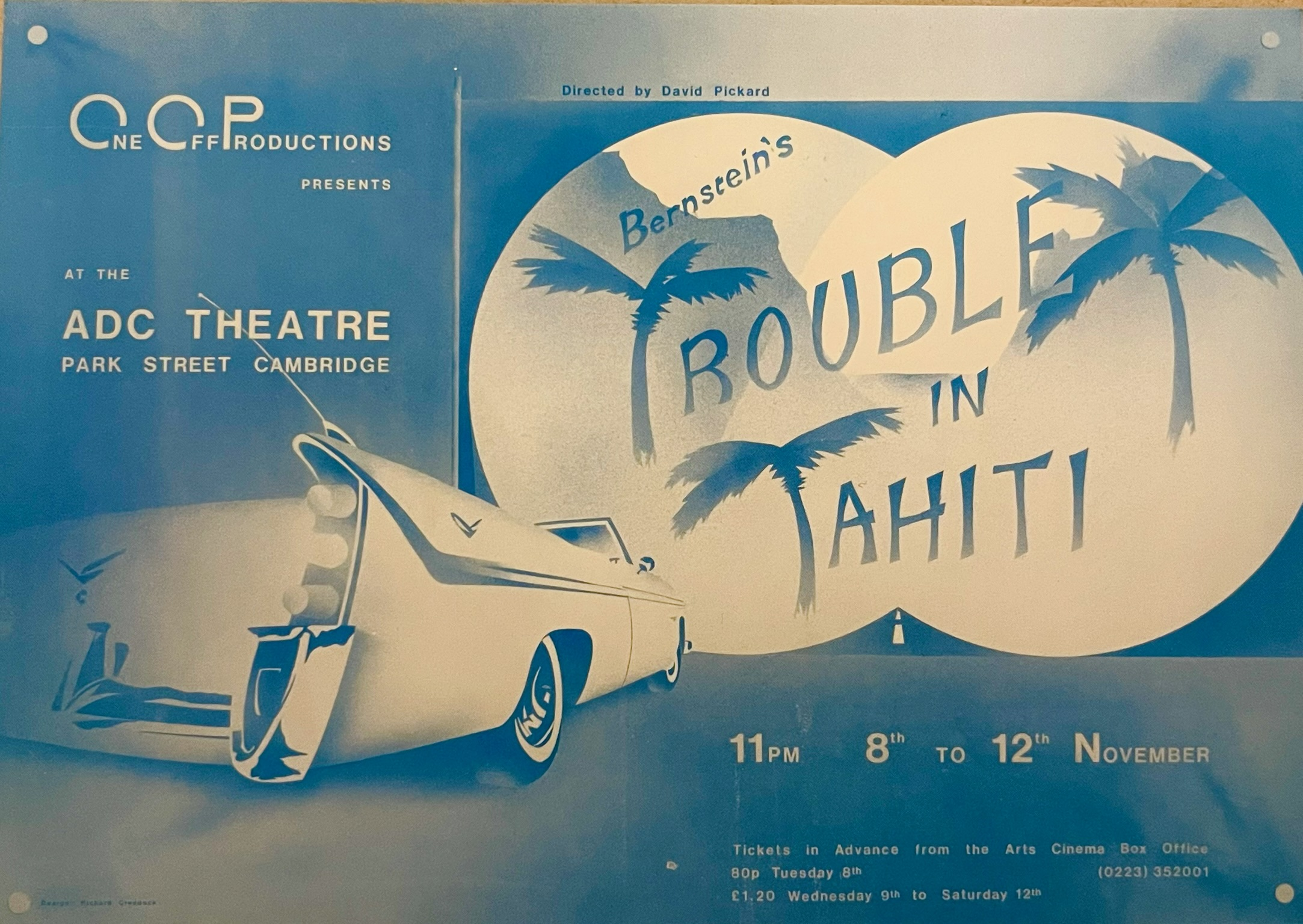

Prelude – A smiling jazz trio sings of perfect life in an affluent, unnamed suburban town, with its little white houses and happy, loving families ("Mornin' Sun").

Scene I – Real life in suburbia contrasts greatly with what the Trio has painted. Sam and Dinah are having breakfast, alternating between habitual bickering and lyrical moments of longing for kindness. Dinah is angry with Sam. She accuses him of having an affair with his secretary, which he denies. She also reminds Sam that their son Junior's play is that afternoon, but Sam insists that his handball tournament at the gym is more important, to which she retorts, "To hell with the gym". She needs more money to pay for her analyst, who Sam calls an "out-and-out fake". Dinah says Sam should go too, a suggestion which Sam pays no attention to. They agree that this is not the way to live, and they will have a conversation about their relationship problems in the evening. They both ask each other for kindness, ask the other for help "to love you again" and pray that the wall built up between them can be broken down. They continue to argue until Sam leaves for the office, late for his train.

Scene II – Sam, at work, exuding confidence, is dealing with business on the telephone. On the phone, he turns down entreaties from Mr. Partridge, presumably for a loan. The chorus calls him a genius and a "marvelous man".

Then comes a call from "Bill", who he is glad to lend money to: "You'll return it whenever you want to... Is it sufficient?" Coincidentally, Bill is also participating in the handball tournament with Sam. The chorus observes that "When it comes to the giving, no one touches big-hearted Sam".

Scene III – In her analyst's office, Dinah recalls a dream about finding an imaginary garden amid a "black and bare" landscape, and sings about the image longingly.

Meanwhile, at Sam's office, he asks his secretary if he ever made a pass at her. When reminded of an incident, he insists, in a menacing way, that it was an accident and that she should forget that it ever happened.

Scene IV – Sam and Dinah accidentally run into each other on the street. Rather than having lunch with each other, they both make up lies about imaginary commitments to lunch with others. They continue to sing on the stage (though not to each other), reflecting on the confusing and painful course their relationship has taken, and yearn for their lost happiness.

Interlude – Inside the house, the Trio sings of lovely life in Suburbia, detailing the possessions that contribute to the American Dream.

Scene V – At the gym, Sam has just won the handball tournament. He sings triumphantly that "There's a law about men" – how some try with all their might to rise to the top, but will never win; while others, like him, are born winners and will always succeed. "Men are created unequal."

Scene VI – In a hat shop, Dinah tells an unidentified person about a South Sea romance movie called "Trouble in Tahiti", which she has just spent the afternoon watching. (Later, we learn that she has missed Junior's play.) At first she dismisses the movie as Technicolor drivel. But as she recounts the story and its theme song "Island Magic", backed by the Trio, she gets caught up in the escapist fantasy of love. Suddenly self-conscious, she stops herself, as she has to prepare dinner for Sam.

Scene VII – About to enter his home, Sam sings of another law of men – that even the winner must pay "through the nose" for what he gets.

The Trio sings of imaginary evenings of domestic bliss in Suburbia: "bringing the loved ones together, safe by the warmth of the firelight". After dinner, Dinah is knitting and Sam is reading the paper. Sam decides the time has come for their talk, and Dinah, after asking what he wants to talk about, agrees: "anything you say". Yet Sam can't talk; he doesn't know where to begin. He blames Dinah for interruptions, but she has not said anything. "It's no use", he says. In the only spoken dialogue in the opera, Sam asks Dinah about Junior's play, and she admits she didn't go either. He suggests they go to the movies, to see a new film about Tahiti; Dinah consents. ("Sure, why not? Anything.") As they leave, they each long for quiet and communion, wondering if it's possible to rediscover their love for one another. For now, they opt for the "bought-and-paid-for magic" of the silver screen. The Trio makes its final ironic comment, reprising the movie's "Island Magic" theme song.

== Orchestral suite ==
With the permission of the Leonard Bernstein Office Inc. (the musical estate of the composer), Paul Chihara adapted the operatic music into an orchestral suite. In March 2012, the Orpheus Chamber Orchestra performed the New York premiere of the adaptation at Carnegie Hall.

== Choral version ==
With the permission of the Leonard Bernstein Office Inc., the Chinese University of Hong Kong Chorus gave a semi-staged performance of the opera with a chamber choir substituting the Trio as scored. On 17 June 2018, the chorus performed the adaptation with Garth Edwin Sunderland's reduced orchestration in their Leonard Bernstein centennial celebration concert "Bernstein in the Theater" at Hong Kong City Hall Concert Hall.

== Continuation ==
Bernstein wrote a continuation, A Quiet Place (1983, libretto by Stephen Wadsworth), which was poorly received. It was rewritten incorporating Trouble in Tahiti in the form of an extended flashback. The opera, set 30 years later, depicts the aftermath of Dinah's death in a car crash and Sam's struggle to reconcile with his adult children.

== On screen ==
In 1970 the Australian Broadcasting Corporation produced a television version of the opera. It was first broadcast in Sydney on ABC-TV on 19 March 1972. It starred Raymond Duparc as Sam and Marie Tysoe as Dinah.

A version with live singers performing on animated sets was broadcast on PBS in the United States in 1973, later available on VHS and DVD. Nancy Williams and Julian Patrick played the couple, with Antonia Butler, Michael Clarke and Mark Brown as the trio. Leonard Bernstein conducted.

In 2001, the BBC released a film version directed by Tom Cairns with Stephanie Novacek as Dinah and Karl Daymond as Sam.

In 2018, Opera North created a film version, based on the company's stage production, produced by The Space and directed by Matthew Eberhardt, starring Wallis Giunta and Quirijn de Lang. The film was broadcast on Sky Arts in October 2018 and again in October 2020.

== Recordings ==
Trouble in Tahiti was first recorded in 1958 by the MGM Studio Orchestra under Arthur Winograd for MGM Records. It was then recorded by the composer with the Columbia Wind Ensemble and the same cast as the 1973 PBS broadcast. It was released by Columbia Masterworks in October 1974. Extracts were re-released in a Bernstein Songbook compilation CD in 1988, and the Columbia recording was re-released on CD as part of a three-disc Bernstein Theatre Works set in 1991, in the "Bernstein Century" series (along with Facsimile) in 1999, as part of a Bernstein retrospective 10-CD set in 2008, and finally as part of an 18-CD collection in 2017. A third recording, by the Orchestre de Picardie and Pascal Verrot was issued by Calliope Records in 2003.

Dawn Upshaw recorded "What a Movie!" for her 1998 album The World So Wide.

The version incorporated into A Quiet Place features in the Deutsche Grammophon live recording of that opera from 1983.

== See also ==
- List of films featuring fictional films
