= The Grange Festival =

English country house opera

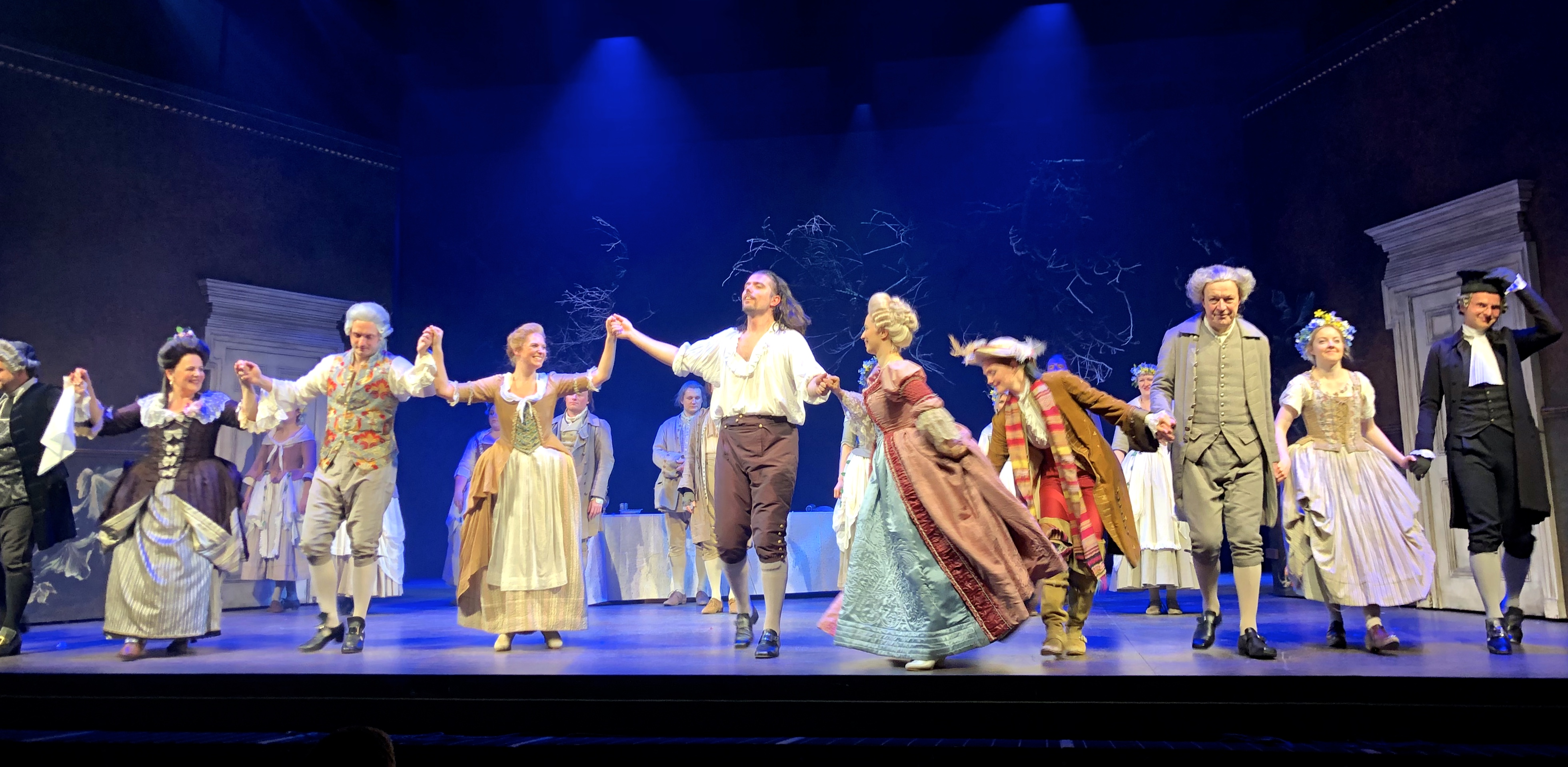
- Opera performance at the Grange Festival in 2019
- Genre: Opera
- Dates: 2016 –present
- Locations: The Grange, Northington, Hampshire
- Coordinates: 51°7′19.28″N 1°11′56.28″W
- Founders: Michael Chance
- Website: thegrangefestival.co.uk

The Grange Festival is a summer opera festival established in 2017 to continue performances at The Grange opera house in Hampshire.

== History ==
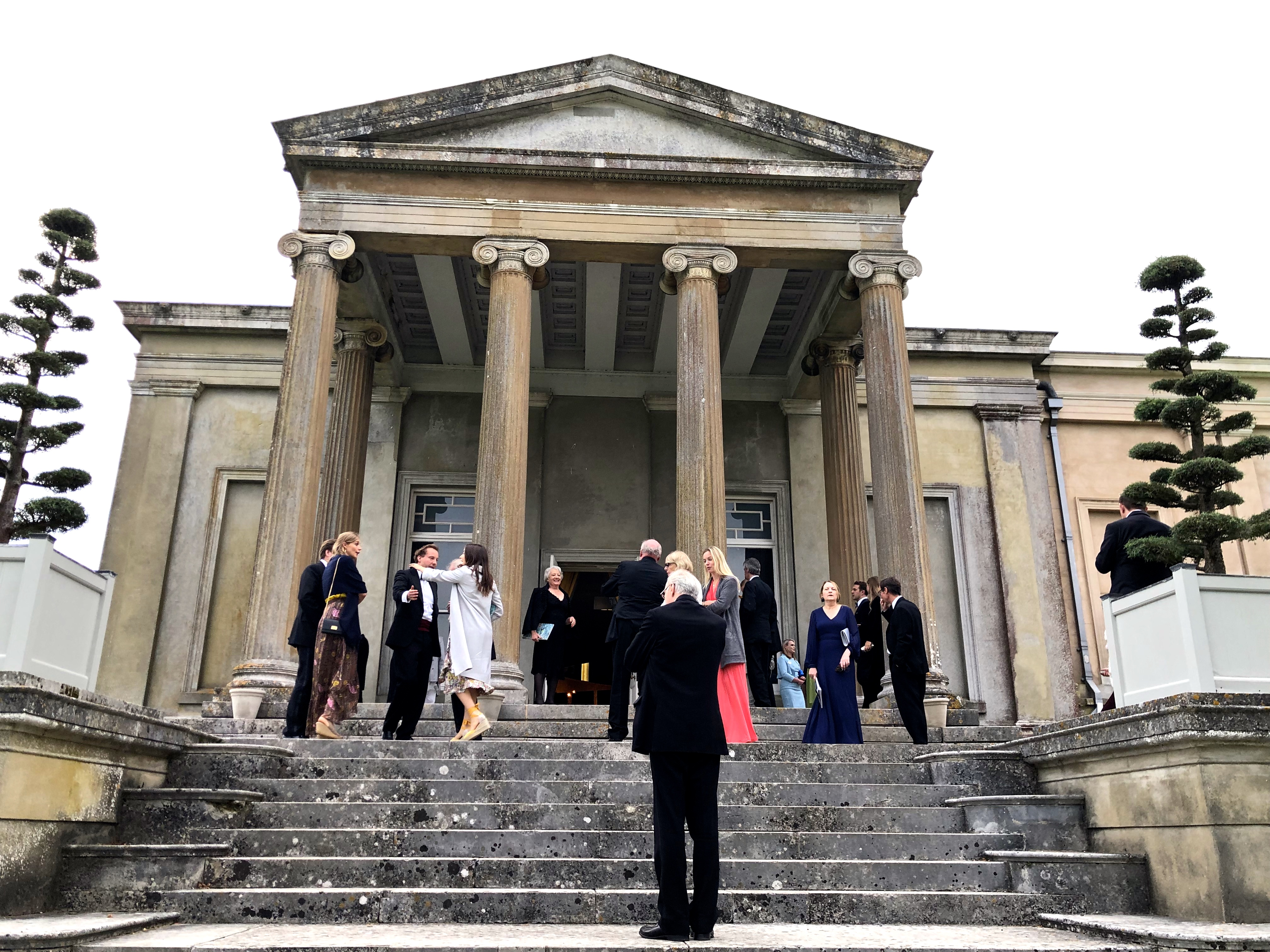
Grange Festival-goers in 2019

There is a history of opera at The Grange, Northington that pre-dates The Grange Festival – the opera company Grange Park Opera was established there by Wasfi Kani and Michael Moody in 1998, and a new, award-winning opera house was built at the site in 2002. After seventeen years, Grange Park Opera relocated to West Horsley Place at the end of the 2016 season, following a dispute over a new lease. The Grange Festival was formed, after the departure of Grange Park Opera, by Michael Chance CBE, Rachel Pearson and Michael Moody, with Charles Haddon-Cave as chairman. The Bournemouth Symphony Orchestra and The Academy of Ancient Music were named as the festival's orchestras in residence.

== Performances ==
The Grange Festival opened on 7 June 2017 with Monteverdi's Il ritorno d'Ulisse in patria directed by Tim Supple. Bizet's Carmen was directed by Annabel Arden and conducted by Jean-Luc Tinguaud. Albert Herring brought together the conductor Steuart Bedford and the director John Copley, who both knew and worked with Benjamin Britten. Albert Herring was nominated in the best opera category of the 2018 South Bank Sky Arts Awards In September 2017 the company staged a newly orchestrated production of Jonathan Dove's Mansfield Park.

The 2018 season opened with Dance@TheGrange directed by Wayne McGregor and Edward Watson, followed by a well-received production of Handel's Agrippina with the Academy of Ancient Music. The Barber of Seville by Rossini directed by Stephen Barlow followed. Copley returned to direct Mozart's The Abduction from the Seraglio and a single concert performance of Candide by Leonard Bernstein completed the season.

In 2019 McGregor returned with performances of "21st Century Women". The three operas were Mozart's The Marriage of Figaro directed by Martin Lloyd Evans and conducted by Richard Egarr with the Academy of Ancient Music, Falstaff by Giuseppe Verdi and an operatic production of Handel's oratorio, Belshazzar. There was also a single concert by the John Wilson Orchestra entitled "Gershwin in Hollywood".

The 2020 season was cancelled on 18 March 2020 due to the coronavirus pandemic. The planned season was to include Rossini's La Cenerentola directed by Stephen Barlow and conducted by David Parry; Britten's A Midsummer Night's Dream directed by Paul Curran and conducted by Anthony Kraus; and Puccini's Manon Lescaut conducted by Francesco Cilluffo in a new production by Stephen Lawless. The season was also to see the return of Dance@TheGrange directed by Wayne McGregor, and concert performances of Lerner & Loewe's My Fair Lady conducted by Alfonso Casado Trigo and directed by Paul Curran.

In response to the coronavirus pandemic, an outdoor "promenade" production entitled Precipice, compiled by director and writer Sinéad O'Neill and designer Joanna Parker, was performed over the weekend of 22/23 August 2020. This work incorporated opera, acrobatics, dance, choral and instrumental music and received generally positive reviews.

The 2021 season included A Midsummer Night's Dream; La Cenerentola; Manon Lescaut; My Fair Lady; and the play King Lear.

The 2022 season included Macbeth, Tamerlano and The Yeomen of the Guard, with a jazz evening from The Marcus Roberts Trio and Wycliffe Gordon; and a dance commission Clorinda Agonistes (Clorinda the Warrior).

The 2023 season included operas Così fan tutte; an Orfeo ed Euridice and Dido and Aeneas double-bill; The Queen of Spades; and the world premiere of Anna, an opera composed by David Matthews to a libretto by Roger Scruton. It also included "Dawn to Dusk", a youth opera commission; and a concert "Ellington: From Stride to Strings".

== Other events ==
The final of The Grange Festival International Singing Competition took place on 24 September 2017. British soprano Rowan Pierce took the top prize of £7500 and a role in a future Grange Festival production. Pierce made her Grange debut in the 2019 season as Barbarina in The Marriage of Figaro.
