= Maria Britneva =

Russian-British actress (1921–1994)

The Right Honourable The Lady St Just
- Born: Maria Alexandrovna Britneva; 2 July 1921; Petrograd
- Died: 15 February 1994 (aged 72); London, England
- Other names: Maria Britnewa, Maria St. Just
- Occupation: Actress
- Years active: 1947–87
- Spouse: Peter Grenfell, 2nd Baron St Just (m. 1956; died 1984)
- Children: 3

Maria Britneva, Baroness St Just, (2 July 1921 – 15 February 1994) known as Maria St Just, was a Russian-British actress who was a close friend of Tennessee Williams. As co-trustee of the trust which he set up for his sister, she became his literary executor.

== Early life ==
Maria Britneva was born in Petrograd in the Soviet Union. Her mother, Mary Britneva, was British by birth, a daughter of Charles Herbert Bucknall, business partner in St Petersburg of the French wholesale gem dealers Leo and Georges Sachs. Her father, Alexander Britnev, was a physician who served in the Red Army and was shot in the purges of 1937. He was rehabilitated (his reputation restored) in 1969. In the summer of 1922, when Britneva was just thirteen months old, her mother left Russia and emigrated to England, taking with her Maria and her brother Vladimir. She was brought up in Hammersmith, where her mother settled and worked as a translator of Chekhov, and also by teaching Russian and French. In 1939, when registered at the outset of the Second World War, her mother was living in Fulham and stated her occupation as “writer and translator” and her date of birth as 3 April 1894. Britneva represented her paternal grandfather as having been court physician at Tsarskoye Selo, but no record has been traced of him.

As a child, Britneva studied ballet with Tamara Karsavina and was known as "the little grasshopper" for her ability to jump high, but later she could not pursue a career as a dancer because she was too small or because of foot trouble and, she said, overly large breasts. She instead studied acting at Michel Saint-Denis's London Theatre Studio school, where she was a contemporary of Peter Ustinov, and John Gielgud employed her in his London theatre company, but he and others considered her a poor actress.

== Personal life: Tennessee Williams ==
In 1948, at a party at her friend John Gielgud's house in Chelsea, Britneva met Tennessee Williams and they became passionate life-long friends. She was the inspiration for Maggie the Cat in Cat on a Hot Tin Roof, which Williams dedicated to her, borrowing Maria's descriptive of her in-laws, (no-neck monsters), for one of Maggie's most famous lines.

They corresponded for some time, and then she moved to New York, where in the early 1950s she lived in a small flat. According to John Lahr, Britneva wanted more than friendship, and fantasized to Arthur Miller about Williams wanting to marry her. She discussed the friendship with a psychotherapist, but essentially Britneva and Williams were close friends.

The part of Maggie the Cat was first played by Barbara Bel Geddes directed by Elia Kazan on Broadway in 1955, then by Kim Stanley directed by Peter Hall in London in 1958. Williams arranged parts for Britneva in performances of some of his plays; these were not much praised. He wrote epitaphs for her diabetic cousin, with whom she had been brought up, and her bulldog, who always snarled at him.

Britneva often traveled with Williams and his partner Frank Merlo; at one point, he said he felt guilty about using her as bait to attract others. She was reported to be the inspiration for the character of Maggie in Cat on a Hot Tin Roof. The biographer of Gore Vidal, who was close to Britneva and Williams, says of Britneva that she "cast herself in the role of devoted sister-caretaker" while a biographer of James Laughlin says she was "Tennessee's confidant and protective demon". In an article published in The New Yorker soon after her death, John Lahr wrote that he believed Britneva reminded Williams of his mother.

In 1955, Williams said after Britneva’s opening night performance as Blanche in A Streetcar Named Desire, in a production in Florida, "I thought I had written a good play till I saw her in it." Britevna was renowned as a hostess with such friends — aside from Williams — as John Gielgud, Gore Vidal, Franco Zeffirelli, and Leslie Caron.

In his obituary of her in The Independent, Kit Hesketh-Harvey suggests that she also had a great talent for protecting Williams' work: "Tennessee Williams astounded the theatrical world by making Maria St Just his literary executrix' he wrote."She vindicated his trust completely. Too rich to care about money, she was concerned only for the integrity of the performances which she was empowered to authorise. There hasn't been a dud since his death in 1983; and that his reputation is now restored is thanks to her."

== Personal life: others ==
Britneva had other entanglements while in the US. She was rumoured to have slept with Marlon Brando, and other affairs included one with John Huston; according to some reports, she had an abortion in 1951.

Britneva fell in love with James Laughlin, and in 1954 they became engaged to be married. Williams was reported as saying that for him this would be an "old-time happy ending", because Britneva and Laughlin had "a similar place in my heart"; but Laughlin broke off the engagement. He has been quoted as saying that life with Britneva would have been too restless, and that he had not realized how committed she was to the theatre. One assessment is that Laughlin became "terrified" of Britneva's "castrating willfulness". It is well documented that Williams was inspired by Maria, who called her step-children 'no-neck-monsters' when he wrote Cat on a Hot Tin Roof.

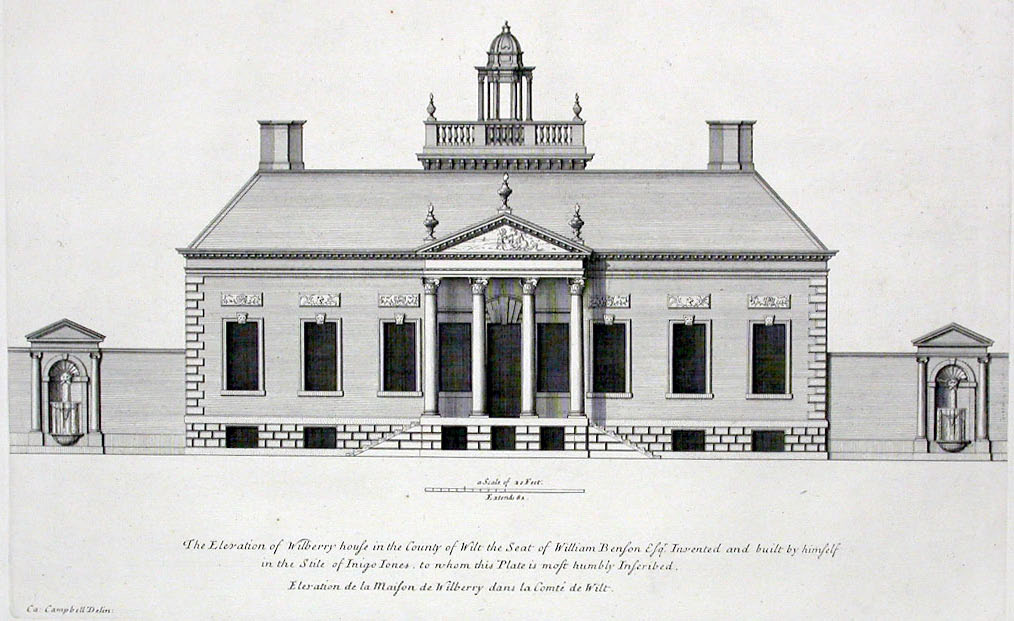
Wilbury House

In 1956, Britneva met an English peer, Peter Grenfell, second Lord St Just, and married him on 25 July 1956. Her mother had been in Canada and returned to England, arriving the day after the wedding. She was then resident of 24, Tennyson Mansions, Hammersmith.

In marrying St Just, Britneva became Lady St Just, stepmother of Laura Claire Grenfell, his six-year-old daughter by his first wife, Leslie Nast, daughter of Condé Nast. With him, she had two daughters of her own, Katherine Grenfell (born 1957), known as Katya or Pulcheria, and Natasha Jeannine Mary Grenfell (born 1959) known as Cheddar. One of her daughters had as a godfather Franco Zeffirelli, a good friend of Britneva’s.

Britneva kept up her friendship with Williams, who was a frequent visitor to both Wilbury House, her new home in England, and her London home next door to Noel Coward's house in Gerald Road, Belgravia.

As a hostess Maria lionised performing artists, and her lunch and dinner parties would typically include figures such as Claudio Abbado, Darcy Bussell, Lord Goodman, Ishmail Merchant and James Ivory, Leslie Caron and Placido Domingo. In later years her daughter's friends such as Rupert Everett became part of the circle too.

In 1964, Britneva’s mother died at the St George’s Retreat, Burgess Hill, West Sussex, and was buried in Earl's Court, her funeral being conducted by the Russian Orthodox Bishop of Great Britain, Nikodem. The funeral for Lady Maria St Just herself was held at the Russian Orthodox church in Ennismore Gardens, Knightsbridge.

== Later years ==
Britneva and Williams continued to write to each other, until shortly before his death in 1983. She was increasingly protective of him, going so far as to attempt to push his brother Dakin off a catwalk at the Lyceum Theatre after the Broadway opening of Out Cry in 1973. In 1975, Williams angered Britneva by mentioning her only briefly in his memoirs, in which he referred to her as "an occasional actress" and said she was "afflicted with folie de grandeur". At her insistence, he wrote an apology, claiming that editors had cut down his description of "this richly sustaining attachment". She was certainly the model for the Countess in his play This Is (1976). She was sometimes cruel to the other women in his life, and probably caused him to dismiss his agent Audrey Wood. Late in his life, some friends were sure she supplied Williams with drugs. However, at the end of his life, his friendship for her was cooling.

Williams named Maria St Just as co-trustee (with John Eastman, a celebrity lawyer and the brother of Linda McCartney) of the trust for his lobotomized sister, Rose. This had the effect of making her his literary executor, since the copyrights to his works were vested in the trust. In this role, she fiercely defended his legacy, to an extent that many found excessive, such as involving herself in casting and advising actors, denying scholars access to Williams's papers, demanding the right to vet the manuscript of the authorized biography, and rescinding permission that Williams had granted to Lyle Leverich for such a biography. She also refused permission for a biography by Margot Peters. Lahr describes her as considering herself "Williams' widow without a ring".

In 1981, Britneva’s daughter Katya married Oliver Gilmour and had two children, Natalia Claire Gilmour (born 1981) and Marco Oliver Gilmour (1988). This marriage ended in divorce.

Maria was given a small role as Daniel Day-Lewis' mother Mrs Vyse in the Merchant Ivory 1985 film, A Room With a View, as well as in their 1987 film Maurice starring Hugh Grant, that was filmed at her country house.

Lord St Just died in 1986, and in 1990 Britneva published a collection of her correspondence with Williams, under the title Five O'Clock Angel: Letters of Tennessee Williams to Maria St. Just, 1948–1982. This book was adapted for the stage by Kit Hesketh-Harvey. In the book, Britneva changes Brooks Atkinson's review in The New York Times of her 1955 performance as Blanche in A Streetcar Named Desire from a pan to a rave.

Britneva died in London in February 1994. The cause of death was heart failure as a result of rheumatoid arthritis. On her instructions, she was buried at Wilbury House, the Grenfell country house in Wiltshire, with her dogs rather than with her in-laws, with whom she did not get on well.

== Films ==
Britneva had minor parts in several films: Peccato che sia una Canaglia (1954; English title Too Bad She's Bad); The Scapegoat (1959); Suddenly, Last Summer (1959); The Roman Spring of Mrs. Stone (1961); A Room with a View (1985); and Maurice (1987).

Year	Title	Role	Notes
1952	Moulin Rouge	Woman Mistaken for Marie	Uncredited
1954	Too Bad She's Bad	English tourist	
1959	The Scapegoat	Maid	
1959	Suddenly, Last Summer	Lucy	
1961	The Roman Spring of Mrs. Stone	Principessa Bonmeni	Uncredited
1985	A Room with a View	Mrs Vyse, Cecil's mother	
1987	Maurice	Mrs. Sheepshanks	(final film role)
