= Al White =

American character actor (born 1942)

- Born: Allen Cliffton White; May 17, 1942 (age 83); Houston, Texas, U.S.
- Occupation: Actor
- Years active: 1970–present
- Height: 6 ft 2 in (188 cm)
- Spouse: Ronice
- Children: 1
- Awards: 1992 Theatre World Award for Outstanding New Talent on Broadway for August Wilson's Two Trains Running; Ovation Award for Ensemble Performance in August Wilson's Gem of the Ocean; NAACP Theatre Award for Ensemble Performance in August Wilson's Gem of the Ocean

Allen Cliffton White (born May 17, 1942) is an American character actor. He has appeared in various movies, such as Airplane! and Airplane II: The Sequel, and Back to the Future Part II. Over the course of his Hollywood acting career, White has frequently portrayed police detectives in television and film.

== Career ==
On screen, White is perhaps best known for his role in hit comedy Airplane! as the jive-talking man whose words have to be translated (he reprised the jive-talking for a courtroom scene in the sequel). He also acted in Back to the Future Part II and has a long television resume, including roles in popular shows Wonder Woman, The Jeffersons. The Incredible Hulk and The Dukes of Hazzard, and more recently CSI: Miami and The King of Queens.

White, who was raised in San Francisco, California from an early age, decided to embark on an acting career after he had been employed as a janitor in Golden Gate Park for eight years. White has won a number of awards for his theatre work. He later became a member of the American Conservatory Theater company for three years, performing in more than seventeen plays, from Shakespeare to playwright Tennessee Williams, who was playwright in residence at the time. White originated the role of the military officer in Williams' play This Is (An Entertainment). In 1975, the group went to the Soviet Union for a bicentennial cultural exchange, performing at the Bolshoi Theater in Moscow, as well as in Leningrad and Riga.

== Partial filmography ==
- They Call Me Mister Tibbs! (1970) - Spectator Outside Church (uncredited)
- The Hollywood Knights (1980) - Louis
- Airplane! (1980) - Second Jive Dude
- The Dukes of Hazzard (1982) - Burnett
- Gangster Wars (1981) - Big Joe Isson
- Airplane II: The Sequel (1982) - Witness
- The Dukes of Hazzard (1984) - Eddie Scoggins
- Massive Retaliation (1984) - Highway Patrolman
- Black Moon Rising (1986) - Maintenance Man
- Big Trouble (1986) - Mr. Williams
- Omega Syndrome (1986) - Sergeant Carlyle
- Critical Condition (1987) - Reggie
- Russkies (1987) - Captain Foley
- Red Scorpion (1988) - Kallunda Kintash
- Liberty & Bash (1989) - Detective Anderson
- Back to the Future Part II (1989) - Lewis (Dad)
- Servants of Twilight (1991) - Pete Lockburn
- Leprechaun 2 (1994) - Desk Sergeant
- Bombmeister (1995)
- Perfect Opposites (2004) - Dr. Barrett
- A Night at the Silent Movie Theater (2012) - Al - Dad
