= Amanda Roocroft =

English operatic soprano (b. 1966)

- Born: Amanda Jane Roocroft; 9 February 1966 (age 60); Coppull, England
- Occupations: Opera singer (soprano); Voice teacher
- Years active: 1989 – present

Amanda Jane Roocroft (born 9 February 1966) is an English operatic soprano, who in the course of her career has sung leading roles in the opera houses of Europe and North America.

She is also a voice professor at London's Royal College of Music and a Fellow of the Royal Northern College of Music in Manchester where she herself had trained as a singer. She also became a visiting tutor at the Royal Birmingham Conservatoire in 2018. Roocroft was the winner of the 2007 Laurence Olivier Award for Outstanding Achievement in Opera for her performance in the title role of Jenůfa at the English National Opera.

== Life and career ==
Roocroft was born in Coppull, a village in Lancashire, and was educated at Southlands High School and Runshaw College. She then attended the Royal Northern College of Music where she studied singing under Barbara Robotham. In 1988 while still a student, she won the Kathleen Ferrier Award. That same year she sang Fiordiligi in the college's production of Così fan tutte and in 1989 the title role in the RNCM production of Handel's Alcina—both to great praise from the British critic Michael Kennedy. He wrote of her performance in Alcina:

This was thrillingly beautiful singing, and she sustained it all evening. One has to write of it in terms of the young Seefried (Note: Irmgard Seefried) as the Composer and, a closer comparison, the young Baker (Note: Janet Baker) in Handel. In 40 years of listening to young singers, I have never before heard, at this stage in development, a phenomenon to surpass Miss Roocroft.

Roocroft made her professional recital debut in September 1989 at the Aix-en-Provence Festival and her professional operatic debut in 1990 as Sophie in Der Rosenkavalier with Welsh National Opera. House debuts followed at London's Royal Opera House (as Pamina) and Glyndebourne Festival Opera (as Fiordiligi) in 1991, and the Bavarian State Opera (as Fiordiligi) and the English National Opera (as Ginevra in Handel's Ariodante) in 1993. In 1994 she was the subject of a Granada Television documentary Amanda Roocroft: Opera's Rising Star. The film, directed by Colin Bell, chronicled the first seven years of her career, beginning with her days as a student and ending with her solo recording debut for EMI Records.

In North America, Roocroft made her Metropolitan Opera debut in 1997 as Donna Elvira in Don Giovanni and sang at Houston Grand Opera in 2010 as the Governess in Turn of the Screw. Roocroft's other roles in the latter part of her career have included Ellen Orford in Peter Grimes, the Duchess in Powder Her Face, Emilia Marty in The Makropulos Case, and the title roles in Janáček's Jenůfa and Káťa Kabanová.

In 2003 she was awarded an Honorary Doctor of Music from the University of Manchester, and in 2007 she received the Laurence Olivier Award for Outstanding Achievement in Opera for her performance in the English National Opera's production of Jenůfa. Since the mid-2000s, she has also been a professor of vocal studies at the Royal College of Music in London.

== Recordings ==
- Così fan tutte – Amanda Roocroft (Fiordiligi); Rosa Mannion (Dorabella); Rodney Gilfry (Guglielmo); Rainer Trost (Fernando); Eirian James (Despina); Claudio Nicolai (Don Alfonso); Monteverdi Choir; English Baroque Soloists (on authentic instruments); John Eliot Gardiner (conductor). Filmed live at the Théâtre du Châtelet in 1992, originally for television broadcast. Label: Deutsche Grammophon (DVD).
- Amanda Roocroft (arias and art songs) – Amanda Roocroft (soprano); London Philharmonic; Franz Welser-Möst (conductor). Recorded in 1994. Label: EMI Classics (CD).
- A Sea Symphony – Amanda Roocroft (soprano); Thomas Hampson (baritone); BBC Symphony Chorus; BBC Symphony Orchestra; Andrew Davis (conductor). Recorded in 1994. Label: Teldec (CD).
- Mozart and his Contemporaries (arias and art songs) – Amanda Roocroft (soprano); Academy of St Martin-in-the-Fields; Neville Marriner (conductor). Recorded in 1995. Label: EMI Classics (CD).
- Mahler: Symphony No. 4 – Amanda Roocroft (soprano); City of Birmingham Symphony Orchestra; Simon Rattle (conductor). Recorded in 1997. Label: EMI Classics (CD).
- Don Carlo – Robert Lloyd (Filippo II); Rolando Villazón (Don Carlo); Dwayne Croft (Rodrigo); Amanda Roocroft (Elisabetta di Valois); Violeta Urmana (La principessa d'Eboli); Chorus of De Nederlandse Opera; Royal Concertgebouw Orchestra; Riccardo Chailly (conductor). Filmed at the Het Muziektheater in 2004. Label: Opus Arte (DVD)
- None but the lonely heart (songs by Tchaikovsky, Strauss, and Debussy) – Amanda Roocroft (soprano); Malcolm Martineau (piano). Recorded in 2007. Label: Onyx (CD).
- Jenůfa – Amanda Roocroft (Jenůfa); Deborah Polaski (Kostelnic̆ka Buryjovka); Miroslav Dvorský (Laca Klemen̆); Nikolai Schukoff (S̆teva Burya); Mette Ejsing (Grandmother Buryjovka); Chorus and Orchestra of the Teatro Real; Ivor Bolton (conductor). Filmed at the Teatro Real, Madrid in 2009. Label: Opus Arte (DVD)
- Elgar: Complete Songs (Vols. 1 and 2) – Amanda Roocroft (soprano); Konrad Jarnot (baritone); Reinild Mees (piano). Vol. 1 recorded in 2007; Vol. 2 recorded in April 2008 and January 2009. Label: Channel Classics (CD)
- Hubert Parry: Works for Chorus and Orchestra – Amanda Roocroft (soprano); BBC National Chorus of Wales; BBC National Orchestra of Wales; Neeme Järvi (conductor). Recorded in 2012, nominated for the Grammy Award for Best Choral Performance in 2013. Label: Chandos Records (CD).
