= Robert Gard =

Robert Gard may refer to:

- Robert G. Gard Jr. (born 1928), United States Army general
- Robert Gard (tenor) (1927–2021), British-born Australian opera singer
