= Wasfi Kani =

English opera entrepreneur

OBE, CBE Wasfi Kani
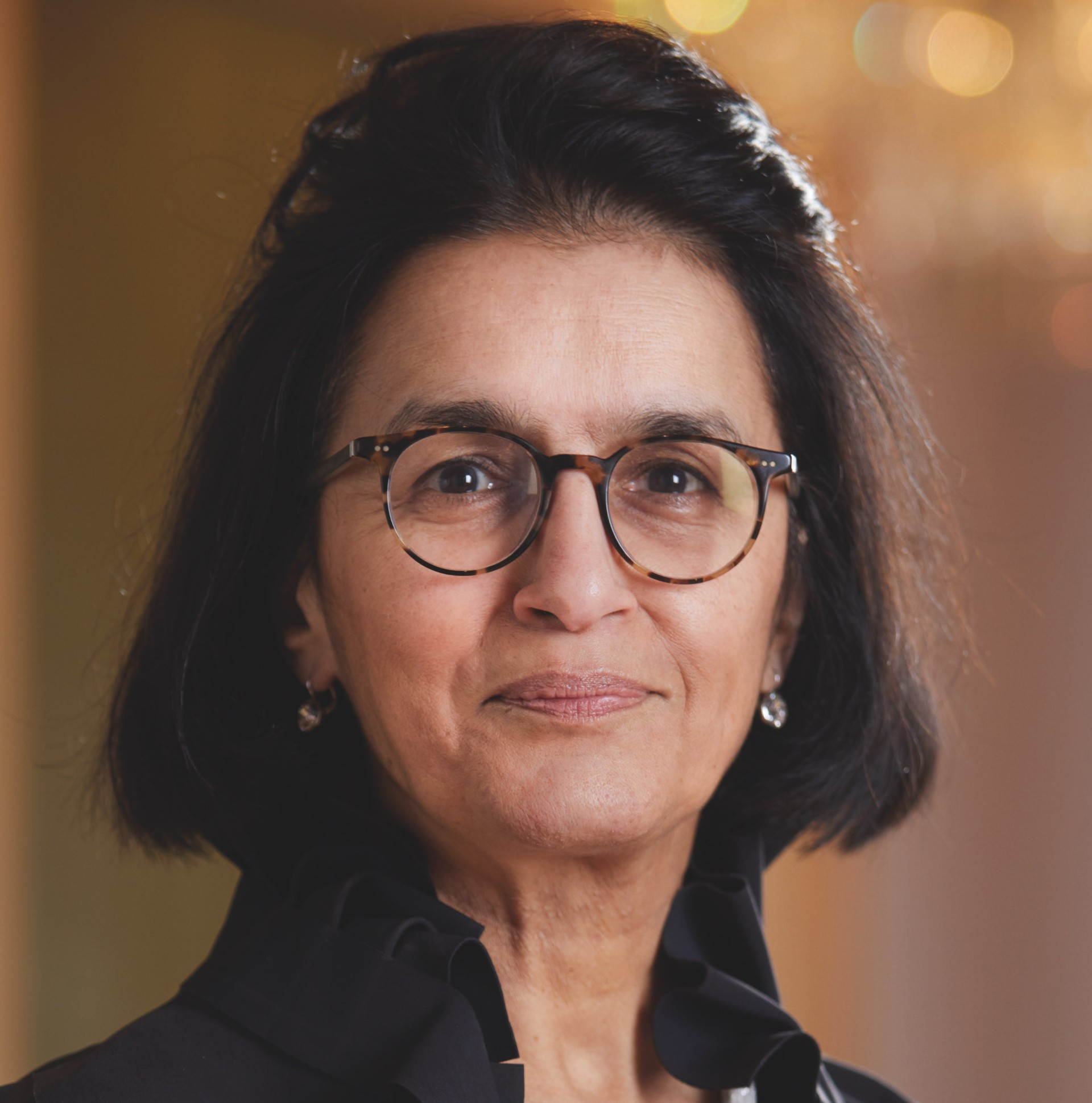
- Born: March 7, 1956 (age 69); Cable Street, London
- Known for: Founder of Pimlico Opera and Grange Park Opera

Wasfi Kani CBE (born London, 7 March 1956) is the founder of Pimlico Opera and Grange Park Opera.

Kani was born in Cable Street in London's East End where her parents lived after leaving India at partition. She attended Harry Gosling Primary School until 1962 when the family moved to Kilburn, London.

Kani played the violin in the National Youth Orchestra and went on to study music at St Hilda's College, Oxford (1975–79).

== Career ==
On leaving Oxford, Kani spent 10 years programming and designing financial computer systems in the City. Kani continued to play the violin and piano and she began to study conducting. In 1986 she started a small computer consultancy.

In 1987 Kani founded the small-scale touring company Pimlico Opera, staging productions in places such as banks, hospitals, country houses and prisons.

In 1992 Kani was made Chief Executive of Garsington Opera. During her five years’ tenure, she gained a reputation as a fundraiser, entrepreneur and administrator. After five years she left to create her own country house opera festival, Grange Park Opera, founded in 1997.

In 2003 Kani set up Nevill Holt Opera Festival in Leicestershire at the home of David Ross, co-founder of Carphone Warehouse. It was run as part of Grange Park Opera who built a temporary theatre in the stable courtyard and created a Friends' scheme. After 10 years Nevill Holt Opera became a separate company.

== Pimlico Opera ==
Pimlico Opera was founded in 1987 by Wasfi Kani and was the first opera company to specialise in performing in places such as hospitals, country houses, banks and prisons. In 1991 the company was awarded Arts Council funding: today it receives no public subsidy.

The company aims to use music and drama to advance personal development to engender a sense of community.

The work in prison began in 1989 when the company performed full-scale operas with orchestra in Wormwood Scrubs prison: The Marriage of Figaro (Mozart), The Bear (Walton). In 1991 came the first collaboration with prisoners: Sweeney Todd (Sondheim) with D-wing lifers from the Scrubs. Besides the educational and rehabilitative element of the project, the public audience are taken inside a prison to consider the purpose of imprisonment in a positive context. Since 1991 around 60,000 public have been taken into prison.

In November 1992, the collaboration with Wandsworth Prison, Guys & Dolls, was the subject of a BBC2 documentary "Guys, Dolls & D wing" which was nominated for a BAFTA.

Pimlico Opera has worked for nearly 30 years in many jails including Dublin's Mountjoy, Erlestoke, Winchester, Send, High Down, Downview, Bullingdon and most recently in HMP Bronzefield.

In 1994 Pimlico Opera staged the UK (and European) premiere of Shostakovich' musical Cheryomushki in the Lyric Theatre, Hammersmith. Pimlico commissioned David Pountney to write an English text, and composer Gerard McBurney to create a reduced orchestration. The BBC made a documentary on the project (Another Bite of the Cherry) which included footage from the 1963 Lenfilm film version. In 1995 it was recorded for BBC Music Magazine (Volume 3, Number 80) on tape and CD.

In the 1990s through to 2009 Pimlico Opera undertook a national small-scale tour funded by the Arts Council.

The Primary Robins project was initiated in 2013. The project brings music and singing into the lives of primary schoolchildren who have little exposure to it. There are currently 2,080 Robins in Hampshire, Durham, Nottingham, Newcastle and Surrey.

Pimlico Opera is the sister company of Grange Park Opera, founded 1997.

== Grange Park Opera ==
Grange Park Opera, a not-for-profit organisation, was founded in 1997.

In 2017, the company moved from Hampshire to a purpose-built 'Theatre in the Woods' at West Horsley Place – the 350-acre estate inherited by author and broadcaster Bamber Gascoigne in 2014. A 99-year lease from the Mary Roxburghe Trust, into which Bamber Gascoigne placed his inheritance, has been agreed.

With four tiers of seating in a horseshoe shape (modelled on La Scala, Milan), the Theatre in the Woods is designed to target an optimum acoustic reverberation of 1.4 seconds.

Singers who have performed with the company include Bryn Terfel, Simon Keenlyside, Joseph Calleja, Claire Rutter, Rachel Nicholls, Bryan Register, Susan Gritton, Wynne Evans, Sally Matthews, Alfie Boe, Robert Poulton, Jeffrey Lloyd-Roberts, Sara Fulgoni, Clive Bayley and Alastair Miles. The festival has also included musicals with productions of Fiddler on the Roof in 2015 and Oliver! in 2016. Fiddler on the Roof was subsequently staged in the Royal Albert Hall as part of the 2015 BBC Proms.

== Honours, awards and fellowships ==
Kani was appointed Officer of the Order of the British Empire (OBE) in 2002 and Commander of the Order of the British Empire (CBE) in the 2021 New Year Honours for services to the arts.

Honorary Doctorate: Southampton University – 2011

Honorary Doctorate: Winchester University – 2016

Honorary Fellow of The Royal Institute of British Architects – 2017

Honorary Fellow of St Hilda's College, Oxford – 2017
