= Kit Hesketh-Harvey =

British musician and screenwriter (1957–2023)

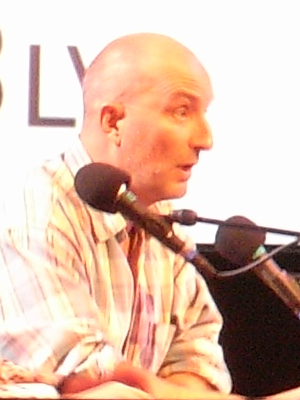
- Born: Christopher John Hesketh-Harvey; 30 April 1957; Zomba, Nyasaland (now Zomba, Malawi)
- Died: 1 February 2023 (aged 65)
- Education: Clare College, Cambridge
- Occupations: Musician; writer
- Years active: 1980–2023
- Spouse: Catherine Rabett (m. 1986; div. 2021)
- Children: 2
- Relatives: Sarah Sands (sister)

Christopher John Hesketh-Harvey (30 April 1957 – 1 February 2023) was a British musical performer, translator, composer, and screenwriter.

== Early life ==
Born in Zomba, Nyasaland (now Malawi), Rhodesia and Nyasaland, into a Foreign Office family, Hesketh-Harvey was educated as senior chorister at Canterbury Cathedral and then at Tonbridge School in Kent. He gained an Exhibition in English Literature as well as a choral scholarship to Clare College, Cambridge, where he studied under John Rutter and joined the Footlights.

== Career ==
Hesketh-Harvey worked as a staff producer for the BBC-TV Music and Arts Department, joining in 1980 and leaving to write the script for Merchant Ivory's Maurice (1987). He won the 1988 Vivian Ellis Award for musical-theatre writers and subsequently studied with Stephen Sondheim, who had been appointed to the Cameron Mackintosh visiting professorship in Contemporary Theatre at St Catherine's College, Oxford.

Hesketh-Harvey worked on The Vicar of Dibley series for the BBC. He wrote Full Throttle, starring Rowan Atkinson, and Hans Andersen: My Life as a Fairytale (Hallmark). He co-wrote the screenplay for Tim Walker's film The Lost Explorer. Another collaboration with Walker, The Granny Alphabet with his verses to Walker's photographs, was published by Thames and Hudson in 2013. His first detective novel, For The Shooting, was published in October 2017.

Hesketh-Harvey wrote and sang with pianist Richard Sisson for over 30 years, as a musical comedy duo Kit and The Widow, "showcasing his tart, precisely observed and witty style, delivered with exquisite pronunciation and perfect timing". They had a number of West End and Broadway theatre runs and international tours, notably with the late Joan Rivers. They made CD recordings, had their own series on BBC Radios 3 and 4, and two TV specials on Channel 4. As part of this duo, he wrote lyrics for Stuart Hancock's cantata Choir Straights, which the duo and the Bath Camerata premiered at London's Wigmore Hall in 2009 before restaging it in February of the following year at Rook Lane Chapel in Frome.

Hesketh-Harvey starred in the 1996 production of Salad Days at the Vaudeville Theatre, and in Tom Foolery (Jermyn Street and national tour). He co-devised and starred in the original production of the Sondheim revue Putting It Together. In 2011, he starred in Cowardy Custard (national tour) with Dillie Keane. He co-starred with Tim Minchin in the first BBC Comedy Prom at the Royal Albert Hall in 2011: the last time that Kit and the Widow appeared on stage together. He starred annually in pantomime at the Yvonne Arnaud Theatre Guildford, always playing the baddie. He made occasional appearances on many BBC Radio 4 series, such as Just a Minute and Quote Unquote. He also presented one-off documentaries on off-beat subjects for Radio 4.

His musicals written with composer James McConnel included Writing Orlando (Barbican 1988) and Yusupov (Bridewell Theatre). He adapted the English version of Jacques Offenbach's La Belle Hélène (2006) directed by Laurent Pelly for English National Opera. His translation of The Bartered Bride for Charles Mackerras at the Royal Opera House was Grammy nominated, and he translated many other operas.

Other musicals include Beautiful and Damned (2003). He presented several extras on Radio 4, including Chanson (2000), Hairspray and Harmonies (2009) and Tanning Tales (2013).

In Spring 2015, Hesketh-Harvey appeared alongside Juliet Stevenson as a guest in Janie Dee's Dream Queen as part of the London Festival of Cabaret in the Sam Wanamaker Playhouse at Shakespeare's Globe.

Original libretti include Varjak Paw. He adapted and produced 'The Caribbean Tempest', starring Kylie Minogue, in Barbados and Sydney 2000. He co-produced Shadwell Opera's Magic Flute at the Rosslyn Chapel, Edinburgh, (Herald Angel Award 2009). He collaborated in 2011 with Gifford's Circus, writing the lyrics to War And Peace. He also wrote lyrics to the songs in Another Life (2001).

His plays included Five O'Clock Angel, an adaptation of Maria Britneva Five O'Clock Angel: Letters of Tennessee Williams to Maria St. Just, 1948–1982 (1990). He wrote regularly for Country Life magazine (2009 IPC's Writer of the Year). His radio play A La Villa Bab Azzoun, produced by Moving Theatre, won the 2009 Prix Europa. His work for military charities took him to the conflict in Kabul, as well as to Saudi Arabia, Africa, and the Far East.

His translation of The Merry Widow was in Opera North's 2010/11 season, transferring in July 2011 to the Sydney Opera House. Armonico Consort staged his 'Monteverdi's Flying Circus'. In 2011 he directed for Merry Opera his own adaptation of La belle Hélène, Troy Boy, and in 2012, his adaptation of La Traviata. He wrote and co-directed their production of The Magic Flute at the Riverside Studios, London, in 2013. His translation of The Magic Flute was revived in 2012–13 in the Scottish Opera's production, directed by Thomas Allen. In 2013, he translated Salvatore Sciarrino's The Killing Flower (Royal Opera) for Music Theatre Wales. In 2018 he cooperated with Dutch actor and playwright Jon van Eerd on a musical comedy based on Charley's Aunt. His libretto to Anthony Bolton's The Life and Death of Alexander Litvinenko received its first staging at Grange Park Opera in July 2021. His updated version of Donizetti's comic opera Le convenienze ed inconvenienze teatrali (also known in revivals since 1969 as Viva la mamma), but entitled by him Viva la Diva, was performed in July 2022 as part of the Buxton International Festival. He worked as a performer and lyricist with James McConnel; the duo performed regularly at London cabaret venues as Kit and McConnel.

== Personal life and death ==
In 1986, Hesketh-Harvey married actress Catherine Rabett; they had two children. The couple divorced in 2021. His sister is Sarah Sands, former editor of the London Evening Standard and the Today programme on BBC Radio 4. He lived in Norfolk and Cornwall.

Hesketh-Harvey owned All Saints' Church in Stoke Ferry in Norfolk until his death on 1 February 2023, at the age of 65.

Kit Hesketh-Harvey's life and legacy were featured in The Times and The Telegraph, with a piece written by British radio presenter and journalist Libby Purves. Her reflection highlights Hesketh-Harvey’s contributions to British comedy, theatre, and broadcasting.
