= Michael Chance =

English countertenor (born 1955)

Michael Chance CBE
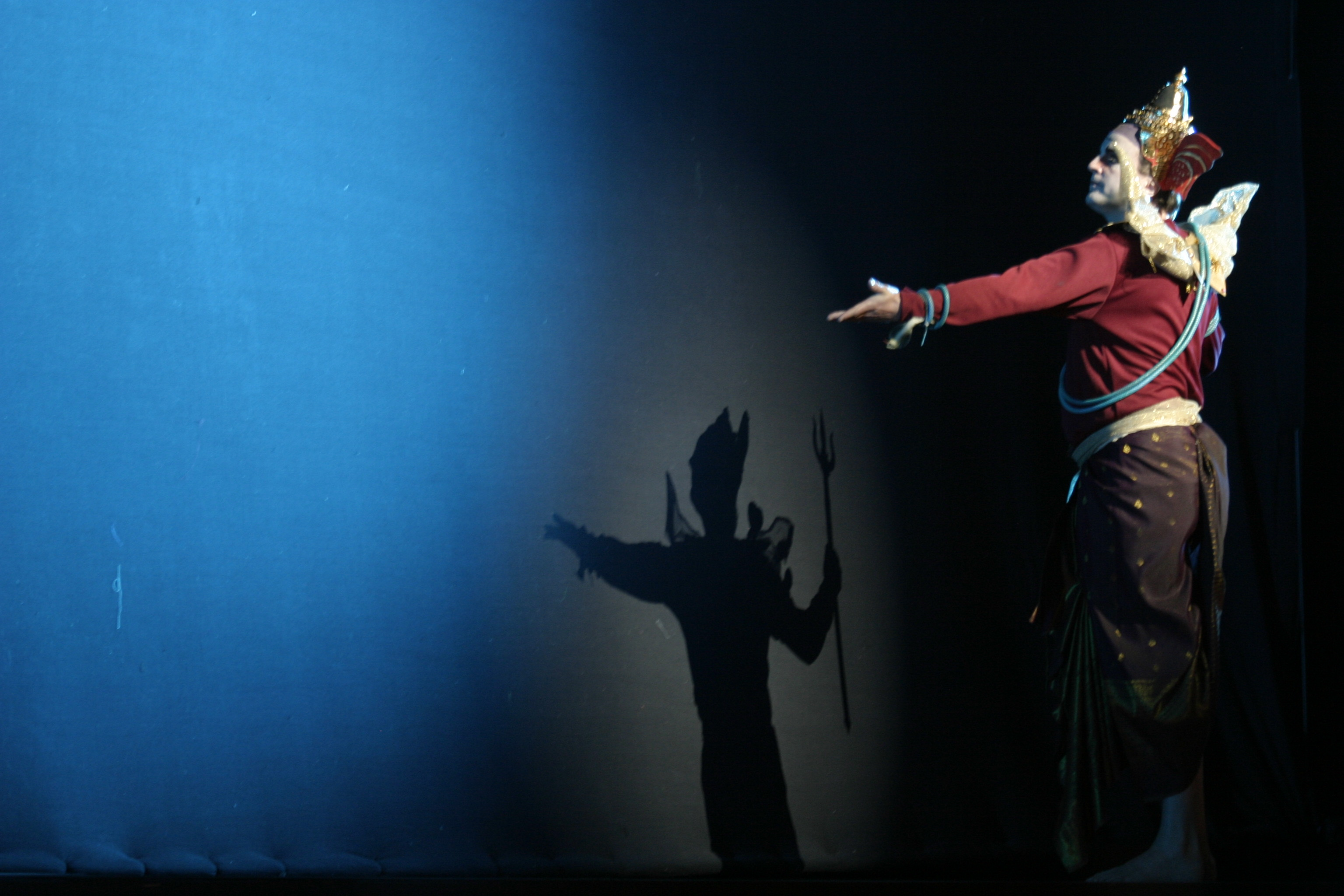
- Chance singing Ganesha in Somtow's opera Ayodhya

Background information
- Born: 7 March 1955 (age 71); Penn, Buckinghamshire, England
- Genre: Classical/Opera
- Website: michaelchancecountertenor.co.uk

Michael Chance CBE (born 7 March 1955) is an English countertenor and the founder and Artistic Director of The Grange Festival.

== Early life ==
Chance was born in Penn, Buckinghamshire, England. He was a chorister of St George's Chapel, Windsor Castle and attended preparatory school at St George's School. He then attended Eton College and King's College, Cambridge.

== Career ==
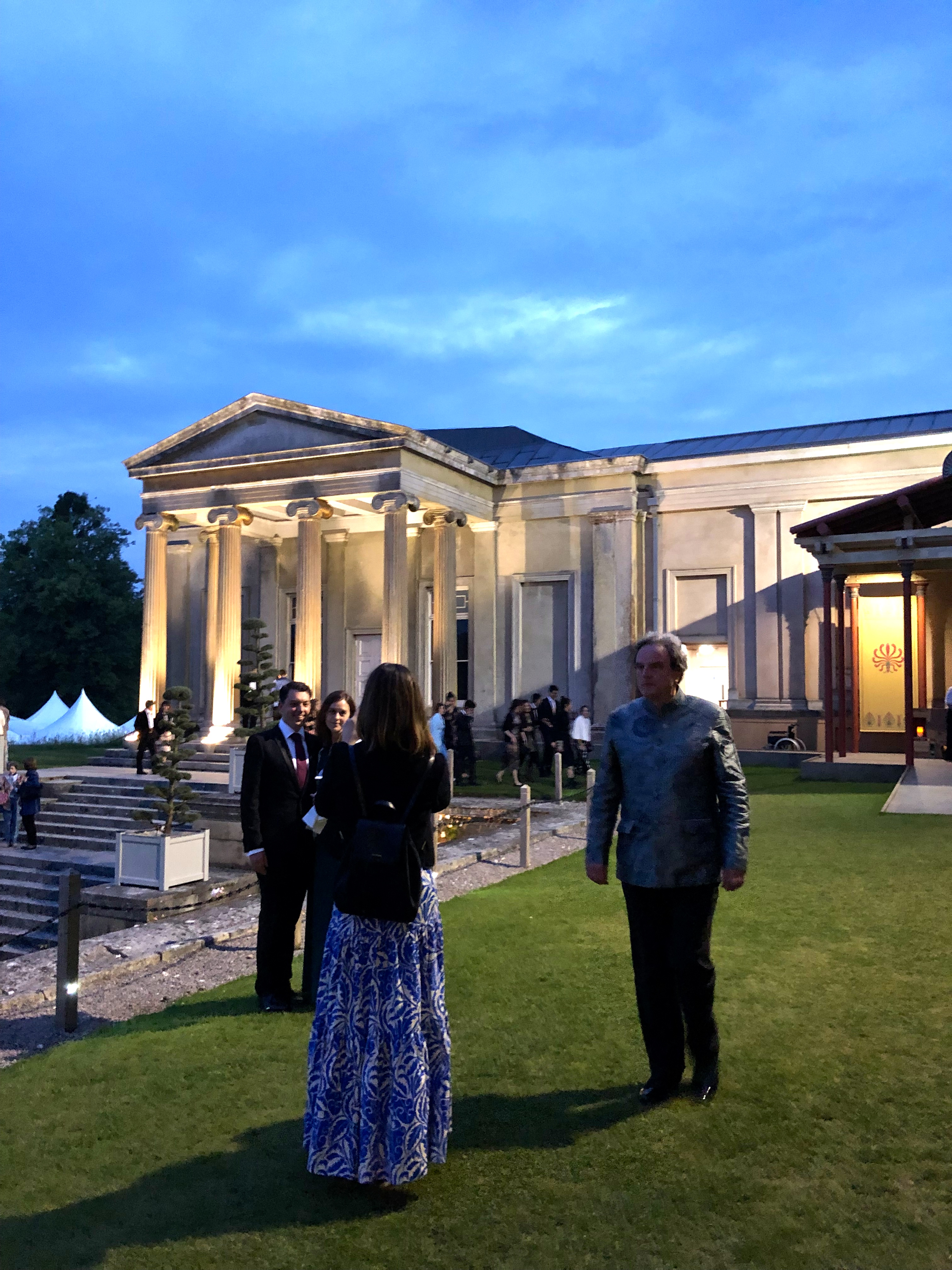
Chance at the Grange Festival in 2019

His first operatic appearance was in the Buxton Festival in Ronald Eyre's staging of Cavalli's Giasone which was followed by appearances in Lyon, Cologne, and three seasons with Kent Opera. Subsequently, he has performed in the Sydney Opera House, Teatro Colon in Buenos Aires, La Scala Milan, Florence, New York, Lisbon, Oviedo, Leipzig, Paris, Brussels, Amsterdam and with Covent Garden, Glyndebourne, and English National Opera.

His roles include the title roles of Orfeo (Gluck), Giasone, Giustino, Rinaldo and Ascanio in Alba, Solomon, Ottone / L’incoronazione di Poppea, Athamas / Semele, Andronico / Tamerlano, Oberon / A Midsummer Night's Dream, Tolomeo / Giulio Cesare and Apollo / Death in Venice. He has had roles written specially for him by Sir Harrison Birtwistle (Orpheus / The Second Mrs Kong) and Judith Weir (A Military Governor / A night at the Chinese Opera). Recent festival appearances include Edinburgh, Aix-en-Provence, BBC Proms in London, Salzburg and Bertarido in a new production of Handel's Rodelinda for the Bayerische Staatsoper in Munich.

His appearances in oratorio and recital have taken him to concert halls all over the world including Carnegie Hall, Concertgebouw, Musikverein, Neue Gewandhaus and Berlin's Philharmonie. He has given recitals in Frankfurt, Vienna, Amsterdam, Israel, New York and London's Wigmore Hall with a variety of programmes, ranging from Elizabethan lute songs to new works commissioned for him. He sings regularly with the viol consort Fretwork and has toured with them to Japan and the United States.

He took part in the project of Ton Koopman and the Amsterdam Baroque Orchestra & Choir to record the complete vocal works of Johann Sebastian Bach.

His belief in extending the countertenor repertoire has prompted new work to be composed for him by Richard Rodney Bennett, Alexander Goehr, Tan Dun, Anthony Powers, John Tavener, and Elvis Costello - amongst others.

His television appearances include A Night at the Chinese Opera, Death in Venice, The Fairy Queen, the three Monteverdi operas with Netherlands Opera, Poppea with Welsh National Opera, Messiah in Dublin with Sir Neville Marriner, and in the Autumn 1999 he was featured by the South Bank Show.

It was announced in October 2015 that Michael Chance would become the first Artistic Director of The Grange Festival, a new opera company established to continue performances at The Grange theatre in Hampshire. Opening in June 2017 with operas by Monteverdi, Mozart, Bizet and Britten, The Grange Festival is one of the few opera companies in the world to be led by an internationally renowned opera singer. In December 2025, he announced that he would be retiring from the festival in 2026.

== Recordings ==
Michael Chance's recordings are numerous and diverse. He received a Grammy Award for his participation in Handel's Semele for Deutsche Grammophon with John Nelson and Kathleen Battle. He has recorded frequently with John Eliot Gardiner, including the Bach Passions and Cantatas, B Minor Mass, Monteverdi's Orfeo and L'Incoronazione di Poppea and Handel's Jephtha, Tamerlano and Agrippina. Other conductors he has recorded with include Trevor Pinnock, Frans Brüggen, Ton Koopman and Nicholas McGegan. On his CD for Deutsche Grammophon, “Michael Chance, the Art of Counter Tenor”, he sings solo alto cantatas by Vivaldi with Trevor Pinnock and The English Concert.

== Honours and accolades ==
Michael was appointed Commander of the Order of the British Empire (CBE) in the 2009 New Year Honours. In December 2024, he was awarded Fellowship of the Royal Northern College of Music.

== Personal life ==
Michael Chance is married to the poet and classicist Irene Noel-Baker. Their son, Alexander Chance, is also an operatic countertenor.
