= Robert Gard (tenor) =

Australian operatic tenor (1927–2021)

Robert Joseph Gard OBE (7 March 1927 – 20 March 2021) was a British-born Australian operatic tenor. He was a leading singer with Opera Australia, and he was particularly associated with the role of Aschenbach in Benjamin Britten's Death in Venice. He premiered the role in Australia, and he sang the role in Tony Palmer's 1981 film of the opera after the originator of the role, Peter Pears, was incapacitated.

== Career ==
Robert Gard was born in Padstow, Cornwall, England on 7 March 1927. He started studying in London in 1944, but in 1945 he was conscripted to the British Army, and sang in some army concerts. After the war, he won a scholarship to the Guildhall School of Music and Drama, where he studied with Dino Borgioli, Walter Hyde and Arthur Reckless.

He sang in such operatic roles as Almaviva (Don Giovanni), the title role in Fra Diavolo, Ernesto (Don Pasquale), and Alfredo (La traviata). In 1956 he appeared in the premiere of Lennox Berkeley's opera Ruth.

In 1961 he travelled to Australia to sing in the musical Lock Up Your Daughters at the Palace Theatre, Sydney. This was followed by other musicals such as Kismet (1961–62) and Show Boat (1963).

In 1966 he first appeared with Opera Australia, in The Merry Widow and The Barber of Seville. His other roles for Opera Australia and other companies such as South Australia State Opera included Don Pasquale, The Magic Flute, Falstaff, Boris Godunov, The Rake's Progress, The Rape of Lucretia, Cavalleria rusticana, Pagliacci, The Marriage of Figaro, The Turn of the Screw, Jenůfa, Die Meistersinger von Nürnberg, The Queen of Spades, Patience, Manon Lescaut, Káťa Kabanová, Peter Grimes, Tristan und Isolde, Fiddler on the Roof, Voss, Salome, Elektra, and Turandot. His final role for Opera Australia was in The Makropoulos Secret at the Sydney Opera House in 2008.

In 1980 he created the role of Aschenbach in the Australian premiere of Death in Venice at the Adelaide Festival.

== Film of Death in Venice ==
Having sung Aschenbach in the Australian premiere in Adelaide in 1980, Robert Gard was approached by Tony Palmer to assist in the film version. The creator of the role, Peter Pears, was to sing Aschenbach but was recovering from a stroke and was unavailable for filming at that time. All of the other major roles were also sung by their creators. Gard was initially hired to assist off-screen, and his voice would not be heard in the final product. However, Pears's recovery proved to be a long-term affair, and Gard was then contracted to perform the role, for the same fee that Pears had accepted.

== Personal life ==
In 1966 he married a fellow singer, Doreen Morrow. In 1970 their daughter Louise died. In 1980 Doreen died of cancer, when he was in the final rehearsals for the Australian premiere of Death in Venice at the Adelaide Festival, in which he sang the role of Aschenbach.

== Death ==
Robert Gard died, aged 94, on 20 March 2021.

== Honours ==
In the 1981 Birthday Honours he was appointed an Officer of the Order of the British Empire (OBE) for his services to opera.

== Awards ==
=== Mo Awards ===
The Australian Entertainment Mo Awards (commonly known informally as the Mo Awards), were annual Australian entertainment industry awards. They recognise achievements in live entertainment in Australia from 1975 to 2016. Robert Gard won one award in that time.

Year	Nominee / work	Award	Result (wins only)
1989	Robert Gard	Operatice Performance of the Year	Won
