= Barbara Robotham =

- Born: Barbara Joyce Robotham; 15 January 1936; Blackpool, England
- Died: 1 July 2013 (aged 77); Blackpool, England
- Occupations: Opera singer (mezzo-soprano); Voice teacher

Barbara Joyce Robotham (15 January 1936 – 1 July 2013) was an English mezzo-soprano opera singer and concert soloist who later became a distinguished voice teacher at the Royal Northern College of Music.

== Life and career ==
The daughter of a Fylde Coast heating engineer, Robotham was born and raised in Blackpool where she was educated at the Collegiate School for Girls. She then studied singing at the Royal Manchester College of Music under Elsie Thurston. She won the college's Curtis Gold Medal and the Imperial League of Opera Prize and in 1961 the Silver Medal at the Concours de Genève. Her early performances included Handel's Alcina in Lisbon, Brahms' Rhapsodie conducted by Malcolm Sargent at the BBC Proms, Britten's Abraham and Isaac at Aldeburgh, the Verdi Requiem, and the Angel in Elgar's The Dream of Gerontius.

In the early 1970s, after her election as an Honorary Fellow of the Royal Manchester College of Music and having sung in over 100 performances and broadcasts in the UK and Europe, Robotham turned to teaching which she considered her true vocation. In 1974 she became a voice professor at Lancaster University, and in 1979 she joined the faculty of the Royal Northern College of Music. Amongst her students there were Amanda Roocroft and Sara Fulgoni. She retired from full-time teaching at the RNCM in 1999, but continued to give master-classes at the college up until her final illness.

Robotham was a long-time resident of Lytham St. Annes where she was the President of the Lytham St Annes Choral Society from 1989 until her death. Her last professional performance was as the mezzo-soprano soloist in the Verdi Requiem which she performed with the society in 1997 at Blackpool Grand Theatre. She died in Blackpool Victoria Hospital at the age of 77 survived by her husband Eric Waite whom she had married in 1958 and their son Jonathan Waite.

== Recordings ==
- William Walton: Orb & sceptre, Te Deum, Crown Imperial – Barbara Robotham (mezzo-soprano); Anthony Rolfe Johnson, (tenor); Brian Rayner Cook, (baritone); City of Birmington Symphony Orchestra and Chorus; Louis Frémaux (conductor). Recorded in 1977. Label: EMI
- Igor Stravinsky: Les Noces, Mass, Cantata – The third item on this album, Stravinsky's Cantata set to medieval English texts is performed by Barbara Robotham (mezzo-soprano); Gerald English (tenor); Prague Philharmonic Chorus; Czech Philharmonic Orchestra; Karel Ančerl (conductor. Recorded in 1967. Label: Supraphon
