= The Life and Death of Alexander Litvinenko =

2020 Anthony Bolton opera about the Russian murdered in London

The Life and Death of Alexander Litvinenko is an opera with music by Anthony Bolton to a libretto by Kit Hesketh-Harvey. Written between 2012 and 2020, and based on the experiences and murder of the former FSB officer and political activist Alexander Litvinenko, it was intended for a premiere at Grange Park Opera in 2020, but this was delayed by the COVID-19 epidemic until 2021.

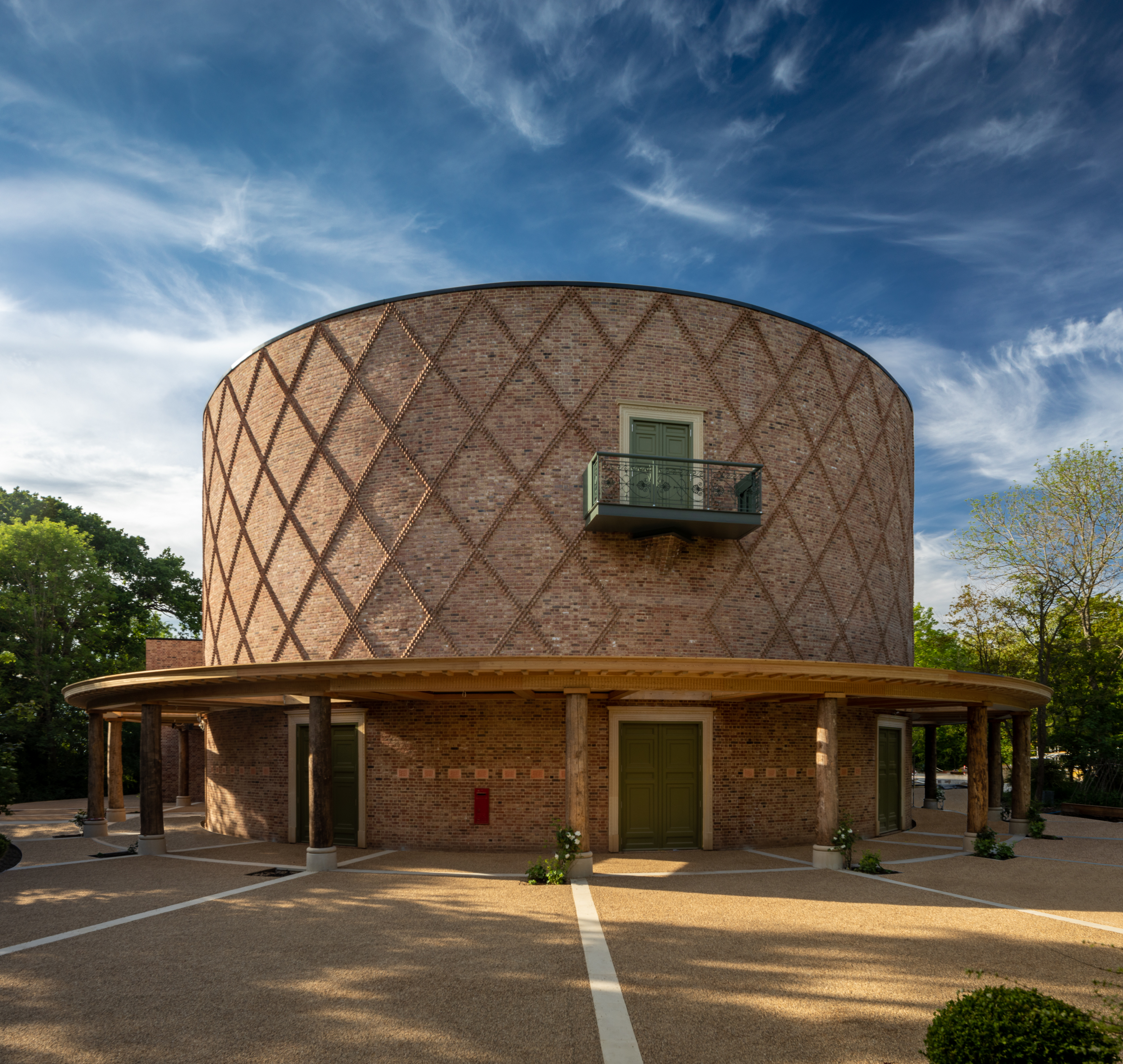
The Theatre in the Woods at Grange Park Opera photo: Richard Lewisohn

== Background ==
Alexander Litvinenko was a Russian former FSB officer turned political dissident, who moved to London in 2000 and was murdered there in December 2006. Bolton, who until his retirement in 2014 was a finance executive and an amateur composer, purchased in 2012 the opera rights to the biography by Litvinenko's wife Marina Death of a Dissident, after reading the book and meeting the author. In 2014 he commenced work on the opera with his librettist Hesketh-Harvey. In 2015 a UK public enquiry determined that Litvinenko had been murdered by poisoning with polonium, naming Andrei Lugovoy as one of those responsible. Bolton has written that, with this, "the final piece of the jigsaw was in place and I could compose in earnest."

The opera's official premiere was on 15 July 2021, and a second performance was given on 17 July, but these had been preceded by a public final rehearsal on 13 July. The opera was directed by Stephen Medcalf and conducted by Stephen Barlow; because of ongoing COVID restrictions, the performances used a recording of the orchestral accompaniment made by the BBC Concert Orchestra in March 2021.

== Roles ==
Role	Voice type	Premiere cast Grange Park Opera, July 15, 2021 (Conductor: Stephen Barlow)
Saha (Alexander) Litvinenko	tenor	Adrian Dwyer
Marina Litvinenko, his wife	soprano	Rebecca Bottone
Boris Berezovsky	baritone	Stephan Loges
Head of KGB	countertenor	James Laing
Anna Politkovskaya	mezzo-soprano	Olivia Ray
Andrei Lugovoy	bass	Edmund Danon
Man	tenor	Joseph Buckmaster

== Synopsis ==
The opera is in two acts each of which contains scenes covering a variety of times and locations.

=== Act I ===
In a prologue, set in a London hospital in 2006, a chorus tells of the chemical polonium and Litvinenko, on his hospital deathbed, gives a final speech.

A variety of scenes include: Litvinenko and his wife reminiscing on their six years of life in Britain and his former work with the FSB; the siege of the Dubrovka Theatre in Moscow in 2002, and the reporting of the event by the reporter Anna Politkovskaya; Litvinenko's experiences in Chechnya during the Second Chechen War; his refusal when ordered to assassinate the oligarch Boris Berezovsky; and his public exposure on Russian TV of state corruption.

=== Act II ===
Berezovsky assists the escape of Litvinenko and his family to the UK. He hosts a party at Blenheim Palace where Litvinenko meets a former colleague, Andrei Lugovoy. Politkovskaya visits Litvinenko in London and they exchange information. Returning to Moscow, Politkovskaya is murdered. Lugovoy meets Litvinenko and poisons him with polonium in his tea. The final scene returns to Litvinenko's final speech and death; his wife sings a lament.

== Reception ==
Critical reception of the opera was muted, although the staging and production were admired. In The Times, Richard Morrison's review was headed "A worthy tale of murder and mayhem - shame about the music", calling the score "drearily atonal" and complaining that Hesketh-Harvey's libretto was "stodgy". The Independent found the opera "overlong and anonymous". Ivan Hewett, in the Daily Telegraph, considered it "exciting but flawed...hobbled by a hectic score". However, in The Stage, Yehuda Shapiro praised the singing and considered it an " ambitious and brave new opera that could be bolder in its realisation".
