= Oliver Gilmour =

British classical music conductor (born 1953)

- Born: 18 December 1953 (age 72)
- Education: Oxford University; Vienna Hochschule für Musik
- Occupation: Conductor
- Spouse: Katherine Grenfell (m. 1981; div. 1985)
- Father: Ian Gilmour
- Relatives: Andrew Gilmour (brother); David Gilmour (brother); Walter Montagu-Douglas-Scott (grandfather)
- Website: olivergilmore.com

Oliver John Gilmour (born 18 December 1953) is a British classical music conductor.

== Biography ==
Born into a political family, Gilmour is the second son of Ian Hedworth John Little Gilmour, Baron Gilmour of Craigmillar, a son of Sir John Little Gilmour, 2nd Bt. and Hon. Victoria Laura Cadogan, and Lady Caroline Margaret Montagu Douglas Scott. Gilmour married Hon. Katherine Grenfell, daughter of Peter George Grenfell, 2nd Baron St Just and Maria Britneva, in 1981. They were divorced in 1985.

== Education and career ==
Gilmour studied at the Vienna Hochschule für Musik with a scholarship after being educated at Oxford University. While in Vienna, he studied conducting and worked with Sir John Pritchard and Leonard Bernstein on various operatic and orchestral projects. Gilmour also studied with Carlos Kleiber. In November 2007, Gilmour was awarded an Honorary Doctorate by the Sofia Music Academy, Sofia, Bulgaria.

Gilmour has close collaboration with Gian Carlo Menotti since they met in Florence in 1980's. Gilmour was promptly invited to the Spoleto Festival for Cosi fan tutte, followed by reviews covering both his great technical and musical accomplishments range from the New York Times to Il Giornale. Critical acclaim ensured Gilmour's and Menotti's continuing co-operation in Western Europe and America on several productions including Le Nozze di Figaro and The Medium and Montezuma.

In 1985, Gilmour made his UK orchestral debut conducting the English Chamber Orchestra after assisting Bernstein on a series of Brahms concerts and recordings at the Vienna Philharmonic. He has also conducted the Scottish Chamber Orchestra, the Orchestra of St John's and the English Sinfonia.

In 1990 he conducted Menotti's production of Le Nozze di Figaro with Renée Fleming. Gilmour was invited to conduct the London Mozart Players' prestigious Mozart Bicentenary Tour of the Far East in 1991, and recorded a commemorative disc of the tour in Taiwan that featured major Asian soloists on traditional Chinese instruments.

In 1992, Gilmour became the Principal Conductor of the Bulgarian State Opera, where he conducted Il trovatore, Aida, Don Carlo, La traviata, Macbeth, L’italiana in Algeria and Il barbiere di Siviglia. He also conducted a new production of Graun's opera seria at the Spoleto Festival in the U.S. in 1995. In 1996, Gilmour and the English Sinfonia launched Inside Music – an educational project with prestigious performances of important classical repertoire, where he and composer David Bedford engaged in a teaching program for 7- to 12-year-old children. In 1999 Gilmour conducted twelve performances of Rigoletto in London and a Gala Concert at Royal Opera House, Covent Garden, London. Since 2000, as artistic director of the Sofia Symphony Orchestra, Gilmour has conducted a wide range of repertoire including Stravinsky's Firebird, Verdi's Requiem, Beethoven symphonies and Mahler's 9th symphony. In February 2006, Gilmour was appointed Chief Guest Conductor of The New Queen's Hall Orchestra, London.

In May 2008, Gilmour, at the invitation of the United Nations, became the first foreign conductor to perform in Baghdad since 2003, leading Iraqi National Symphony Orchestra (INSO) in an historic concert that played to international acclaim, despite power cuts and rocket attacks.

== Recordings ==
Gilmour's recordings include Mozart, Schubert and Schumann symphonies.
