= Grange Park Opera =

English opera company based in Surrey

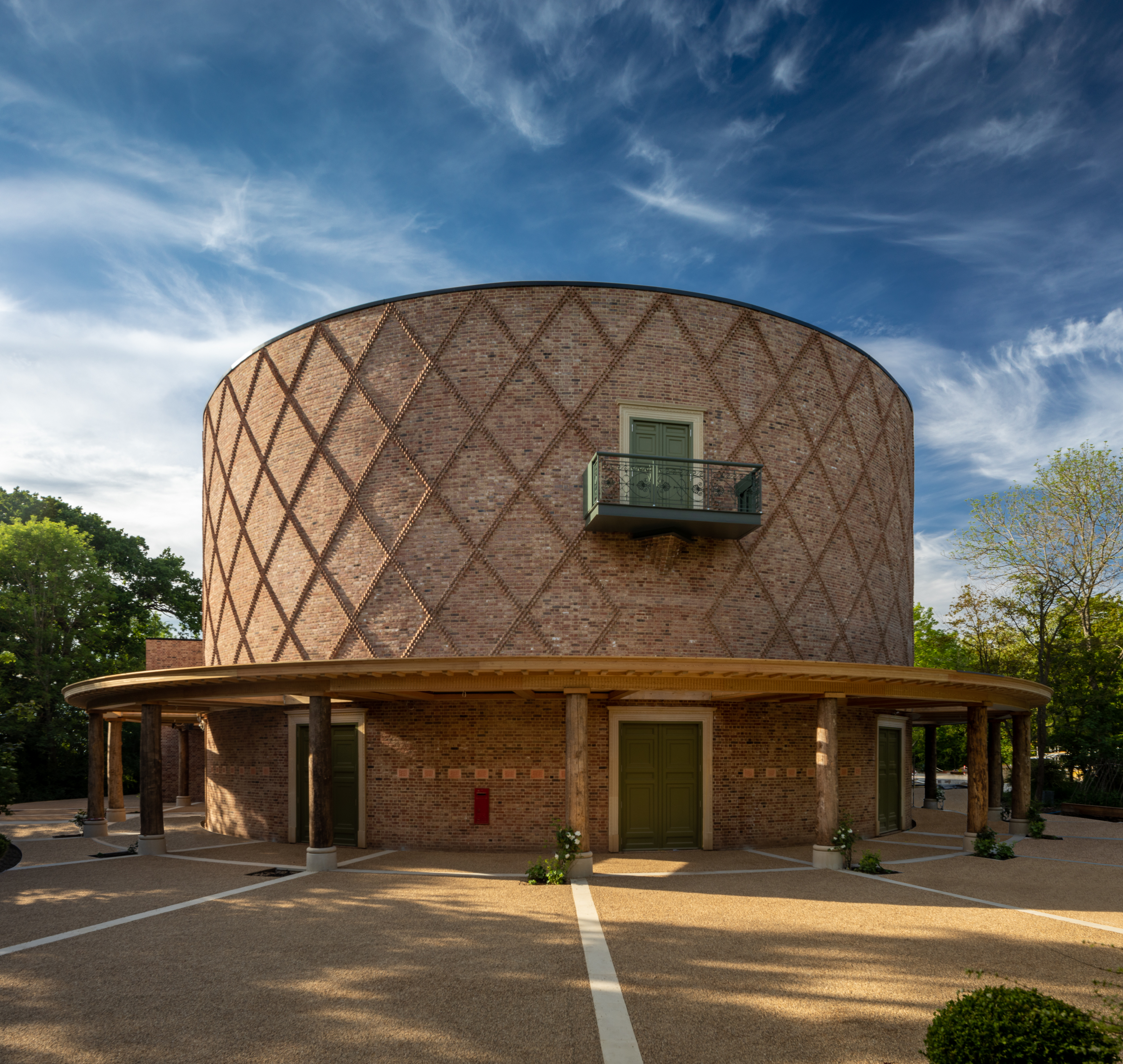
The Theatre in the Woods at Grange Park Opera

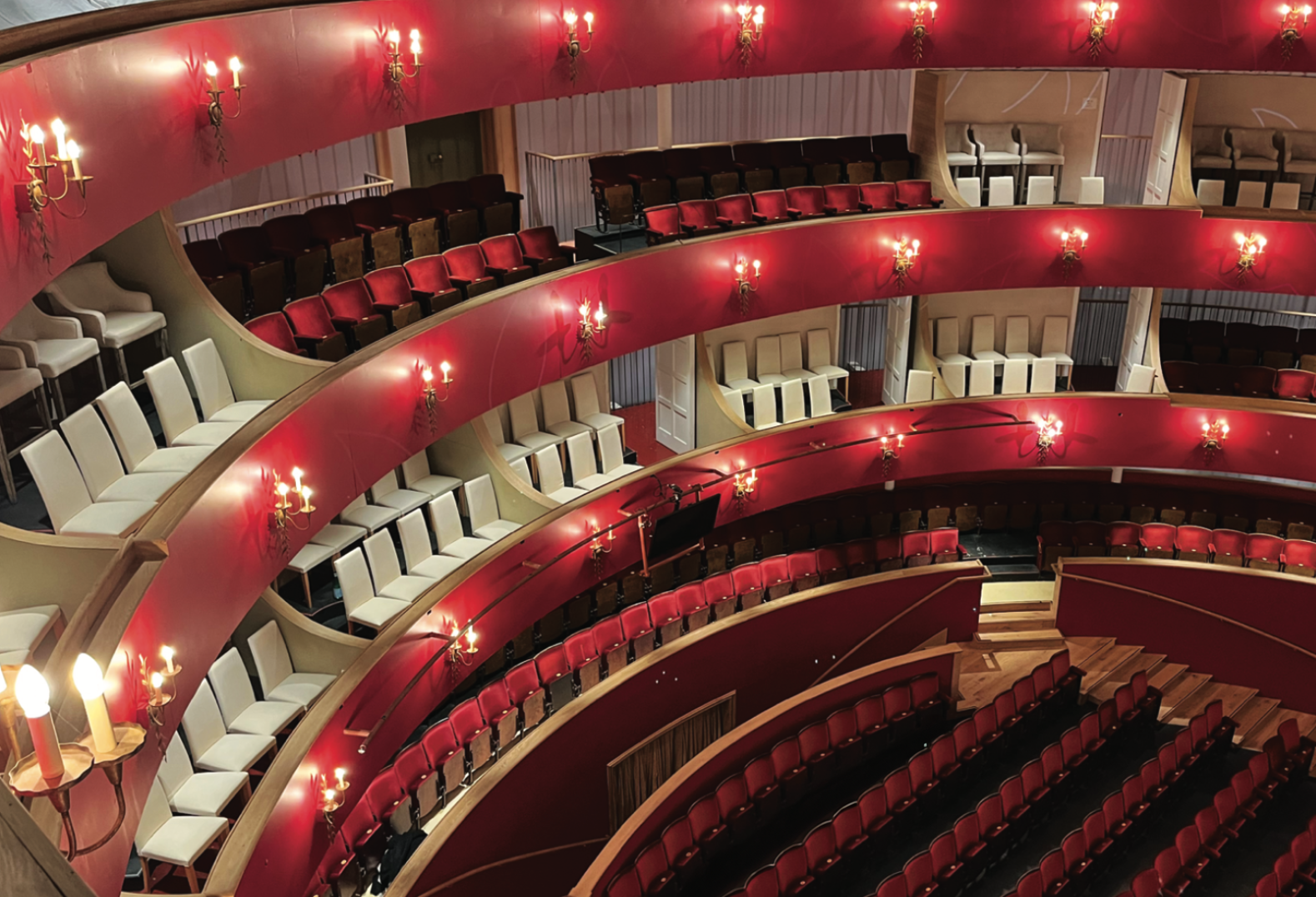
The 700-seat auditorium at Grange Park Opera

Grange Park Opera is a professional opera company and charity whose base is West Horsley Place in Surrey, England. Founded in 1998, the company staged an annual opera festival at The Grange, in Hampshire and in 2016–7, built a new opera house, the 'Theatre in the Woods', at West Horsley Place – the 350-acre estate inherited by author and broadcaster Bamber Gascoigne in 2014.

With five tiers of seating in a horseshoe shape (modelled on La Scala, Milan), the Theatre in the Woods is designed to target an optimum acoustic reverberation of 1.4 seconds.

Singers who have performed with Grange Park Opera include Bryn Terfel, Simon Keenlyside, Joseph Calleja, Claire Rutter, Rachel Nicholls, Bryan Register, Susan Gritton, Wynne Evans, Sally Matthews, Alfie Boe, Robert Poulton, Jeffrey Lloyd-Roberts, Sara Fulgoni, Clive Bayley and Alistair Miles. In recent years, the repertoire has included musicals: Fiddler on the Roof in 2015 and Oliver! in 2016. Fiddler on the Roof was subsequently staged in the Royal Albert Hall as part of the 2015 BBC Proms.

Grange Park Opera is a not-for-profit organisation. Its sister charity Pimlico Opera, founded in 1987, has staged co-productions with prisons since 1991 and taken more than 50,000 members of the public into prison. The Primary Robins project gives singing classes to 2,000 KS2 children a week in schools in deprived areas.

The 2020 season, including Puccini's La Bohème, Martin & Blane's Meet Me in St Louis, Ponchielli's La Gioconda, The Final Fling with The Royal Ballet and the world première of Anthony Bolton's The Life and Death of Alexander Litvinenko, was postponed because of the COVID-19 epidemic. Instead the company produced filmed versions of Maurice Ravel's L'heure espagnole and Benjamin Britten's Owen Wingrave. A new opera by Alex Woolf, The Feast in the Time of Plague, was created, and a number of other activities undertaken. The 2021 season opened with productions of Giuseppe Verdi' Falstaff, La Bohème, Nikolai Rimsky-Korsakov's The Maid of Pskov (in its second, four-act version and presented as Ivan the Terrible), and the postponed premiere of Bolton's Litvinenko opera. Because of COVID restrictions these were given before restricted audiences, and for some productions with recorded, rather than live, orchestra.

== History ==
Grange Park Opera was founded in 1998 by Wasfi Kani and Michael Moody. The newly created charity was party to a three-way lease with English Heritage, guardians of The Grange, Northington and the owners, the Baring family. For the first four seasons, performances took place in the Orangery, into which had been fitted raked seating (the seats themselves came from Covent Garden), stage and orchestra pit. For the 2002 season, the charity made significant changes to the auditorium which was expanded. Seating capacity was increased to 550 with two levels of seating.,

The festival was expanded to a five-week season of three operas in 2000, and to four operas in 2013.

In 2003, Grange Park Opera Hampshire season was extended to Nevill Holt Hall, near Market Harborough in Leicestershire, where a 300-seat theatre was built in the stable courtyard. In 2012 Grange Park Opera handed the Leicestershire season to newly formed Nevill Holt Opera.

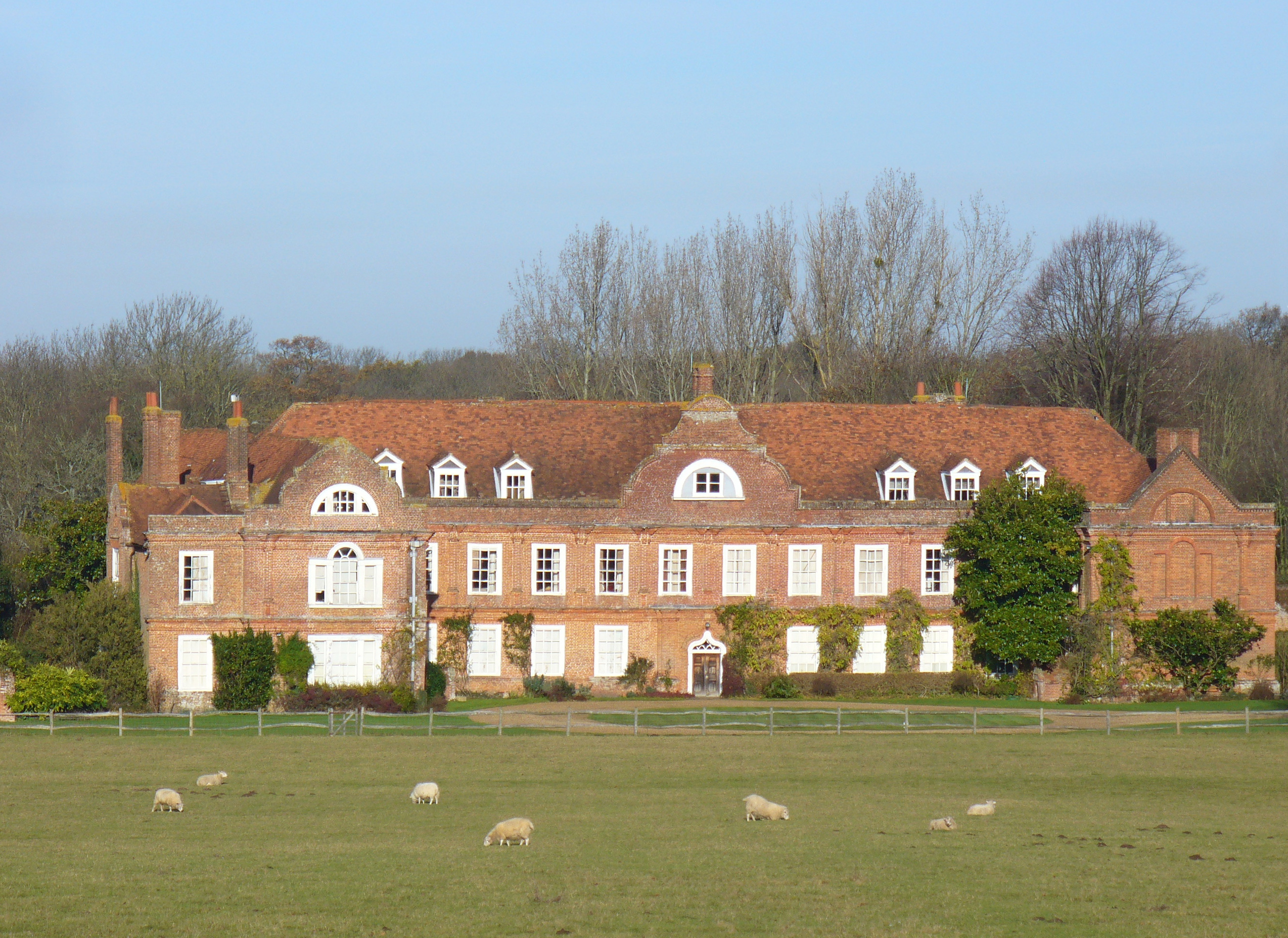
West Horsley Place in Surrey, where Grange Park Opera perform during the summer season

In 2015, the Baring family exercised a break clause in the lease. They attempted to introduce a rent, and limit a future lease to 10 years. However, Grange Park Opera was offered the opportunity to build an opera house close to London at West Horsley Place near Guildford—a 350-acre Surrey estate inherited by author and broadcaster Bamber Gascoigne. Gascoigne placed his inheritance into a charity, the West Horsley Place Trust, which granted Grange Park Opera a 99-year lease at a peppercorn rent. Planning permission for a five-storey opera house, modelled on La Scala by Tim Ronalds Architects, was granted in May 2016 and Phase 1 building work commenced immediately. The opera house was ready in time for the long-scheduled production of Tosca starring Joseph Calleja which premiered on 8 June 2017. Phase 2 continued after the 2017 festival and including the exterior brickwork and a free-standing toilet building, the "Lavatorium Rotundum". Phase 3 included a colonnade whose columns are larch tree trunks.

== See also ==
- List of opera festivals
- Country house opera
- Country house theatre
