= Peter Grenfell, 2nd Baron St Just =

English peer

Peter George Grenfell, 2nd Baron St Just
- Baron St Just
- Tenure: 1943–1984
- Predecessor: Edward Grenfell, 1st Baron St Just
- Successor: Title extinct
- Born: July 22, 1922
- Died: July 22, 1984 (aged 62)
- Residence: Wilbury House
- Spouses: Leslie Nast (m. 1949; div. 1955) Maria Britneva (m. 1956)
- Parents: Edward Grenfell, 1st Baron St Just; Florence Emily Henderson

Peter George Grenfell, 2nd Baron St. Just (22 July 1922 – 1984) was an English peer, a member of the House of Lords from 1943 until his death.

== Life ==
Grenfell was the only son of Edward Grenfell, a partner in Morgan, Grenfell & Co., director of the Bank of England, and Member of Parliament for the City of London, and his wife Florence Emily Henderson. He was educated at Sandroyd School and Harrow School. In July 1935, while he was still there, his father was raised to the peerage as Baron St Just, of St Just in Penwith in the County of Cornwall.

During the Second World War, Grenfell was commissioned as a Lieutenant into the King's Royal Rifle Corps. On 26 November 1941, his father died and he succeeded as Lord St Just, but could not take his seat in the House of Lords until reaching the age of twenty-one two years later.

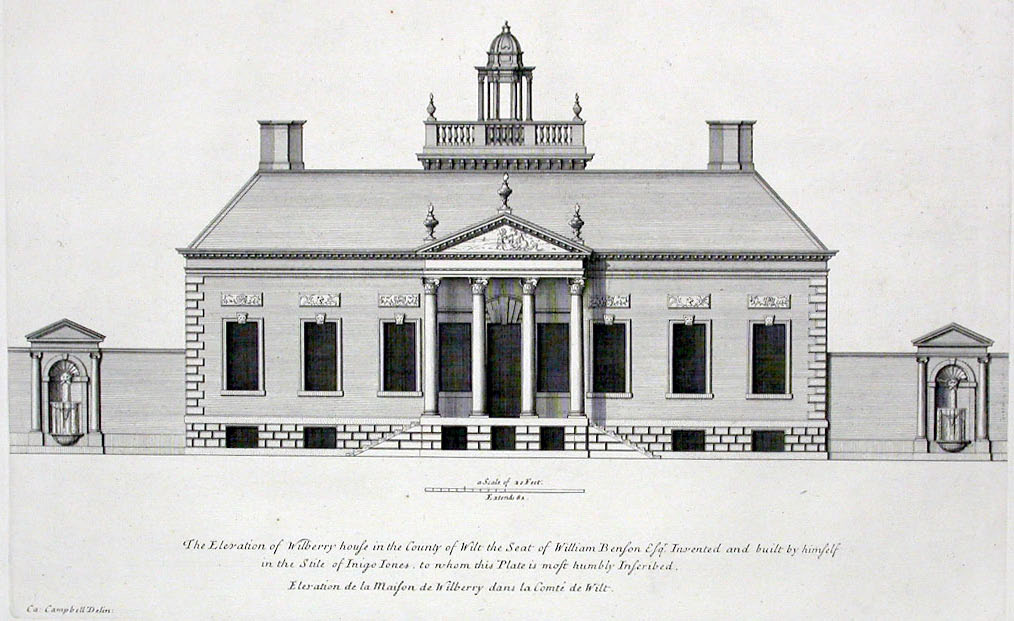
Wilbury House as built in 1710, illustrated in Vitruvius Britannicus

On 1 June 1949, at St James's, Spanish Place, St Just married Leslie Nast, daughter of Condé Nast and Leslie Foster. They were divorced in 1955, and on 25 July 1956 he married secondly Maria Britneva, a Russian-born actress, the daughter of Alexander Britnev, whose mother had brought her to England as a child. They lived at Wilbury House in Wiltshire; Maria continued to live there until her death in 1994.

By his first wife, St Just was the father of Laura Claire Grenfell (born 1950), and by Maria Britneva he had two further daughters, Katherine Grenfell (1957), known as Pulcheria, and Natasha Jeannine Mary Grenfell (1959). His daughter Katherine married Oliver Gilmour.

== Notes ==
Peerage of the United Kingdom
| Preceded by Edward Charles Grenfell | Baron St Just; 1941–1984 | Extinct |
