= The Grange, Northington =

Country house and opera theatre in Hampshire, England

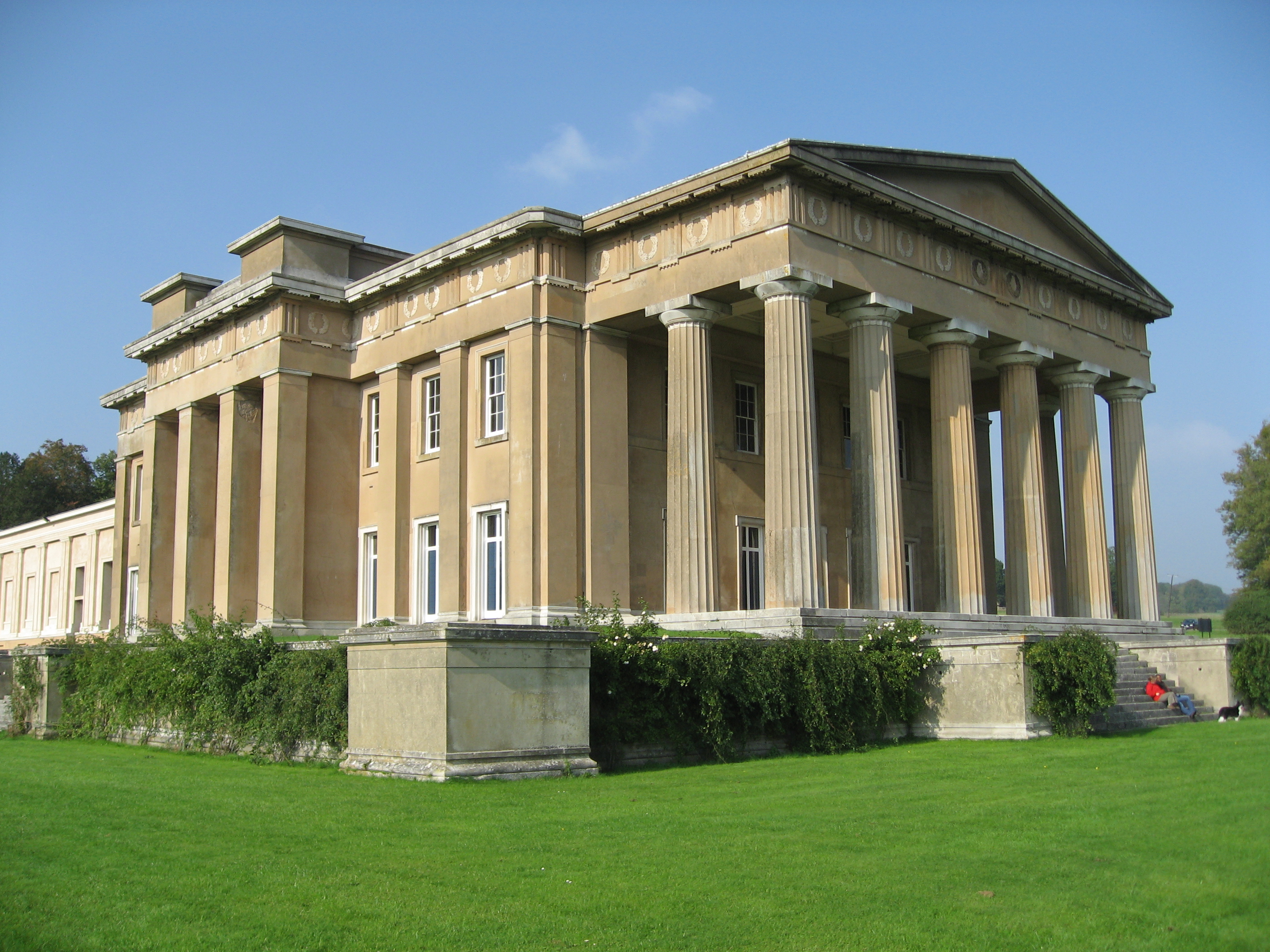

- Location within Hampshire
- 51°7′19.28″N 1°11′56.28″W
- Type: Country house
- Location: Itchen Stoke and Ovington
- OS grid reference: SU 56221 36154.

History
- Built: 1804

Site notes
- Area: Hampshire
- Architect: William Wilkins Charles Robert Cockerell Robert Smirke Frederick Pepys Cockerell
- Architectural style: Greek Revival
- Governing body: English Heritage
- Owner: Mark Baring

Listed Building – Grade I
- Official name: The Grange
- Designated: 5 Dec 1955
- Reference no.: 1095216

Scheduled monument
- Official name: The Grange
- Reference no.: 1001836

National Register of Historic Parks and Gardens
- Official name: The Grange, Northington
- Designated: 31 May 1984
- Reference no.: 1000296

The Grange is a 19th-century country house-mansion and English landscape park near Northington in Hampshire, England. It is currently owned by the Baring family, Barons Ashburton.

English Heritage have a guardianship deed on the scheduled monument and Grade I listed building, with the Grade II* listed gardens and monument's exterior open to the public.

An opera company opened a 500-seat theatre in the house's former orangery in 2004.

== History ==
=== 17th—18th centuries ===
1662: Robert Henley bought the estate and a modest house known as The Grange. In 1665 he commissioned William Samwell to build an impressive four-storey redbrick residence to replace the house.

1764: Robert Henley, 1st Earl of Northington (1708–1772) commissioned Robert Adam to design a kitchen block and an entrance bridge. The same year he laid out a naturalistic English landscape park, including a lake and folly.

1787: The second Earl died childless and his sisters sold the house to the Drummond banking family.

1795: The Grange was leased to George, Prince of Wales as a hunting lodge with over 400 deer in the park.

=== 19th century ===
==== Greek Revival temple ====
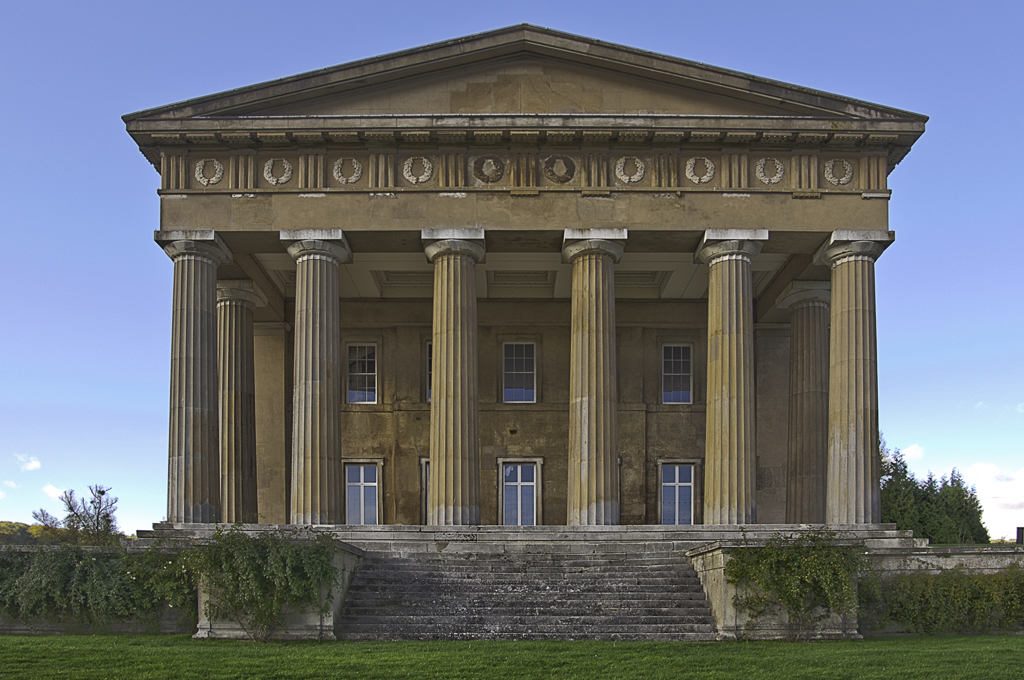
East Elevation

In 1804, Henry Drummond commissioned his friend the architect William Wilkins to transform his brick house into a neoclassical Ancient Greek temple. Wilkins, a promising young architect and antiquary, had been much influenced by his recent travels to Greece and Asia Minor. The massive Doric portico is a copy of the Theseion in Athens and the side elevations imitate the Choragic Monument of Thrasyllus.

Whilst The Grange is sometimes claimed to be the earliest Greek Revival style house in Europe, Benjamin Henry Latrobe, for instance, was using the primitive Greek Doric at Hammerwood Park in 1792. The transformation was largely external - the old house was literally wrapped in Roman cement, a very hard render made from ground flint. This is when the podium visible today was built. What had been ground floor rooms became basement rooms and the main reception rooms which had been on the piano nobile were now at the same level as the podium. The windows of servants’ rooms on the uppermost storey were covered by the entablature of the temple facade, and is partly why it was necessary to extend the house. As at Hammerwood, the giant Doric portico is echoed by a single storey portico behind so as to provide an enhanced perspective when viewed from the hill opposite beyond the lake in the style of the Picturesque.

In 1817, before the works were finished, Drummond sold the house to Alexander Baring, second son of Sir Francis Baring who owned Stratton Park, five miles north of The Grange.

==== Additions ====
On 6 November 1819, Baring ordered from the Birmingham ironmasters Jones & Clark two metallic pine houses to be built in the new walled kitchen garden on the opposite side of the lake about half mile south east of The Grange. He later ordered peach houses and vineries.

In 1820, Alexander Baring commissioned Robert Smirke, a pupil of George Dance, to build the single-storey west wing. He increased the size of the park, extended the flower gardens, and planted many ornamental trees, such as the cedars which survive today. In about 1821 he purchased Buckenham Tofts, an estate near Thetford in Norfolk, with a large neo-classical house.

==== Orangery ====
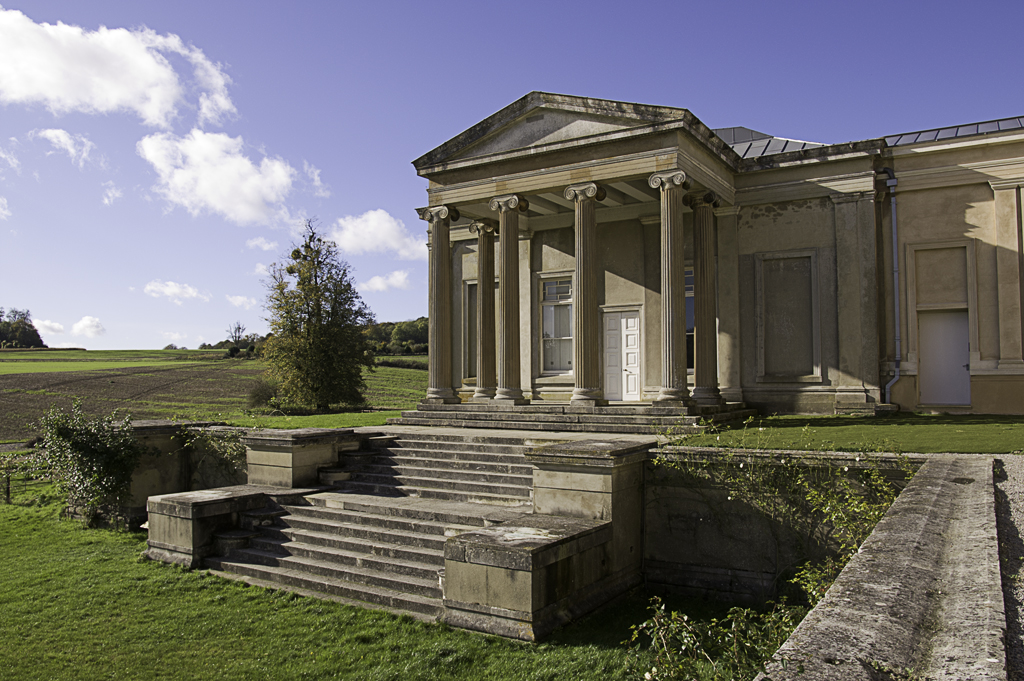
The Conservatory

In January 1823, Baring invited Charles Robert Cockerell to visit and discuss proposed additions. Designs were ready by June and included an elegant dining room (now demolished) and orangery conservatory (approx 80‘ x 50’) with a four-columned Ionic portico on its east elevation.

In December 1823 Baring spent two days discussing the conservatory design with Jones (of Jones & Clark) and the order was placed the following March. There were two large rectangular planting beds running the length of the building with a central and an outer walkway all the way round, paved in Portland stone. Slim hollow cast-iron columns held up the roofs and channelled rainwater into a large reservoir under the portico which supplied the house and the conservatory.

The external elevations were rendered pilasters with full length glazed sashes of rolled iron with copper sash bars. The side lights and the doors at each end were mahogany glazed with British glass.

In 1826, writing in the Gardener's Magazine, Baring’s head gardener, Peter McArthur, gave technical details of the building, the balance of humidity, light and heat, how the beds were constructed, the mix of soils, a list of about 150 plants “the principal and most conspicuous sorts”. The vestibule inside the east end of the conservatory had standing boxes of orange trees, camellias, proteas and magnolias which were brought out onto the terraces for the summer (picture).

Around this time terrace gardens with fountains and balustrades were finished.

In January 1827 Jones & Clark wrote to Baring “We think we may safely venture to affirm that the conservatory at The Grange is not surpassed by anything of the kind in the United Kingdom.”“The whole of the conservatory, with the exception of the brick and stone work, was executed, and its different parts put together at our Birmingham and aftwards [re-]erected in its present situation by our own workmen.” This use of prefabrication was revolutionary and a precursor to Paxton's Crystal Palace.

In June 1828 Cockerell took his new bride, Anna Maria (née Rennie), to The Grange.

==== Further additions and alterations ====
Grange Park photographed in 1870

In 1852, Frederick Pepys Cockerell (son of C. R. Cockerell) added a second storey to Smirke’s west wing. In 1868, John Cox further extended the buildings and modernised the interiors. This was the heyday of the house - with a staff of more than a hundred and exuberant house parties attended by Thomas Carlyle, Alfred, Lord Tennyson and other society figures. The grand hostess at this time was Lady Ashburton who was renowned for her wit and intelligence.

In 1890, Francis Baring, the 5th Lord Ashburton, sold Bath House in Piccadilly, and to accommodate his paintings, converted the orangery into a picture gallery which doubled as a ballroom. Cockerell’s full-height external window sashes were removed and walls built in their place. The interior and planted beds were removed and the walls were plastered and fitted with oak dado panelling and a new flat partly glazed ceiling inserted.

=== 20th century ===
==== Wallach era ====
In 1934 The Grange and 600 acres of the park were sold to Charles Wallach whose fortune was from the medicinal use of paraffin and other petroleum by-products. The rest of the estate remained in the ownership of the Baring family.

In the October 1935 edition of Antique Collector it was stated that The Grange “which seemed doomed to become derelict” had “during the last 18 months been transformed into a palace of art treasures entirely fitting its former glory”. The picture gallery “formerly a ball-room had been debased to a badminton court before Mr Wallach adapted it to its present purpose.

In 1943 Wallach allowed the American Army to use the main house, and soldiers of the 47th US Infantry enjoyed a large Christmas party in the picture gallery. On 24 March 1944 the Prime Minister Winston Churchill and U.S. General Dwight D. Eisenhower met at The Grange to discuss the Invasion of Normandy.

==== Baring family returns ====
In 1964 Charles Wallach died and the main house and 600-acre park were bought again by John Baring, now 7th Lord Ashburton, who promptly demolished the rear wing of the main building. In July 1972, he "held an auction to strip the house of all its saleable fittings: the staircase, doors, fireplaces and marble cladding were all removed". He then proposed to tear down the remainder of the house. However, the furious correspondence in The Times persuaded Baring to pass the house into the voluntary guardianship of the Department of the Environment with a commitment from the Government to pay for restoration to enable public access.

The Government quickly reneged on this and neglected the house until 1978 when, following a vigorous campaign by the conservation group SAVE Britain's Heritage, the Government was forced to honour its pledge and, at a cost of £500,000, stopped the decline and secured the house, although there was by then significant loss of interiors as well as the missing parts of the building.

== Opera house ==
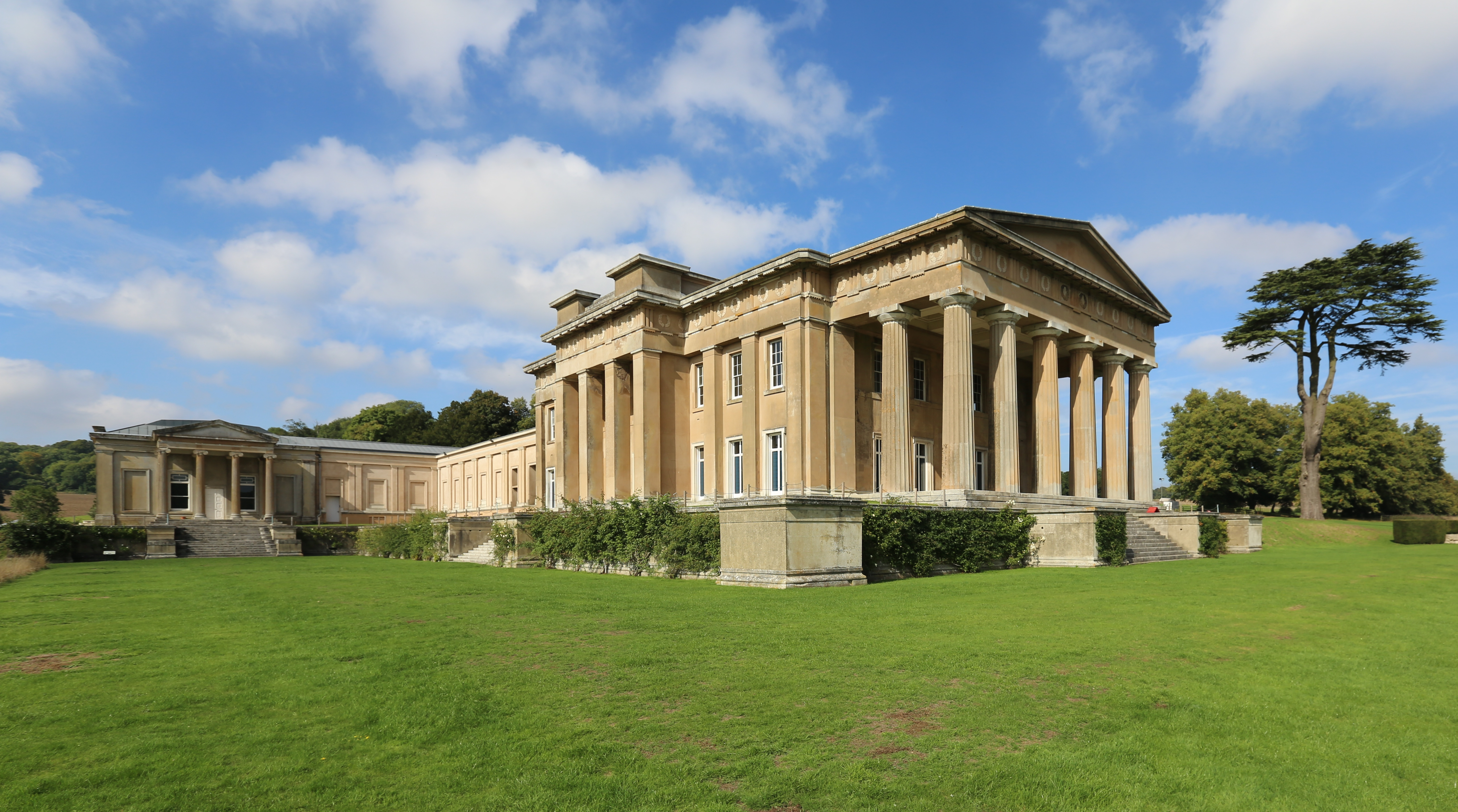
The Grange from the south-east 2013

Martha Fiennes used The Grange for her film Onegin, starring her brother Ralph Fiennes, in 1998. The picture gallery served as Onegin's library.

Grange Park Opera staged its first summer festival at The Grange in 1998.

A new theatre was designed by Studio E Architects in 2002, to convert the interior of the former orangery-picture gallery for performances. The project won the RIBA Award 2004, RIBA Conservation Commendation 2004, Georgian Group Award for Best New Building in a Georgian Context 2004 and was shortlisted for the Crown Estate Conservation Award 2004.

In 2015, the Baring family exercised a break clause in the lease. They attempted to introduce a rent, and limit a future lease to 10 years. Negotiations broke down, and Grange Park Opera left the Grange Estate after the 2016 season. A new opera company led by Michael Chance was launched to continue performances at The Grange. The Grange Festival opened on 7 June 2017 with operas by Monteverdi, Mozart, Bizet and Britten.

In 2018 The Grange Festival staged Dance@TheGrange curated by Director of Dance Wayne McGregor featuring Alessandra Ferri alongside dancers from Studio Wayne McGregor and The Royal Ballet.

== Weddings and Events ==
The house and gardens are also available to rent for parties, corporate events, and weddings. Grange Park Opera staged opera at The Grange every Summer from 1998 to 2016. In June 2017 The Grange Festival became the resident opera company.

== See also ==
- Grade I listed buildings in Hampshire
