= Anthony Bolton =

English investment fund manager (born 1950)

- Born: 7 March 1950 (age 76)
- Education: Stowe School; Trinity College
- Occupation: Investment fund manager

Anthony Bolton (born 7 March 1950) is a former investment fund manager and successful investor in the United Kingdom. He managed the Fidelity Special Situations fund from December 1979 to December 2007, and then managed Fidelity China Special Situations PLC, a London Stock Exchange listed investment trust, until his retirement in April 2014. He is also a musician and a composer.

== Education and career ==
Educated at Stowe School and Trinity College, Cambridge, Bolton left with a degree in engineering and business studies. He pursued a career in the city where, age 29, he was recruited by Fidelity as one of their first London based investment managers. He is now President of Investments at Fidelity International Limited and manager of Fidelity China Special Situations PLC.

Bolton began managing Special Situations (a UK equity OEIC) when he joined Fidelity in 1979 and continued until 2007. He managed other funds alongside Special Situations during this time. From November 1985 to December 2002, he managed the Fidelity European Fund (a European equity OEIC). He managed Fidelity European Growth fund (a European equity SICAV) from 1990 to 2003, Fidelity European Values PLC (a UK-listed investment trust) from 1991 to 2001 and Fidelity Special Values PLC (also a UK-listed investment trust) from 1994 to 2007.

In 2006 his Special Situations Fund was split. The success of the fund had brought in so much money from investors, it had become the UK's largest open ended fund (OEIC) and it was feared that the fund was becoming too big to manage successfully. The fund was split into UK and Global Special Situations funds, with the Global fund passed to Jorma Korhornen and the UK fund continuing under Bolton's stewardship until the end of 2007. With Bolton's step back from fund management, many questioned whether the fund could continue to outperform the market in future. Sanjeev Shah succeeded Anthony Bolton as the manager of the UK Special Situations Fund in January 2008. The fund remained in the first decile over the first two years of Shah's tenure. Bolton's former funds suffered amongst the worst redemptions in 2007. Investors withdrew £335m from the Special Situations fund and £508m from Global Special Situations. However, redemptions in both funds slowed significantly in 2008 and in March 2010, at £3 billion, the UK fund was almost back to the same size as when Bolton stepped down. Over the 28-year period of Bolton's management, the fund achieved annualised growth of 19.5%, well in excess of the 13.5% growth of the wider stock exchange, turning a £1,000 investment into £147,000. When he ceased managing funds in 2007, Bolton took a full-time role mentoring and developing newer investment managers.

== Fidelity China Special Situations ==
In 2009 he announced his return to fund management and in April 2010 moved to Hong Kong to begin managing the newly launched Fidelity China Special Situations PLC, an investment trust listed on the London Stock Exchange.

The fund attracted high levels of investment, being fully subscribed at £460 million on issue in April 2010, and was initially trading at a premium to its net asset value due to high demand for the shares, whereas most investment trusts trade at a discount (in reflection of the fact that management costs damage returns). A second share issue in February 2011 was also fully subscribed, raising £166.5 million.

Although initially performing well, the fund suffered in 2011, and as of 14 November 2011 it was 5th out of 6 trusts in its sector, losing 34% of its value in 2011 and trading at 78p, well below its £1 initial flotation price. By the time in 2014 that Bolton handed over the management of the Trust which continued his strategy the share price had recovered and had outperformed the China Index over his four year tenure.

== Compositions ==
Whilst at Trinity, Cambridge, reading Engineering, Bolton, a pianist and cellist, studied composition with Nicholas Maw. In 2002 Bolton resumed composition studies, taking lessons from Colin Matthews and Julian Anderson.

Chamber works include a solo cello suite, wind quintet, octet (for the same combination as Schubert's) and Paesaggi, a five-movement piece for 16 players. Vocal works include two song cycles: Black Sea for tenor to poems by Canadian Mark Strand and Songs from the Middle Kingdom for soprano on eight ancient Chinese poems. The Save the Children anniversary in St Paul's included Bolton's anthem Children of Earth. A Garland of Carols (upper voices, harp), modelled on Britten's Ceremony of Carols, premièred at St Paul's Cathedral in 2006. A seven-movement orchestral suite The Seven Wonders of the Ancient World was composed 2005- 2015.

In 2014 he began composing a two-act opera The Life and Death of Alexander Litvinenko to a libretto by Kit Hesketh-Harvey. The world premiere took place at Grange Park Opera on July 15, 2021, having been preceded there by a public rehearsal on July 13.

Bolton cites Benjamin Britten as one of his main compositional influences.

== Private life ==
Bolton has three children. The family charity, The Boltini Trust, is a supporter of contemporary music.

In September 2009 he was a guest on Private Passions, the biographical music discussion programme on BBC Radio 3.

== Bibliography ==
- Bolton, Anthony; Davis, Jonathan (1 November 2006). Investing with Anthony Bolton (2nd ed.). Petersfield, Hampshire: Harriman House. ISBN 978-1-905641-11-6.
- Bolton, Anthony (2 April 2009). Investing Against the Tide: Lessons from a Life Running Money. Financial Times/ Prentice Hall. ISBN 978-0-273-72376-9.
