= Catherine Rabett =

British actress (born 1960)

- Born: London, England
- Occupation: Actress
- Years active: 1981–present
- Spouse: Kit Hesketh-Harvey (m. 1986; div. 2021)
- Children: 2

Catherine Rabett, sometimes credited as Katie Rabett, is a British actress.

She played Cecily "Cissy" Meldrum in the BBC sitcom You Rang, M'Lord? (1988–1993). She was a member of the Second Generation dance group, and later Hot Gossip, Arlene Phillips's dance group, which regularly performed on The Kenny Everett Video Show. In the mid-1980s she had a brief romance with Prince Andrew (now known as Andrew Mountbatten-Windsor). Rabett was married to comic performer and scriptwriter Kit Hesketh-Harvey from 1986 until 2021; they had two children.

== Theatre roles ==
- Sheila Wendice in Dial M for Murder, on tour and in the West End including Theatre Royal, Bath in 1996 and again in the West End in 2016
- Various characters in The Thirty-Nine Steps, at the Everyman Theatre, Cheltenham in 2000

== Selected film and television roles ==
=== Film ===
- Fords on Water (1983) – Madeline, directed by Barry Bliss
- Real Life (1984) – Kate, directed by Francis Megahy
- The Living Daylights (1987) – Liz, an American CIA intelligence operative, directed by John Glen
- Frankenstein Unbound (1990) – Elizabeth Levenza, Victor's fiancée, directed by Roger Corman

=== Television ===
- The Kenny Everett Television Show (1981) – Sexy girls
- Minder, Windows (1984) – Louise
- The Adventures of Sherlock Holmes – The Adventure of the Crooked Man (1984) – Young Nancy Barclay/Devoy
- C.A.T.S. Eyes, Goodbye Jenny Wren (1985) – Jenny Kenwright
- Auf Wiedersehen, Pet, Another Country – Carol Pringle
- Fresh Fields, Happy Returns (1986) – Monica
- Chance in a Million, The Blessing (1986) – WPC Madigan
- Maurice (1987) – Pippa Durham
- Confessional (1989) – Jane Barclay
- Bergerac, All for Love (1991) – Jane
- You Rang, M'Lord? (1988–1993) – Cissy Meldrum
- Agatha Christie's Poirot – Hercule Poirot's Christmas (1995) – Lydia Lee
