= Maurice (1987 film) =

- Theatrical release poster
- Directed by: James Ivory
- Screenplay by: Kit Hesketh-Harvey; James Ivory
- Based on: Maurice by E. M. Forster
- Produced by: Ismail Merchant
- Starring: James Wilby; Hugh Grant; Rupert Graves; Denholm Elliott; Simon Callow; Billie Whitelaw; Barry Foster; Judy Parfitt; Phoebe Nicholls; Ben Kingsley
- Cinematography: Pierre Lhomme
- Edited by: Katherine Wenning
- Music by: Richard Robbins
- Production companies: Merchant Ivory Productions; Film Four International
- Distributed by: Enterprise Pictures Limited
- Release dates: 5 September 1987 (Venice); 15 September 1987 (Toronto); 13 November 1987 (United Kingdom)
- Running time: 140 minutes
- Country: United Kingdom
- Language: English
- Budget: £1.58 million
- Box office: $2.6–3.3 million

Maurice is a 1987 British romantic drama film directed by James Ivory, based on the 1971 novel Maurice by E. M. Forster. The film stars James Wilby as Maurice, Hugh Grant as Clive and Rupert Graves as Alec. The supporting cast includes Denholm Elliott as Dr Barry, Simon Callow as Mr Ducie, Billie Whitelaw as Mrs Hall, and Ben Kingsley as Lasker-Jones.

The film was produced by Ismail Merchant via Merchant Ivory Productions and Film Four International, and written by Ivory and Kit Hesketh-Harvey, with cinematography by Pierre Lhomme. It is a tale of gay love in the restrictive and repressed culture of Edwardian England. The story follows its main character, Maurice Hall, through university, a tumultuous relationship, struggling to fit into society, and ultimately being united with his life partner.

== Plot ==
During a school trip to the beach, Maurice Hall, an 11-year-old schoolboy, receives instructions about the "sacred mystery" of sex from his teacher Mr. Ducie, who wants to explain to the fatherless boy the changes he will experience in puberty. Maurice is left feeling removed from the depiction of marriage with a woman.

Years later in 1909, Maurice is attending the University of Cambridge, where he strikes up a friendship with two fellow students: the aristocratic eccentric Viscount Risley and the rich and handsome Clive Durham. Clive falls in love with Maurice and surprises him by confessing his feelings. At first, Maurice reacts with horror, but he soon realises that he feels the same. The two friends begin a love affair but, at Clive's insistence, their relationship remains non-sexual. To go further, in Clive's opinion, would diminish them both. The upper-class Clive has a promising future in politics ahead of him and does not want to risk losing his social position. Their close relationship continues after Maurice leaves Cambridge and begins a new career as a stockbroker in London.

The two friends keep their feelings secret but are frightened when Risley is arrested and sentenced to six months' hard labour after soliciting sex from a soldier. Clive, afraid of being exposed as homosexual, breaks up with Maurice. After his return from a trip to Greece, Clive, under pressure from his widowed mother, makes overtures toward Maurice's sister until a furious Maurice intercedes. He tries to rekindle their relationship, but Clive spurns him decisively. Clive soon marries a naïve rich girl named Lady Anne Scott and settles into a life of domesticity at his estate, Pendersleigh.

Maurice seeks the help of his family physician, Dr. Barry, who gives him a physical examination and dismisses Maurice's doubts as "rubbish". Maurice then turns to Dr. Lasker-Jones, who tries to "cure" his homosexual longings with hypnosis. During his visits to Pendersleigh, Maurice attracts the attention of Alec Scudder, the under-gamekeeper who is due to emigrate to Argentina. Maurice not only fails to notice Alec's interest in him, but initially treats him with contempt. This does not discourage Alec, who watches Maurice's window at night. Simcox, the butler at Pendersleigh, suspecting the true nature of Maurice and Clive's past relationship, hints to Alec about Maurice's nature. One night, Alec climbs a ladder and enters Maurice's bedroom through an open window. He kisses Maurice, who is completely taken by surprise, but does not resist his sexual advances.

After their first night together, Maurice receives a letter from Alec proposing they meet at the Pendersleigh boathouse. Maurice wrongly believes that Alec is blackmailing him and returns to Lasker-Jones, who warns Maurice that England is a country that "has always been disinclined to accept human nature" and advises him to emigrate to a country where homosexuality is no longer criminal, like France or Italy. When Maurice fails to appear at the boathouse, Alec travels to London and visits him at his offices, causing some surprise amongst Maurice's colleagues.

Maurice and Alec go to the British Museum to talk, and the blackmail misunderstanding is resolved. Maurice begins to call Alec by his first name. They spend the night together in a hotel room, and as Alec leaves the next morning he explains that his departure for Argentina is imminent and they will not see each other again. Maurice goes to the port to give Alec a parting gift, only to discover that Alec has missed the sailing. Maurice goes to Pendersleigh and confesses to Clive his love for Alec. Clive, who was hoping Maurice would marry, is bewildered at Maurice's account. The two separate and Maurice goes to the boathouse looking for Alec, who is there waiting for him. Alec has left his family and abandoned his plans to emigrate to stay with Maurice, telling him, "Now we shan't never be parted".

At home with his wife, Clive's preparations for bed are interrupted by reminiscences about his time with Maurice.

== Cast ==
- James Wilby as Maurice Hall
- Hugh Grant as Clive Durham
- Rupert Graves as Alec Scudder, under-gamekeeper
- Denholm Elliott as Doctor Barry
- Simon Callow as Mr. Ducie
- Billie Whitelaw as Mrs. Hall
- Barry Foster as Dean Cornwallis
- Judy Parfitt as Mrs. Durham
- Phoebe Nicholls as Lady Anne Scott, married Durham
- Ben Kingsley as Dr. Lasker-Jones
- Patrick Godfrey as Simcox, Durham's butler
- Mark Tandy as Viscount, Lord Risley
- Kitty Aldridge as Kitty Hall
- Helena Michell as Ada Hall
- Catherine Rabett as Pippa Durham
- Peter Eyre as Reverend Borenius
- Orlando Wells as Maurice as a boy
- Julian Wadham as Hull
- Richard Warner as Judge
- Helena Bonham Carter as woman at cricket match (uncredited)
- Mark Payton as Chapman
- Matthew Sim as Featherstonhaugh

== Production ==
=== Background ===
E. M. Forster wrote Maurice in 1913–14, and revised it in 1932 and again in 1959–1960. Written as a traditional Bildungsroman, or novel of character formation, the plot follows the title character as he deals with the problem of coming of age as a homosexual in the restrictive society of the Edwardian era. Forster, who had based his characters on real people, was keen that his novel should have a happy ending. The author did not intend to publish the novel while his mother was alive, but he showed the manuscript to selected friends, such as Christopher Isherwood. Forster resisted publication during his lifetime because of public and legal attitudes to homosexuality. He was also ambivalent about the literary merits of his novel. A note found on the manuscript read: "Publishable, but worth it?" The novel was only published in 1971 after Forster's death. It is considered one of his minor works, in comparison with his novels Howards End (1910) and A Passage to India (1924).

James Ivory was interested in making a screen adaptation after the critical and box office success he achieved with another of Forster's novels, A Room with a View. While involved in this earlier project Ivory had read all of Forster's books, and eventually came to Maurice. "I thought," Ivory said, "that it was interesting material and would be enjoyable to make – and also something we could make in that it wouldn't require too much organization and wouldn't cost all that much." The situation it explores seemed to him to be still relevant: "People's turmoil and having to decide for themselves how they want to live and what their true feelings are and whether they're going to live honestly with them or deny them. That's no different. Nothing's any easier, for young people. I felt it was quite relevant."

In his will, Forster left the rights to his books to King's College, Cambridge, which has a self-governing board of fellows of the college. They were initially reluctant to give permission to film Maurice, not because of the subject matter of the novel, but because it was considered an inferior work, and a film that called attention to it would not enhance Forster's literary reputation. Ismail Merchant, the producer of the film, conferred with them and was very persuasive. They were favourably impressed with the adaptation by Merchant Ivory Productions of A Room with a View and relented.

=== Writing ===
Ivory's usual writing partner, Ruth Prawer Jhabvala, was unavailable because she was busy writing her novel Three Continents. Ivory wrote the screenplay with Kit Hesketh-Harvey, who had become connected with Merchant Ivory Productions through his sister, journalist and author Sarah Sands (born Sarah Harvey), who was then the wife of Julian Sands, the leading man in A Room with a View. Hesketh-Harvey had previously written documentaries for the BBC. He had attended Tonbridge School and Cambridge University, where Forster was educated, and knew the background. Ivory later said, "What Kit brought to the script was his social background. He went to Cambridge and a fancy prep school. His knowledge of the British upper middle class, that was incredibly useful – the dialect, the speech, the slang, and so many other things. As an American, I could not have possibly written the script without him."

Jhabvala reviewed the script and suggested changes. On her advice, Clive Durham's unconvincing conversion to heterosexuality during a trip to Greece was justified by creating an episode in which Clive's university friend Risley is arrested and imprisoned after a homosexual entrapment, which frightens Clive into marrying.

=== Casting ===
Julian Sands, who had played the male lead in Merchant Ivory's A Room with a View, was originally cast in the title role, but backed out at the last minute. John Malkovich was due to take the role of Lasker-Jones. He had become a friend of Sands while both were making The Killing Fields. After Sands left the project Malkovich lost interest in the film and was replaced by Ben Kingsley.

James Wilby had auditioned for the role of Clive Durham's brother-in-law. When Sands left the project, Ivory considered two unknown actors for the role of Maurice: Wilby and Julian Wadham. Since he had already cast the dark-haired Hugh Grant as Clive, Ivory decided on the blond Wilby over the dark-haired Wadham, who was given a role as one of Maurice's stockbroker friends.

Grant, who later found international stardom with Four Weddings and a Funeral, had previously appeared in only one film, Privileged. He was doing revue comedy at the time and had lost interest in professional acting when Celestia Fox, the casting director, sent Grant to Ivory who immediately gave him the role of Clive. It helped that Grant and Wilby had worked together in Grant's first film, made at Oxford. Rupert Graves was cast as Alec Scudder, Maurice's working-class lover. He had appeared as Lucy Honeychurch's young brother in A Room with a View, a performance with which he was unsatisfied, and so he appreciated the opportunity to deliver a better performance.

The supporting cast included veterans Denholm Elliott as Dr. Barry and Simon Callow as the pedagogue Mr. Ducie, both from A Room with a View; Kingsley as Lasker-Jones; Patrick Godfrey as the butler Simcox; Billie Whitelaw as Maurice's mother; and Helena Bonham Carter in an uncredited cameo as an audience member at the cricket match.

=== Filming ===
The film was made on a budget of £1.58 million that included investment by Cinecom and Britain's Channel 4. Maurice proved more complicated to make than Ivory had anticipated. Its fifty-four-day shooting schedule, which involved working six-day weeks, proved long and gruelling. There was no rehearsal period, only a read-through before shooting began.

Maurice was shot on location largely in the halls and quadrangles of King's College, Cambridge including interiors in the college's chapel, where Forster was educated and later returned as a Fellow. The other interiors were primarily shot at Wilbury Park, a Palladian house in Wiltshire. Its owner, Maria St. Just, an actress and trustee of the estate of Tennessee Williams, was a friend of Merchant and Ivory. In 1979 they had been weekend guests at Wilbury Park, which made an impression on James Ivory, who, when Maurice was being prepared, chose it to serve as Pendersleigh, the country house where Maurice visits his friend Clive.

In the style of Merchant Ivory's A Room with a View, old book endpapers accompany the theme music played in minor scale at the beginning and in major scale at the end to bracket the film as a cinematographic novel.

== Differences from the novel ==
At the beginning of the film, Maurice is 11, rather than 14. The film omits almost all of the novel's philosophical dialogue and many subplots, such as Maurice's desire for the schoolboy Dickie. The scenes dealing with the subplot were filmed but not included in the final cut. The film expands the Wildean character of Lord Risley and sees him sentenced to six months of hard labour for homosexual conduct; in the novel, he is never imprisoned. In one deleted scene (first released in Cohen Media's 2002 DVD edition), Risley commits suicide. In the novel, the Durham family seat is Penge, on the border of Wiltshire and Somerset; in the film, the country house is in Pendersleigh Park. The hypnotist Lasker-Jones appears in the film rather more than in the novel; he is the person most understanding of Maurice's psychological and social situation.

== Release ==
The film had its world premiere at the Venice Film Festival on 5 September 1987, where Ivory was awarded a Silver Lion as Best Director, sharing the prize with Ermanno Olmi. James Wilby and Hugh Grant were jointly awarded Best Actor, and Richard Robbins received the prize for his music. The film received favourable reviews when it opened in New York City. Maurice received an Academy Award nomination in the Best Costume Design category.

In May 2017, a 4K restoration of Maurice was given a limited release in the United States to celebrate the film's 30th anniversary. In March 2018, the restored version was screened in London as part of the BFI Flare: London LGBT Film Festival, with introductions by James Wilby and Hugh Grant.

== Reception ==
=== Critical reception ===
Review aggregator Rotten Tomatoes reports that 81% of critics gave the film a positive review based on 36 reviews; the critics' consensus reads, "Maurice sensitively explores the ramifications of forbidden desire with a powerful love story brought to life by the outstanding efforts of a talented cast." Ken Hanke from Mountain Xpress said it was probably Merchant–Ivory's best film.

In The New York Times Janet Maslin observed "The novel's focus is predominantly on the inner life of the title character, but the film, while faithful, is broader. Moving slowly, with a fine eye for detail, it presents the forces that shape Maurice as skillfully as it brings the character to life."

Roger Ebert of the Chicago Sun-Times rated the film three stars out of a possible four, commenting:

Merchant and Ivory tell this story in a film so handsome to look at and so intelligently acted that it is worth seeing just to regard the production. Scene after scene is perfectly created: a languorous afternoon floating on the river behind the Cambridge colleges; a desultory cricket game between masters and servants; the daily routine of college life; visits to country estates and town homes; the settings of the rooms... Although some people might find Wilby unfocused in the title role, I thought he was making the right choices, portraying a man whose real thoughts were almost always elsewhere.

Claire Tomalin writing for Sight & Sound called the film "subtle, intelligent, moving and absorbing [...] extraordinary in the way it mixes fear and pleasure, horror and love, it's a stunning success for a team who seems to have mastered all the problems of making literary films".

Judy Stone in the San Francisco Chronicle wrote: "To director James Ivory's credit, however, he has recreated that period in pre-World War I England and endowed the platonic passion between two upper-class Englishmen with singular grace in Maurice." Michael Blowen in The Boston Globe commented: "The team of producer Ismail Merchant and director James Ivory has created another classy film of a classic novel with their stunning adaptation of E. M. Forster's Maurice."

Reception in the UK was different, with The Times questioning whether "so defiant a salute to homosexual passion should really be welcomed during a spiraling AIDS crisis". James Ivory has attributed the negative reviews to the reviewers being homosexual themselves, stating:

... in England, where almost every important film critic was gay, they came out against the film. Their reactions to it were extraordinary! You'd think that they would have been supportive, but they were afraid to be supportive.

=== Legacy ===
Maurice has won abundant praise in the 30 years since its initial release, both for the quality of the film and the audacity with which it depicted a gay love story at the height of the 1980s AIDS crisis. According to the Los Angeles Times, the fact that:

"the lush, dignified 'Maurice,' with its share of man-on-man smooches, full-frontal male nudity, gay lovemaking and unabashed declarations of same-sex desire, as well as a main character who was ultimately affirmative and unwavering about his homosexuality (during a time when it was a criminal offense, no less), landed a unique place in then-contemporary gay culture. That a movie which celebrated romance between men – with a rare happy ending – was released at the height of the AIDS epidemic only added to the acclaimed picture's provocative profile."

The New Yorker, in a retrospective on the film in 2017, stated, "...For many gay men coming of age in the eighties and nineties, 'Maurice' was revelatory: a first glimpse, onscreen or anywhere, of what love between men could look like". Director James Ivory said, "So many people have come up to me since 'Maurice' and pulled me aside and said, 'I just want you to know you changed my life.'"

The Guardian, describing Maurice as "undervalued in 1987 and underseen in 2017", lamented the relatively poor reception of the film compared to its lauded predecessor A Room with a View, saying it was "...filed away as, if not a disappointment, a lesser diversion" because it was "put bluntly, too gay". LA Weekly likewise called Maurice "the Merchant-Ivory film the World Missed", stating that: "it seems like it's only recently been celebrated for how groundbreaking it was, and for its importance in the development of gay cinema."

== Home media ==
In 2002, a special-edition DVD of the film was released with a new documentary and deleted scenes with director's commentary. It was released on Blu-ray in September 2017 by the Cohen Media Group.

== Awards ==
Venice Film Festival

- 1987 Won, Best Actor for James Wilby & Hugh Grant
- 1987 Won, Silver Lion (Best Director) for James Ivory
- 1987 Won, Golden Osella (Best Music) for Richard Robbins

Academy Awards

- 1988 Nominated, Best Costume Design (Jenny Beavan, John Bright)

== See also ==
- List of lesbian, gay, bisexual, or transgender-related films by storyline

== Sources ==
- Long, Robert Emmet. The Films of Merchant Ivory. Citadel Press. 1993, ISBN 0-8065-1470-1
- Long, Robert Emmet. James Ivory in Conversation. University of California Press, 2005, ISBN 0-520-23415-4.
