= Claire Rutter =

English operatic soprano

Claire Rutter (born 1972 in South Shields) is an English operatic soprano.

== Biography ==
Claire Rutter studied at the Guildhall School of Music and Drama and at the National Opera Studio, and trained with British Youth Opera. Her title role performances have included those in Norma and Tosca at Grange Park Opera, and in Lucrezia Borgia, La Traviata and Aida at English National Opera. She has also sung the role of Sieglinde in Die Walküre at Grange Park Opera. Her performances in the United States include those with Dallas Opera in 2003 (as Fiordiligi in Così fan tutte) and Santa Fe Opera in 2008 (as Alice in Falstaff). Rutter has recorded extensively for Naxos and Chandos.

== Selected discography ==
- Lennox Berkeley: A Dinner Engagement - City of London Sinfonia, Richard Hickox (conductor). Chandos CHAN 10219
- Lennox Berkeley: Ruth - City of London Sinfonia, Richard Hickox (conductor). Chandos CHAN 10301
- Gustav Holst: The Mystic Trumpeter Op.18 - Royal Scottish National Orchestra and Chorus, David Lloyd-Jones (conductor). Naxos 8.555776
- Herbert Howells: Hymnus Paradisi / Sir Patrick Spens - Bournemouth Symphony Orchestra, The Bach Choir, David Hill (conductor). Naxos 8.570352
- Carl Orff: Carmina Burana - Bournemouth Symphony Orchestra and Chorus, Marin Alsop (conductor). Naxos 8.570033
- Arthur Sullivan: The Prodigal Son / Boer War Te Deum - New London Orchestra, Ronald Corp (conductor). Hyperion CDA67423
- Arthur Sullivan: The Contrabandista / The Foresters - New London Orchestra, Ronald Corp (conductor). Hyperion CDA 67486
