= Southlands High School =

Location
- Clover Road; Chorley, Lancashire, PR7 2NJ; United Kingdom; 53.6408°N 2.6494°W

Information
- Type: Academy
- Motto: Passionate about Learning, Passionate about Achievement
- Established: 1955
- Local authority: Lancashire
- Department for Education URN: 143794 Tables
- Ofsted: Reports
- Head teacher: Paul Bousfield
- Gender: Coeducational
- Age: 11 to 16
- Enrolment: 1,008
- Colour: Navy Blue
- Website: http://www.southlands.lancs.sch.uk/

Southlands High School is a coeducational secondary school in Chorley, Lancashire, United Kingdom. It has approximately 1,000 students per annum.

== Awards ==
- Lancashire Evening Post Best In Education 2012
- Arts Mark
- Lancashire Healthy Schools (Flagship Healthy School)
