= Ruth (opera) =

Ruth is a 1956 sacred opera in English by Lennox Berkeley to a libretto by Eric Crozier after the Old Testament Book of Ruth. Premiered at the Scala Theatre, London.

== Recording ==
- Ruth, Jean Rigby (mezzo-soprano), Mark Tucker (tenor), Yvonne Kenny (soprano), Claire Rutter (soprano), Roderick Williams (baritone) Joyful Company of Singers, City of London Sinfonia, Richard Hickox Chandos
