= Pimlico Opera =

Pimlico Opera is an opera company and registered charity founded in 1987 by Wasfi Kani.

The company aims to use participation in opera to advance personal development – particularly with younger people and to engender a sense of community.

The most recent production from Pimlico Opera was Sweet Charity staged in HMP Bronzefield in November 2018. Olivier award-nominated actress Laura Pitt-Pulford played the leading role of Charity Hope Valentine.

== History ==
Though its focus today is solely in prisons and primary schools, Pimlico Opera was known for 19 years (1990-2008) as an Arts Council-funded small-scale touring company. In those years, repertoire included the Da Ponte trilogy, Cenerentola, Falstaff, Pagliacci, Turn of the Screw, Rigoletto, Gianni Schicchi and the company travelled from Berwick-upon-Tweed to Padstow in Cornwall. Pimlico Opera staged the European première of Shostakovich's musical comedy Cheryomushki at the Lyric Theatre, Hammersmith on 20 October 1994. A translation was commissioned David Pountney and composer Gerard McBurney to create a reduced orchestration. A documentary was made by the BBC "Another Bite of the Cherry".

== In prison ==
Pimlico Opera has been staging productions in prisons since 1991. In 1993, BBC Wales filmed the three-month process involved in putting on a show inside a prison. This was made into a documentary called Guys, Dolls and D-Wing that was aired on BBC2.

Prison projects since 1991:

1991: HMP Wormwood Scrubs Sweeney Todd

1992: HMP Wandsworth West Side Story

1993: HMP Wandsworth Guys & Dolls

1995: HMP Wandsworth West Side Story

1996: Mountjoy Prison Dublin West Side Story

1997: HMP Bullingdon, Oxfordshire West Side Story

1999: HMP Downview Threepenny Opera.

2001: HMP Winchester Threepenny Opera

2002: HMP Winchester West Side Story

2003: HMP Wormwood Scrubs Guys & Dolls

2004 HMP Ashwell, Leicestershire Assassins

2005: HMP Coldingley, Surrey Assassins

2006: HMP Bronzefield Middlesex Chicago

2007: HMP Wandsworth Les Miserables

2008: HMP Kingston Sweeney Todd (Project cancelled)

2009: HMP Wandsworth West Side Story

2010: HMP Wandsworth Carmen - The Musical

2011: HMP Send, Surrey Sugar

2012: HMP Erlestoke, Wiltshire Les Miserables

2013: HMP Erlestoke, Wiltshire West Side Story

2014: HMP Bronzefield Sister Act

2015: HMP ISIS Our House

2017: HMP High Down Les Miserables

2018: HMP Bronzefield Sweet Charity

== In primary schools ==
Every week of the school year, Pimlico Opera gives 2,000 primary children a half hour singing class. Schools are selected in which there is little or no music provision, with KS2 results below the national average and a high percentage of free school meals.

The project takes place in Hampshire, Surrey, Durham, Newcastle, and Nottingham.
