= Baron St Just =

Extinct barony in the Peerage of the United Kingdom

Baron St Just, of St Just in Penwith, County of Cornwall, was a title in the Peerage of the United Kingdom. It was created in 1935 for the banker Edward Grenfell. He was the son of Henry Grenfell, the grandson of Charles Grenfell, the great-grandson of Pascoe Grenfell and the first cousin of William Grenfell, 1st Baron Desborough. The title became extinct upon the death of his son, the second Baron, in 1984.

== Barons St Just (1935) ==
- Edward Charles Grenfell, 1st Baron St Just (1870–1941)
- Peter George Grenfell, 2nd Baron St Just (1922–1984)

== See also ==
- Baron Desborough
- Baron Grenfell
