= This Is (An Entertainment) =

This Is (An Entertainment) is a play by Tennessee Williams. Similar in plot to that of Idiot's Delight by Robert E. Sherwood, it focuses on a hedonistic countess, the wife of a wealthy manufacturer of ammunition, who arrives at an elegant resort hotel in the midst of a war-torn Central European country in search of sexual misadventures. She achieves her goal with the help of a handsome blond chauffeur and his look-alike, a leader of the revolution.

Williams described the play as a first draft in need of polishing when the American Conservatory Theater staged it at the Geary Theater in San Francisco in 1976. The cast included Elizabeth Huddle as the countess, Nicholas Cortland in the dual roles of the chauffeur and revolutionary, and Ray Reinhardt as the count.

The character of the Countess was based on Maria Britneva; the title originally included the phrase "For Maria Britneva".

Stanley Eichelbaum of the San Francisco Examiner called it "a boisterous vaudeville-like farce done in the free-wheeling style of the playwright's earlier Camino Real. Though it is shot through with crude and raunchy humor, it evokes an old-world decadence, like the comic fantasies of Jean Anouilh." He added, "This Is is anything but a subtle play. Williams has subverted his lyrical gift with cheap and dreary vulgar humor, with painfully witless jokes ... More surprising, perhaps, is the one-dimensional flatness of the characters."
