= Sara Fulgoni =

British mezzo-soprano

Sara Fulgoni is a British mezzo-soprano.

She graduated from the Royal Northern College of Music where she studied under Barbara Robotham. She made her Royal Opera House debut in Verdi's Luisa Miller debut in 2003 and has sung at the Salzburg Festival, La Scala and other important houses. She sang the title role at the world premiere of Thérèse Raquin by Tobias Picker for Dallas Opera. Her repertoire also includes Il ritorno d'Ulisse in patria, Dido and Aeneas, Marguerite in La Damnation de Faust, Juno in Semele and many others. Her signature role is perhaps Carmen – the Daily Telegraph referred to her as "the Carmen of the Decade" – a role which she has sung for the English National Opera, Welsh National Opera, Geneva Opera, Santa Fe Opera, Toulouse Capitole, and at the Beijing Music Festival.

In addition to her operatic roles, Fulgoni has also participated in several concerts and recitals.

== Recordings ==
She has recorded the Mahler Symphony No. 8, Urlicht in Des Knabenwunderhorn and Elijah for Decca, Oberto for Philips, Suor Angelica and the Cherubini Mass in D Minor for EMI.
