= Zweli Mkhize =

South African doctor and politician (born 1956)

The Honourable Zweli Mkhize MP
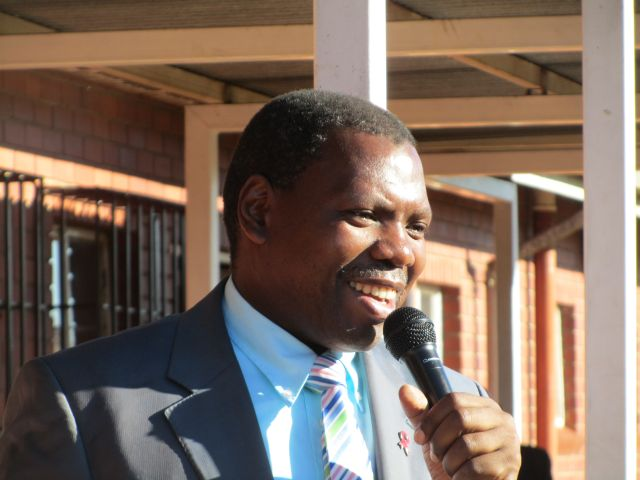

25th Minister of Health of South Africa
- In office 30 May 2019 – 5 August 2021
- President: Cyril Ramaphosa
- Deputy: Joe Phaahla
- Preceded by: Aaron Motsoaledi
- Succeeded by: Joe Phaahla

Minister of Cooperative Governance and Traditional Affairs
- In office 27 February 2018 – 29 May 2019
- President: Cyril Ramaphosa
- Preceded by: Des van Rooyen
- Succeeded by: Nkosazana Dlamini-Zuma

Treasurer General of the African National Congress
- In office 18 December 2012 – 18 December 2017
- Preceded by: Mathews Phosa
- Succeeded by: Paul Mashatile

5th Premier of KwaZulu-Natal
- In office 6 May 2009 – 1 September 2013
- Monarch: Goodwill Zwelithini
- Preceded by: S'bu Ndebele
- Succeeded by: Senzo Mchunu

Chancellor of the University of KwaZulu-Natal
- In office 18 May 2009 – August 2017
- Preceded by: Frene Ginwala
- Succeeded by: Mogoeng Mogoeng

Personal details
- Born: Zwelini Lawrence Mkhize; 2 February 1956 (age 70) Willowfontein, Pietermaritzburg, Natal; Union of South Africa
- Party: African National Congress
- Spouse: May Mashego
- Children: Naledi; Nokulinda; Dedani
- Education: University of Natal (MBChB)
- Occupation: Doctor; politician; anti-apartheid activist

Zwelini Lawrence Mkhize (born 2 February 1956) is a South African medical doctor and politician who served as the Minister of Health from May 2019 until his resignation on 5 August 2021. He previously served as the Minister of Cooperative Governance and Traditional Affairs from 2018 to 2019. Before that, he was the fifth Premier of KwaZulu-Natal from 2009 to 2013. He was also the Chancellor of the University of KwaZulu-Natal from 2009 to 2017.

A former anti-apartheid activist in Umkhonto we Sizwe, Mkhize was formerly a provincial politician in his home province of KwaZulu-Natal, with particular influence in the KwaZulu-Natal midlands. He was a Member of the Executive Council in the provincial government between 1994 and 2004 and was elected provincial chairperson of the African National Congress (ANC) in 2008. He rose to national prominence in 2012 when he was elected national Treasurer-General of the ANC at the party's 53rd National Conference. He also campaigned unsuccessfully for the ANC presidency ahead of the 55th National Conference in 2022.

As Minister of Health under President Cyril Ramaphosa, Mkhize played a central role in South Africa's response to the COVID-19 pandemic. However, he resigned in 2021 amid allegations that he and his family had benefitted improperly from a state contract awarded by the Department of Health to a communications company called Digital Vibes. Special Investigation Unit (SIU) says Mkhize family benefited from R11.5 million rands of digital vibes funds that bought themselves a farm and cattle.

== Early life and career ==
Zweli Lawrence Mkhize was born on 2 February 1956 in Willowfontein on the outskirts of Pietermaritzburg in what is now KwaZulu-Natal province. He was the fifth of seven children. He belongs to the Zulu Mkhize clan, formerly of the Nkandla region, but, by the time of the advent of apartheid in 1948, his family was bound to farm labour by a labour tenancy agreement. His father later worked for the parks department of the Pietermaritzburg Corporation while his elder brothers worked as farm hands, but Mkhize continued his formal education. He attended secondary school at Dlangezwa High School, a boarding school in Zululand, where he was a strong student. He later said that the anti-apartheid protests of a local "eccentric", David Cecil Oxford Matiwane, sparked his interest in politics.

In 1976, the year of the Soweto uprising, Mkhize began medical school at the University of Natal, where he was a member of the students' representative council. He graduated with an MBChB in 1982, completed his internship at McCord Hospital in Durban in 1983, and began work at Edendale Hospital in Pietermaritzburg in 1984.

== Anti-apartheid activism ==
By the mid-1980s, Mkhize was a member of Umkhonto weSizwe (MK), the underground armed wing of the anti-apartheid African National Congress (ANC), and was connected to other ANC figures in the KwaZulu-Natal midlands, including Harry Gwala. He went into exile in Swaziland in 1986. According to the Daily Maverick, his departure from South Africa was related to police attention to Operation Butterfly, the codename for an MK plan to bomb important infrastructure in KwaZulu-Natal; eleven other people involved in the plan had been arrested in late 1985, during a government state of emergency. In exile in Swaziland and then in Zimbabwe, Mkhize continued to practice medicine; he often treated wounded MK combatants. He also continued his work with MK and by 1987 he was a commander in charge of underground cells which operated in KwaZulu-Natal.

He returned to South Africa in 1991 after the ANC had been unbanned by the South African government. He initially worked at Themba Hospital in what was then the Eastern Transvaal, but opened a private medical practice in Pietermaritzburg in late 1991. He, along with his MK colleague Jacob Zuma, became an ANC peace broker in the ongoing political violence in KwaZulu-Natal: ANC-aligned groups and Inkatha-aligned groups fought each other in the region throughout the negotiations to end apartheid. From 1991 to 1994, he was also a member of the ANC National Heath Secretariat, which was tasked with formulating health policy for a post-apartheid South Africa.

== Post-apartheid political career ==
=== Provincial government ===
==== Executive Council ====
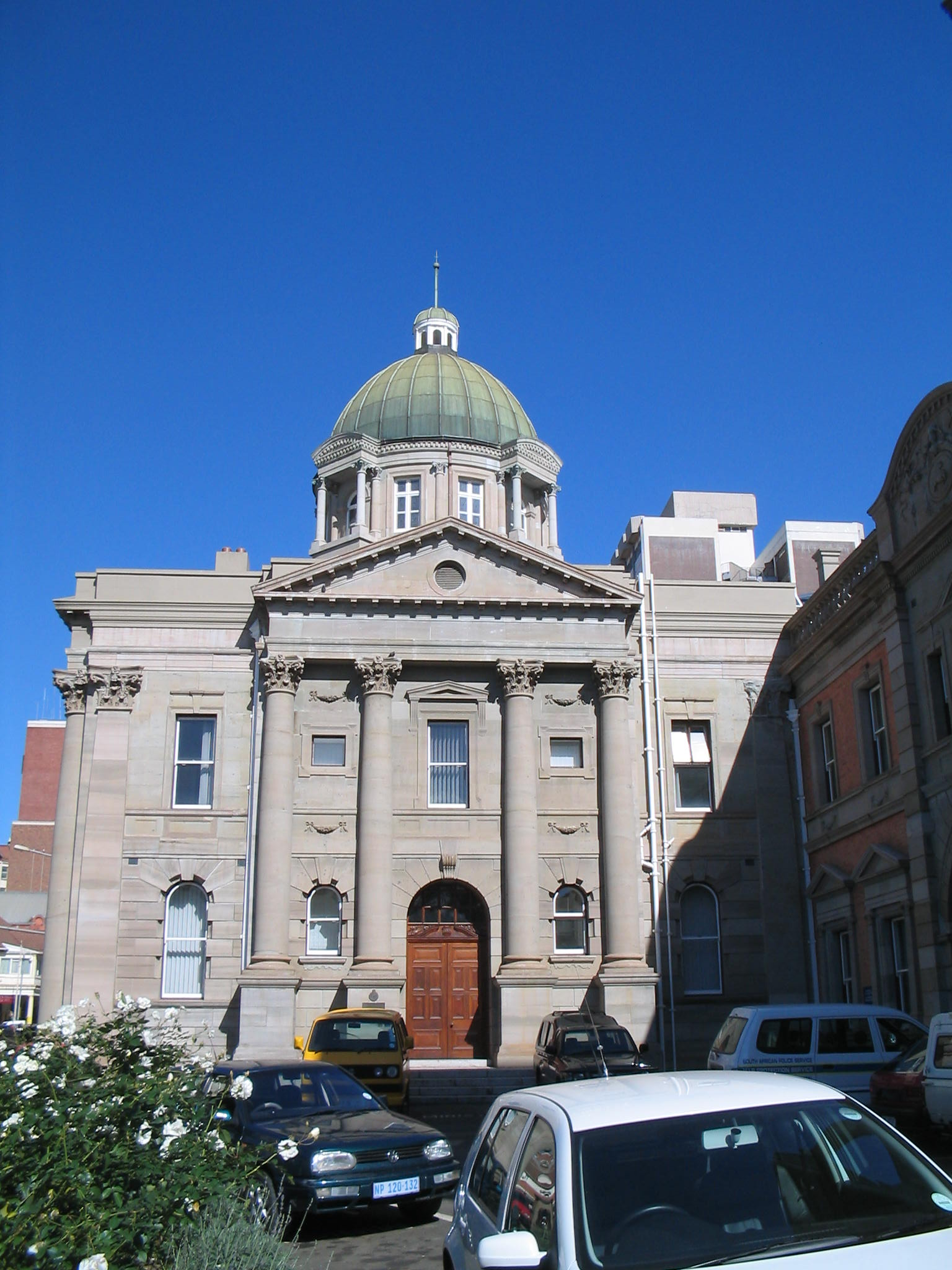
The building of the KwaZulu-Natal legislature in Pietermaritzburg

After South Africa's first democratic elections in 1994, Mkhize was appointed Member of the Executive Council (MEC) for Health in the provincial government of KwaZulu-Natal, one of two provinces where the ANC did not win a majority in 1994. He held the post for a decade, becoming the longest-serving health MEC in the country. His tenure coincided with the peak of the HIV/AIDS epidemic in South Africa, which was particularly severe in KwaZulu-Natal. Under President Thabo Mbeki, the government response to the epidemic was criticised as unscientific and influenced by HIV/AIDS denialism; in the summation of Bhekisisa Centre for Health Journalism, Mkhize was at times "both hero and villain" in this context. Mkhize deviated from national government policy in allowing the Centre for the Aids Programme of Research to conduct antiretroviral treatment trials in public clinics in KwaZulu-Natal. However, in 2001, when the Treatment Action Campaign sued the government for its failure to provide services to prevent mother-to-child transmission of HIV, Mkhize backed Mbeki in opposing the lawsuit. This was attributed to Mkhize's apparent unwillingness to "break ranks" with Mbeki publicly. Later, in 2016, Mkhize wrote a lengthy open letter to Mbeki about his HIV/AIDS policy, describing himself as having been "caught in the middle" of the 2001 legal battle. He said that, at the time, he had disagreed with Mbeki's opposition to antiretrovirals and had lobbied for the government to fast-track nevirapine trials.

In November 2004, Mkhize was appointed MEC for Finance and Economic Development, also in KwaZulu-Natal. Under his leadership, the provincial department implemented austerity measures, which were considered successful. He was also appointed Leader of Government Business in KwaZulu-Natal in 2004 and held both positions simultaneously until 2009. In addition, from 2006, he chaired the political oversight committee for the 2010 Soccer World Cup.

==== Rise in the ANC ====
While an MEC, Mkhize reportedly formed a close political alliance with Jacob Zuma, who became national Deputy President. He was elected to the ANC National Executive Committee, the party's top executive organ, at the ANC's 50th National Conference in December 1997, and he was re-elected to the ANC National Executive Committee in 2002 and in 2007. He was considered "one of the main architects" of Zuma's rise to the ANC presidency over that period, having helped engineer an influx of pro-ANC members to the ANC in KwaZulu-Natal. He also served as chairperson of the ANC National Executive Committee's subcommittee on education and health and was a member of the ANC task team on national health insurance.

However, his most prominent role in the ANC was at the provincial level in KwaZulu-Natal. Having served as the ANC provincial Treasurer-General, he was elected ANC deputy provincial Chairperson by 1999. Before and during his term as finance MEC, he was at the centre of a political battle with S'bu Ndebele, then the Premier of KwaZulu-Natal and the provincial Chairperson of the ANC. At the ANC's provincial elective conference in June 2008, Mkhize prevailed and was elected ANC provincial chairperson.

==== Premiership ====
In his capacity as provincial chairperson, Mkhize became the ANC's candidate to replace Ndebele as KwaZulu-Natal Premier in the 2009 general election. The ANC won control of the KwaZulu-Natal legislature in the 2009 election and Mkhize was indirectly elected Premier, beating John Steenhuisen of the opposition Democratic Alliance by 68 votes to seven. In the same month, May 2009, he was appointed Chancellor of his alma mater, which had been relaunched as the University of KwaZulu-Natal; he ultimately served in that post until 2017.

In May 2010, five men were arrested in Hillcrest, KwaZulu-Natal, on the basis of a criminal intelligence tip-off, while allegedly on their way to Mkhize's home in Pietermaritzburg; illegal firearms and ammunition were found in their vehicle. They appeared in court in Durban on weapons charges and the charge of conspiracy to commit murder; the alleged target of the conspiracy was later identified as Mkhize. In addition, one of the men, Sizwe Mkhize (of no relation), had in his possession a document which appeared to implicate provincial leaders of the Tripartite Alliance – the ANC and its partners the South African Communist Party and the Congress of South African Trade Unions – in a plot to overthrow Mkhize. The Hawks investigated the case, and the KwaZulu-Natal structures of the Tripartite Alliance conducted their own investigation through a joint task team, on which the ANC was represented by Willies Mchunu; the findings of the task team were kept confidential. The court case against the men was struck off the court roll in November when the state failed to send a prosecutor to trial. Mkhize had also encountered Sizwe Mkhize in 2007, when he claimed that he and another hitman had been hired by Mkhize's provincial rivals to assassinate him.

In May 2012, the KwaZulu-Natal ANC unanimously re-elected him as ANC provincial chairperson. His re-election followed a minor political scandal concerning a leaked intelligence report compiled by Richard Mdluli; the report said that Mkhize, along with other ANC leaders, were plotting to depose Zuma as ANC President. Although Mkhize said there had not been any such plot, the Mail & Guardian said that the report had damaged Mkhize's relationship with Zuma, as well as his popularity in KwaZulu-Natal.

=== ANC Treasurer-General ===
Mkhize was elected national Treasurer-General of ANC at the party's 53rd National Conference in December 2012. In the election, he beat Paul Mashatile with 2,988 votes to Mashatile's 961. Mkhize ran on an informal slate aligned to incumbent national President Zuma, who was re-elected ANC President at the conference. He was also rumoured to have been involved in recruiting businessman Cyril Ramaphosa to run for the deputy presidency on that slate. Sources told the Mail & Guardian that other leaders in KwaZulu-Natal had pushed for Mkhize to advance to a national position not because they supported him but because they sought to have him leave provincial politics; Mkhize and his colleagues denied the claim.

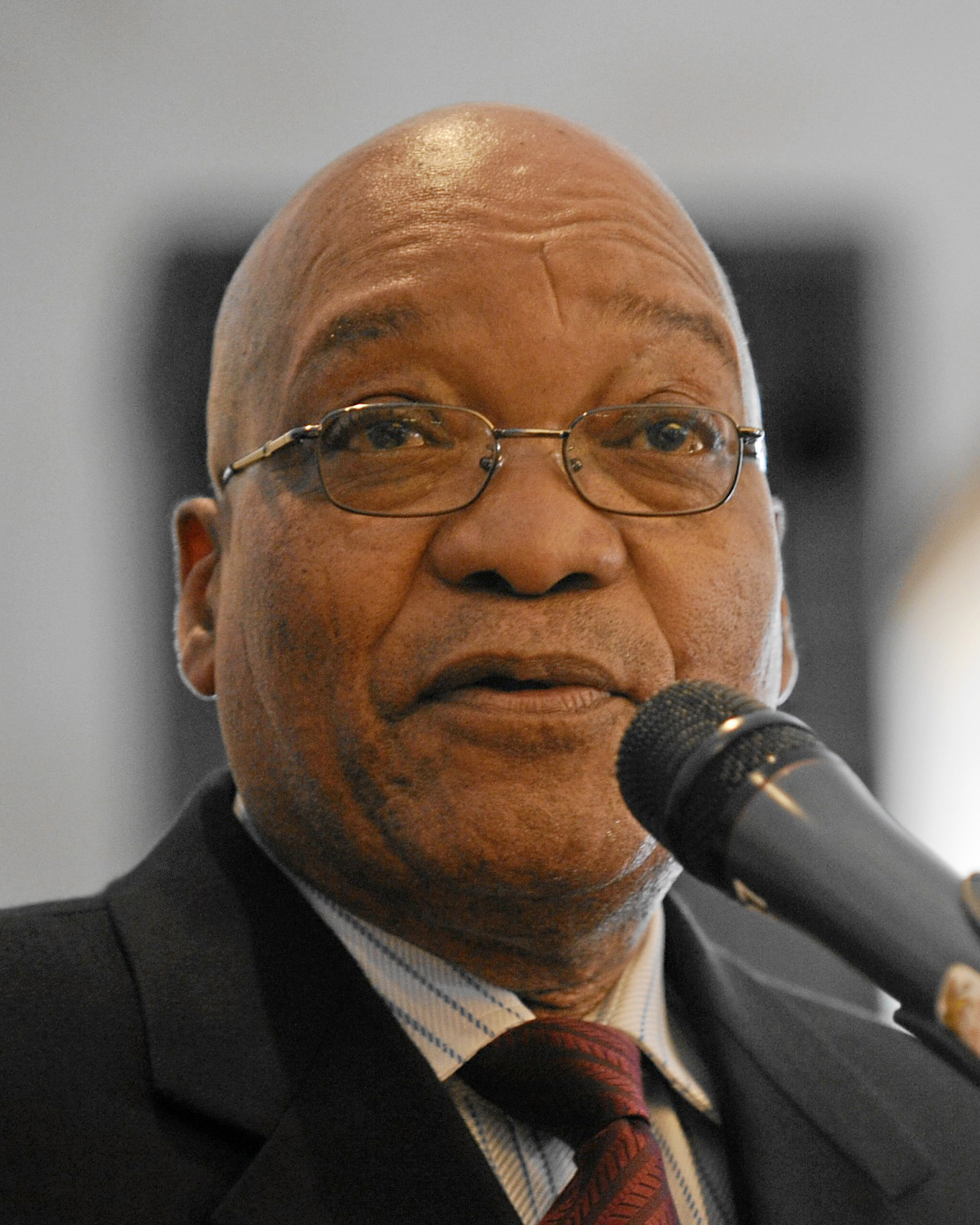
Mkhize was a key political ally of Jacob Zuma during the landmark Polokwane conference, but their later relationship was more ambivalent.

Although Mkhize's constitutional term as KwaZulu-Natal Premier would not end until the 2014 general election, he resigned from the office in August 2013 to attend full-time to his duties as ANC Treasurer-General, a job based out of the ANC's headquarters at Luthuli House in Johannesburg. Mkhize's tenure coincided with several scandals which appeared to implicate Zuma's administration in state capture. Notably, despite his longstanding alliance with Zuma, in December 2015 he was critical of Zuma's decision to dismiss Nhlanhla Nene as Minister of Finance and reportedly was part of a group of ANC leaders which met with Zuma to persuade him to reconsider. In April 2017, he joined other ANC leaders in publicly criticising Zuma's subsequent decision to reshuffle his cabinet again and dismiss Pravin Gordhan as Minister of Finance. Between those two interventions, in November 2016, the Sunday Times reported that the Hawks were investigating Mkhize, Gwede Mantashe, and Mcebisi Jonas in connection with Jonas's claim that the Gupta family had offered him a bribe and a cabinet post; the investigation reportedly concerned the failure of Mkhize, Mantashe, and Jonas to report the bribe earlier. However, the Hawks said that there was no such investigation.

=== 2017 presidential bid ===
Ahead of the end of his term as Treasurer-General in 2017, Mkhize campaigned to succeed Zuma as ANC President, with a social media campaign under the slogan #AbantuBathi (Zulu for, literally, "people say"). He first announced that he would be willing to accept nominations to the position in early September 2017. Mkhize had reputedly been an active participant in "provincial patronage politics", and he admitted to his own role in mobilising support for the Zuma-aligned faction in 2007, but, during the campaign, he argued publicly that maintaining the unity of the ANC required eschewing factionalism and slate-based campaigning.

Although the frontrunners in the presidential race were clearly Ramaphosa and Nkosazana Dlamini-Zuma, Mkhize was viewed as a possible "compromise choice", an alternative who might be viewed as acceptable by the respective supporters of each frontrunner. The Business Day reported that Mkhize's candidacy might be endorsed by David Mabuza, an influential ANC powerbroker in Mpumalanga who was pushing for a "unity ticket" to replace Zuma. It was also reported that Ramaphosa had considered Mkhize as a possible running mate but had decided to select a woman (Lindiwe Sisulu) instead. Mkhize's presidential campaign earned some support at the level of local and regional branches, especially in the Eastern Cape and his home province KwaZulu-Natal, but he ultimately failed to earn the nomination of any of the organisation's nine provinces, and he abandoned his presidential bid. Instead, he took up the nominations he had received – from 193 local branches and one province – to stand for the ANC deputy presidency.

However, when the ANC's 54th National Conference began in December 2017, Mkhize unexpectedly announced that he had decided "after much consideration" to withdraw from the deputy presidential race and therefore would not be in the running for election to any of the ANC's so-called "Top Six" leadership positions. Sources told the Mail & Guardian and the Sunday Times that Mkhize had withdrawn following discussions with Mabuza, on the basis that Mkhize would not oppose Mabuza's candidacy for Deputy President if Mkhize received backing – from Mabuza's and Dlamini-Zuma's supporters – for a senior cabinet position, possibly the Ministry of Finance, and for the top-ranked position on the incoming National Executive Committee. Mabuza was ultimately elected ANC Deputy President and Mkhize was indeed re-elected to the National Executive Committee with the most votes of any candidate, 2,550 across a total of 4,283 ballots. Mkhize denied that he had engaged in deal-making or horse-trading, saying that he had withdrawn in order to build unity in and strengthen the ANC. He was replaced as ANC Treasurer-General by Paul Mashatile, who had run against him unsuccessfully in 2012.

=== National government ===
In late February 2018, Zuma resigned from the national Presidency; Ramaphosa succeeded him and appointed Mkhize to his cabinet as Minister of Cooperative Governance and Traditional Affairs. Mkhize was sworn into the National Assembly to take up the position. In late May 2019, after Ramaphosa had been elected to a full term following the 2019 general election, Mkhize was made Minister of Health in the new cabinet. He remained in that position until August 2021. His initial priority in the portfolio was the finalisation of a proposal to establish a new system of national health insurance: he promised to release the draft National Health Insurance Bill within his first 100 days in office, and he did so, following consultations with civil society that led to the June 2019 Presidential Health Summit Compact.

==== COVID-19 pandemic ====
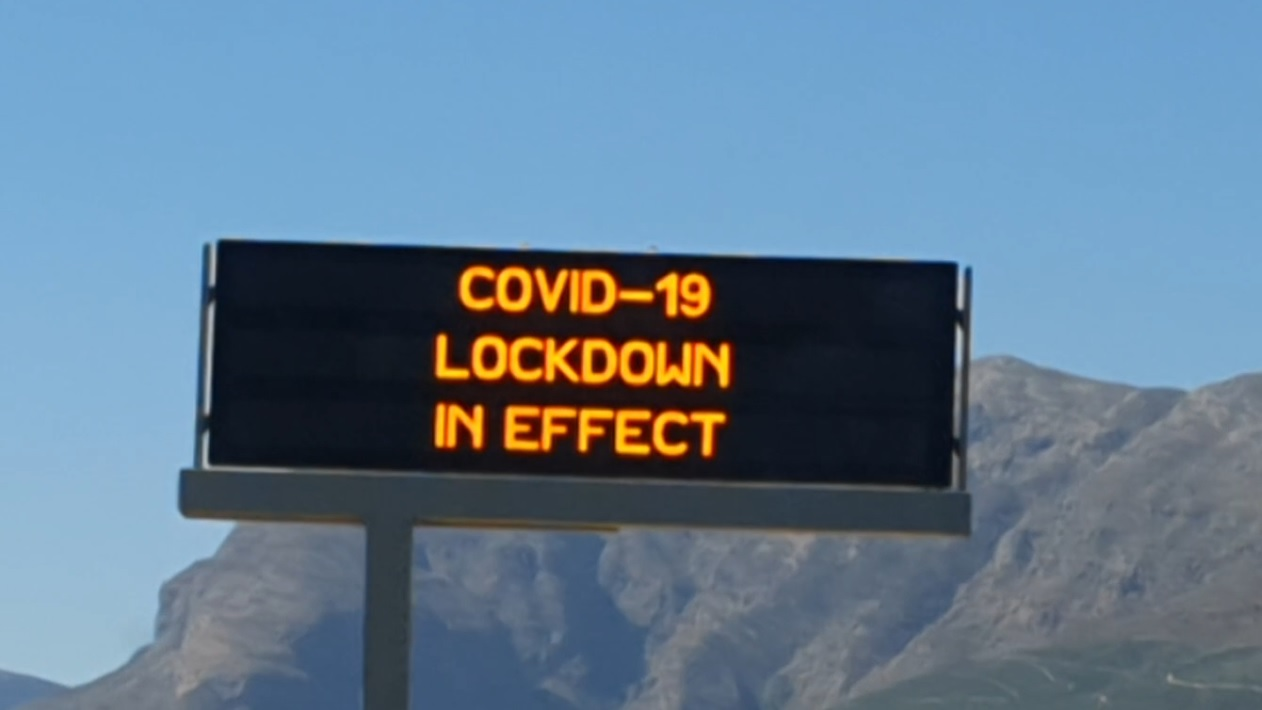
A road sign in the Western Cape reminds drivers of the strict COVID-19 lockdown instituted under Mkhize.

After the first case of COVID-19 in South Africa was detected in March 2020, Mkhize's central task became leadership of the country's response to the COVID-19 pandemic. Evaluations of his performance during the pandemic were mixed but generally positive; in his emphasis on interventions supported by scientific evidence, he was compared favourably to Manto Tshabalala-Msimang, who had led the South African government's response to the HIV/AIDS epidemic. In April 2020, John Steenhuisen, who by then was leader of the opposition, said he was impressed with Mkhize's leadership and would not have done anything differently. The same week, the BBC described South Africa's early response as "ruthlessly efficient", praising Mkhize's "no-nonsense, energetic performance, and his sober, deeply knowledgeable daily briefings". The Financial Mail named him "newsmaker of the year" in December 2020.

==== Digital Vibes scandal ====
In the first half of 2021, beginning with an exposé on 23 February, the Daily Maverick published a series of reports by investigative journalist Pieter-Louis Myburgh on what became known as the Digital Vibes scandal. The reports concerned state contracts between the Department of Health and a communications company called Digital Vibes. The company had received R150 million from the department between January 2020 and February 2021 for work on campaigns for the national health insurance roll-out and COVID-19 response. It had also received a communications contract from the Department of Cooperative Governance and Traditional Affairs in August 2018, several months after Mkhize took up that portfolio. Some of the charges on the Digital Vibes invoice – including for Mkhize's media appearances – appeared to have been inflated. More controversially, the company was linked to two of Mkhize's associates: Tahera Mather, Mkhize's long-serving personal spokesperson, and Naadhira Mitha, a former assistant private secretary in Mkhize's ministerial office. Both had also worked as communications consultants on Mkhize's 2017 campaign for the ANC presidency. Mather and Mitha had benefited from the contracts through consultancy work for Digital Vibes, and the Daily Maverick later uncovered evidence which it said showed that Mather and Mitha "effectively controlled" Digital Vibes, even though they were not officially listed as directors of the company. About R90 million of the R150 million received by Digital Vibes had been channelled to other accounts – either to entities set up by Mather and Mitha or to third parties, including businesses and personal accounts held by Mather's immediate family.

Following the publication of the Daily Maverick's early reporting, the Department of Health suspended the Digital Vibes contract in early March 2021. The government announced that the contract would be investigated, both by the Special Investigating Unit (SIU) and by an external forensic investigator appointed by the department. In late May, Mkhize said that the external investigation had found that the tender and bidding process for the contract had been irregular and in contravention in the Public Finance Management Act; however, he maintained continuously that he had not participated in awarding the contract, that he had not benefitted personally from it, and that Mather and Mitha were not his personal friends. Later that week, the Daily Maverick published further reports purporting to show Mkhize's personal connection to Digital Vibes: according to the newspaper, the company had paid for maintenance work at a property owned by Mkhize's family trust, had transferred at least R300,000 to a company owned by Mkhize's son, and had bought his son a second-hand Toyota Land Cruiser. On 9 June, President Ramaphosa put Mkhize on special leave (effectively suspension) to allow him "to attend to allegations and investigations" concerning the Digital Vibes contracts.

The report of the SIU's investigation was completed in June 2021. The SIU concurred that the contract had been improperly awarded and recommended that the entire contract should be set aside and that those involved should be required to repay the state with interest. It also found that Mkhize's conduct had been "improper and, at worst... unlawful": there was evidence that he had put pressure on department officials to approve the Digital Vibes contract and that he had "directly and indirectly received gratifications from Digital Vibes", including through his son. In addition to Myburgh's revelations, the SIU had found that Mkhize's son had received cash payments from the director of Digital Vibes; it sought to have him repay about R3.8 million in total. Writing on Twitter, Mkhize's son, Dedani, admitted that he had received money from Mather, but denied that he had ever received more than R300,000.

==== Resignation ====
Although he continued to maintain his innocence, Mkhize resigned as Minister of Health on 5 August 2021, hours before Ramaphosa was expected to announce a cabinet reshuffle. He later claimed that Ramaphosa's associates had influenced the investigation in an attempt to "clip my wings". As of May 2022, he was seeking judicial review of the SIU's report, which was made public in September 2021. At that time, the SIU continued its attempts to recover the amount of the contract through civil litigation. However, in April 2022, Parliament's Joint Standing Committee on Ethics and Members' Interests cleared Mkhize of any wrongful conflict of interest in the scandal. In September 2025, the SIU presented new evidence which was admitted in R150 Million Digital Vibes Scandal involving Zweli Mkhize.

=== 2022 presidential bid ===
In May 2022, ahead of the ANC's 55th National Conference in December, Mkhize announced he would seek the ANC Presidency for a second time. He said that, if elected, he would prioritise the party and government's response to political corruption, including by implementing the recommendations of the Zondo Commission. He also identified South Africa's rolling blackouts as a priority issue; he said in that regard that "coal must and will remain the country’s main source of electricity and other sources like wind, sun and water and other renewable energy sources will only play a secondary role". The provincial executive of the ANC in KwaZulu-Natal endorsed his candidacy. However, there were consistent rumours that the Hawks were planning to institute formal criminal charges against Mkhize in connection with the Digital Vibes scandal; if they did so, the ANC's step-aside rule would preclude him from standing in any internal party elections.

== Other controversies ==
=== Alleged links to political violence ===
As noted by the Daily Maverick, Mkhize is sometimes mentioned as a participant in the political violence, and even political assassinations, that continued in KwaZulu-Natal after the end of apartheid, but these allegations have never been proven or prosecuted: "the stench of assassinations would end up clinging to Zweli Mkhize, even if the accusations didn’t stick". Most recently, in September 2018, Mkhize's home in Willowfontein was reportedly raided by a task team responsible for investigating political killings in KwaZulu-Natal – although Mkhize's spokesman disputed that it was a raid, describing it instead as an interview between the police and Mkhize's private security guards. According to the Witness, the investigation concerned the role of private security companies in political assassinations, and the raid involved the arrest of one of Mkhize's guards and the confiscation of various illegal firearms.

==== Gunrunning investigation ====
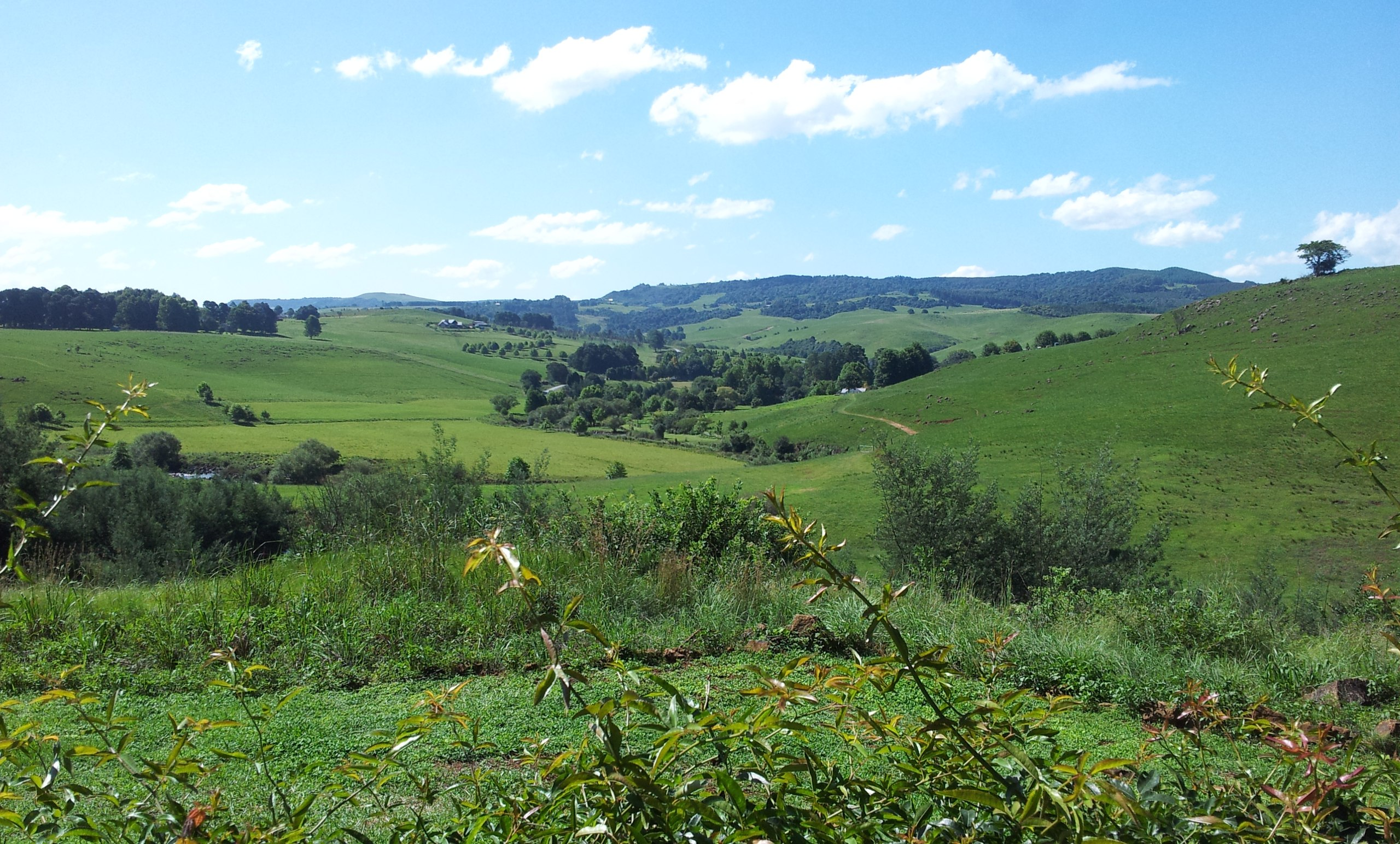
The KwaZulu-Natal midlands became known as a hub of political violence from the 1980s.

Ahead of the 1999 general election, Inkatha, by then rebranded as Inkatha Freedom Party (IFP), claimed publicly that Mkhize used underhanded methods to promote ANC recruitment in the KwaZulu-Natal midlands, even going so far as to promise IFP defectors weapons or amnesty from prosecution. Early in 1999, David Ntombela, an IFP leader in the KwaZulu-Natal midlands, accused Mkhize of a conspiracy to murder him. A local activist had reportedly signed an affidavit saying that Mkhize had given him a submachine gun and told him to use it to kill Ntombela and then claim the murder had been in self-defence. However, the activist in question later retracted this claim, saying that Ntombela and the police had intimidated him into making a false statement. Shortly after Ntombela lodged his accusation, the Network of Independent Monitors published a report which claimed that Ntombela and another opposition leader in the province, Sifiso Nkabinde, had been informants for the apartheid security police; opposition politicians claimed that the report was an attempt by the ANC's "propaganda machine" to distract attention from the allegations against Mkhize.

In April 1999, the Sunday Tribune reported that the SIU intended to charge Mkhize and several other provincial politicians, including the IFP's Philip Powell, on grounds related to political violence. Moketedi Mpshe of the National Prosecuting Authority (NPA) denied that charges were imminent, but confirmed that Mkhize was under investigation on suspicion of gunrunning and conspiracy to kill Ntombela. The ANC said that it would cooperate with any fair investigation, but warned that the investigation should not be privy to third force influence, nor should the authorities charge ANC politicians merely in order to "balance" the charges against criminals of other political parties. The incumbent Premier of KwaZulu-Natal, Lionel Mtshali of the IFP, responded with a proposal to establish a commission of inquiry to investigate the allegations against Mkhize, but failed to do so after Mkhize successfully applied to the high court to interdict the move.

In November 2003, Mkhize said that he had laid a complaint with the Public Protector in connection with the April 1999 Sunday Tribune report. He implied that Bulelani Ngcuka, the National Director of Public Prosecutions, had leaked word of the investigation to the media in order to tarnish Mkhize's reputation. At that time, the NPA said that the 1999 investigation had been initiated by the South African Police Service and had been referred to the NPA, but that Mpshe, then the Director of Public Prosecutions in KwaZulu-Natal, had declined to prosecute Mkhize because of a lack of evidence.

==== Sifiso Nkabinde ====
In January 1999, Sifiso Nkabinde, a United Democratic Movement (UDM) activist in KwaZulu-Natal, was shot dead in Richmond, KwaZulu-Natal by anonymous gunmen who apparently carried weapons stolen from the Pietermaritzburg police station. Later that week, apparently in retaliation, Mkhize was ambushed by gunmen while travelling in an ANC convoy with Bheki Cele. In subsequent years, several men – many of them affiliated to the local ANC – were charged and convicted of murdering Nkabinde. In one of those trials, in 2000, Mkhize was implicated in the assassination by one of the accused, Sibusiso Bruce Mhlongo, who was formerly Mkhize's bodyguard. Mhlongo said that Mkhize had been involved in planning the murder and had offered a R200,000 reward for its execution. However, under cross-examination, he admitted that his testimony was hearsay, because he had not directly spoken with Mkhize but had only heard of his involvement from his associates.

Mkhize was asked to testify in court in March 2001, but outlined his account in an affidavit instead. He denied any involvement in the murder and said he had not conspired to kill Nkabinde or offered a reward to his killers. Indeed, he said that young ANC members often approached him to request weapons with which to target Nkabinde and other opposition politicians, in retaliation for earlier attacks on the ANC, but that he refused these requests. He said that he had only been approached about Nkabinde's killing after it had occurred, when the perpetrators had approached him asking for payment.

In 2008, Mkhize successfully sued Media24 for defamation after one of its titles, City Press, reported in a 2007 article that Mhlongo had "told the court that Mkhize had promised him thousands of rands in exchange for Nkabinde's assassination". Mkhize said, and the high court agreed, that this was misleading, since Mhlongo's claim had been hearsay. City Press paid Mkhize R150,000 in damages and published an apology.

==== Babita Deokaran ====
In 2021, Mkhize was implicated in the high-profile murder of Babita Deokaran by one of the suspects charged with committing the killing. Deokaran had been an employee of the Gauteng provincial health department and at the time of her death had been a whistleblower and key witness in an ongoing SIU investigation into PPE corruption during the COVID-19 pandemic; she was assassinated outside her home in southern Johannesburg in August 2021. Phakamani Hadebe and five other men were charged with the murder and while in police custody Hadebe confessed to having killed Deokaran in exchange for a R400,000 payment from Mkhize and his younger brother. During his bail hearing in November 2021, Hadebe said that he had in fact never met Mkhize and that he had made the confession under extreme duress and wished to retract it. In a statement, Mkhize said that he had "absolutely nothing to do with [the murder], nor the alleged procurement irregularities which are believed to have driven it". Later that week, the prosecutor in the case indicated that Mkhize might be a suspect or witness in the case, but the authorities had not reported any further investigation into his alleged role as of April 2022.

=== Contact with Khwezi ===
In 2017, journalist Redi Tlhabi claimed in her book, Khwezi, that Mkhize had attempted to convince Fezekile Kuzwayo (best known as Khwezi) to drop rape charges against Zuma in 2005. Mkhize, like Zuma, had known Khwezi and her family in exile. At least two former ANC politicians corroborated Tlhabi's claim: Vytjie Mentor said that Mkhize had been Zuma's "pointsman [sic]" during the trial, and Mbhazima Shilowa said that "Mkhize's role in the Khwezi matter is well documented". In a statement, Mkhize provided a detailed account of the saga from his perspective, denying that he had exploited Khwezi's trust in him.

=== Loans to wife ===
In 2006, Mkhize's wife was granted an R11.8 million loan by the state-owned Ithala Development Finance Corporation, which at the time was under the political custodianship of Mkhize as finance MEC. She used the loan to buy a farm near Pietermaritzburg. Mkhize denied allegations that he had improperly influenced the decision to grant the loan, saying that his wife was a "professional and a businesswoman in her own right who has dealings with other financial institutions".

In 2018, Noseweek reported that, in 2008, the KwaZulu-Natal Treasury had signed a R10.9 million property lease with businessman Protus Sokhela in the same period that Sokhela extended two interest-free loans, worth R2 million total, to a company whose sole owner was Mkhize's wife. Mkhize was finance MEC at the time the deal was signed, which Noseweek suggested implied a conflict of interest. Mkhize denied any wrongdoing.

Sokhela was later implicated in the Digital Vibes scandal, and the Daily Maverick claimed that some of the state funds paid to Digital Vibes had been used to make payments on Mkhize's wife's Ithala loan.

=== Chartered aircraft ===
In November 2013, there was a minor scandal, stoked by the opposition Democratic Alliance, when it emerged that Mkhize had chartered 45 planes and helicopters between 2010 and 2013, at a cost of R1.2 million in state funds. On five of those occasions, the flights had been chartered so that Mkhize, who at the time was Premier, could attend weddings or funerals. A spokesman said that the flights were a legitimate use of state funds because Mkhize had been invited to the events in his capacity as Premier. Mkhize ultimately said that he would repay the costs of the flights if asked to do so by the incumbent Premier, a response which the Business Day described as having "disarmed" his critics.

=== Public Investment Corporation ===
Following Mkhize's term as ANC Treasurer-General, newspapers reported on two separate incidents in which Mkhize had allegedly abused his political influence while holding that position. Both incidents concerned the Public Investment Corporation (PIC). First, in 2018, the Sunday Times reported that Mkhize appeared to have earned a R4.5 million kickback for facilitating a R210 million loan from the PIC to an oil company. Second, in 2019, the former head of the PIC, testifying to a public inquiry about political interference in the PIC, claimed that Mkhize had pressured him into asking PIC beneficiaries to contribute donations towards an ANC political event. Mkhize denied both reports, and they were not tested in court.

== Personal life ==
Mkhize is married to May Mashego, whom he met as a teenager at Dlangezwa school. She attended medical school with Mkhize and is a medical doctor and businesswoman. Together, they have two daughters, Naledi and Nokulinda, and a son, Dedani. Mkhize maintains a homestead in Willowfontein, his birthplace in KwaZulu-Natal, and has said that in his retirement he would like to pursue his passion for cattle farming.

Political offices
Preceded by Aaron Motsoaledi	Minister of Health; 2019–2021	Incumbent
Preceded by Des van Rooyen	Minister of Cooperative Governance and Traditional Affairs; 2018–2019	Succeeded by Nkosazana Dlamini-Zuma
Preceded by S'bu Ndebele	Premier of KwaZulu-Natal; 2009–2013	Succeeded by Senzo Mchunu
Party political offices
Preceded by Mathews Phosa	Treasurer General of the African National Congress; 2012–2017	Succeeded by Paul Mashatile
