= Bhekisisa Centre for Health Journalism =

Nonprofit health media organisation in South Africa

- Founded: 2013
- Founder: Mia Malan
- Type: Nonprofit
- Purpose: Health journalism, Public health
- Location: Johannesburg, South Africa
- Website: bhekisisa.org

The Bhekisisa Centre for Health Journalism is a non-profit media group based in South Africa. The name Bhekisisa means "take a close look" in the Zulu language. The centre focuses on health coverage from a social justice perspective, using solutions- and narrative-based journalism.

Bhekisisa's reporting on healthcare in South Africa and the broader African continent is frequently republished by news outlets such as the Daily Maverick, News24, and the Mail & Guardian. The University of Oxford's Reuters Institute for the Study of Journalism listed it among the leading health sources referenced by online users in South Africa in its 2021 Digital News Report. In 2021, Bhekisisa became the first media organisation to receive the Reconciliation Award from the Institute for Justice and Reconciliation.

== History ==
Bhekisisa was established in 2013 as the health desk of the Mail & Guardian newspaper and was founded by journalist Mia Malan. In 2015, it was registered as a non-profit organization. In July 2019, it became an independent media group, separate from the Mail & Guardian. As of November 2023, the organisation had 20 full- and part-time staff members.

In August 2022, Bhekisisa launched a television programme called Health Beat.

== Funding and governance ==
The Bill & Melinda Gates Foundation has been Bhekisisa's main donor since 2015. The foundation has awarded the organisation several grants, including $1,295,442 in February 2018 and $2,694,740 in March 2021. Other funders include the Millennium Trust and the Wellcome Trust.

A 2018 master's thesis written by a former Bhekisisa reporter for the University of the Witwatersrand analysed the impact of donor funding on the organisation's content. The study concluded that while donors could exert "subtle editorial influence," their funding was also an enabler of "quality health journalism."

== COVID-19 ==
During the COVID-19 pandemic, Bhekisisa partnered with the data journalism newsroom Media Hack Collective to publish a daily data dashboard. According to the Global Investigative Journalism Network, the dashboard was used by the SABC and government departments. In an interview with the Reuters Institute for the Study of Journalism, Mia Malan stated, "Our map has become … one of the country’s most credible sources for COVID-19 information." A report by Media Monitoring Africa and the Africa Data Hub found that Bhekisisa's COVID-19 coverage "outperformed nine other major African media organisations".

Malan's op-ed on the Omicron variant-related travel ban was referenced at a World Health Organization’s ACT Accelerator Council meeting in December 2021 to highlight the damaging effect of the ban on variant research.

== Awards and recognition ==
Bhekisisa and its journalists have received a number of awards.

- 2022: The Bhekisisa team received a merit award from the National Press Club for its COVID-19 reporting. Mia Malan won the Standard Bank Sikuvile Column of the Year award for her op-ed on the Omicron travel ban.
- 2021: The organisation received the Reconciliation Award from the Institute for Justice and Reconciliation.
- 2020: Joan van Dyk was a finalist in the Standard Bank Sikuvile Journalism Awards for her article on the death of a child at the Lindela Repatriation Centre. The story reported on the impact of alleged corruption at Bosasa on migrant healthcare and resulted in litigation by the organisation Pro Bono.
- 2018: Pontsho Pilane’s #FreetoBleed series on the cost of menstrual products won the Discovery Health Journalist of the Year award. Following a presentation by Pilane to Parliament, the South African government made menstrual products tax-free in 2019.
- 2016: Mia Malan won the CNN MultiChoice African Journalist Award (features category) and the Standard Bank Sikuvile Award for feature stories for her article on rape in Diepsloot. She also won the Gauteng regional award for print features at the Vodacom Journalist of the Year awards.
- 2014: Malan won the Standard Bank Sikuvile Award for feature stories for her 2013 report on botched circumcisions during ulwaluko initiation ceremonies.
