= Tlhabi =

Tlhabi is a surname. Notable people with the surname include:

- Lesego Tlhabi (born 1988), South African writer and comedian
- Redi Tlhabi (born 1978), South African journalist
