= Gordon Green (pianist) =

English pianist and pedagogue (1905–1981)

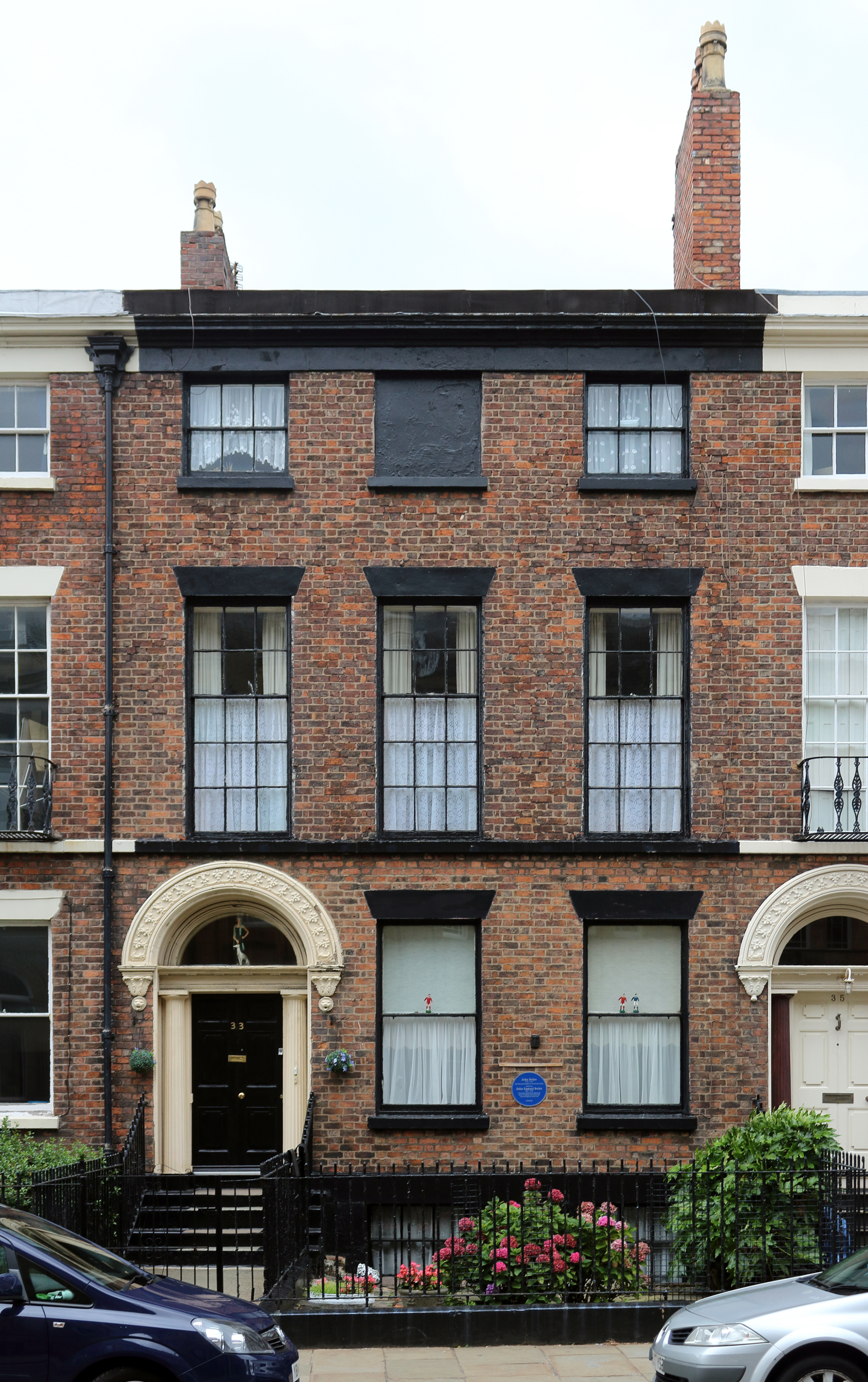
Gordon Green lived on 33 Hope Street, Liverpool where he taught many pianists who have gone on to international concert careers including Stephen Hough.

Gordon Green, OBE (1905–1981) was an English pianist and pedagogue. Early on he was appointed Director of the Liverpool School of Music (1935), and subsequently taught at both the Royal Manchester College of Music (now known as Royal Northern College of Music) and at the Royal Academy of Music, London. In 1972, Green received an honorary degree (Hon MA) from the University of Liverpool.

== Biography ==
=== Education ===
Gordon Green was born in Barnsley, just outside the village of Darton, England. The son of the local headteacher, he started piano at first with his mother and then with a local visiting pianist who would come to his school to play for the children. He attended Wakefield Grammar school and was subsequently educated at the Royal Manchester College of Music (RMCM), where he studied with Franck Merrick. At the end of his studies, he won the Gold Medal (1926) which included lessons with Egon Petri in Poland. The first time Green's name is encountered in the college's archives, is in connection to an examination concert (8 July 1925) playing the first movement of Brahms' F minor Piano Sonata. His name is also mentioned soon after on March 9, 1926, when Green performed Bach's double piano concerto in C minor with composer and close friend Alan Rawsthorne.

=== Career ===
Gordon Green became teacher of piano at the RMCM in the summer of 1945, and as a performer made appearances with orchestras such as the BBC Philharmonic, the Liverpool Philharmonic Orchestra, and Hallé Orchestra. Green is also the dedicatee of Alan Rawsthorne's Ballade in G♯ minor (1929), and the Four Bagatelles (1938). Moreover, he gave the premiere of Rawsthorne's Valse in c minor (c. 1927). He was also the performer of Rawsthorne's Piano Concerto: Green's own score is preserved in the RNCM Archives and contains some of his practice annotations and separate notes. Gordon Green was the first pianist to perform works by Hindemith in England (1934), although his colleague at the RMCM, Franz Reizenstein, is credited with being the first to perform the composer's Three Sonatas in a concert at Wigmore Hall (1938).

=== Green the educator ===
Despite having studied with Egon Petri, a former pupil of Ferruccio Busoni, Green considered himself a Leschetizkian, at least according to former pupils' accounts such as Martino Tirimo and Philip Fowke. This brings Green in closer alignment with his previous teacher, Franck Merrick, who had studied with Leschetizky. From the published concert reviews as well as his own extensive editing and preface comments on the use of the pedal, it becomes clear that sound was of paramount importance. Furthermore, his interest in more modern repertoire, such as Bartok, Hindemith, Prokofiev, Falla, and the outputs of his contemporaries Rawsthorne, Pitfield and Arnold Bax among others, alongside canonic repertoire, such as works by Brahms, Liszt, Chopin, must have imbued his teaching with wider-ranging views on interpretation.

=== Notable pupils ===
Green's numerous pupils include several concert artists and conservatoire professors, such as Philip Fowke (b. 1950), Martino Tirimo (b. 1942), Sir Stephen Hough (b. 1961), Martin Roscoe (b. 1952), Stephen Coombs (b. 1960), John P. R. Blakely (b. 1947), Peter Bithell, Tessa Uys (b. 1948), Martin Jones (b. 1940), Richard McMahon, Christian Blackshaw, MBE (b. 1949), Harold James Taylor (1925–2014), John McCabe (1939–2015), Malcolm Lipkin (1932–2017), Tessa Uys (b. 1948), Heather Slade-Lipkin (1947–2017). Other notable musicians who trained with him during the course of their studies include Gordon Fergus-Thompson (b. 1952), Peter Donohoe, CBE (b. 1953), conductor Sir Simon Rattle (b. 1955) among many others. He also coached John Ogdon (1937–1989) for his participation in the 1962 Tchaikovsky International Piano Competition, in which Ogdon won first prize (ex-aequo with Vladimir Ashkenazy).

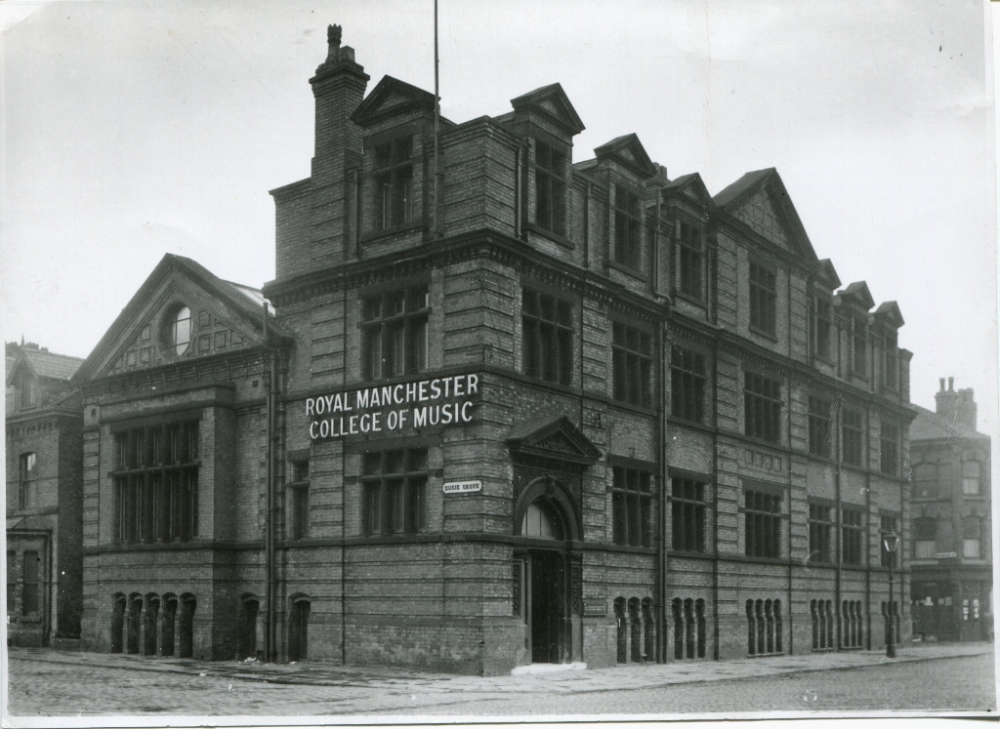
Royal Manchester College of Music

=== Activities and sources ===
Later in his life, Green joined the teaching staff of the Royal Academy of Music in London. His hour-long interview with Alan Rawsthorne on BBC Radio 3 has been preserved as a non-digitised tape located in the British Library's Sound and Moving Image catalogue. However, the broadcasts of his performances are now considered nonextant. What remains is the majority of the concert reviews and notices available through the British Newspaper Archive and The Musical Times (usually in the section Music in the Provinces). Among the few direct sources salvaged however, there is Gordon Green's edition of selected Liszt pieces for Oxford University Press, his letter to the editor printed in the Liverpool Daily Post (Music in Soviet Russia) and an essay titled 'Alan Rawsthorne: The Pre-War Years'. In the summer of 1980, few months before Green's death, a Hope Street Festival concert was presented featuring Stephen Hough, Martino Tirimo and Christian Blackshaw performing concertos with the Royal Liverpool Philharmonic Orchestra under Sir Charles Groves in his honour (see relevant mention in Stephen Hough's interview to the Liverpool Daily Post, 1983).

Following his death, the Gordon Green Memorial Scholarship was instituted at the Royal Northern College of Music. In the Musical Times of 1985 there is indeed a notice of John Ogdon's recital in aid of this fund. Nowadays, Green's presence is felt through scattered references, such as in Christopher Headington's journal article on Malcolm Lipkin and His Recent Music, the slightly more extensive mention in Hamish Good's The Music of Malcolm Lipkin, or McCabe's interview. Quite a few of his former pupils have been active in their efforts to commemorate or otherwise pay tribute to Green, including Stephen Hough (see references in his book Rough Ideas, but also in his interviews and posts on social media), Philip Fowke, Martino Tirimo. More specifically, such efforts include Philip Fowke's lengthy interview to Alistair Hogarth and a forthcoming PhD thesis (2023) by Natalie Tsaldarakis which includes previously unpublished material and sources (City, University of London, supervisor: Dr. Ian Pace).

Gordon Green was conferred a diamond jubilee year Fellowship from the Manchester College of Music (FRMCM Honorary Fellow) in 1953. He died from cancer in 1981, shortly after being conferred OBE in the Queen's New Year Honours List 1981.
