= Giving It Away =

2020 book by Paul Carey Jones

Giving It Away: Classical Music in Lockdown and other fairytales
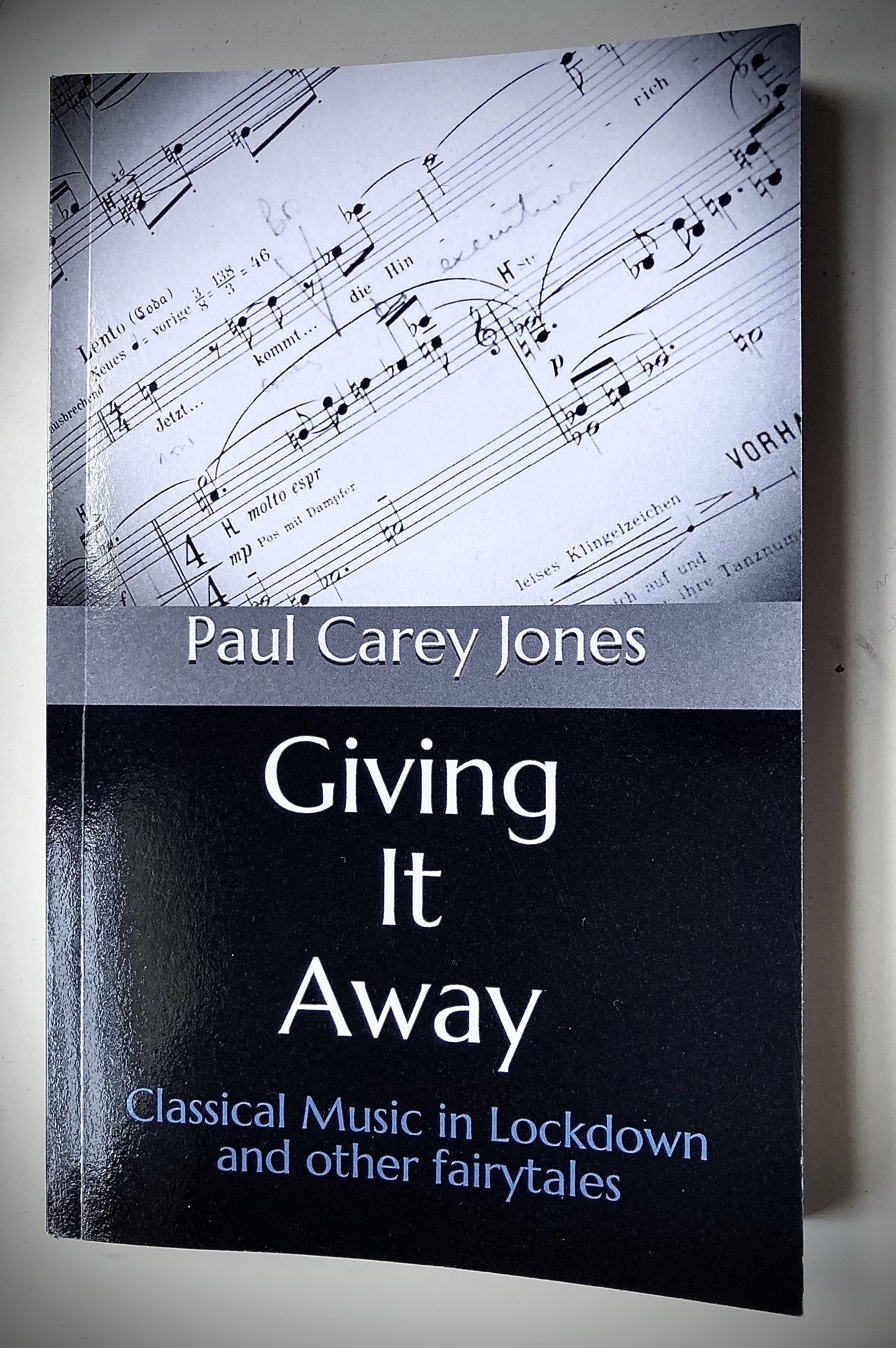
- Paperback edition
- Author: Paul Carey Jones
- Language: English
- Subject: Classical music
- Genre: Non-fiction
- Publisher: CJAC Publishing in association with Amazon KDP
- Publication date: October 2020
- Publication place: United Kingdom
- Media type: Print (hardcover, paperback), audio, Kindle
- Pages: 216
- ISBN: 979-8552628056

Giving It Away: Classical Music in Lockdown and Other Fairytales is a 2020 book by opera singer Paul Carey Jones.

The book consists of a series of non-fiction essay-style blog posts, presented contemporaneously during the events of the early stages of the coronavirus pandemic.

== Synopsis ==
Part One is titled Drilling Holes in the Titanic, and consists of chapters dated chronologically from 17 March 2020 to 24 October 2020. They cover subjects including the author's own experience of the pandemic, including the progression of his own infection with COVID-19 during April 2020, as well as observations on the classical music industry's response to lockdown.

Part Two is titled Conversations With Wotan, and consists of a collection of four essays discussing the author's thoughts on learning the role of Wotan in Richard Wagner's Ring cycle. Part Three is titled Orally Fixated, and is a collection of six articles on various topics, mostly relating to the author's operatic career, including the death of Tosca and diversity in the opera industry.

== Reception ==
The book was first reviewed by George Hall in BBC Music Magazine in March 2021. Hall praised the author's assessment of the opera industry: "His view is alert and complex, evaluating developments with a searching but sceptical eye". He also commented on the second and third parts of the book, noting that they cover "other matters largely vocal and all worth encountering."

Writing for Opera Magazine in June 2021, Mark Valencia described the book as "a powerful traversal of life in the pandemic". Valencia judged that the "book's subtitle is a misnomer" since the book largely deals solely with the concerns of the opera industry, "not the wider realms of classical music", and also felt that the book is "on the short side". However, he praised the author's "keen intellect that he applies with fluency and wit", and refers readers to the author's regular online blog to keep "up to speed with the Carey Jones brain."

For Art Scene, Mike Smith described the writing as "stylish and hard-hitting", while noting the author's often critical view of the response of both government and industry to the crisis faced by arts freelancers as a result of the pandemic.

In her review of Nicholas Kenyon's The Life of Music for the Times Literary Supplement, while discussing Kenyon's essentially optimistic view of the future of classical music broadcasting online, Anna Picard suggests "for an alternative view, read the bass-baritone Paul Carey Jones's Covid diary, Giving It Away".
