= Richard McMahon =

Richard McMahon may refer to:

- Richard McMahon (pianist), English pianist and music professor
- Richard McMahon (bailiff), British barrister and Bailiff of Guernsey
- Richard Randolph McMahon, lawyer from West Virginia
