= Khwezi =

Khwezi could refer to either of the following:

- Khwezi (book), a non-fiction South African book on the life of Fezekile Ntsukela Kuzwayo.
- Khwezi Sifunda, a South African musician and businessman.
