= Institute for Justice and Reconciliation =

- Founded: 2000
- Type: Non-Government Organisation, Think Tank
- Location: Cape Town, South Africa
- Website: www.ijr.org.za

The Institute for Justice and Reconciliation (IJR) is a non-governmental organisation and think tank based in Cape Town, South Africa. It was forged out of the country's Truth and Reconciliation Commission in 2000. The aim was to ensure that lessons learnt from South Africa's transition from apartheid to democracy were taken into account as the nation moved ahead. Archbishop Emeritus Desmond Tutu was the patron of the IJR.

== Overview ==
The Institute's vision is to build fair, democratic and inclusive societies in Africa. Through carefully selected engagements and interventions, the IJR seeks to shape national approaches to transitional justice and reconciliation in Africa by drawing on community intelligence as well as macro-trend research and comparative analysis. The IJR publishes its research, makes policy recommendation, and performs reconciliation work on the ground.

The South African Reconciliation Barometer and the Transformation Audit are two of the annual publications that are based on the IJR's in-house research and analysis. The IJR is core partner of the Afrobarometer since 2013, managing the implementation of the barometer and its research for the Southern Africa region.

IJR's main mission is to keep reconciliation and social justice on South Africa's and Africa's agenda. Evidence shows clear links between economic growth, development, peace and reconciliation, especially where societies resolve conflict and democratise.

The Institute annually recognises the contributions of others to the field of justice and reconciliation through the IJR Reconciliation Award, with past winners including Brigalia Bam, Pieter-Dirk Uys and Albie Sachs.

Archbishop Emeritus Desmond Tutu is the Institute's patron. Its Board of Directors includes Professor Brian O'Connel, Justice Richard Goldstone, Advocate Dumisa Ntsebeza, Louise Asmal and Dr Pumla Gobodo-Madikizela. Dr Fanie du Toit, who has been with the IJR since its establishment, is the Executive Director.

In 2008 the IJR won the UNESCO International Prize for Peace Education for its part in shaping post-apartheid history education in South Africa.

== Programmes ==
=== Peacebuilding Interventions Programme ===
The Peacebuilding Interventions Programme works to develop and implement initiatives that contribute to the building of fair, democratic, and inclusive societies. It seeks to achieve a creative balance between justice and reconciliation, development and human security, as well as contributing to the reconstruction of countries ravaged by war and oppression. The programme facilitates this through three complementary and mutually supportive levels: engaged research and analysis, capacity building and collaborative political intervention. The Head of the PBI Programme is Professor Tim Murithi.

=== Research and Policy Programme ===
Through original public opinion research and enquiry about the linkages between development, social cohesion, and reconciliation, the Research and Policy (RP) Programme of the IJR, seeks to provide an empirical basis for the organisation’s interventions, and the policy positions that it champions across the African continent. The Head of the RP Programme is Jan Hofmyer.

=== Sustained Dialogues Programme ===
The Sustained Dialogues Programme works to acknowledge, confront, and engage through dialogue with the enduring legacies that continue to marginalize, wound, and cause injustice. Sustained Dialogues works to overcome these barriers through creative, meaningful initiatives to foster and sustain reconciliation within and between individuals and communities. Their achievements for 2016 were reported against each Medium-Term Outcome (MTO) set by IJR. BIS Programme projects worked towards influencing all MTOs to varying degrees. The Head of the SD Programme is Felicity Harrison.

=== Communication, Advocacy & Strategy Programme ===
The Communication, Advocacy and Strategy programme at the IJR drives all cross-cutting issues within the organisation, works closely with programmes and assists with planning, coordination and fundraising capacity. The programme takes on its own content and designs projects to communicate messages of Reconciliation and Justice to assist in ensuring sustainability of the IJR. The programme seeks to engage in a relevant way that informs, advocates and sets the agenda for justice and reconciliation.

== See also ==
- Conflict resolution
- Reconciliation Award
- Desmond Tutu

== Links ==
- IJR Website
