= Stephen Hough =

British music educator, pianist and academic

Sir Stephen Hough CBE
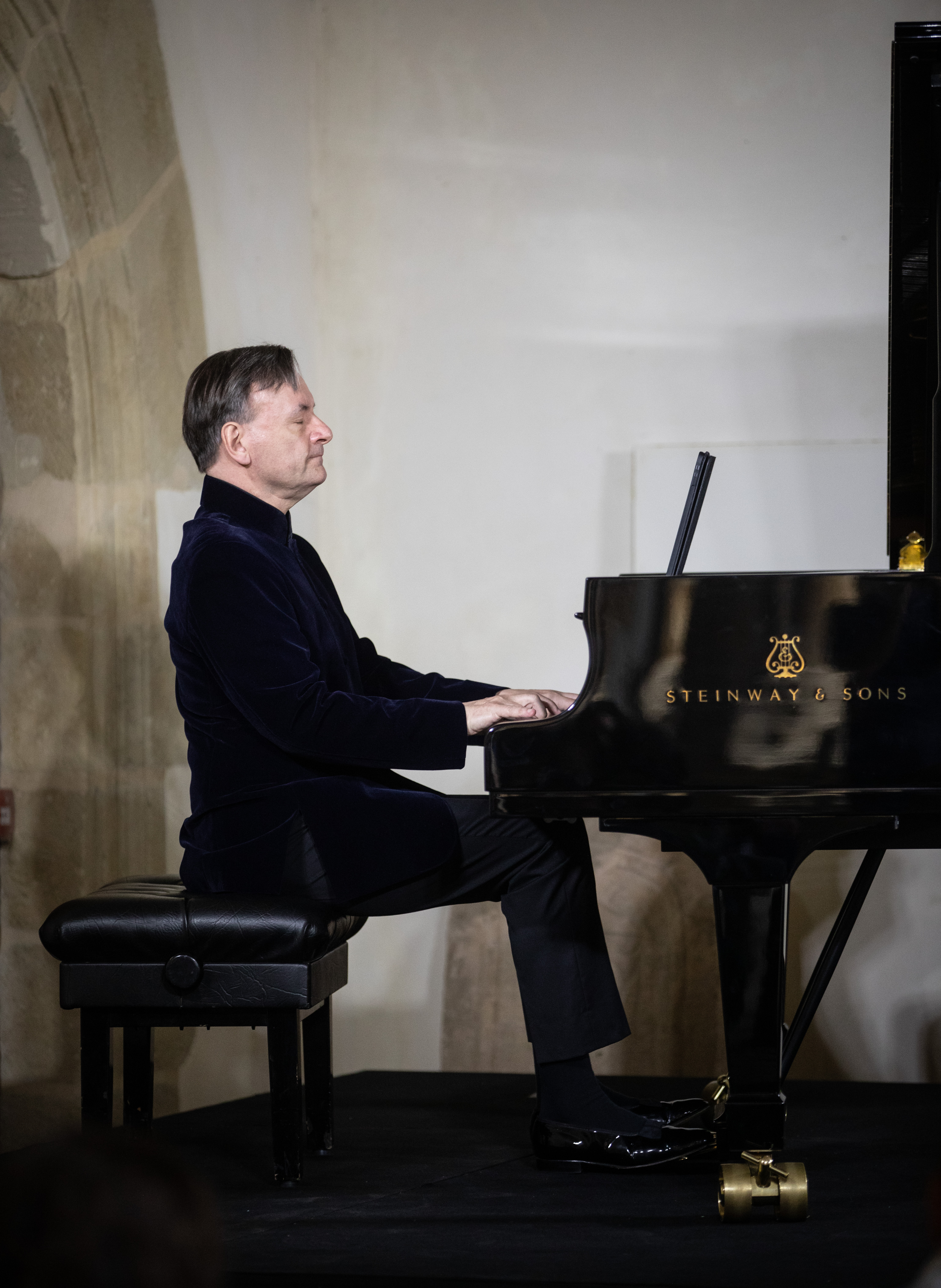
- Hough in San Sebastián, Spain, 2021
- Born: 22 November 1961 (age 64); Heswall, Wirral, England
- Occupations: Composer, pianist, writer

Sir Stephen Andrew Gill Hough (/ˈhʌf/; born 22 November 1961) is a British and Australian classical pianist, composer and writer.

== Life and career ==
Hough was born in Heswall, then in Cheshire, on the Wirral Peninsula and grew up in Thelwall where he began piano lessons at the age of five. His father, who was born in Australia, worked as a technical representative for British Steel before his death at the age of 54.

At an early age, Hough was able to memorise approximately 100 nursery rhymes. After much pleading, his parents agreed to buy a second-hand piano for £5 from a local antique shop. At the age of 12 he suffered what he has described as a "mini-nervous breakdown", triggered by a mugging incident, which resulted in him taking almost a year off school.

Hough studied at Chetham's School of Music, which he later called "not a wonderful place while I was there", and at the Royal Northern College of Music. In 1978, he was a finalist in the BBC Young Musician of the Year competition and won the piano section. In 1982, he won the Terence Judd Award in England. In 1983, he took first prize at the Naumburg International Piano Competition in New York City. In 1985, he was a soloist with the Naumburg Orchestral Concerts, in the Naumburg Bandshell summer series in Central Park.

Hough holds a master's degree from the Juilliard School, where his studies were assisted by the receipt of the first Royal Philharmonic Society Julius Isserlis Scholarship for study abroad. He has studied with Heather Slade-Lipkin, Gordon Green, Adele Marcus, Martin Canin, and Derrick Wyndham. A prominent soloist, he is also a composer and transcriber and often includes his own works in his recitals. He has published over 30 pieces. His cello concerto, written for Steven Isserlis, premiered in 2007. Also in 2007, Westminster Abbey and Westminster Cathedral performed Mass settings that he wrote for them.

In 2009, members of the Berlin Philharmonic premiered Hough's trio for piccolo, contrabassoon and piano (Was mit den Traenen geschieht) at the Philharmonie. His song cycles Herbstlieder (2007), Other Love Songs (2010) and Dappled Things (2016) were premiered by members of the Prince Consort. He premiered his Sonata for Piano (broken branches) at the Wigmore Hall in 2011. In 2012, the Indianapolis Symphony Orchestra and Symphonic Choir gave the world premiere of the orchestrated version of his Missa Mirabilis. The Colorado Symphony and Andrew Litton recorded this work for Hyperion Records in 2015. Hough has written four piano sonatas, Partita and Sonatina Nostalgica for solo piano, and the test piece, Fanfare Toccata, for the 2022 Van Cliburn International Piano Competition. The Takacs Quartet commissioned his string quartet and recorded it for Hyperion Records. The Utah Symphony commissioned his The World of Yesterday piano concerto and premiered it in 2024. The European co-commissioner, The Hallé, recorded the piece for Hyperion in 2024 with Sir Mark Elder.

In 2020, Hough's essay collection, Rough Ideas, won the Royal Philharmonic Society Award in the storytelling category. Faber published his memoir, Enough: Scenes of Childhood, in 2023.

At the 2024 Last Night of the Proms, Hough accompanied the soprano Angel Blue in his own arrangement of two spirituals and was also the soloist in Saint-Saëns's Egyptian Concerto, followed by an encore of his own fantasia on "Supercalifragilisticexpialidocious".

In 2025, Hough's piano concerto The World of Yesterday had its Asian premiere at the Esplanade show in Singapore with the Singapore Symphony Orchestra and conductor Rodolfo Barraez.

== Recordings ==
Hough has recorded more than 60 albums, one of his most notable being a set of the four Rachmaninoff piano concertos and the Rhapsody on a Theme of Paganini, recorded during live performances with the Dallas Symphony Orchestra under then music director Andrew Litton, which have been compared to Rachmaninoff's own recordings. These recordings won him his seventh Gramophone Award as well as the Classical BRIT Critics Award.

Hough's recording of Saint-Saëns's piano concertos won the Gramophone Record of the Year in 2001 and was later voted the Gold Disc, "winner of winners" in a poll commemorating 30 years of the award. His recording of the complete Chopin waltzes won the Diapason d'Or de l'Année in 2011.

Hough is also known for championing lesser-known composers considered outside the standard repertoire, such as Johann Nepomuk Hummel, Xaver Scharwenka, York Bowen, and Federico Mompou.

Hough's compositions can be heard on the BIS Records album Broken Branches and on the Prince Consort album Other Love Songs, on Linn Records. His second piano sonata (notturno luminoso) appears on his album In The Night, and his cello sonata on a recital disc with Steven Isserlis. His sequence Hallowed for unaccompanied choir was recorded by Harry Christophers and The Sixteen on their CD 'Star of Heaven'. Yo-Yo Ma recorded two of his transcriptions on his album with Kathryn Stott, Song of Comfort and Hope. Hough's fourth piano sonata is the title track on his 2021 album Vida Breve. The Takacs Quartet recorded his String Quartet for Hyperion.

In 2017, Pentatone-Oxingale Records released an album commemorating the inaugural opening of the Tippet Rise Festival, featuring Hough, Christopher O'Riley, and Matt Haimovitz, among others.

== Teaching and writing ==
Hough is a visiting professor of piano at the Royal Academy of Music in London and the International Chair of Piano Studies at the Royal Northern College of Music in Manchester. He is also on the faculty of the Juilliard School.

Hough joined the Roman Catholic Church when he was 19. Twice in his life he considered becoming a priest, in particular joining the Franciscan Order.

Hough has written about his homosexuality and its relationship with both his music-making and his religion. For 15 years, following his Catholic conversion, he was celibate. In 2007, he published The Bible as Prayer: a handbook for lectio divina.

Nosing Around, his little book on perfume, was published in 2014. In 2018, Sylph Editions published his first novel, The Final Retreat, which explores the inner world of a priest dealing with sex addiction and religious despair. His book Rough Ideas: reflections on music and more is a collection of essays and short musings published by Faber & Faber in 2019 and by Farrar, Straus and Giroux in 2020. In February 2023, Faber published his memoir Enough: Scenes from Childhood.

In 2008, Hough won the Sixth International Poetry Competition.

From 2010 to 2015, he wrote a blog for The Daily Telegraph.

== Other activities ==
Hough had a solo exhibition of his paintings at the Broadbent Gallery in London in October 2012.

In October 2016, Hough was the guest on BBC Radio 4's Desert Island Discs. His choices were Cortot's recording of Chopin's Prélude No. 17 in A-flat, Rachmaninoff's recording of Kreisler's Liebesleid, Led Zeppelin's Stairway to Heaven, the Kyrie eleison from Bach's Mass in B minor, the third movement of Alban Berg's Lyric Suite, his own sonata for cello and piano left hand ("Les adieux"), and Bird Songs at Eventide by Eric Coates. His favourite was "Proficiscere, anima Christiana (Go Forth)" from Elgar's The Dream of Gerontius. His book choice was a bilingual edition of Proust's À la recherche du temps perdu, and his luxury item was a panama hat. He made a special request for a copy of the Tyndale Bible.

== Australian connections ==
Hough's father was born an only child in Mayfield, a suburb of Newcastle, New South Wales, in 1926. Before his first birthday his mother took him to England, settling in the North, and leaving her husband behind in Australia. The boy was always told his father had died, but in fact his father lived 30 more years, working in the steel industry at Newcastle. Hough's grandfather wrote Hough's father letters, none of which he ever received.

Hough says his assumption of Australian citizenship was in part a tribute to his father, who wanted to return to the land of his birth but was unable to do so before his death in 1980 at the age of 54.

== Honours ==
Hough is an honorary member of the Royal Academy of Music in London, where he is a visiting professor, a companion of the Royal Northern College of Music in Manchester, where he is the international chair of piano studies, and an honorary fellow of the Guildhall School of Music and Drama. He received an honorary doctorate from the University of Liverpool in 2011.

In 2001, Hough became the first classical music performer to receive a MacArthur Fellowship. In 2009, The Economist and Intelligent Life magazines named him one of 20 living polymaths. In 2010, he was named Instrumentalist of the Year at the Royal Philharmonic Society Music Awards. He was a governor of the Royal Ballet companies (the Royal Ballet, the Birmingham Royal Ballet and the Royal Ballet School). He is a patron of the charity The Nightingale Project, which takes music and art into hospitals and of Music in Prisons (Irene Taylor Trust).

Hough was appointed a Commander of the Order of the British Empire (CBE) in the 2014 New Year Honours for services to music. He was made an Honorary Bencher of the Middle Temple in 2017. In 2018, he was made an honorary member of the Royal Philharmonic Society. From 2019 to 2022 he was a visiting fellow at Lady Margaret Hall at the University of Oxford. In 2024, he was made an honorary fellow of Girton College, Cambridge. He was created a Knight Bachelor, for services to music, in the Queen's 2022 Birthday Honours.

== Works by Hough ==
=== Books ===
- The Bible as Prayer: A Handbook for Lectio Divina (2007) ISBN 9780809145072
- Nosing Around (2014)
- The Final Retreat (2018) ISBN 978-1-909631-28-1
- Rough Ideas: Reflections on Music and More (2019) ISBN 978-0-57-135047-6
- Enough: Scenes from Childhood (2023) ISBN 978-0-57-136289-9

=== Selected discography ===
- Hummel: Piano Concerto No. 3 in B minor, Op.89; Piano Concerto No. 2 in A minor, Op.85: English Chamber Orchestra (Chandos, 1987, CHAN 8507)
- Stephen Hough: Liszt (Virgin Classics, 1988)
- My Favorite Things: Virtuoso Encores (MusicMasters, 1988; re-released by Virgin Classics as The Piano Album 1, 1993, VC7595092)
- Robert Schumann: Fantasie and Davidbündlertänze (Virgin Classics, 1989, VC90770-2)
- The Piano Album 2 (Virgin Classics, 1993, VC7593042)
- Benjamin Britten: Holiday Diary, the piano music (EMI)
- Xaver Scharwenka: Piano Concerto No. 4 in F minor and Emil von Sauer: Piano Concerto No.1 in E minor (City of Birmingham Symphony Orchestra conducted by Lawrence Foster, Hyperion, 1994, CDA66790)
- Piano Music by York Bowen (Hyperion, 1996)
- Lowell Liebermann: Piano Concertos (Hyperion, 1997)
- Piano Music by Federico Mompou (Hyperion, 1997)
- Brahms: Piano Concertos Nos. 1 and 2, BBC Symphony Orchestra (Virgin Classics 1998)
- New York Variations (Hyperion, 1998)
- Stephen Hough's New Piano Album (Hyperion, 1999, CDA67043)
- Saint-Saëns: The Complete Works for Piano and Orchestra, City of Birmingham Symphony Orchestra (Hyperion, 2001)
- Stephen Hough's English Piano Album (Hyperion, 2002)
- Hummel: Piano Sonatas (Hyperion, 2003)
- Rachmaninoff: Piano Concertos Nos. 1, 2, 3 and 4; Rhapsody on a Theme of Paganini; Andrew Litton/Dallas Symphony Orchestra (Hyperion CDA67501/2)
- The Stephen Hough Piano Collection (Hyperion, 2005)
- Liszt: Années de pèlerinage – "Première Année: Suisse", S. 160 (Hyperion, 2005)
- Stephen Hough's Spanish Album (Hyperion, 2005, CDA67565)
- George Tsontakis: Man of Sorrows for piano & orchestra (Hyperion, 2007) - includes solo works by Schoenberg, Berg and Webern
- Mozart Album (Hyperion, 2007)
- Stephen Hough in Recital (2009)
- Chopin: Late Masterpieces (Hyperion, 2010)
- Tchaikovsky: Complete music for piano and orchestra (Hyperion, 2010)
- Chopin: Complete Waltzes (Hyperion, 2011)
- Franz Liszt & Edvard Grieg: Piano Concertos (Hyperion, 2011)
- Stephen Hough: Broken Branches (BIS, 2011)
- Stephen Hough's French Album (Hyperion, 2012, CDA67890)
- Brahms: Piano Concertos Nos. 1 and 2, Mozarteum Orchestra Salzburg (Hyperion, 2013, CDA67961)
- Stephen Hough: In the Night – includes Robert Schumann's Carnaval and Hough's own Sonata No 2, 'Notturno luminoso' (Hyperion, 2014, CDA67996)
- Edvard Grieg: Lyric Pieces (Hyperion, 2015, CDA68070)
- Alexander Scriabin & Leoš Janáček: Sonatas & Poems (Hyperion, 2015, CDA67895)
- Antonín Dvořák & Robert Schumann: Concertos, City of Birmingham Symphony Orchestra & Andris Nelsons
- Stephen Hough's Dream Album (Hyperion, 2018, CDA68176)
- Brahms: The Final Piano Pieces (Hyperion, 2020, CDA68116)
- Beethoven Piano Concertos (2020)
- Vida Breve (Hyperion, 2021, CDA68260)
- Schumann: Kreisleriana, Arabeske and Fantasie (2021)
- Chopin: Complete Nocturnes (2021)
- Schubert: Sonatas D664, 769a and 894 (2022)
- Mompou: Musica Callada (2023)
- Hough: Piano Concerto, Sonatina & Partita (2025)
