= Tessa Uys =

Concert pianist

Tessa Uys is a concert pianist. She was taught to play by her mother Helga Bassel in South Africa. She made her concert debut at the age of 13 and performed with both her mother and father, Hannes Uys, who was also a concert pianist. She went to the Royal Academy of Music in London in 1967 where she studied under Gordon Green. In her final year at the college, she won the Macfarren Medal. She subsequently made her home in Highgate.

Her mother died in 1969 and, when her father died too in 1990, Tessa donated her mother's Blüthner grand piano to the Jewish Museum in Berlin. The piano had been brought to South Africa when she moved there as a Jewish refugee from Germany.

Her brother, Pieter-Dirk, is a satirist in South Africa.
