= Helga Uys =

- Born: Helga Maria Bassel; 2 July 1908; Berlin, Germany
- Died: 26 May 1969 (aged 60); Cape Town, South Africa
- Occupations: Pianist, music teacher
- Children: Tessa Uys; Pieter-Dirk Uys

Helga Uys (July 2, 1908 - May 26, 1969) was a German-born South African concert pianist and piano teacher of Jewish descent. She was married to Hannes Uys and they had two children, the concert pianist Tessa Uys, and the award-winning satirist, stage artist, and writer Pieter-Dirk Uys.

== Biography ==
=== Early years ===
Uys was born Helga Maria Bassel in 1908 in Berlin. Her father was a cantor in a Viennese synagogue. She studied piano in Berlin, and by the 1930s was a well-known concert pianist in Germany.

=== Rise of Nazism in Germany ===
Her non-Jewish fiancé, Franz Michels, a professor of geology and a composer, was put under pressure by the Nazi authorities to break off the engagement, despite the fact that she had documents that proved her conversion to Christianity.

In 1935, she was expelled from the Reichsmusikkammer, an important professional body, by the Reichskulturkammer, a Nazi cultural authority set up in 1933 to expel Jewish artists. Although the Nazi authorities did not provide an explanation for their decision, subsequent research by Aubrey Pomerance, the chief archivist at the Berlin Jewish Museum, established that Uys was under Nazi regulations as " fully-Jewish", and therefore could not be treated differently from other Jews, even though she converted to Christianity in 1933.

In 1936, when a friend of her former fiancée gave her a hint that even worse persecution could be expected, she and her brother Gerhard fled to South Africa with Franz's help, where she could continue her music career and reunite with her parents. She was able to take her piano with her to South Africa. The piano was built in 1913 by Blüthner, the piano manufacturer in Leipzig; Uys bought it second-hand in Berlin in 1930.

=== Life in South Africa ===
Uys arrived to Cape Town in 1937. One of her first engagements as a pianist was with the Cape Town Orchestra in the City Hall, playing a Mozart concert for two pianos. The other pianist was an Afrikaner called Hannes Uys, a Calvinist Afrikaner of Dutch and Belgian Huguenot descent who played in the Dutch Reformed Church. They married in 1943 and moved to Pinelands, where they had two children, Tessa and Pieter-Dirk. Their children were raised in the Calvinist tradition of the Dutch Reformed Church of their father, and the topic of her Jewishness was never discussed, encouraging her children to be proud of their Afrikanerdom. Uys continued her career in South Africa as a music teacher and concert performer in Cape Town.

=== Death ===
Uys suffered from bipolar disorder. She committed suicide in 1969, at the age of 60, following a prescription mix-up that made her lose her performer’s control of her fingertips. Only in 2003, after her daughter Tessa went through her mother's documents at the Berlin Jewish Museum, she found out with the help of Aubrey Pomerance, head of the archives. has that her mother was fully Jewish. After negotiations with Pomerance, it was decided Uys' piano was to be returned to Berlin. Uys's Blüthner piano was last played in February 2004 in the family home in Cape Town. The next day, the piano was taken back to Blüthner's works in Leipzig to be restored, before being permanently exhibited in the Berlin Jewish Museum.
