= Christian Blackshaw =

British classical pianist

Christian Charles Blackshaw MBE (born 18 January 1949, in Cheshire, England) is a British classical pianist.

He was educated at The King's School, Macclesfield. In his teens he played oboe (as well as piano) in the Stockport Youth Orchestra in Greater Manchester. He studied at the Royal Northern College of Music, and at the Royal Academy of Music with Gordon Green. He then studied at the Saint Petersburg Conservatory under Moisei Halfin. He was later tutored in London by Clifford Curzon.

Blackshaw lives between London and Suffolk, and has three daughters. After the death of his wife of cancer, Blackshaw quit the concert hall for many years and returned to play in public in 2011-2012 performing a series of concerts of the complete Sonatas by Mozart

He was appointed a Member of the Order of the British Empire (MBE) in the 2019 New Year Honours for services to music.

In 2026, Blackshaw released A Moment in Time together with PENTATONE, featuring Franz Schubert’s Four Impromptus, D. 899 and Piano Sonata No. 21 in B-flat major, D. 960, a deeply personal recording reflecting his long-standing relationship with Schubert’s late works.
