= Mia Malan =

South African journalist

Mia Malan is the founder and editor-in-chief of South Africa’s Bhekisisa Centre for Health Journalism. She is a former Knight International Journalism Fellow and a fellow at the University of Oxford’s Reuters Institute for the Study of Journalism. Malan has primarily written on health issues in Africa and media sustainability in the Global South.

== Background ==
Malan began her career at the South African Broadcasting Corporation, covering Aids and other health issues. In 2003, Malan joined Internews Network in Nairobi. She subsequently moved to the group’s Washington, D.C. office where she managed journalism training. In 2011, she joined Rhodes University as a senior journalism lecturer, teaching health and gender reporting to graduate students.

In 2013, Malan launched Bhekisisa as part of the Mail & Guardian’s health desk. In 2019, it became an independent media start-up.

== COVID-19 coverage ==
During the COVID-19 pandemic, Malan received international attention for her coverage of the pandemic in South Africa. She has also written on journalistic reporting practices in the context of the pandemic.

== Awards ==
- Health journalist of the year (2013 and 2016)
- Standard Bank Sikuvile Journalism Award (2014)
- South Africa's newspaper journalist of the year (2015)
- CNN MultiChoice African Journalist Award (2016)
- Columnist of the year (2022)
