= Heather Slade-Lipkin =

English pianist, harpsichordist and music teacher

Heather Slade-Lipkin (9 March 1947 – 16 October 2017) was an English pianist, harpsichordist and teacher.

== Biography ==
Slade-Lipkin was born into a musical family from Hoylake, Wirral. She began formal piano lessons before the age of six and made her concerto debut at the age of twelve. She studied with Gordon Green and Clifton Helliwell at the Royal Northern College of Music, and later in Paris with Kenneth Gilbert and Huguette Dreyfus.

Slade-Lipkin taught piano at the Royal Northern College of Music and the Royal Conservatoire of Scotland, and was a professor of piano at Chetham's School of Music. She won first prizes at the National Piano Competition and the National Harpsichord Competition, and was a finalist in the Paris International Fortepiano Competition. She appeared as a soloist with the City of Birmingham Symphony Orchestra and the BBC Symphony Orchestra.

Notable students include:

- Stephen Hough
- Stephen Coombs
- Leon McCawley
- Sophie Yates
- Robert Markham
- Stephen Gosling
- Phillip Moore
- Roderick Chadwick
- Jason Ridgway
- Jonathan Scott
- James Willshire
- Tim Horton
- Anna Markland
- Sarah Nicolls
- Joy-Helen Morin
- Nellie Seng
- Anna Michels
- Robert Emery
- Miles Clery-Fox
- Jane Ford
- Eleanor Meynell
- James May

Recordings by Heather Slade-Lipkin include Jean-Philippe Rameau: The Second Book of Pièces de Clavecins and Contrasts with mezzo-soprano Marilena Zlatanou.

Slade-Lipkin died on 16 October 2017, aged 70, from metastatic pancreatic cancer. She is interred at the Manchester Southern Cemetery.
