= Stockport Youth Orchestra =

The Stockport Youth Orchestra is a group of three classical music ensembles for people of up to 21 years of age from the area of Metropolitan Borough of Stockport, Greater Manchester in the United Kingdom.

It was formed in 1956, and has provided orchestral experience for many players who have gone on to achieve professional success, such as Christian Blackshaw, Jennifer Pike, and Nicholas Kenyon. The orchestra maintains a diverse repertoire and has a substantial library of orchestral music.

Outstanding soloists, often senior or ex-members of the orchestra, are invited to play concertos with SYO. Recent soloists include Emma Oldfield, William Morley, Alice Purton, George Hoult, Micha Nemtsov and Yukihiro Nishimoto.

Recent works played include Copland Appalachian Spring, Lutoslawski Little Suite, Dvorak Symphony No.6, Prokofiev Sinfonietta, Reger Variations on a theme by Mozart and Stravinsky Firebird Suite.

The orchestra was awarded a grant from Stockport Town of Culture to write a suite of songs, which form the Stockport Songbook. They songs were written by Musical Director Tim Crooks and Charlie Perry. In Spring 2024 the orchestra performed the Stockport Songbook with local primary school choirs.

Former Musical Directors include Philip MacKenzie, Derek Margerson and Xenophon Kelsey, MBE.

The orchestra funded by Stockport Metropolitan Borough Council and The Rotary Club of Stockport, and is the Youth Partner of Manchester Camerata.

It is administered by the Patrons' Society, which is a Registered Charity.
