= Stephen Coombs =

British pianist

Stephen Coombs (born 11 July 1960 in Birkenhead) is a British pianist who works with orchestras and conductors, as well as performing as a solo artist.

== Early life ==
Coombs first became prominent in music at the age of thirteen, when he won second prize in the English National Piano Competition. Coombs first studied under Joan Slade privately, then Heather Slade-Lipkin at first privately and then at the Royal Northern College of Music (under 19s section). Finally, he studied with Gordon Green at the Royal Academy of Music.

== Career ==
Coombs' career was later launched by winning the gold medal at the Liszt International Concourse; a career that continued to develop throughout the 1980s, as Coombs appeared, both in Britain and abroad, with several major orchestras and, in 1989, began recording for Hyperion. In 1992, he began recording for the label's Romantic Piano Concerto series, after which he sporadically recorded further records, all for Hyperion.

He has been Director of Music at The Conservatoire in Blackheath, London and still has an interest in music education as piano professor at both the Royal Conservatoire of Scotland and the Purcell School for Young Musicians. Coombs continues to perform all over the globe and continues to record extensively for the Hyperion Records label, specialising in Russian music.
