= Jacob Zuma rape trial =

2006 South African criminal trial

South African politician Jacob Zuma—later the President of South Africa—was charged with rape on 6 December 2005. He was prosecuted in the Johannesburg High Court between March and May 2006. On 8 May, the Court dismissed the charges, agreeing with Zuma that the sex act in question had been consensual. During the trial, Zuma admitted to having unprotected sex with his accuser, whom he knew to be HIV-positive, but memorably claimed that he took a shower afterwards to reduce his risk of contracting HIV.

== Background ==
To protect the identity of Zuma's accuser, Fezekile Ntsukela Kuzwayo, she was known to the public by the pseudonym Khwezi. Her father, Judson Kuzwayo, was, like Zuma, a member of the African National Congress (ANC) during the struggle against apartheid, and had spent a decade imprisoned alongside Zuma on Robben Island before his death in 1985. Zuma was accused of raping her at his home in Forest Town, Johannesburg on 2 November 2005. By then, Khwezi was a 31-year-old HIV/AIDS activist.

On the morning of 6 December 2005, Zuma was formally charged with rape, although the media had already reported on the allegations. He strongly denied the accusation. At that time, Zuma was ANC Deputy President and was engaged in a fierce political battle against President Thabo Mbeki, who had fired him as national deputy president in June that year. A criminal conviction would be a serious obstacle to his political ambitions – observers believed he intended to stand for the ANC presidency at the party's 52nd National Conference in 2007 and then for the national presidency in the 2009 presidential elections.

== Trial ==
The trial began on 6 March 2006 in the Johannesburg High Court. Judge Bernard Ngoepe, initially assigned to the case, recused himself due to his involvement in the ongoing (but separate) corruption charges against Zuma; Judge Willem van der Merwe presided instead. Zuma pleaded not guilty to the charge, claiming that he and Khwezi had had consensual sex.

In terms of the Criminal Procedure Act, a person who has laid a rape charge may not be questioned on their sexual history, unless special permission is granted by a judge. In this case, such permission was granted, and Khwezi was subjected to what the Guardian called "aggressive cross-examination". Zuma's defence argued that Khwezi had a history of making false rape allegations, and questioned her in detail about her childhood sexual experiences: she said that she had been raped thrice as a child in Lusaka, Zambia, where the ANC-in-exile had been based. The defence also maintained that the sex had been consensual. Testifying in Zulu, Zuma confirmed that he viewed Khwezi as "a comrade's child", and suggested that she had sent him sexual signals including by her mode of dress (she had worn a kanga, and no underwear, on the night in question). The prosecution, on several occasions, produced expert psychologist witnesses to dispute this narrative, and to argue that Khwezi's lack of physical resistance during the act had been the result of trauma.

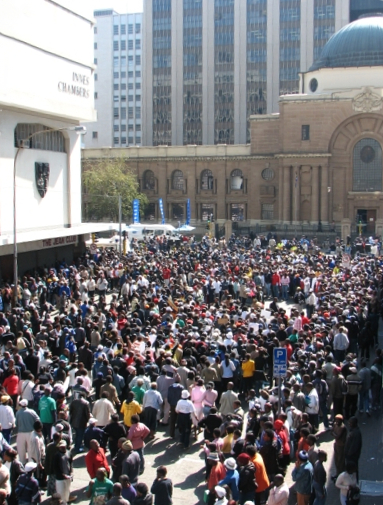
A crowd of supporters and passersby outside the Johannesburg High Court.

Another controversial element of Zuma's testimony was his admission that he had not worn a condom while having sex with Khwezi, despite knowing that she was HIV-positive and despite having been, as deputy president, the head of the National AIDS Council and Moral Regeneration Campaign. He told the court that he had taken a shower after the act, incorrectly claiming that doing so reduced the risk of HIV transmission. The popular South African comic strip Madam & Eve and well known political cartoonist Zapiro repeatedly lampooned Zuma for his testimony, and Zuma now always appears under a showerhead in Zapiro cartoons.

== Political response ==
Although there were reports that Zuma's legal difficulties were causing strife within the ANC-led Tripartite Alliance, he retained a large public support base. The ANC Women's League defended Zuma. During the trial, his supporters – sometimes in their thousands – gathered outside the courthouse, sometimes clashing with smaller groups of anti-rape protesters. They were addressed among others by Fikile Mbalula of the ANC Youth League and Buti Manamela of the South African Communist Party Youth League, and Zuma was fond of joining the crowd outside to sing "Umshini wami" with them. Zuma supporters were seen carrying posters questioning Khwezi's integrity (with such slogans as "How much did they pay you, nondindwa [bitch]?" and "Burn this bitch"), burning photos of her, and on one occasion throwing stones at a woman that they mistook for her.

== Outcome ==
On 8 May 2006, the court acquitted Zuma of rape, although Judge van der Merwe censured Zuma for having had unprotected sex with Khwezi. Part of the judgment read:

It is totally unacceptable that a man should have unprotected sex with any person other than his regular partner and definitely not with a person who to his knowledge is HIV positive. I do not even want to comment on the effect of a shower after having had unprotected sex... [However] it is clear that the probabilities show that the complainant's evidence cannot be accepted. She is a strong person well in control of herself knowing what she wants. She is definitely not that meek, mild and submissive person she was made out to be. On the evidence as a whole it is clear that the accused's version should be believed and accepted. The accused's evidence was also clear and convincing in spite of media efforts to discredit him.

== Aftermath ==
On 3 July 2007, Khwezi was granted asylum in the Netherlands, having faced intimidation in South Africa during and after the trial. She died in 2016.

In 2014, the ANC's Umkhonto we Sizwe Veterans' Association (MKMVA) and its chairman, Kebby Maphatsoe, claimed publicly that Khwezi had reported the alleged rape at the instigation of former cabinet minister Ronnie Kasrils. Kasrils sued for defamation and, in a settlement, the parties – MKMVA and Maphatsoe – agreed jointly to pay Kasrils R500,000 in damages and to publicly retract the statement.

== See also ==
- Schabir Shaik trial
- Sexual violence in South Africa
- Khwezi (book)
