= Nicholas Kenyon =

British music administrator

Kenyon's voice
recorded 2012, as part of an audio description of Postman's Park for VocalEyes

Sir Nicholas Roger Kenyon, CBE (born 23 February 1951, Cheshire), is a British music administrator, editor and writer on music.

Responsible for the BBC Proms 1996–2007, he was then appointed Managing Director of the Barbican Centre, before stepping down in September 2021 to become opera critic of The Telegraph and a Visiting Scholar in the Faculty of Music at the University of Cambridge.

== Education and career ==
Educated at St Bede's College, Manchester, Kenyon played bassoon with Stockport Youth Orchestra, before studying history at Balliol College, Oxford.

After university, he worked for the English Bach Festival, and as a freelance writer on music. From 1979 to 1982 he was a music critic for The New Yorker. He then returned to the UK as the music critic for The Times, then chief music critic of The Observer. He was music editor of The Listener and editor of the journal Early Music.

In 1992, he was appointed Controller, BBC Radio 3 and Director of the BBC Proms from the 1996 season, his title changing in 2000 to Controller BBC Proms, Live Events and Television Classical Music. In February 2007 he was announced as the new managing director of the Barbican Centre in the City of London, in succession to Sir John Tusa, a post he took up in October 2007, remaining until September 2021, when he became opera critic of The Telegraph and a Visiting Scholar at the Faculty of Music of Cambridge University.

Kenyon has been a member of the Board of Arts Council England, and previously of the Board of English National Opera, a Governor of the Guildhall School of Music and Drama, a member of the Arts and Humanities Research Council, a member of English Heritage's Blue Plaques Panel, a Trustee of the Dartington Hall Trust, a member of the Dartington International Summer School Foundation and a Patron of Spode Music Week. He is also a Fellow of the Radio Academy (FRA).

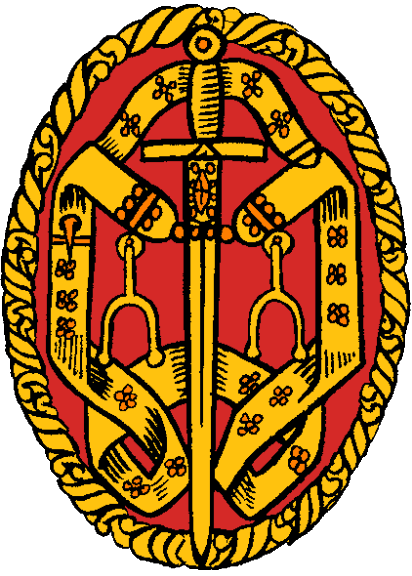
Insignia of a Knight Bachelor

== Honours ==
Appointed a Commander of the Order of the British Empire (CBE) in the 2001 New Year Honours, for services to music and millennium broadcasting, he was promoted Knight Bachelor in the 2008 New Year Honours.

Awarded the President's Medal by the British Academy in 2011, Sir Nicholas is a member of the Worshipful Company of Musicians.

== Publications ==
Amongst Kenyon's publications are The BBC Symphony Orchestra: the first 50 years (1982), the biography Simon Rattle: from Birmingham to Berlin (2001), and the Faber Pocket Guide to Mozart (2005) and Faber Pocket Guide to Bach (2011). He edited the influential Authenticity and Early Music (1987), and the BBC Proms Guides to Great Symphonies, Great Concertos, Great Choral Works and Great Orchestral works. In 2021 he published The Life of Music: New Adventures in the Western Classical Tradition (2021).

== "Rule Britannia" discussion ==
In 2020 Kenyon commented on a controversy about whether Rule, Britannia! should be sung at the Last Night of the Proms. In recent years the inclusion of the song has been criticised because of its jingoistic words, for example by Leonard Slatkin, the second non-British person to conduct the Last Night of the Proms. In 2020 the BBC proposed to perform the music in the Royal Albert Hall without the words, citing the difficulties the traditional arrangement posed during the COVID-19 pandemic. Kenyon dismissed the criticism of this decision as "kneejerk" BBC bashing. In the end, there was a u-turn and the lyrics were sung after all.
