= Pieter-Dirk Uys =

South African comedian (born 1945)

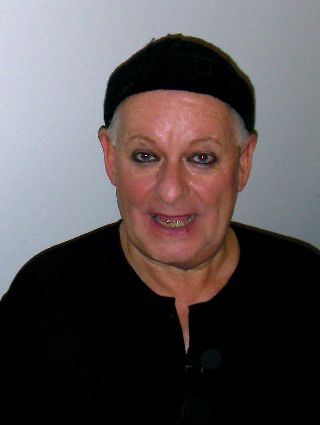
- Born: 28 September 1945 (age 81); Cape Town, South Africa
- Education: University of Cape Town
- Occupations: Satirist, performer, author, social activist

Pieter-Dirk Uys (/ˈeɪs/; born 28 September 1945) is a South African performer, author, satirist, and social activist. One of his best known roles is as Evita Bezuidenhout, an Afrikaner socialite.

== Background and early life ==
Uys was born in Cape Town on 28 September 1945, to Hannes Uys, a Calvinist Afrikaner father, and Helga Bassel, a Berlin-born Jewish mother. Hannes Uys, a fourth-generation South African of Dutch and Belgian Huguenot stock, was a musician and organist in his local church. Bassel was a German concert pianist, whom the Nazis expelled from the Reichsmusikkammer in 1935 as part of their campaign to root out Jewish artists. She later escaped to South Africa and managed to take her grand piano with her, with which she taught her daughter, Tessa Uys (b. 1948), now a concert pianist based in London. Bassel spoke little about her Jewish past to her children. It was only after her suicide that they discovered she was Jewish. Uys and his sister had an NG Kerk upbringing and their mother encouraged them to embrace Afrikaner culture.

== Career ==
Uys received a B.A. from the University of Cape Town where he began his dramatic career as an actor under the tutelage of Rosalie van der Gught, Mavis Taylor and Robert Mohr, among others. His performances at this time included roles in Little Malcolm and His Struggle Against the Eunuchs, The Fantasticks, and Once Upon a Mattress. He later went on to study at the London Film School during the early 1970s. It was in one of his student films, an advertisement for milk, that he performed in drag for the first time (as a milkmaid). He then began a period in his dramatic career as a serious playwright. Several of his plays were performed at the Space Theatre, Cape Town, and his 1979 play Paradise is Closing Down was performed in London, at the Edinburgh Festival (co-produced by William Burdett-Coutts), and later produced for Granada Television in 1981. He subsequently switched to performing one-man revues at the height of the Apartheid era. His show Adapt or Dye started at the Market Theatre in Johannesburg in 1981 and ran for 280 performances to sellout crowds. He followed this up with Farce about Uys: A Legal Assembly in Two Riotous Acts, quickly selling out tickets for its initial five-week run.

Uys is particularly well known for his character Evita Bezuidenhout (also known as Tannie Evita, Afrikaans for "Auntie Evita"), a white Afrikaner socialite and self-proclaimed political activist. The character was inspired by Australian comedian Barry Humphries's character Dame Edna Everage. Evita is the former ambassadress of Bapetikosweti – a fictitious Bantustan or black homeland located outside her home in the affluent, formerly whites-only suburbs of Johannesburg. Evita Bezuidenhout is named in honour of Eva Perón. Under Apartheid, Uys used the medium of humour and comedy to criticise and expose the absurdity of the South African government's racial policies. Much of his work was not censored, indicating a tacit approval of his views by many members of the ruling party, who were not so bold as to openly admit mistakes and criticise the policies themselves. For many years Uys lampooned the South African regime and its leaders, as well as the sometimes hypocritical attitudes of white liberals. One of his characters, a kugel (social climbing Jewish woman) once said, "There are two things wrong with South Africa: one's apartheid and the other's black people". This was later erroneously attributed to Uys himself.

Following South Africa's first non-racial elections in 1994, Uys starred in a TV series, Funigalore, in which Evita interviewed Nelson Mandela and other prominent politicians of the day. In the theatre, Uys/Evita's performances include You ANC Nothing Yet. He and his character are known for their tireless work in the frontline of HIV/AIDS activism and education. He is currently involved in teaching AIDS awareness to children and education in the use of condoms, travelling to schools all over South Africa to spread the message of safe, responsible sex. Uys also serves on the board of directors for the Desmond Tutu HIV Foundation, a non-profit organisation founded to provide treatment for and conduct research relating to HIV.

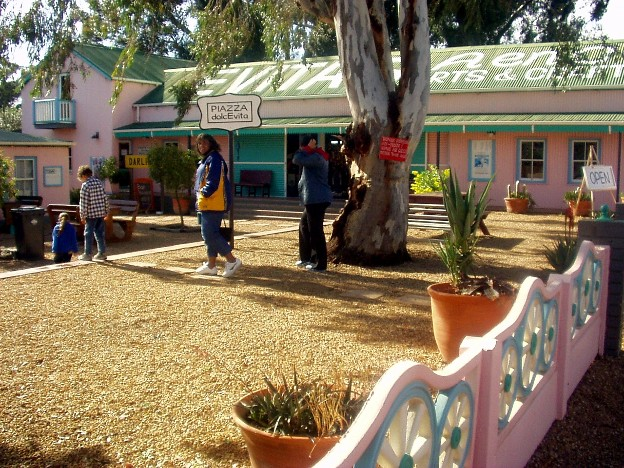
Art and Craft market at Evita se Perron

Uys converted the old, disused railway station at Darling, where he lives, into a cabaret venue called Evita se Perron (Perron is Afrikaans for station platform) and performs there regularly. During 2004, Pieter-Dirk Uys took part in a Carte Blanche story, dealing with genetics and unlocking the mysteries of race and ethnicity, entitled "So, Where Do We Come From?". Uys discovered that he has Central African heritage from his mother's side. Uys received the Special Teddy Award 2011 at the Berlin International Film Festival (Berlinale) for his commitment to AIDS education at South African schools and for his on-stage alter ego, Evita Bezuidenhout. An independent jury presents the Teddy Award to individuals for lifetime achievements for films with LGBT (gay, lesbian, bisexual, transgender) topics.

== Awards and honours ==
- The 2011 TMSA Naledi Lifetime Achiever Award
- Special Teddy Award at the Berlin International Film Festival (Berlinale) 2011
- Reconciliation Award in 2001
- Mrs Evita Bezuidenhout was awarded the Living Legacy 2000 Award in San Diego
- The lifetime achievement award from the Cape Tercentenary Foundation
- Doctor honoris causa from
  - Rhodes University: D.Litt. (Hon.), 1997
  - University of Cape Town: D.Litt. for distinguished, socially-responsible creative work in 2003
  - University of the Western Cape: D.Ed. (Hon.), 2003
- 2018 Hertzog Prize for drama

== Books ==
- Farce about Uys : A Legal Assembly in Two Riotous Acts (1983) Jonathan Ball and Ad. Donker Publishers ISBN 0-86850-077-1
- Selle ou storie: A play (1983) Ad. Donker, Johannesburg ISBN 0-86852-027-6
- Paradise Is Closing Down and Other Plays (1989) Penguin Books Ltd ISBN 0-14-048228-8
- Funigalore: Evita's Real-Life Adventures in Wonderland (1995) The Penguin Group (SA) Pty Ltd ISBN 0-14-025313-0
- The Essential Evita Bezuidenhout (1997) David Philip Publishers, Cape Town ISBN 0-86486-349-7
- A Part Hate a Part Love: The Legend of Evita Bezuidenhout (1994) Hond, Groenkloof ISBN 1-874969-08-6
- No space on Long Street; Marshrose : two plays (2000) ComPress, Cape Town ISBN 978-1-919-83310-1
- Trekking to Teema (2001) Compress, Cape Town ISBN 1-919833-10-2
- Elections & Erections: A Memoir of Fear and Fun (2003) Zebra Press, Cape Town ISBN 1-86872-665-7

== Films and documentaries ==
- Skating on thin Uys, a 1985 comedy lampooning P.W. Botha
- Going Down Gorgeous, (1998-2000) an SABC comedy about post-apartheid South Africa.
- Darling! The Pieter–Dirk Uys Story, a 2007 documentary by Julian Shaw
- How to make Rooibos Rusks with Evita Bezuidenhout, a 2016 YouTube by SuzelleDIY
