= Lindela Repatriation Centre =

Detention center for undocumented migrants in South Africa

Lindela Repatriation Centre (Holding Facility)
- Interactive map of Lindela Repatriation Centre (Holding Facility)
- Location: Krugersdorp, Gauteng, South Africa
- Status: Active
- Opened: 1996

The Lindela Repatriation Centre is a detention centre for undocumented migrants in South Africa. The Lindela Repatriation Centre (Lindela) is one of South Africa's largest facilities for the holding of undocumented migrants. These people are all awaiting determination of their legal status in South Africa (or deportation). Due to an ever increasing burden on SAPS holding cells and the lack of detention capacity in the country's prisons, the need for a repatriation centre in Gauteng was identified by the Department of Home Affairs. In 1996, Lindela was opened to meet this requirement. It claims to be compliant with all good governance and lawful criteria.

The Department of Home Affairs is legally and administratively responsible for all matters pertaining to the apprehension, holding, processing, repatriation and release of illegal aliens at the Lindela repatriation centre.

Detainees are repatriated and transported by Home Affairs, almost on a daily basis, to border posts or O. R. Tambo International Airport and Lanseria International Airport. Contact number for Deportation Agent: +27 69 102 0065

== Controversies ==
The centre has been strongly criticized for corruption overcrowding and abuse of detainees and serious concerns have been expressed about human rights violations. Popular movements like Abahlali baseMjondolo in Durban and the Anti-Privatisation Forum in Johannesburg have called for Lindela to be shut down.

In March and June 2012 there were riots at the centre. Various reports critical of abuses of human rights at the centre have been ignored.

In September 2014 following two complaints by the Medecins Sans Frontieres or Doctors without Borders, Section 27, and People Against Suffering, Oppression and Poverty; the South African Human Rights Commission released a report identifying certain healthcare and legal issues at Lindela. The South African Parliament then formed a Portfolio Committee on Home Affairs to look into the allegations and was given 3 months to report back to parliament. In October 2014, detainees stopped a hunger strike after they claimed guards attacked them using rubber bullets and batons. On 20 October 2014, the South African Minister of Home Affairs Malusi Gigaba, did an inspection along with the media of the Lindela Repatriation Centre after human rights abuse allegations surfaced in the media. The minister also invited the South African Human Rights Commission to establish an office at the centre so that Human Rights can be monitored on a daily basis. To date the SAHRC have not taken up the offer.

The ANC Women's League has shares in the centre.
