= Reconciliation Award =

Annual Award

The South African Institute for Justice and Reconciliation has given an annual Reconciliation Award to an individual, community or organization in South Africa that has contributed, in one way or another, towards reconciliation. The award has been presented from 2000-2021. Through this award the Institute would like to acknowledge and showcase the recipients' approaches and strategies to enable reconciliation, whether they originate in the spheres of politics, media, business, culture, and academia or community service. The award is presented by the Institute's patron Archbishop Emeritus Desmond Tutu.

== Criteria for nominees ==
The nomination of a person or organisation has to be based on achievements accomplished or work done in any sphere of South African society up to and including the previous year (2011). This means it can span over a longer period of time but has to include the previous year. The achievements or work of nominees must be exceptional, in that they go beyond the call of duty and are innovative. The nominee must have made a major contribution to the road concept of reconciliation and to reconciliation in the field/context in which s/he is active. The nominee should provide a living testimony to the values of democracy, inclusivity and non-violence, in public and private life. The nominee should provide living testimony to the promotion of the values enshrined in our Constitution. Nominees may come from all walks of life. This means that the person/s/organisation can be from any sector. Nominees must be based in South Africa (although they do not have to have been born here) and the reconciliation work has to relate to achievements in South Africa. This requirement has been set out service logistical aspects of the awarding process. A person or organisation cannot nominate him/her/themselves. Only one nomination per person is allowed. A completed motivation and application form needs to be submitted.

== Recipients ==
In previous years, the following recipients have received the Reconciliation award:

2021: Bhekisisa Centre for Health Journalism - 'For contributing significantly to information sharing during the COVID-19 pandemic through their news reporting.'

2012: The Socio-Economic Rights Institute - 'For keeping the Marikana victims and their families on the national agenda.'

2011: Ms Olga Macingwane - 'For her continued commitment to community reconciliation.'

2010: Insufficient applications

2009: Judge Albie Sachs - 'For realising reconciliation through his life and work.'

2008: Shine Centre - 'For helping, through volunteerism, foundation phase learners with literacy.'

2007: The community of Masiphumelele - 'For setting an example in promoting tolerance towards foreign nationals, and in striving to ensure dignity and justice for all in their community.'

2006: Ouma Grietjie Adams -'For holding the community together in mourning, conflict and celebration.'

2005: Brigalia Bam - 'For her role in enabling peaceful democratic elections'

2004: Mary Burton - 'For her work in the Black Sash and elsewhere'

2003: Dullah and Farieda Omar - 'For their contribution to the TRC process'

2002: PJ Powers and Sibongile Khumalo - 'For singing one another's songs'

2001: Pieter Dirk Uys - 'For enabling us to laugh at ourselves'

2000: Tim Modise - 'For getting the nation talking'

== See also ==
- Institute for Justice and Reconciliation
- Desmond Tutu
- Conflict resolution

== Links ==
- "IJR". ijr.org.za. Archived from the original on 2016-10-19.
