= Redi Tlhabi =

South African journalist (born 1978)

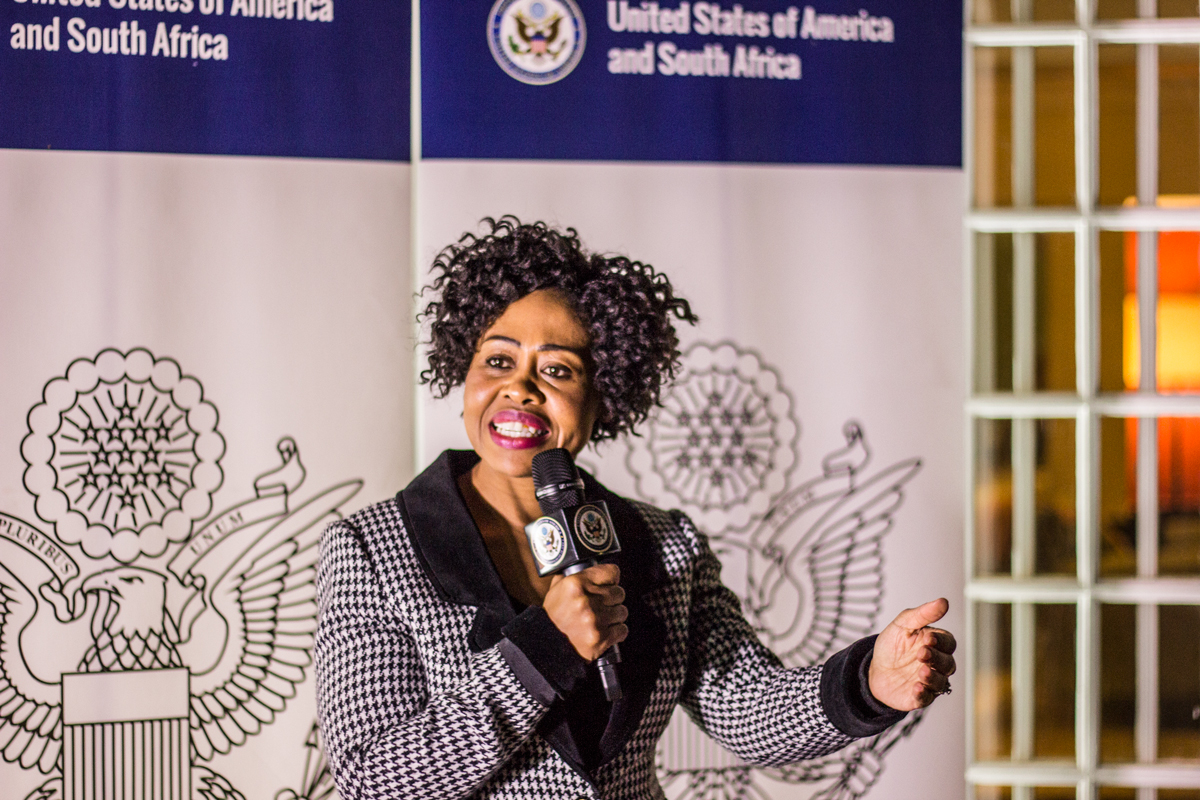
- Redi Tlhabi in 2017
- Born: Tlhabi; Birth 1978
- Citizenship: South African
- Occupations: journalist *producer; author; former radio
- Employers: [[Radio; 702]]: Kaya FM; SABC; eMedia; eNCA; SABC; eTV; Al Jazeera
- Notable work: Redi Tlhabi; Endings and Beginnings
- Awards: Alan Paton Award

Redi Tlhabi (née Direko; born 1978) is a South African journalist, producer, author and a former radio presenter. She presented The Redi Tlhabi Show on Radio 702 for over a decade. Her broadcasting career spans years spent at Kaya FM, being a newscaster for the SABC and later, eMedia Holdings owned eNews Channel Africa, eNCA. Tlhabi has an Honours degree in Political Economy and English Literature. She has been a television and radio journalist for the SABC and eTV.

== Controversy ==
In 2013, Tlhabi won the Alan Paton Award for her book, Endings and Beginnings. The book describes Tlhabi's relationship with a notorious gangster as she was growing up, after the death of her father. Tlhabi claims that she changed the names of the characters, but the mother of a gangster of the same name claims that the names are accurate but is disputing some of the facts in the book.

== Personal life ==
Tlhabi married Brian Tlhabi, a medical practitioner, in 2010. She is the mother to two daughters, Khumo and Neo, and the stepmother of comedian Lesego Tlhabi.

== Books ==
- Endings & Beginnings: A Story of Healing. Jacana Media. 2013. ISBN 978-1-4314-0461-2.
- Khwezi: The remarkable story of Fezekile Ntsukela Kuzwayo. Jonathan Ball Publishers. 2017. ISBN 978-1-8684-2727-7.

== Awards ==
- 2013 Alan Paton Award for Endings and Beginnings.
