= Richard McMahon (pianist) =

British pianist and music professor

Richard McMahon is an English pianist, music professor and was Head of the Keyboard department of the Royal Welsh College of Music and Drama in Cardiff until his retirement. He was the musical advisor and chair of the jury for the Newport International Piano Competition and his teaching life outside RWCMD has now taken on an international dimension involving him in examining, moderating and adjudicating as well as giving masterclasses throughout the UK and overseas. Richard McMahon also regularly partners the violinist James Clark, Concertmaster of the Philharmonia, giving recitals for BBC Radio 3 as well as performances throughout the UK.
