= Khwezi (book) =

2017 book by Redi Tlhabi

Khwezi – The Remarkable Story of Fezekile Ntsukela Kuzwayo
- Author: Redi Tlhabi
- Subject: Jacob Zuma, Rape in South Africa, Jacob Zuma rape trial, Politics of South Africa
- Genre: Non-fiction
- Publisher: Jonathan Ball Publishers
- Publication date: September 2017
- Publication place: South Africa
- Pages: 250
- ISBN: 978-1-86842-726-0 (Paperback)

Khwezi – The Remarkable Story Of Fezekile Ntsukela Kuzwayo (2017) is a book by Redi Tlhabi, a journalist and radio presenter from South Africa about the life of Fezekile Ntsukela Kuzwayo. South African President Jacob Zuma was tried for raping Kuzwayo, and controversially acquitted in the Johannesburg High Court in December 2005. The trial was controversial not only for the seriousness of the charge, but for statements made by Zuma during court proceedings as well as the way Kuzwayo was treated in the press and by the public.

== Background and synopsis ==
The title "Khwezi" refers to Kuzwayo's pseudonym used during and shortly after the trial to protect Kuzwayo's identity following multiple threats and insults. The book is an account of Kuzwayo's life. From her childhood in exile growing up in African National Congress (ANC) training camps during Apartheid to the events leading up to and including the Zuma rape trial and ends at the time of her death in 2016 ten years later. It also details her experiences following Zuma's acquittal and the severe public criticism she experienced. The book also raises the rarely discussed issue of rape and child rape that took place in the ANC training camps in the 1980s.

== Reception ==
The book prompted substantial public interest in South Africa following its release with audiences of over 600 people attending book launches and "radio conversations reveal[ing] a rapt public entirely consumed with the injustice done to Khwezi." The book sold out of its first print run within weeks of publication.
