= Brian Michael Moore =

American operatic tenor

- Born: Cincinnati, Ohio, U.S.
- Education: Manhattan School of Music
- Occupation: Operatic tenor
- Organizations: Oper Frankfurt
- Website: www.brianmichaelmoore.com

Brian Michael Moore is an American operatic tenor, based at the Oper Frankfurt. He has performed leading roles in the United States and Europe, including Remendado in Bizet's Carmen in Los Angeles, Mozart's Don Ottavio in Don Giovanni at the Festival dei Due Mondi in Spoleto, and Britten's Prodigal Son in Frankfurt.

== Career ==
Moore was born in Cincinnati. He studied voice at the Manhattan School of Music in New York City, completing with a master's degree. Moore took part in the operas studio of the Los Angeles Opera, completing the Domingo-Colburn-Stein Young Artist Program; he appeared there as Remendado in Bizet's Carmen, the Governor in Bernstein's Candide, Spoletta in Puccini's Tosca, and Nathanaël in Offenbach's Les Contes d'Hoffmann. He performed in 2017 as Don Ottavio in Mozart's Don Giovanni, conducted by James Conlon at the Festival dei Due Mondi in Spoleto, and as the Prince in Luke Bedford's Seven Angels at the Aspen Music Festival. He was awarded a Sara Tucker Study Grant in 2018.

He appeared at the Metropolitan Opera first in 2018 as the Song Seller in Puccini's Il tabarro, and returned the following season to perform as Gastone in Verdi's La traviata.

Moore became a member of the Oper Frankfurt in the 2021/22 season, appearing in his first season as Schmidt in Massenet's Werther, Remendado in the production of Carmen directed by Barrie Kosky, the Duke in Verdi's Rigoletto, the Vision of a Young Man in Die Frau ohne Schatten by Richard Strauss, Flute (Thisby) in Britten's A Midsummer Night's Dream staged by Brigitte Fassbaender, and Eurymachos in Dallapiccola's Ulisse. When he performed as Narraboth in Salome by Strauss, also staged by Koskie with Ambur Braid in the title role, a Canadian reviewer noted his "lively, attractive, well-balanced sound". In the following season, he performed as the Italian Tenor in Capriccio by Strauss, the Chevalier in Schreker's Der ferne Klang and leading roles in a double bill of Britten's church parables at the Bockenheimer Depot, the title role of the Younger Son in The Prodigal Son and Misael, one of the three young men in The Burning Fiery Furnace. Axel Zibulski from the FAZ noted that he has the "extreme lightness and luminous agility" ("extreme Leichtigkeit und leuchtende Wendigkeit"), that was characteristic for Britten's partner Peter Pears.
