= The Prodigal Son (Britten) =

- Opera by Benjamin Britten
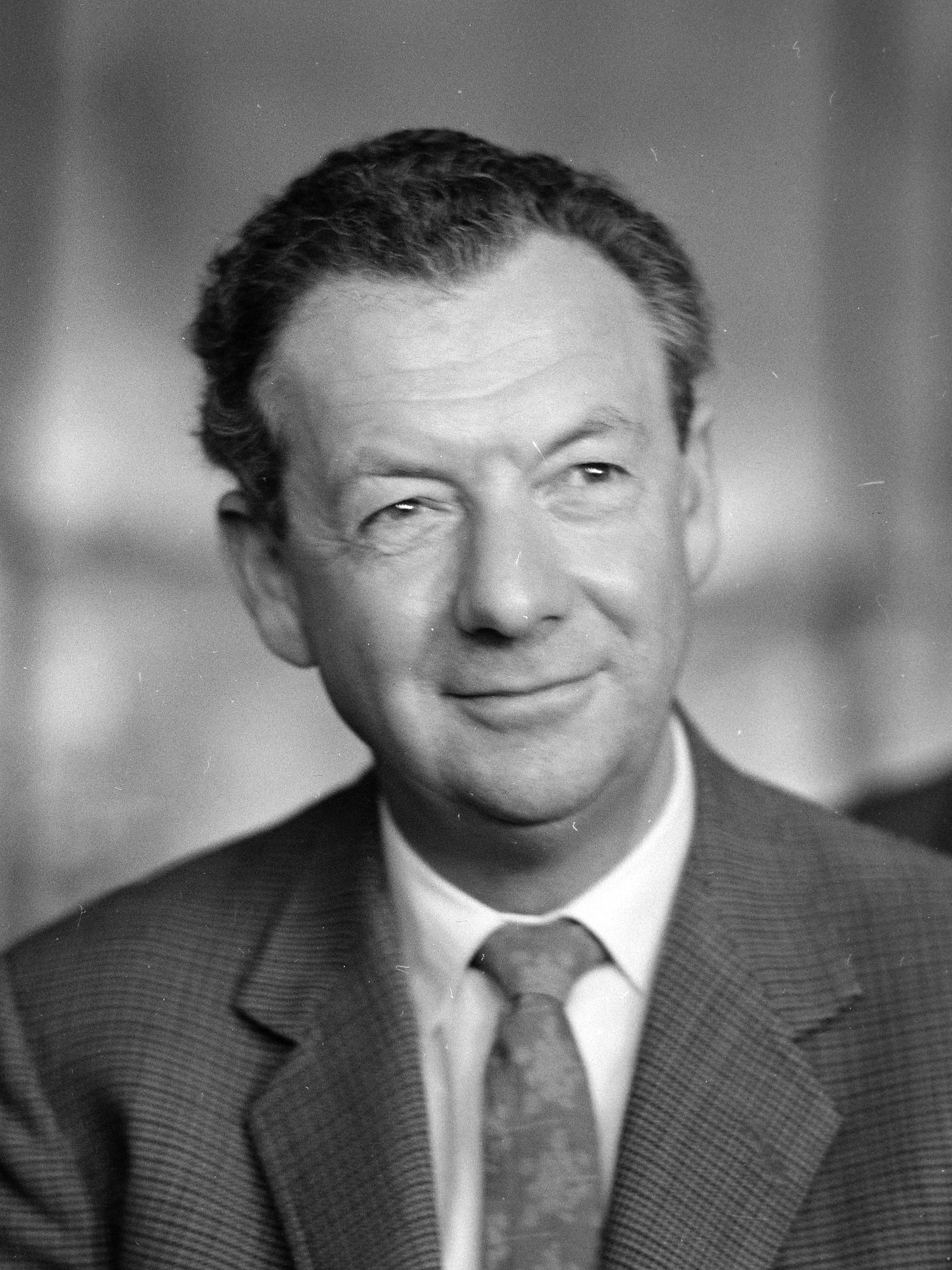
- The composer in 1965
- Description: A Parable for Church Performance
- Librettist: William Plomer
- Based on: Prodigal Son
- Premiere: 10 June 1968; Church of St Bartholomew, Orford, Suffolk

The Prodigal Son is a music drama by Benjamin Britten with a libretto by William Plomer. Based on the Biblical story of the Prodigal Son, this was Britten's third "parable for church performance", after Curlew River and The Burning Fiery Furnace. Britten dedicated the score to Dmitri Shostakovich.

The first performance took place on 10 June 1968 in St Bartholomew's Church, Orford, Suffolk. The instrumentalists included the horn player Neill Sanders and the percussionist James Blades. Colin Graham was the stage director. The United States premiere was presented at the Caramoor Summer Music Festival on 29 June 1969 with Andrea Velis as the Tempter/Abbot.

As with the other church parables, the instrumental forces are very modest: flute, horn, viola, double bass, harp, organ and percussion, with the use of the alto flute and small trumpet in D marking changes compared to the other works. The percussion also incorporates a gourd rattle.

== Roles ==
Role	Voice type	Premiere Cast, 10 June 1968 (Conductor: Benjamin Britten)
Tempter/Abbot	tenor	Peter Pears
The Father	bass baritone	John Shirley-Quirk
The Younger Son	tenor	Robert Tear
The Elder Son	baritone	Bryan Drake
Young Servants and Distant Voices		Gerald Beauchamp, Michael Butler, Jonathan Fox, Richard Hopkins, David Rookwood
Chorus: Servants, Parasites, and Beggars

== Synopsis ==
The story centers on a farm family, which consists of a father and his two sons. Servants also help with working the land. The elder son and the servants leave to work the fields for the day. The younger son hears a voice that tempts him to indulge his "most secret longings". The younger son asks his father for his inheritance, which the father grants. The younger son makes his way to the city. There, he is deprived of his fortune and left penniless. The younger son then returns home and asks his father's forgiveness. His father receives his younger son with rejoicing, but the elder son is initially angry at his father's reaction, after he himself has loyally worked the fields. The father rebukes his elder son, and asks him to be reconciled to his younger brother, who has returned to restore the family.

== Recordings ==
Britten and Viola Tunnard directed the first recording of the work, for the Decca label (original listing, Decca SET 438) with the premiere's cast and players. The full cast of singers is:

- Tempter/Abbot: Peter Pears
- The Father: John Shirley-Quirk
- The Younger Son: Robert Tear
- The Elder Son: Bryan Drake
- Chorus of Servants, Parasites and Beggars: Paschal Allen, Carl Duggan, David Hartley, Philip Hooper, Peter Leeming, John McKenzie, Clive Molloy, Paul Wade
- Young Servants and Distant Voices: Gerald Beauchamp, Michael Butler, Jonathan Fox, Richard Hopkins, David Rookwood
