= Viola Tunnard =

English pianist (1916–1974)

Viola Mary Tunnard (1916–1974) was an English pianist. She is known for her collaborations with Benjamin Britten and for being the first accompanist of the Philharmonia Chorus.

== Biography ==
Tunnard was born in 1916. Her parents were Thomas Monkton Tunnard of Birtles Hall, vicar of Over Alderley, and Grace Cook. She had two younger brothers, Thomas Tunnard and Peter Humphrey Tunnard. On her paternal side, Tunnard was the cousin of Christopher Tunnard.

During World War II, Tunnard toured with singer and comedienne Joyce Grenfell for the Entertainments National Service Association (ENSA), who provided entertainment for British armed forces personnel overseas. In 1944 and 1945 they performed in Algeria, Malta, Sicily, Italy, Iran, Iraq, India and Egypt.

In 1957, Tunnard became the first accompanist of the Philharmonia Chorus in London. She was succeeded by her duet partner Martin Penny in 1962.

During her forty-year career, Tunnard accompanied and mentored artists as repetiteur, including Janet Baker, Peter Pears and Robert Tear. She was known as "the musician's musician." Tunnard also collaborated with Benjamin Britten and on Aldeburgh Festival productions, working with Britten on works including The Burning Fiery Furnace, Curlew River and The Prodigal Son.

In the 1960s her address was 4, Upper Belgrave Street, London, SW1. Tunnard died in 1974.

Playing with Courage: A Biography of Viola Tunnard, written by Janet Anderson, was released in 2001.
