= Heterophony =

Concept in music

In music, heterophony is a type of texture characterized by the simultaneous variation of a single melodic line. Such a texture can be regarded as a kind of complex monophony in which there is only one basic melody, but realized at the same time in multiple voices, each of which plays the melody differently, either in a different rhythm or tempo, or with various embellishments and elaborations. The term was initially introduced into systematic musicology to denote a subcategory of polyphonic music, though is now regarded as a textural category in its own right.

== Characteristics ==
Heterophony is often a characteristic feature of non-Western traditional musics—for example Chinese traditional music, Ottoman classical music, Arabic classical music, Japanese Gagaku, the gamelan music of Indonesia, kulintang ensembles of the Philippines and the traditional music of Thailand. In European traditions, there are also some examples of heterophony. One such example is dissonant heterophony of Dinaric Ganga or "Ojkavica" traditions from southern Bosnia, Croatia, Serbia and Montenegro that is attributed to ancient Illyrian tradition. Another remarkably vigorous European tradition of heterophonic music exists, in the form of Outer Hebridean Gaelic psalmody.

David Morton describes the texture in Thai music:

Thai music is nonharmonic, melodic, or linear, and as is the case with all musics of this genre, its fundamental organization is horizontal...

Thai music in its horizontal complex is made up of a main melody played simultaneously with variants of it which progress in relatively slower and faster rhythmic units... Individual lines of melody and variants sound in unison or octaves only at specific structural points, and the simultaneity of different pitches does not follow the Western system of organized chord progressions. Between the structural points where the pitches coincide (unison or octaves) each individual line follows the style idiomatic for the instrument playing it. The vertical complex at any given intermediary point follows no set progression; the linear adherence to style regulates. Thus several pitches that often create a highly complex simultaneous structure may occur at any point between the structural pitches. The music "breathes" by contracting to one pitch, then expanding to a wide variety of pitches, then contracting again to another structural pitch, and so on throughout. Though these complexes of pitches between structural points may strike the Western listener as arbitrary and inconsequential, the individual lines are highly consequential and logical linearly. The pattern of pitches occurring at these structural points is the basis of the modal aspect of Thai music.

He goes on to suggest the term polyphonic stratification, rather than heterophony:

The technique of combining simultaneously one main melody and its variants is often incorrectly described as heterophony: polyphonic stratification seems a more precise description, since each of the 'layers' is not just a close approximation of the main melody, but also has distinct characteristics and a style of its own

== Examples ==
Heterophony is somewhat rare in Western Classical music prior to the twentieth century. There are examples to be found in some works of J.S. Bach:

J.S.Bach from Cantata BWV80 "Ein' feste Burg ist unser Gott", Aria for soprano with oboe obbligato

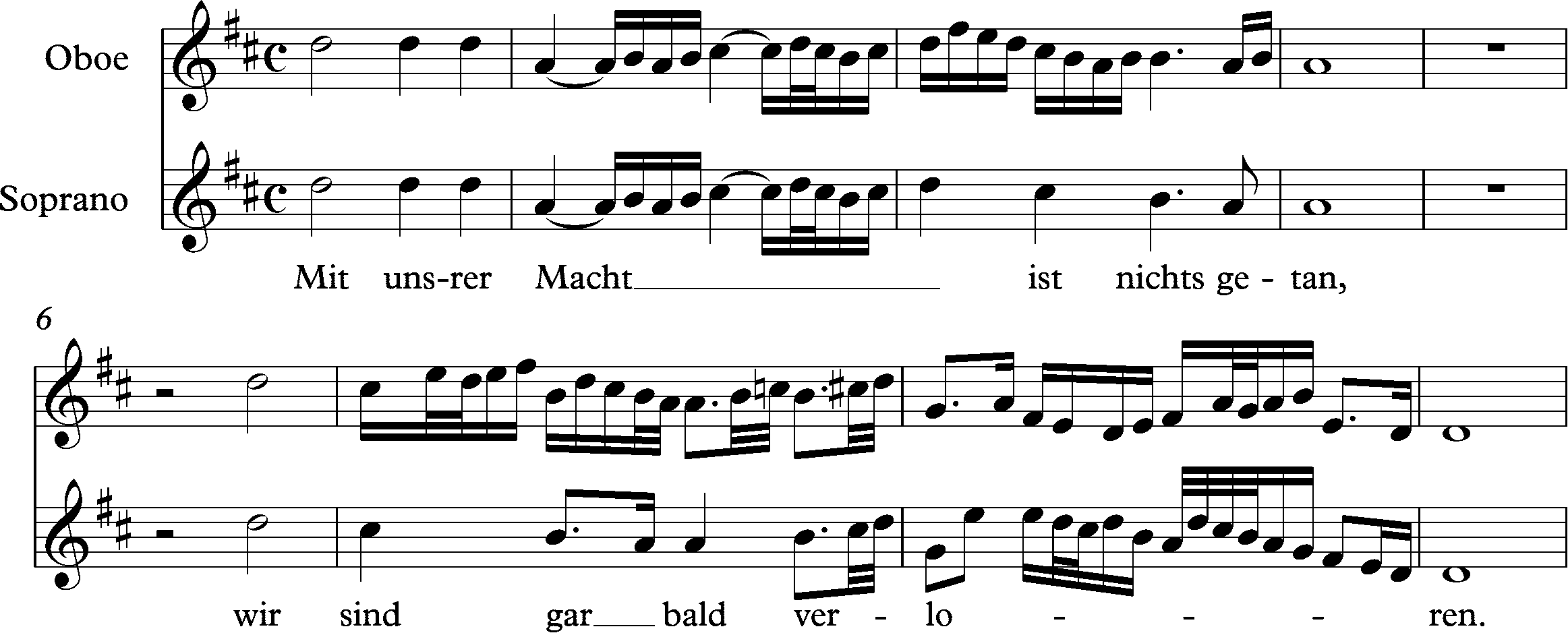
J.S. Bach from Cantata BWV 80 Ein' feste Burg ist unser Gott, Aria for soprano with oboe obbligato.

as well as Mozart:

Mozart K491 first movement, bars 211-14

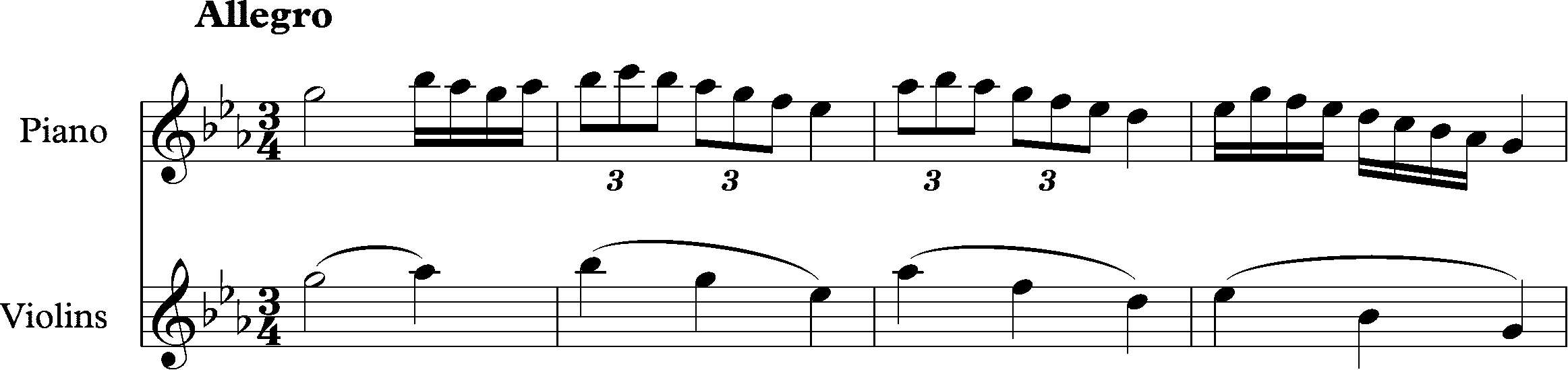
Mozart, Piano Concerto in C minor, K491, first movement, bars 211–214.

and Mahler:

Mahler, Symphony No. 4, fourth movement, bars 25-6

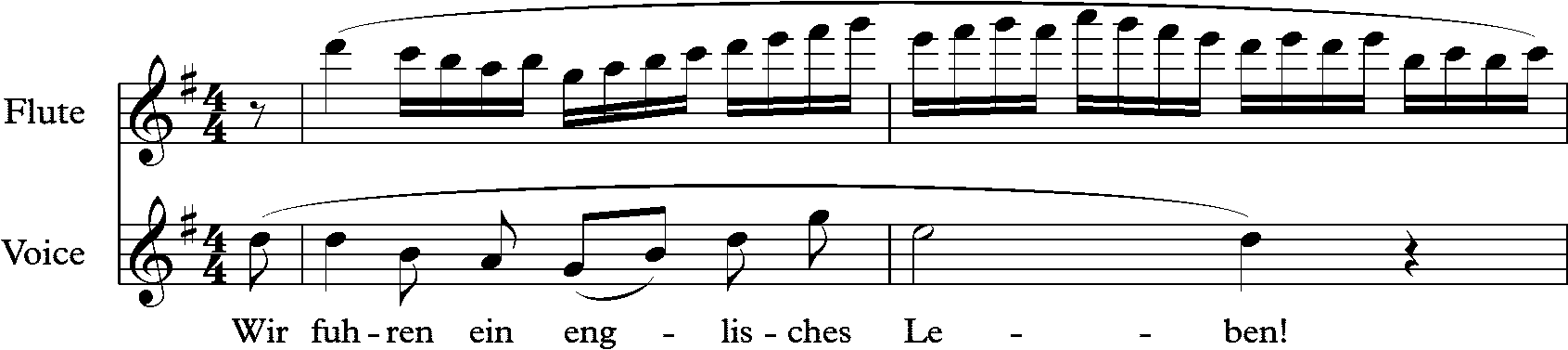
Mahler, Symphony No. 4, fourth movement, bars 25-6

In the 20th century, Benjamin Britten used heterophony to great effect in many pieces, including parts of the War Requiem and especially in the instrumental interludes of his three church parables: Curlew River, The Burning Fiery Furnace and The Prodigal Son. Peter Evans explains it as follows: "So unexpectedly stark were the sounds Britten drew from this group, and in particular so little dependent of his familiar harmonic propulsion, that listeners were ready to trace direct exotic influences in many features of the score." Other examples include Pierre Boulez's Rituel, Répons, and …explosante-fixe….

Heterophony is a key element in the music of Canadian composer Jose Evangelista.

A recent example of heterophonic techniques in contemporary music is Abril Padilla's work: *Heterophonie* for 3 Rababs and handys.
