= Christopher Plummer (disambiguation) =

Christopher Plummer (1929–2021) was a Canadian actor.

Christopher Plummer can also refer to:

- Christopher Plummer (priest) (fl. 1490s–1530s), Canon of Windsor
- Chris Plummer (born 1976), English association footballer
- Chris Plummer (film editor), New Zealand film editor
