= Robert Tear =

Welsh tenor

Robert Tear, CBE (8 March 1939 – 29 March 2011) was a Welsh tenor singer, teacher and conductor. He first became known singing in the operas of Benjamin Britten in the mid-1960s. From the 1970s until his retirement in 1999 his main operatic base was the Royal Opera House, Covent Garden; he appeared with other opera companies in the UK, mainland Europe, the US and Australia. Generally avoiding the Italian repertoire, which did not suit his voice, Tear became known in leading and character roles in German, British and Russian operas.

Tear's concert repertoire was wide, extending from music from the 17th century to contemporary works by Britten, Tippett and others. He conducted for some years from the mid-1980s, but found himself temperamentally unsuited to it. As a teacher at the Royal Academy of Music he was happier, and was well regarded by colleagues and pupils.

== Life and career ==
=== Early years ===
Tear was born in Barry, Glamorgan, the son of Thomas Tear, a railway clerk, and his wife Edith, née Dodds. As a schoolboy at Barry Boys' Grammar School he sang in a local church choir and at the age of seven he took part in the nascent Welsh National Opera's first production, Cavalleria Rusticana in Cardiff in April 1946. In 1957 he won a choral scholarship to King's College, Cambridge, where he studied English. His biographer Raymond Holden counts as his chief university influences the critic and teacher F. R. Leavis, the writer E. M. Forster and the conductor David Willcocks.

Tear graduated in 1960 and moved to London, where in 1961 he was appointed a vicar choral at St Paul's Cathedral. His choir duties left him time to study with the singing teacher Julian Kimbell and to sing with the Ambrosian Singers. In January 1961 he married Hilary Thomas; they had two daughters.

Tear made his operatic debut in 1963 as the Male Chorus in Britten's The Rape of Lucretia with the English Opera Group (EOG); the composer approved of Tear's performance, and invited him to understudy Peter Pears in the original production of Curlew River at the Aldeburgh Festival in 1964. Tear then played Peter Quint in a production of The Turn of the Screw, before joining Britten and the EOG in a four-week tour of the Soviet Union in September and October 1964. Britten wrote two roles with Tear's voice in mind: Misael in The Burning Fiery Furnace (1966) and the title role in The Prodigal Son (1968). For the EOG, Tear also created the role of Private Todd in Gordon Crosse's The Grace of Todd (1969) and sang Arbace (1969) and later the title role (1973) in Mozart's Idomeneo.

Tear was never a member of Britten's inner circle; he failed to treat the composer with the required reverence, and was seen as a threat to Pears's preeminence as leading tenor. When he chose, in 1970, to create the role of Dov in Michael Tippett's The Knot Garden for the Royal Opera rather than appearing in the premiere of Britten's Owen Wingrave, he became one of Britten's "corpses" – former colleagues from whom he completely cut off contact once they had outlived their usefulness to him or offended him. He continued to perform in Britten's operas and concert works, but never saw the composer again.

=== Peak years ===
Concurrently with his developing operatic career, Tear built up a reputation as a concert singer. In 1965 he made his debut at the Edinburgh Festival, singing Tippett's song cycle The Heart's Assurance; in the same year he made the first of fifty-four appearances at the Proms, in Haydn's Paukenmesse, conducted by Sir Malcolm Sargent. His repertoire ranged from Tudor music to the most modern works.

Tear sang with many opera companies in Britain, continental Europe, Australia and the US, but his principal base was Covent Garden. His voice was described by his obituarist in The Times as "typically British: less expansive than the Italian style and with little of the German heroic tenor in it, but pure, elegant, flexible, capable of sweetness and with a expressive quality at the service of fine musicianship and great intelligence." Italian opera did not appeal to him; his rare performances in that repertoire were Malcolm in Macbeth, Gastone in La traviata, the comic character roles of Dr Caius in Falstaff and Alcindoro in La bohème, and the one Italian role with which he became associated, the Emperor Altoum in Turandot, which he first sang at the Royal Opera House in 1984 and in which he made his final appearance there, in 2009. At Covent Garden and elsewhere he sang many leading roles, such as Captain Vere in Billy Budd, the title role in Peter Grimes, Aschenbach in Death in Venice, Lensky in Eugene Onegin, Herod in Salome, Loge in Das Rheingold, Belmonte in The Seraglio, and David in Die Meistersinger. A greater part of his operatic repertoire consisted of character roles, in which, in the view of The Times, "his humour and his sharp human perceptions were given free rein". They included Monostatos in The Magic Flute, Don Basilio in Le nozze di Figaro, Jaquino in Fidelio, Spalanzani in The Tales of Hoffmann, Valzacchi in Der Rosenkavalier, and Aegisth in Elektra.

=== Later years ===
In 1980 Tear made his debut as a conductor with the Thames Chamber Orchestra at the Queen Elizabeth Hall. Although he subsequently conducted the London Mozart Players and the Minneapolis, English Chamber, London Symphony and Philharmonia orchestras, he found that he was temperamentally unsuited to conducting, because his friendly and easy-going nature made it difficult for him to exert the authority and discipline required in conductors. He found more satisfaction in his role as a teacher; he was the first incumbent of the international chair of singing at the Royal Academy of Music, London. He held it from 1987 to 1989, and was judged a success by students and staff.

After his official retirement, Tear made a cameo appearance at the 2009 Proms as Bunthorne's solicitor in a performance of Patience, conducted by Sir Charles Mackerras, whose final Prom appearance it also was.

Tear died of bronchopneumonia, secondary to oesophageal cancer, at his home in Hammersmith, London, on 29 March 2011. A memorial service was held in September of that year at St Martin-in-the-Fields, at which readings and songs were performed by Tear's former colleagues including Dame Janet Baker, Sir Thomas Allen, John Mark Ainsley, Sir John Tomlinson and Dame Felicity Palmer.

== Honours and publications ==
In 1984 Tear was appointed CBE. He was an Honorary Fellow of the Royal Welsh College of Music and Drama and of King's College, Cambridge.

Tear published two volumes of memoirs: Tear Here (1990) and Singer Beware (1995). In a memorial tribute Robert Ponsonby commented that they were both written "in a style so odd, so metaphysical and so idiosyncratic as sometimes to defy comprehension", although Tear's "seriousness and his interest in things spiritual (he had discovered Buddhism) were self-evident – as they were in his paintings and drawings)."

== Recordings ==
Tear made more than 250 records, and wrote in his Who's Who entry that he had worked for every major recording company. Roles that he sang on disc range from Uriel in Haydn's The Creation to the painter in Berg's Lulu, and from Pitichinaccio in Offenbach's The Tales of Hoffmann to Sir Harvey in Donizetti's Anna Bolena. His many classical recordings include performances of Bach, Handel, Monteverdi, Mozart, Beethoven, Mahler, Bruckner, Stravinsky, Janáček, Wagner and Messiaen. In the English canon, he also recorded songs by Elgar, Vaughan Williams, Butterworth and Britten.

== See also ==
- Mozart: Le nozze di Figaro (Georg Solti recording)
