= Edward Wolfe (artist) =

Edward Wolfe RA (29 May 1897 – 8 July 1982) was a British artist.

He was born in Johannesburg, South African Republic. He moved to England during the First World War and studied at the Regent Street Polytechnic and, from 1916-1918, Slade School of Art.

While at The Slade, Wolfe was invited by Nina Hamnett and Roger Fry to join the latter's Omega Workshops, a design enterprise founded by members of the Bloomsbury Group and established in July 1913 with the intention of providing graphic expression to the essence of the Bloomsbury ethos. Wolfe first exhibited with the Omega Workshops in 1918.

After his first solo exhibition in Johannesburg in 1920, Wolfe showed extensively in Britain and internationally. He provided the frontispiece to the twelfth and last of the Furnival Books (1930-32), John Collier's Green Thoughts, with a foreword by Osbert Sitwell. He exhibited at the Royal Academy from 1951 to 1970. He was elected an Associate Member of the Academy in 1967 and a Member in 1972.

His work is held by the Tate Gallery, the Royal Academy, the National Portrait Gallery, London and many other public and private collections including the Dixson Galleries, State Library of New South Wales, Sydney . In the National Portrait Gallery collection is a portrait of South African/British writer and poet William Plomer seated on a chair, in oils, dated 1929. The Dixson Galleries in Sydney holds one of his work which is a portrait of Randolph Hughes, Esq. (1889–1955) painted in 1932(?).
