= Trevor Harvey (conductor) =

English conductor (1911–1989)

Trevor Harvey (1911–1989) was an English conductor.

== Biography ==
Trevor Harvey was born in 1911 in Freshwater, Isle of Wight. He was a conductor, critic, and broadcaster.

Harvey was Heberden Organ Scholar at Brasenose College, Oxford, where he studied from 1930 until 1933. While there he became friendly with other musicians such as Joseph Cooper, Basil Douglas and Humphrey Searle. From 1935 to 1942 he worked as assistant chorus master at the BBC. In 1941 he conducted the BBC Singers in John Ireland's Spring, the Sweet Spring, A Cradle Song, Variations on Cadet Rousselle, When May is in His Prime, Fain Would I Change That Note, and A New Year Carol. Ireland dedicated the 1941 choral version of The Holy Boy to Harvey.

In 1945 and 1946 Harvey was Director of Music for the British Forces Network in Germany. From 1946 he became a freelance conductor. Between 1949 and 1952 he was Associate Conductor of the Henry Wood Promenade Concerts. He conducted The New Symphony Orchestra performing Fela Sowande's African Suite for London Records in 1951. In the early 1950s he formed his own orchestra, the St. Cecilia Orchestra, which played for many BBC broadcasts in the 1950s and 1960s. From 1951 to 1973 he was the conductor of Sir Robert Mayer children's concerts. From 1960 to 1972 he was with the British Youth Symphony Orchestra.

He shared an apartment with Peter Pears and Basil Douglas in the 1930s and was responsible for some important broadcast performances of Benjamin Britten, including The Company of Heaven (1937) and The World of the Spirit (1938), both composed under suggestion of Harvey, and the first performance in England of Diversions, Op. 21 in 1950. He also premiered the violin concerto of Kenneth Leighton with Frederick Grinke as the soloist in 1953.

Harvey was also a critic and a regular contributor to Gramophone Magazine. His address at the end of the 1960s was 11 Morpeth Mansions, Westminster, just behind Westminster Cathedral. He died in 1989 in London.
