= Andrea Velis =

American operatic tenor (1932–1994)

Andrea Velis (7 June 1932 – 4 October 1994) was an American operatic tenor who had a lengthy association with the Metropolitan Opera that spanned 33 seasons. Considered a highly skilled character actor, he excelled in supporting roles, often to great comedic effect. His voice is preserved on several recordings made for Live from the Metropolitan Opera and the Metropolitan Opera radio broadcasts.

== Early life and career ==
Velis was born on 7 June 1932 in New Kensington, Pennsylvania. A Fulbright Scholarship for three years enabled him to pursue studies in opera at the Accademia Nazionale di Santa Cecilia in Rome, Italy. He made his professional opera debut in 1954 as Goro in Puccini's Madama Butterfly with the Pittsburgh Opera.

In 1957 Velis joined the roster of artists at the Lyric Opera of Chicago, making his debut with the company as the Music Master and the Lamplighter in Puccini's Manon Lescaut with Renata Tebaldi in the title role. He sang several other roles in Chicago, including Abate in Giordano's Andrea Chénier, Don Curzio in Mozart's The Marriage of Figaro, the Royal Herald in Verdi's Don Carlo, and Poisson in Cilea's Adriana Lecouvreur. In 1961 he portrayed Mime in Wagner's Das Rheingold at the Cincinnati Opera.

== Philadelphia ==
In 1958 Velis made his debut with the Philadelphia Grand Opera Company (PGOC) at the Academy of Music as Gastone di Letorières in Verdi's La traviata with Leyla Gencer as Violetta and Giuseppe Bamboschek conducting. Other roles he sang with the PGOC during his career included Dancaïre in Carmen and Goro. In 1960 he made his debut with the Philadelphia Lyric Opera Company (PLOC) as Spoletta in Tosca. Other roles he sang for the PLOC through 1969 included Beppe in Pagliacci, Edmondo in Manon Lescaut, Gastone di Letorières, Goro, and Lord Arturo Buclaw in Lucia di Lammermoor.

In 1973 Velis sang the role of Baron Kolomán Zsupán in a concert version of Emmerich Kálmán's Countess Maritza with Maralin Niska portraying the title role, the Philadelphia Orchestra, and conductor Franz Allers. He later performed the role of Dr. Blind for a concert version of Die Fledermaus with the Philadelphia Orchestra and conductor Zubin Mehta at the Mann Center for the Performing Arts in 1979. In 1988 he made his debut with the Opera Company of Philadelphia as Wagner and Nerèo in Boito's Mefistofele.

== The Met and notable premieres ==
On October 23, 1961, Velis made his debut at the Metropolitan Opera as Joe in Puccini's La fanciulla del West with Leontyne Price as Minnie, Richard Tucker as Dick Johnson, and Fausto Cleva conducting. He went on to sing more than 60 other roles at the Met over the next thirty-three years, including Alcindoro in Puccini's La bohème, Altoum in Puccini's Turandot, Don Basilio and Don Curzio in The Marriage of Figaro, the Judge in Un ballo in maschera, Andrès, Cochenille, Frantz, and Pittichinaccio in Les Contes d'Hoffmann, Monostatos in Die Zauberflöte, Squeak in Billy Budd, Trabuco in La forza del destino, and the Witch in Hansel and Gretel among many others. His final and 1,693rd performance at the Met was as Don Curzio on February 24, 1994 with Julius Rudel conducting.

Velis performed in the United States premieres of several operas at the Met, including the Scholar in Gian Carlo Menotti's The Last Savage (1964) and Apollo in Britten's Death in Venice (1974). He also appeared in the U.S. premieres of several operas by Benjamin Britten at the Caramoor Summer Music Festival, including the Madwoman in Curlew River (1966), Nebuchadnezzar in The Burning Fiery Furnace (1967), and Abbott-Tempter in The Prodigal Son (1969). In 1970 he portrayed Squeek in the U.S. stage premiere of Britten's Billy Budd at the Lyric Opera of Chicago. He also appeared in two world premieres at the Met: Mardian in the world premiere of Samuel Barber's Antony and Cleopatra for the grand opening of the Metropolitan Opera House at Lincoln Center in 1966; and the Bailiff in John Corigliano's The Ghosts of Versailles in 1991.

Velis died on 4 October 1994 in North Conway, New Hampshire.
