= St Bartholomew's Church, Orford =

Church of St Bartholomew, Orford
- Church of St Bartholomew
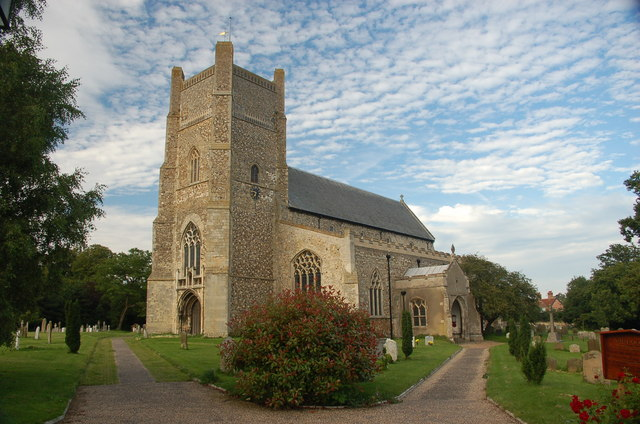
- Church of St Bartholomew

- Location in Suffolk
- 52.0951°N 1.5349°E
- Location: Orford, Suffolk
- Country: England
- Denomination: Church of England

History
- Status: Active
- Dedication: St Bartholomew

Architecture
- Functional status: Parish church
- Heritage designation: Grade I
- Designated: 16 March 1966

Administration
- Diocese: Diocese of St Edmundsbury & Ipswich
- Parish: Orford

The Church of St Bartholomew is the parish church of the town of Orford, England. A medieval church, dating from the fourteenth century, with reconstructions in the nineteenth and twentieth century, it is a Grade I listed building. In addition to its listing, the church is notable as the location for the first performances of four of the works of the composer Benjamin Britten: Noye's Fludde, Curlew River, The Burning Fiery Furnace and The Prodigal Son.

== History and description ==
The church comprises a ruined 12th century chancel, begun in about 1166 and abandoned in the 18th century, the Decorated nave and aisles, restored in the late 19th century, and the tower, restored in the late 20th century after the collapse of its upper storey in 1830. The chancel to the original church was built at about the same time as Orford Castle, and demonstrates a similar "grandeur". By the eighteenth century, the chancel was completely ruined and reconstruction concentrated on the nave and the tower. In the early 1880s George Edmund Street prepared a plan for a comprehensive restoration of the whole complex but this was not undertaken. Instead, rebuilding work spanned almost a hundred years, with J T Micklethwaite undertaking the reconstruction of the nave and aisles between 1894 and 1900, H M Cautley repairing the chancel in 1930, and Bruce George restoring the tower in 1971–72. Externally, the 12th century chancel can be identified as two rows of ruined columns extending from the east end into the churchyard.

== Interior ==
The font is 15th-century, with "four lions and four wild men" surrounding its base. Above the main altar is a painting of the Holy Family with St. John the Baptist and donor by Bernardino Luini. It was a processional banner painted to commemorate an event at Milan Cathedral in 1525. The Nativity, with the Angel appearing to the Shepherds by Raffaellino del Colle hangs over the Altar in the St. Nicholas Chapel. The church contains an impressive selection of memorials and monuments, including one to Benjamin Britten, a green slate slab set in the floor of the nave.

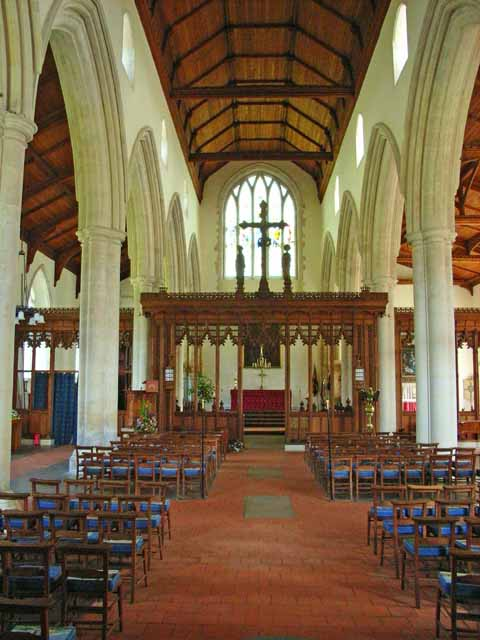
The nave

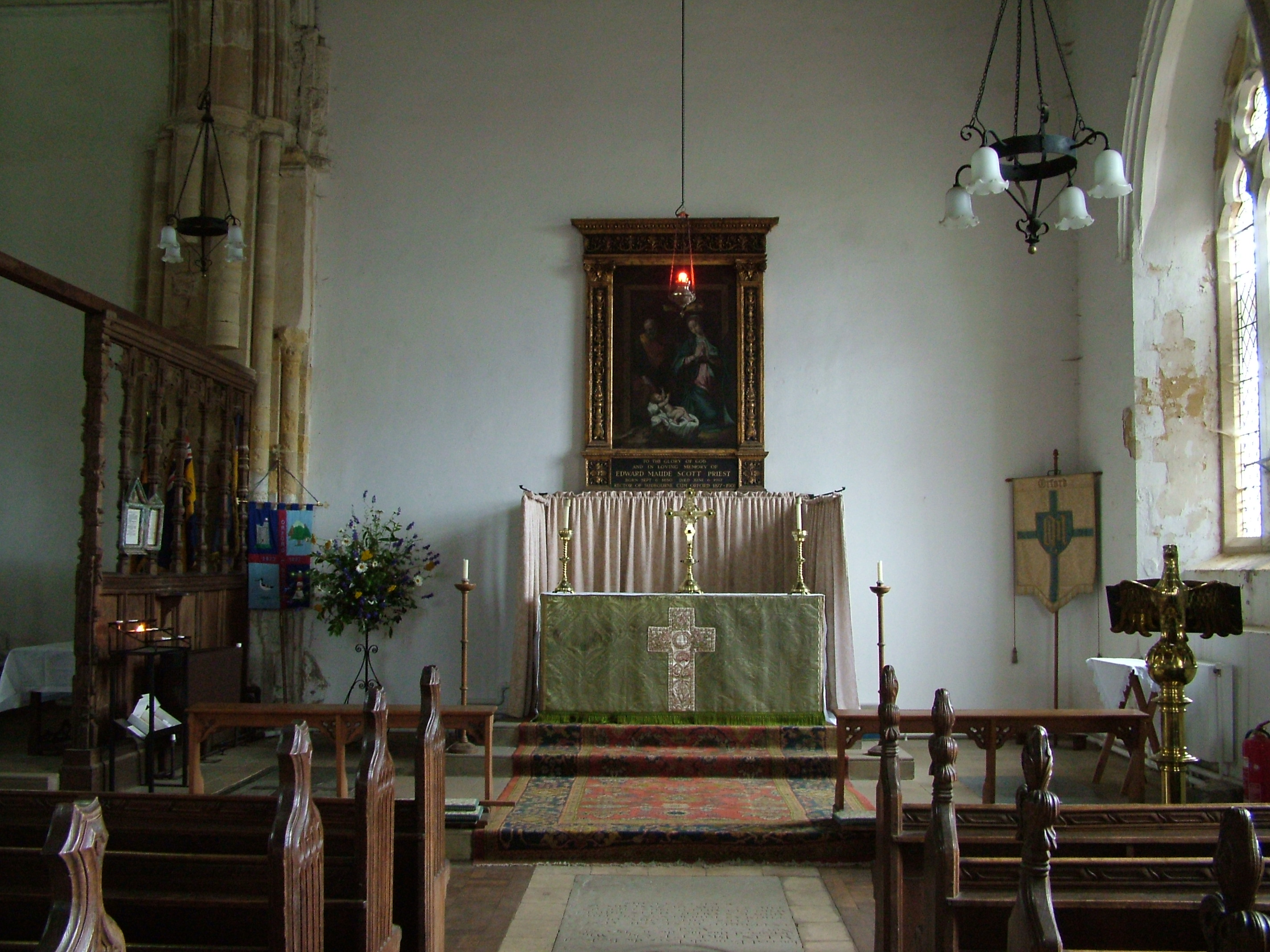
The altar

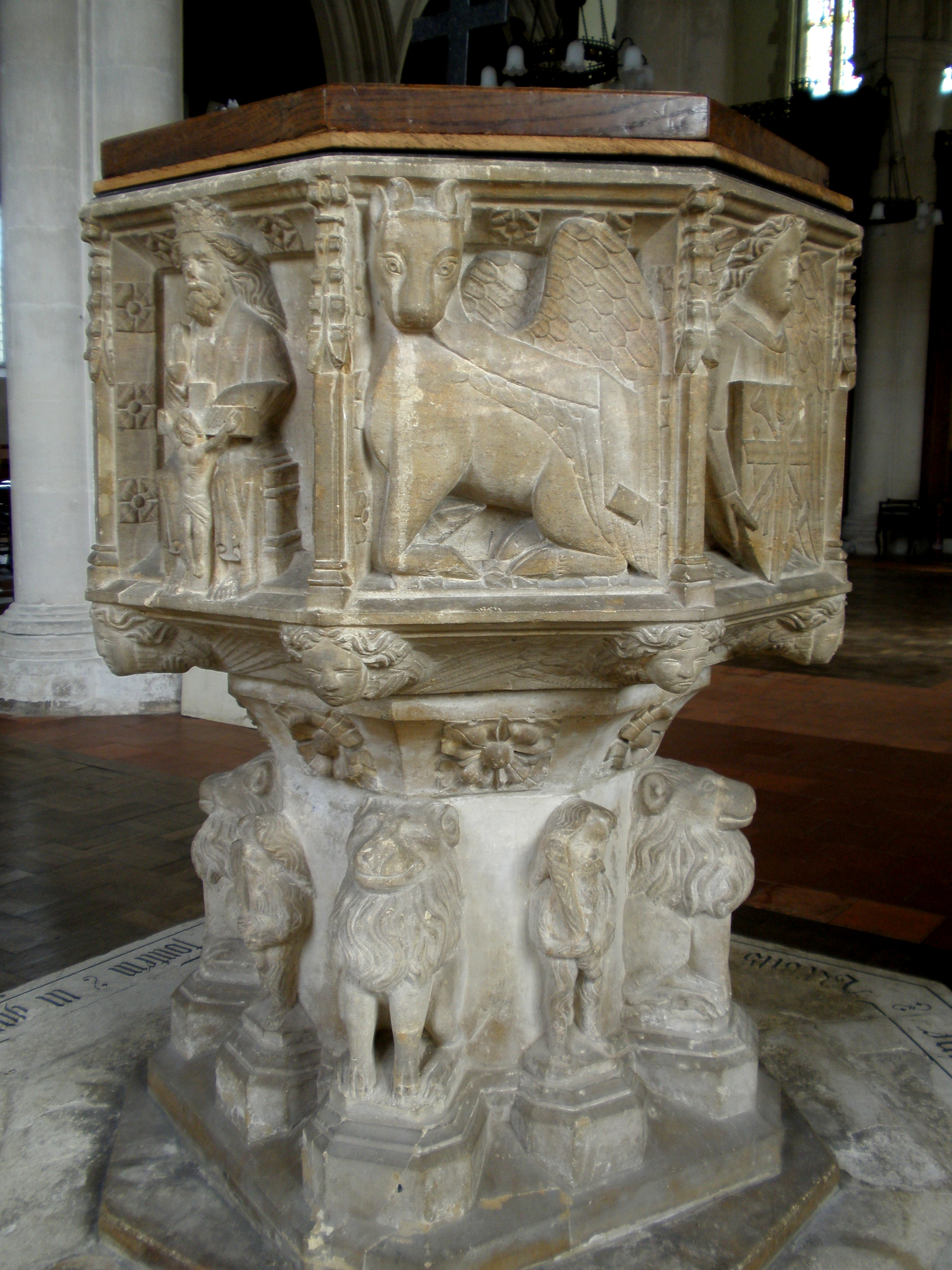
The 15th-century font depicting 'wild men'

== Organ ==
The organ was destroyed when the tower collapsed in 1830. In time, a temporary replacement was installed. That temporary organ remained in use in the early 21st century. In 2017 the church was offered the redundant insrument by Peter Collins from the Turner Sims Concert Hall as a gift. Despite opposition from the Diocesan Advisory Committee, a Faculty was issued in 2018, and the organ installed the following year by Cousans.
