= Haruko Ichikawa =

Japanese writer (1896–1943)

Haruko Ichikawa (Japanese: 市河晴子 or 市川晴子) (1896–1943) was a Japanese writer.

== Life ==
She was the wife of Sanki Ichikawa and the grand-daughter of Viscount Shibusawa. She died on 5 December 1943.

== Works ==
A new edition of some of her writings was edited by Hiromi Takatō and published by Soryusha in 2022.

=== Japanese Lady in Europe ===
Japanese Lady in Europe is a book written by Haruko Ichikawa, translated by Shigeo Inouyé (Japanese: 井上思外雄), and edited by William Plomer, which was published by Jonathan Cape in London, and E. P. Dutton in New York, in 1937. It is a translation into English of the book Obei No Sumizumi (Japanese: 欧米の隅々) (English: "Every Nook and Corner of Europe and America"), published by Kenkyūsha in 1933.

The book was reviewed by The Guardian, Time, The New York Times, The London Mercury, the Wilson Bulletin for Librarians, The New Statesman, The Tanager, Travel the Saturday Review of Literature, The Commonweal, World Review, Now & Then, The Living Age, Time and Tide, Great Britain and the East The Listener, The Spectator, Asia, The Sydney Morning Herald, The Age, and the Argus.

In 1938, Shigeo Inouyé was awarded the 7th Okakura Prize (Japanese: 岡倉賞) for his translation.

=== Japanese Lady in America ===
Japanese Lady in America is a book written by Haruko Ichikawa and first published 1938. It was published by Kenkyūsha in Tokyo. It is a translation into English of the book Beikoku No Tabi, Nihon No Tabi (Japanese: 米国の旅日本の旅).

It was reviewed by the Japan Times and the Japan Christian Quarterly.

Extracts were published, by Kenkyūsha in Tokyo, under the title American Pilgrimage, edited with notes by Arundell del Re.
