= William Plomer =

South African-British writer (1903–1973)

William Plomer

William Charles Franklyn Plomer CBE (10 December 1903 – 20 September 1973) was a South African and British novelist, poet and literary editor. He also wrote a series of librettos for Benjamin Britten. He wrote some of his poetry under the pseudonym Robert Pagan.

Born of British parents in Transvaal Colony, he moved to England in 1929 after spending a few years in Japan. Although not as well known as many of his peers, he is recognised as a modernist and his work was highly esteemed by other writers, including Virginia Woolf and Nadine Gordimer. He was homosexual, and at least one of his novels portrays a gay relationship, but whether he lived as openly gay himself is unclear.

== Early life ==
=== Parentage and South Africa ===
Plomer was born in Pietersburg, in the Transvaal Colony (now Polokwane in the Limpopo Province of South Africa) on 10 December 1903, to Charles Campbell Plomer (1870–1955) and Edythe, née Waite-Browne.

==== Edythe Plomer, née Waite-Browne ====
Edythe was a daughter of Edward Waite-Browne, of Cotgrave Place, Nottinghamshire, a "gentleman farmer" "who died young of consumption". The widowed Mrs Waite-Browne employed French and English governesses for her daughters rather than sending them to school; despite "drawing lessons, dancing lessons, and music lessons", they learned no domestic skills (William Plomer observing "I doubt if they could have boiled a kettle, still less an egg"), and any purchases were directed through their mother, meaning "they had little idea of the value of money and knew nothing about business of any kind". Whilst in South Africa, Edythe Plomer suffered health that was "indifferent from the start", falling ill and taking "some time to recover" from an operation.

==== Charles Campbell Plomer ====
Charles Plomer – "an unwanted boy" who grew up into "a nervous, unstable man, prone to sudden, unreasonable fits of rage alternating with a great need for affection shown through hugs and kisses" – was a younger son of Colonel Alfred George Plomer, of the Indian Army, later resident at Mayfair. Colonel Plomer, "although the youngest son... had inherited a considerable fortune" which he "unwisely and unluckily" attempted to increase by speculation, in one day losing around £100,000 (equivalent to over £3 million in 2024). William Plomer observed wryly in his autobiography of his grandfather's lost fortune that "the money would at any time have been convenient to his descendants." Charles Plomer (assessed by his son as "a non-thinker, with no inclination for analysis and no far-sightedness to look ahead") lived a life of varied occupations; after Sherborne School, despite wanting to go into the Army like his elder brothers, due to asthma his father placed him as an apprentice in the wool trade at Bradford, where he lodged with a clergyman. The "sociable" Charles fell in with a high-living set of "gilded youth", "sons of rich manufacturers", and ended up surpassing the limits of his allowance when playing cards and billiards. This led to his being sent to Cape Town, South Africa, his father justifying this on the grounds that the climate would benefit Charles's asthma. Having professed his intention to propose to his future wife, Edythe, he went armed with a letter of introduction to Cecil Rhodes, who recommended Charles join the Cape Mounted Rifles, a police regiment. Subsequently, he opened a cafe at Port Elizabeth and was swindled by his business partner; set up as a storeman and clerk at Queenstown before being employed as assistant to an old man there, leaving due to the jealousy of the old man's "sinister" housekeeper daughter. Looking for work at Kimberley, he was advised instead to join the Bechuanaland Border Police; he ended up participating in the Jameson Raid, but as only Jameson and his officers were to be punished Charles, one of the rank-and-file, was sent to England and set free. His military exploits earned him public admiration (including that of the dancer and actress Mabel Love) and his father's respect. Charles presented himself to Edythe's family, the Waite-Brownes, bolstered by his new heroic status; the town was "agog" at his visit, and was "with some difficulty restrained from providing a civic welcome". He was recalled to service, but soon entered the employ of a Pretoria newspaper, the "Press", where he was tasked with visiting State President of the South African Republic Paul Kruger for "snippets of political gossip". After a "decade of sunlit drifting", however, the outbreak of the Second Boer War necessitated his departure from Pretoria; he was then appointed an inspector of transport accompanying convoys ("a train of thirty wagons, each drawn by sixteen oxen") between Burgersdorp and Aliwal North, and transporting cattle from Bethlehem to Johannesburg. Aged thirty, Charles obtained his release from military service, and immediately returned to England with marriage to Edythe in mind; they were married in London in June 1901, Colonel Plomer "delighted with the marriage, having feared that Charles might take to himself some uncouth colonial girl".

==== William Plomer's upbringing ====
His father employed in the South African civil service Department of Native Affairs (per Plomer, "a civil servant goes where he is told, and naturally wants his family with him"), the family moved between England and South Africa several times during Plomer's youth, with Plomer educated mostly in the United Kingdom. Whilst in England on leave, at the outbreak of the First World War, Charles Plomer offered his linguistic skills – French and Afrikaans – to the War Office, but upon it being established that he was in the employ of the South African civil service, he was sent back there and was commissioned a Captain in the South African forces, helping with enrolment and transport of African drivers and carriers for the campaign against the Germans in East Africa. A later attempt to be sent to France resulted in failure, with Charles being assigned to remain in South Africa as records officer for a corps of Africans in service as stevedores at ports and rail-heads in France. Later, Charles, having reached the rank of Inspector of Native Affairs, left the civil service and took over a trading station in the Zululand region, subsequently becoming a recruiting agent for mine workers at Natal, which his son considered a descent in status.

=== The Plomer ancestry ===
Plomer's great-great-grandfather, Sir William Plomer (1760–1812), was Lord Mayor of London in 1781. Plomer observed in his autobiography of his family: "it is not in the least illustrious, but a bourgeois line of which the fortunes have gone up and down and which has seldom stayed long in one place." The father of his great-uncle by marriage, both men being named William Downing Bruce, published a Plomer genealogy in 1847, claiming "traditionally they derive from a noble Saxon knight, who lived in the time of King Alfred"; Plomer looked disdainfully on this claim, calling it "fiddlesticks", based on nothing more than the fact that "Bruce's son... had married my great-aunt Louisa, and he probably wished to make out that this alliance was as distinguished as it was lucrative- for Louisa was something of an heiress". Lacking interest in "mere names and dates", he much preferred characters like "Christopher Plomer, a canon of Windsor... unfrocked and clapped into the Tower in 1535 for criticizing, as well he might, the behaviour of his royal master, Henry VIII".

Plomer insisted on the pronunciation of his name as "ploomer" (to rhyme with "rumour"), although his family pronounced it in the usual way, rhyming with "Homer"; in his autobiography, Plomer addressed his rejection of the usual pronunciation, according to Christopher Heywood's A History of South African Literature (2004), this stemming from embarrassment at his father's occupation, and "hinting an ancestor's improbable job as plumier rather than plumber".

== Early work ==
He started writing his first novel, Turbott Wolfe, when he was just 21, which brought him fame (or notoriety) in the Union of South Africa upon publication in 1925, which had inter-racial love and marriage as a theme. He was co-founder, editor and major contributor of the short-lived literary magazine Voorslag ("Whiplash") with two other South African rebels, Roy Campbell and Laurens van der Post in 1926. It included material in both English and Afrikaans, and intended to publish in the Zulu language, and also attempted to portray the superior standards of European culture, while promoting a racially equal South Africa. Campbell resigned in protest against the editorial control exerted by the financial backer of the magazine. It never gained a wide readership.

== 1926: Japan ==
Plomer became a special correspondent for the Natal Witness, but after Van der Post had met and befriended two Japanese men, one being the Japanese captain of a [yacht] cargo ship (Canada Maru), Katsue Mori, he and Plomer sailed for Japan in September 1926, Plomer leaving South Africa for the last time. Plomer stayed in Japan until March 1929, completing two volumes of short stories (I speak of Africa and Paper Houses) as well as a collection of poetry. He became friends with academic, poet and author Sherard Vines. There he fell in love with a Japanese man, Morito Fukuzawa, who became the model for the title character of Sado.

== 1929: England ==
He then travelled through Korea, China, the Soviet Union, Poland, Germany, and Belgium to England and, through his friendship with his publisher Virginia Woolf and husband Leonard Woolf, entered the London literary circles. Among his friends there were Christopher Isherwood, W. H. Auden, E. M. Forster, J. R. Ackerley and Stephen Spender. It was Plomer who introduced Isherwood to Forster in 1932. The Woolfs, under their imprint the Hogarth Press, published Sado in 1931 and The Case is Altered in 1932, the latter becoming his most commercially successful novel.

In 1933 Plomer left Hogarth amicably (Selected Poems was published by Hogarth in 1940) and published The Child of Queen Victoria and Other Stories with Jonathan Cape.

He became a literary editor for Faber and Faber, and became chief reader and literary adviser to Jonathan Cape from 1937 to 1940, where he recognised the saleability of, and edited the first and many more of Ian Fleming's James Bond series. Fleming dedicated Goldfinger to Plomer.

From 1937, Plomer took part in BBC Radio broadcasts, and contributed to the Aldeburgh Festival from its start in 1948. From the late 1950s, he contributed to frequent poetry readings and events, served on the Arts Council and the board of the Society of Authors.

He is known to have used the pseudonym "Robert Pagan", notably for some of his poetry.

He was also active as a librettist, with Gloriana, Curlew River, The Burning Fiery Furnace and The Prodigal Son for Benjamin Britten.

At least one source (Alexander) says that Plomer was never openly gay during his lifetime; at most he alluded to the subject. However Southworth says that he lived relatively openly as a homosexual in Japan, and portrayed gay relationships in a number of his novels, including Sado, The Case is Altered, and The Invaders.

== Later life and death ==
He served as one of three judges with James Baldwin and Noni Jabavu, for a short story competition created by Nat Nakasa, launched in The Classic volume one, issue two (November 1968).

In later life he collaborated with artist Alan Aldridge on a book of children's verse, The Butterfly Ball and the Grasshopper's Feast.

Plomer described himself as "Anglo-African-Asian" in a 1967 article of that name, nearly 40 years after his return to England.

At the time of his death, his address was 43, Adastra Avenue in Hassocks, West Sussex; another source gives Lewes, the location of a nearby hospital, as place of death. He died on 20 September 1973 aged 69 in the arms of his partner of almost thirty years, Charles Erdmann. The date given by Encyclopaedia Britannica and in the London Gazette is incorrect.

== Recognition, legacy ==
In 1951 Plomer was elected a fellow of the Royal Society of Literature.

He was awarded an honorary D.Litt. by the University of Durham in 1959.

In 1966 he chaired the panel of judges for the Cholmondeley Award.

He won the Queen's Gold Medal for Poetry in 1963.

He was publicly tipped for the Poet Laureateship in 1967 and 1972.

He was awarded a CBE in 1968.

In 1958 he was elected president of the Poetry Society.

In 1976, the inaugural Mofolo-Plomer Prize, created by Nadine Gordimer and so named in honour of Basotho writer Thomas Mofolo and Plomer, was awarded to Mbulelo Mzamane. The judges for that year were Chinua Achebe, Alan Paton and Adam Small. Since then, Achmat Dangor, J. M. Coetzee, Njabulo Simakahle Ndebele, Rose Zwi and Peter Wilhelm have been other recipients of the prize.

Nadine Gordimer, in her introduction to a new edition of Turbott Wolfe in 2003, said that the novel deserved recognition as being in the "canon of renegade colonialist literature along with Conrad", and others have noted its experimental narrative structure, which puts it (along with some of his other work) in the category of a modernist novel.

His last work, the collection of children's poems entitled The Butterfly Ball and the Grasshopper's Feast, won the 1973 Whitbread Award.

Durham University has an extensive collection of Plomer's literary papers and correspondence, as well as his library of printed books, and lists a full bibliography on its website.

A portrait of Plomer seated on a chair, in oils, dated 1929, by Edward Wolfe, and several photographs of Plomer, by Howard Coster and others are held by the National Portrait Gallery in London.

== Works ==
- 1925. Turbott Wolfe (novel)
- 1927. Notes for Poems. Hogarth Press, London (poetry)
- 1927. I Speak of Africa (short stories)
- 1929. The Family Tree. Hogarth, London (poetry)
- 1929. Paper Houses. Hogarth, London (short stories)
- 1931. Sado. Hogarth, London (novel)
- 1932. The Case is Altered (novel)
- 1932. The Fivefold Screen (poetry)
- 1933. The Child of Queen Victoria (short stories)
- 1933. Cecil Rhodes (biography)
- 1934. The Invaders (novel)
- 1936. Visiting the Caves. Cape, London (poetry)
- 1936. Ali the Lion (biography, reissued in 1970 as The Diamond of Jannina: Ali Pasha, 1741-1822)
- 1937. William Plomer (editor): Haruko Ichikawa: A Japanese Lady in Europe. Cape, London
- 1938. Selections from the Diary of the Rev. Francis Kilvert (1870–1879)
- 1940. Selected Poems. Hogarth, London
- 1942. In a Bombed House, 1941: Elegy in Memory of Anthony Butts (poetry)
- 1943. Double Lives: An Autobiography. Cape, London.
- 1945. Curious Relations. Cape, London. under pseudonym William D'Arfey. Collaboration with Anthony Butts (memoirs of Butts's family)
- 1945. The Dorking Thigh and Other Satires (poetry)
- 1949. Four Countries. Cape, London (short stories)
- 1952. Museum Pieces (novel)
- 1955. A Shot in the Park (poetry, published in U.S. as Borderline Ballads)
- 1958. At Home: Memoirs. Cape, London.
- 1960. Collected Poems. Cape, London.
- 1960. A Choice of Ballads (poetry)
- 1966. Taste and Remember (poetry)
- 1970. Celebrations (poetry)
- 1973. Collected Poems. Cape, London (expanded edition)
- 1973. "Butterfly Ball" Cape, London (Co author with Alan Aldridge)
- 1975. The Autobiography of William Plomer. Cape, London (revision of Double Lives, he died before he could rework At Home)
- 1978. Electric Delights. Selected and introduced by Rupert Hart-Davis. Cape, London (previously uncollected pieces, including the essay "On Not Answering the Telephone")

== Plomer's last poem Painted on Darkness ==
A sunlit branch of four reflected roses
Bright on the darkened window of that room,
That locked and shuttered, memory-haunted room,
Startles by tint and stillness, perfectly composed.
Each rose transmuted, sweeter than itself,
In pure vermilion stands out strange and new
Against the haunted glass intensified,
Painted on darkness, as a poem is.
