= Basil Douglas =

Scottish music agent (1914–1992)

Basil Douglas (1914 – 25 October 1992) was a Scottish music administrator and agent.

== Biography ==
Basil Douglas was born in 1914. At first his dream was to become a professional singer but health issues prevented this goal.

From 1935 to 1938 he shared a flat with Peter Pears and Trevor Harvey at 105 Charlotte Street, London. From 1936 to 1951 Douglas was a member of the BBC music staff and originated the popular series Music in Miniature.

From 1951 to 1957, Basil Douglas was the General Manager of the English Opera Group. He was invited to take the position by Benjamin Britten. Later Douglas founded an artists' agency.

In 1998 Maureen Garnham published As I saw it : Basil Douglas, Benjamin Britten and the English Opera Group 1955-1957.
