= Diversions for Piano Left Hand and Orchestra =

Composition by Benjamin Britten

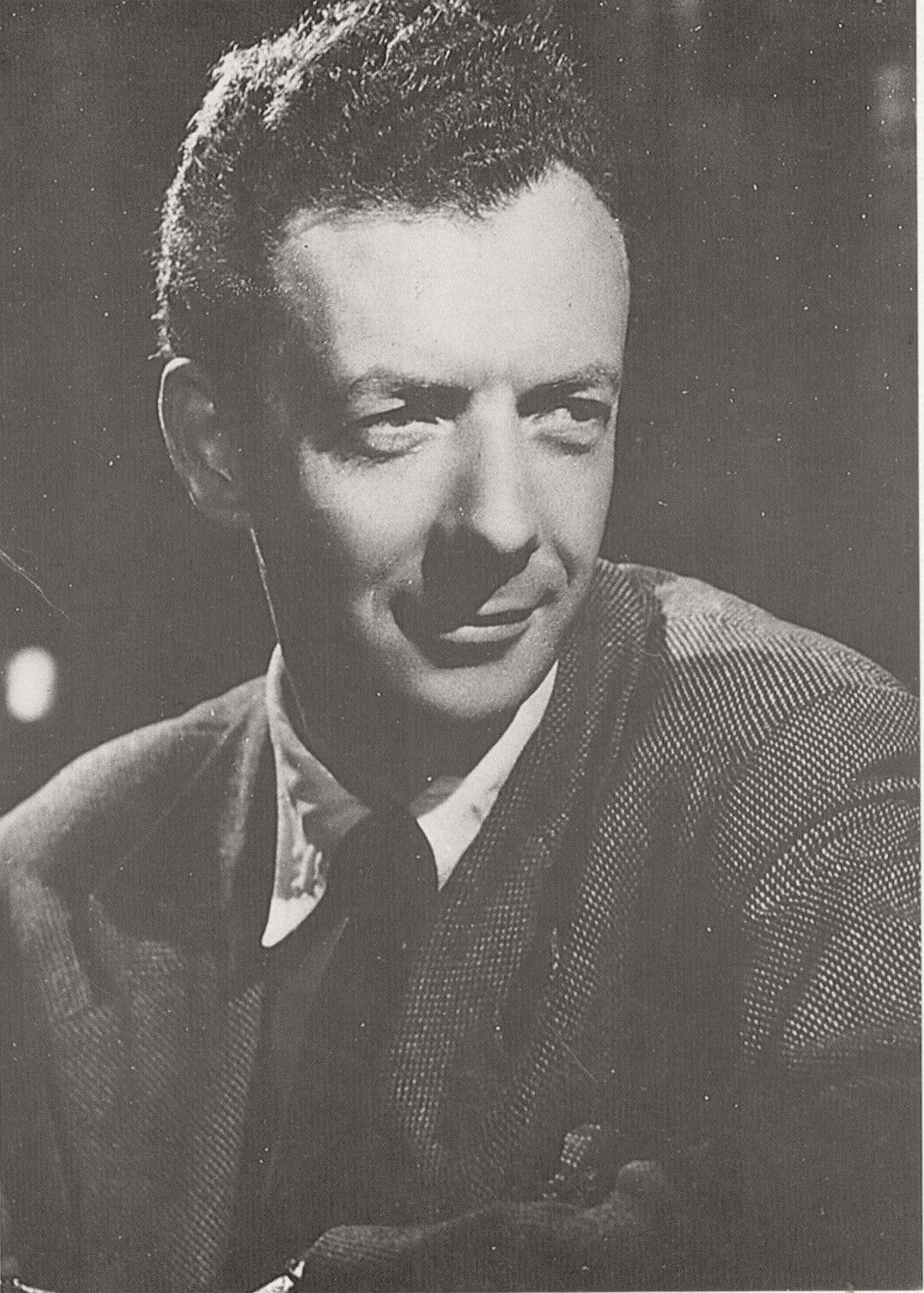
Benjamin Britten in the 1940s

Diversions for Piano Left Hand and Orchestra, Op. 21, is a concertante music composition by Benjamin Britten.

== History ==
Britten wrote the work for Paul Wittgenstein, the Viennese-born pianist who lost his right arm in World War I. Britten met Wittgenstein in New York in July 1940 and sketched the piece in August at Owl's Head, Maine. Although Wittgenstein complained about the orchestration, Britten initially declined to make any changes but later agreed to a few small alterations. Forever after, he felt bitter about them, and after 1950 he revised the score "to create an official version that would stop Paul playing it by rendering his version obsolete." Wittgenstein retained the performing rights for a good number of years, which kept other pianists from performing the work.

Wittgenstein played the premiere of Diversions with the Philadelphia Orchestra under the baton of Eugene Ormandy on 16 January 1942. The Philadelphia reviewers commented more on Wittgenstein and his work as a one-armed pianist than on the composition itself. The Philadelphia Record did describe the score as "ingeniously written", while Musical America commented on the presence of both "pleasurable and dull moments" in the work.

Wittgenstein gave the British premiere of the revised work in October 1950, with the (then) Bournemouth Municipal Orchestra under Trevor Harvey. Britten then made further revisions and in 1954 made his own first recording, conducting the London Symphony Orchestra with soloist Julius Katchen.

== Music ==
The piece is in the form of a theme and 11 variations:

- Theme
- Variation I, Recitative
- Variation II, Romance
- Variation III, March
- Variation IV, Rubato
- Variation V, Chorale
- Variation VI, Nocturne
- Variation VII, Badinerie
- Variation VIII, Ritmico
- Variation IXa, Toccata I
- Variation IXb, Toccata II
- Variation X, Adagio
- Variation XI, Tarantella.

Britten utilised music that he wrote for a production of J. B. Priestley's Johnson over Jordan as source material for the work. Lyn Henderson has noted the influence of Prokofiev-like rhythms in Variation IXa. Christopher Mark has discussed Britten's use of the circle of fifths in various works, including the Diversions.

== Recordings ==
- Decca LXT 2981 (original LP): Julius Katchen, pianist; London Symphony Orchestra; Benjamin Britten, conductor
- Desto Records DC-7168 (original LP): Leon Fleisher, pianist; Baltimore Symphony Orchestra; Sergiu Comissiona, conductor
- Sony Classical SK 48188 (1992 CD): Leon Fleisher, pianist; Boston Symphony Orchestra; Seiji Ozawa, conductor
- EMI Classics: Peter Donohoe, pianist; City of Birmingham Symphony Orchestra; Sir Simon Rattle, conductor

== See also ==
- List of works for piano left-hand and orchestra
