= The Burning Fiery Furnace =

- Opera by Benjamin Britten
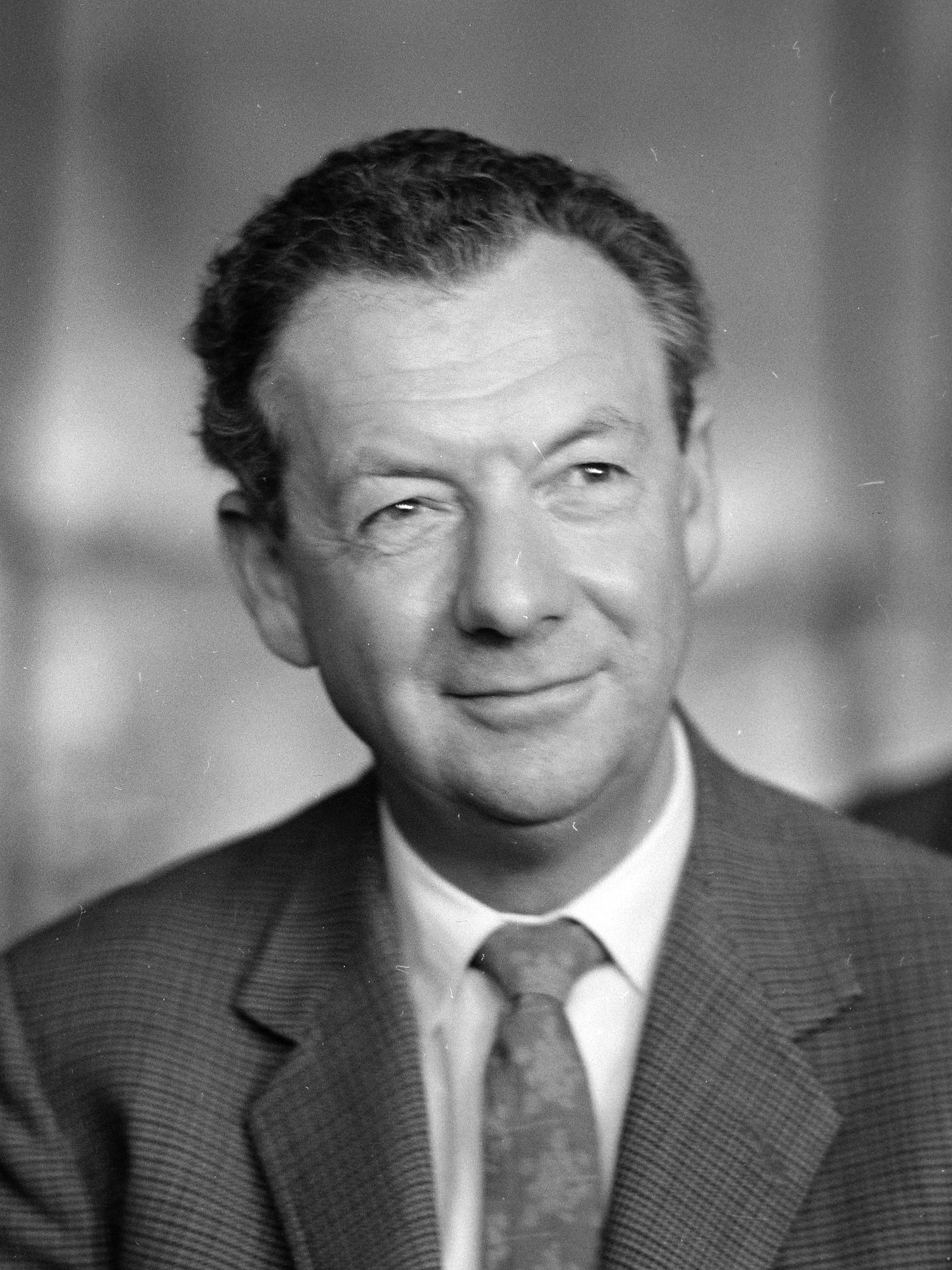
- The composer in 1965
- Description: A Parable for Church Performance
- Librettist: William Plomer
- Premiere: 9 June 1966; Church of St Bartholomew, Orford, Suffolk

The Burning Fiery Furnace is an English music drama with music composed by Benjamin Britten, his Opus 77, to a libretto by William Plomer. One of Britten's three Parables for Church Performances, this work received its premiere at the St Bartholomew's Church, Orford, Suffolk, England, on 9 June 1966 by the English Opera Group.

Colin Graham was the stage director of this first production. Set designs were by Annena Stubbs. The United States premiere was presented at the Caramoor Summer Music Festival on 25 June 1967 with Andrea Velis as Nebuchadnezzar.

The scale and manner of instrumentation are similar to those in Curlew River, but one notable difference is the use of the alto trombone.

Clifford Hindley has commented on a reading of a subtext sympathetic to homosexuality on the part of both Britten and Plomer in their treatment of the story.

== Roles ==
Role	Voice type	Premiere Cast, 9 June 1966 (Conductor: Benjamin Britten)
Nebuchadnezzar	tenor	Peter Pears
Astrologer	baritone	Bryan Drake
Ananias (Shadrack)	baritone	John Shirley-Quirk
Misael (Meshach)	tenor	Robert Tear
Azarias (Abednego)	baritone	Victor Godfrey
Herald and Leader of the Courtiers	baritone	Peter Leeming
Chorus of Courtiers; attendants

== Synopsis ==
The Burning Fiery Furnace tells the story of Nebuchadnezzar (the historical Nebuchadnezzar II) and the three Israelites, Ananias, Misael and Asarias (corresponding Babylonian names: Shadrach, Meshach and Abednego), who were thrown into a furnace for their refusal to worship Nebuchadnezzar's image of gold. However, God saves them from death, as the voice of an angel joins the Israelites in a 'Benedicite'.

== Original recording ==
Britten himself, along with Viola Tunnard, supervised the first commercial recording of this work, for Decca/London, with the following participants:

- Nebuchadnezzar: Peter Pears
- The Astrologer: Bryan Drake
- Ananias (Shadrach): John Shirley-Quirk
- Misael (Meshach): Robert Tear
- Asarias (Abednego): Stafford Dean
- The Herald: Peter Leeming
- Chorus of Courtiers: Graham Allum, Peter Bedford, Carl Duggan, David Hartley, John McKenzie, Clive Molloy, Malcolm Rivers
- The Acolytes: Robert Alder, Paull Boucher, James Newby, Stephen Price, Christopher Taylor

The instrumentalists were Richard Adeney (flute), Neill Sanders (horn), Roger Brenner (trombone), Cecil Aronowitz (viola), Keith Marjoram (double bass), Osian Ellis (harp), James Blades (percussion) and Philip Ledger (organ).

- Conductor: Benjamin Britten
