= Christopher Plummer (priest) =

English priest (fl. 1490s – 1530s)

Christopher Plummer (fl. 1490s – 1530s) was a Canon of Windsor from 1513 to 1535. He was attainted and deprived in 1535.

The writer William Plomer claimed relationship with Plummer, referring to him as ""Christopher Plomer, a canon of Windsor... unfrocked and clapped into the Tower in 1535 for criticizing, as well he might, the behaviour of his royal master, Henry VIII".

== Career ==
He was appointed:

- Prebendary of Auckland in Durham 1493
- Prebendary of Bole in York Minster 1507
- Prebendary of Cadington Major in St Paul’s 1515
- Prebendary of Welton Beckhall in Lincoln 1533 - 1534
- Prebendary of Somerley in Chichester 1516 - 1534

He was appointed to the fourth stall in St George's Chapel, Windsor Castle in 1513. For opposing the king's divorce he was attainted and imprisoned in the Tower in 1534, but was pardoned two years later.
