= Curlew River =

1964 English music drama by Benjamin Britten

- Opera by Benjamin Britten
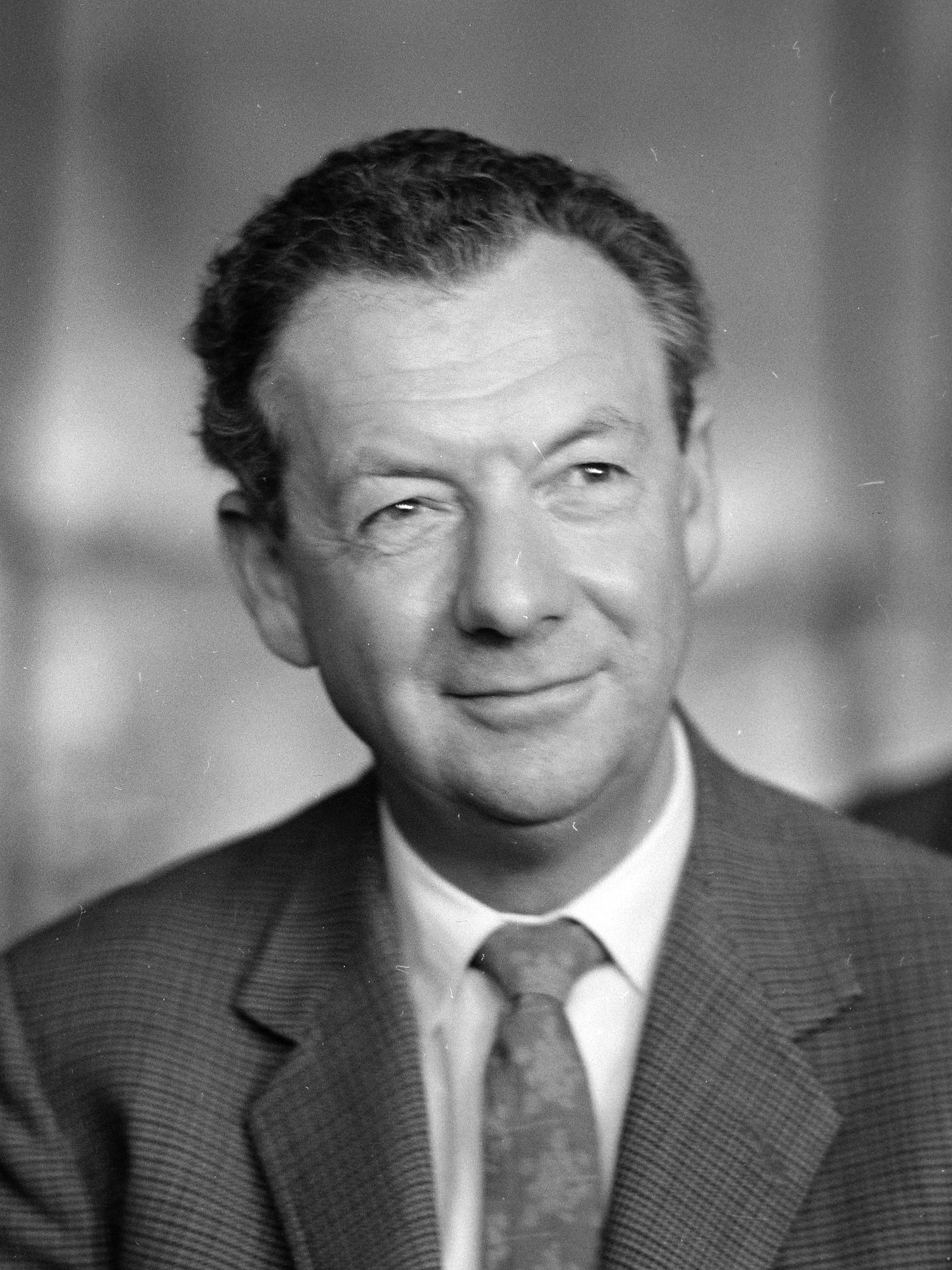
- The composer in 1965
- Description: A Parable for Church Performance
- Librettist: William Plomer
- Based on: Sumidagawa by Juro Motomasa (ja:隅田川 (能))
- Premiere: 13 June 1964; Church of St Bartholomew, Orford, Suffolk

Curlew River – A Parable for Church Performance (Op. 71) is an English music drama, with music by Benjamin Britten to a libretto by William Plomer. The first of Britten's three 'Parables for Church Performance', the work is based on the Japanese noh play Sumidagawa (Sumida River) by Kanze Jūrō (1395–1431), which Britten saw during a visit to Japan and East Asia in early 1956. Beyond the noh source dramatic material, Britten incorporated elements of noh treatment of theatrical time into this composition. Curlew River marked a departure in style for the remainder of the composer's creative life, paving the way for such works as Owen Wingrave, Death in Venice and the Third String Quartet.

Plomer translated the setting of the original into a Christian parable, set in early medieval times near the fictional Curlew River, in the fenlands of East Anglia. Peter F. Alexander has investigated in detail the librettist's contribution to the work, through study of the letters between Plomer and Britten. Mikiko Ishi has done a comparative study of the 'weeping mother' figures in Sumidagawa, Curlew River, and various religious plays from medieval Europe. Daniel Albright has examined Britten's and Plomer's adaptations of aspects of the Sumidagawa original into the context of their own cultural and religious backgrounds in the creation of Curlew River.

Under Colin Graham's direction, the work was premiered on 13 June 1964 at St Bartholomew's Church, Orford, Suffolk, England, by the English Opera Group. The original cast included Britten regulars Peter Pears and Bryan Drake. The United States premiere was presented at the Caramoor Summer Music Festival on 26 June 1966, with Andrea Velis as the Madwoman.

== Roles ==
Role	Voice type	Premiere Cast, 13 June 1964 (Conductor: Benjamin Britten)
Madwoman	tenor	Peter Pears
Ferryman	baritone	John Shirley-Quirk
Traveller	baritone	Bryan Drake
Spirit of the boy	treble	Robert Carr, Bruce Webb
Abbot	bass	Don Garrard
Three assistants (acolytes); Chorus of eight Pilgrims (three tenors, three baritones and two basses).

== Synopsis ==
The story is told through four main characters: the Abbot (who acts as a narrator), the Madwoman, the Ferryman, and the Traveller, performed by monks. The all male cast is in the style of Noh theatre and suits the Anglicisation of the opera as a mystery play performed by monks. A chorus is provided by eight Pilgrims.

Curlew River opens, as do the other two Church Parables, with a processional, to the hymn Te lucis ante terminum (To Thee before the close of day), in which monks/performers plus musicians, process in and take their places. At a cue from the organ, the Abbot, who acts as a narrator, introduces the "mystery" to be presented. The monks who depict the principal players don their costumes to stately instrumental accompaniment after which the play commences.

The Ferryman sings of a commemoration that will be held that day at a shrine across the river. A Traveller approaches, wishing to cross the Curlew River. The Ferryman delays his departure and then they hear the cries of the approaching Madwoman. She is deranged out of grief for her son, who inexplicably disappeared a year ago. The Ferryman is initially reluctant to carry the Madwoman, but the other characters take pity on her and persuade him to give her passage. As they cross the river, the Ferryman tells the story of the shrine: it is the burial place of a boy who arrived the year before with a cruel master who had kidnapped him from his home near the Black Mountains. The boy was sick, and his master abandoned him by the river. Despite being cared for by the locals, the boy died. The Ferryman recounts the boy's words:

I know I am dying... Please bury me here, by the path to this chapel. Then, if travellers from my dear country pass this way, their shadows will fall on my grave, and plant a yew tree in memory of me.

The river people believe that the boy's grave is sacred, that:

...some special grace is there, to heal the sick in body and in soul

As the Ferryman tells his story, it becomes clear that the boy he describes is the disappeared child of the Madwoman. Grief-stricken, she joins the rest of the cast in praying at the boy's graveside. At the climactic moment when all the men are chanting together, the voice of the boy (a treble) is heard echoing them, and his spirit appears above the tomb to reassure his mother:

Go your way in peace, mother. The dead shall rise again, And in that blessed day, We shall meet in heav'n

At this point, the Madwoman achieves reconcilliation and her madness lifts. Britten depicts the moment with the Madwoman letting out a joyful, melismatic "Amen", the final note of which resolves onto a long-delayed unison with the full cast – a signal of return and acceptance.

Here the robing ceremony music returns and the players shed their costumes to resume normal dress. The Abbot spells out the moral of the drama and bids the audience farewell. The cast recess to the same plainsong with which the work began.

== Music ==
At the premiere performance the instrumentalists included flutist Richard Adeney, horn player Neill Sanders, violist Cecil Aronowitz, double bass player Stuart Knussen, harpist Osian Ellis, organist Philip Ledger and percussionist James Blades.

The singers are accompanied by a small group of instrumentalists, dressed as lay brothers. The work is scored for:

- Flute (doubling piccolo)
- Horn
- Viola
- Double Bass
- Harp
- Percussion (5 small untuned drums, 5 small bells, 1 large tuned gong)
- Chamber Organ

Unusually, there is no conductor in the work—instead, the instrumental performers lead among themselves; the places at which each instrument is to lead are marked in the score. The lack of a conductor allows Britten to dispense with a universal tempo, the performers often instead playing in two or more separate groups at separate tempi, comparable to the sound of the music of a Nobayashi ensemble in Noh plays. This leads to another unusual notational device, the 'Curlew sign', which is used to 'resynchronise' previously separate groups of musicians by instructing one to sustain or repeat notes 'ad lib' until a given point has been reached in the music of another group. The harp part is heavily influenced by music for the koto and the chamber organ part features extensive use of tone clusters, which are derived from the shō, an ancient Japanese free-reed mouth organ used in gagaku court music. (Britten had become acquainted with this instrument while in Japan for two weeks in February 1956.)

Britten's chief compositional technique in Curlew River is heterophony, which he uses to extraordinary dramatic effect. It permeates all aspects of the work's composition, with textures derived from short, decorative couplings, or long, unsynchronised layers of melody. The opening plainsong ('Te lucis ante terminum') suggests many of the melodic shapes throughout the Parable.

As in many of Britten's other dramatic works, individual instruments are used to symbolise particular characters. In Curlew River, the flute and horn are used most clearly for this purpose, symbolising the Madwoman and Ferryman respectively. With such a small orchestra, Britten does not use the 'sound worlds' that are clearly demonstrated in his War Requiem and A Midsummer Night's Dream, nor the dramatic change in orchestral timbre (with the entry of the celesta and vibraphone, respectively) that accompanies the appearances of Quint in The Turn of the Screw or Tadzio in Death in Venice.

== Recordings ==
The composer and Viola Tunnard supervised the first commercial recording of the work, for Decca (Decca SET 301), with the following singers:

- Madwoman: Peter Pears
- Ferryman: John Shirley-Quirk
- Abbot: Harold Blackburn
- Traveller: Bryan Drake
- Voice of the Spirit: Bruce Webb
- The Pilgrims: Edmund Bohan, Edgar Boniface, Patrick Healy, Michael Kehoe, Peter Leeming, William McKinney, David Reed, Gerald Stern, Robert Tasman
