= John Shirley-Quirk =

English bass-baritone (1931–2014)

John Stanton Shirley-Quirk CBE (28 August 1931 – 7 April 2014) was an English bass-baritone. A member of the English Opera Group from 1964 to 1976, he gave premiere performances of several operatic and vocal works by Benjamin Britten, recording these and other works under the composer's direction. He also sang and recorded a wide range of works by other composers, ranging from Handel through Tchaikovsky to Henze.

== Biography ==
Shirley-Quirk was born in Liverpool and sang in the choir at Holt High School (today the Childwall Sports & Science Academy). He played the violin and was awarded a scholarship. While studying chemistry and physics at Liverpool University, he studied voice with Austen Carnegie. Shirley-Quirk was a lecturer in chemistry at Acton Technical College until 1957 and played a part in events leading to the formation of Brunel University. In that period he resumed his vocal studies with Roy Henderson. According to Imogen Holst, it was during this period while "earning his living as a schoolmaster" that Shirley-Quirk joined the Purcell Singers, performing at the Aldeburgh Festival. He was a Vicar Choral (choir singer or lay-clerk) at St Paul's Cathedral from 1961 to 1962.

In 1961 Shirley-Quirk was understudy for the role of Gregor Mittenhofer in the British premiere of Henze's Elegy for Young Lovers at the Glyndebourne Festival, and in the following year made his operatic debut in Debussy's Pelléas et Mélisande as the Doctor. He sang Brander in a Festival Hall performance of La Damnation de Faust conducted by Pierre Monteux in March 1962, the recording of which was later published. The following year he took part as a soloist in Bach's Christmas Oratorio in Ipswich, which was attended by Benjamin Britten, who introduced himself. Shirley-Quirk subsequently joined Britten's English Opera Group (EOG) in 1964. His first role with the EOG was to create the part of the ferryman in Curlew River, followed by the premiere performances of Canticle IV: Journey of the Magi. With the EOG, he made his Covent Garden debut in 1973, creating the multiple roles specially written for him in Death in Venice, in which he appears as various antagonists to the character of Gustav von Aschenbach. He made his debut at New York's Metropolitan Opera in the same roles the following year. It was also in 1974 that he sang at the Last Night of the Proms in Walton's Belshazzar's Feast.

With Scottish Opera he sang the roles among others of Count Almaviva, Don Giovanni, Don Alfonso, Mittenhofer (1970, Edinburgh Festival), Eugene Onegin and Golaud. He created the role of Gil-Martin in Thomas Wilson's Confessions of a Justified Sinner (1976).

In Shirley-Quirk's wide concert repertory, he was particularly noted as a fine interpreter of Friar Lawrence in Berlioz's Roméo et Juliette, and in the solos in Bach's Passions, Handel's oratorios, Haydn's The Creation and The Seasons, Brahms's German Requiem, Elgar's The Dream of Gerontius (which he recorded with Britten conducting) and Tippett's The Vision of St Augustine (recorded under the composer's baton in 1971). In 1977 Shirley-Quirk created the role of Lev in Tippett's The Ice Break at Covent Garden. He also distinguished himself as an intelligent and sympathetic interpreter of lieder, mélodies and English song.

Shirley-Quirk's vast discography includes many of Britten's works, Mahler's Eighth Symphony under Sir Georg Solti on Decca, and Vaughan Williams' vocal works under Sir David Willcocks and the Choir of King's College, Cambridge for EMI. He also sang in the premiere recording of Delius's Requiem in 1968, under Meredith Davies, shortly after a rare live performance (only the work's fifth performance in 62 years) at the Albert Hall with the same forces. Among his early recordings for Saga of British songs is the first complete version (including the Epilogue) of Vaughan Williams's Songs of Travel.

His vocal art was noted for its "authoritative yet richly communicative" quality, while the gift for musical and verbal detail of a natural Lieder singer and the "oiled-teak smoothness" of his voice took listeners "to profound interpretive depths".

Shirley-Quirk was appointed associate artistic director of the Aldeburgh Festival in 1982.From 1991 to 2012 he was on the faculty of the Peabody Conservatory of Music in Baltimore, MD. His students gave him the affectionate nickname "The Great Hyphen."

== Personal life ==
In 1975, Shirley-Quirk was appointed a Commander of the Order of the British Empire (CBE).

Shirley-Quirk was married to Patricia ("Pat") Hastie, who died in 1981, then oboist Sara Watkins, who died in 1997. In 2009 he married cellist Teresa Perez. He died of cancer at the age of 82 in Bath on 7 April 2014.
