= James Blades =

English percussionist (1901–1999)

James Blades OBE (9 September 1901 – 19 May 1999) was an English percussionist.

He was one of the most distinguished percussionists in Western music, with a long and varied career. His book Percussion Instruments and their History (1971) is a standard reference work on the subject.

Blades was born in Peterborough in 1901. He was a long-time associate of Benjamin Britten, with whom he conceived many of the composer's unusual percussion effects. In 1954, Blades was appointed Professor of Percussion at the Royal Academy of Music.

As a chamber musician he played with the Melos Ensemble and the English Chamber Orchestra.

Blades' pupils included the rock drummers Max Sedgley, Carl Palmer, and Richard James Burgess as well as percussionist Evelyn Glennie.

His most famous and widely heard performances were the sound of the drum playing "V-for-Victory" in Morse code, the introduction to the BBC broadcasts made to the European Resistance during World War II, and providing the sound of the gong seen at the start of films produced by the Rank Organisation. Blades played this sound on a tam-tam. On screen Blades's sound was interpreted by an actor miming a character called the "Gongman".

His autobiography Drum Roll: A Professional Adventure from the Circus to the Concert Hall was published by Faber & Faber in 1977.

== Portrayals ==
A one-man drama-documentary, James Blades - Pandemonium of the One-Man Band, was broadcast on BBC Radio 3 in November 2025 as part of the station's Sunday Feature strand. It was written by Robin Brooks and James Anthony-Rose, and recorded with Anthony-Rose playing Blades in front of a live audience at Snape Maltings Concert Hall.

== Bibliography ==
- Orchestral Percussion Techniques (Oxford: University, 1961) ISBN 978-0-19-318801-3
- Percussion Instruments and their History (London: Faber & Faber, 1971) ISBN 978-0-571-08858-4
- Early Percussion Instruments from the Middle Ages to the Baroque (Oxford: University, 1976) ISBN 978-0-19-323176-4 (with Jeremy Montagu)
- Drum Roll: A Professional Adventure from the Circus to the Concert Hall (London: Faber & Faber, 1977) ISBN 978-0-571-10107-8
- Ready to Play (London: BBC, 1978) ISBN 978-0-563-17610-7 (with Carole Ward)
- From Cave to Cavern (London: Sussex, 1982) ISBN 978-1-86013-138-7
- A Check-List of the Percussion Instruments in the Edinburgh University Collection of Historic Musical Instruments (Edinburgh: Reid School of Music, 1982) ISBN 978-0-907635-07-9
- How to Play Drums (London: Penguin, 1985) ISBN 978-0-241-11670-8 (with Johnny Dean)
- These I Have Met... (London: Music Sales, 1998) ISBN 978-0-905210-77-3
