= The Digby Conversion of Saint Paul =

Late fifteenth century English play

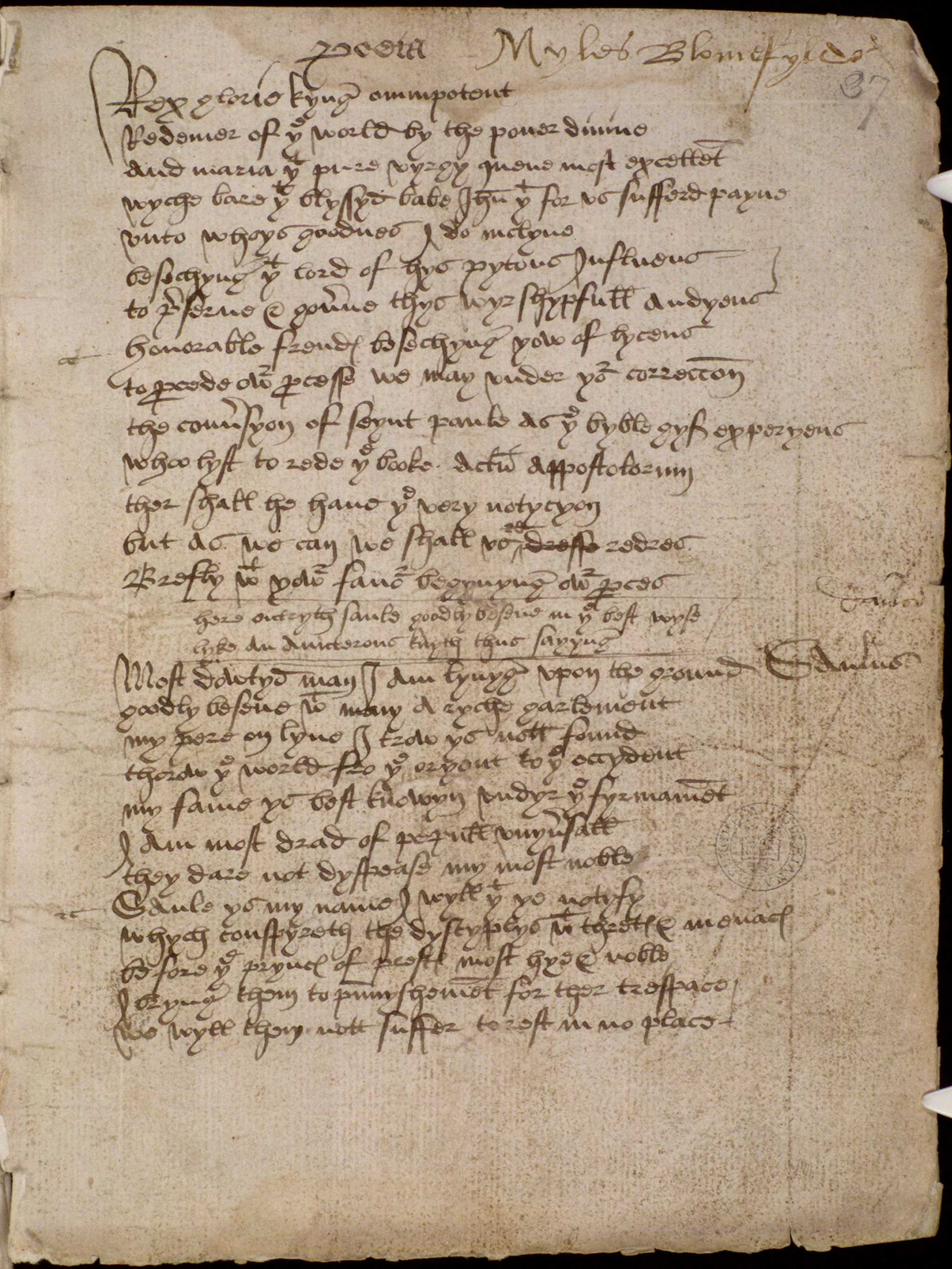
Opening page of the Conversion of Saint Paul (Bodleian Library, MS Digby 133, folio 37r)

The Digby Conversion of Saint Paul (or The Conuersyon of Seynt Paule) is a Middle English miracle play of the late fifteenth century. Written in rhyme royal, it is about the conversion of Paul the Apostle. It is part of a Digby collection of mystery plays that was bequeathed to the Bodleian Library by Sir Kenelm Digby in 1634.

== The Play ==
The action is in three well-defined parts, often, following medieval practice, referred to as "stations". Each of these stations is introduced and concluded by "Poeta" (Latin for poet).

The first station represents Jerusalem. After the prologue there follows a dance, the direction for which has been added in by a later hand, seemingly in an attempt to make the piece more exciting. The play proper begins with Saul, dressed in rich apparel, boasting of his power and of the fear which he inspires, doing so "a little in the Herod style". The priests Caypha and Anna give him letters to take to Damascus, where he is to suppress heresy (i.e. the worship of Jesus). Saul then gathers together his knights and servants, who agree to follow him. There follows a comic scene, not present in other versions of the Conversion, between one of Saul's servants and an hostler, who ready a horse which Saul then rides off on. Poeta re-enters to "mak a conclusyon" of this first station, and again the stage direction "daunce" has been written in a later hand.

In the next station, on the road to Damascus, God, amidst thunder and lightning, visits Saul and rebukes him for persecuting His followers and tells him to enter Damascus. When the visitation is over Saul finds that he is blind and lame. God also visits Ananias, an inhabitant of Damascus, and tells him to go and cure Saul, assuring him that from now on Saul will advance, rather than persecute, Christianity. As Ananias visits Saul the Holy Spirit appears above them, and Saul is healed and baptised.

In the third station Saul's knights have returned to Jerusalem, where they tell an angry Caypha and Anna of Paul's conversion to and preaching of Christianity. At this point three leaves have been inserted in a different hand. They make up a comic scene between the demon Belial (whose first line is "the usual Satanic exclamation of the mystery writers 'Ho ho'") and his messenger, named Mercury. Again, Joseph Quincy Adams believes this has been included to make the play more exciting. The choice of Belial as the chief demon seems to have been influenced by Saul's swearing "By the god Bellyall" in his first scene. The interpolated text also contains material that could be seen as anti-Semitic and which is not mirrored in the main text – Belial claims that he is worshipped "In the temples and synogoges" and that Caypha and Anna are his "prelates" and are planning to persecute Saul on his suggestion. Heather Hill-Vásquez, however, interprets Caypha and Anna (in the 16th-century version) as standing for Catholic bishops and their link to Belial as a Protestant Reformation attack on the old religion in a play that is an appropriation of one of its forms of dissemination, the (processional) Saint play.

The play proper resumes with Saul (the play does not include his renaming as Paul), now dressed as a disciple of Jesus, delivering to the audience a rather lengthy sermon on the Seven Deadly Sins. Saul is taken to Caypha and Anna, who order the gates of the city to be locked that they might kill him shortly. However, an angel appears and tells Saul that he will not die yet, and that a place for him in heaven is assured. Saul's escape from the city in a basket is described, not staged. The play ends with Poeta inviting the audience to sing the hymn Exultet caelum laudibus. While Scherb praises the swift ending and finds its reliance on words rather than images appropriate to the play's thematic focus on faith and the movement from iconography to rhetoric, Coldewey simply finds it abrupt.

== Scholarship ==
The text of The Conversion of Saint Paul is one of five plays (one a fragment) bound together in MS Digby 133, which is preserved in the Bodleian Library, having been bequeathed to it by Sir Kenelm Digby in 1634. Though critics sometimes write of a "Digby playwright" (particularly when examining the Conversion alongside the Mary Magdalene, the other surviving English Saint play derived from the New Testament), the pieces are in fact independent; though the plays' first modern editor, Thomas Sharp, sees in the Conversion "a considerable resemblance in general structure and composition to [The Digby Massacre of the Innocents]" The plays date from the late fifteenth century and have a transcription date of 1512 on the first page. As well as the Conversion and The Digby play of Mary Magdalene there are plays on the Massacre of the Innocents and the resurrection of Jesus, and an incomplete version of the morality play Wisdom entitled Wisdom, Who is Christ.

Adams believed the play to have been written by an author from the East Midlands, to be performed at stations in a small village on 25 January, that being the Festival of the Conversion of St. Paul. And while A. M. Kinghorn has it that the play was performed in a fixed locality and was the responsibility, not of the town's guilds, but of the church; Glynne Wickham, citing the text's many apologies for its "simpleness", argued that the play, in its final form at any rate, belonged "to a Guild of artisans who were willing to travel and to adapt their script and presentation to the environment offered by their sponsors and hosts in exchange for hospitality and a small fee" and thus, while the Digby plays may have originated, like the so-called Macro plays – The Castle of Perseverance, Mankind, and Wisdom –, in or near Bury St Edmunds in East Anglia, they were able to migrate to Chelmsford in the 16th century.

Furnivall could see little in the play that pointed to a specific dialect, other than a few instances that inclined him more to a Midlands dialect than anything else. A later editor, Coldewey, described the dialect as East Anglian, though note that the East Midlands border on East Anglia.

Sarah Salih has speculated that The Book of Margery Kempe, written in East Anglia, could have provided inspiration for the Digby plays of conversion, that is the Conversion of Paul and the Mary Magdalene.

The interpolations to the original text (the marginal "daunce" stage directions and the three leaves containing the scene between the devils) seem to come from an early sixteenth-century revival of the piece, and were possibly the work of a man named Myles Blomfylde (whose exact identity is unclear), who may have played the role of Poeta.

The play was not much admired by its 19th- and early 20th-century editors: Furnivall wrote that it (and the Digby mysteries as a whole) pointed to "the decay of the old religious Drama in England" and Manly found it "uninteresting" and of only historical value. Adams has sympathy with the later author's attempt to introduce more excitement to the piece and goes so far as to omit almost entirely Saul's long sermon on the Seven Deadly Scenes on the grounds of its having "no dramatic value". For Chester N. Scoville, however, it is just this sermon, rather than Saul's actual conversion, that is at the heart of the play. In this Scoville is typical of late 20th- and 21st-century critics, who have found richness in the play and, in its unclear staging, strategies for interpretation.

== Staging ==
"The audience, which is made to be more directly involved in this than in perhaps any other Middle English play, must both physically and rhetorically reconfigure itself constantly to engage with the scenes played before it."

— Chester N. Scoville, Saints and the Audience in Middle English Biblical Drama

"Poeta: Honorable frendes, beseechyng yow of lycens / To proceede owr processe … / … / … with yowr favour, begynyng owr proces"

— lines 8–9, 14

"Poeta: Fynally, of this stacon thus we mak a conclusyon, / Besecchyng thys audyens to folow and succede / With all your delygens this generall processyon"

— lines 155-7

The play's earliest editors all agreed the original production would have been of the processional sort, with a wagon travelling between three different stations to perform the three scenes of the play, and the audience following, rather as they would performing the Stations of the Cross. The need to accommodate a horse must have meant that the wagon would be fairly large, and with an upper story in order for the Holy Spirit to appear above and from which thunderbolts could be thrown. Lines in Saul's sermon – "thys semely [assembly] that here syttyth or stonde" – led scholars to conjecture that a scaffold may have been erected for this and perhaps other stations.

It was not until the 1970s that Glynne Wickham, first in an essay and then in his edition of the play, challenged this conception, arguing that the three stations had taken the form either of mobile "pageants" or fixed "mansions" grouped together on a single acting area, or "platea". As William Tydeman points out, much hinges on how one interprets "processyon" in line 157 – as referring to a physical procession, or to the procession of the stage action. As this line is part of a passage marked "si placet" (i.e. optional) in the text, Wickham believes it hardly likely to have been a direction to the audience, and that it should be interpreted, along with "proces" in line 9 and 14, as signifying the thrust of an argument, and not physical movement. In his edition of 1993, Coldewey takes up a revisionist stance, believing that the play was processional in nature and clearly unconvinced by Wickham's argument.

Victor I. Scherb, taking the processional staging as read, builds from it an interpretation that sees the play as a theatrical triptych that uses framing devices which serve to draw the audience's focus on the central scene, that of Saul's conversion. This station is framed spatially not only by the procession, but also in terms of "high" and "low", thanks to scenes involving God, devils and ostlers. Indeed, the ostler with ideas above his station being seen thrown in dung is taken as a reflection of Saul's own pride, for which he is cast down on the road to Damascus. The purpose of these devices is to provide the audience – turned, thanks to the amount of direct address in the play, into a congregation – with a spiritual model of the turning away from worldliness.

== Performances ==
For the 1982 production at Winchester Cathedral the stage direction "daunce" was interpreted as a means of moving the audience across stations.

The Digby Conversion of St. Paul was also performed in 1994 by Poculi Ludique Societas in Toronto.

In November 2000, The Marlowe Project, a production company devoted to early theatre, performed The Conversion of Saint Paul at the Church for All Nations in New York City. The text was modernised and slightly adapted by director Jeff Dailey, who also wrote about the problems performing the play in his article, "Saint Paul's Horse and Related Problems" in the 2001 edition of Research Opportunities in Renaissance Drama.

== See also ==
- Acts of the Apostles the primary source for the play
- Conversio Beati Pauli Apostoli a liturgical drama about the conversion of Paul
- Paul a 21st-century dramatisation of the story by Howard Brenton

== Editions ==
- Ancient Mysteries from the Digby Manuscripts edited by Thomas Sharp, printed for the Abbotsford Club by the Edinburgh Printing Company, 1835

Ancient Mysteries from the Digby Manuscripts at the Internet Archive
Ancient Mysteries from the Digby Manuscripts at the Internet Archive

- The Digby Mysteries edited by F. J. Furnivall, New Shakspere Society/N. Trübner & Co., 1882

The Digby Mysteries at the Internet Archive
The Digby Mysteries at the Internet Archive

- Specimens of the Pre-Shaksperean Drama, Vol. 1 edited by John Matthews Manly, Ginn and Company, Boston, 1897

Specimens of the Pre-Shaksperean Drama at the Internet Archive
Specimens of the Pre-Shaksperean Drama at the Internet Archive
Specimens of the Pre-Shaksperean Drama at the Internet Archive
Specimens of the Pre-Shaksperean Drama at the Internet Archive
Specimens of the Pre-Shaksperean Drama at the Internet Archive

- The Late Medieval Religious Plays of Bodleian MSS Digby 133 and E. Museo 160 edited by Donald C. Baker, John L. Murphy and Louis B. Hall, published for the Early English Text Society by the Oxford University Press, 1982
- The Digby Plays: Facsimiles of the Plays in Bodleian MSS Digby 133 and E. Museo 160 edited by Donald C. Baker and John L. Murphy, Leeds, 1976
