= List of English translations from medieval sources: D =

The list of English translations from medieval sources: D provides an overview of notable medieval documents—historical, scientific, ecclesiastical and literature—that have been translated into English. This includes the original author, translator(s) and the translated document. Translations are from Old and Middle English, Old French, Old Norse, Latin, Arabic, Greek, Persian, Syriac, Ethiopic, Coptic, Armenian, and Hebrew, and most works cited are generally available in the University of Michigan's HathiTrust digital library and OCLC's WorldCat. Anonymous works are presented by topic.

== List of English translations ==
=== DA–DE ===
Dadīshōʿ Ḳaṭrāya. Dadīshōʿ Ḳaṭrāya (7th century) was a Nestorian monk and author of ascetic literature in Syriac.

- A treatise on solitude by Dadīshōʿ Ḳaṭrāya (1934). Edited and translated by Iraqi historian Alphonse Mingana (1878–1937). In Woodbrooke Studies: Christian Documents in Syriac, Arabic, and Garshūni, Volume VII (1934), pp. 70–143, 201–247.

Dafydd ap Gwilym. Dafydd ap Gwilym (c. 1315 – c. 1370) was one of the leading Welsh poets in the Middle Ages and was a contemporary of Chaucer's.

- Poems translated from the Welsh of Dafydd ap Gwilym (1818). By William Owen Pughe (1759–1835). In Cambrian register, Volume III (1818), pp. 436–468.
- Translations into English verse from the poems of Davyth ap Gwilym, a Welsh bard of the fourteenth century (1834). By a translator only identified as Maelog, with A sketch of the life of Davyth ap Gwilym. Dedicated to William Owen Pughe.
- The poetry of Dafydd ap Gwilym (1925). Translated by E. C. Knowlton. In Poet lore., Volume XXXVI (1925), pp. 415–433.
- Dafydd ap Gywilym: fifty poems (1942). Translated by Harold Idris Bell (1879–1967) and David Bell. In Y Cymmrodor, Volume XLVIII (1942).

Dane saga of Breda. A late fifteenth- or early sixteenth Middle Dutch cross legend (in verse) from the town of Breda, outlining the local presence and pursuits of ‘viking’ mariners.

- "The Dane saga of Breda: A Late Medieval Account of Viking Endeavour and Vernacular Devotion", edited and translated by Christian Cooijmans, in The Medieval Low Countries, 11 (2024).

Daniel the Pilgrim. Daniel the Pilgrim (fl. c. 1107), also known as Daniel the Higumenos (abbot), was an eastern Christian who travelled from Kievan Rus’ to the Holy Land. He documented his travels in his Puteshestive igumena Daniil.

- The pilgrimage of the Russian abbot Daniel in the Holy Land, 1106–1107 AD (1895). Translated and edited by British archaeologist Charles W. Wilson (1836–1905). In the library of Palestine Pilgrims' Text Society (PPTS), Volume IV, Part 3.

Dante Alighieri. Dante Alighieri (c. 1265 – 1321) was an Italian poet, writer and philosopher, author of the Divine Comedy. A relatively small sample of biographies and translations of Dante are shown below, with various bibliographies.

- The earliest lives of Dante (1901). By Italian humanist, historian and statesman Leonardo Arentino Bruni (c. 1370 – 1444). Translated from the Italian of Giovanni Boccaccio and Lionardo Bruni Aretino [Leonardo Arentino Bruni] by James Robinson Smith (1876–1954). In Yale Studies in English, Volume 10 (1901).
- The early lives of Dante (1904). By Leonardo A. Bruni. Translated by English economist and medievalist Philip Henry Wicksteed (1844–1927), derived from the translation of J. R. Smith.
- Dante (1900). By English scholar of Italian literature Edmund Garratt Gardner (1869–1935).
- Dante and Giovanni del Virgilio (1902), by Philip H. Wicksteed and Edmund G. Gardner.
- Il Fiore and Il Fiore and Detto d'Amore (2000). A late 13th-century Italian translation of the Roman de la Roseattributable to Dante Alighieri. Edited and translated by Santa Casciani and Christopher Kleinhenz.
- The new life: (La vita nuova) (1907). An edition of La vita nuova, translated by English poet Dante Gabriel Rossetti (1828–1882), with an introduction by American author Charles Eliot Norton (1827–1908). Also includes: One hundred sonnets, by Francesco Petrarch; La fiammetta, by Giovanni Boccaccio; and Poems, by Michelangelo Buonarroti.
- De vulgari eloquentia: Dante's book of exile (1990). A translation of Dante's Latin essay De vulgari eloquentia (1302-1305) by Marianne Shapiro.
- The Convivio of Dante Alighieri (1903). An edition of Convivio (The Banquet), translated by Philip H. Wicksteed.
- De monarchia (1879). In Dante: An essay, by Richard William Church (1815–1890). Includes an edition of De monarchia, translated by Frederick John Church (1854–1888).
- The vision: or, Hell, Purgatory and Paradise of Dante Alighieri (1892). A later edition of the first English language translation of the Divine Comedy, first published in 1782, by the Rev. Henry Francis Cary (1772–1844). With a life of Dante, chronological view of his age, additional notes, and an index.
- The Divine Comedy of Dante Alighieri (1867–1871). Translated by Henry Wadsworth Longfellow (1807–1882).
- Inferno: a translation from Dante Alighieri, into English blank verse (1812). A translation of the Inferno by Joseph Hume (1777–1855).
- The Purgatorio of Dante Alighieri (1912). An edition of Purgatorio. Edited by H. Oelsner, responsible for the Italian text and notes at the end of the cantos. Translated into English by Italian translator Thomas Okey (1852–1935), with contributions by Philip H. Wicksteed.
- The Paradiso of Dante Alighieri (1912). An edition of Paradiso, edited and translated by Philip H. Wicksteed, with Herman Oelsner (born 1871).
- Eclogae Latinae (1902). A critical edition of Eclogae, in Dante and Giovanni del Virgilio (1902), by Philip H. Wicksteed and Edmund G. Gardner.
- Dante: Quaestio de aqua et terra (1909). Dante's work, dated 1320, is a Latin discussion in Latin of a problem in medieval cosmology, is edited and translated by Charles Lancelot Shadwell (1840–1919).
- Catalogue of the Dante collection, 2 volumes plus addition (1898–1900). Presented by American librarian Willard Fiske (1831–1904) and compiled by Theodore Wesley Koch (1871–1941). Additions (1898–1920) compiled by Mary Fowler, curator of the Dante and Petrarch collections from 1907 to 1920. Includes works by Dante and works about Dante.
- Dante in America (1896–1897). Includes a bibliography of American translations and studies of Dante. By Theodore W. Koch. Reprinted from the Fifteenth annual report of the Dante Society (1896).
- A chronological list of English translations from Dante, from Chaucer to the present day, 1380–1906. By British Dantean scholar Paget Jackson Toynbee (1855–1932). Reprinted in the Twenty-fourth annual report of the Dante Society (1906).
- Bibliography of works by Dante.
- English translations of the Divine Comedy.

Dares Phrygius. Dares Phrygius, according to Homer, was a Trojan priest of Hephaestus. His work was a source of Joseph of Exeter's De bello Troiano ("On the Trojan War").

- Daretis Phrygii de excidio Troiae historia. An account in Latin of the destruction of Troy. In Chronicle of the Kings of Britain (1811) by Peter Roberts (c. 1760–1819).
- The History of Troy by Dares Phrygius. In Medieval Narrative: A book of Translations, by Margaret Schlauch.
- ‘The faythfull and true storye of the Destruction of Troy, compyled by Dares Phrygius …’ (1553), John Cawood, London. Translated by Thomas Paynell.

Dastin, John. John Dastin (c.1293 – c.1386) was an English alchemist of the fourteenth century.

- 'The works of John Dastin', in Theatrvm Chemicvm Britannicum, containing severall poeticall pieces of our famous English philosophers, who have written the hermetique mysteries in their owne ancient language (1652), by Elias Ashmole.

Jalal al-Din al-Dawani. Jalal al-Din al-Dawani (1426–1502) was a theologian, philosopher, jurist, and poet, who is considered to have been one of the leading scholars in late 15th-century Iran.

- A Civil and Military Review in Fārs in 881/1476 (1940). Translated by Vladimir Minorsky.
- Practical philosophy of the Muhammadan people, exhibited in its professed connexion with the European, being a translation of the Akhlāk-i-Jalāly, the most esteemed ethical if Middle Ages (1839). Translated from the Persian by William Francis Thompson.

David ben Sa'del. David ben Sa'del (also known as al-Hiti) was a Karaite Jewish chronicler who flourished (probably in Egypt) in the first half of the fifteenth century CE.

- Ibn Al-Hītī's Arabic Chronicle of Karaite Doctors (1897). Translated by G. Margoliouth.

David von Augsburg. David von Augsburg (early 13th century – 19 November 1272) was a medieval German mystic, and a Franciscan friar.

- Spiritual Life and Progress by David of Augsburg (1240s), transcribed by Dominic Devas.

Day of Judgement. "A description of the Day of Judgement." Welch text of the 15th century, translated by Thomas Powell.

Di composicione chilindri. A Thirteenth- Century Latin Treatise on the Chilindre — "For by my chilindre it is prime of day" (Shipmannes Tale). Edited, with a translation, by Edmund Brock, and illustrated by a woodcut of the Instrument from the Ashmole MS, 1522. In Essays on Chaucer (1868).

De pomo. De pomo (apple) is one of the spurious works that were attributed to Aristotle. Known as The Book of the Apple (Tractatus de pomo et morte incliti principis philosophorum Aristotelis), it is a medieval neoplatonic Arabic work of unknown authorship, sometimes ascribed to Aristotle.

- Ha-Tapnach, an imitation of Plato's Phaedor ascribed to Aristotle the Stagyrite (1885). Translated by Isidor Kalisch.
- The Book of the Apple, ascribed to Aristotle (1892). Translated by D. S. Margoliouth.
- The Targum to "The Song of songs." The book of the apple. The ten Jewish martyrs. A dialogue on games of chance (1908). Translated from the Hebrew and Aramaic by Hermann Gollancz.

De rebaptismate. "Anonymous treatise on re-baptism," translated by Robert E. Wallis. Early Church Fathers, Volume XIII.

Debat des hérauts d'armes de France et d'Angleterre. England and France in the fifteenth century in a contemporary tract presumed by be written by Charles, Duke of Orléans. Entitled "The debate between the heralds of France and England," translated by Henry Pyne (1808–1885).

Debate of the body and the soul. "Debate of the body and the soul" (Desputisoun bitwen be Bodi and be Soule) is a late 13th century Latin poem. Updated and translated by Francis James Child.

Decian persecution. "The Libelli of the Decian Persecution," edited and translated by John R. Knipling. Forty one extant libelli concerning Decian persecution.

Declán of Ardmore. Declán of Ardmore (died 5th century AD) was an early Irish saint of the Déisi Muman, who was remembered for having converted the Déisi in the late 5th century and for having founded the monastery of Ardmore (Ard Mór).

- Life of St. Declán (1914), edited and translated by the Rev. Patrick C. Power. Life of St. Declan of Ardmore, (ed. from ms. in Bibliothèque royale, Brussels), and Life of St. Mochuda of Lismore, (ed. from ms. in Library of Royal Irish academy).

Désatír. Désatír is a Zoroastrian mystic text written in an invented language. Although purporting to be of ancient origin, it is now generally regarded as a literary forgery, most probably authored in the 16th or 17th century by Azar Kayvan, the leader of the Zoroastrian Illuminationist sect.

- Desatir, or, Sacred writings of the ancient Persian prophets : in the original tongue ... with the ancient Persian version and commentary of the fifth (1818). Mulla Firuz. Sasan. Bombay: Courier press.

Desclot, Bernard. Bernard Desclot (fl. 1300) was a Catalan chronicler whose work covered the reign of Peter III of Aragon (1276–1285), one of the four Catalan Grand Chronicles.

- Chronicle of the Reign of King Peter III of Aragon, 1276–85 (1928). Partially translated by F. L. Critchlow.

Dési genealogies. "The Dési genealogies (from the Book of Ballymore)," edited and translated by John MacNeill.

=== DH–DU ===
Dhahabi, Muhammad ibn Ahmad al-. Al-Dhahabi (1274–1348) was an Athari theologian, Islamic historian and Hadith scholar. He wrote a work concerning Abdul Qadir Gilani called "Contributions to the Biography of 'Abd al-Kadir of Jilan," translated by D. S. Margoliouth.

Dialogus Athansil et Zachary. An argument between a Christian, Athanasius, and a Jew, Zacharus. "A new second-century Christian dialogue," translated from the Armenian by F. C. Conybeare, The expositor, 5th set. V (1897).

Dialogus inter corpus et animam. "Dialogus inter corpus et animam," translated by Clark Sutherland Northup (1901). A Latin text from the 14th century Debate of the body and the soul.

Dialogus inter militem et clericum. A work by Cornish writer John Trevista (fl. 1342–1402).

- John Trevista (1925). Dialogus inter militem et clericum, Richard FitzRalph's sermon: 'Defensio curatorum' and Methodius 'the bygynnyng of the world and the ende of worldes', by John Trevisa, vicar of Berkeley; now first edited from the mss. Harl. 1900, St. John's College, Camb., H. 1, Add. 24194, Stowe 65, and Chetham's library, with an introduction on the description of the mss., Trevisa's life and works, and a study of the language by Aaron Jenkins Perry. Some work attributed to William Ockham and also to Pierre du Bois. Early English Text Society, No. 167.

Diambiad messe bad ri rëil. "Advice to a prince," edited and translated by Tadhg O'Donoghue. Authorship uncertain. Text from the Book of Leinster.

Diarmait mac Aeda Sláine and Guaire Aldine. Stories of high-king Diarmait mac Áedo Sláine and Guaire Aidne mac Colmáin, a king of Connacht.

- "The battle of Carn Conaill," edited and translated by Whitney Stokes. in Zeitschrift für celtische Philologie, III (1901–1902). The Battle of Carn Conaill in 635 was won by Diarmait mac Áedo Sláine against Guaire Aidne mac Colmáin.
- "The battle of Carn Conaill," in Silva Gadelica (1892), edited and translated by Standish Hayes O'Grady.
- "Colman Mac Duach and Guaire," edited and translated by J. G. O'Keeffe (1904). Another version is by Whitley Stokes.
- "Imtheacht na Tromdhaimhe" [The proceedings of the great bardic institution in which is explained how the Táin Bó Cúailnge (the cattle raid of Cúailnge (Cooley) was first discovered], edited and translated by Owen Connellan. An account of the assemblly of the poets at Guaire's court, of their demands, and how they are asked to relate the story of the Táin.
- "Tochmare Boc-Fola," edited and translated by Bryan O'Looney. The story is of the wooing of Becfola by Diarmait. Royal Irish Academy, Irish Manuscript Series (1870), pgs. 172–183.
- "King and hermit; a colloquy between King Guaire of Aidne and his brother Marban, being an Irish poem of the tenth century," edited and translated by Kuno Meyer (1901).

Dairmait mac Cerbaill. "The setting of the manor of Tara," edited and translated by Richard Irving Best (1910). A tale of high-king Dairmait mac Cerbaill, king of Tara, from the Yellow Book of Lecan.

Díaz de Gámez, Gutierre. Gutierre Díaz de Gámez (c. 1379 – c. 1450) served as the head of the military household of Castilian privateer Pero Niño.

- "The unconquered knight, a chronicle of the deeds of Pero Niño, count of Buelna, by his standard-bearer Gutierre Díaz de Gámez (1431–1449)," translated and selected from El Vitoria, by Joan Evans (1928).

Diceto, Ralph de. Ralph de Diceto (c. 1120 – c. 1202) was archdeacon of Middlesex, dean of St Paul's Cathedral, and the author of a major chronicle divided into two parts—often treated as separate works—the Abbreviationes Chronicorum from the birth of Jesus to the 1140s and theYmagines Historiarum from that point until 1202.

- "The history of the archbishop of Canterbury, from the first foundation of the see to the year one thousand two hundred," The church historians of England, IV, part 1 (1856), pgs. 315–338, translated by the Rev. Joseph Stevenson.

Didascalia apostolorum. Didascalia apostolorum is an early Christian legal treatise which belongs to the genre of the Church Orders. It presents itself as being written by the Twelve Apostles at the time of the Council of Jerusalem; however, scholars agree that it was actually a later composition, with most estimates suggesting the 3rd century, and other estimates suggesting potentially as late as the 4th century.

- The Ethiopic Didascalia; or the Ethiopic version of the Apostolical constitutions received in the church of Abyssinia, with an English translation (1834). Edited and translated by Thomas Pell Platt.
- The Ethiopic Didascalia (1920), by John Mason Harden. Society for Promoting Christian Knowledge.
- The Didascalia apostolorum in English (1903), translated from the Syriac by Margaret Dunlop Gibson.
- Didascalia apostolorum (1929). The Syriac version translated and accompanied by the Verona Latin fragments, with an introduction and notes by Richard Hugh Connelly.

Dietrich von Bern. Dietrich von Bern is the name of a character in Germanic heroic legend who originated as a legendary version of the Ostrogothic king Theodoric the Great.

- "Thithrek's saga." Survivals in Old Norwegian of medieval English, French, and German literature, together with the Latin versions of the heroic legend of Walter of Aquitaine (1941). Part III, pgs. 50–110. Translated by Hamilton Martin Smyser and Francis Peabody Magoun.

Digby plays. Digby plays were Middle English plays written between 1460 and 1550. bound together by Keneim Digby. They include the Conversion of Saint Paul and Wisdom.

- "The conversion of Saint Paul," the Malvern Festival Plays (1933), arranged for production by H. K. Ayliff, with an introduction by Hugh Walpole and a preface by Sir Barry Jackson.
- The Digby plays, with an incomplete 'morality' of Wisdom, who is Christ (part of one of the Macro moralities) (1896). By Paul Hamelius and Frederick James Furnivall. Early English Text Society.

Dionysius bar Salibi. Dionysius bar Salibi (died 1171) was a Syriac Orthodox writer and bishop, who served as metropolitan of Amid, in Upper Mesopotamia, from 1166 to 1171.

- A clear and learned explication of the history of our blessed Saviour Jesus Christ, taken out of about thirty Greek, Syriac, and other oriental authors, by way of catena, by Dionysius Syrus, who flourish'd most illustriously in the tenth and eleventh centuries, and faithfully translated by Dudley Loftus. (1695).
- An ancient Syriac translation of the Koran exhibiting new verses and variants, translated by Alphonse Mingana. In the Bulletin of the John Rylands Library, IX (1925), pgs. 188–235.
- A treatise of Barsalibi against the Melchities, edited and translated by Alphonse Mingana. Bulletin of the John Rylands Library, XI (1927), pgs. 125–203.
- The work of Dionysius Barsalibi against the Armenians (1931), translated by Alphonse Mingana. Originally published as part of: Woodbrooke studies: Christian documents in Syriac, Arabic, and Garshūni, Cambridge : W. Heffer and Sons.

Dionysius Carthusianus. Dionysius Carthusianus, or Denis the Carthusian, (1402–1471) was a Roman Catholic theologian and mystic.

- Spiritual writings: contemplation, meditation, prayer; the fountain of light and the paths of life monastic profession; exhortation to novices/ Denis the Carthusian; translated by Íde M. Ní Riain; with an introduction by Terrence O'Reilly.
- Vices and virtues, Denis the Carthusian, ecstatic doctor, translated from the original Latin by Íde M. Ní Riain.

Dionysius of Alexandria. Dionysius of Alexandria (the Great) was Patriarch of Alexandria from 28 December 248 until his death on 22 March 264. Most information known about him comes from a large corpus of correspondence. Only one complete letter survives; the remaining letters are excerpted in the works of Eusebius.

- The works of Gregory Thaumaturgus, Dionysius of Alexandria, and Archelaus (1871), translated by Stewart Dingwall Fordice Salmond. Anti-Nicene Christian Library XX.
- St. Dionysius of Alexandria; letters and treatises (1918), translated by Charles Lett Feltoe, Society for promoting Christian knowledge.

Dionysius the Pseudo-Areopagite. Dionysius the Pseudo-Areopagite was a Greek author, Christian theologian and Neoplatonicphilosopher of the late 5th to early 6th century, who wrote a set of works known as the Corpus Areopagiticum or Corpus Dionysiacum. Through his writing in Mystical Theology, he has been identified as the "progenitor of apophatic or negative theology."

- The celestial and ecclesiastical hierarchy of Dionysius the Areopagite (1894), now first translated into English from the original Greek by John Parker.
- Dionysius, the Areopagite, on the Divine names and Mystical theology (1940), by Clarence Edwin Rolt.
- The mystical divinity of Dionysius the Areopagite (1657). Translated into English by Dr. John Everard.
- Mysticism: its true nature and value with a translation of the "Mystical theology" of Dionysius, and of the letters to Caius and Dorotheus (1, 2 and 5) (1910). Translated by Alfred Bowen Sharpe.
- The mystical theology of Dionysius the Areopagite, with elucidatory commentary by the editors of the Shrine of Wisdom, and poem on the superessential radiance of the divine darkness by St. John of the Cross (1923).
- A Cosmological Tract by Pseudo-Dionysius in the Syriac Language (1917), By Giuseppe Furlani.
- The conflicts of the Holy Apostles: an apocryphal book of the early Eastern Church (1871). Translated from an Ethiopic ms. by Solomon Caesar Malan.
- “An Arabic Version of the Epistle of Dionysius the Areopagite to Timothy.” (1900), by W. Scott Watson. The American Journal of Semitic Languages and Literatures, vol. 16, no. 4, pgs.. 225–241.

Domhnall Chnuie an Bhile mac Carthaigh. "Mér loites lucht an indluig," Aser. to Domhnall Chnuie an Bhile Mac Carthaigh, from the Book of Fermoy, folio 23.

- “Address to David O’Keeffe.” (1910), by Eleanor Knott, Ériu, vol. 4.

Dominici, Giovanni. Giovanni Dominici (c. 1355 – 10 June 1419) was an Italian Catholic prelate and Dominican who became a cardinal.

- Regola del governo di cura familiare, parte quarta, On the education of children, (1927), translated and with an introduction by Arthur Basil Coté.

Domitius, Mar. History of Mar Domitius the healer (1938), translated from the Syriac by Alice M. Taylor.

Domnall mac Áedo. Domnall mac Áedo was High King of Ireland from 628 until his death. He belonged to the Cenél Conaill kindred of the Northern Uí Néill. He fought in the Battle of Magh Rath in the summer of 637 against his foster son Congal Cáech, King of Ulaid, supported by his ally Domnall Brecc, King of Dál Riata. The battle resulted in a decisive victory for Domnall and his army, and Congal Cáech was killed in the fighting.

- The Banquet of Dun na n-Gedh and The battle of Magh Rath (1842): an ancient and historical tale, now first published from a manuscript in the library of Trinity College, Dublin, with a translation and notes by John O'Donovan.
- “A New Version of the Battle of Mag Rath,” (1911). Translated by Carl Marstrander. Ériu, vol. 5.

Donation of Constantine. Donation of Constantine is a forged Roman imperial decree by which the 4th-century emperor Constantine the Great supposedly transferred authority over Rome and the western part of the Roman Empire to the Pope. Lorenzo Valla, an Italian Catholic priest and Renaissance humanist, is credited with first exposing the forgery with solid philological arguments in 1439–1440, although the document's authenticity had been repeatedly contested since 1001.

- The treatise of Lorenzo Valla on the Donation of Constantine (1922). Text and translation into English [by] Christopher B. Coleman.
- "The forged Dontation of Constatine (c. 800 A.D.)", in Select historical documents of the Middle Ages (1903), translated and edited by Ernest F. Henderson, pgs. 319–328.

Donatus, Aelius. Aelius Donatus (fl. mid-fourth century AD) was a Roman grammarian and teacher of rhetoric.

- The Ars minor of Donatus: for one thousand years the leading textbook of grammar (1926). Translated from the Latin, with introductory sketch, by Wayland Johnson Chase. Duff's "Fifteenth century English books" (see below) lists two versions of this work, 1495 and 1499, published by Wynkyn de Worde.

Dorotheus of Tyre. Dorotheus (c. 255 – 362), bishop of Tyre, is traditionally credited with an Acts of the Seventy Apostles.

- Ancient ecclesiastical histories..., by three learned historiographers, Eusebius, Socrates, and Evagrias...whereupon is annotated Dorotheus. (1577), translated by Meredith Hanmer. Illustrated by Thomas Vautrollier.

Dragon myths. Dragons in mythology from medieval literature.

- The Celtic dragon myth (1911). By John Francis Campbell (1821–1885), with the Geste of Fraoch and the dragon, translated with introduction by Scottish Gaelic scholar George Henderson (1866–1912). Illustrations in colour by Rachel Ainslie Grant Duff.
- Beowulf is an Old English epic poem in the tradition of Germanic heroic legend and is one of the most important and most often translated works of Old English literature.
- Life of Efflamm (11th–12th century), in Legends and romances of Brittany (1917), by Lewis Spence, with thirty-two illustrations by W. Otway Cannell. How Arthur attempted to slay a dragon.
- The History of the Kings of Britain (Historia Regum Britanniae) (c. 1136), by Geoffrey of Monmouth. Dragons in the underground lake whose fighting upsets Uther Pendragon's tower, as revealed by Merlin.
- The Volsunga saga (1906). Translated from the Icelandic by Eirikr Magnusson and William M. [sic] Morris. The Völsunga saga includes the story of Sigurd and Brunhild, and, most famously, Sigurd killing the serpent/dragon Fáfnir and obtaining the cursed ring Andvaranaut that Fáfnir guarded.

Dream of the Rood. The Dream of the Rood is an Old English Christian poems in the genre of dream poetry and written in alliterative verse. Preserved in the 10th-century Vercelli Book, the poem may be as old as the 8th-century Ruthwell Cross, and is considered as one of the oldest works of Old English literature.

- The Holy Rood, a dream (1866). A translation of the poem Dream of the Rood, once attributed to Cynewulf or Cædmon. In The Ruthwell cross, Northumbria (1866), by English archeologist and philologist George Stephens (1813–1895).

Droplaugarsona saga. Droplaugarsona saga (listen^{ⓘ}) is one of the Icelanders' sagas, probably written in the 13th century. The saga takes place near Lagarfljót in the east of Iceland about 1000 AD.

- "The story of the two Helges," in Origines islandicae; a collection of the more important sagas and other native writings relating to the settlement and early history of Iceland (1905). Edited and translated by Gudbrand Vigfusson and F. York Powell.
- "A legend of Shetland from Fljótsdæla Saga," translated by W. G. Collingwood. In: Old-lore miscellany of Orkney, Shetland, Caitness and Sutherland (1907), Viking Society for Northern Research.

Dryden, John. John Dryden (1631–1700) was an English poet, literary critic, translator, and playwright who was appointed England's first Poet Laureate in 1668.

- Fables ancient and modern; translated into verse, from Homer, Ovid, Boccace, and Chaucer: with original poems (1721). The third edition of Dryden's 1700 work Fables ancient and modern.
- Dryden's Palamon and Arcite; or The Knight's tale from Chaucer (1899). A Dryden translation, Palamon and Arcite, from his Fables, Ancient and Modern. Edited with notes and an introduction by Percival Ashley Chubb (1860–1959).
- Poetical Miscellanies, The Sixth Part (1709) by Alexander Pope. An edition of Poetical Miscellanies, The Sixth Part by Alexander Pope. Edited by J. Dryden.

Duff, Edward Gordon. Edward Gordon Duff (16 February 1863 – 28 September 1924) was a British bibliographer and librarian known for his works on early English printing.

- Fifteenth century English books; a bibliography of books and documents printed in England and of books for the English market printed abroad (1917), by E. Gordon Duff.

Dunstan. Dunstan (c. 909 – 19 May 988), was Archbishop of Canterbury who restored monastic life in England and reformed the English Church.

- "Dunstan's saga," in: Icelandic sagas and other historical documents relating to the settlements and descents of the Northmen on the British Isles (1894), IV, pgs. 397–420. (Icelandic version in Volume II. Translated by George Webbe Dasent.

Durantis, Gulielmus. Gulielmus Durantis (Guillaume Durand, (c. 1230 – 1 November 1296) was a French canonist and liturgical writer, and Bishop of Mende.

- The symbolism of churches and church ornaments: a translation of the first book of the Rationale Divinorum Officiorum, written by William Durandus (1843); with an introductory essay, notes and illustrations by John Mason Neale and Benjamin Webb.
- Durandus on the sacred vestments; an English rendering of the third book of the 'Rationale divinorum officiorum' of Durandus (1899). With notes, by the Rev. T. H. Passmore.

== Source material ==
- Cambrian register
- Fifteenth annual report of the Dante Society
- Palestine Pilgrims' Text Society (PPTS), Library of
- Twenty-fourth annual report of the Dante Society
- Woodbrooke Studies: Christian Documents in Syriac, Arabic, and Garshūni
- Yale Studies in English
- Y Cymmrodor

== See also ==
- Annals
- Arabic literature
- Islamic literature
- Medieval literature
