= Four Daughters of God =

Medieval personification of virtues

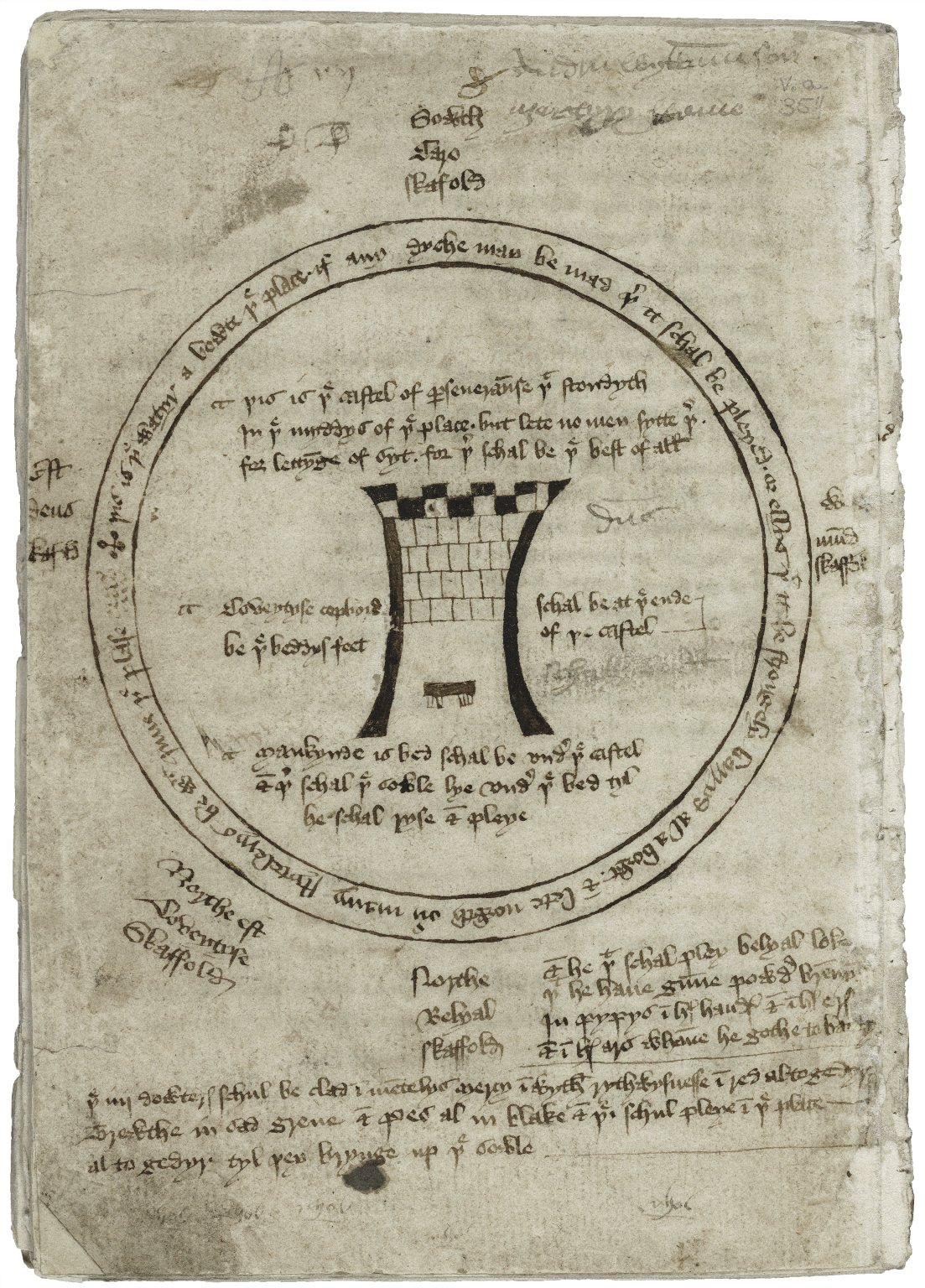
A page from the Macro Manuscript showing a staging plan for The Castle of Perseverance. The text at the bottom explains the position and costume of the Four Daughters of God

The Four Daughters of God are a personification of the virtues of Truth, Righteousness/Justice, Mercy, and Peace in medieval Catholic religious writing.

== History and development of the motif ==
The most important contributors to the development and circulation of the motif were the twelfth-century monks Hugh of St Victor and Bernard of Clairvaux, followed by the Meditations on the Life of Christ, which Bernard's text inspired.

The motif is rooted in Psalm 85:10, 'Mercy and Truth are met together; righteousness and peace have kissed each other'. The use in Christian thought seems to have been inspired an eleventh-century Jewish Midrash, in which Truth, Justice, Mercy and Peace were the four standards of the Throne of God.

The motif was influential in European thought. In 1274–76, Magnus VI of Norway introduced the first "national" law-code for Norway, known now as Magnus Lagabøtes landslov. Chapter 4.18 of the code, which was key to introducing a new model of procedural law to Norway and was to be read out to judges, makes prominent use of the allegorical four daughters of God: Mercy, Truth, Justice, and Peace. They have the important role there of expressing the idea—which was innovative in the Norwegian legal system at the time—of equality before the law.

The motif changed and developed in later medieval literature, but the usual form was a debate between the daughters (sometimes in the presence of God)

about the wisdom of creating humanity and about the propriety of strict justice or mercy for the fallen human race. Justice and Truth appear for the prosecution, representing the old Law, while Mercy speaks for the defense, and Peace presides over their reconciliation when Mercy prevails.

However, some versions (notably Robert Grosseteste's Chasteu d'amour, the Cursor Mundi, the English Gesta Romanorum, and The Court of Sapience)

develop it along the lines of a medieval romance. They place the story in a feudal setting and give to a great king four daughters, a son, and a faithless servant. Because of a misdemeanor the servant has been thrown into prison. The daughters beg for his release. The son offers to take upon himself the clothing of the servant and to suffer in his stead. Except for the element of the dispute and the method of reconciliation, the two main traditions in the development of the allegory are vastly different.

== Influence ==
The motif fell out of fashion in the seventeenth century. It may nonetheless have influenced the work of William Blake.

== Examples ==
In English and Scottish literature, the Four Daughters appear quite widely, for example in:

- Robert Grosseteste's Chasteu d'amour (thirteenth century), translated into Middle English as The King and his Four Daughters.
- the Cursor Mundi (c. 1300) lines 9517-52
- the English Gesta Romanorum (thirteenth- or fourteenth-century), number 55
- The Court of Sapience, book 1
- Piers Plowman (later fourteenth century), where they appear just after Christ's death (passus 18 in the B-text, passus 21 in the C-text). This seems to be based on Grosseteste's text.
- Nicholas Love's The Mirror of the Blessed Life of Jesus Christ (translated from the Meditations on the Life of Christ)
- John Lydgate's Life of Our Lady (fifteenth-century)
- Walter Kennedy's The Passioun of Crist (fifteenth-century)
- The Life of the Virgin Mary and the Christ (fifteenth century)
- Jacob's Well (fifteenth-century), exempla
- the N-Town Plays (fifteenth century), in "The Parliament in Heaven and the Annunciation"
- play Mankind (fifteenth century), lines 832–82, where Truth and Mercy are male
- the Castle of Perseverance (fifteenth century), appearing in line 3130, before the allegorical character Humanum Genus is admitted to heaven
- at the royal entry of Margaret of Anjou into Leadenhall at her coronation in 1445, Margaret was portrayed as Grace, reigning over Truth, Mercy, Justice, and Peace
- the Processus Satanae ('trial of Satan', sixteenth century), where God calls upon Peace and Mercy to debate with Justice and Truth.

The Four Daughters also appear in visual depictions, particularly in Books of Hours, usually in the Annunciation section. 'Justice is generally represented with scales or a sword; Peace with a palm, inverted torch, or truncated sword; Truth with a carpenter's square or tables of the Law; and Mercy with a box of ointment.'
