= N-Town Plays =

15th-century mystery plays

The N-Town Plays (also called the Hegge Cycle and the Ludus Coventriae cycle) are a cycle of 42 medieval Mystery plays from between 1450 and 1525.

== The manuscript ==
The manuscript is now housed in the British Library, London (BL MS Cotton Vespasian D.8). As its name might suggest, though, it was once the property of the 17th-century antiquarian Sir Robert Bruce Cotton and was housed in his large library. Cotton's librarian, Richard James, quickly examined the manuscript and erroneously assumed that it contained the Biblical plays performed in Coventry during the 15th and 16th centuries, thus naming them the Ludus Coventriae or "the Play Called Corpus Christi". He was mistaken in both cases, but that mistake has proven very difficult to correct; the name Ludus Coventriae persists in the secondary and critical literature well into the 20th century. A further complication of the N-Town plays was made by Hardin Craig who, in his Medieval Drama (1955), called the collection the Hegge Plays after their former owner, Robert Hegge. The name Hegge Plays only briefly caught on, and the most common way to refer to these plays now is The N-Town Plays, after the reference in the last stanza of the opening proclamation that the play was to be played at "N-Town". When the plays toured from town to town, N. (standing for nomen, Latin for 'name') would be replaced by the name of the town the cycle was playing in at any given time.

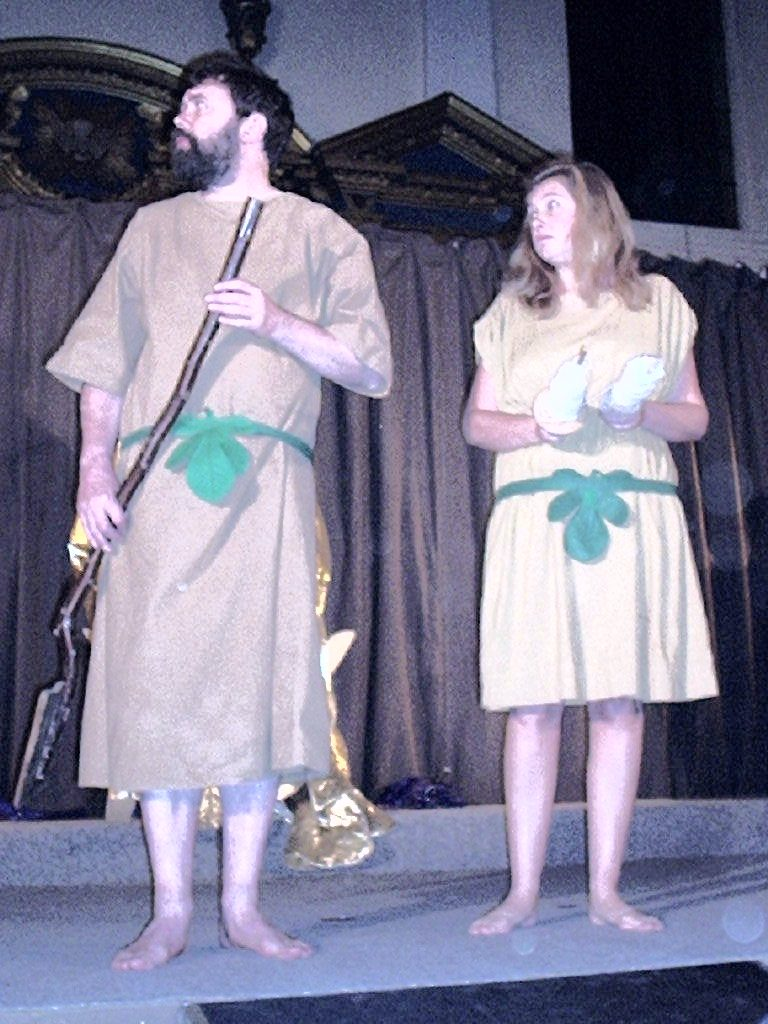
Adam and Eve are expelled from Paradise in 'The Fall of Man' from the N-Town plays, as performed by the Players of St Peter in St Clement Eastcheap, London, 2004

The plays of the N-Town cycle vary from simple, almost liturgical, recitations of Biblical texts (as in the Moses play of the Ten Commandments, the Jesse play with its kings and prophets, and the Pentecost play) to highly complex and fast moving short dramas on Biblical themes that have a naturalism and liveliness (as in the Death of Herod and the Woman Taken in Adultery) almost unique in early drama. These plays can all be played from a wagon or a single booth stage. On the other hand, the two Mary Plays and the Passion Play were written for what is often called "place and scaffold" production in the round using "scaffolds" or raised stages and also the "platea" or the "place" between the stages.

The true nature of the manuscript has been hidden by the fact that the scribe arranged all the episodes in "chronological order" starting with Creation and ending with Judgment, simulating an episodic play presenting salvation history as in the two northern civic cycles from York and Chester. As he did this he buried the Mary Play inside the Nativity sequence and copied the Passion Play into place between the Raising of Lazarus and the Resurrection appearances. It has taken painstaking paleographic and codicologic examinations of the manuscript to determine what the scribe actually did. To further complicate the matter, at some point in the history of copying out these plays, the proclamation was attached to them. Although the proclamation does not match the plays that follow, someone, possibly the scribe of this manuscript, placed numbers in the margin of the text against incidents that correspond to the description of the "pageants" in the proclamation. This does not affect the single episode pageants but it breaks up the flow of the Passion Play and has obscured the very existence of the Mary Play for centuries.

A final scribal feature of this manuscript is the stage directions which reflect a curious mixture of intent. They seem to be recording performance detail while, at the same time, facilitating the reading of the manuscript as a meditation text rather than using it as a text to be enacted. The stage directions are in Latin in the pageants, in the Mary Play they are a mix of English and Latin and in the Passion Play they are almost entirely in English. They seem to function as much as an aid to help a reader visualise the action as actual practical instructions to a director. The details of costume and action in the stage directions in the Passion Play suggest a description of an actual performance. The liturgical music is specified in the Mary Play and Assumption Play by including the opening words of each piece or the "incipit" in the stage directions. On the other hand, the stage directions in many of the pageants are quite laconic.

== Location ==
All scholars who have worked with this manuscript agree that it belongs in the east Midlands. Some attempt has been made to place it as far north as Lincoln (it was even called the Lincoln cycle by some scholars for a period and is still performed in the shadow of Lincoln Cathedral), but the general consensus places the manuscript in East Anglia. Stephen Spector cautiously writes "The linguistic evidence indicates that the codex was recorded principally or exclusively by scribes trained in East Anglia" (Spector, xxix) Meredith more positively asserts that The Mary Play comes from Norfolk (Meredith, 6). However, since the eclectic nature of the MS. has been recognised, scholars have been hesitant to insist that all the plays copied into this anthology were played in the same place.

== Date ==
The date "1468" appears in the hand of the major scribe at the end of the Purification play (f 100v). This, then, is the earliest possible date for the copying of the text. Spector has concluded on the basis of dialectal evidence that the plays cannot predate 1425 and on the basis of the watermarks on the paper that the paper used by the main scribe comes from the period 1460–77. It is possible, again on the basis of the paper, that the Assumption play, written separately by a different scribe and bound into the main MS., was copied slightly earlier. We are safe to assume that the MS. dates from the second half of the third quarter (ca. 1463–75) of the 15th century. This makes it the oldest MS. to contain a large number of Biblical plays. Although we know there were plays performed elsewhere from the late 14th century, the York manuscript was written down in the 1470s, the Towneley MS. after the turn of the 16th century and all the versions of the Chester plays after 1596.

== Sources of the plays ==
The majority of the plays that make up the N-Town Cycle are based (some rather tenuously) on the Bible, while the others are taken from Roman Catholic legend, apocryphal sources and folk tradition. The Parliament of Heaven is based on just one verse from a psalm. The Marian plays place a strong emphasis on the early life of the Virgin, as well as on the relationship between her and Joseph (which plays heavily upon the popular medieval old man with a younger wife trope). The Trial of Mary and Joseph play has been identified as a pastiche of the East Anglian ecclesiastical court system.

- The Proclamation of the Banns
- Play 1: Creation of Heaven & Fall of the Rebel Angels
- Play 2: Creation of World & Fall of Adam and Eve
- Play 3: Cain and Abel
- Play 4: Noah's Flood
- Play 5: Abraham's Sacrifice of Isaac
- Play 6: Moses and the Ten Commandments
- Play 7: The Root of Jesse: Prophecies of the Savior
- Play 8: Joachim and Anna & the Conception of Mary
- Play 9: Joachim and Anne's Presentation of Mary at the Temple
- Play 10: The Marriage of Mary and Joseph
- Play 11: The Parliament in Heaven and the Annunciation (the first part being a debate between the Four Daughters of God)
- Play 12: Joseph's Doubt About Mary
- Play 13: Mary's Visit to Elizabeth
- Play 14: The Trial of Mary and Joseph
- Play 15: The Nativity
- Play 16: The Annunciation to and Visitation of the Shepherds
- Play 17: (No play)
- Play 18: The Adoration of the Magi
- Play 19: The Purification
- Play 20: Massacre of the Innocents
- Play 21: Christ and the Doctors in the Temple
- Play 22: The Baptism of Christ
- Play 23: The Parliament in Hell and the Temptation in the Desert
- Play 24: The Woman taken in adultery
- Play 25: The Raising of Lazarus
- Play 26: The First Passion Play: Lucifer and John the Baptist; Conspiracy Against Christ; Entry into Jerusalem
- Play 27: The Last Supper
- Play 28: Agony in the Garden & the Arrest of Christ
- Play 29: Christ's Passion: Herod's Boasting; Trial Before Annas & Caiphas
- Play 30: Death of Judas & Trials Before Pilate and Herod
- Play 31: Pilate's Wife, and the Second Trial Before Pilate
- Play 32: Procession to Calvary & Crucifixion of Christ
- Play 33: The Harrowing of Hell
- Play 34: Burial of Christ & Guarding of the Sepulchre
- Play 35: The Harrowing of Hell, B; Christ's Appearance to Mary; Pilate Berates the Soldiers
- Play 36: The Three Marys at the Tomb of Christ
- Play 37: Christ's Appearance to Mary Magdalene
- Play 38: Christ's Appearance to Cleophas, Luke, and Thomas
- Play 39: The Ascension of Christ & the Selection of Matthias
- Play 40: Pentecost
- Play 41: Assumption of Mary Into Heaven
- Play 42: Last Judgment

== Editions of the plays ==
Some recent published editions of the N-town plays include:

1. The N-Town Play: Cotton MS Vespasian D. 8. 2 vols. Ed. Stephen Spector. Oxford: Published for the Early English Text Society by the Oxford University Press, 1991.
2. The Passion Play from the N-Town Manuscript, ed. Peter Meredith. Harlow: Longman, 1990
3. The Mary Play from the N-Town Manuscript, ed, Peter Meredith. Harlow: Longamn, 1987.

A facsimile of the manuscript from the British Library was also published: The N-Town Plays: a facsimile of British Library MS Cotton Vespasian D VIII. Ed. Peter Meredith and Stanley J. Kahrl. Leeds: University of Leeds School of English, 1977.

== Modern revival ==
The Lincoln Mystery Plays are modern performances of medieval mystery plays and other productions in Lincoln Cathedral and the surrounding area.

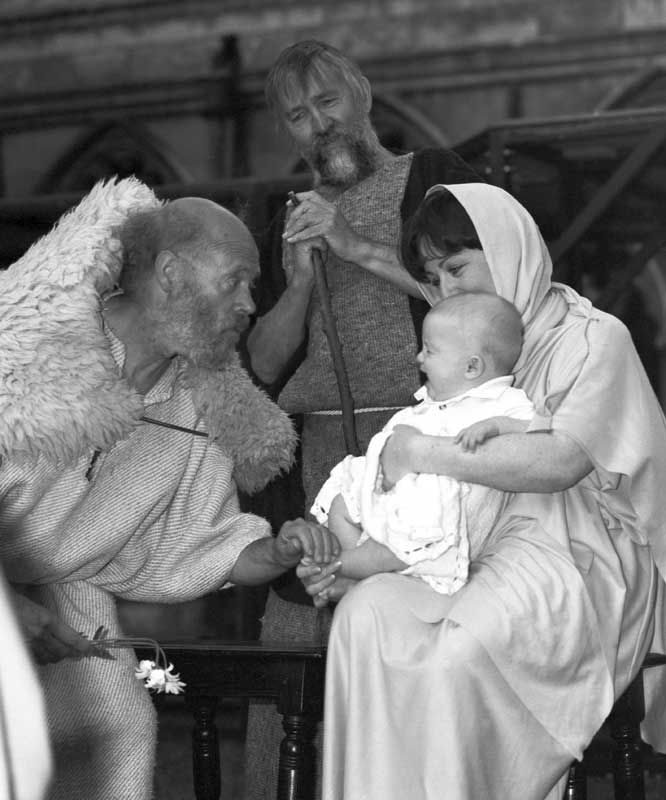
1997 performance of Adoration of the Shepherds

The Lincoln Mystery Plays are based on the N-Town Plays.

Keith Ramsay (b.1933-d.2021) was head of drama at Bishop Grosseteste College during the 1970s. In 1974, Ramsay directed the Oberfuer Cycle. In 1978, he formed the ‘Lincoln Mystery Plays Company’ and he directed the productions every four years between 1978 and 2000 of the Lincoln Mystery Plays.

The plays are performed in Lincoln Cathedral and Southwell Minster. There are occasionally other performances. For example, in 2003, Mister Wesley, a new play by Roy Clarke, was performed in Lincoln and Southwell. In 2014, "The Last Post" was performed by the Lincoln Mystery Plays company at The Drill Hall, based on the true story of the eight local Beechey brothers, five of whom were killed in World War I. This was then followed in 2018, at the Lincoln Drill Hall, by "The World at her Feet" by Steve Gillard, marking the 100th anniversary of WW1, about women's football in Lincoln during the war years.

=== Format ===
The Mystery Plays tell stories from the Bible as seen through the eyes of a person from the Middle Ages. The plays are usually set between the birth of Christ and his crucifixion. The plays were written in middle English, the language of the ordinary people of that time. These guild productions flourished over 200 years in English cities until Cromwell and the Protestant Reformation ended the tradition.

=== Revival ===
Mary (Louie Ramsay) and Jesus (Neil Perkins) in a 1994 performance of The Deposition

The plays were almost forgotten for hundreds of years. The first major revival was in 1951 in York by E Martin Brown. In 1969 a production of "The Lincoln Cycle of Mystery Plays" was performed at the Cathedral in conjunction with Lincoln Theatre Royal. Adapted from a translation by Martial Rose. First performance was 23 August 1969. Principal actors were Brian Tree, Brian Protheroe and Alison Steadman. The production was directed by Clare Venables and assisted by Rhys McConnochie.

In 1978, Ramsay revived the Lincoln or N-Town Plays plays in Lincoln. He directed nine productions in Lincoln Cathedral and two in Southwell Minster. Ramsay was invited to present the production at several international conferences on medieval drama. The company performed in Neustadt, Germany; Viterbo, Rome & Camerino Italy; Perpignan, France and Oregon, in the United States in 1989. States.

2000 was Ramsay's last production of the Mystery Plays: 2004 saw Karen Crow directing, 2008's production was directed by Geoff Readman, the 2012 production was directed by John Bowtell, 2016 by Colin Brimblecombe.

In 2011 Lincoln Theatre Royal hosted a gala performance to raise funds for the 2012 production, directed by Angela Gunstone, with performances by actors from 1969 to 2008.
