= The Castle of Perseverance =

15th-century morality play

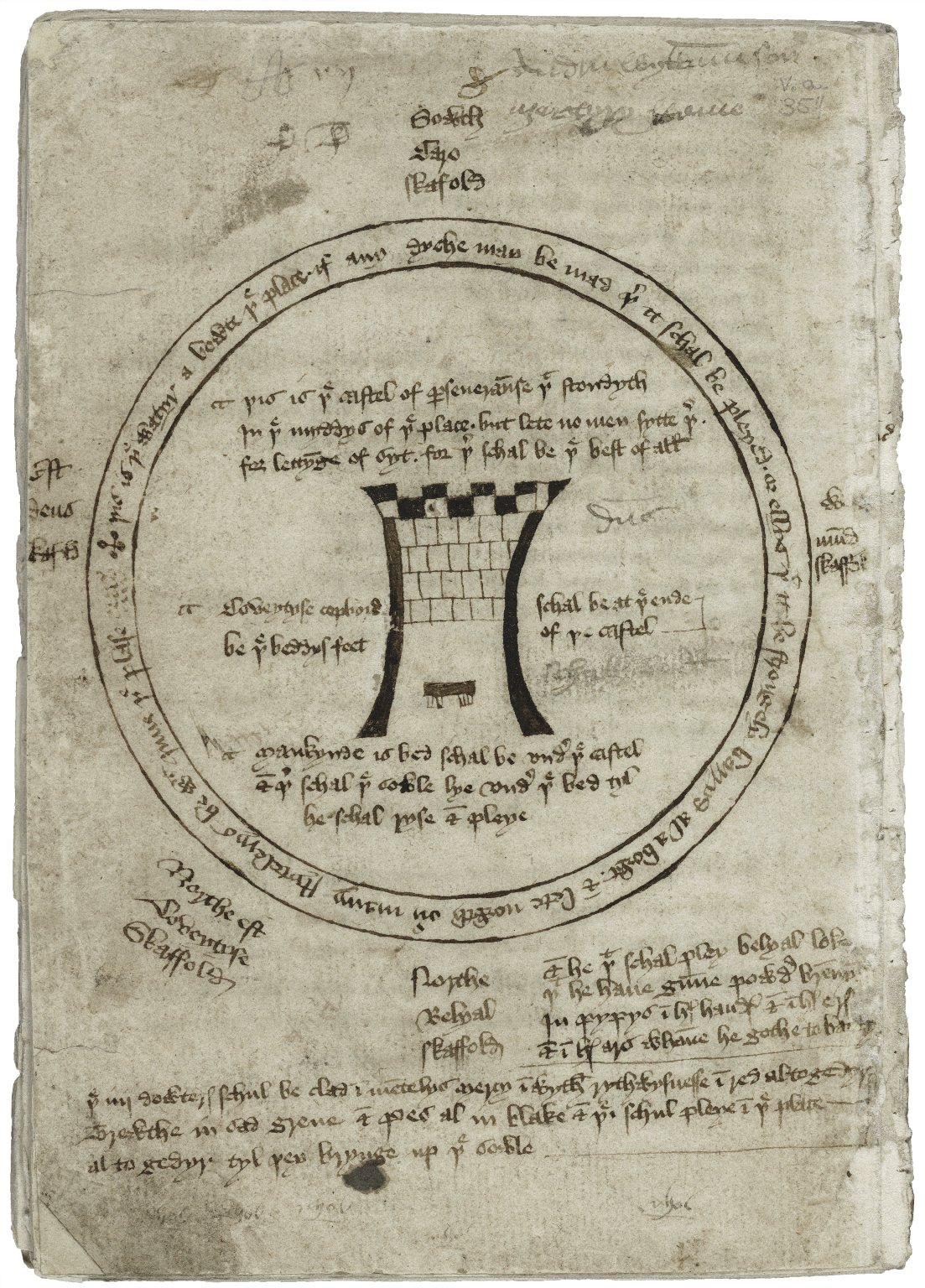
- Stage drawing from the only surviving manuscript of The Castle of Perseverance
- Original language: Middle English
- Written by: Anonymous
- Characters: Mankind Belial (The Devil); World; Good Angel; Bad Angel; Seven deadly sins (Pride, Anger [Wrath], Envy, Gluttony, Lechery, Sloth, Greed [Covetousness]); Seven virtues (Humility [Meekness], Patience, Charity, Abstinence, Chastity, Industry, Generosity); Death; The Father (God); Pleasure (Lust-Liker); Folly; The Boy; Flesh; Backbiter; Confession (Shrift); Penance; The Soul; The Daughters of God (Mercy, Truth, Justice [Righteousness], Peace); First Standard-Bearer Second Standard-Bearer
- Mute: Business
- Genre: morality play

Premiere
- Date: 1405-25

The Castle of Perseverance is a c. 15th-century morality play and the earliest known full-length (3,649 lines) vernacular play in existence. Along with Mankind and Wisdom, The Castle of Perseverance is preserved in the Macro Manuscript (named after its owner Cox Macro) that is now housed in the Folger Shakespeare Library in Washington, D.C. The Castle of Perseverance contains nearly all of the themes found in other morality plays, but it is especially important (and unusual) because a stage drawing is included, which may suggest theatre in the round.

== Synopsis ==
This morality play traces the entire life of its hero Humanum Genus (Mankind) as he wages a fluctuating battle with evil forces. As the play begins, Mankind ignores the counsel of his Good Angel and allows his Bad Angel to lead him into the service of World. World’s servants (Lust and Folly) dress the hero in expensive clothes and lead him to the scaffold of Covetousness, where Mankind accepts the Seven Deadly Sins. All is not lost, though, for Shrift and Penance convince Mankind to repent and he is placed in the Castle of Perseverance where he will be protected from sin by the Seven Moral Virtues. Mankind's enemies (World, Flesh, and the Devil) attack the castle but are repulsed by the Virtues armed with roses (emblems of Christ’s Passion). Next, Covetousness tempts Mankind with an offer of wealth, and Mankind thinks about accepting. At this point, Mankind is struck down by a dart thrown by Death, illustrating that death may strike at any moment. As he dies, Mankind prays that God will deliver his soul from Hell. The Four Daughters of God (drawn from a medieval tradition) debate Mankind’s fate, and, in the end, God sides with Mercy and Peace (over Righteousness and Truth) and decides to pardon Mankind. The actor playing God ends the play with the admonishment,

“Thus endyth oure gamys!
To save you fro synnynge,
Evyr at the begynnynge
Thynke on youre last endynge!”

In Modern English:

“Thus ends our games!
To save you from sinning,
Forever from the beginning
Think on your last ending!”

== History ==
The Castle of Perseverance manuscript in the Macro MS dates to around 1440, but certain textual errors suggest that this version was copied from an earlier manuscript. Dialectic particularities in the playtext show that it was composed in the first quarter of the 15th century, in the East Midlands, probably around Norfolk. The play contains a reference to "crakows", the pointed ends of shoes that were popular in this time period. There are six other references to crakows in the literature of this period, dating between 1382 and 1425. Scholars therefore set 1425 as the latest possible date of composition. Stylistic differences in dialect, rhyme scheme and stanza pattern between the banns (an advertisement for the coming performance that begins the play) and certain sections of the play text lead to the argument that the play may have had two or even three authors.

Along with The Castle of Perseverance, the Reverend Cox Macro of Bury St Edmunds, Suffolk acquired Mankind and Wisdom in the early 18th century. Macro bound the three manuscripts together somewhat arbitrarily, along with three other manuscripts. Early 19th-century owner Henry Gurney separated The Castle, Wisdom, and Mankind from the other manuscripts and bound them together as a collection in a separate volume, now known as "the Macro Manuscript". In August 1936, Joseph Quincy Adams, the Director of the Folger Shakespeare Library, purchased this manuscript along with Mankind and Wisdom from the antiquarian firm Bernard Quaritch Ltd for £1,125 (approximately $5,625).[4] The manuscripts had been purchased by Quaritch earlier in 1936 at a Sotheby's auction on March 30 for £440.

The manuscript has 38 extant leaves, with two leaves missing, meaning that some 100 lines that have been lost. The full performance would have required about three and a half hours and upwards of twenty actors. The large size of the cast required suggests that the play was performed by traveling players in the speaking roles, with locals acting the mute minor roles.

== Drawing ==
The earliest drawing of a stage and set design in England, along with the earliest known written reference to theatrical props, is preserved in the manuscript. In the centre of the drawing is the castle from the play's title. The writing above the castle explicitly says that the audience should not sit in the area. At the base of the castle is a bed on which Mankind rests. The circle around the castle is labelled as a ditch, which the audience should not cross.

The five short text blocks around the circle label scaffolds for some of the characters, including God, Belial, and World. The map is oriented with north towards the bottom, which suggests that it is not merely some abstract suggestion by the playwright or scribe, but rather a real set design that may have been implemented.

Whether the drawing truly represents theatre in the round or not is debatable. Although the ditch circles the castle completely and it is stated that the audience should not cross it, nowhere does the text state that the audience should sit on all sides of the play. It is possible that they sat on only one or some of the sides.

== Themes ==
The Castle of Perseverance shows the progression of Mankind from birth to death, illustrating his temptations and the process necessary for Christian salvation. The play pictures men in this world as besieged on all sides by sin with the only comfort and salvation coming from virtues. The play is allegorical battle between good and evil over the soul of humankind. The two sides are equal, with 15 good characters balanced against 15 bad characters.
