= Macro Manuscript =

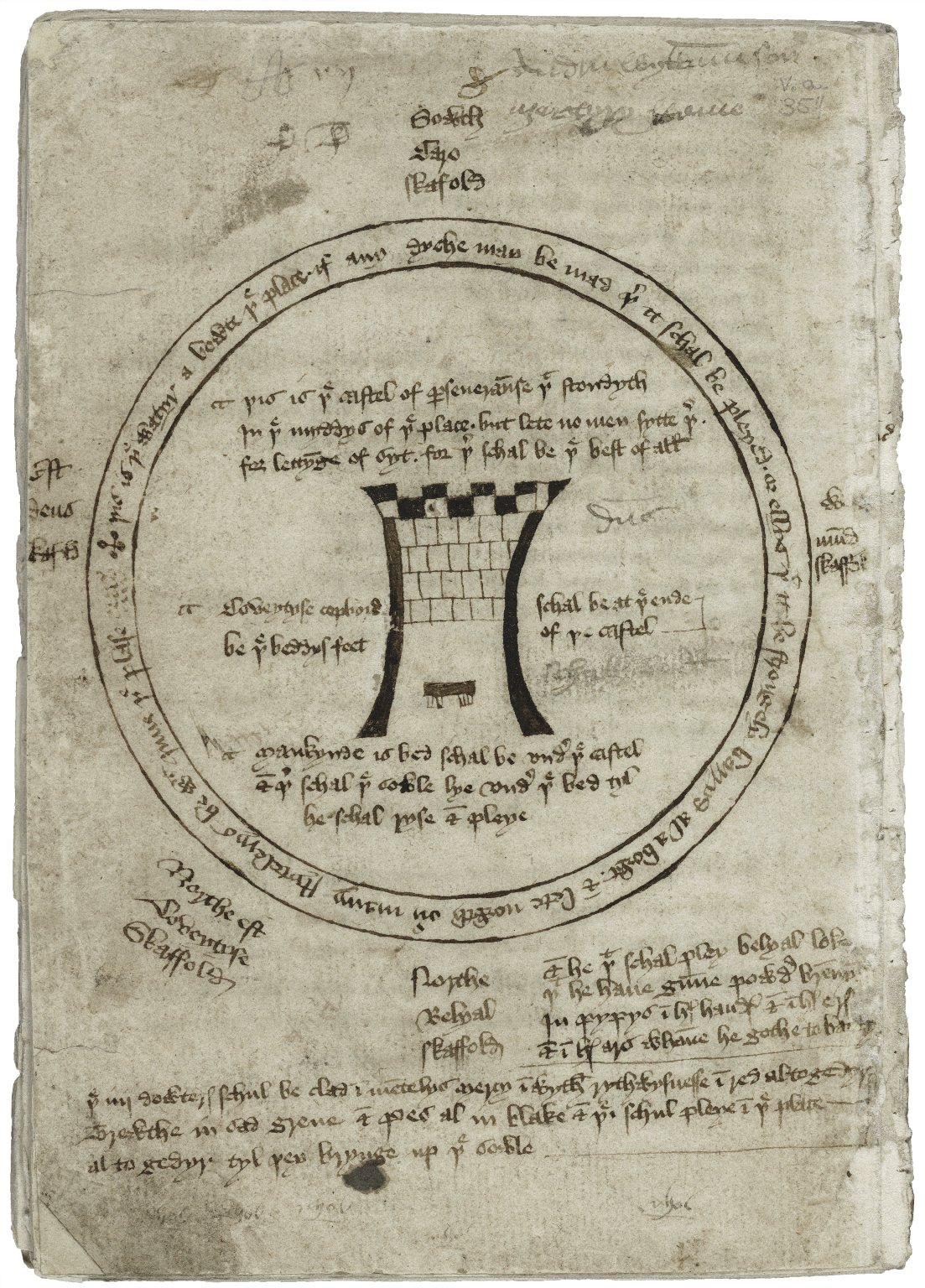
Castle of Perseverance staging diagram

The Macro Manuscript is a collection of three 15th-century English morality plays, known as the "Macro plays" or "Macro moralities": Mankind, The Castle of Perseverance, and Wisdom. So named for its 18th-century owner Reverend Cox Macro (1683–1767), the manuscript contains the earliest complete examples of English morality plays. A stage plan attached to The Castle of Perseverance is also the earliest known staging diagram in England. The manuscript is the only source for The Castle of Perseverance and Mankind and the only complete source for Wisdom. The Macro Manuscript is a part of the collection at the Folger Shakespeare Library in Washington, D.C. (MS. V.a. 354). For centuries, scholars have studied the Macro Manuscript for insights into medieval drama. As Clifford Davidson writes in Visualizing the Moral Life, "in spite of the fact that the plays in the manuscript are neither written by a single scribe nor even attributed to a single date, they collectively provide our most important source for understanding the fifteenth century English morality play."

== History and provenance ==
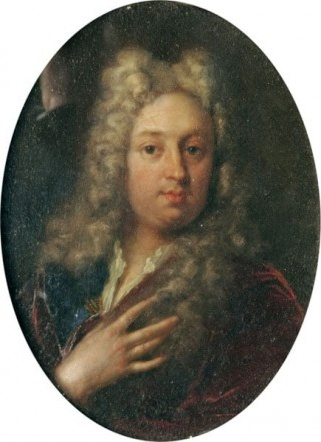
Early-18th-century antiquarian Cox Macro collected the plays and bound them together as one manuscript (portrait by Frans van Mieris the Younger, now at Norwich Castle Museum)

Although the manuscript is now considered a single artifact, its three plays were composed as separate manuscripts. Along with certain place names scattered throughout the plays, the particular dialects in which the three are written suggest that they originated in the East Midlands or East Anglia, particularly around Norfolk and Suffolk. The monk Thomas Hyngman transcribed Mankind and Wisdom between 1460 and 1475. Along with The Castle of Perseverance, Hyngman's Mankind and Wisdom were acquired by the Reverend Cox Macro of Bury St Edmunds, Suffolk in the early 18th century. Macro bound them together somewhat arbitrarily, along with three other non-dramatic manuscripts. Early 19th-century owner Henry Gurney separated The Castle, Wisdom, and Mankind from the other manuscripts and bound them together as a collection in a separate volume. In August of 1936, Joseph Quincy Adams, the Director of the Folger Shakespeare Library, purchased this manuscript from the antiquarian firm Bernard Quaritch for £1,125 (approximately $5,625). The manuscripts had been purchased by Quaritch earlier in 1936 at a Sotheby's auction on March 30 for £440.

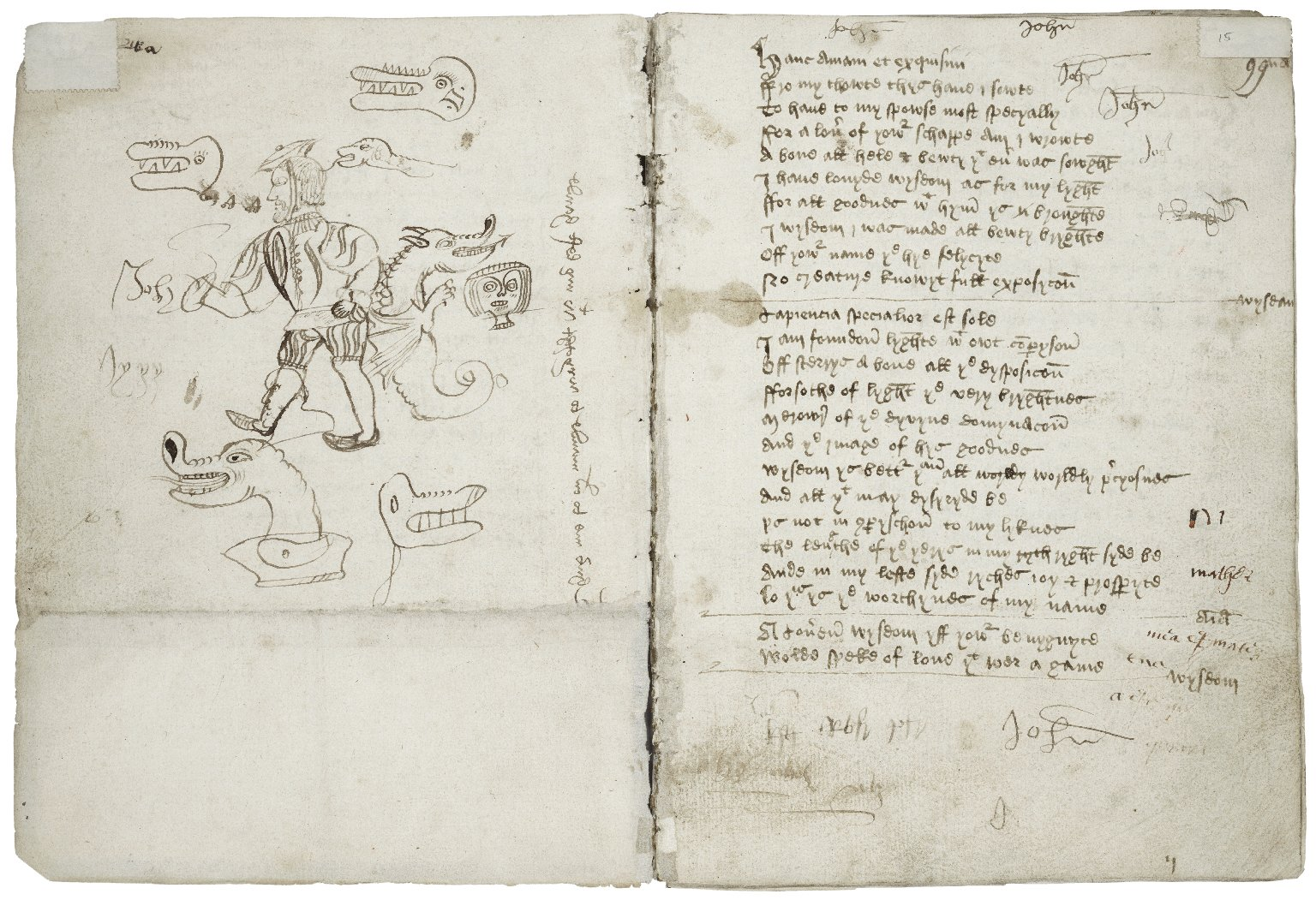
A page from Wisdom in the Macro Manuscript

As drama, the Macro plays remained in relative obscurity until 1823, when William Hone mentioned The Castle of Perseverance in Ancient Mysteries Described. The first intensive critical analysis came in 1832 from John Payne Collier in The History of English Dramatic Poetry. The three plays were first published together in Furnivall's edition of 1882.

== Plays ==
=== The Castle of Perseverance ===
References in The Castle of England to "crakows" (an early 15th-century shoe fashion with pointed toes) indicate that the play was written between 1400 and 1425, making it the earliest complete extant English morality play. The Macro manuscript's Castle was transcribed around 1440. Despite being chronologically first, the play is bound third in the Macro manuscript, in folios 154–191. The play has 38 extant leaves, with two gatherings of 16 leaves and a third gathering of six leaves, with nearly 3,700 lines in total. Evidence of two missing leaves suggests that there are around 100 lines that have been lost. Stylistic differences in dialect, rhyme scheme and stanza pattern between the banns (an advertisement for the coming performance that begins the play) and certain sections of the play text lead to the argument that the play may have had two or three authors.

The play's full performance would have required about three and a half hours and upwards of twenty actors. The large size of the cast required suggests that the play was performed by traveling players in the speaking roles with locals acting the mute minor roles.

=== Mankind ===
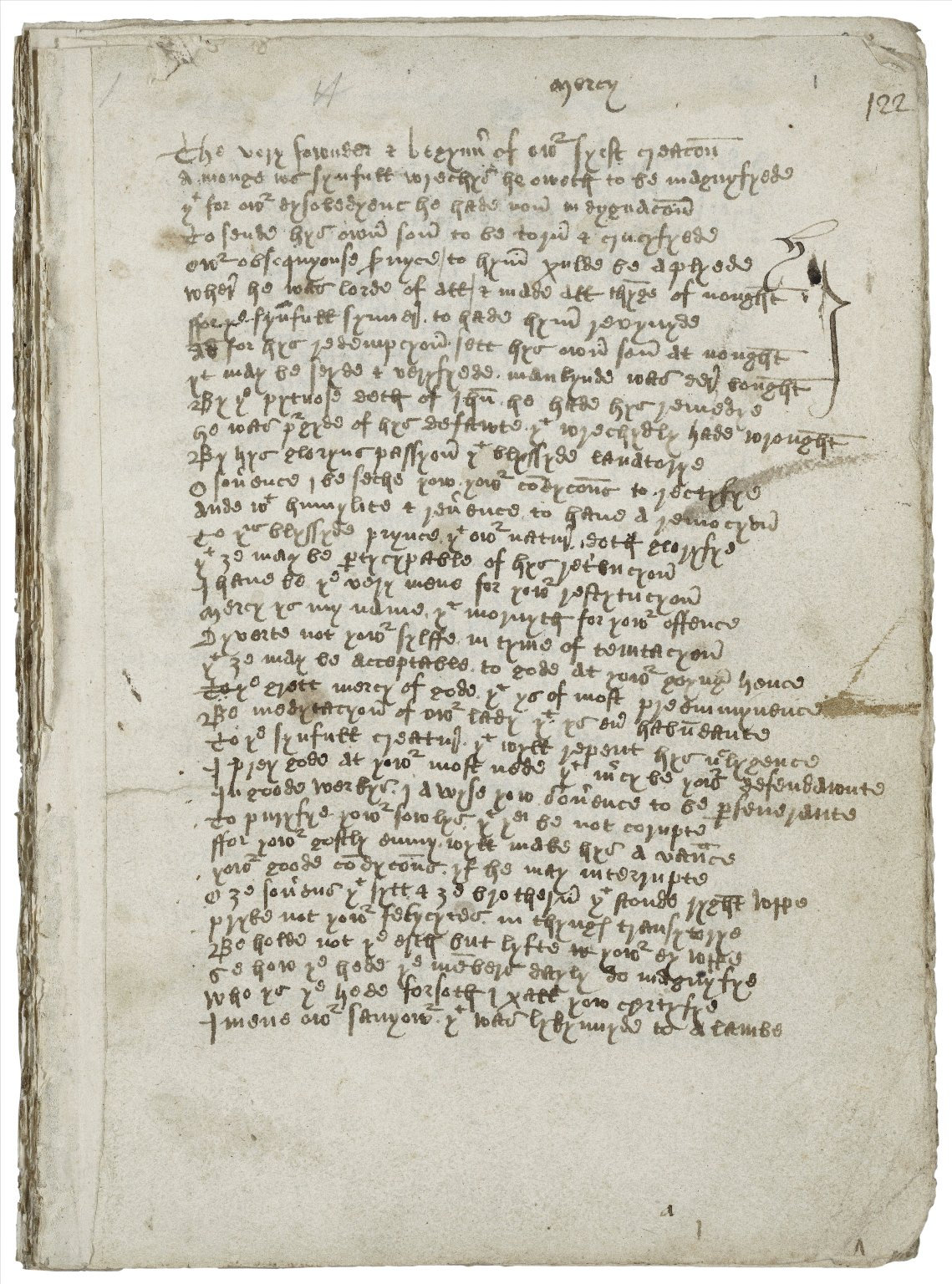
A page from Mankind in the Macro Manuscript

Through references to contemporary coinage, Mankind has been dated to 1465–1470. Thirteen extant leaves make up the manuscript. The play was performed by groups of traveling players for a paying audience; Eccles notes that Mankind is the first English play to "mention gathering money from an audience". The cast is considerably smaller than that of The Castle or Wisdom, requiring as few as six players to perform. Scholars have been interested by the contrast between serious theological material and comic moments in Mankind. The play is interested in the humor of transgression – five out of seven speaking roles are comic villains, making Mankind the lightest and most colloquial of the Macro plays. In his introduction to Furnivall's edition, Pollard writes that the "low tone" of the play is due to its nature as an economic venture, since the tone appealed to the largely uneducated common audiences for whom players performed.

=== Wisdom ===
Also known as Mind, Will, and Understanding, Wisdom dates from the mid-1460s. The manuscript contains two quires of twelve leaves each. Like Mankind, it belonged to (and was possibly transcribed by) the monk Thomas Hyngman. While the play in its complete form is known only through the Macro Manuscript, fragments of the play are preserved in the manuscript Digby 133 at the Bodleian Library. Unlike the other Macro plays, Wisdom splits the incarnation of man into nine different characters: Anima (the soul of man), the three faculties of the soul (Mind, Will, and Understanding), and the five senses. Scholars disagree on the number of players required to perform the play, varying from over twenty to as few as twelve.
