= Winchester Dialogues =

Winchester Dialogues refers to two works of Early English Drama found in Winchester College MS 33, first published by Norman Davis in 1979. Occupation and Idleness is a mid-fifteenth century interlude or play, although it is referred to as a "dialogue". Lucidus and Dubius is better described as a semi-dramatic dialogue rather than a play.

== Lucidus and Dubius ==
The following two stanzas (Lines 440 - 449) serve to provide a general description of Lucidus and Dubius.

- LUCIDUS: A, douteful Dubius, doubtful Dubius!
- The cause there-of is this.
- The first maide that ever was
- was Eve, Adamys wyf.
- Sche wrou3t the first trespas
- and made al oure wo and stryf;
- and as thurgh a mayde deth come in
- and al men were lore,
- Crist so wolde be Mary Virgyn
- alle the world restore.

=== Modern English translation ===
- LUCIDUS: Ah, doubtful Dubius, doubtful Dubius!
- The cause of that is this.
- The first virgin that ever lived
- was Eve, Adam's wife.
- She initiated the first trespass
- And caused all our anguish and strife
- and because of this virgin death will occur
- and all men were taught,
- so by the Virgin Mary Christ would
- cleanse the entire world.

== Occupation and Idleness ==
The following two stanzas (Lines 430 - 438) serve to provide a general description of Occupation and Idleness.

- OCCUPACION: Ydelnes is nat ferre, as thynkith me,
- And so Y tolde one ryght now.
- DOCTRINE: Ydelnes, where is he?
- OCCUPACION: Yonder, syr, as ye may se,
- And scorneth both me and yow.
- DOCTRINE: Ydelnes, come nere
- And lerne of me som curtesie.
- YDELNES: Y shrew me and Y come ther
- While thou art so angry.

=== Modern English translation ===
- OCCUPACION: It seems to me that Idleness is not far [away]
- And so I told you right now.
- DOCTRINE: Idleness, where is he?
- OCCUPACION: Over there, sir, as you will see,
- And scorns both you and I.
- DOCTRINE: Idleness, come here
- And learn some courtesy from me
- YDELNES: I curse myself if I [will] come to you
- While you are so angry.
