= Digby plays =

Middle English mystery plays

The Digby plays are a set of four Middle English plays from East Anglia found together in and named after the manuscript Digby 133 in the Bodleian Library. All the plays were written between about 1460 and 1550. The four plays are:

- The Conversion of Saint Paul, a saint play
- Mary Magdalene, a saint play
- Wisdom, a morality play
- Candlemas Day and the Killing of the Children of Israel, a mystery play

The first three of these were collected by Myles Blomefylde (1525–1603), whose signature appears on them. They were bound together with other material by Kenelm Digby, who gave the manuscript, now known as in Digby 133, to the Bodleian in 1634. The fourth play was added to the manuscript in the 1640s.

== See also ==
- Macro Manuscript

== Bibliography ==
- Baker, Donald C.; Murphy, John L.; Hall, Louis B. Jr., eds. (1982). The Late Medieval Religious Plays of Bodleian MSS. Digby 133 and E Museo 160. Early English Text Society, Original Series, No. 283. Oxford University Press.
- Coletti, Theresa (2006). "The Digby Plays". In David Scott Kastan (ed.). The Oxford Encyclopedia of British Literature. Oxford University Press.
- Furnivall, Frederick James, ed. (1882). The Digby Mysteries. N. Trübner & Co.
