= Wisdom (play) =

Wisdom, or Mind, Will, and Understanding
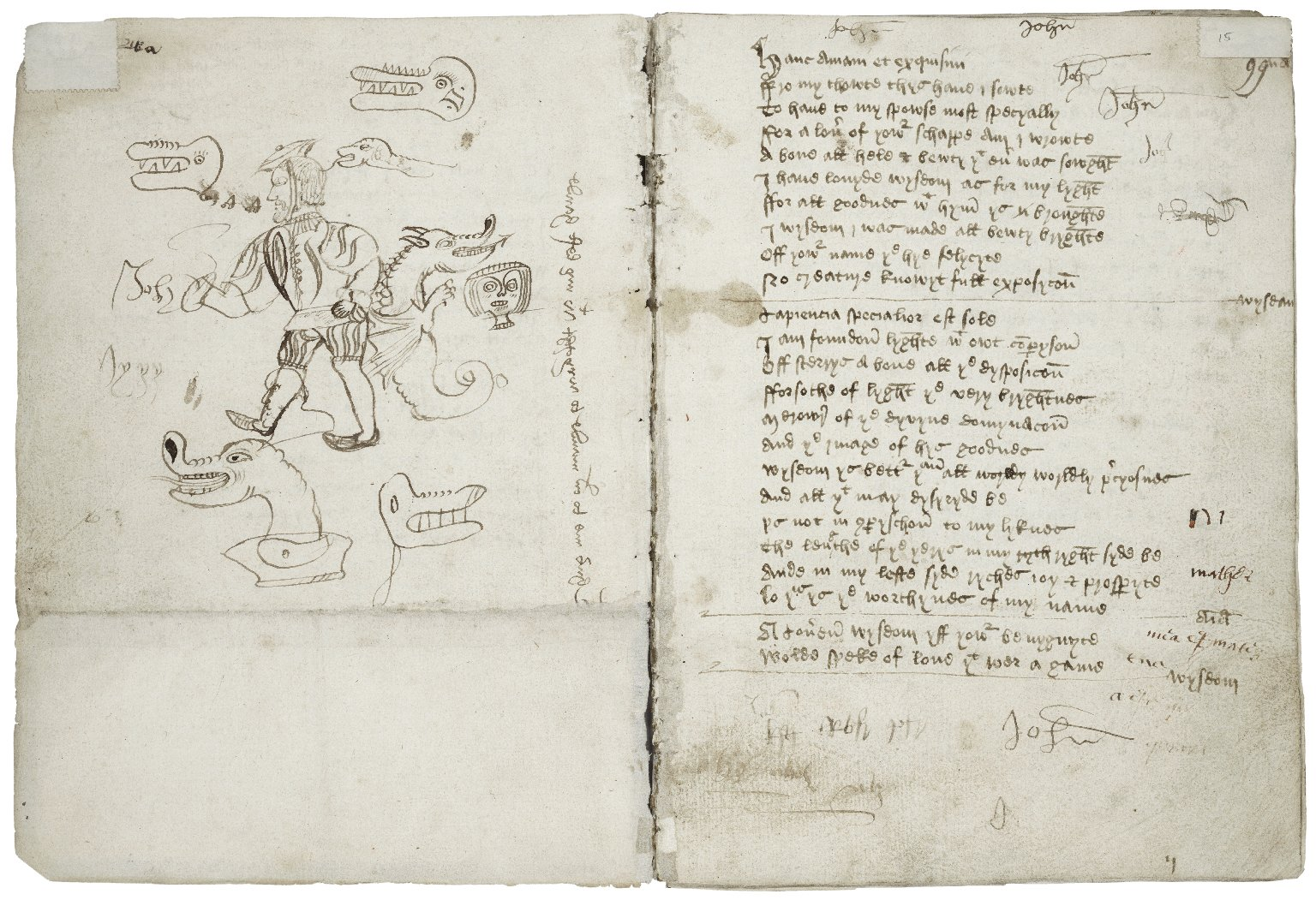
- A drawing and text from the Macro Manuscript version of Wisdom
- Original language: Middle English
- Written by: Anonymous
- Characters: Wisdom (dressed as Christ) Lucifer; Anima, the Soul; Mind; Will; Understanding The Five Wits
- Genre: morality play

Premiere
- Date: ca. 1460-1470

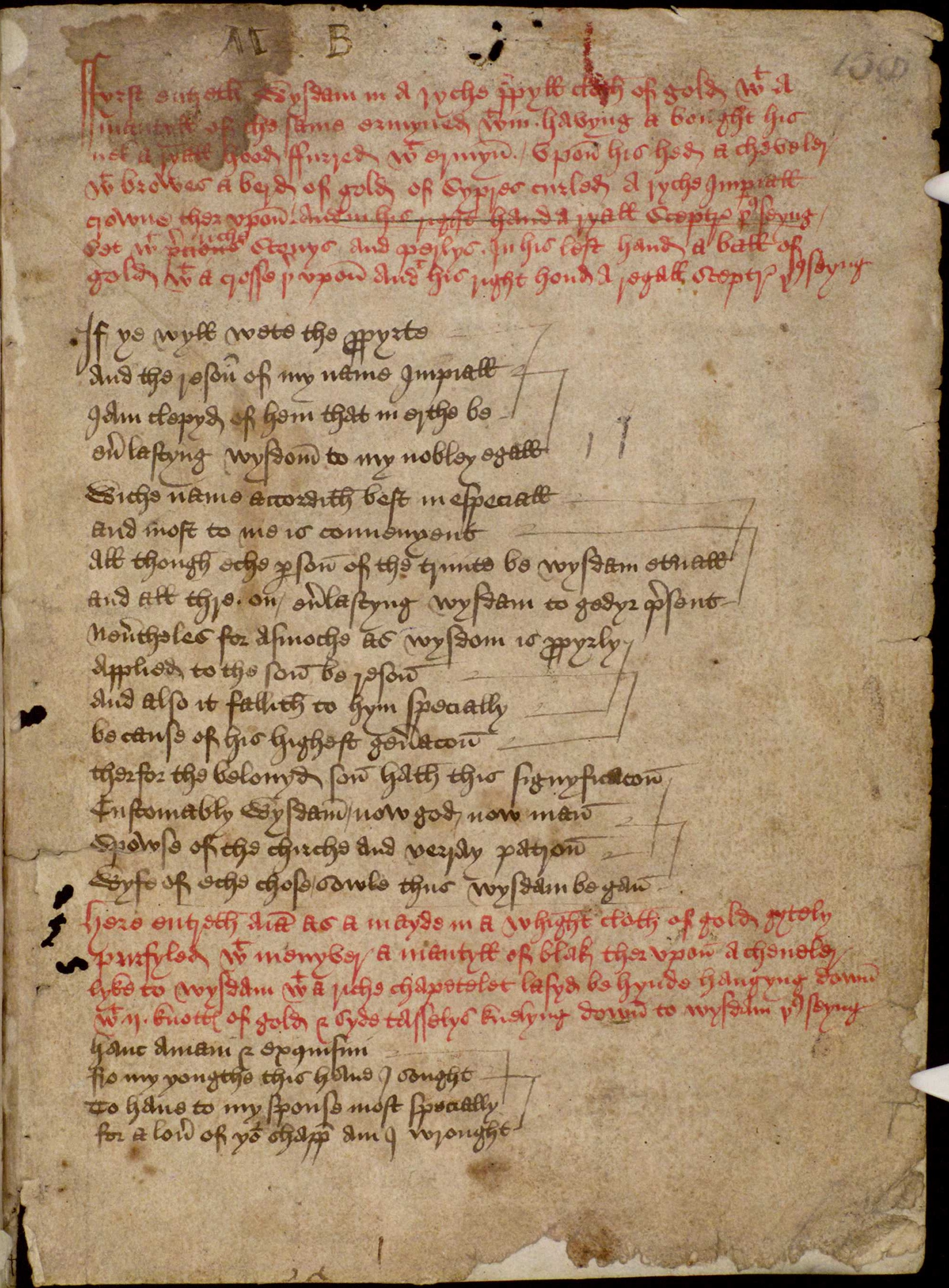
Opening page of the partial copy of Wisdom preserved in the Bodleian Library (MS Digby 133, folio 158r)

Wisdom (also known as Mind, Will, and Understanding) is one of the earliest surviving medieval morality plays. Together with Mankind and The Castle of Perseverance, it forms a collection of early English moralities called "The Macro Plays". Wisdom enacts the struggle between good and evil; as an allegory, it depicts Christ (personified in the character of Wisdom) and Lucifer battling over the Soul of Man, with Christ and goodness ultimately victorious. Dating between 1460 and 1463, the play is preserved in its complete form in the Macro Manuscript, currently a part of the collection of the Folger Shakespeare Library (MS V.a. 354). A manuscript fragment of the first 754 lines also belongs to the Bodleian Library (MS Digby 133). Although the author of Wisdom remains anonymous, the manuscript was transcribed and signed by a monk named Thomas Hyngman. Some scholars have suggested that Hyngman also authored the play.

== Synopsis ==
Unlike other early morality plays, the character signifying man is split into nine different characters: Anima (the soul of man), the three faculties of the soul (Mind, Will and Understanding), and her five senses (known as ‘’the Wits”). Despite boasting a large cast list, the only six speaking roles in the play are Anima, Wisdom, Lucifer, Mind, Will and Understanding. Although the manuscript does not contain scene demarcations, the play can be divided into four sections, based upon a theological schematic of transgression and redemption: innocence, temptation, sinful life, and repentance. In the first part (Lines 1–324), Anima declares her love for Wisdom, the allegorical figure for Christ. The stage directions note that Anima is dressed in white, a symbol of her purity and position as the bride of Christ. The five Wits enter (dressed as virgins), and dance. Wisdom advises Anima and her three faculties (Will, Mind, Understanding) about how to live virtuously. In the second part (325-550), Lucifer tempts each of the three faculties – Will with lechery, Mind with pride, and Understanding with Perjury. In the third part (551-837), each faculty (having exchanged monkish, acetic robes for more fashionable and luxurious ones) devotes himself to sin and dances wildly with six followers. In the final part (838-1108), Wisdom returns to chastise the three faculties for falling into temptation. Anima, Will, Mind and Understanding repent, and the devils are chased from the stage. Recognizing that redemption requires more than her remorse, Anima asks for God's mercy and grace. Wisdom grants both, before turning to the audience and ending the play with a sermon on avoiding sin and seeking grace.

== History ==
Like Mankind, the Macro Manuscript version of Wisdom bears a Latin inscription by the monk Thomas Hyngman and the phrase (translated), “Oh book, if anyone shall perhaps ask to whom you belong, you will say, “I belong above everything to Hyngham, a monk.” Similarities between this hand and the text of the play lead scholars to believe that Hyngman transcribed the play. Close parallels between the Digby version and Macro version (including congruence of transcription errors).

The particularities of the playtext's dialect suggest that Wisdom dates between 1460 and 1470 (Davidson argues for a range between 1460 and 1463). The language is an East Midland dialect, particularly common to Norfolk and Suffolk at the time of composition. Although the play conventionally goes by the name Wisdom today, neither manuscript notes a title. Former owner Thomas Sharp referred to the play by the title "Mind, Will, and Understanding" (after the three major characters). The now common moniker “Wisdom” is shorthand for A Morality of Wisdom, who is Christ, pioneered in an 1882 publication of the plays by the philologist Frederick James Furnivall. In August 1936, Joseph Quincy Adams, the Director of the Folger Shakespeare Library, purchased this manuscript along with Wisdom and The Castle from the antiquarian firm Bernard Quaritch for £1,125 (approximately $5,625).[4] The manuscripts had been purchased by Quaritch earlier in 1936 at a Sotheby's auction on March 30 for 440 pounds.

== Sources ==
Much of the play's theological material directly quotes the Vulgate Bible, including selections from Song of Songs, Psalms, Proverbs, Lamentations, Malachi, Ecclesiastes, Matthew, Romans, Ephesians, and Colossians. The characterization and costuming of Anima as the Bride of Christ come from passages of Henry Suso’s Horologium Sapientiae. Lucifer’s arguments to the three faculties in the temptation scene are mutations of 14th century mystic Walter Hilton’s writings in his Epistle on mixed life. At the play’s conclusion, sections of Anima’s repentance (particularly the language of Mind, Will and Understanding) come again from Hilton, in his major work The Scale of Perfection.

== Editions and Facsimiles ==
Several editions of Wisdom have been printed in the past century and a half, including:

- Baker, D. C., J. L. Murphy, and L. B. Hall, Jr., eds. The Late Medieval Religious Plays of Bod¬leian MSS Digby 133 and E. Museo 160. Oxford: Oxford University Press, 1982.
- Bevington, David, ed. The Macro Plays: A Facsimile Edition with Facing Transcription. New York: Johnson Reprint, 1972.
- Coldewey, John, ed. Early English Drama: An Anthology. New York: Garland, 1993.
- Eccles, Mark, ed. The Macro Plays. EETS o.s. 262. London: Oxford University Press, 1969.
- Riggio, Milla Cozart, ed. The Play of Wisdom: Its Texts and Contexts. New York: AMS Press, 1998.
- Walker, Greg, ed. Medieval Drama. Oxford: Blackwell, 2000.
