= Mankind (play) =

Medieval morality play, written c. 1470

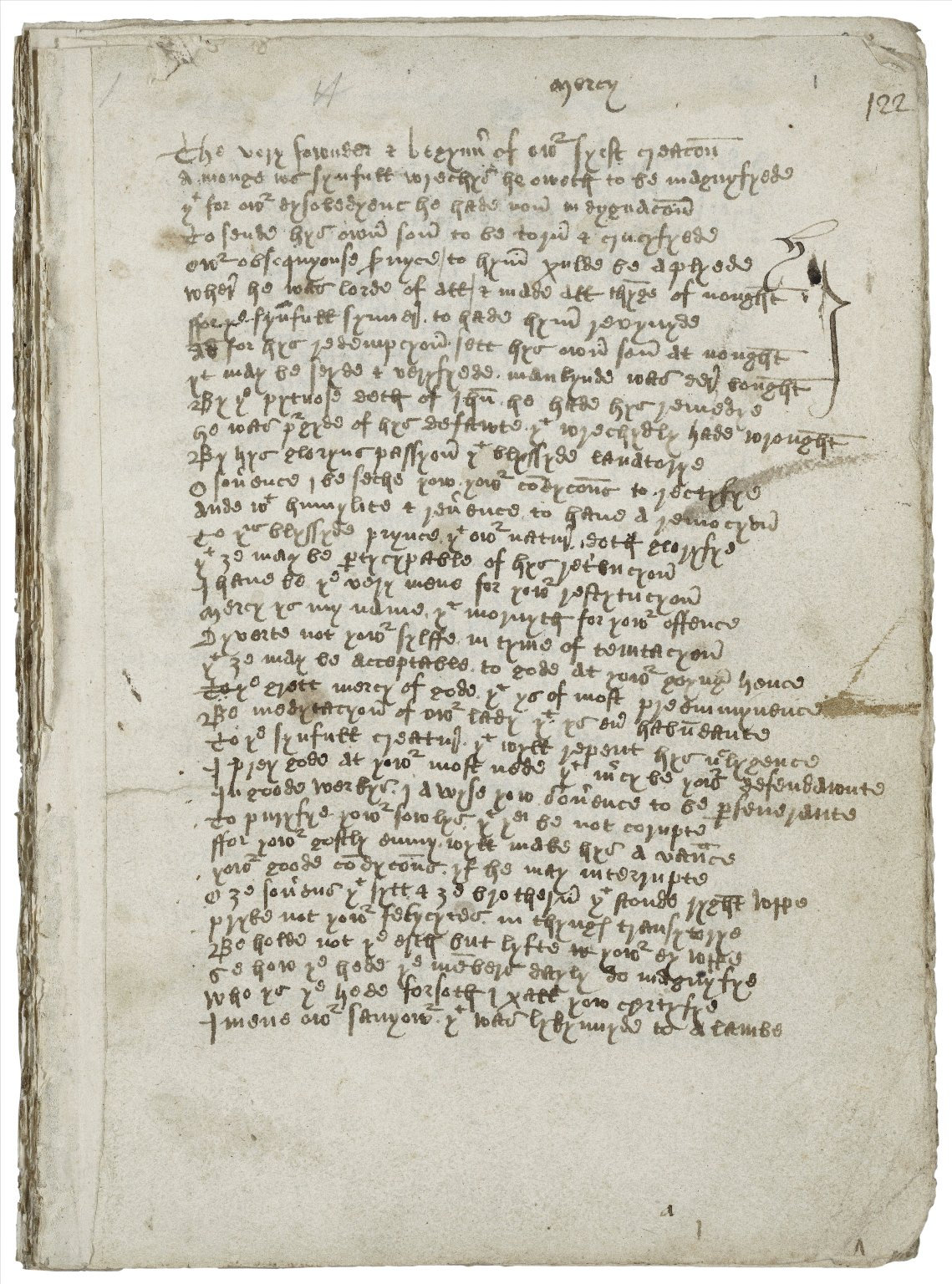
- A page from the Macro Manuscript, the only known source for Mankind
- Written by: Unknown
- Characters: Mercy; Mischief; Newguise; Nowadays; Nought; Mankind; Titivillus
- Original language: English
- Genre: Morality play

Premiere
- Date premiered: c. 1470
- Place premiered: East Anglia

Mankind is an English medieval morality play, written c. 1470. The play is a moral allegory about Mankind, a representative of the human race, and follows his fall into sin and his repentance. Its author is unknown; the manuscript is signed by a monk named Hyngham, believed to have transcribed the play. Mankind is unique among moralities for its surprising juxtaposition of serious theological matters and colloquial (sometimes obscene) dialogue. Along with the morality plays Wisdom and The Castle of Perseverance, Mankind belongs to the collection of the Folger Shakespeare Library in Washington, D.C., as a part of the Macro Manuscript (so named after 18th-century owner Cox Macro).

== Date and provenance ==
In his critical edition of the play published by the Early English Text Society in 1969, Eccles argues for a date between 1465 and 1470. Wickham, in his Dent edition of 1976, agrees, finally settling on 1470. Similarly, Lester, in his New Mermaids edition of 1981, offers between 1464 and 1471. Baker and, following his suggestion, Southern agree on a date of 1466. These arguments are based upon references to coinage in the playtext, specifically the "royal" and the "angel", which were minted between 1465 – 1470. The poem certainly dates from the reign of Edward IV of England, and likely has an East Anglian provenance; it was likely "intended to be performed in the area around Cambridge and the environs of Lynn in Norfolk." This is evidenced by numerous local place names dispersed throughout the play, including that of Bury St Edmunds, significant for being the home of two former owners of the play: Thomas Hyngman (15th century) and Cox Macro (18th century).

Like Wisdom, Mankind bears a Latin inscription by the monk Thomas Hyngman and the phrase (translated), “Oh book, if anyone shall perhaps ask to whom you belong, you will say, “I belong above everything to Hyngham, a monk.” Similarities between this hand and the text of the play lead scholars to believe that Hyngman transcribed the play. However, several textual oddities likely derive from Hyngman's miscopying of the text because he was unfamiliar with it, so scholars do not credit Hyngman with authorship.

Along with The Castle of Perseverance and Wisdom, Hyngman's Mankind was acquired by the Reverend Cox Macro in the early 18th century. Macro bound them together somewhat arbitrarily, along with three other non-dramatic manuscripts. Early 19th-century owner Henry Gurney separated The Castle, Wisdom, and Mankind from the other manuscripts and bound them together as a collection in a separate volume. In August 1936, Joseph Quincy Adams, the Director of the Folger Shakespeare Library, purchased this manuscript along with Wisdom and The Castle from the antiquarian firm Bernard Quaritch for £1,125 (approximately $5,625).[4] The manuscripts had been purchased by Quaritch earlier in 1936 at a Sotheby's auction on March 30 for £440.

== Synopsis ==
The play is a moral allegory about Mankind, a representative of the human race, and follows his fall into sin and his repentance. The audience is instructed in the proper Christian life by watching Mankind's fall and redemption.

The play begins with Mercy, who instructs the audience in how they should behave but is soon interrupted by Mischief. Mischief mocks Mercy's preaching. A page is then missing in the manuscript. When the play resumes, Mischief has departed and New Guise (in the sense of 'fashion'), Nowadays (i.e. 'living for today') and Nought (i.e. 'nothingness') are on stage. They continue the mockery of Mercy. After their exit, Mercy again addresses the audience, explaining why the three are evil and urging the audience to not follow their example.

Mankind enters, and addresses the audience, introducing himself. He is a farmer, and is resolved to live a virtuous life. Mercy instructs Mankind about how to continue in this goal, warning him specifically about Mischief, New Guise, Nowadays and Nought. But Mankind has to stand against temptation on his own, and so Mercy leaves.

New Guise, Nowadays and Nought return to tempt Mankind. First, they encourage the audience to join in with a scatological song. Then they turn their attention to Mankind, but he successfully resists their enticements and beats them off with his spade.

Mischief returns and conspires with New Guise, Nowadays and Nought to bring in a greater devil, Titivillus. But first, they demand that the audience pay money before they can see Titivillus. When the audience does so, Titivillus enters, and begins immediately making Mankind's life difficult. The audience can see him, but he is invisible to Mankind. He hardens the ground, making it hard to farm. He steals Mankind's seed and spade. He induces a need to urinate. He distracts him from his prayers. Finally Mankind becomes so frustrated that he gives up and goes to sleep, and Titivillus whispers to him that Mercy is dead. Through his scene, Titivillus implores the audience to keep silent and watch him, which makes the audience complicit in his actions.

Thus deluded, Mankind rejects Mercy and goes to join New Guise, Nowadays and Nought. But now their full evil is revealed. Mischief has been in jail, and has escaped, robbed the jailer, and raped his wife. New Guise has narrowly escaped hanging. Nowadays has robbed a church. The three have Mankind swear vows to join their gang, vows which also show their depravity—to be a highway robber, to seduce women, to 'rob, steal, and kill as fast as you may go' (708). When they leave, Mercy returns to plead with the audience about the unreliability of Mankind, and to pray for his redemption.

The three reveal to Mankind that Mercy is not really dead, and tempt him to kill himself rather than face Mercy. But Mercy chases them away.

The final struggle for Mankind's redemption is with himself. Mercy tells him all that he must do to be forgiven is to ask, but Mankind finds this difficult and raises a series of objections. The theology of the ending focuses on perseverance, on living as a Christian even while continuing to sin, even while trying not to, and having to repeatedly ask for mercy for those offences. Mankind finally accepts Mercy, and then promptly tries to blame the devils for his problems, but Mercy reminds him that he warned Mankind about them. For the play ends with Mercy addressing the audience again, exhorting them to repentance.

== Themes ==
Like other moralities, Mankind dramatizes the struggle over humanity between the forces of good and evil. Within this larger thematic structure, scholars have been fascinated by the comedic and potentially subversive tone of the play. The play is interested in the humour of transgression – five out of seven speaking roles are comic villains, making Mankind the lightest and most colloquial of the Macro plays. At the same time, the play places a remarkable emphasis on language. Greene argues that Titivillus and the vices under his command reduce Mankind to the level of a dumb beast, lost and on the brink of damnation, by drawing him into their perverse, topsy-turvy distortions of language. In his introduction to Furnivall's edition, Pollard writes that the "low tone" of the play is due to its nature as an economic venture, since the tone appealed to the largely uneducated common audiences for whom players performed. Eccles notes that Mankind is the first English play to "mention gathering money from an audience". Indeed, the play calls for a relatively significant amount of audience participation, as in the scene where New Guise, Nowadays and Naught cajole the audience into singing obscene carols with them. Ashley notes that in this way, "the audience itself is tricked into complicity with the devil’s machinations against Mankind."
