= Joseph Quincy Adams Jr. =

20th-century American Shakespeare scholar (1880–1946)

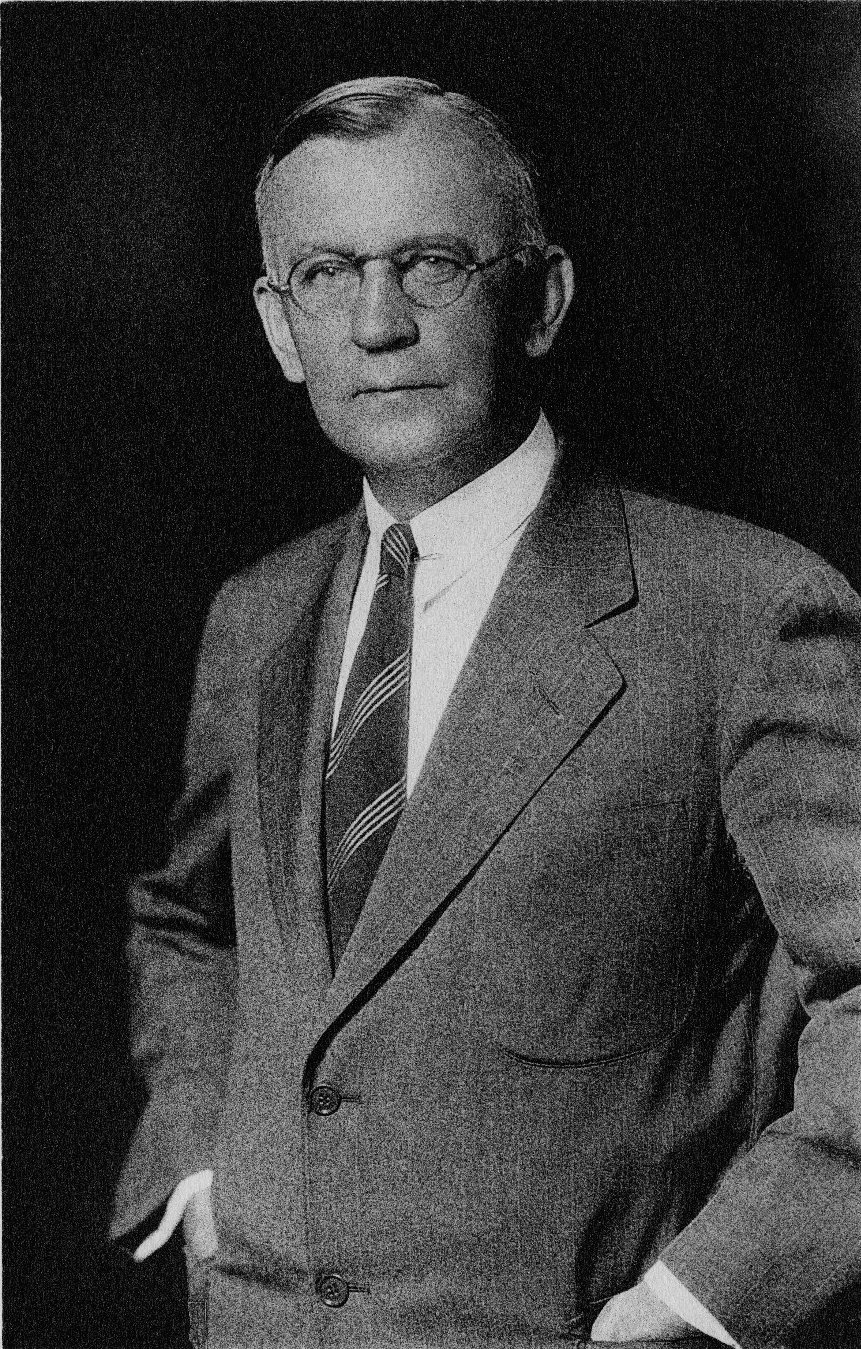
Adams

Joseph Quincy Adams Jr. (March 23, 1880 – November 10, 1946) was a prominent Shakespeare scholar and the first officially appointed director of the Folger Shakespeare Library in Washington, D.C.

== Biography ==
Adams, a scion of the famous Adams family that produced two American Presidents, John Adams and John Quincy Adams, was born in Greenville, South Carolina, the son of a Rev. Joseph Quincy Adams, a Baptist clergyman, and Mamie Fouchée Adams (née Davis). He received his B.A. degree from Wake Forest College in 1900, and earned an M.A. degree from the same institution in 1901. He continued his education at the University of Chicago (1902–3), and at the University of Berlin (1907). He pursued a teaching career at several institutions, notably at Cornell University, where he also edited the journal Cornell Studies in English (1910–31).

Adams married Helen Banks on January 29, 1931, though she died a short four years later, on September 14, 1935.

Adams was actively involved with the Folger Shakespeare Library from its founding in 1931. He became the Library's acting director in 1934, and its first regularly appointed director in 1936. In Adams' 1932 inaugural speech at the Folger, he called immigration "a menace to the preservation of our long-established English civilization." He also served as the editor of its periodical publications, as well as the general editor of the New Variorum edition of Shakespeare's works (1935–46). He wrote and published a wide range of books and scholarly articles; he was especially noted for his biography of Shakespeare, first published in 1923. He was also a member of the Literary Society of Washington. He was elected to the American Philosophical Society in 1940.

== Sources ==
- Kahn, Coppélia; Nathans, Heather S. (2011). "Introduction". In Kahn, Coppélia; Nathans, Heather S.; Godfrey, Mimi (eds.). Shakespearean Educations: Power, Citizenship, and Performance. University of Delaware Press. ISBN 978-1-61149-028-2.
- McManaway, James G.; Dawson, Giles E.; Willoughby, Edwin E., eds. (1948). Joseph Quincy Adams: Memorial Studies. Washington, DC: Folger Shakespeare Library. ASIN B000L5KH02.
- Spauling, Thomas M. (1947). The Literary Society in Peace and War. Washington, D.C.: George Banta Publishing Company.
- "Joseph Quincy Adams". White House Historical Association.
