= Hugh the Drover =

1924 opera in two acts by Ralph Vaughan Williams

- Opera by Ralph Vaughan Williams
- Vaughan Williams c. 1920
- Librettist: Harold Child
- Language: English
- Premiere: 14 July 1924; His Majesty's Theatre, London

Hugh the Drover (or Love in the Stocks) is an opera in two acts by Ralph Vaughan Williams to an original English libretto by Harold Child. The work has set numbers with recitatives. It has been described as a modern example of a ballad opera. Contemporary comment noted the use of humour and the role of the chorus in the work, in the context of developing English opera.

== History ==
According to Michael Kennedy, the composer took first inspiration for the opera from this question to Bruce Richmond, editor of The Times Literary Supplement, around 1909–1910:

"I want to set a prize fight to music. Can you find someone to make a libretto for me?"

Vaughan Williams worked on the opera for a number of years, before and after World War I. The work did not receive its first performance until 4 July 1924 at the Royal College of Music, London, in performances described as "private dress rehearsals". The "professional premiere" was at His Majesty's Theatre, London, on 14 July 1924. On 26 and 27 March 1926, a condensed version of the opera was performed by pupils at Caterham School, and Vaughan Williams was in attendance. The Times reported that "that the sincerity of the whole performance had shown him the points at which the music itself lacked sincerity." The opera's first performance in the United States took place on 21 February 1928 under the auspices of the Washington National Opera, a semi-professional company not related to its present namesake. Tudor Davies created the role of Hugh in both these productions.

The opera was performed by the professional Canadian Opera Company in Toronto in November 1929, at the Royal Alexandra Theatre in Toronto, with a live radio broadcast from the Royal York Hotel on 13 November 1929. In the broadcast, hockey broadcaster Foster Hewitt provided narrative for the fight sequence. These Toronto performances were conducted by Sir Ernest MacMillan, music director of the Toronto Symphony Orchestra from 1931 to 1955, and featured American tenor Allan Jones in the title role of Hugh. Jones would soon become a Hollywood star. Vaughan Williams continued to revise the libretto and the opera over the remainder of his life. The final version was performed in 1956 and published in 1959.

== Roles ==
Roles, voice types, premiere cast
Role	Voice type	Premiere, 4 July 1924, Royal College of Music Conductor: S P Waddington	Professional premiere, BNOC 14 July 1924 Conductor: Malcolm Sargent
Mary	soprano	Odette De Foras	Mary Lewis
Aunt Jane	mezzo-soprano	Mona Benson	Constance Willis
Hugh the drover	tenor	Trefor Jones	Tudor Davies
John the butcher	baritone	Leyland White	Frederic Collier
Sergeant	baritone	William Herbert	Browning Mummery
Constable	bass	Keith Falkner	William Anderson
A cheap-jack	tenor		
Shellfish seller	bass		
Primrose seller	soprano		
Showman	baritone		
Ballad seller	tenor		
Susan	soprano		
Nancy	mezzo-soprano		
William	tenor		
Turnkey	tenor		
Fool	tenor		
Innkeeper	baritone		
Chorus:

== Synopsis ==
Place: The Cotswolds
Time: 1812.

=== Act 1 ===
The outskirts of the town

A fair is taking place; the people of the town have turned out; vendors hawk their wares. A showman presents an effigy of Napoleon Bonaparte and rouses the crowd to a fever-pitch of patriotic zeal.

Mary, the daughter of the local constable, appears with her aunt. Her father wants to marry her to John the butcher, a crass, overbearing man whom she does not love. When John roughly takes Mary’s arm to walk through the fairgrounds with her, she resists. He threatens her in turn, but when a troop of morris men passes through, the crowd follows along and John is pulled along with them, leaving Mary alone with her aunt.

As Mary sings of her dreams of freedom, a young man appears and tells her of his life on the open road. He is Hugh the Drover, a driver of animals, who makes his living by providing horses for the army. Mary is fascinated by his words, and Hugh tells her that he was fated to love her. The two declare their love for each other and embrace.

The crowd returns and the showman organises a prizefight, inviting all the men to challenge John the butcher. Hugh agrees to box, but only if the prize is Mary herself. He beats John in the match, only to have John spitefully accuse him of being a French spy. The crowd turns against Hugh and he is led off to the stocks.

=== Act 2 ===
The town square, early morning

A troop of soldiers has been sent for to take Hugh into custody. Meanwhile, he remains a prisoner in the stocks.

Mary stealthily comes to rescue him, having stolen the key to the stocks from her father. She frees him, but before they can escape, they hear John and his comrades approaching. Each refuses to leave without the other, and they both get into the stocks (which are large enough to hold two), draping Hugh's cloak over their bodies. When they are exposed, Mary's father disowns her and John refuses to marry her.

The soldiers arrive, and their sergeant recognises Hugh as an old friend who once saved his life. Instead of arresting him, they acclaim him as a loyal Briton – but take John the butcher for a soldier and march off with him.

Hugh and Mary reaffirm their love. Hugh asks Mary to join him, and she at first is hesitant, as is Aunt Jane to lose her. However, Mary finally says 'yes', and she and Hugh bid the town farewell to begin their life together.

== Recordings ==
- HMV SLS 5162: Sheila Armstrong, Robert Tear, Helen Watts, Michael Rippon; Ambrosian Opera Chorus; Royal Philharmonic Orchestra; Sir Charles Groves, conductor (first recording)
- Hyperion (original code CDA66901/2, reissue code CDD22049): Rebecca Evans, Bonaventura Bottone, Sarah Walker, Richard Van Allan, Alan Opie, Neil Jenkins, Harry Nicoll, Karl Morgan Daymond, Adrian Hutton, Julia Gooding, Wynford Evans, Jenny Saunders, Alice Coote, Lynton Atkinson, Paul Robinson, John Pearce, Paul Im Thurm, Robert Poulton; Corydon Singers; The New London Children's Choir; Corydon Orchestra; Matthew Best, conductor
