= Poculi Ludique Societas =

Poculi Ludique Societas (PLS), the Medieval & Renaissance Players of Toronto, sponsors productions of early plays, from the beginnings of medieval drama (see mystery play) to as late as the middle of the seventeenth century.

The group had its origins in 1964–1965 in a seminar on medieval drama conducted at the University of Toronto. For more than forty years, PLS was associated with the university's Centre For Medieval Studies (CMS), offering a regular schedule of plays every year. Now, as part of the Centre for Performance Studies in Early Theatre, PLS operates in affiliation with the Centre for Drama, Theatre and Performance Studies. PLS has toured in Canada, the United States and Europe. PLS also collaborates with the theatre history research project Records of Early English Drama (REED) at the University of Toronto.

== PLS Productions, 1964–2024 ==
1964 Everyman

1965 Wit and Science by John Redford; St. George Mummer's Play; Towneley Secunda Pastorum

1966 Gammer Gurton's Needle; Mankynde; A Christmas Revelles

1967 The Play of David; Coventry Pageant of Shearman and Taylors; Ralph Roister Doister by Nicholas Udall; York Crucifixion Sequence

1968 Cambises by Thomas Preston; Like Will to Like by Ulpian Fulwell; Towneley Secunda Pastorum; Towneley Cain and Abel, Noah

1969 The Digby Play of St. Mary Magdalene; N-Town Adoration of the Magi, Death of Herod; Towneley Slaughter of the Innocents, Flight into Egypt; Chester Creation of the World, Noah's Flood; Hycke Scorner

1970 The Somonyng of Everyman; Planctus Mariae; More Dissemblers besides Women by Thomas Middleton; Mankynde; The Four PP by John Heywood; Towneley Prima Pastorum

1971 The Imposture by James Shirley; Johan Johan by John Heywood, and Once More Pericles by William Shakespeare; Lancelot of Denmark and Dame Sirith; Three Towneley Nativity Pageants

1972 Filius Getronis; Towneley Mactacio Abel, Noah; Witt and Wisdome; Pleasure Reconciled to Virtue by Ben Jonson; N-Town Assumption of the Virgin; Towneley Last Judgment

1973 A Re-enactment of the Coronation and the Mass of Henry V; York Baptism, Temptation; N-Town Women Taken in Adultery, Colifizacio, Scourging, Crucifixion; The Franklin's Tale, The Washtub

1974 Fulgens and Lucrece; Towneley The Talents, The Resurrection; Officium in Nocte Resurrectionis, Music at the Time of Petrarch; Pierre Pathelin; Towneley Secunda Pastorum, York Herod Plays

1975 Magnyfycence by John Skelton; The Sport of the Friar, The Sport of the Drunken Monk by King Mahendra; Arden of Faversham

1976 Sampson Dux Fortissime; Bassingham Mummer's Play; The Dance of Death by John Lydgate; Towneley Judgement

1977 Two Cain and Abel Plays (Chester and Towneley); Visitatio Sepulchri; Mankynde; The York Cycle (48 separate pageants)

1978 Romeo and Juliet by William Shakespeare; Johan Johan by John Heywood; The Dead Man, The Hot Iron and The Stolen Shrovetide Cock by Hans Sachs; Nice Wanton; A Mummer's Play; A Renaissance High Mass

1979 Much Ado About Nothing by William Shakespeare; A Winter's Revels; The Castle of Perseverance; 13th Century Spanish Music; The World and the Child

1980 The Blessed Apple Tree; The Taming of the Shrew by William Shakespeare; Robin Hood and the Friar; Towneley Murder of Abel, Abraham and Isaac; The Brome Abraham

1981 Tom Tyler and His Wife; The Toronto Passion Play; Hyde Park by James Shirley

1982 Ralph Roister Doister by Nicholas Udall; Towneley Noah and Secunda Pastorum; Fool Surgery; The Pie and the Tart; Johan Johan (puppet production); Edward II by Christopher Marlowe; The Fleury Slaughter of the Innocents; Aminta by Torquato Tasso

1983 The Play of Daniel; The Chester Cycle of Mystery Plays (24 separate pageants); Wit and Science by John Redford

1984 La Calandria; Doctor Faustus by Christopher Marlowe; Man's Desire and Fleeting Beauty; Coventry Christmas Plays

1985 N-Town Death of Herod; The Dead Husband The Comedy of Errors by William Shakespeare; The Towneley Cycle of Mystery Cycles (32 separate pageants); Wealth and Health; Towneley Nativity Sequence

1986 The Nun Who Left Her Abbey; Watkins Ale; Confessions of Rifflart; King John by William Shakespeare; York Nativity Sequence

1987 A Fourteenth Century Easter Matins Sir Gawain and the Green Knight

1988 The N-Town Pageants: A Medieval History of the World (21 separate pageants); Homo; Like Will to Like by Ulpian Fulwell; The Presentation of the Virgin by Phillipe de Mezieres

1989 Gammer Gurton's Needle; The Quack Dentist

1990 The Feast of St. Ursula: Lauds and hymns of Hildegard von Bingen; Everyman; Jesuskind: Christmas Vespers and Procession

1991 A Looking Glasse for London and England by Thomas Lodge and Robert Greene; Wisdom; No Wit, No Help Like a Woman's by Thomas Middleton; Jesuskind: Christmas Vespers and Procession; Youth and Hickscorner

1992 N-Town Assumption of the Virgin; Robin Hood and the Friar

1993 Le Jeu de Robin et Marion; The Widow's Tears by George Chapman

1994 The Digby Conversion of St. Paul; A Mery Play betwene Johan Johan the Husbande, Tib his wife, and Sir Johan the Preest; A Yorkshire Tragedy

1995 Mankind; Occupacion and Ydelnesse; Four episodes from the York Cycle: Annunciation, Joseph's Troubles, Nativity, Shepherds; The Play of Daniel (Joint production with The Toronto Consort)

1996 Three episodes from the York Cycle: Fall and Expulsion, Temptation of Christ, Crucifixion; Antony and Cleopatra by William Shakespeare; N-Town Trial of Joseph and Mary and Towneley Second Shepherds' Play; The Wandering Scholar from Paradise by Hans Sachs

1997 The Joy of Sachs: The Doctor with the Big Nose, The Wandering Scholar from Paradise, The Stolen Shrovetide Cock; Towneley Noah's Ark; Gammer Gurton's Needle

1998 The York Cycle (48 separate plays); Coventry Shearmen and Taylors' Pageant; The Spanish Tragedy by Thomas Kyd

1999 Chester Antichrist (modern-dress); The Woman In the Moone by John Lyly

2000 Arden of Feversham

2001 Aminta by Torquato Tasso (co-production with University of Toronto Graduate Centre for Study of Drama ); The Conversion of the Harlot Thais by Hroswitha of Gandersheim; Robin Hood and the Friar

2002 Troilus and Cressida by William Shakespeare

2003 The Digby Mary Magdalene; The World and the Child; The Chester Shepherds

2004 The Chester Antichrist; The Old Wives Tale by George Peele; Don Juan, Ladykiller of Seville; The Second Shepherd's Play and Officium Stellae

2005 Friar Bacon and Friar Bungay by Robert Greene; Joseph's Trouble About Mary and Jesuskind: Christmas Vespers and Procession

2006 Jesuskind and The York Nativity; King Leir, The Famous Victories of Henry V, Friar Bacon and Friar Bungay (in association with Shakespeare and the Queen’s Men)

2007 The True Tragedy of Richard the Third (co-production with the Graduate Centre for Study of Drama); The N-Town Parliament in Heaven and Annunciation (co-production with SINE NOMINE)

2008 Ram Alley by Lording Barry; N-Town Plays Trial of Mary and Joseph and The Woman Taken in Adultery

2009 Clyomon and Clamydes (co-production with the Graduate Centre for Study of Drama); A Child Shall Be Born: Annunciation and Nativity Pageants from the Chester Cycle

2010 Inside Out: The Persistence of Allegory in Renaissance Performance (co-production with the Graduate Centre for Study of Drama); Chester 2010 (Chester Mystery Plays); What Light Is This? A Medieval Nativity Pageant (York Mystery Plays; co-production with St Thomas’s Anglican Church)

2011 New Custom: A New Interlude, No Less Witty than Pleasant (co-production with the Graduate Centre for Study of Drama); To Seek a Child (Chester Mystery Plays; sponsored by Friends of the Creche at the Cathedral Church of St James)

2012 Behold the Time of Mercy: Medieval pageants for Lent (N-Town Plays; co-production with St Thomas’s Anglican Church); A Christian Turn'd Turk by Robert Daborne (co-production with Centre for Drama, Theatre and Performance Studies); A Medieval Christmas: Go We Hence to Bethlehem’s Bower (N-Town Plays; co-production with St Thomas’s Anglican Church)

2013 Three Farces from Three Lands (The Farce of the Fisherman by Cornelis Everaert, The Stolen Shrovetide Cock by Hans Sachs and Johan Johan The Husband by John Heywood); Mucedorus (co-production with Graduate Centre for Study of Drama); A Medieval Christmas: Such Splendid Sight Was Never Seen (Towneley Plays; co-production with St Thomas’s Anglican Church)

2014 Rules of Love: Lancelot of Denmark and Of Winter And Summer; Fulgens and Lucres by Henry Medwall (co-production with the Centre for Drama, Theatre and Performance Studies); A Medieval Christmas: With Song We Seek Our Saviour (York Corpus Christi Plays; co-production with St Thomas's Anglican Church)

2015 Mankind (at The Cloisters, NYC); Festival of Early Drama; The N-Town Mary Play; A Medieval Christmas: This is a Marvellous Hearing (N-Town Plays; co-production with St Thomas's Anglican Church)

2016 Mankind and The Pride of Life (UK tour and Toronto performances)

2017 Dulcitius; The Towneley Second Shepherds' Play (co-production with Centre for Drama, Theatre and Performance Studies)

2018 Dame Sirith

2019 Dutch Courtesan by John Marston (co-production with Centre for Drama, Theatre and Performance Studies); Babio

2021 The Mary Magdalene Project (Digby; Zoom performance co-produced with University of Toronto English Department, Centre for Medieval Studies, Centre for Drama, Theatre and Performance Studies)

2023 Very Gluttonous, Very Raunchy, Very Late Medieval: A Staged Reading of Six New Play Translations from Middle French and Fifteenth-Century Spanish (co-produced with the Jackman Humanities Institute's Medieval World Drama Working Group)

2024 Lusty Juventus: A Tudor Moral Interlude by R. Wever; The Infatuated and the Ravishing: a workshop reading of Muḥammad ibn Dāniyāl’s shadow play from 13th/14th-century Cairo (co-production with Jackman Humanities Institute's World Drama Working Group)

== See also ==
- Mystery play
- Medieval theatre
- Easter Drama
- Passion play
- Wakefield Mystery Plays - a collection of thirty-two mystery plays performed in medieval and early Renaissance England
- York Mystery Plays - a collection of forty-eight mystery plays
- William Shakespeare
- English Renaissance theatre
- The Queen's Men - Queen Elizabeth I's playing company
