= Charles Holmes =

English painter and museum director (1868–1936)

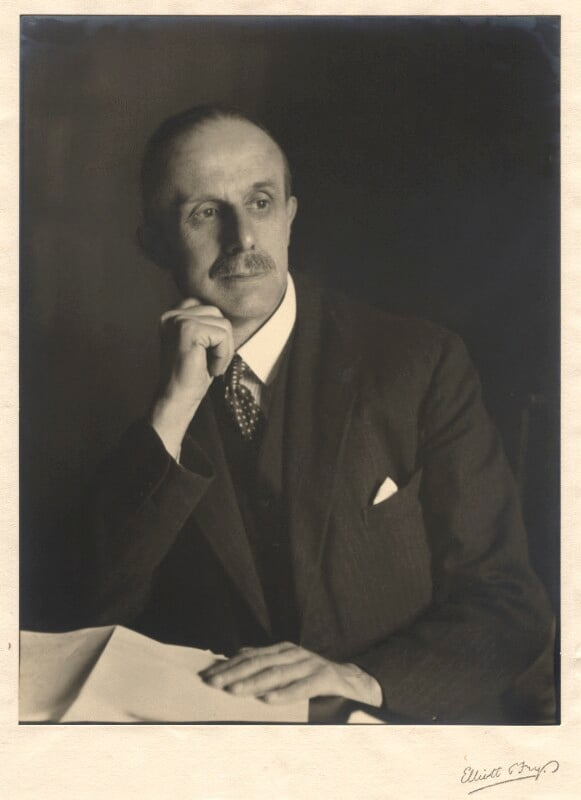
Holmes in the 1920s

Sir Charles John Holmes, KCVO (11 November 1868, Preston, Lancashire – 7 December 1936, Kensington, London) was a British painter, art historian and museum director.

Holmes was Slade Professor of Fine Art at Oxford University (1904 to 1910). At the same time he co-edited The Burlington Magazine from 1904 to 1909. Holmes was appointed director of the National Portrait Gallery in 1909, resigning in 1916 to become Director of the National Gallery, from which he retired in 1928.

His writing on art combined theory with practice, and he was an expert on the painting techniques of the Old Masters, from whose example he had learned to draw and paint.

== Early life ==
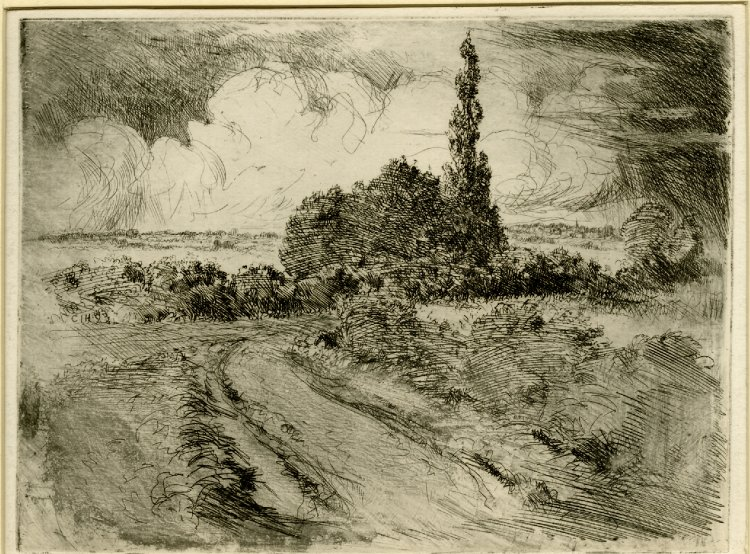
Near Beckley, Sussex, etching, 1893

Holmes was the son of a clergyman, Charles Rivington Holmes, and Mary Susan Dickson. His uncle was Sir Richard Rivington Holmes, Librarian at Windsor Castle. His grandfather had been Assistant Keeper of manuscripts at the British Museum.

He attended Eton College from 1883 and attained a scholarship to Brasenose College, Oxford in 1887. From 1889, Holmes worked as a publisher's and printer's assistant in London, first for his cousin Francis Rivington, then at the Ballantyne Press, and finally with John Cumming Nimmo. From 1896 to 1903, he was manager of the Vale Press, supporting Charles Ricketts and Charles Shannon. Holmes also wrote an art column for the Athenaeum which he shared with Roger Fry. In 1903, Holmes married his cousin, the musician Florence Mary Rivington.

== Later career ==
From 1904 to 1910, Holmes was Slade Professor of Fine Art at Oxford University. At the same time, his experience in the field of publishing contributed to the early success of The Burlington Magazine (founded 1903), which he edited from 1904 to 1909 (co-editor with Robert Dell until 1906, co-editor with Harold Child from 1907).

Upon the retirement of Lionel Cust, Holmes was appointed director of the National Portrait Gallery in 1909. He resigned this post in 1916 to take up his appointment as director of the National Gallery. Since a change in the constitution of the gallery meant that Holmes was not given the absolute authority in the choice of purchases which his predecessors had enjoyed, Holmes instead made it his priority to familiarise the general public with the contents of the museum. Using his experience as a critic and in publishing, he published a series of catalogues of the National Gallery's holdings and produced a guide book. He retired in 1928.

== Artist ==
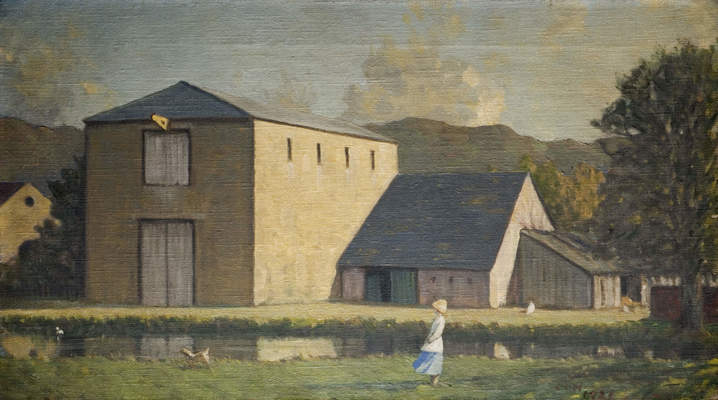
A Warehouse, 1921, oils

Holmes was a draughtsman, painter in watercolours and oils, and etcher, mostly of landscapes. Self taught, he developed a highly personal style from studying European as well as Japanese sources like Hiroshige and Hokusai, travelling to Japan in 1889. These influences can be seen in his magazine, the Studio Magazine, founded in 1893. Later, he came under the artistic influence of Ricketts, and he learned etching from William Strang. He is also known for his industrial landscapes in which industrial buildings and activities play a major part. Examples for this can be found at Samlesbury Hall for which he painted a series of views around Blackburn und Preston (exhibited at Colnaghi's, London, in 1928).

His stature as an artist was acknowledged when, in 1904 or 1905, he was admitted as a member into the New English Art Club with whom he had already exhibited from 1900. He was also six times participant at the Venice Biennale between 1912 and 1930, and became a member of the Royal Society of Painters in Watercolours in 1929 (associate from 1924; vice-president in 1935). He held one-man shows at the Carfax Gallery, Piccadilly, in 1909, 1911 and 1913. A memorial exhibition was held in London by the Fine Art Society in 1937.

== Works ==
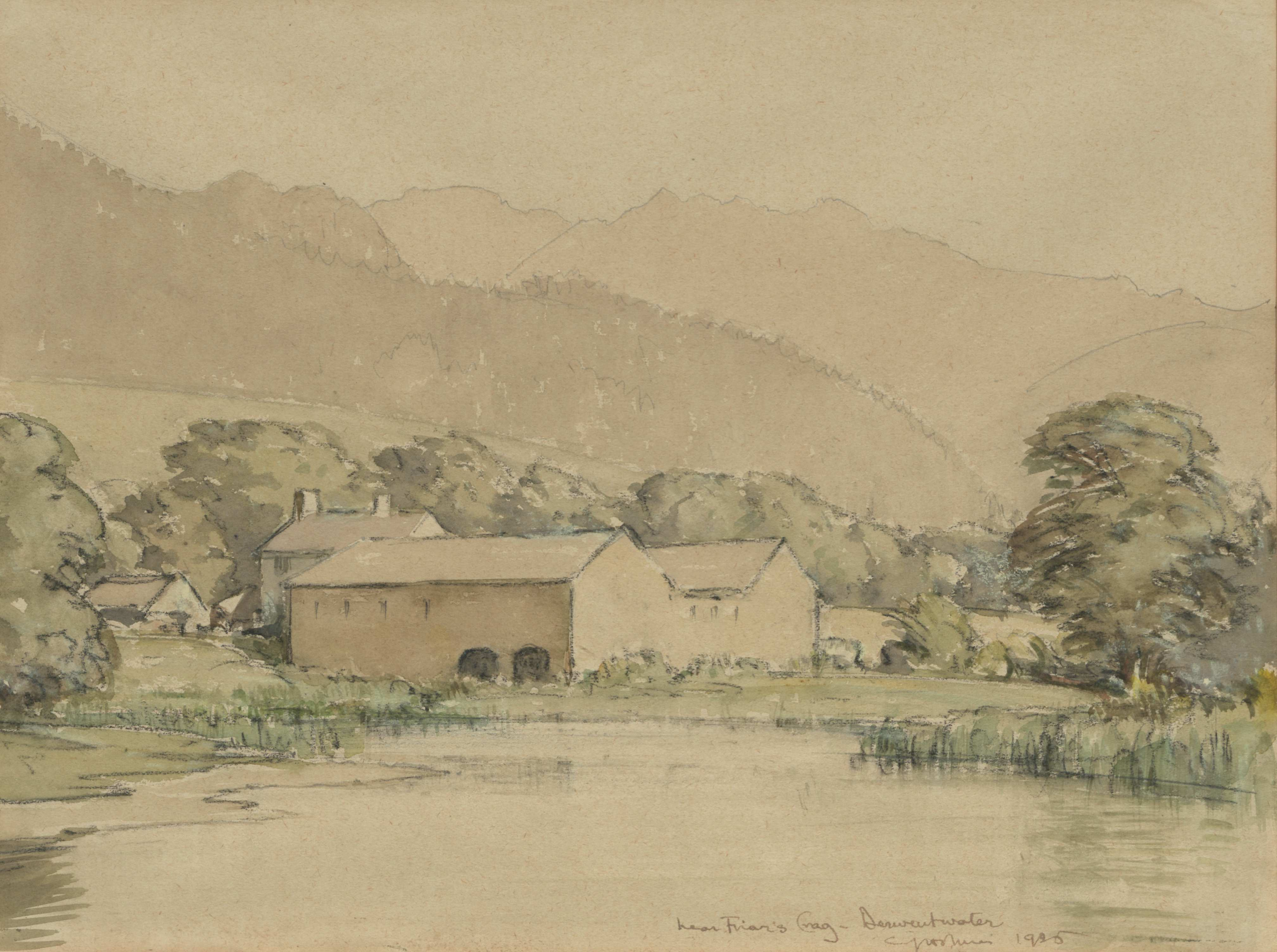
Near Friar's Crag, Derwentwater, Aberdeen Archives, Gallery & Museums Collection

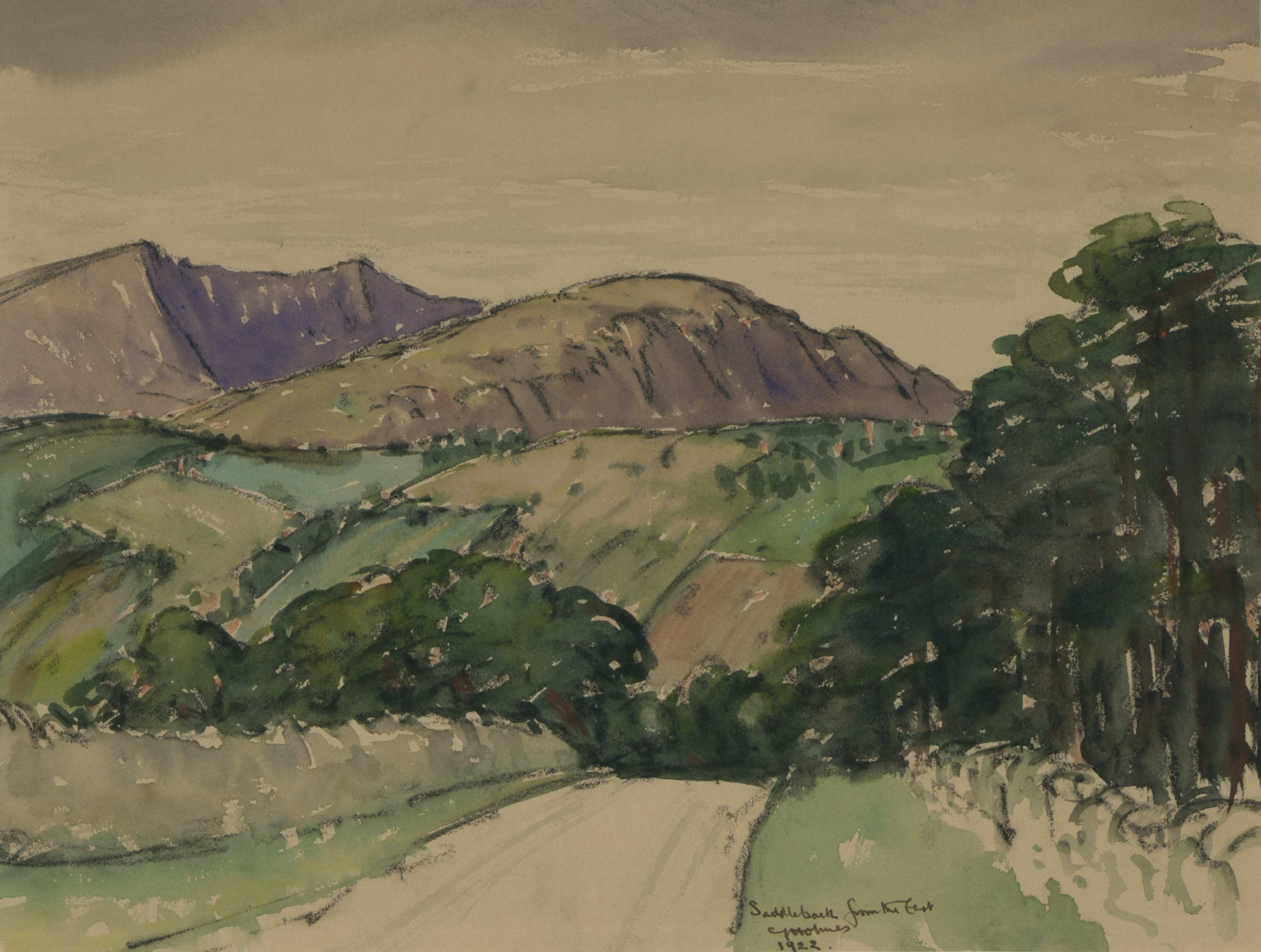
Saddleback, Aberdeen Archives, Gallery & Museums Collection

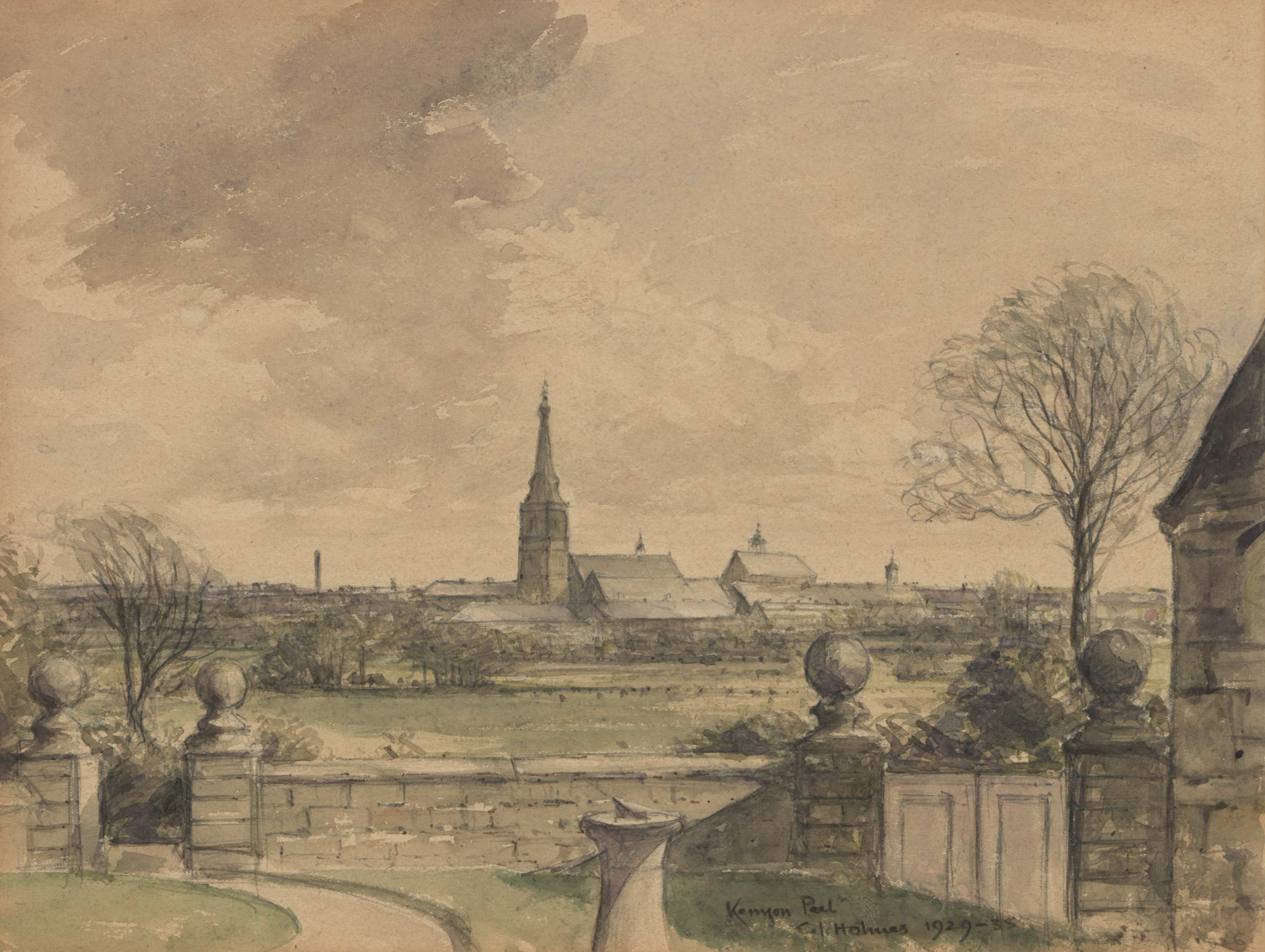
Kenyon Perl, Aberdeen Archives, Gallery & Museums Collection

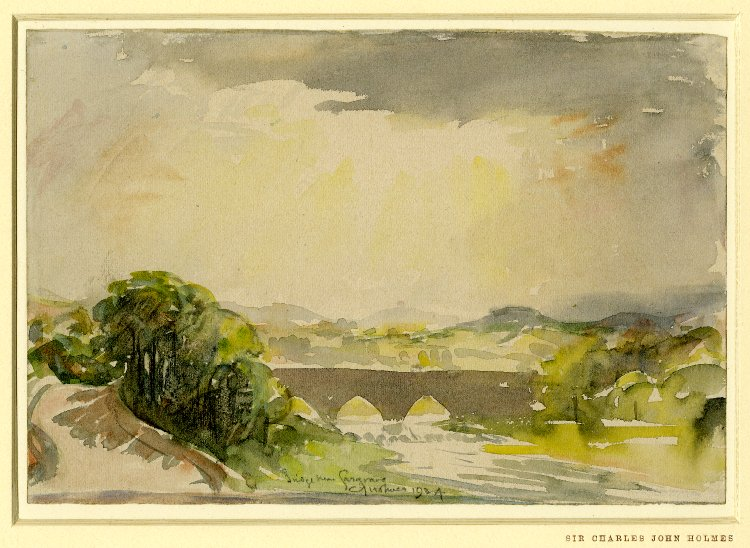
Bridge near Gargrave, British Museum

== Honours ==
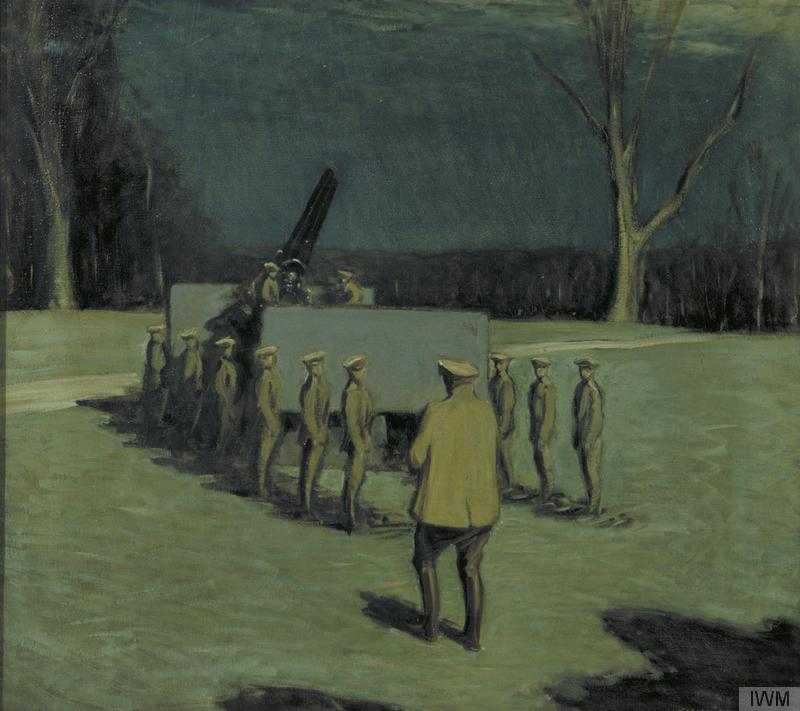
Anti Aircraft gun crew at Sandringham, 1919; Holmes was a member of this crew

Holmes received a knighthood in 1921, and was made a Knight Commander of the Royal Victorian Order (KCVO) in the 1928 Birthday Honours, the year of his retirement. He also held honorary doctorates from the universities of Cambridge and Leeds und was made an Honorary Fellow of Brasenose College in 1931. The College holds three of his watercolours.

== Selected writings ==
- Hokusai, 1899
- Constable, 1901 – available as a Kindle book
- Constable and His Influence on Landscape Painting, 1902
- Notes on the Science of Picture-Making, 1909
- Notes on the Post-Impressionist Painters, Grafton Galleries, 1910–11, 1910
- Notes on the Art of Rembrandt, 1911
- Leonardo da Vinci, 1919, Proceedings of the British Academy, vol. 9, pp. 53–78; Master-Mind Lecture, on Leonardo da Vinci
- The Making of the National Gallery, 1824–1924. An historical sketch, 1924 (together with C. H. Collins Baker)
- A Grammar of the Arts, 1931
- Self and Partners (Mostly Self), 1936 (Autobiography)
