= Canticles (Britten) =

Five compositions by Benjamin Britten

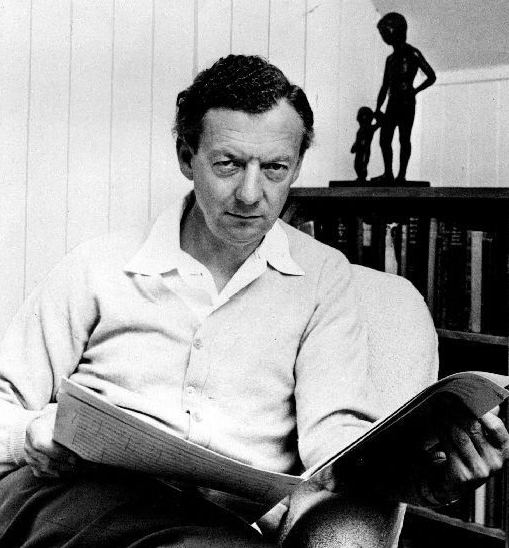
Benjamin Britten in 1968

The Canticles constitute a series of five musical works by composer Benjamin Britten. The pieces were written at various points in his career, with three of them written as memorials. Instrumentation differs on each piece, and several are based on non-sacred texts. A review in Opera Today notes, "Britten didn't draw upon the Scriptures for the texts of his canticles, which resemble cantatas more than church hymns in scale and structure, but an intense religious spirit pervades them all." Musicologist Peter Evans notes the works contain a "mood of spiritual elevation intense enough to demand realization in an ambitious musical structure".

== Canticles ==
- Canticle I: My beloved is mine and I am his, Op. 40. was written in 1947 for the memorial concert for Dick Sheppard, former vicar of St Martin-in-the-Fields. The lyrics are from "A Divine Rapture" by Francis Quarles, based on the Song of Solomon in the Bible. It is scored for high voice and piano.
- Canticle II: Abraham and Isaac. Op. 51, was written in 1952 for Peter Pears, Kathleen Ferrier and Britten to perform as a fundraiser for the English Opera Group. The text is based on the Abraham and Isaac story as depicted in the Chester Mystery Plays.
- Canticle III: "Still falls the rain", Op. 55, was written for voice, horn, and piano in 1954 in memory of Australian pianist Noel Mewton-Wood. The text is based on the 1941 Edith Sitwell poem of the same title.
- Canticle IV: "The Journey of the Magi", Op. 86, was written in 1971 for countertenor, tenor, baritone and piano, with text based on the T. S. Eliot poem "Journey of the Magi".
- Canticle V: The Death of Saint Narcissus, Op. 89, was written in 1974 in memory of William Plomer. It was written for performance by Peter Pears and harpist Osian Ellis.
