= The Brome play of Abraham and Isaac =

The Brome play of Abraham and Isaac (also known as The Brome "Abraham and Isaac", The Brome Abraham, and The Sacrifice of Isaac) is a fifteenth-century play of unknown authorship, written in an East Anglian dialect of Middle English, which dramatises the story of the Akedah, the binding of Isaac.

== The play ==
In the opening scene, Abraham prays to God, thanking Him for His various blessings, most of all his favourite son, Isaac. Next, God reveals to an angel that he will test Abraham's faith by asking him to sacrifice Isaac. The angel conveys this instruction to Abraham who, though he is distraught, agrees to comply with it. Abraham takes Isaac to the place of sacrifice, his grief made all the greater by Isaac (not yet knowing he is the "qweke best" intended for sacrifice) being eager to aid his father. When Abraham reveals that he means to kill him, Isaac at first pleads for his life. However, when he learns that it is God's will that he should die, Isaac acquiesces in his death, even urging his father not to tarry over the deed. Abraham binds Isaac so that he will not deflect his father's sword but when he draws that sword and prepares to strike, the angel appears and takes it out of his hand. The angel reveals that God is pleased with Abraham's obedience and that Isaac need not be sacrificed after all. Leaving them with a ram, the angel departs. As they make the offering, God appears above (the medieval custom was to have God act at a higher level than other characters) and promises them that "for thys dede | I schall mvltyplye yowres botheres [both] sede | As thyke as sterres be in the skye". In an epilogue a doctor, a stock figure in medieval drama, appears and points the moral that we should obey God's commandments and not rail against the designs God has for us.

== Scholarship ==
The text of the play was lost until the 19th century, when a manuscript was found in a commonplace book dating from around 1470–80 at Brome Manor, Suffolk, England. The manuscript itself has been dated at 1454 at the earliest. This manuscript is now housed at Yale University's Beinecke Rare Book and Manuscript Library.

While Joseph Quincy Adams Jr. reckoned the Brome Abraham "must be dated as early as the fourteenth century,” most other scholars assign various periods of the fifteenth century for the play's composition.

All of the surviving English mystery cycles (such as the N-Town Plays, Wakefield Mystery Plays, York Mystery Plays, and the first part of the Cornish language Ordinalia, along with another individual fifteenth-century English play, the so-called Northampton Abraham (or Dublin Abrahamso called because the manuscript is kept at Trinity College Library, Dublin).) deal with the story of Abraham and Isaac. However, the Brome Abraham seems to be most closely related to the barbers' play of Abraham in the Chester Mystery Plays. A comparison of the texts reveals around 200 lines of striking similarity, in particular during the debates between Abraham and Isaac that are at the hearts of the plays. A. M. Kinghorn judged the Brome play to be a superior reworking of the Chester pageant, and accordingly dated the play to late in the fifteenth century. However, comparing the two, J. Burke Severs decided that the Chester play was an expansion and reworking of the Brome one.

It is not known whether the play was originally part of a larger cycle of mystery plays or if it stood by itself, as Osborn Waterhouse of the Early English Text Society believed (though he conceded that it was to be supposed "that the stage was the usual pageant, and the mode of performance practically identical with that of the regular cycle plays").

The play is often considered the best of Middle English Abraham plays, humane in its treatment of infanticide, inventive in its language; Lucy Toulmin Smith, a nineteenth-century editor, found it to be superior to others of the period on the same subject and in the twentieth century George K. Anderson thought the play, its "human qualities" and characterisation, "unusually good", and Gassner thought it "a masterpiece". Adams noted that it was often reprinted due to its being "justly regarded as the best example of pathos in the early religious drama".

== Productions ==
The Brome Abraham was performed in 1980 by Poculi Ludique Societas in Toronto.

== Editions ==
- Non-Cycle Plays and Fragments, ed. by Norman Davis, Early English Text Society (London: Oxford University Press, 1970).
- Everyman and Medieval Miracle Plays, ed. by A. C. Cawley, Everyman's Library, 381 (London: Dent, 1922) [new edn. 1993].
- The Brome Play Of Abraham And Isaac. At From Stage to Page – Medieval and Renaissance Drama. NeCastro, Gerard, ed.
- 'Abraham and Isaac', in Drama from the Middle Ages to the Early Twentieth Century: An Anthology of Plays with Old Spelling, ed. by Christopher J. Wheatley (Washington, D.C.: The Catholic University of America Press, 2016), pp. 14–25.
- 'The Brome Play of Abraham and Isaac', in The Norton Anthology of English Literature: Norton Topics Online.
