= Still Falls the Rain =

Still Falls the Rain may refer to:

- "Still Falls the Rain", a 1941 poem by Edith Sitwell
- Canticle III: Still falls the rain, a 1954 composition by Benjamin Britten, based on the Sitwell poem, for tenor, French horn and piano
- "Still Falls The Rain", a 1979 track on Manifesto (Roxy Music album)
