= Waldemar Seidel =

Australian musician

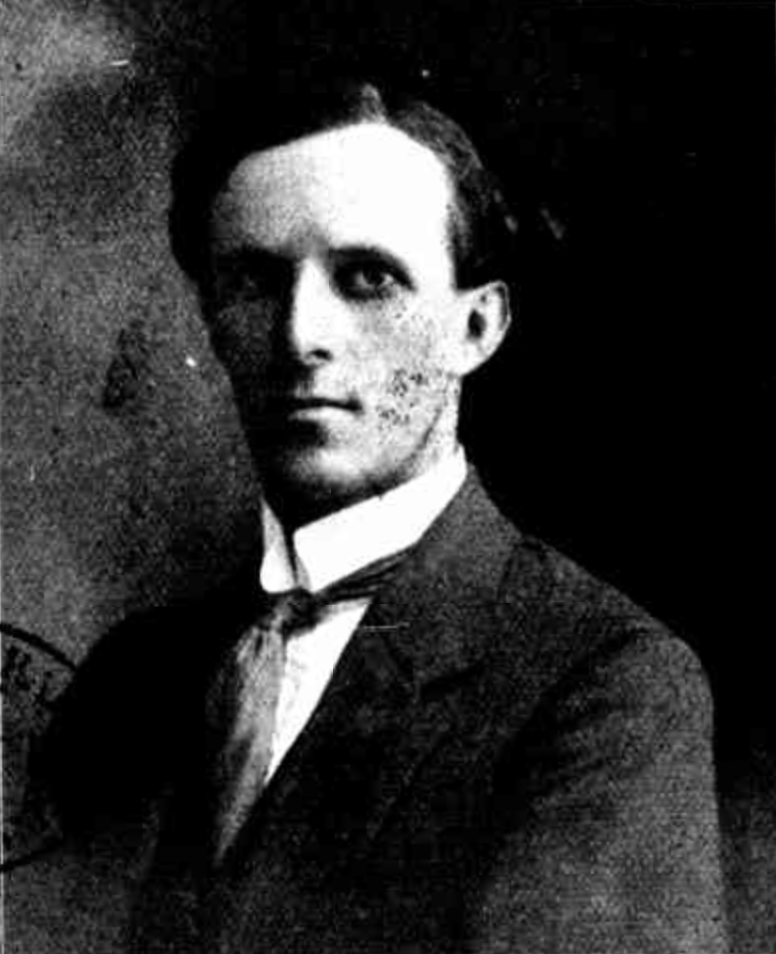
Seidel in Melbourne in 1913

Waldemar "Wally" Carl Seidel (11 March 1893 – 17 September 1980) was an Australian pianist, accompanist, and piano teacher who taught many notable pianists from Australia.

== Biography ==
Seidel was born in St Kilda, Victoria in 1893, son of a German immigrant, the pianist and choral conductor Alfred Carl Seidel. Alfred had graduated from the Royal Conservatorium of Music, Leipzig, and migrated to Australia at the age of 19. Waldemar had lessons from his father, from J. Alfred Johnstone, from Benno Scherek, and from Edward Goll (a pupil of Emil von Sauer, who was in turn a pupil of Franz Liszt; Goll's other students included Margaret Sutherland and Linda Phillips). Seidel assumed all of Johnstone's pupils when he returned to England in 1924.

As an accompanist he worked with notable singers such as Amy Castles and Stella Power. In 1925 he joined the staff of the Albert Street Conservatorium, East Melbourne, and in 1931 Bernard Heinze appointed him to the staff of the University of Melbourne Conservatorium, where he taught for the next 43 years, retiring in 1974. He continued to teach privately in retirement.

His students included Don Banks, Douglas Gamley, Peggy Glanville-Hicks, Noel Mewton-Wood, Glen Carter-Varney, Phyllis Batchelor, May Clifford, Bernice Lehmann and Margaret Schofield. In 1962 he auditioned the seven-year-old Geoffrey Tozer, declaring that Noel Mewton-Wood (who had died in 1953, the year before Tozer was born) had "come back". Seidel also taught many blind pianists, and passed on his skill to others.

He died in 1980, aged 87, survived by his wife and two sons.
