= Edward Goll =

Bohemian pianist and teacher

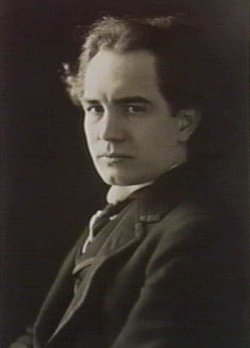
Edward Goll

Edward Goll (4 February 1884 – 11 January 1949) was a Bohemian pianist who settled in Australia in the 1910s and became a noted piano teacher at the Melbourne University Conservatorium of Music. His students included Margaret Sutherland, Waldemar Seidel and Dot Mendoza. He was also the target of anti-German feeling during World War I, despite having become a British subject at the start of the war.

== Biography ==
Edward Goll was born in 1884 in Kaaden, Bohemia, Austro-Hungarian Empire (now Kadaň, Czech Republic). His first instrument was the violin, which he studied under Otakar Ševčík; he gave his first concert at the age of nine. He entered the Prague Conservatory, where his focus changed to the piano, and where he was one of only a handful of personal students of Antonín Dvořák. He later had tuition from Emil von Sauer, a student of Franz Liszt. Goll was considered a wunderkind in his time, and often played for Queen Marie of Romania, who showered him with honours and gifts.

At the age of 20 he was appearing in concerts in Paris under Arthur Nikisch and in London under Hans Richter and Henry J. Wood. He later formed a piano trio with the violinist Jan Kubelík and the cellist Leopold Schwab, with whom he toured Europe.

In 1911, Edward Goll was accompanist to the Welsh tenor Ben Davies on his tour of Australia. In Melbourne he fell in love with a local widow, and they married early the following year, honeymooning in England, and making Melbourne their home. In 1915 Henri Verbrugghen, the inaugural Director of the New South Wales State Conservatorium of Music in Sydney, offered Goll a post there, but he accepted an alternative offer from the University of Melbourne Conservatorium, and also became musical director for Presbyterian Ladies' College, Melbourne.

He became a British subject in August 1914, a week after the outbreak of World War I. Despite this, his Germanic background led to a campaign of press vilification and a petition demanding that PLC dismiss him. The petition was rejected. After the war, Goll took refresher lessons from Eugen d'Albert in Europe and toured in the United States with the Minneapolis Symphony Orchestra and Henri Verbrugghen. Another American tour was planned to follow World War II, but this was abandoned.

He was an advocate for constant and unremitting practice; he was said to have spent five weeks practising one line of music. His students at the Conservatorium included Margaret Sutherland, Waldemar Seidel (the teacher of Noel Mewton-Wood, Don Banks, Peggy Glanville-Hicks and others), Nancy Weir, George Vern Barnett and Linda Phillips.

In the early 1930s he left the Conservatorium after a disagreement. He left PLC in 1935, and taught privately for the rest of his life. His private students included Judy Hall. He died in 1949, aged 64.

From as early as 1902 Goll made a large number of 78 recordings, now held by the National Library of Australia, but very few are currently available; his recording of two pieces by Max Reger has been released on CD.

Cyril Scott's 1912 realisation of Sumer Is Icumen In was dedicated to Edward Goll.

The musicologist Elina Yasumoto has written a memoir titled Edward Goll: A Light in Dark Times.
