= Rigo =

Rigo may refer to:

== People ==
- Rigo 23, a Portuguese artist active in San Francisco, California
- Blessed Rigo, also known as Henry of Treviso, a medieval Italian saint
- Frank Rigo (c. 1868–1936), American opera director in Australia
- Marek Rigo, a Slovak footballer
- Ondrej Rigo, the most prolific serial killer in the history of Slovakia
- Rigo Tovar, a Mexican cumbia singer
- Rigoberto 'Rigo' Urán, a Colombian professional road cyclist

== Other ==
- Staff (music) (from Italian usage)
- Rīga, the capital of Latvia
- Rigó (Hungarian) may refer to the bird Fekete rigó (Common blackbird, Turdus merula) or to the pastry Rigó Jancsi
- Rigo (TV series), a Colombian television series based on the life of the Colombian professional road cyclist
