= Stella Power =

Australian soprano (1896–1977)

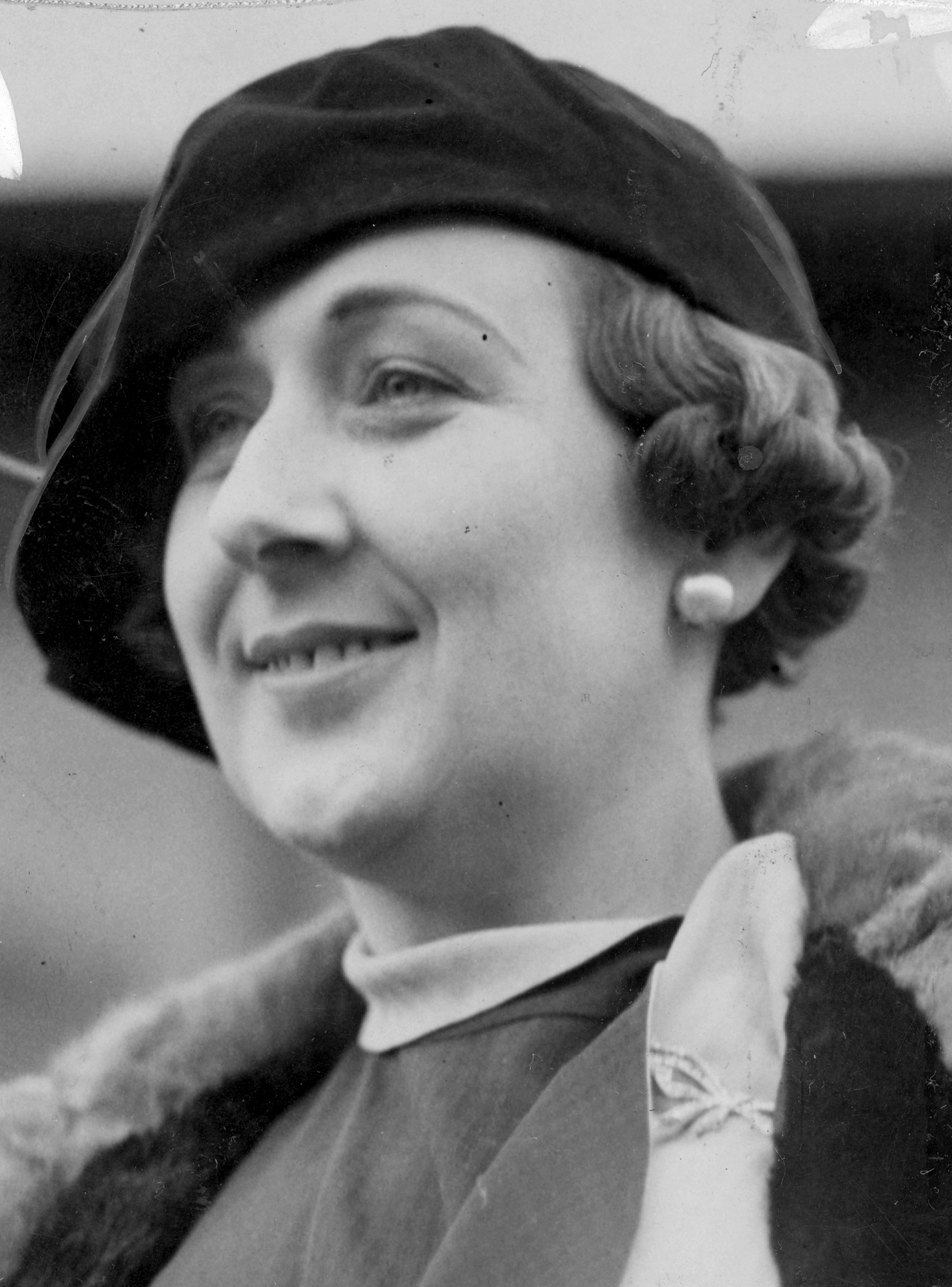
Stella Power, c.1934

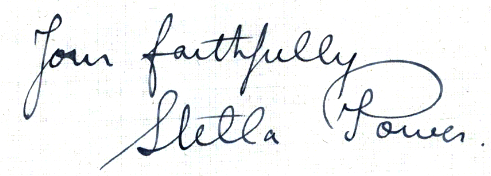
Her signature

Tertia Stella Power (27 June 1896 – 16 January 1977) was an Australian coloratura soprano, a protégée of Nellie Melba. She has been referred to as the "Little Melba".

== Early life and education ==
Power was born in Camperdown, Victoria, to customs officer Edward John Power and Annie Elizabeth Power, née O'Brien. (died 9 September 1904). Her sisters include (Dorothy Veronica) Ita Power, who married John T. Hassett on 8 June 1918, and Ergoule Mary Josephine Power, who married John's brother Michael J. Hassett on 24 March 1923. The family was closely identified with the Catholic faith.

She was educated at a convent, where her vocal talents were recognised, and she won a scholarship to Nellie Melba's Conservatorium singing school in Albert Street, East Melbourne, where she became a favorite of Melba, and according to one account, was dubbed "the Little Melba" by Melba herself. Another has her given that cognomen while appearing at The Auditorium, Melbourne under the management of the Tait brothers, for her light soprano voice and wide range (B below middle-C to F and G in alt).

== Career ==
In 1917 she received an invitation from Melba, who was in America, to join her there. Her farewell concert at the Melbourne Town Hall on 26 November was well-attended and enthusiastic, and she arrived in San Francisco accompanied by her teacher Mary Campbell, a month later. Melba was there to meet them. She made her American debut in Philadelphia, then sang with the Boston Symphony Orchestra, followed by a tour with violinists Eugène Ysaÿe and Mischa Elman. Her tour ended in Los Angeles, to sing with Melba. While in America, she was recorded by Thomas A. Edison, Inc., and on a later tour of England she was recorded by His Master's Voice.

Melba returned to Melbourne in June 1918, shortly after Power, who with fellow-protégée Beryl Fanning was among the first to welcome her. Power was the chief attraction of a concert at The Auditorium, applauded by public and critics alike. In August 1918 she had a second farewell concert at The Auditorium, again rapturously applauded, but critics found more interest in John Amadio's flute and the vocal contributions of Norman Bradshaw, Dorothy Murdoch and Frederick Mewton than Power's "birdlike top notes and dainty trills". Though it was billed as a farewell concert, she did not leave Melbourne for another year. She married William O'Rourke on 17 December 1918 and the couple left for a honeymoon in Cremorne, Sydney. She gave a series of Sydney concerts before taking a holiday in the Northern Rivers region. She had another farewell concert, at the Melbourne Town Hall—another triumph, again aided by Amadio, and with soloists Joseph Foster and Ivy Phillips, with accompanist Waldemar Seidel, then left for London via New York.

Her London debut was on 23 November 1919, when she appeared at the Royal Albert Hall with Landon Ronald's orchestra. Australian newspapers were given an anodyne report of her success, when The Times said her refined voice was lost in the vastness of the Hall. Melba felt betrayed by her protégée, in whom she had invested so much, but then she gave birth to a son, and Melba was mollified. Power remained in England for three years, touring provincial cities, at times sharing the stage with Jean Gerardy, Lauri Kennedy, John McCormack, Wilhelm Backhaus, and Jan Kubelík. She appeared at the Queen's Hall 24 times for Henry Wood, and the Albert Hall 49 times. She sang for Georg Schnéevoigt and the Society Konsert Föreningen in Stockholm, and the Christiania Philharmonic Orchestra and Bergen Philharmonic Society in Norway. She also sang with the Boston Symphony Orchestra in the US. She returned to Melbourne in April 1923 by the SS Osterley, accompanied by her son, her accompanist William G. James, and his wife Saffo Arnav.

In 1926 she returned to America on a ten-year contract to Paramount Pictures to sing in picture theatres, touring for 45 weeks a year and performing four or five shows every day. Hard work and highly lucrative but no articles discuss the cost of living in New York with a son and no partner. This was a period of dramatic change in the theatre — silent movies gave way to talkies and jazz began to dominate entertainment venues, and finally the Great Depression was starting to eat into the household economy. Power returned to Melbourne in August 1934, ostensibly for a six-month break. Others assumed the ten-year contract was ended. She made many appearances for the Australian Broadcasting Commission, many accompanied by the flautist C. Richard Chugg.

In 1937 she gave live concerts on ABC radio 3AR with fellow-Melburnian Frederick Collier. Radio work for the ABC continued — light operas with Dino Borgioli, produced in Sydney: Flotow's Martha, Don Giovanni, The Barber of Seville, Don Pasquale in 1938, With the outbreak of war she retired, "to take care of her family" said one biographer. Power did however take part in one of the series of eight operas in eight weeks for the ABC in 1940: Lucia di Lammermoor with the tenor Lawrence Power. She sang a radio concert with Browning Mummery shortly after.

In 1946–1947 she took the singing parts of the mature Melba, with a full orchestra conducted by Hector Crawford, in the radio serial Melba, first broadcast on radio station 3DB.

== Personal ==
Power married William O'Rourke at St Patrick's Cathedral, Melbourne on 17 December 1918. O'Rourke, an amateur vocalist, was a representative of the Sydney firm Petersen, Boesen and Co. Power received a monogrammed suitcase as a wedding gift from Melba.

They had one son, William Hugh Edward "Billy" O'Rourke, (Note: Billy lived with his mother until 1923, when he was given into the care of his aunt Ita and uncle John Hassett. When Power accepted the Paramount contract, she took Billy to New York, where he was educated, passing the New York State Graduation Certificate on 4 June 1934, and returned to Melbourne age 14 (with his mother?), initially living with his aunt Ita. He found work as a junior clerk with Hoyts Theatres Ltd, later with Aurora Packing Company, Ilrymple while living with aunt Ergoule, (during which time he joined the RAAF militia at Mildura), and Myer Emporium, before on 16 July 1940 enlisting with the rank of airman with the RAAF. His father was named as next of kin but it was his mother's signature on his attestation papers. He changed his name by declaration from William Hugh Edward O'Rourke to William Power on 21 August 1940, In 1941 he married Kathleen Mary Johnson of Moonee Ponds. After the war he was employed as a salesman. It is recorded that he survived his mother.) born in London on 29 May 1920.

Power died at a private hospital on Charmain Road, Cheltenham, Victoria. She was buried at the Cheltenham Memorial Cemetery.
