= Fulgens and Lucrece =

15th-century play by Henry Medwall

Fulgens and Lucrece is a late 15th-century interlude by Henry Medwall. It is the earliest purely secular English play that survives. Since John Cardinal Morton, for whom Medwall wrote the play, died in 1500, the work must have been written before that date. It was probably first performed at Lambeth Palace in 1497, while Cardinal Morton was entertaining ambassadors from Spain and Flanders. The play is based on a Latin novella by Buonaccorso da Montemagno that had been translated into English by John Tiptoft, 1st Earl of Worcester and published in 1481 by William Caxton. The play was printed in 1512–1516 by John Rastell, and was later only available as a fragment until a copy showed up in an auction of books from Lord Mostyn's collection in 1919. Henry E. Huntington acquired this copy, and arranged the printing of a facsimile. The play is an example of a dramatised débat.

== Sources ==
The source of the play is the Latin treatise De Vera Nobilitate (On True Nobility) by the Italian humanist Bonaccorso or Buonaccorso da Montemagno of Pistoia, written in 1438. This treatise had been translated into French by Jean Miélot as Controversie de Noblesse par Surse de Pistoye and printed by William Caxton's friend, Colard Mansion, in Bruges around 1475. The French version was later translated into English by John Tiptoft, 1st Earl of Worcester and printed by Caxton in 1481, on the last pages of Cicero of Old Age and Friendship. Medwall used Tiptoft's translation as his source.

De Vera Nobilitate tells how Lucretia, the daughter of the Roman senator Fulgentius, is wooed by the idle patrician Publius Cornelius and the studious plebeian Gaius Flaminius. Lucretia asks her father for advice, and Fulgentius asks the senate to decide on the matter. Each suitor then pleads before the senate. The senate's decision is not mentioned in the treatise.

== Plot ==
The plot is set in ancient Rome and deals with the wooing of Lucrece, daughter of the Roman senator Fulgens, by Publius Cornelius, a patrician, and Gaius Flaminius, a plebeian. They both plead their worthiness to Lucrece (and not to the senate, as in Medwall's source). Despite Publius' superficial charms, wealth, and noble background, Lucrece eventually chooses the modest commoner Gaius Flaminius. He does not have a famous lineage like Publius but his honest love for Lucrece shows his true nobility.

The play also contains a comic subplot which appears to begin outside the play and then merges with it. In this subplot, the characters A and B discuss a play that they expect to see, and B relates the plot, which is actually the plot of De Vera Nobilitate. A and B later turn out to be servants of Cornelius and Gaius, and they try to win the love of Joan, a handmaid of Lucrece.

The comic subplot and Lucrece's final choice were additions by Medwall. It disrupts the flow of the story as the mischievous comic relief characters A and B steal the audience's attention with their gags and breaking of the fourth wall. Medwall ingeniously uses A and B to subtly mock the idea of class and lordship, with the play asking if nobility can be found in the common man? A and B also make references to their fashion with A mistaking B for an actor because of his fine clothing, suggesting that actors were gaining a greater status in England around that time.

This is considered to be the first inclusion of a subplot in an English Language drama, and thus, in many ways, exceeds the main plot in critical discussion.

== Productions ==
The first modern revival of Fulgens and Lucres was by the Group Theatre of London, at the Everyman Theatre, Hampstead in March 1932.§ There have since been several productions, including one in 1984 by the Joculatores Lancastrienses during a Medieval English Theatre conference dinner in Christ's College Hall, Cambridge, directed by Meg Twycross. Fulgens and Lucres was recently produced by Poculi Ludique Societas the Centre for Drama, Theatre and Performance Studies at the University of Toronto, 8–16 Nov. 2014. The production was directed by Matthew Milo Sergi, Professor of Early English Drama at the University of Toronto.

Poster from the 2014 production of Fulgens and Lucres at the University of Toronto

== Editions ==
- F. S. Boas & A. W. Reed, eds.: Fulgens & Lucres. A fifteenth-century secular play. (Tudor and Stuart Library). Clarendon Press, 1926.
- Five Pre-Shakespearean Comedies: Fulgens and Lucrece, The Four P.P., Ralph Roister Doister, Gammer Gurton's Needle, Supposes Oxford University Press, 1958.
- Alan H. Nelson, ed.: The Plays of Henry Medwall (Tudor Interludes). D. S. Brewer, 1980. ISBN 0-85991-054-7.
- Fulgens and Lucres. The Henry E. Huntington Facsimile Reprints, 1. George D. Smith, 1920.
- Seymour de Ricci (Foreword): Fulgens and Lucres. Kessinger Publishing, 2007. ISBN 978-0-548-72623-5.
- Oxford Text Archive: English 362: Henry Medwall's Fulgens and Lucres (complete text).
- From Stage to Page: Medieval & Renaissance Drama (University of Maine at Machias): Full text (plain text format).
