= The Burlington Magazine =

Monthly art journal (founded 1903)

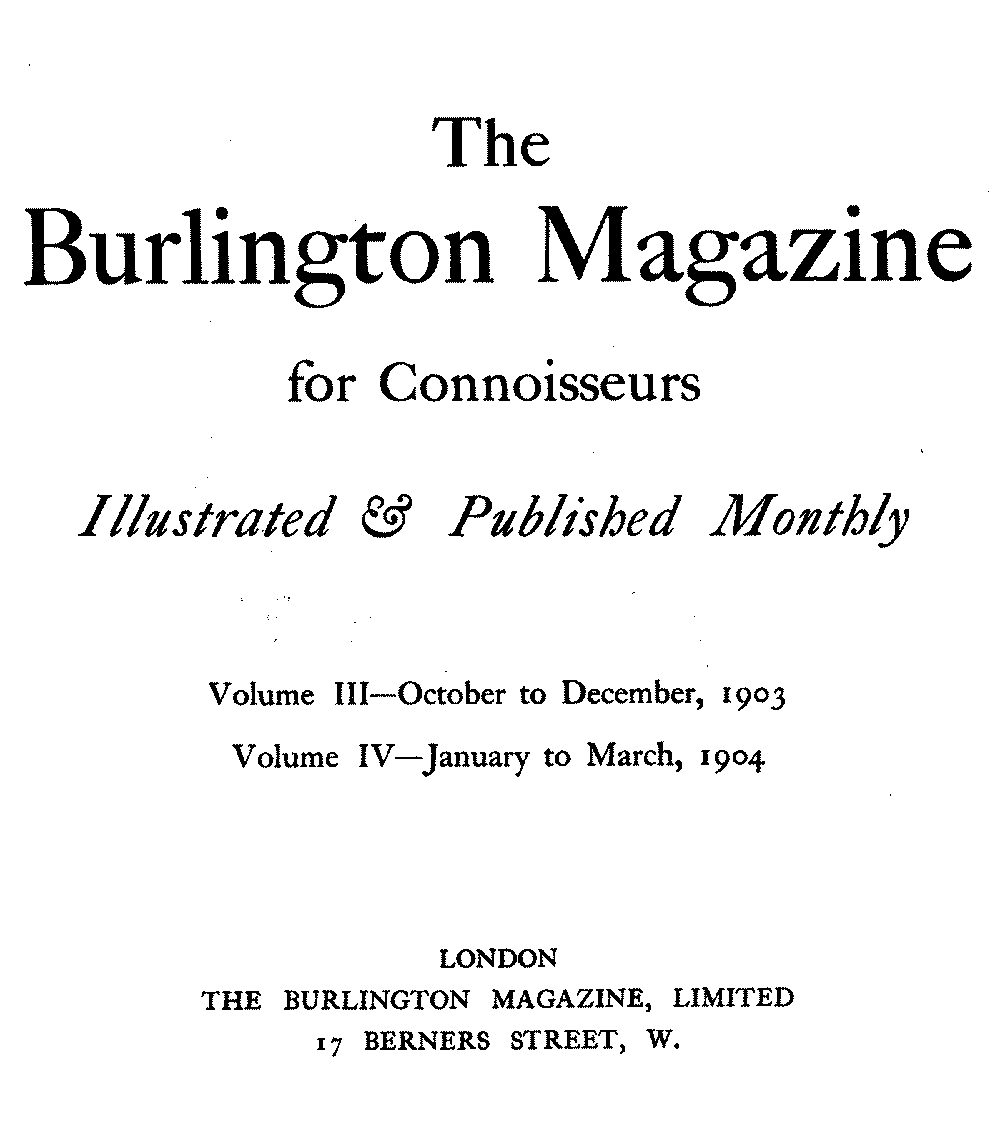
- Discipline: Art
- Language: English
- Edited by: Christopher Baker

Publication details
- History: 1903–present
- Publisher: The Burlington Magazine Publications
- Frequency: Monthly

Standard abbreviations
- ISO 4: Burlingt. Mag.

Indexing
- ISSN: 0007-6287
- JSTOR: 00076287

Links
- Journal homepage; Online index

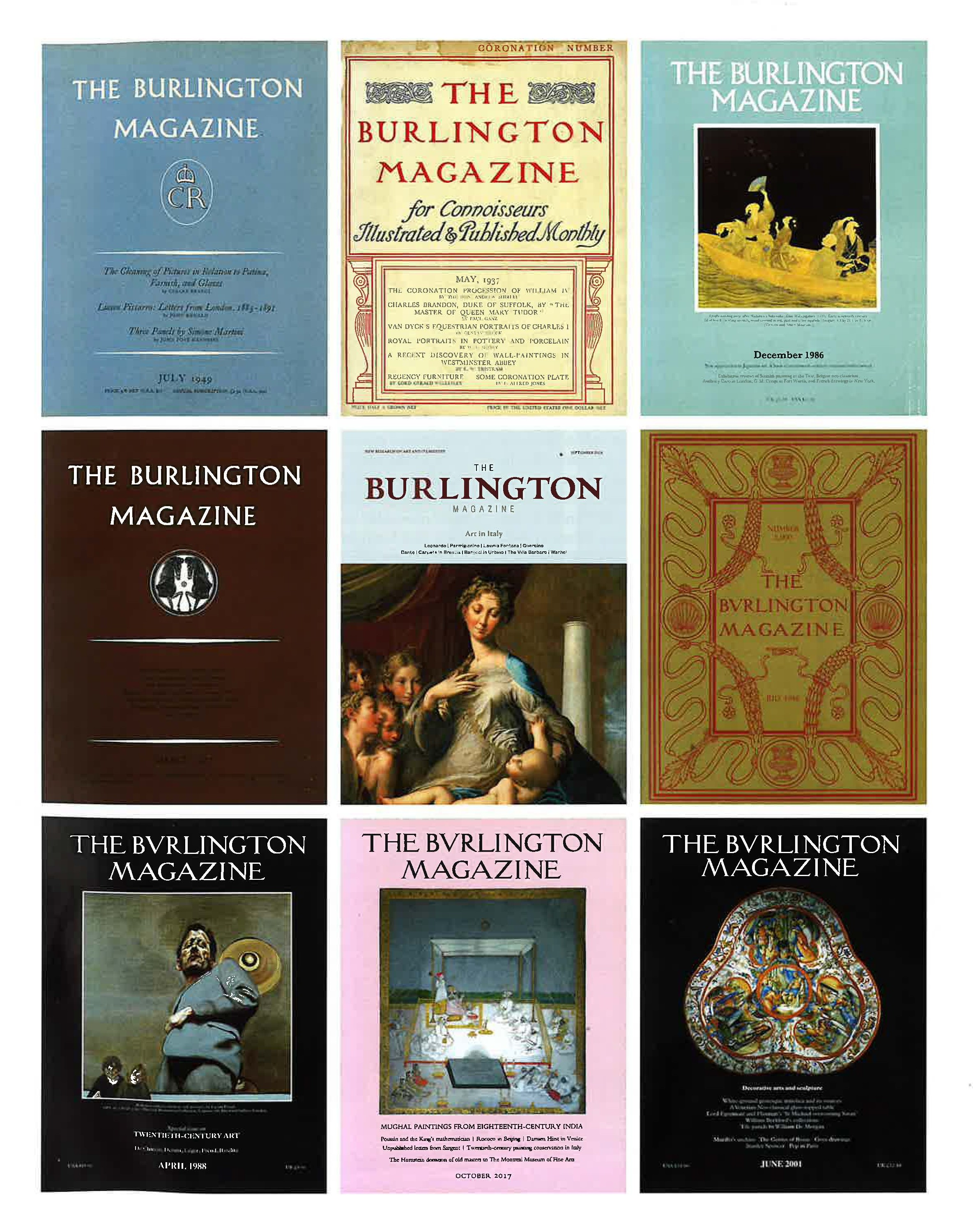
A selection of historical issues of The Burlington Magazine.

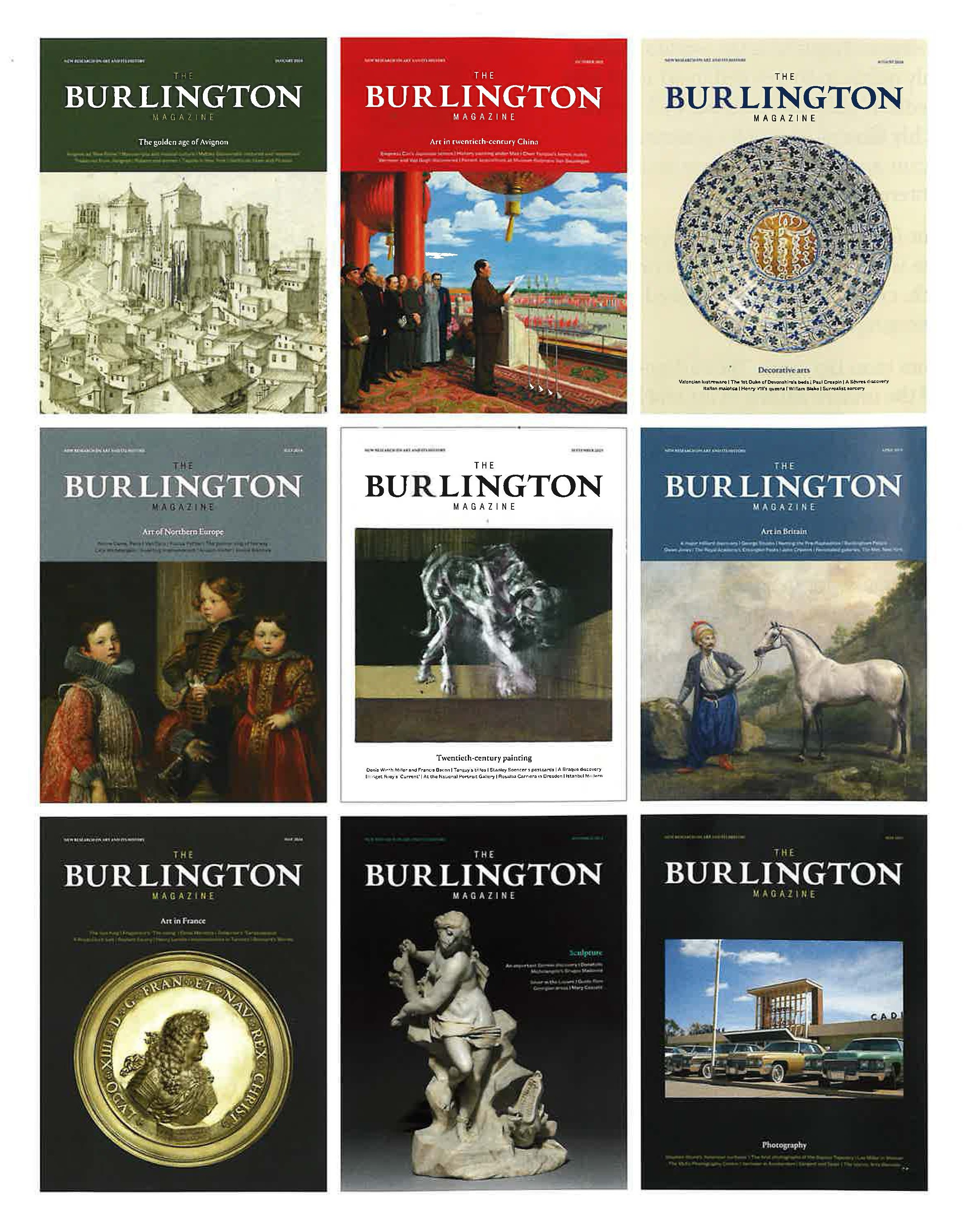
A selection of themed issues of The Burlington Magazine.

The Burlington Magazine is a British monthly publication that covers the fine and decorative arts of all periods. Established in 1903 as The Burlington Magazine for Connoisseurs, it is the longest running and most distinguished art journal in the English language. It has been published by a charitable organisation since 1986. From 2018 it has also published the online, open-access contemporary art platform, Burlington Contemporary.

== History ==
The magazine was established in 1903 by a group of art historians and connoisseurs which included Roger Fry, Herbert Horne, Bernard Berenson, and Charles Holmes. Its most esteemed editors have been Roger Fry (1909–1919), Herbert Read (1933–1939), and Benedict Nicolson (1948–1978). It was originally headquartered in New Burlington Street, London, near Burlington House, the home of the Royal Academy of Arts.

The journal's structure was based on its contemporary British publication The Connoisseur, which was mainly aimed at collectors and had connections with the art market. The Burlington Magazine, however, added to this late Victorian tradition of market-based criticism new elements of historical research inspired by the leading academic German periodicals and created a formula that has remained almost intact to date: a combination of authoritative archival and object-based art historical research juxtaposed with current art news, exhibitions and sales. The lavishness of the publication almost immediately created financial troubles and in January 1905 Fry embarked on an American tour to find sponsorship to assure the survival of the journal, which he had quickly recognized as a magazine for the developing study of art history.

== Content ==
From its first editorial, The Burlington Magazine presented itself as synthesising opposing traditions – historicist versus aestheticism and academic versus commercial – by defining itself an exponent of "Austere Epicureanism". The Burlington Magazine was to act as a disinterested guide, directing attention to high-quality art on offer both on the market and in institutional settings and thereby educating its readers.

The Burlington Magazine editors and contributors have been part of the institutional sphere of museums and academia and yet, unlike their German counterparts, they have participated in some cases in the emerging world of the commercial galleries. The magazine remained independent from any institution and was instrumental in the establishment of academic art history in Britain: its dynamic between the market and institutions contributed to the creation of an original, multifaceted, and influential publication.

The Burlington Magazine was founded as a journal of historic art but already in its first decade, especially under the editorship of Fry, articles on modern art became prominent. Topics covered in detail were: Paul Cézanne and Post-Impressionism in a debate between Fry and D. S. MacColl, a debate on a bust of Flora ascribed to Leonardo da Vinci and later discovered to be a forgery, and the role of archival research in the art historical reconstruction, with contributions by Herbert Horne and Constance Jocelyn Ffoulkes.

The Burlington Magazine, especially in its first decades, was also preoccupied with the definition and development of formal analysis and connoisseurship in the visual arts and consistently observed, reviewed and contributed to the body of attributions to various artists, notably Rembrandt, Poussin, and Caravaggio.

The journal has also had many notable contributions by artists on other artists, such as Walter Sickert on Edgar Degas.

Other contributors have included Henry James, Osbert Sitwell, Howard Hodgkin, Ernst Gombrich and Bridget Riley.

The entirety of the magazine, dating back to 1903, has been digitised and is available via subscription.

In addition to the core responsibilities of the magazine, The Burlington is now also home to a range of other initiatives which complement its focus on the encouragement and sharing of outstanding art historical research: scholarships, prizes, annual lectures and the publication of books, through the Burlington Press.

== Production ==
The journal is published monthly, and features a wide range of writers, from established figures to emerging art historians.

The first issues of The Burlington Magazine were printed on high-quality paper, had a typeface designed by Herbert Horne and were richly illustrated with black and white photographs, many by the arts and crafts photographer Emery Walker.

== Editors ==
- Robert Dell: March–December 1903
- Charles Holmes and Robert Dell: January 1904 – October 1906
- Charles Holmes: October 1906 – September 1909
- Harold Child Assistant Editor with the advice of a Consultative Committee: October and November 1909
- Roger Fry and Lionel Cust: December 1909 – December 1913
- Roger Fry, Lionel Cust, and More Adey: January 1914 – May 1919
- John Hope-Johnstone: July 1919 – December 1920
- Robert R. Tatlock: Early 1921 – 1933
- Herbert Read: 1933–1939
- Albert C. Sewter: 1939–1940
- Tancred Borenius: 1940–1944
- Edith Hoffmann (Assistant Editor who ran the Magazine with advice from Read): 1944–1945
- Ellis Waterhouse acting editor (the magazine was officially without an editor): 1945–1947
- Benedict Nicolson: 1947 – July 1978
- Editorial Board of Directors: August–October 1978
- Terence Hodgkinson: November 1978 – August 1981
- Neil MacGregor: September 1981 – February 1987
- Caroline Elam: March 1987 – July 2002
- Andrew Hopkins: August 2002 – December 2002
- Richard Shone and Bart Cornelis (joint editors): January 2003 – March 2003
- Richard Shone: March 2003 – September 2015
- Frances Spalding: September 2015 – August 2016
- Jane Martineau: acting editor August 2016 – May 2017
- Michael Hall: May 2017 – December 2023
- Christopher Baker: January 2024 – present
