= Fred Collier =

Australian bass baritone (1885–1964)

Frederic or Frederick Redmond Collier (5 October 1885 – 14 October 1964) was an Australian bass baritone who had an international career in grand opera.

== History ==
Collier was born to Catherine Collier, née Redmond (died 21 August 1925) and Daniel Henry Collier (died 9 November 1923) at their home "Rotherhithe", Easey Street, Collingwood, Victoria. His father had a coach building business at 225 Johnston Street, Collingwood.

Collier had a fine baritone voice, and was a member of the choir of St Philip's Church of England, Collingwood, and took lessons from organist Arthur Nickson. From 1909 to 1919 he was a soloist at St Patrick's (Catholic) Cathedral.

In 1908 he competed successfully in a vocal competition run by the Australian Natives Association at the Athenaeum Hall, Melbourne. Two years later he married a fellow-competitor, Elsy Treweek (often spelled "Elsie"). They would later appear together in concerts.

In 1919 he joined Frank Rigo's Grand Opera Company, appearing in La bohème alongside Guido Cacciali and A. C. Bartleman, with Vittorio Lois as Rodolfo. This company, which previously used an English libretto, had moved towards the Italian, only Collier, as Schaunard, singing in English.

In 1921 he left for London, and in 1922 was appointed principal bass-baritone with the British National Opera. He returned to Melbourne in 1934, and in January 1935 played Mephistopheles to Browning Mummery's Faust at Sir Benjamin Fuller's Tivoli Theatre, Sydney.

In 1937 he played in Elija with the Melbourne Philharmonic Society under Bernard Heinze, Essie Ackland's first appearance in opera since her return to Australia. Later that year he gave live concerts with Stella Power, broadcast on ABC radio.

== Family ==
Collier married the soprano Elsy Treweek (died 3 November 1953) on 13 January 1910. They had a daughter on 5 November 1910.

A brother, W. G. Collier, was also a fine vocalist, a tenor trained by Arthur Nickson and A. C. Bartleman.

He was not related to Marie Collier.
