= Ulpian Fulwell =

16th-century English playwright, satirist, and poet

Ulpian Fulwell (1545/6 – before 1586) was an English Renaissance theatre playwright, satirist and poet. Later as a Gloucestershire parish priest, he appears to have neglected his duties.

== Church, stage and satire ==
Born one of the two sons of a linen draper in Wells, Somerset, Thomas Fulwell (died 1563), and his wife Christabel (née James, died 1584), he was ordained priest in 1566. In 1572 he married Eleanor Warde, who died in 1577. In 1578 he was remarried to Marie Whorwood, by whom he had six children. Only in 1578 did he manage to matriculate at St Mary Hall, Oxford, where he apparently graduated, as he was termed a master of arts in 1584.

Fulwell became Rector of Naunton, near Stow-on-the-Wold, Gloucestershire, in 1570, but appears to have been lax. It was noted at an episcopal visitation in 1572 that the church was in decay. Four years later he was fined because his clerk was found to be illiterate and local parents had ceased to send their children to catechism classes. All of Fulwell's own six children were baptised in Naunton, one of whom died in 1585. Fulwell himself was probably dead by 1586, when another man, Joseph Hanxman, was recorded as Rector of Naunton.

Fulwell's neglect of his parish and education may have been due to the attention he paid to his literary work. His first, Like Will to Like, Quod the Devil to the Collier (after 1566, first printed 1568), was one of several morality plays reliant on proverbs that appeared at that time. This play has been analysed in a study as exploring the themes of morality and vices in relation to the devil. It has also been credited with influencing a later play, Grim the Collier of Croydon, acted by Pembroke's Men at Henslowe's Rose Theatre on 28 October 1600. The Fulwell play was revived in 1968 and 1988 by the Poculi Ludique Societas of Toronto, Canada.

In 1575 Fulwell published a pro-Tudor piece of writing, The Flower of Fame dedicated to William Cecil, Lord Burghley. This was followed in 1576 by Ars adulandi, or, The Art of Flattery, a group of eight satires dedicated to Mildred, Lady Burghley. The criticisms were stringent enough for him to be ordered by the courts to make a recantation on 7 July 1576 before Gilbert Berkeley, Bishop of Bath and Wells. A revised edition appeared in 1579.

== Works ==
- Like Will to Like (published 1568)
- The Flower of Fame (1575), a chronicle of Henry VIII, with appendices in verse
- Ars adulandi, or, The Art of Flattery (1576), humorous dialogues

== External sources ==
- Buchanan, R. (editor and introduction): Ars adulandi, or, the art of flattery by Ulpian Fulwel [sic]: a critical edition with a biography of the author (Salzburg, Austria: University of Salzburg, 1984)
- The Dramatic Writings of Ulpian Fulwell (London: Early English Drama Society, 1906). Private publication for subscribers
