= Canticle I: My beloved is mine and I am his =

1947 composition by Benjamin Britten

- Vocal composition by Benjamin Britten
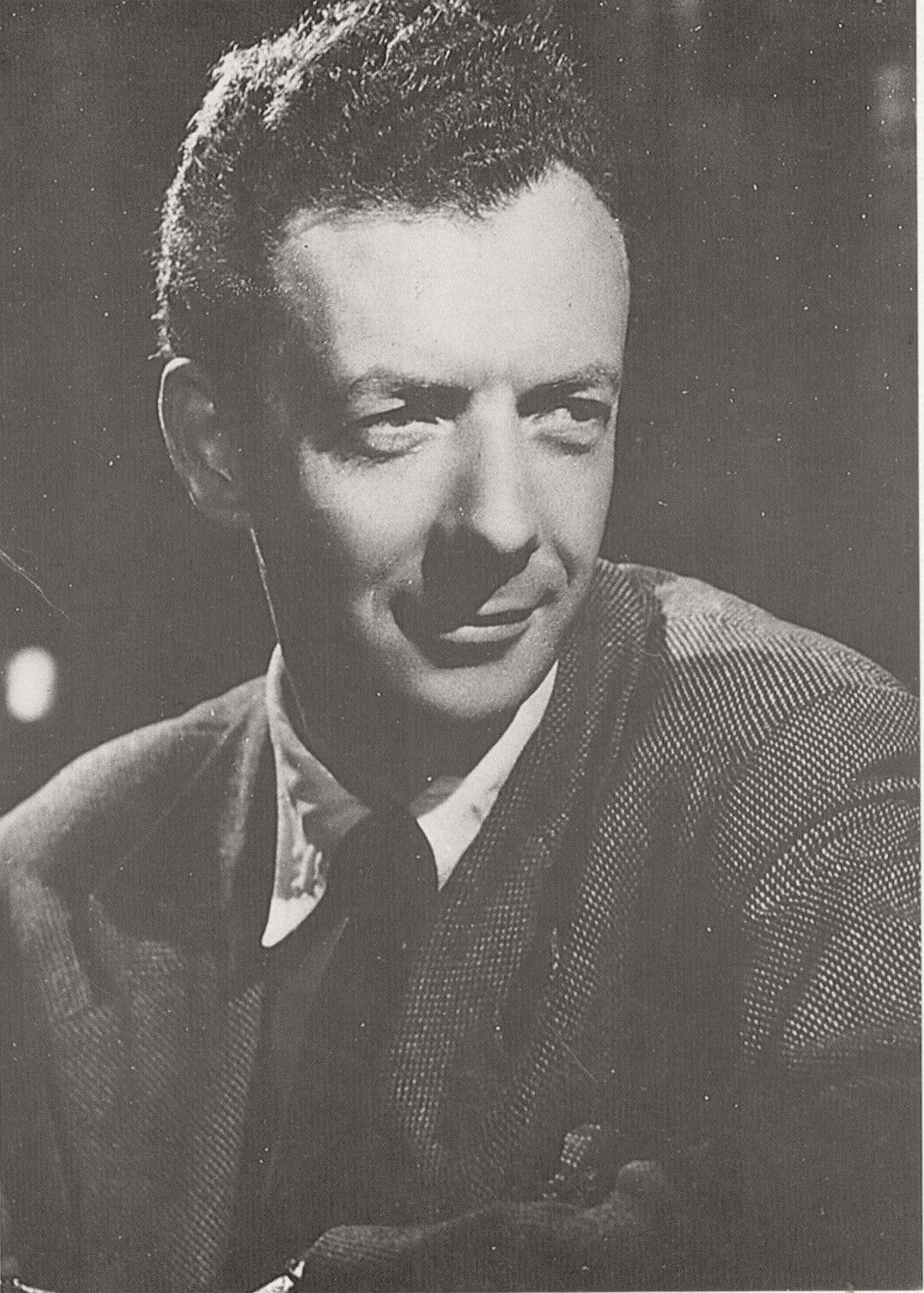
- Benjamin Britten in the 1940s
- Opus: 40
- Related: Canticles
- Occasion: Memorial concert for Dick Sheppard
- Text: by Francis Quarles
- Language: English
- Performed: 1 November 1947
- Duration: 7 min
- Scoring: tenor (or soprano); piano

Canticle I: My beloved is mine and I am his, Op. 40, is a composition for high voice and piano by Benjamin Britten, the first part of his series of five Canticles. It was composed for a memorial concert. The text is taken from Francis Quarles's poetry based on the biblical Song of Songs. It was published by Boosey & Hawkes under the shorter title Canticle I: My beloved is mine.

== Background and history ==
Britten composed his five Canticles over an extended period of almost 30 years, between 1947 and 1975. They have in common to be written for voices, all including a tenor with Peter Pears in mind, as a result of "the personal and creative relationship between Britten and his most important muse". All are set to religious but not biblical texts. The first such work was possibly titled Canticle because it set a paraphrase of verses from the Song of Songs, sometimes referred to as the Canticles. In the works, Britten followed the model of Purcell's Divine Hymns, and wrote music that can be seen as miniature cantatas, and as song cycles.

Canticle I: My beloved is mine and I am his was written in 1947 for a memorial concert for Dick Sheppard, who had been vicar at St Martin-in-the-Fields and had founded the Peace Pledge Union. The text was taken from A Divine Rapture by Francis Quarles, which is based on the biblical Song of Songs. Britten set My beloved is mine and I am his for high voice and piano.

On 1 November 1947, Pears and Britten performed the world premiere of the Canticle at the Methodist Central Hall, Westminster, as part of a memorial concert for Sheppard It was published by Boosey & Hawkes for high voice and piano. The duration is given as 7 minutes. Peter Pears wrote in 1952 that he regarded the Canticle as "Britten's finest piece of vocal music to date".

In 2017, the Canticle was featured in a Queer Talk exhibition, as "a work which bravely expresses same-sex love at a time when it was very dangerous to do so."

== Text and music ==
The text for Canticle I was taken from A Divine Rapture by Quarles, a paraphrase of sections from the Song of Songs from the Old Testament. It arrives several times at the refrain line "I my best beloved’s am – so he is mine". As already the original biblical poetry, it is "full of beautiful, sensuous imagery".

The piano writing evokes images like waves at a shore, paired with "expressive and sometimes highly melismatic freedom of vocal writing". Composed for Britten's partner Peter Pears, and performed by the two men in the first performance, it carries further meaning beyond an allegory of love of God and the Soul. Britten's biographer David Matthews described it as one of the composer's most serene works, which "ends in a mood of untroubled happiness that would soon become rare in Britten's music".

== Performances and recordings ==
Canticle I was performed, together with the other Canticles, in a concert at Wigmore Hall in London in 2012 by Mark Padmore and pianist Julius Drake. It was performed at the Proms in Britten's centenary year 2013, by James Gilchrist and pianist Imogen Cooper.

Canticle I was recorded in 1985 in a collection of vocal music by Britten, sung by Anthony Rolfe Johnson with pianist Graham Johnson. It was recorded, in a collection of all five canticles, by Naxos Records in 2005, Canticle I with tenor Philip Langridge and pianist Steuart Bedford. The five canticles were recorded again in 2012, with musicians around tenor Ben Johnson.
