= Sixt Birck =

German humanist (1501–1554)

Sixt (or Sixtus) Birck, as Xystus Betuleius (February 24, 1501 – June 19, 1554) was a German humanist of Augsburg, "a notable German scholar of the New Learning".

At the end of his schooling in Augsburg the Protestant Reformation began. He continued his theological studies at Erfurt, Tübingen and Basel before returning to Augsburg as director (Magister) of the Gymnasium.

== Works ==
His theatrical output is in both German and Neo-Latin: in Basel he produced a wide variety of German theater pieces with a Reformation subtext; in Augsburg he wrote a notable series of pedological school dramas in Latin, designed for student presentation and intended to improve morality and Latin alike.

Among his numerous plays in Latin are Susanna, (Augsburg 1537; Zurich 1538), originally written in German but recast in Latin so as to make an essentially new play; De vera nobilitate, a dramatized version of Buonaccorso da Montemagno's Dialogus de nobilitate concerning meritocracy and the inherent virtues of the nobility, recast by Betuleius in play form, still in Latin, and published at Augsburg in 1538; and Sapientia Solomonis ("the Wisdom of Solomon"), published at Basel in 1547; an adapted version was acted before Queen Elizabeth and Princess Cecilia of Sweden in their common language, Latin, 17 January 1565. Other Latin plays by Birck are direct translations of his German plays.

In 1545 Betuleius published at Basel an edition of eight books of the Sibylline oracles with a preface dating from perhaps the sixth century. As a philologist, he made his mark with the first Greek concordance to the New Testament which he published at Basel in 1546.
