= Henry Medwall =

English dramatist

Henry Medwall (8 September 1462 – c.1501/2?) was the first known English vernacular dramatist. Fulgens and Lucrece (c.1497), whose heroine must choose between two suitors, is the earliest known secular English play. The other play of Medwall is titled Nature. He stayed at the court of Cardinal Morton, Chancellor in the time of Henry VII.

== Life ==
Born in 1462, he was educated at Eton College from 1475, at age 13, and was admitted to King's College, Cambridge in 1480. He left King's in 1483. Under Henry VII he acted as a notary, and acquired a civil law degree. With a living at Balinghem in English Calais, he is assumed to have worked for John Morton at Lambeth Palace. He vanishes from the record after 1501.

== Works ==
Fulgens and Lucrece is based on a Latin work by Buonaccorso da Montemagno.

The other work of Medwall's that is extant is Nature. It is without date, place, or printer's name, but was printed by William Rastell. Nature was produced before Morton in Henry VII's reign; John Bale states that it was translated into Latin.

Another interlude that has been ascribed to Medwall, Of the Finding of Truth, carried away by Ignorance and Hypocrisy, was said to have introduced a fool, an innovation which commended it to Henry VIII when it was produced before him at Richmond, Christmas 1516; the king, however, left early. This is now thought to be a fabrication, perhaps by John Payne Collier.
