= Canticle III: Still falls the rain =

1954 vocal composition by Benjamin Britten

- Canticle by Benjamin Britten
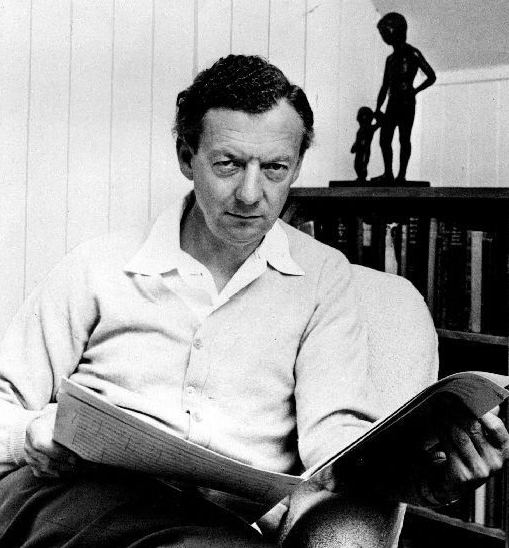
- Britten in 1968
- Opus: 55
- Text: poem by Edith Sitwell
- Language: English
- Composed: 1954
- Dedication: memory of Noel Mewton-Wood
- Performed: 1955
- Scoring: tenor; horn; piano

Canticle III: Still falls the rain, Op. 55, is a 1954 vocal composition by Benjamin Britten for tenor, horn and piano. It is part of his series Canticles.

== Composition and premiere ==
Britten composed Canticle III, Still falls the rain: The raids 1940. Night and dawn, to give its full title, in 1954 for a memorial concert for the pianist Noel Mewton-Wood. The concert was given at Wigmore Hall in January 1955. Canticle III was premiered by Peter Pears (tenor), Dennis Brain (French horn) and the composer on piano.

== Source poem ==
The poem on which Canticle III is based is by Edith Sitwell and was first published in 1941. It was written after the raids on London in 1940. The poem is dark, and full of the disillusions of World War II. It speaks of the failure of man, and of the yet unconditional love of God.

== Music ==
The structure of the piece is similar to that of the opera The Turn of the Screw which was premiered a few months before Canticle III. This structure is characterized by the alternation of an instrumental theme-and-variations (in the horn and piano) with six verses of text settings. The final instrumental variation is combined with the concluding text-verse setting. The theme of the variations is presented as an introduction, and consists of a sixteen-bar melody on the horn introducing all twelve notes. The theme has three phrases, the first consisting of five notes, and the second answering it in inversion. The remaining two notes are reserved for the final phrase, which also includes the five-note sequence and inversion from the preceding two phrases. The text is presented in a free recitative style with very few interventions by the piano, which emphasizes the poetry itself. The horn and tenor unite only at the very end, on a rhythmic unison, when the poem evokes the voice of God. A similar colouristic effect (rhythmic unison of the tenor and the alto) had been used in Canticle II: Abraham and Isaac to represent the voice of God talking to Abraham.
