= William G. James =

Australian composer, pianist and broadcaster (1892–1977)

William Garnet James OBE
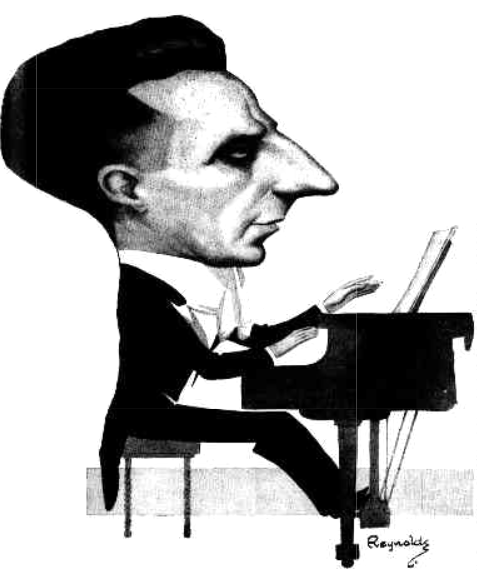
- 1928 caricature by Reynolds
- Born: 28 August 1892; Ballarat, Victoria, Australia
- Died: 10 March 1977 (aged 84); Sydney, New South Wales, Australia
- Occupations: Pianist, composer, broadcaster

William Garnet James OBE (28 August 1892 – 10 March 1977) was an Australian pianist and composer and a pioneer of music broadcasting in Australia.

== Early years ==
James was born in Ballarat in 1892. He studied piano at the Melbourne University Conservatorium, graduating in 1912. On the recommendation of the visiting pianist Teresa Carreño, he headed overseas to study in London and Brussels with Arthur De Greef, a former pupil of Franz Liszt and Camille Saint-Saëns. It is around this period that James composed his Six Australian Bush Songs, which were dedicated to, and performed by, Dame Nellie Melba.

After being rejected for military service, James worked for the British Red Cross during the World War I. In 1915, he made his public debut as a pianist with the Queen's Hall Orchestra. By this time he had begun to publish his compositions, and in 1916 his ballet music By Candlelight was performed in concert at the Savoy Theatre, London.

== ABC career ==
In 1923 James returned to Australia, in company with Stella Power, eventually taking up a teaching position at the Melbourne University Conservatorium. In the late 1920s, he joined the newly formed Australian Broadcasting Company, the forerunner of the Australian Broadcasting Commission (ABC). He became the latter's first Director of Music in 1931, a position he held until his retirement in 1957. It was during his tenure that the ABC established its state orchestras.

From 1935, James made regular overseas trips to persuade international artists to perform in Australia with the newly formed ABC orchestras. During World War II, when such exchanges became impractical, the ABC instead organised local talent competitions, which James adjudicated. His selection of repertoire for concert performances was conservative, possibly because he felt contemporary composers might not have a broad enough appeal for radio audiences.

== Compositions ==
James wrote many pieces for voice, choir and piano, but most enduring are his 15 Australian Christmas Carols in three sets, in which traditional Christmas themes were given outback settings, such as "The Three Drovers". ABC staff writer John Wheeler wrote the lyrics for these carols. The Australian Christmas Carols can still be found in music catalogues today. A fourth set of Australian Christmas Carols was written in the 1970s and given to the Wayside Chapel, Kings Cross. They have since disappeared.

Outback themes were common in his secular songs as well, in compositions such as "Bush Song at Dawn", familiar to many Australian children of the 1950s and 1960s through the school songbooks of the period. Other compositions by James have rustic English themes ("A Warwickshire Wooing") or claim Māori inspiration (Six Maori Dances).

== Honours and recognition ==
James was awarded the Coronation Medal in 1937. He was appointed an Officer of the Order of the British Empire in the 1960 Birthday Honours for "service to Australian culture".

== Personal life ==
James was married twice. His first marriage, in 1921, was to the Russian opera singer Saffo Buchanan, née Drageva, by whom he had a son and a daughter. Known professionally as Saffo Arnav, she had been briefly married to Jack Buchanan. She died in 1955, and in 1960 James married again, to widow Caroline Mary Dally-Watkins, née Skewes. They divorced in 1967.

== Sources ==
- "William G. James (1892–1977), Australian Music Centre
- William G. James, Music Australia website.
- Harold Hort (1996). "James, William Garnet (Billy) (1892–1977)". Australian Dictionary of Biography. Vol. 14. National Centre of Biography, Australian National University. ISBN 978-0-522-84459-7. ISSN 1833-7538. OCLC 70677943.
