= Linda Phillips (musician) =

Australian composer, pianist and music critic

Linda Phillips in about 1933

Rosalind Phillippa Phillips, OBE (8 June 1899 – 8 October 2002), known as Linda Phillips, was an Australian composer, pianist and music critic.

== Early life and education ==
Linda Phillips was born in Melbourne in 1899 to Joseph Phillips (1859 – 6 April 1929) who was born in Lithuania of Russian descent and became a naturalized Australian in 1891, and Augusta Polack (25 December 1872, Melbourne – 12 October 1940). She was the eldest child and had three brothers.

Linda Phillips attended Lauriston Girls' School. She then studied piano at the University of Melbourne's Conservatorium of Music under Edward Goll, and subsequently composition at the private Albert Street Conservatorium in East Melbourne (Melba Memorial Conservatorium of Music) where she studied under the English composer and conductor Fritz Hart.

== Career ==
Phillips was a popular composer and performer on Australian Broadcasting Corporation radio but was most well known as the music critic for The Sun News-Pictorial or Sun (Melbourne) newspaper (1949–1976).

She was Chief Adjudicator for the annual Sun Aria Contest, where she helped launch the careers of many singers including Dame Kiri Te Kanawa, who won the Contest in 1966. The Sun Aria (now Herald Sun Aria) is Australia's oldest and most prestigious prize for emerging opera singers. It forms the aria section of the Royal South Street Eisteddfod.

== Compositions ==
Phillips' compositions have been divided into two main styles, work in the English Pastoral style, and compositions influenced by ancient Judaic music. She wrote the lyrics of many of her songs. Her interest in poetry as a child led her to publish a collection of her poems in 1922, From a City Garden. Her compositions were performed by Dame Joan Sutherland, Dame Joan Hammond, and Sylvia Fisher.

Her compositions include:

Songs with lyrics from the poetry of James Joyce:

- Strings in the Earth and the Air
- The Twilight Turns from Amethyst
- Golden Hair
- Apple Trees
- Who Goes Amid the Greenwood
- Winds of May
- Bright Cap and Streamers
- Go Seek Her Out All Courteously
- Arise, My Dove
- Monotone
- The Charioteers (lyrics from "I Hear an Army" from Chamber Music).

Instrumental and chamber:

- Rhapsody-Sonata in G – for violin and piano
- Piano Suite, Sea Impressions: Waves, Mermaid and Harp, and The Dancing Sunlight
- Cradle Song
- Serenade for Violin and Piano
- Two Moods for Clarinet and Piano – Grave and Giocoso
- The Golden Bird
- Plum Tree
- Daydreams
- Bracken Brown
- Bush Evening
- Iris Marshes
- Shadow Dance
- Evening Canticle
- Serenade
- Festival Trio in D Minor
- Music from Lamentations – for violin, cello and piano
- Exaltation (Chassidic Air and Dance) – quartet for oboe, violin, cello and piano
- Purim
- Ash Trees
- Two Hebrew Songs

Her papers were donated to Monash University and these included her vocal music, piano music and chamber music works.

== Discography ==
- Recording made by the Australian Broadcasting Commission and processed by Columbia Gramophone (Australia.) Pty. Ltd. (78 r.p.m.). In each piece, the pianist is Linda Phillips. "The Wattle Tree", William Herbert (tenor), (ABX 235); "Bird Call" (from "Four Bush Songs"), William Herbert (tenor), (ABX 236); "Bracken Brown", William Herbert (tenor), (ABX 237); "Where the Coloured Parrot Flies" (from " Four Bush Lyrics"), William Herbert (tenor), (ABX 238); "The Charioteers", Sylvia Fisher, (ABX 240); "Monotone" and "Sea Child", Sylvia Fisher, (ABX 241); "Arise My Dove", Sylvia Fisher, (ABX 242); "Waves", (ABX 243); "The Dancing Sunlight", (ABX 244); "Ash Trees", Thea Phillips (Soprano), (ABX 253); "Cradle Song", Thea Phillips (Soprano); "To a Singing Bird" and "Cherry Blossom", Nance Osborne (soprano), (ABX 287); "The Swallows", Nance Osborne (soprano), (ABX 288).
- Recording made by the Australian Broadcasting Commission and processed by Columbia Gramophone (Australia) Pty. Ltd. (78 r.p.m.). "Rhapsodie Sonata" for violin and pianoforte (Parts 1 to 4), Lloyd Davies (Violin) and Clemens Leske (Piano); "Three Songs of the Outback": "Droving Song", Charles Skase (Baritone) and Linda Phillips (Piano); "The Settlers", Charles Skase (Baritone) and Linda Phillips (Piano); "Bourrée" for Flute and Piano, Richard Chugg (Flute) and Linda Phillips (Piano); "Rail Workers", Charles Skase (Baritone) and Linda Phillips (Piano).
- Recording made by the Australian Broadcasting Commission. "Songs by Australian Composers" (33 1/3 r.p.m.). "Bush Ballads": "The Wattle Tree"; "Bird Call"; "Bracken Brown"; "Where the Coloured Parrot Flies"; "Cradle Song"; and "Sea Child".
- Recording (78 r.p.m.) of "Orchard Zephyr". Music and lyrics by Linda Phillips. Kathleen Goodall (Soprano) and Linda Phillips (Piano).
- Australian Light Classics Performed by Leonard Dommett (violin), Eugene Danilov (clarinet), Muriel Luyk (mezzo contralto) and Linda Phillips (piano).
- Repose : lullabies and cradle songs by Australian composers 1890–1999 (1999) Cradle Song. Performed by Linda Thompson (soprano) and Deviani Segal (piano).
- Recital : Australian art song (2002) Cradle Song and Plum Tree. Performed by Merlyn Quaife, AM (soprano) and Michael Kieran Harvey (piano).
- The Red of a Woman's Heart : Australian Art Songs (2014) "Ash Trees" and "The Golden Bird". Performed by Lisa Harper-Brown (mezzo-soprano) and David Wickham (piano).
- Women of Note, Volume 2: A Century of Australian Composers (2020) "Exaltation (Chassidic Dance and Air)", Performed by Anne Gilby (oboe), Isin Cakmakcioglu (violin), Rachel Atkinson (cello) and Robert Chamberlain (piano).
- Composers' Series, The – Volume 7 Piano Solos (Phillips) (2020) Researched, edited and recorded by Jeanell Carrigan, AM. 19 piano solos.
- What Secret hath the Rose? A Linda Phillips Anthology (2022). Jeanell Carrigan, AM (piano), Goetz Richter, AM (violin), James Kortum (flute), Julie Jong Eun Barber (soprano), and Lewis Barber (tenor). 19 pieces.

== Honours ==
Linda Phillips was one of the four selected composers to celebrate the Victorian Jubilee Year in 1951. A recital of her works was held including chamber music, part songs, instrumental solos and songs.

She was an invited delegate at The International Conference of Women held in Venice in 1956 representing women composers in Victoria, Australia and was sponsored by the Press, Arts and Letters Sub-Committee of the National Council of Women in Victoria.

Phillips was appointed an Officer of the Order of the British Empire (OBE) on 14 June 1975 for services to music. The citation is "In recognition of her long and continued services in the field of music. As an artist, composer and critic she has made a great contribution to Australia. Her assistance and encouragement to many young musicians has been outstanding."

In 1994, she attained VIP status at the Second Australian Composing Women's Festival and Conference and the Composer-of-Honour commendation from the School of Music-Conservatorium at Monash University with a concert of her music in her presence.

As part of her 100th birthday celebrations, ABC Classic FM sponsored a concert on 6 June 1999 focusing on four of her instrumental scores. It was presented by Mairi Nicolson. The performers were Robert Chamberlain (piano), Isin Cakmakcioglu (violin), Rachel Atkinson (cello) and Anne Gilby (oboe) A large audience filled the ABC's Iwaki Auditorium in Melbourne.

== Personal life ==
Linda Phillips married (Adolph) Maurice Kauffmann (17 March 1887 – 6 January 1945) on 4 July 1924. They had one daughter. Linda Phillips died in 2002, aged 103.
