= Canticle II: Abraham and Isaac =

1952 composition by Benjamin Britten

- Vocal composition by Benjamin Britten
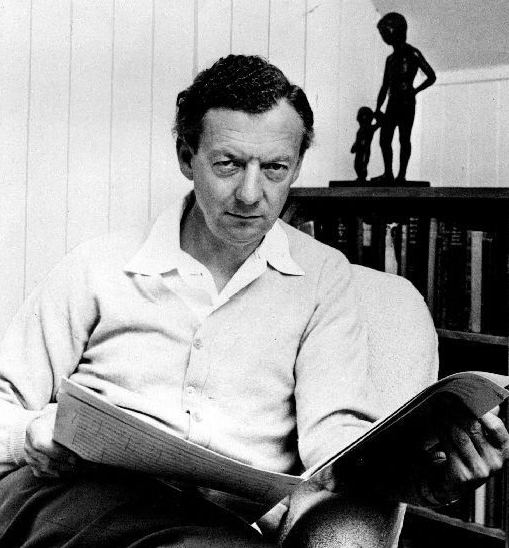
- Benjamin Britten in 1968
- Opus: 51
- Related: Canticles
- Text: Abraham and Isaac, from Chester Mystery Plays
- Language: English
- Dedication: Kathleen Ferrier and Peter Pears
- Performed: 20 January 1952
- Scoring: alto; tenor; piano

Canticle II: Abraham and Isaac, Op. 51, is a composition for tenor, alto and piano by Benjamin Britten, part of his series of five Canticles. Commissioned to be performed as a fundraiser for the English Opera Group, it sets the story of Abraham and Isaac from the Chester Mystery Plays. Britten assigned the tenor voice of Peter Pears to Abraham, the alto of Kathleen Ferrier to Isaac, and both singers singing in homophony to the voice of God. The work was premiered on 20 January 1952 by Pears and Ferrier, with Britten as the pianist. It was published by Boosey & Hawkes in 1952, dedicated to the singers.

== Background and history ==
Britten composed his five Canticles over an extended period of almost 30 years, between 1947 and 1975. They have in common to be written for voices, all including a tenor with Peter Pears in mind, and all setting religious but not biblical texts. The first such work was possibly titled Canticle because it set a paraphrase of verses from the Song of Songs, sometimes referred to as the Canticles. In the works, Britten followed the model of Purcell's Divine Hymns, and wrote works that can be seen as miniature cantatas, and as song cycles.

Canticle II: "Abraham and Isaac". Op. 51, was written in 1952 for Peter Pears, Kathleen Ferrier and Britten to be performed as a fundraiser for the English Opera Group. The text is based on the biblical story of Abraham and Isaac as depicted in the Chester Mystery Plays.

Britten set Canticle II: Abraham and Isaac in 1952 for an alto or countertenor, a tenor and piano. All canticles followed opera compositions, the second written after the world premiere of Billy Budd, which is focused on an innocent young man who is "effectively sacrificed". Canticle II was premiered on 20 January 1952 in Nottingham, England, by Ferrier, Pears and Britten as the pianist. It was published in 1952 by Boosey & Hawkes, dedicated to the two singers. Britten reused part of the music for his War Requiem.

== Text and music ==
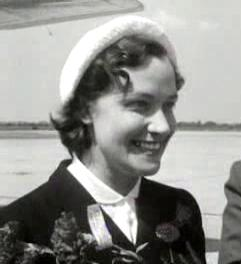
Kathleen Ferrier in 1951

Canticle II set text in English taken from an anonymous Chester Mystery Play. The work has been called a miniature opera, for the expressive music rendering the drama of the story. Britten used two vocalists for three parts: Abraham is sung by the tenor, Isaac by the high voice, and both together in homophony form the voice of God.

The Canticle is structured into short sections that let the drama unfold to the moment of the sacrifice when God intervenes. It closes with a hymn of thanksgiving. The duration is given as 17 minutes.

== Performances and recordings ==
Canticle II was performed at the Proms twice, in 2002 and in Britten's centenary year 2013. All five canticles were recorded by Naxos Records in 2005, Canticle II with tenor Philip Langridge, alto Jean Rigby and pianist Steuart Bedford. The five canticles were recorded again in 2012, with musicians around tenor Ben Johnson.
