= Frank Rigo =

American opera director/producer (1886–1936)

Frank Rigo (c. 1868 – 5 August 1936) was an American director of grand opera who had a substantial career in Australia, where he died penniless, leaving an orphaned daughter.

== History ==
Rigo was born in America and grew up in New York, where he developed a love of opera. He was associated with the production side of the business at the Met and in Covent Garden, London.

He left for Australia in 1911 to work as producer for the Melba-Williamson combination, and remained in the country after his period of contract was over. He made several attempts at founding a permanent opera company and mounted several important productions. His Rigo Grand Opera Company was in 1919 taken over by J. C. Williamson's.

Among the performers whose careers he promoted were Browning Mummery, Strella Wilson and Frederic Collier. (Note: Fred Collier, who had a stellar career as bass-baritone at Covent Garden, was no relation to Marie Collier.) Other stars of Rigo's operas include Constance Burt, who played Gretel in Hänsel und Gretel, Marguerite in Faust and Pamina in The Magic Flute; also Nellie Lafferty, who played Hansel to good reviews, but whose career was cut short by the 1914–18 war and a throat malady.

Despite several benefit concerts held to celebrate his contribution to opera in Australia, he died in poverty at his home in Dalgety Street, St Kilda. His only relative in Australia was a 14 year old daughter. A benefit was held to support her, and the Melbourne Argus, harking back to Rigo's generous nature, started a fund with the same object. In the first instance she was brought into the home of A. C. Bartleman, the well-known music teacher and associate of Browning Mummery. As an American by birth, she was free to be adopted by relatives in America, and J. C. Williamson offered his assistance if that action were taken. She did in fact return.
