= Harold Child =

English journalist and scholar (1869–1945)

Child in later years

Harold Hannyngton Child (20 June 1869 – 8 November 1945) was an English journalist, critic and scholar. After a short spell as an actor he turned to writing. He was instrumental in founding The Times Literary Supplement in 1902, and contributed a large number of theatre reviews and other articles to The Times.

He wrote the libretto for Ralph Vaughan Williams's opera Hugh the Drover, and was a major contributor to the Cambridge History of English Literature, covering a wide range of topics ranging from the Elizabethan theatre to Henry Fielding, William Cowper and Jane Austen.

== Life and career ==
=== Early years ===
Harold Child was born in Gloucester on 20 June 1869, the second son of Thomas Hannyngton Irving Child – a student at Gloucester Theological College, later, curate of St James's church Gloucester and from 1875 rector of Stratton, Gloucestershire – and his wife, Florence, daughter of Thomas Crossman, solicitor, of Thornbury, Gloucestershire. Child was educated at Winchester College from where he won a scholarship to Brasenose College, Oxford.

After graduating in 1892 with a second class degree in literae humaniores, Child joined a firm of solicitors in Thornbury, where he enjoyed rural pursuits: "there were horses to ride, and lawn tennis, and picnics, and skating at Tolworth, and the two hundred acres of rough shooting", but after transferring to the firm's London office he took to amateur theatricals. His close friend from Oxford, George Bancroft, son of Squire and Effie Bancroft, encouraged him, and he joined John Hare's company. He made his professional début at the Garrick Theatre, London, in December 1894 in a tiny role in a new play by Sydney Grundy, The Slaves of the Ring. As well as Hare the cast featured Arthur Bourchier, Brandon Thomas, Gerald du Maurier and Charles Rock, but it was a failure, closing after sixteen performances. Child was advised "to go into the provinces and get Experience". He did so, as well as playing in twenty-two West End productions during his brief stage career. He later published a light-hearted account of his experiences in Poor Player (1939). In 1896 he married Drusilla Mary Cutler, sister of the actress Kate Cutler. They had no children.

=== Writer ===
Child gave up the stage after two years and turned to writing as a career. Through the actor James Welch he met members of The Yellow Book set, among them Richard Le Gallienne, who introduced him to the editorial office of The Star. The paper published his short stories and, in serial form, longer ones such as his thriller, The Spider's Web (1897). Another paper, The Morning Leader, also published his fiction as well as his opinion pieces on such topics as theatrical libels. His first book was a novel, Phil of the Heath, which The Daily Telegraph described as "a sensational story of strong and well-sustained interest".

From 1902 to 1905 Child was secretary of the Royal Society of Painter-Etchers and Engravers. Concurrently, in association with his old friend Bruce Richmond, he played a key role in the inception and development of The Times Literary Supplement (TLS) from 1902. In 1905 he was appointed assistant editor of The Academy, a weekly review of literature, science and art. He left that post in 1907 to join the editorial staff of The Burlington Magazine, serving until 1910.

In 1910 the composer Ralph Vaughan Williams said to Richmond, "I want to set a prize fight to music. Can you find someone to make a libretto for me?" Richmond recommended Child, who quickly obliged but, according to the critic Michael Kennedy, he was not the right person for the task: "With a decade of folksong-collecting behind him, Vaughan Williams knew the real, unsentimental character of the English rural people. Child did not". The composer wrote to Child:

I should rather be more sympathetic with the English peasantry, the laugh all the way through is at the English people ... Now what I want in the opera is that the English peasant shall not be looked on as a mere clown but a person capable of such beautiful songs (and all that is implied by them).

The composer continued to adjust the libretto throughout his life.

=== TLS and The Times ===
Child became a mainstay of the TLS and gradually his contributions to the parent newspaper increased. For many years he was deputy to A. B. Walkley as The Times's theatre critic – Walkley told him that his experience as an actor enabled him to give the acting its due place in his dramatic criticism – and from 1912 to 1920 he was also theatre critic for The Observer. Most press articles in the early years of the century were unsigned, and consequently, according to Child's obituarist in The Times:

much of his very best writing was anonymous and lies enshrined in the files of The Times and The Times Literary Supplement, where the enthusiast may find it by the light of its own idiosyncrasy. It would not be difficult, for no one had developed to a surer pitch the art of writing in the first person without use of the personal pronoun.

The quality of Child's reviews in the TLS led to his being invited to contribute chapters to the Cambridge History of English Literature. His chapters covered a wide range of subjects from "Secular influences on the early English drama" and "The Elizabethan Theatre" to Henry Fielding, William Cowper, Tobias Smollett, George Crabbe and Jane Austen. Child contributed more chapters to the history than any other writer apart from George Saintsbury.

The list of books published by Child is not long: in addition to his early novel there are guidebooks to Shakespeare's country and the Channel Islands; there are translations of Aucassin and Nicolette, Henri Brémond's Sir Thomas More and Louis Dimier's French Painting in the XVI Century. He also published a small book of love poems, The Yellow Rock, as well as his theatrical memoir, A Poor Player.

=== Later years ===
Child's first wife had died in 1918 after years of ill health. In 1934 he married Helen Mary Wilkinson, daughter of Professor Spenser Wilkinson. In his later years Child's health deteriorated: asthma became an increasing problem. He died at his home in Littlehampton, Sussex, on 8 November 1945, aged 76. The Times obituarist said of him:

His learning, which he bore lightly when he came to show it, was often in demand for some special occasion; and whether he wrote, lectured, or delivered a broadcast talk his readers or hearers found in him not only sound doctrine and level-headed good sense but also an urbane and courteous style, in which there was no roughness or angularity.

== Sources ==
- Kennedy, Michael (1980) [1964]. The Works of Ralph Vaughan Williams (second ed.). Oxford: Oxford University Press. ISBN 978-0-19-315453-7.
- Roberts, S. C. (1948). "Memoir". Harold Child: Essays and Reflections. Cambridge: Cambridge University Press. OCLC 1149022593.
- Vaughan Williams, Ursula (1965) [1964]. RVW: A Biography of Ralph Vaughan Williams. Oxford: Oxford University Press. ISBN 978-0-19-315411-7.
- Wearing, J. P. (1976). The London Stage, 1890–1899: A Calendar of Plays and Players. Metuchen: Scarecrow Press. ISBN 978-0-81-080910-9.
