= Noel Mewton-Wood =

Australian pianist (1922–1953)

Noel Mewton-Wood (20 November 1922 – 5 December 1953) was an Australian-born concert pianist who achieved international fame on the basis of many distinguished concerto recordings during his short life.

== Life and career ==
Born in Melbourne, he studied with Waldemar Seidel at the Melbourne Conservatorium until the age of fourteen. After further study at London's Royal Academy of Music, he took private lessons from Artur Schnabel in Italy.

Noel Mewton-Wood plays at a concert held in the concert saloon of the Wharncliffe Hotel in Sheffield

In March 1940, he returned to London for his debut performance at Queen's Hall, performing Beethoven's third piano concerto with the London Philharmonic Orchestra under Sir Thomas Beecham. He then went on tour in the UK as assisting artist accompanying Viennese tenor Richard Tauber, and later performed in France, Germany, South Africa, Poland, Turkey and Australia.

Mewton-Wood also possessed considerable talent as a composer. His string trio was featured on the Second Boosey and Hawkes Concerts held at Wigmore Hall on 27 March 1943. He also composed music for films including Tawny Pipit (1944) and Chance of a Lifetime (1950).

During his time in London he lived in a house in Hammersmith Terrace and there would often host musical evenings and entertain his close friends Benjamin Britten and Peter Pears.

Mewton-Wood's The Times obituary described his debut performance:

At once his remarkable control and his musicianship were apparent: the ascending scales in octaves, with which the pianist first enters, thundered out with whirlwind power, but he could summon beautiful cantabile tone for the slow movement and the phrasing of the rondo theme was admirably neat for all the rapidity of the tempo; a true understanding of the relationship in concerto between soloist and orchestra, and of the soloist's part in ensemble, betokened the musician, the potential chamber performer."

In 1952–53, while Britten was busy composing his opera Gloriana, he deputised Mewton-Wood to accompany his partner, tenor Peter Pears.

When only 31, Mewton-Wood committed suicide by drinking prussic acid (hydrogen cyanide), apparently blaming himself for the death of his close friend William Fedrick, feeling he had overlooked the early symptoms of his ruptured appendix. Fedrick was suffering from severe pain for two or three days before calling a doctor. Mewton-Wood became distressed and was advised to check himself into the Atkinson Morley Hospital for psychiatric treatment where he stayed for five days. He was released but put under supervision. Mewton-Wood was found dead in his music room on 5 December 1953. The notes written by a friend of Mewton-Wood, John Amis, for the reissue of the Bliss Concerto recording, confirm that Mewton-Wood was homosexual and was distraught at his lover's tragic death.

Benjamin Britten wrote Canticle III: Still falls the rain for a concert in Mewton-Wood's memory.

Alan Bush’s Voices of the Prophets — Cantata for Tenor and Piano, Op. 41 (1953) was dedicated to Peter Pears and Mewton-Wood. Its first public performance was in London at the Recital Room, Royal Festival Hall, 22 May 1953. Bush also composed Autumn Poem (published in 1955) for Horn and Piano in his memory.

In 1962, his old teacher Waldemar Seidel auditioned the 7-year-old Geoffrey Tozer and declared "Noel has come back". Noel Mewton-Wood had died eleven months before Tozer was born.

== Repertoire ==
Mewton-Wood plays Busoni's Fantasia contrappuntistica (BBC 1953)

... Schumann's Kinderszenen (1950)

In addition to Beethoven, Mewton-Wood's repertoire included:

- Sir Arthur Bliss's Piano Concerto (Bliss was so impressed with Mewton-Wood's many performances and his recording of the work that he wrote his Piano Sonata for him)
- Busoni's Fantasia contrappuntistica and Piano Concerto (a 1948 recording with Sir Thomas Beecham is the earliest complete recording of the Busoni concerto known to survive)
- Chopin's Piano Concerto No. 1 in E minor
- Hindemith's Ludus Tonalis. Hindemith regarded him as the leading performer of Ludus tonalis.
- Igor Stravinsky's Concerto for Piano and Wind Instruments
- Tchaikovsky's three piano concertos, Concert Fantasia and G major sonata
- Tippett's song cycle The Heart's Assurance, with tenor Peter Pears
- Works by Bartók, Britten (Mewton-Wood gave the world premiere of the revised version of Britten's Piano Concerto), Liszt, Schubert, Mahler and Schumann.

He also composed chamber music, a piano concerto, ballet music, and music for the films Tawny Pipit (1944) and Chance of a Lifetime (1950).

== Books ==
Noel Mewton-Wood features in Sonia Orchard's 2009 novel, The Virtuoso, which is narrated by a fictional obsessive admirer and sometime lover of Noel. The novel is informed by the author's own background as a pianist, and her interviews with many of Noel Mewton-Wood's friends and contemporaries.
