= Robert Dell (socialist) =

British journalist and socialist activist

Robert Edward Dell (1865–1940) was a British journalist and socialist activist.

Dell matriculated at University College, Oxford in 1884. He joined the Fabian Society in 1889, and served on its executive from 1890. He lectured widely for the society, particularly in Lancashire, but left London in 1893 to become the editor of the Surrey Mirror.

Dell joined the Catholic church in 1897, and thereafter became a prominent modernist and anti-fascist writer within the church. He continued to work as an editor, moving to the Review of the Week in 1900, then The Connoisseur in 1902. However, in 1906 he moved to Paris, becoming an art dealer, and remaining there through World War I.

In 1918, Dell became the Paris correspondent for the Manchester Guardian, but he was expelled from the country, and moved to Geneva. He continued to work as a foreign correspondent for British newspapers, spending time in Berlin, back in Paris, and then again in Geneva. In 1939, he moved to New York, and died there the following year.
