= Buonaccorso da Montemagno =

Buonaccorso da Montemagno was the name shared by two Italian scholars from Pistoia in Tuscany. The elder Buonaccorso da Montemagno (died 1390) was a jurisconsult and ambassador who made a compilation of Pistoia's statutes in 1371. Poems are uncertainly attributed to him.

The younger, Giovane Buonaccorso da Montemagno (Pistoia 1391/93 — Florence 16 December 1429), nephew of the elder, was a Renaissance humanist. He was a judge in the Santa Croce quarter of Florence (1421) and in September of that year was appointed Maestro in the Studio fiorentino. In his poems (Rime), if they are not his uncles', he imitated Petrarch's sonnetti d'amore, setting an example for fifteenth-century Petrarchism. The younger Buonaccorso was highly esteemed for his public orations, in which Cristoforo Landino ranked him with Boccaccio, Leone Battista Alberti, and Matteo Palmieri. In July 1428 he was sent as ambassador to the Duke of Milan to establish the terms of the peace treaty in which Florence had acted as the ally of Venice.

Buonaccorso's De nobilitate, an outstanding expression of the literary topos of the New Man — Homo novus — whose nobility is inherent in his own character and career, was translated into English by John Tiptoft, created Earl of Worcester and published in 1481 by William Caxton, as Here foloweth the Argument of the declamacyon which laboureth to shewe. wherein honoure sholde reste. It was rendered in play form, still in Latin, by Sixt Birck and published at Augsburg in 1538.

The language of the Orazioni and the Rime were cited in Antonio Francesco Grazzini's Vocabulario, published by the Accademia della Crusca, as exemplars of the purest Italian verse and prose.

== Sources ==
- (Buonaccorso) Giambattista Carlo Giuliari, ed. Prose del Giovane Buonaccorso da Montemagno: inedite alcune da due codici della Biblioteca capitolare di Verona (Romagnoli) 1874. Sixteen Orations and biographic notice of the younger Buonaccorso, (pp xvi-xviii). Reprinted (Bologna : Commissione per i testi di lingua) 1968.
- Raffaele Spongano, editor. Le rime dei due Buonaccorso da Montemagno (Bologna: R, Patron) 1970. Poems of both Buonaccorso.
- Arie Johan Vanderjagt, Qui sa vertu anoblist : the concepts of noblesse and chose publicque in Burgundian political thought (Groningen: J. Miélot) [1981]. Fifteenth century translations of Buonaccorso's De nobilitate and others.
- David Herlihy, Medieval and Renaissance Pistoia: The Social History of an Italian Town, 1200-1430 (Yale University Press) 1967. Expanding horizons for natives of Pistoia.
