= Chester Mystery Plays =

Cycle of biblical plays historically performed in Chester, England

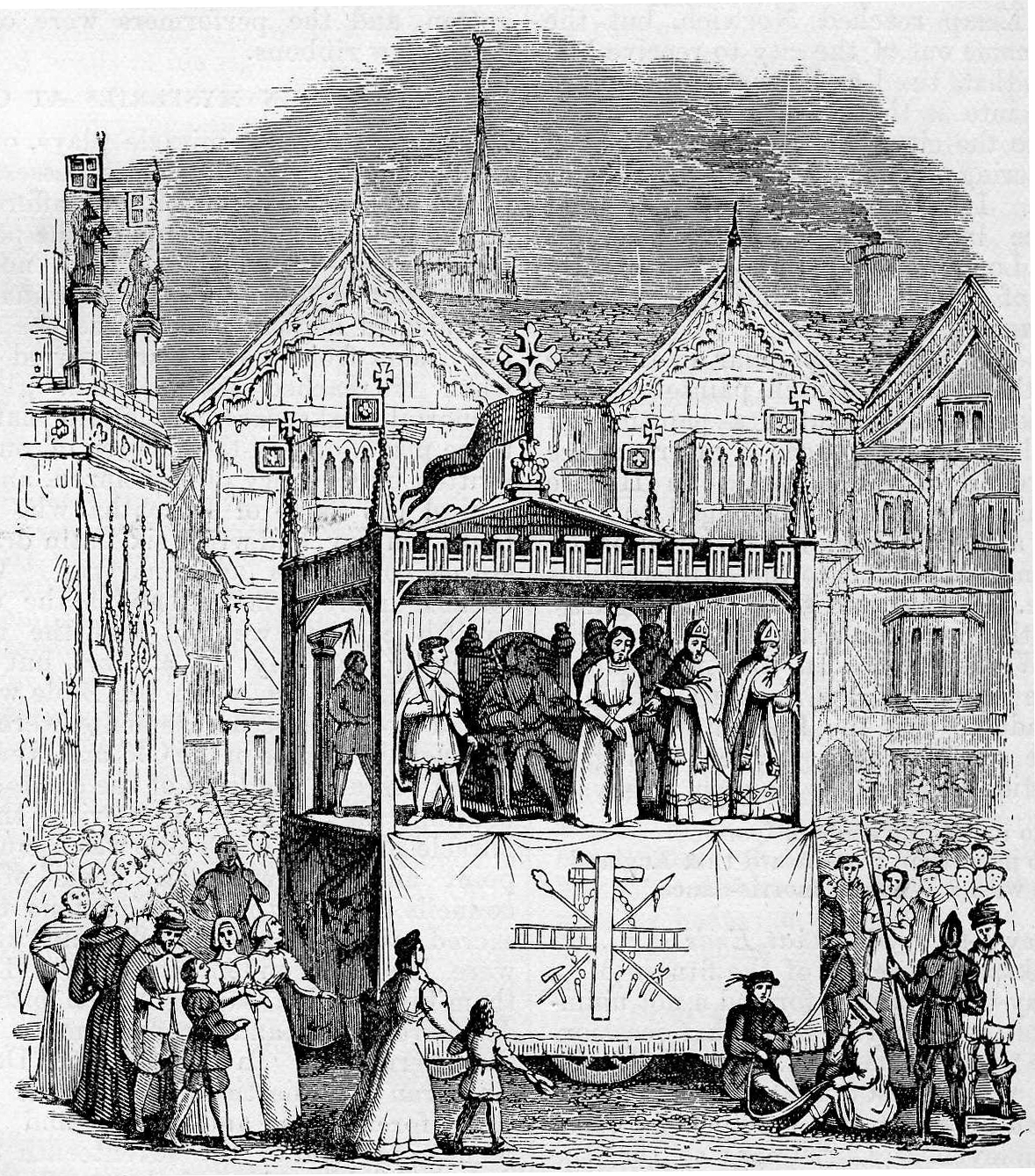
Engraving depicting an early Chester Mystery Play

The Chester Mystery Plays is a cycle of mystery plays originating in the city of Chester, England and dating back to at least the early part of the 15th century. They were banned during the reign of Elizabeth I for "Popery" by the Church of England.

== Origin and history ==
Biblical dramas were being performed in Latin across continental Europe as early as the 10th century dramatizing the events surrounding the birth of Christ.

By the late 12th century, biblical plays were performed outside of churches and were written in vernacular languages. They still emphasized incidents of the Old and New Testaments but were more dramatic and less strict about following biblical accounts. The 1150 AD performance titled The Play of Adam from Norman France dramatized the fall of Adam in the garden of Eden.

The inclusion of drama was extremely popular among the French population and found similar popularity in England. In the 14th century, vernacular Bible dramas were performed across England for three main reasons: the introduction of the Feast of Corpus Christi, the growing population of towns and municipal governments independent of feudal lords, and the development of trade guilds.

Pope Urban IV created the Feast of Corpus Christi in 1264 to celebrate the literal presence of Christ within the bread and wine of the Catholic Eucharist. The feast occurred on Trinity Sunday between May and June, and priests processed through the streets displaying the “Host” of Jesus which was a consecrated wafer encased within a casket.

The urbanization of townships resulted in populations becoming increasingly dependent on each other, enabling the specialization of labor. There were trade guilds for bakers, tailors, and goldsmiths who trained apprentices and regulated wages and working conditions. These skilled laborers working with their local communities helped build the stages and props for the performances. Subsequently, the staging of these dramatic performances became increasingly urban and informed from continental Europe by constant trade crossing the channel into England.

The “Host” would be accompanied by a tableau of biblical scenes which represented sacred Christian history which is the origin of the cycle plays. By 1394, biblical plays were being performed in York, England. The usage of pageant wagons enabled performances to travel across the country to various communities throughout England. The plays attracted people to the towns, and communities benefited from the commercial trade.

The Mystery plays were banned nationally in the 16th century. Chester was the last to concede in 1578 and so became the longest-running cycle in medieval times. It was revived in 1951 for the Festival of Britain, and they have since been staged every five years.

Prior to the performance, the Crier (officer) read out these banns: "The Aldermen and stewards of every society and company draw yourselves to your said several companies according to Ancient Custom and so to appear with your said several Companies every man as you are Called upon pain that shall fall thereon". Such early banns exhorted each company to perform well.

Under Queen Elizabeth I, the plays were seen as "Popery" and banned by the Church of England. Despite this, a play cycle was performed in 1568 and the cathedral paid for the stage and beer as in 1562. They were performed in 1572 despite a protest by a minister.

One edition of the plays begins with "The Banes which are reade beefore the beginninge of the playes of Chester, 4 June 1600". Each play ends with "Finis. Deo gracias! per me Georgi Bellin. 1592".

== Modern revivals ==
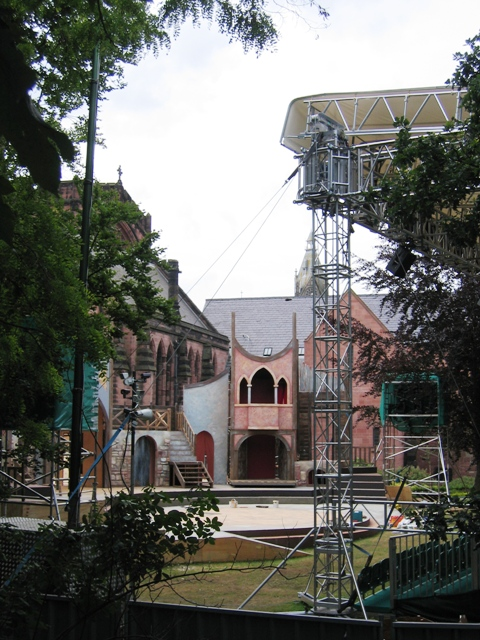
The stage for the 2008 Chester Mystery Plays: A view of Cathedral Green which has been taken over for the time being for the production of the 2008 Chester Mystery Plays. This view is from the city walls and the raked seating area is on the right.

The plays were revived in Chester in 1951 as part of the Festival of Britain and are presented there every five years.

The Players of St Peter have been performing the plays in London roughly every five years since 1946.

The American Theatre of Actors in New York City performed the penultimate play, The Coming of Antichrist, in August 2017.

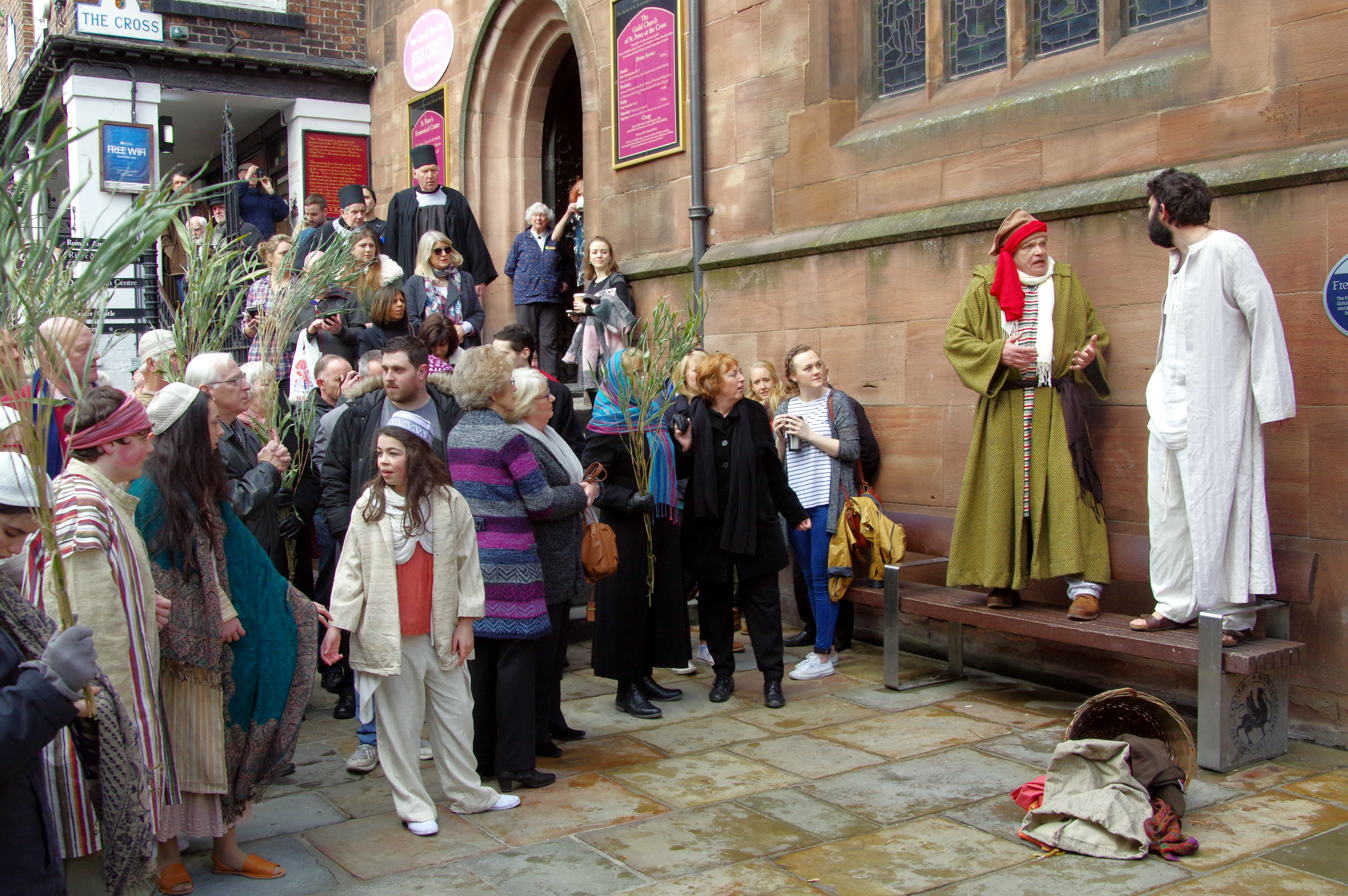
During the modern-day Chester Play Festival, people gather around the crowded streets to watch the performance. It is an interactive performance that integrates the actors and the audience into the uplifting street theatre. This festival celebrates the historical plays that formed England's theatre. To this day, people all around celebrate and enjoy the revivals and impressions of Chester Mystery Plays.

== Adaptations ==
In the twentieth century, the Noah's Flood play was set operatically by both Benjamin Britten (Noye's Fludde) and Igor Stravinsky (The Flood). The play regarded the relationship between wife and husband (urban life) and spoke about the physical and spiritual world that provides a backdrop of the play. Britten also set the Abraham and Isaac play as Canticle II: Abraham and Isaac.

The Mysteries is an adaption by poet Tony Harrison, principally based upon the Wakefield Cycle, but incorporating scenes from the York, Chester, and N-Town canons. It was first performed in 1977 at the National Theatre and revived in 2000 as a celebration of the millennium.

== See also ==
- Medieval theatre
