= Browning Mummery =

Australian opera tenor

Joseph Browning Mummery (12 July 1888 – 16 March 1974), was an Australian opera tenor of the 1920s and 1930s who achieved a considerable reputation in Europe and America. He appeared on stage with Dame Nellie Melba on various occasions at her request.

== Career ==
Mummery was born in Carlton, Melbourne, the only son of Joseph Ernest Mummery, jeweller, and his wife Matilda Louise Mummery, née Henry. He embarked on a career in engineering, but switched to his first love, singing, tutored by baritone A. C. Bartleman, a near-contemporary. (Note: A. C. Bartleman (c. 1888–1972) was born Alfred Charles Bottoms, son of mine manager William Bottoms (died 7 December 1899) of Eaglehawk, Victoria Bartleman was a protégé of Melba and studied in Germany and Italy.)

In 1919 he made his grand opera debut with Frank Rigo's opera company, under Gustave Slapoffski, as the title character in Faust. His old tutor A C. Bartleman was in the cast as Valentine. He was a member of J. C. Williamson's Grand Opera Company later that same year. He was later accepted into the Gonzales Opera Company.

Throughout his career he played lyrical leading roles in a host of operas, including Madama Butterfly, The Magic Flute, La bohème and Tosca, which was one of his favorites. He sang with Dame Nellie Melba in La bohème. The role he enjoyed most was David in Die Meistersinger von Nürnberg.

He worked with conductors Sir John Barbirolli, Sir Malcolm Sargent, Sir Thomas Beecham and Sir Henry Wood.

He sang extensively in America, appearing regularly on NBC radio and was assisted by the president of the company in getting his work permit extended. At one point he had a seven-year contract with His Master's Voice. Mummery appeared as the solo tenor in the 1934 film, Evensong with Evelyn Laye. On his return to Australia in 1937 he was contracted by the Australian Broadcasting Commission for a series of concerts. He later taught in Melbourne.

He retired to Canberra, where he died in 1974, aged 85.
