= Andrew Wailes =

Australian conductor and music director (born 1971)

- Born: Andrew Keith Wailes; September 7, 1971 (age 54); Melbourne, Victoria, Australia
- Education: Monash University
- Occupations: Conductor, Music director
- Years active: 1990s–present
- Known for: Artistic Director & Chief Conductor, Royal Melbourne Philharmonic; Principal Conductor, Melbourne University Choral Society; Artistic Director, The Australian Children's Choir (1999–2020)
- Awards: Australasian International Choral Conducting Competition (1999); Deakin Community Award (2019)
- Website: www.andrewwailes.com.au

Andrew Keith Wailes (born 7 September 1971) is an Australian conductor and music director. Winner of the Australasian International Choral Conducting Competition in Brisbane in 1999, he is the current artistic director and Chief Conductor of the Royal Melbourne Philharmonic Choir and Orchestra, Principal Conductor of the Melbourne University Choral Society, and music director and Conductor of the Box Hill Chorale. From 1999 to 2020 he served as artistic director of The Australian Children's Choir, and for a decade was Director of the Australian Catholic University Melbourne Campus Choir. He is a former president of the Australian Intervarsity Choral Societies Association, and is a former Artistic Administrator and artistic director of The Chamber Strings of Melbourne.

== Early life ==
Born in Melbourne, Wailes was educated at Caulfield Grammar School, where he was active as a student musician, performing in a wide range of ensembles as a flautist and also as a singer in various church and community choirs. He began his early music education as a treble in the Choir of St George's Anglican Church (Malvern), where he eventually rose to the position of Head Chorister, and appeared with various Royal School of Church Music-affiliated choirs.

== Middle years ==
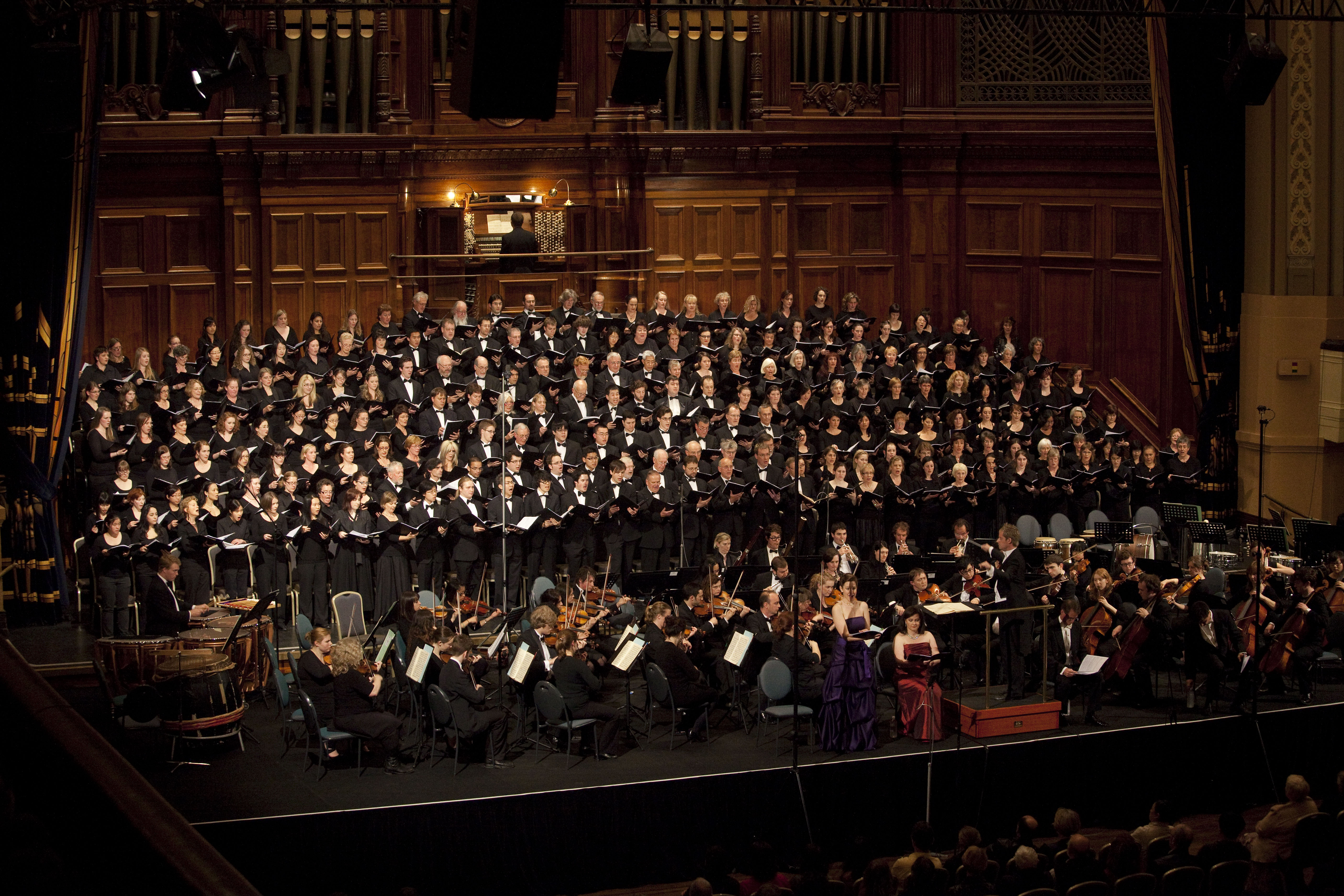
Andrew Wailes conducting RMP and MUCS at Melbourne Town Hall

Wailes continued practicing choral music in various choirs upon leaving school, and played in various amateur orchestras throughout his secondary and early university years. While studying Arts/Law at Monash University, Wailes became involved with the Monash University Choral Society (MonUCS), eventually accepting an invitation to become Assistant Conductor, and serving in a number of committee positions including several years as MonUCS President. He was subsequently awarded life membership of MonUCS for his involvement in the choir as singer, concert manager, assistant conductor, and on two separate occasions as conductor pro tem. During this time he was also invited to take up the post of conductor at the Melbourne University Choral Society (MUCS), and was actively involved in the Australian National Choral Association (ANCA) as a member of the editorial committee of the National Choral Journal "Sing Out", as well as the Australian Intervarsity Choral Societies Association (AICSA), serving as National President for a number of years, and convening the 49th Australian Intervarsity Choral Festival. Wailes also performed extensively as a soloist with various choirs and early music ensembles, including several seasons with the National Youth Choir of Australia, the Geelong Early Music Group, and The Australian Opera (Opera Australia). He made his debut with The Australian Opera as an apprentice in Wagner's Die Meistersinger von Nürnberg in 1995.

Wailes was appointed Principal Conductor of Melbourne University Choral Society (MUCS) in 1992, and since that time has become its longest serving conductor in over 70 years. He was awarded life membership of MUCS in 2005, being only the second person to receive such an honour in the choir's history. He has directed the choir in hundreds of performances, and in 2010 led it on its first international tour, conducting throughout Germany, Austria, Slovakia and the Czech Republic. He also directed performances at the Festival of Voices in Hobart, Tasmania.

Wailes took up his position as Assistant Conductor of the Royal Melbourne Philharmonic (RMP) in 1995, and became Director of Music and Chief Conductor at the end of 1998, making him one of the youngest persons to hold that position in over 150 years. Since that time he has led the RMP Choir and Orchestra in hundreds of performances, including two concert tours of The People's Republic of China with the RMP Orchestra. He was awarded Life Membership of the RMP, being only the third conductor to be granted that honour in over 150 years.

Artistic Director and Conductor of The Australian Children's Choir from 1999 until 2020.Wailes has led The ACC on numerous international tours, including several tours of New Zealand, China, England, Austria, Czech Republic, and was scheduled in 2011 to direct the choir in performances in Germany, Austria and at the International Festival of Children's Choirs at Canterbury Cathedral in England.

Wailes has also conducted the Box Hill Chorale (formerly the Box Hill Choral Society) since 1995, and has directed Faculty Choirs at the University of Melbourne, Melba Memorial Conservatorium of Music, and the School of Music Conservatorium at Monash University. For four years he directed the Monash Faculty Choir Viva Voce. Since 2000, Wailes has also directed the Campus Choir at the St Patrick's (Melbourne) Campus of the Australian Catholic University, where he has also lectured in conducting.

== Awards and honours ==
Wailes was the inaugural winner of the Australasian International Choral Conducting Competition, in Brisbane, held during the National Choralfest, presented by the Australian National Choral Association. He is a life member of the Royal Melbourne Philharmonic Choir and Orchestra, the Melbourne University Choral Society, The Australian Children's Choir, Box Hill Chorale, and the Monash University Choral Society. He is listed in the inaugural edition of Who's Who in Victoria, and the International Edition of Strathmore's Who's Who. In 2019 he was the recipient of a Deakin Community Award, presented by Michael Sukkar MP and Susan Alberti AC.

== Other arts organisations ==
Andrew Wailes is a former Principal Guest Conductor of the Australian Classical Players Orchestra, and has appeared as guest conductor of other ensembles including the State Orchestra of Victoria, Stuttgart Radio Symphony Orchestra, Orchestra of Stuttgart University, and Camerata Academica Freiburg (Germany), the Victorian College of the Arts Symphony Orchestra, Yale Glee Club, Harvard University Collegium Musicum (USA), Melbourne Sinfonia, the Christchurch Sinfonia (New Zealand), Melbourne Youth Orchestra, Stonnington Symphony Orchestra, Geelong Philharmonic Orchestra, and has directed student ensembles at both Melbourne University and Victorian College of the Arts. Andrew is also a regular guest conductor of various orchestras and choirs at summer schools around the country. He has conducted orchestras at the Melbourne Summer Music Camp, Geelong and State Music Camps, and for three years directed the orchestra program at Blackburn High School.

Wailes has assisted Russian maestro Valery Gergiev as backstage conductor and extra chorus director for the Kirov Opera's performances for the Melbourne International Festival of the Arts, and has prepared and directed choirs for the Perth International Arts Festival's performance of Schoenberg's Gurre-Lieder with the Australian Youth Orchestra. He co-conducted the world premiere season of Julian Yu's contemporary opera The Possessed, for Chamber Made Opera and in 2005 he conducted Britten's The Rape of Lucretia for Lyric Opera of Melbourne (receiving a Green Room Award nomination for best opera conductor.)
