= Harold Elvins =

Australian pianist

Harold Stanley James Elvins (March 1878 – 28 January 1943) was an Australian pianist, the third and last proprietor of the school of music founded in Melbourne by George Marshall-Hall as a rival to the Melbourne Conservatorium of Music established by the University of Melbourne.

== History ==
Elvins was born at Campbells Creek, near Castlemaine, Victoria, second son of James and Betty Elvins, later of Parkville, Victoria, and educated at Wesley College.

He was among the first pupils to enrol at the conservatorium established by George Marshall-Hall, and achieved a reputation as a fine pianist and accompanist to Nellie Melba and Louise Kirkby Lunn. He became a piano teacher at the same school, and when Fritz Hart left to live in Honolulu, Elvins succeeded him as director, later purchasing the business.

He converted the conservatorium to a limited liability company, renamed the Melba Conservatorium in recognition of Dame Nellie's long association with the school, and her considerable endowments to it.

== Recognition ==
Elvins was at various times:

- President of the Association of Music Teachers of Victoria from its foundation in 1929
- President of the Music Council of Australia
- Examiner for the Australian Music Examinations Board
