= Jean Gérardy =

Belgian cellist

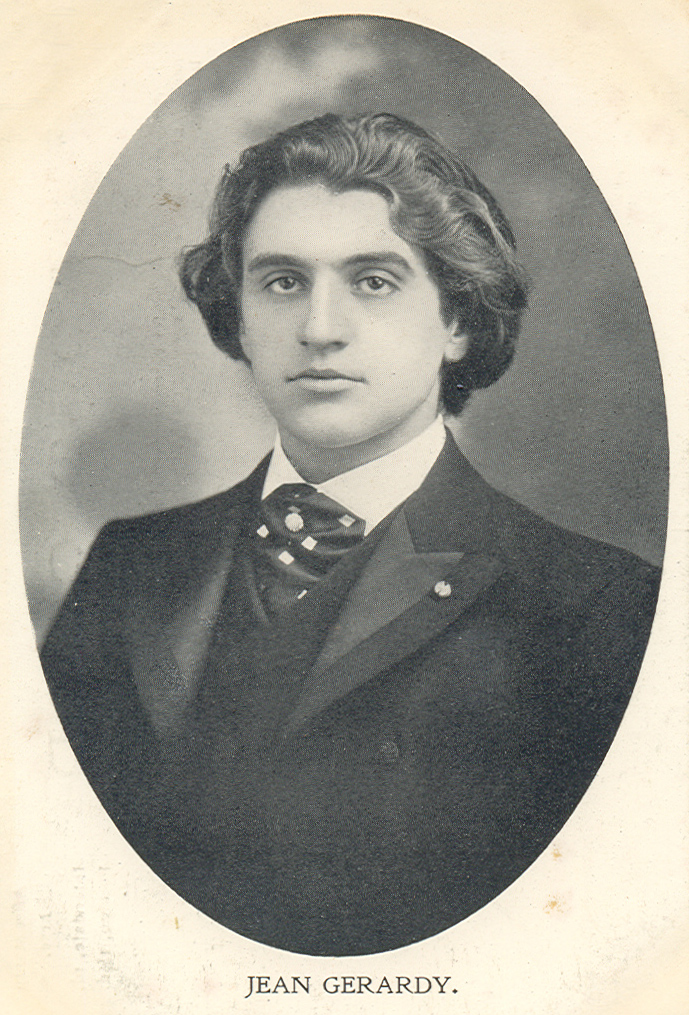
Gerardy in 1901

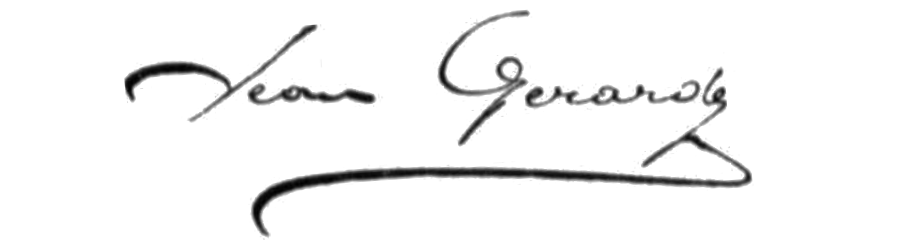

Jean Gérardy (7 December 1877 – 4 July 1929), often rendered Gerardy, was a Belgian cellist, dubbed "the Wizard of the 'cello" and "the Sarasate of the 'cello".

== History ==
Gerardy was born in Spa, Liège, Belgium, a son of Dieudonné Gérardy, a professor at the conservatoire of Aix-la-chapelle, and later that at Lille, known as a composer and cornettist. He had some early instruction from his father, and was considered an accomplished player at age seven. He took the full violoncello course under Alfred Massau at Verviers Conservatoire, from 1 October 1885 to 15 August 1889, during which he won numerous prizes and awards. He had further instruction from Richard Bellman of the Heckmann Quartet and one Grützmacher, most likely Friedrich, in Dresden. At age 11, while still a student, he played at Nottingham in a trio with Paderewski and Eugène Ysaÿe and in London he was hailed as the new Piatti.

He appeared on stage in Europe and America with such luminaries as Adelina Patti, Paderewski, Von Bulow?, Richter?, and Eugène Ysaÿe.

He first visited Australia in 1901 with his manager, violinist Albert H. Canby, having recently split with C. L. Young. He arrived in Sydney aboard the RMS Ventura from San Francisco on 11 May 1901; and took the train to Melbourne a week or so later. The stated purpose of his visit was a holiday, but included some concerts with Australian singer Olive Kingston and German pianist Eduard Scharf, who had recently settled in the country. Their tour dates were:

- Melbourne, at the Town Hall: 30 May 1901, 1 June, 4 June 6 June, 8 June 10 June 12 June and 15 June. They made one country concert, at the Royal Princess Theatre, Bendigo, on 11 June.
- Adelaide: at the Town Hall 22 June, 25 June, 27 June, and 29 June; all evening concerts. He arrived in Sydney from Melbourne on 6 July 1901.
- Sydney: at the Town Hall 9 July, 11 July, 13 July, 16 July, 17 July (matinee), and 18 July. Attendance at the Sydney concerts was disappointing, many seats being empty.

On 20 July Gerardy left Sydney with Canby, his manager, by the SS Westralia for New Zealand, where he played at Christchurch and Auckland, returning to the US by the RMS Ventura on 17 August. He returned to Australia in 1902 for J. H. Tait, in company with Gottfried Galston (pianist) and Electa Gifford (singer), again under the management of A. H. Canby. They played six concerts each in Melbourne (10–19 July) and Sydney (24 July – 2 August), with one night in Bendigo (18 July) then three in Brisbane (7–9 August); a promised tour of Tasmania was cancelled. Many concerts were under-subscribed and Gerardy did not return to Australia until 1923.

He was a member of Artur Schnabel's second Schnabel Trio with the violinist Carl Flesch, but in 1914, with the outbreak of the First World War, he left the trio and was replaced by Hugo Becker.

He joined the Belgian Army as a private, but was soon taken out of the ranks and made several important concerts for the troops and fund raisers for the Red Cross.

In April 1923 Gerardy, accompanied by his Australian-born wife, was brought back to Australia by E. J. Gravestock for an extended tour, beginning at Sydney on 14 April. Supporting him was American pianist George Stewart McManus and Australian contralto Essie Ackland. Unlike his earlier concerts in Sydney, the demand was so great that additional dates were added to the schedule. The Anzac Day concert was made more memorable by the guest appearance of Sir Harry Lauder. The Central Hall, Newcastle followed on 5 May, then Melbourne 8–24 May, Adelaide 31 May – 6 June, Perth 11–19 June, Kalgoorlie 21 June, Adelaide again 25, 26 June. They left for New Zealand on 29 July, a highly successful tour with barely an empty seat in over 20 concerts. He returned to touring Australia in Brisbane 5–10 September and back to Sydney 12–15 September and Melbourne 18–26 September, with Geelong on 19 September. The farewell concert on 29 September was backed by the Melbourne Symphony Orchestra, under Alberto Zelman. He left for Europe by the RMS Osterley on 1 October.

Gérardy died at Spa, Belgium.

== Instruments ==
Gerardy owned a 1710 Stradivarius cello, which had not been played in 80 years when he purchased it from Lord Norton; in 1923 it was valued at £10,000. He had a replica made by Hart and Son of London, for use while at sea.

He also owned a 1754 Guadagnini, currently owned by Carter Brey.

== Family ==
Gerardy married Amelia McQuade at St James's, Manchester Square, London on 8 October 1907. Amelia was a daughter of Cecily McQuade, née King, and Harry McQuade of Potts Point, hence a granddaughter of William McQuade, one-time owner of Her Majesty's Theatre, Sydney.

A sister, Theresa Gerardy, was a fine pianist.
