= Melbourne Conservatorium of Music =

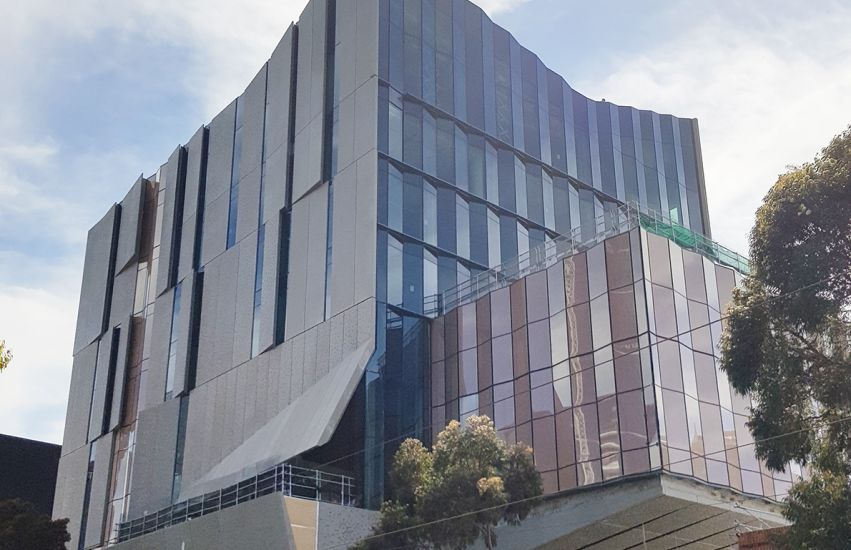
Image of Melbourne Conservatorium

The Melbourne Conservatorium of Music is the music school at the University of Melbourne and part of the Faculty of Fine Arts and Music. It is located near the Melbourne City Centre on the Southbank campus of the University of Melbourne.

Degree programs specialising in music performance, composition, musicology, ethnomusicology, interactive composition, jazz and improvisation, conducting, pedagogy and music therapy are taught at the Conservatorium, which also runs an Early Music Studio, and oversees the publishing house Lyrebird Press. It offers graduate programs including certificates and diplomas, and research and coursework awards at the masters and doctoral levels.

== History ==
The teaching of music at the University of Melbourne has been undertaken under a number of administrative structures. The first award of a degree in music (a Bachelor of Music) was recorded in 1879, and the first Chair of Music, endowed by Francis Ormond – known as the Ormond Professor of Music - was occupied from 1891, even though there was not yet a department or faculty of music at the university.

Through the efforts of the first Ormond Professor, G. W. L. Marshall-Hall, this was rectified in 1894 with the founding of the "University Conservatorium", whose leased premises were located in the Queen's Coffee Palace, a six-storey building on the corner of Rathdowne and Victoria streets, Carlton. By the end of the year 1900, the teaching staff had grown to 24, and the students' concerts at the Town Hall and Her Majesty's Theatre were a vital part of the social and artistic life of Melbourne.

Following a vigorous campaign by his detractors, Marshall-Hall lost his tenure, to be replaced by Franklin Peterson, but was able to continue running the music school as a private concern in the old Victorian Artists' Society Gallery, opposite St Patrick's Cathedral, Albert Street, East Melbourne, renaming it the "Marshall-Hall Conservatorium", later "Albert Street Conservatorium", "Hart's Conservatorium", and finally "Melba Conservatorium".

With the departure of much of the teaching staff and students to Albert Street, the University was obliged to create its own Conservatorium on University Grounds. The foundation stone for a permanent Conservatorium in Royal Parade, on the University campus, was laid by (later Dame) Nellie Melba on 26 November 1909, and the building, designed by Bates, Peebles & Smart, was opened in 1913. Assisted by a donation of £1,000 from a benefit concert arranged by Melba, which was matched by the Victorian State Government, the concert room now known as Melba Hall was added and opened by the Governor-General, Lord Denman, on 29 October 1913.

After the death of Peterson, and Marshall-Hall's reinstatement, the two conservatories were expected to merge, but the staff and students of the breakaway institution decided otherwise, perhaps fearing discrimination by the University Council against its various German-born teachers. Fritz Hart, its director since the departure of Eduard Scharf, chose to remain at its head, to be succeeded by Harold Elvins.

The Conservatorium became the Faculty of Music within the University of Melbourne in 1926, and its first Dean was appointed. This was to be the administrative structure for the next 65 years.

=== Contemporary times ===
The Faculty of the VCA and Music was created in 2009 from the amalgamation of the University's Faculty of Music and Faculty of the Victorian College of the Arts. On 1 January 2012 the two operating divisions became known as the Faculty of the Victorian College of the Arts and Melbourne Conservatorium of Music (Faculty of VCA and MCM).

On 1 January 2018, the Faculty's name was changed again to the Faculty of Fine Arts and Music. The Victorian College of the Arts and Melbourne Conservatorium remain as schools within the Faculty. In March 2019 the majority of Conservatorium operations moved to the new Ian Potter Southbank Centre, a state of the art facility for music. This makes the Southbank Campus of the University of Melbourne the largest creative tertiary education provider situated inside an arts precinct in the country, and one of the few so located in the world.

== Notable people ==
=== Ormond Professor of Music ===
- G. W. L. Marshall-Hall, 1891–1900
- Franklin Peterson, 1901–1914
- G. W. L. Marshall-Hall, 1915
- W. A. Laver, 1915–1925
- Sir Bernard Heinze, 1926–1957
- George Loughlin, 1958–1979
- Michael Brimer, 1980–1989
- Warren Bebbington, 1991–2008
- Gary E. McPherson, 2009–present

=== Directors of the University Conservatorium ===
- G. W. L. Marshall-Hall, 1895–1900
- Franklin Peterson, 1901–1914
- William Laver, 1915–1925
- Sir Bernard Heinze, 1926–1957
- J. Sutton Crow, 1943–1945
- George Loughlin, 1958–1974

=== Deans of the Faculty of Music ===
- Bernard Heinze, 1926–1942
- J. Sutton Crow, 1943 (Acting)
- Sir Bernard Heinze, 1944–1952
- Charles Moorhouse, 1953 (Acting)
- Sir Bernard Heinze, 1954–1957
- Donald Cochrane, 1957 (Acting)
- George Loughlin, 1958–1965
- Richard Samuel, 1966
- George Loughlin, 1967–1970
- Raymond Martin, 1971
- George Loughlin, 1972–1974
- Maxwell Cooke, 1975–1980
- Michael Brimer, 1981–1985
- Ronald Farren-Price, 1986–1990

=== Head of the School of Music within the Faculty of Music, Visual and Performing Arts ===
- John Griffiths, 1991
- Warren Bebbington, 1992–1994

=== Deans of the Faculty of Music (re-instituted) ===
- Warren Bebbington, 1994–2006
- Cathy Falk, 2007 (Acting)
- Cathy Falk, 2008

=== Directors of the Melbourne Conservatorium of Music ===
- Gary E. McPherson. 2011–2019 (Head, School of Music within the Faculty of the VCA and MCM, 2009–2010)
- Richard Kurth. 2019-

=== Graduates ===
- Helen Adams, soprano
- Arthur Chanter (-1950), composer
- Bryony Marks, composer
- Antoinette Halloran, operatic soprano
- Anna O'Byrne, operatic soprano
- Siobhan Stagg, operatic soprano
- Stacey Alleaume, operatic soprano
