= Melba Opera Trust =

Former music school in Melbourne, Australia

Coordinates: 37.8129°S 144.9931°E

The Melba Memorial Conservatorium of Music was a school of music located in Melbourne, Victoria, Australia. During its early days it was closely associated with opera diva Dame Nellie Melba, after whom it was later named. In 1994 it became affiliated with Victoria University. Founded in 1901 as the Conservatorium of Music, Melbourne (informally "Marshall Hall Conservatorium" or "Albert Street Conservatorium"), the Melba Conservatorium ceased teaching at the end of 2008. However, the Melba Opera Trust continues to fund scholarships to help young opera singers develop their skills.

== Early history ==
The "Melba" was established as a private conservatorium in 1901 after breaking away from the University of Melbourne, whose Melbourne Conservatorium of Music was founded in 1895. George Marshall-Hall, its founder, named it The Conservatorium of Music, Melbourne, housed in the Victorian Artists' Society building in Albert Street, East Melbourne. The Conservatorium continued as a private business with a sole proprietor through its second director, Fritz Hart and on to its third director, Harold Elvins.

When Elvins purchased the business he set about forming the Conservatorium into a nonprofit company. This was achieved in 1944 and the "Melba" has continued to run since that time as an incorporated company with a governing Council. Several further directors and a change of premises for ten years to 16 Hoddle Street, Abbotsford, saw the Conservatorium, by 1983, purchase accommodation at 45 York Street, Richmond, where it remained until its closure in 2008.

== Change of name ==
Australia's famous diva, Dame Nellie Melba, was closely associated with the Conservatorium, teaching there from 1915 until her death in 1931. Her link with the Conservatorium continued after her death, through the provision of a generous bequest, hence its change of name, in 1956, to the Melba Memorial Conservatorium of Music.

== Association with Victoria University ==
Melba achieved recognition of its Diploma of Music through its affiliation in 1994 with Victoria University. Under this agreement, Melba delivered the University's Bachelor of Music courses. Melba also offered private studio tuition through its Single Studies program, and short courses.

In 2002, Melba commenced delivery of two new degree programs at the University's Sunbury campus, in a cross-sectoral Music Department, sharing facilities with Victoria University TAFE's School of Further Education, Arts and Employment Services. These BMus programs at Sunbury provide undergraduate courses in music technology and contemporary music performance.

Melba continued to produce classical and contemporary music performers and other music professionals well equipped to pursue a variety of careers at local community, national and international level. Students spent more than half of their course time in performance and/or studio related activities under the guidance of a small specialist staff.

== Closure and legacy ==
After a little more than a century, the Melba Conservatorium ceased teaching at the end of 2008. However, it finds its continuing expression in the form of Melba Opera Trust.

On the closure of the Conservatorium, its assets were liquidated as a contribution to the capital base of the newly established Melba Opera Trust.

=== Ongoing scholarships ===
The Alfred Ruskin Memorial Award was established in 2004 and continues in perpetuity.

Other scholarships include the Dame Nellie Melba Scholarship, Melba Opera Trust Scholarships, and others.

== Patron ==
The Patron of the Conservatorium was Dame Nellie Melba's granddaughter, Pamela, Lady Vestey.

== Notable alumni ==
- Gertrude Johnson – soprano and founder of the National Theatre.
- Deirdre Cash – torch singer and novelist
- Louise Hanson-Dyer (née Smith) – pianist and founder of music publishing company Éditions de l'Oiseau-Lyre.
- Peggy Glanville-Hicks – composer
- George Dreyfus – composer
- Raja Ram (musician) - composer, founder TIP Records
- Christian O'Brien – composer and guitarist of indie pop band Alpine (band).
