= Victor Zelman =

Australian painter and etcher

Victor Zelman (1877–1960) was an Australian painter and etcher. He was born in Melbourne and was the son of Alberto Zelman (senior) and the brother of Alberto Zelman, the founder of the Melbourne Symphony Orchestra.

== Life and career ==
Zellman was born into a musical family, both his father and his elder brother were noted musicians. He grew up in Carlton and attended King's College in Fitzroy. Victor mastered the viola and violin and performed in chamber orchestras as a young man. He trained at the National Gallery of Victoria Art School in Melbourne. After finishing his training, Zelman exhibited with other groups of traditional artists in the general exhibitions organised by the various artists' societies in Melbourne including The Victorian Artists’ Society, The Melbourne Artists’ Society, The Fine Art Society, The Painters and Etchers’ Society, and The New Gallery and submitted work in various municipal art competitions and exhibitions.

In 1907 Zellman married Clara Borsa. He was 46 when he held his first solo exhibition of paintings in Melbourne. In August 1923 at a small gallery run by Margaret McLean in the Tunnocks building at 125 Collins Street. It was reviewed in both the Age and Argus newspapers. The unnamed Age reviewer described it as a "loveable little show amidst picturesque surroundings" and implied that Victor was known already and setting out in a new direction with his landscape paintings. Victor was firmly in the camp of the Traditionalists who dominated the Melbourne art scene until the end of the 1930s. This style continued to be taught at the National Gallery Art School in Melbourne firmly entrenched there by the views of the Gallery director James S. McDonald.

Plein aire and impressionist landscapes were the popular choice of the Melbourne art public at this time. It was at the very end of the era started by the Melbourne Heidleberg School in the 1880s and soon to be riven by huge challenges to its dominance by young artists such as George Bell in Melbourne and the founding of the Melbourne Contemporary Group in 1932. European Modernism was almost unknown in Melbourne at this time and throughout his career, Victor showed little interest in its many iterations.

The Age review encouraged him and the public by adding "Mr Zelman has paid us a charming complement -he exhibits only his best work … all carefully studied and entirely satisfactory panels." His reviewer hoped that "If promises are fulfilled he will carve himself a niche among Australian landscape painters." The review concluded, "We will watch with deep interest Mr. Zelman’s future work."

Zelman continued to get encouraging reviews from the Argus and Age newspapers throughout the 1920s. The society gossip magazine Tabletop also reviewed his work favorably. His natural clientele was the comfortable middle class of Melbourne including so-called titled individuals who sometimes opened his exhibitions with condescending approval, but provided that cache of exclusiveness that was important in attracting sales. At one such opening, Lady Creswell claimed his name was "a household word in Victoria" and had painted in the hills on their property where she sent out a "jug of tea and cakes" to him to refresh him in his labors.

Throughout the 1920s and 1930s, Zelman travelled extensively throughout Victoria painting small plein aire scenes approximately 30 x 20 cm and studies for larger works up to 70 x 90 cm. He would stay for some time in an area working at a number of canvasses before returning to his studio. Amongst the places named in his paintings are Romsey, Carlsruhe, Croydon, Castlemaine, Glen Waverley, Dromana, Rosebud, Shoreham, Mooroolbark, Diamond Creek, Ashburton, Lilydale, Port of Melbourne and the Goulburn and Murray rivers. When at home he painted and etched many scenes from his local area, Hepburn Springs and Daylesford.

== Gallery holdings ==
- National Gallery of Australia
  - Hepburn Springs (etching)
  - The Artists Home (etching).
- National Gallery of Victoria
  - Promise of Spring (oil on canvas)
  - Reflections, Thornton (aquatint and etching)
  - Sailor's Mission Church (aquatint)
- Art Gallery of New South Wales
  - Hepburn Bridge (etching)
- Castlemaine Art Museum
  - Donovan’s Bridge (oil on board)
  - Croydon Gum (oil on canvas)
  - Old Farm near Castlemaine (etching)
  - Untitled gum tree (etching)
- National Library of Australia
  - Murray River Steamer (engraving)
- Benalla Art Gallery
  - Gums at Shepherds Flat (oil on board)

== Exhibitions ==
August 1923, Tunnock Buildings, 125 Collins St, Melbourne (solo show, landscape paintings)

- Tranquil Pastures
- The Last Load
- Rising Mists
- Gums at Silvan
- The Bush Road
- Willows
- Breakneck Hepburn

April, 1925, Fine Art Society, 100 Exhibition St, Melbourne (solo show, oil paintings)

- Glen Waverley
- Turning the Plough
- Fleeting Sunshine
- An Old Gum Dromana
- Gums Croydon
- The Old Road
- The Drinking Pool
- Doctor's Gully Hepburn
- Jim Crow Creek
- Wattle Hepburn
- Green Pastures
- Mooroolbark
- Near Croydon
- Early Morning
- Jubilee Lake Daylesford
- Sunset Glow
- Haystooks
- A Little Grey Hut in the Bush
- Diamond Creek
- Ashburton
- Haycarting
- Stewart's Farm
- The Woodmen
- Ballharrie's Corner
- The Bush Path
- Leggo's Farm
- Rowe's Harvest
- The Old Homestead
- The Piggery Tunstall
- Mountain View Croydon
- The Silo Croydon
- Lilydale
- Rosebud
- Cutting the Crop
- Reaping and Binding
- The Edge of the Lake
- Evening
- The Pink Tree Croydon

November 1928, The New Gallery, Melbourne (solo show, landscape paintings)

- Plums
- Trawool
- Sun Wind and Rain
- Garden Hill
- Sand Carters
- Carrum
- Whittlesea
- Reflections of the Goulburn
- Wintry Day
- Monegatta
- Shoreham
- Mt William Romsey
- Lobb's Farm Romsey
- Jim Crow Creek
- Shoreham
- Deep Creek Romsey
- Between the Showers Carlsruhe

December 1931, 7th Annual Christmas Exhibition of Etchings and Woodcuts by leading English and Australian Artists, Sedon Galleries, Melbourne

- Reflections, Thornton
- Shepherds Flat
- The Wood Carter
- The Burnley Ferry
- Pastoral
- Sailors Mission Church

December 1932, 8th Christmas Exhibition of Etchings and Woodcuts by Master Etchers, Sedon Galleries, Melbourne

(Same works as in the 7th Annual Christmas Exhibition)

== Works sold since 1970 ==
According to the Australian Art Sales Digest, 134 of Zelman's works have been sold between 1969 and 2016. As of 2016 the highest recorded price for a painting was A$14,500, while works on paper including prints and graphics have fetched up to $220. The following works have been sold at auction since 1970.

=== Oil on board ===
Many of the paintings have similar names. Different sizes of the boards indicated that all listed here are separate paintings.

- The Last Load
- Hepburn Springs, Daylesford
- Country Valley
- The Team
- Near Macedon
- Afternoon Pastoral
- Summer Light
- Romsey Landscape
- Wattle and Gum
- Bush Road
- The Lonely Bull
- Bush Road near Hepburn Springs
- Orchard Country
- Dawn Reflections
- Gum Trees at Hepburn Springs
- The Lagoon, Diamond Creek
- Sheep in paddock
- Poplars at Shepherd's Flat
- A Bush Track Romsey
- Gums at Daylesford
- The Haycart
- Morning Hepburn
- Spring Day, Burwood
- Spring Landscape
- Figures and Ox Cart in Coastal Landscape
- Cattle grazing in Treed Landscape
- Evening Light, Hepburn Springs
- Pavilion, Hepburn Springs
- Mt Franklin Near Hepburn Springs
- Settler’s Cottage
- Haycarting
- Cottages Near Daylesford
- Port Scene
- Plums
- Cows Grazing
- Cattle in Landscape
- Pastoral Landscape
- Boating Near Hepburn Springs
- Bush Road, Hepburn Springs
- Gums at Croydon
- Reflections, Thornton
- A Summers Day
- The Jinker
- Horse and Cart
- Boating Near Hepburn Springs
- Spring is Whispering
- Harvest Hillsides
- Swans on the River
- Summer Landscape
- Lilydale
- Sailors Creek
- Grazing Cattle
- Lorne, Mt. Pleasant (pair of paintings)
- Impressionist Victorian Landscape
- Tranquil Morning
- Panoramic Landscape
- Nocturne
- Riverside Pastoral
- Pastoral Landscape
- Australian Landscape
- Twilight
- In the Dandenongs
- Dandenong Vista
- Harvest Time
- The Prospector's Tent
- Evening Hillside
- Lithgow Near Katoomba
- Sheep on Hillside, Leggott's Farm
- Australian Pastorale
- Bush
- The Haymakers
- Old Mill, Hepburn Springs
- Early Evening
- The Fruit Pickers
- Sheep Amongst the Gums
- Near Daylesford
- Derriben Creek [sic]
- The Old Ballan Road at Daylesford
- The Little River
- The Old Waterwheel
- View of Canterbury
- Shepherds Flat
- Summer Pastures
- Forest Pool
- Lorne
- Morning, Hepburn
- Thunder Sky Near Hepburn Springs
- River trees
- Pastoral
- Gums and Sheep
- Bush Country
- Pastoral
- Misty Morning, Silvan
- Camouflaged Ships
- The Quiet Pool

=== Watercolors ===
- Landscape
- Homestead
- Thornton

=== Prints or etchings ===
- Gums
- Trees
- Farm Near Castlemaine
