= Melbourne University Choral Society =

Choir in Melbourne, Australia

- Choir
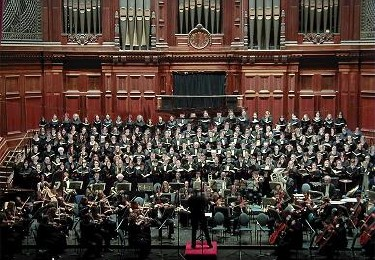
- MUCS performing Carmina Burana at Melbourne Town Hall
- Also known as: MUCS
- Origin: Melbourne, Victoria, Australia
- Founded: 1939 (87 years ago)
- Genre: Classical
- Chief conductor: Andrew Wailes
- Website: www.mucs.org.au

Melbourne University Choral Society (MUCS) are an Australian 120-voice choir in Melbourne, Victoria,. The choir is affiliated with the University of Melbourne, but is also open to non-students who are willing and able to perform to the choirs standards.

MUCS is one of the founding choirs of the Intervarsity Choral Festival (Australia), although it has not been a member since 2012. It is also an affiliated member of the Australian National Choral Association.

== History ==
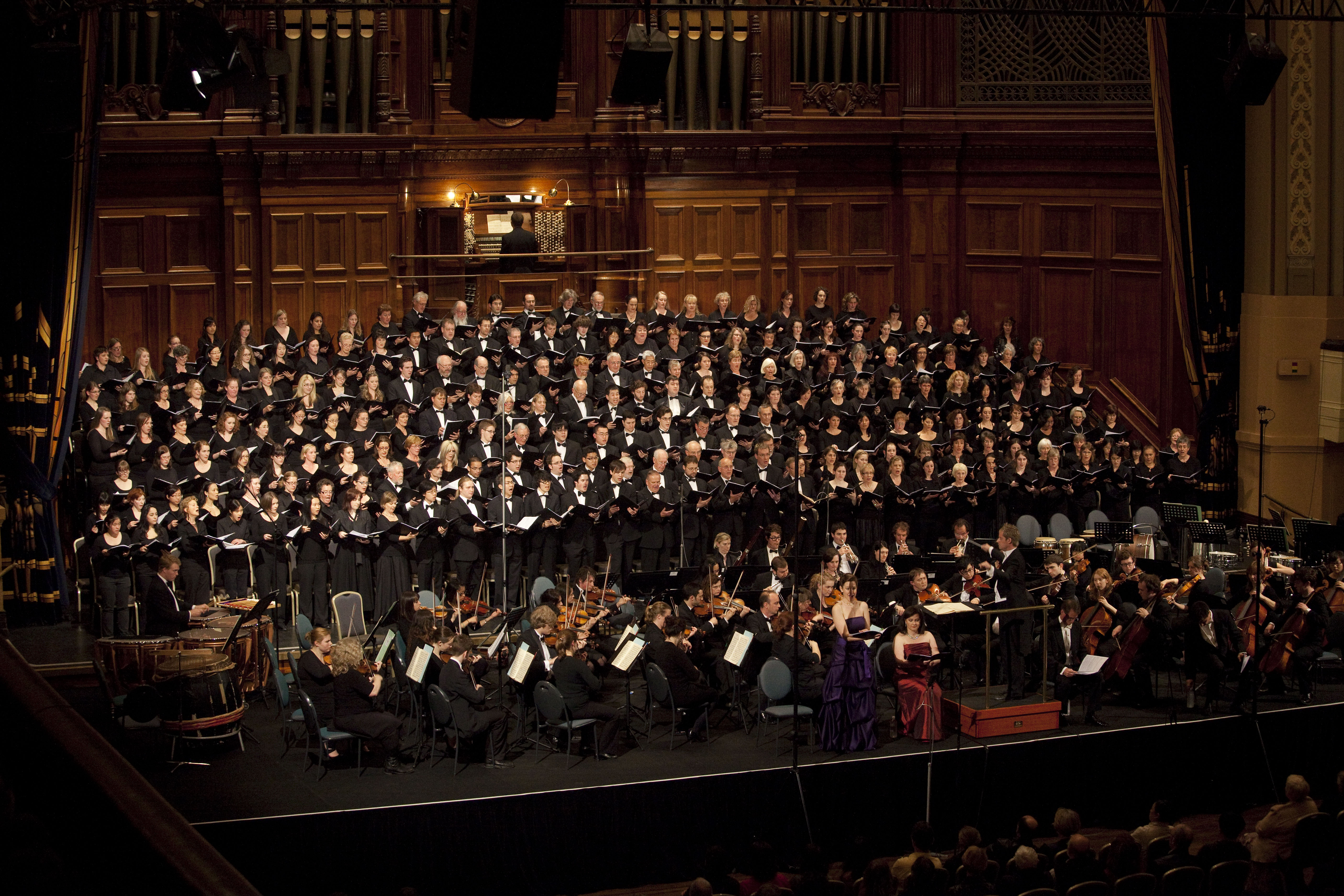
Melbourne University Choral Society and Royal Melbourne Philharmonic performing Carmina Burana in Melbourne Town Hall

MUCS was established in 1939 when the University of Melbourne male and female glee clubs merged. The first conductor of this new combined choir was Dan Hardy from the Melbourne Conservatorium of Music. This new mixed choir flourished under Hardy, and within a few years the choir had grown to more than 100 members. In 1945, the choir began to present radio performances of madrigals and Christmas carols.

Dan Hardy eventually resigned in 1948. In the following eleven years the choir appointed a number of conductors, none of whom had the longevity of Hardy. In 1959 the choir would appoint George Logie-Smith as conductor. Logie-Smith envisioned a much more active and influential choir and as a result, MUCS began to perform larger works more regularly. Throughout the previous two decades MUCS had typically presented a single yearly concert of small and medium-sized works. However, in 1961, under the baton of Logie-Smith, MUCS gave three large concerts, including Handel's "Messiah" and Brahms's "A German Requiem". In the following years, MUCS performed Bach's Christmas Oratorio, Monteverdi's L’Orfeo, Orff's Carmina Burana, Purcell's Dido and Aeneas, and Beethoven's Mass in C major.

In 1993 MUCS, appointed its current conductor, Andrew Wailes. Following this appointment MUCS established a strong working relationship with the Royal Melbourne Philharmonic Choir and Orchestra, of which Wailes is also musical director and conductor. The two choirs and orchestra regularly perform joint concerts. Recent such performances include Vaughan Williams' A Sea Symphony in 2016 and Orff's Carmina Burana in 2015
