= Gary E. McPherson =

Australian musician and educator

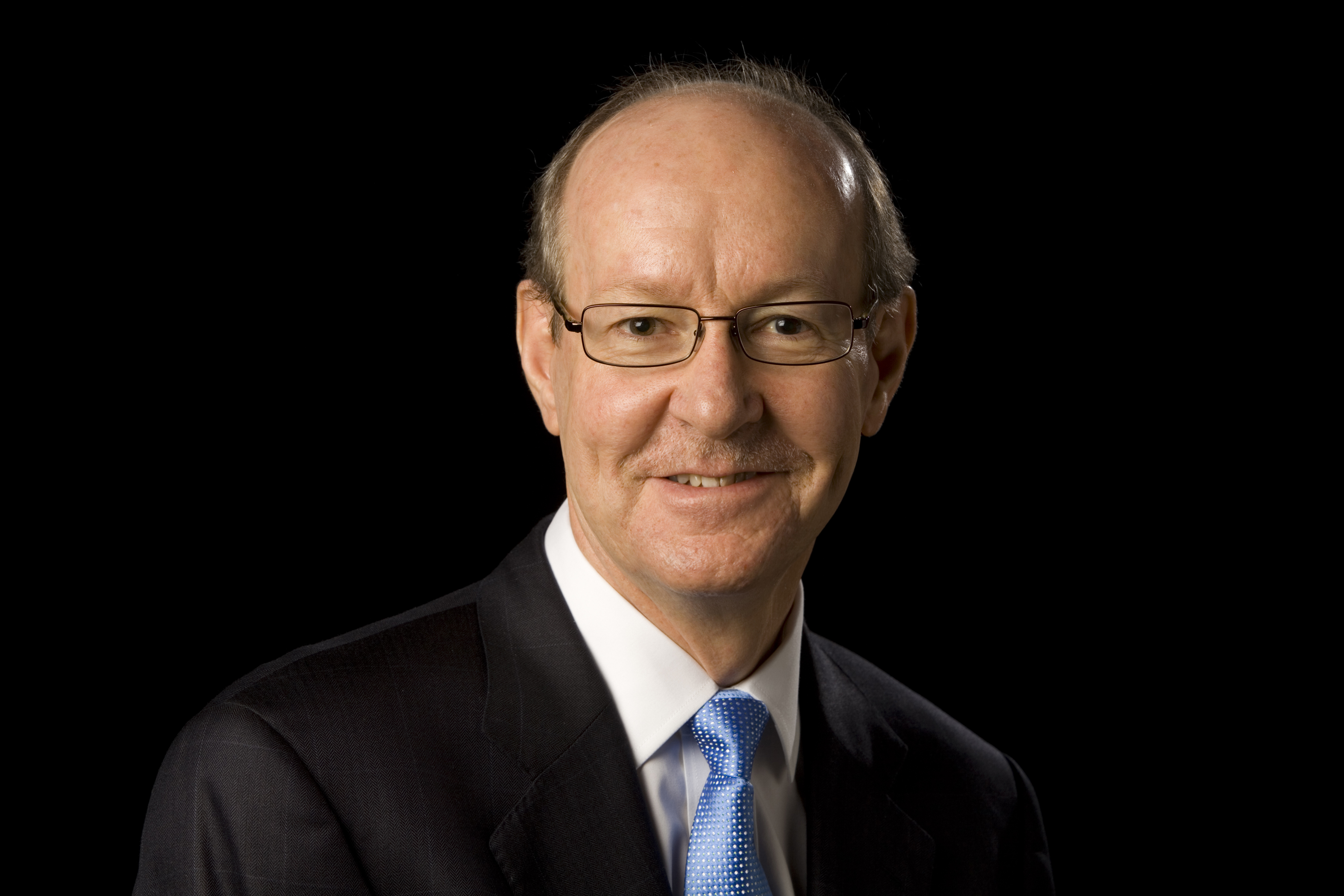
- Born: Gary Edward McPherson; 1 April 1954 (age 72); Parkes, New South Wales, Australia
- Occupations: Academic, musician

Academic background
- Education: University of Sydney
- Thesis: Factors and abilities influencing the development of visual, aural and creative performance skills in music and their educational implications

Academic work
- Institutions: Melbourne Conservatorium of Music; University of Melbourne
- Main interests: Music performance science, music education, music psychology
- Notable works: The child as musician: A handbook of musical development Music in our lives: Rethinking musical ability, development and identity

Gary Edward McPherson (born 1 April 1954) is an Australian music educator, academic and musician, who has researched various topics within the areas of musical development, music performance science and music psychology. He has served as the Ormond Chair of Music at the Melbourne Conservatorium of Music (MCM) since 2009 and between July 2009 and July 2019, served as director of the MCM at the University of Melbourne. McPherson's research primarily focuses on exploring the factors that influence the development of musical proficiency during childhood, later performance excellence, and the motivators of music participation in individuals of all ages and musical skill levels. Much of his research has been informed by his interest in the formation of musical abilities and identity in developing musicians. McPherson served as the foundation Professor of Creative Arts at the Hong Kong Institute of Education from 2002 to 2005. Prior to taking up his position at the MCM, he was a Professor of Music Education and the Marilyn Pflederer Zimmerman Endowed Chair in Music Education at the School of Music, University of Illinois at Urbana-Champaign from 2005 to 2009.

== Early life and education ==
As a boy McPherson played soprano cornet in the Parkes Town Band, and by the age of 16 had won over 50 regional, state and Australian titles before he changed to trumpet in the last two years of high school. He went on to complete a four-year Diploma of Music Education at the New South Wales State Conservatorium of Music, graduating in 1977. He obtained his Licentiate and Fellowship in Trumpet Performance from Trinity College, London in 1975–76 and then undertook a Master of Music Education at Indiana University, graduating in 1982. He earned his Ph.D. at the University of Sydney in 1993 with a dissertation entitled: ‘Factors and abilities influencing the development of visual, aural and creative performance skills in music and their educational implications’ which investigated the acquisition of five types of musical performance skills: performing rehearsed music, sight-reading, playing from memory, playing by ear, and improvising.

== Research ==
McPherson is a proponent of evidence-based approaches to music pedagogy and his work seeks to understand the nature of learning, musicianship and music performance.

His research has explored the acquisition of different facets of performance skills during childhood. He is known for having helped to introduce self-regulated learning, self-determination theory and self-efficacy research to music learning and teaching research in the context of better understanding the psychological dimensions which frame efficient and effective musical learning and development. Much of his research has been conducted with Australian students, where he has sought to understand how students’ self-belief and attitudes toward instrumental practice translate to success in the face of stressors, difficulties and competing interests.

He has developed new approaches in defining giftedness and talent in music performance that have highlighted the natural abilities, environmental and personal catalysts that distinguish between various types of musical competencies.

== Ormond Chair ==
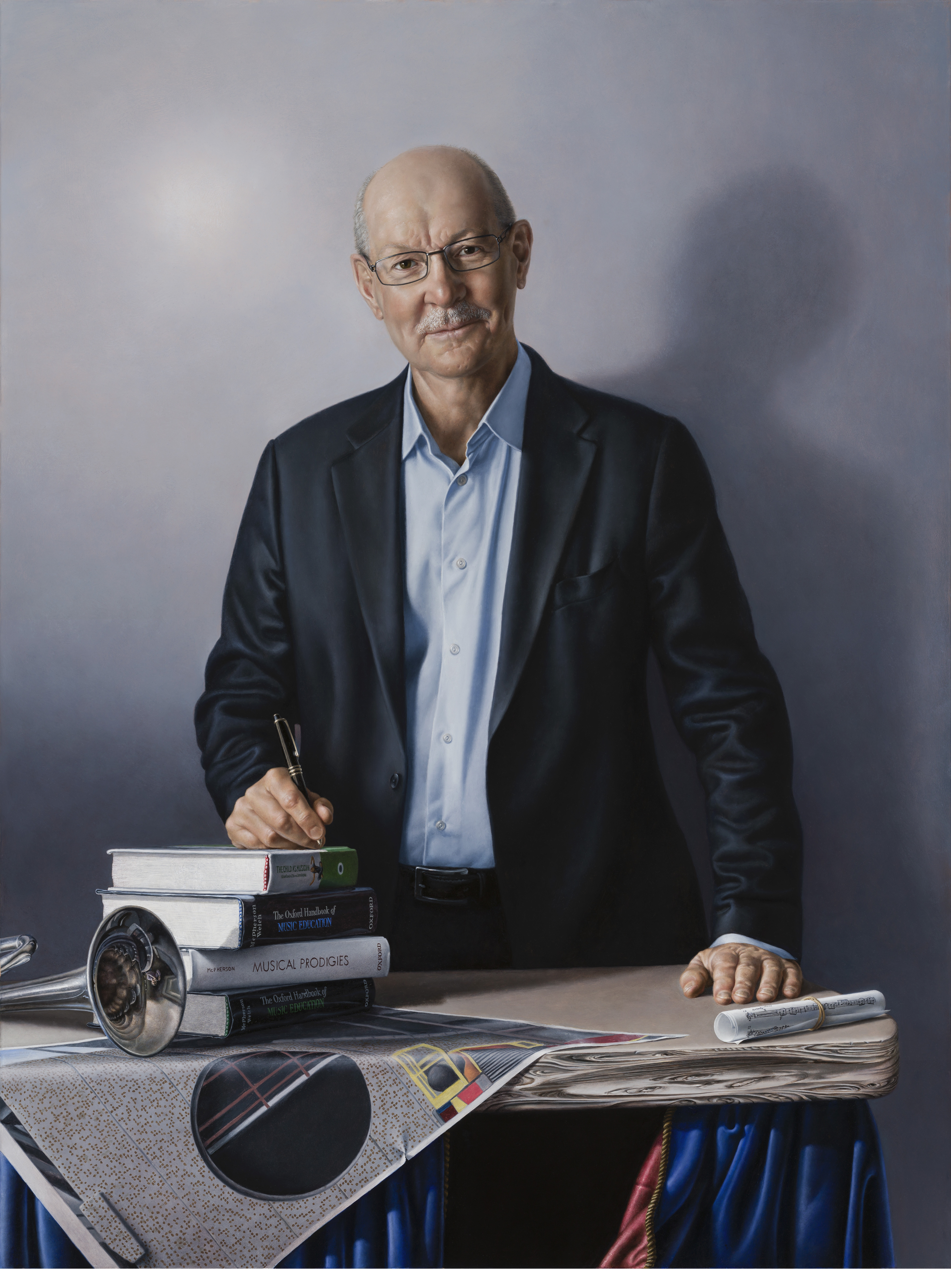
Professor Gary McPherson, by Andrew Mezei (2019). Collection; University of Melbourne, Melba Hall

The Ormond Chair of Music was endowed by Frances Ormond, a Scottish-Australian Pastoralist, member of the Parliament of Victoria and philanthropist. First occupied by George-Marshall-Hall from 1891 to 1900, it is the oldest endowed chair at the University of Melbourne. McPherson is the eighth Ormond Professor of Music at the University.

== Professional activities ==
McPherson has taught and lectured music students at primary, secondary, tertiary and graduate levels in music education, instrumental pedagogy, musicianship and musicology and served as a full-time professor at universities in Australia, Hong Kong and the United States. He has headed music and creative arts departments at several tertiary institutions, and held an honorary professorship in the Department of Cultural and Creative Arts, Hong Kong Institute of Education from 2009 to 2013. Since his appointment as director of the Melbourne Conservatorium in 2009, he has promoted the MCM as a centre of cross-disciplinary research. He has played a key role in the development of the Music, Mind and Wellbeing initiative; an ongoing collaboration between the MCM and the Melbourne School of Psychological Sciences.

In 1993, McPherson co-established the peer-reviewed journal Research Studies in Music Education, of which he is currently associate editor, and the Asia-Pacific Symposium on Music Education Research in 1997. He has served on the editorial boards of all the major English language research journals in music education., McPherson's wider academic work has been cited over 7000 times. He has supervised numerous master's degree and PhD students, many of whom have gone on to become distinguished researchers in their own right.

McPherson has held leadership roles within the Australian Society for Music Education for 18 years, serving as state chair, national president (1995–1997) and on state and national committees in New South Wales, Tasmania and Western Australia. He has held leadership roles within the International Society for Music Education for 36 years, beginning as review editor for the International Journal of Music Education, and then moving to serve as treasurer (1996–2000), executive committee and member of the ISME board of directors, president-elect (2002–2004), president (2004–2006), past president (2006–2008), chair of the ISME Constitution, Bylaws and Policy Manual Review Committee (2014–2018), and ISME Parliamentarian (2020-2024). He has also served as an executive board member of UNESCO International Music Council (2011–2013), and board member of the Music Council of Asia and Oceania (2011–2013). Largely informed by his corpus of work looking at attitudes of musicians toward their own practice, and broader community perceptions of music learning, he has worked extensively to promote the value of music training and exposure in people of all ages, particularly in childhood, having given hundreds of teacher workshops and presentations across all parts of Australia, Europe, the UK and the USA.

McPherson was chair of the scientific committee convening the International Symposium of Performance Science hosted by the University of Melbourne in July 2019. He has consulted for the Music Sector Development Plan for UNESCO's International Music Council from 2008. He also serves on the Federal Board of the Australian Music Examinations Board. As chair of the International Society for Music Education Constitution, Bylaws and Policy Manual Review Committee from 2012 to 2018, he oversaw a complete overhaul of the governance and workings of the society. McPherson was a co-founder, along with Hong Soo Lee (Korea) and Tadahiro Murao (Japan), of Asia-Pacific Symposium on Music Education Research (APSMER), to provide a forum for Asia-Pacific researchers, graduate students and teachers in music education to meet every two years. He served on its board of directors 1997–2009, and 2013–2017.

McPherson was a leading contributor in the planning of the new multimillion-dollar Melbourne Conservatorium of Music and Victorian College of the Arts Precinct in Southbank, Melbourne. The opening of the Ian Potter Southbank Centre in 2019 allowed the MCM's specialist music degrees to be relocated from the Parkville to Southbank campus, where it had been operating for over 100 years.

== Music performance ==
As trumpeter and conductor, McPherson has worked with many classical and contemporary music organisations throughout his career, including the West Australian Symphony Orchestra, Canberra Symphony Orchestra and the Australian Opera Company. He has also performed and recorded extensively with smaller ensembles, and for the Australian Broadcasting Corporation, and served as an adjudicator for competitions and eisteddfods throughout Australia.

== Honours and awards ==
McPherson was awarded an Artium Doctorem Honoris Causa, Honorary Doctorate at the Faculty of Fine and Performing Arts, Lund University, Sweden in 2021. He has also been conferred Honorary Life Membership of the International Society of Music Education and is a Fellow of the Australian Society for Music Education.

McPherson was raised in the central west NSW town of Parkes. He is the recipient of the second awarded Star of Parkes Shire (star 3034556 Lyra), a symbolic honour presented by the Mayor of the Parkes Shire Council, in the tradition of presenting the key to the city. This award marked his outstanding contribution to music and music education that brings credit to his hometown of Parkes. The stars are reflective of the most iconic symbol of the Parkes Shire, the Parkes Radio Telescope (the ‘Dish), and was presented at the opening of the Cooke Park Performance Stage on April 2, 2022.

McPherson is patron to four Australian music education organisations, including the National Institute of Youth Performing Arts and the Australian Piano Award. He has received numerous faculty awards for his teaching and research over his career.

== Publications ==
McPherson has published many edited books and book chapters, encyclopedia entries, monographs, and edited conference proceedings. Examples of edited or co-edited/authored volumes for Oxford University Press include The Child as Musician, The Oxford Handbook of Music Education, and Music in our Lives: Rethinking Musical Ability, Identity and Development.

The Oxford Handbook of Music Performance, of which McPherson is editor, consists of a two volume, fifty four chapter compendium that involves eighty scholars from thirteen countries. Don Hodges, who reviewed this publication for Psychology of Music described it as standing "head, shoulders, and torso above anything else that is available in the way of music psychology research applied to music performance".

An interview chapter that chronicles McPherson's personal and professional life was published by Bembenutty in 2022.

=== Interviews ===
- Bembenutty, H. (2022). An Interview with Gary E. McPherson: The Pioneer of the Development of Self-Regulation Music Expertise. Contemporary pioneers in teaching and learning, Vol. II (pp. 173–196). North Carolina: Information Age Publishing.

=== Selected edited books ===
- Sundin, B., McPherson, G. E., & Folkestad, G. (Eds.), (1998). Children composing. Lund: Lunds University (Malmö Academy of Music), Sweden. ISBN 91-630-7039-1. (with accompanying CD recording).
- Parncutt, R., & McPherson, G. E. (Eds.), (2002). The science and psychology of music performance: Creative strategies for music teaching and learning. New York: Oxford University Press. ISBN 0-19-513810-4.
- McPherson, G. E. (2006), (Ed.). The child as musician: A handbook of musical development. Oxford: Oxford University Press. ISBN 0-19-853031-5 (Hardcover); 0-19-853032-3 (Softcover).
- Tafuri, J. & McPherson, G. E. (Eds.), (2007). Orientamenti per la didattica strumentale Dall’esperienza alla ricerca. Lucca: Libreria Musicale Italiana.
- McPherson, G. E., & Welch, G. W. (Eds.), (2012). The Oxford handbook of music education. New York: Oxford University Press. Two volumes involving 156 authors (24 countries) and 118 contributions (1,671 pages).
- McPherson, G. E. (Ed.), (2016). The child as musician: A handbook of musical development. Second edition, Oxford: Oxford University Press. Update and expansion of 2006 volume from 24 to 45 chapters.
- McPherson, G. E. (Ed.), (2016). Musical prodigies: Interpretations from psychology, education, musicology and ethnomusicology. Oxford: Oxford University Press. Involves 34 chapters by leading experts in psychology, music education, musicology and ethnomusicology.
- McPherson, G. E., & Welch, G. W. (Eds.), (2018). Creativities, technologies, and media in music learning and teaching: An Oxford handbook of music education. Volume 5. New York: Oxford University Press.
- McPherson, G. E., & Welch, G. W. (Eds.), (2018). Special needs, adult learning, and community music: An Oxford handbook of music education. Volume 4. New York: Oxford University Press.
- McPherson, G. E., & Welch, G. W. (Eds.), (2018). Vocal, instrumental, and ensemble learning and teaching: An Oxford handbook of music education. Volume 3. New York: Oxford University Press.
- McPherson, G. E., & Welch, G. W. (Eds.), (2018). Music learning and teaching in infancy, childhood, and adolescence: An Oxford handbook of music education. Volume 2. New York: Oxford University Press.
- McPherson, G. E., & Welch, G. W. (Eds.), (2018). Music and music education in people’s lives: An Oxford handbook of music education. Volume 1. New York: Oxford University Press.
- McPherson, G. E. (2022). The Oxford handbook of music performance. New York: Oxford University Press. 2 Volumes.

=== Books ===
- McPherson, G. E., Davidson, J. W., & Faulkner, R. (2012). Music in our lives: Rethinking musical ability, development and identity. Oxford: Oxford University Press.

=== Notable refereed articles ===
- McPherson, G. E. (2005). From child to musician: Skill development during the beginning stages of learning an instrument. Psychology of Music, 33(1), 5–35.
- McPherson, G. E., & McCormick, J. (2006). Self-efficacy and performing music. Psychology of Music, 34(3), 321–336.
- McPherson, G. E., O’Neill, S. (2010). Students’ motivation to study music as compared to other school subjects: a comparison of eight countries. Research Studies in Music Education, 32(2), 101–137.
- McPherson, G. E., Osborne, M., Davidson, J. W., Barrett, M., & Faulkner, R. (2015). Motivation to study music in Australian schools: the impact of music learning, gender, and socio-economic status. Research Studies in Music Education, 37(2), 141–160.
- McPherson, G. E., Osborne, M. S., Evans, P., & Miksza, P. (2019). Applying self-regulated learning microanalysis to study musicians’ practice. Psychology of Music, 47(1), 18–32.
- McPherson, G. E., Osborne, M. S., Evans, P., & Miksza, P. (2019). Applying self-regulated learning microanalysis to study musicians’ practice. Psychology of Music, 47(1), 18-32. https://doi.org/10.1177/0305735617731614
- McPherson, G. E., Blackwell, J., & Hattie, J. (2022). Feedback in music learning and teaching. Frontiers Performance Science. https://doi.org/10.3389/fpsyg.2022.891025
