= Royal Melbourne Philharmonic =

Choir and Orchestra in Melbourne, Australia

- Choir and Orchestra
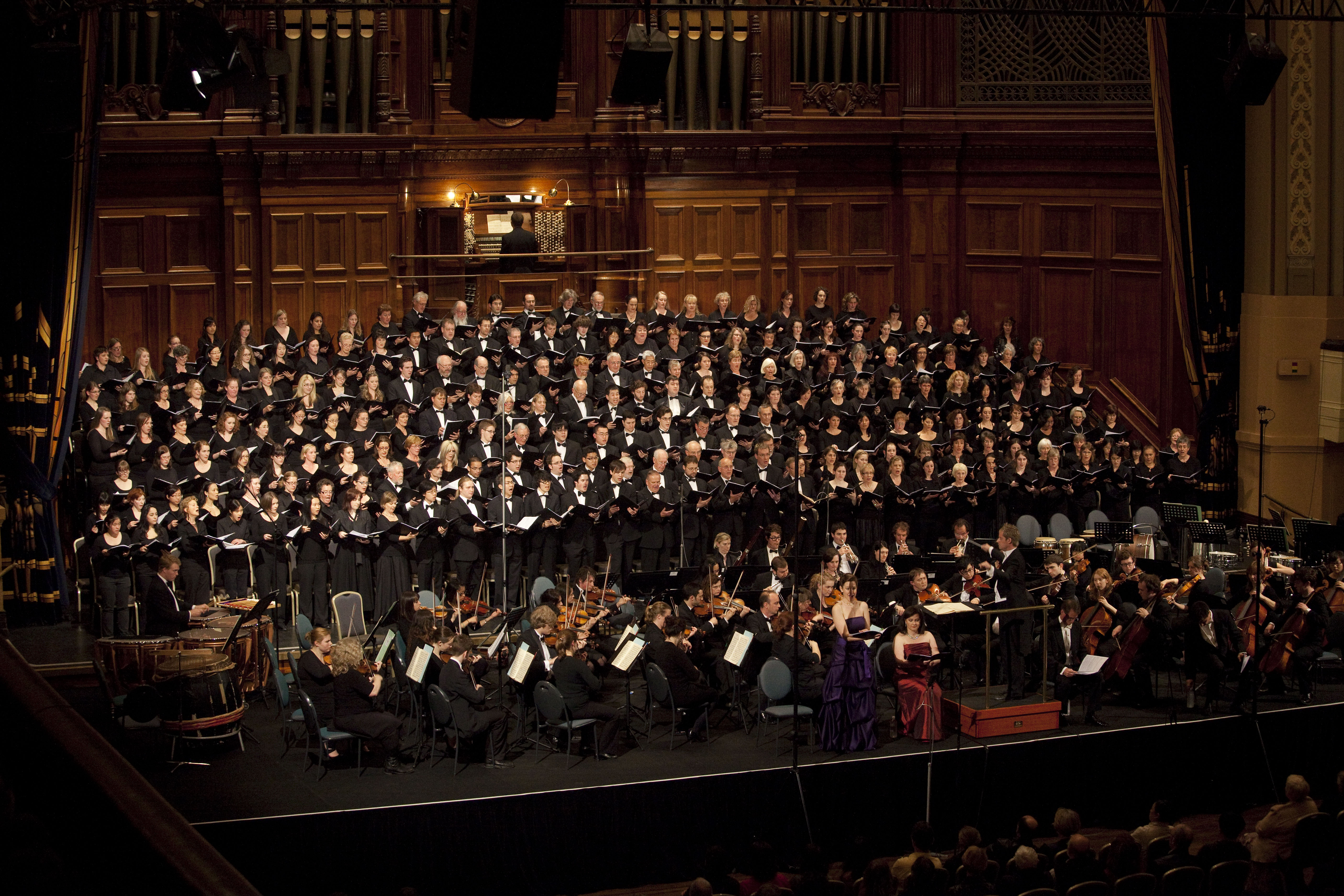
- RMP Performing at Melbourne Town Hall
- Short name: RMP
- Founded: 1853
- Location: Melbourne, Victoria, Australia
- Principal conductor: Andrew Wailes
- Website: rmp.org.au

Royal Melbourne Philharmonic (RMP) is a 120-voice choir and orchestra in Melbourne, Victoria, Australia. It was established in 1853, and is reportedly Australia's oldest surviving cultural organisation. The Royal Melbourne Philharmonic is Australia's oldest musical organisation that has been continuously existing for over 150 years. Among its programmes, there have been large-scale concerts celebrating classical composers including Bach, Mendelssohn and Beethoven. The Royal Melbourne Philharmonic is managed under the direction of Andrew Wailes, the artistic director of the orchestra.

== History ==
=== Early years ===
The Royal Melbourne Philharmonic was founded in 1853 and the orchestra was then called the Melbourne Philharmonic Society. One of its founders was Charles La Trobe, who was the appointed superintendent of New South Wales in 1839. The original purpose of creating the organisation was to hold regular performances on a non-profit basis.

=== Britain's influence ===
During the 19th century, British musical taste was dominating the RMP's opinion in making musical decisions, including selecting performance repertoires, outlining the list of the programmes as well as employing the concert pitch. George Peake, the appointed conductor of the Philharmonic in 1889 to 1911, decided the high Philharmonic pitch to be employed for the orchestra instead of using the normal pitch or the French pitch, as the high pitch was still being used by the orchestras in the UK (ibid.).

=== World Wars and Great Depression era ===
During the First and Second World Wars, two oratorios, Elijah and Messiah had always dominated the Philharmonic's concert program. The main reason for the Philharmonic to depend on the two oratorios was the high demand from the listeners during that time, which helped the Philharmonic in receiving financial income. There was a decline of appreciation toward large-choral societies during the outbreak of the second world war. During those times less singers joined the Philharmonic, particularly the men, and there were less regular concerts being performed by the Philharmonic. Eight conductors were appointed one after another during the second world war with the aim of gaining more attention from the audience yet the attempts were unsuccessful.

During the Great Depression era in 1927, Bernard Heinze, the conductor of the Philharmonic appointed Alberto Zelman as the new conductor. In 1936, the Commission of the Royal Melbourne Philharmonic agreed to do a reformation and reconstitution of the management system as well as the orchestra. The ex-conductor of the Philharmonic, Bernard Heinze, was appointed to be the commission's musical advisor. He became a part of the Commission together with Charles Moses as the general manager, William James as the federal controller of music and W. J. Cleary as the chairman of the commission. The role of the commission was to give inputs and plans related to the Philharmonics' practices, repertoires, customs and hiring. The chorus master of the choir, Dan Hardy, was replaced by George English. New repertoires were added to the Philharmonic's concert program, including Bach's Mass in B minor, Walton's Belshazzar's Feast and Verdi's Requiem.

=== Financial ===
The Philharmonic received financial support from the government, where they were granted about $20,000 annually. In 2014, the annual funding from the City of Melbourne had discontinued as they removed the Philharmonic from the council's grants lists. Since then, RMP has been relying on their income from donations, fundraising, membership fees and box office. Andrew Wailes, the director of the Philharmonic, reported that these were not enough to cover all of their operational expenses.

=== The ABC ===
The Royal Melbourne Philharmonic began to have a contractual agreement with the Australian Broadcasting Commission (ABC) on 17 August 1936, wherein the ABC took over the choir. As the Philharmonic entered a contract with the ABC, the burden of orchestral members fees and promotional costs were reduced. Based on the agreement with ABC, the RMP had given permission for ABC to do an audition and replacement of choir members. The ABC also gained the authorisation to nominate the conductors, soloists, choirmaster and the repertoires to be performed. The ABC retained any profits made by the choir as well as the Philharmonic concerts, and they were also responsible for any financial risk related to the concert expenses and covered most of its disbursements. The ABC continued to work with the Philharmonic throughout the 1960s, delivering mostly choral works in the concerts.

The structure of the organisation began to change in 1969 due to the performance standard of the Philharmonic that started to decline in the 1960. The Philharmonic's original agreement with the ABC was terminated in the year of the changes to the organisation and a new contract with the ABC along with the revised agreement was issued in 1970. The ABC and the Philharmonic agreed on improving the quality of performance. The ABC took over the control of the RMP's concerts entirely and did a strict audition to the choristers. By 1970 to 1975, the Philharmonic became a regular part of ABC's programs, including Red and Blue series and the annual prom concert at the Moomba Festival.

The Philharmonic's contract with the ABC ended in 1986 and it has been replaced by the Melbourne Chorale as the choir of choice for the ABC.

=== Reputation ===
In 1891, the orchestra members of the Philharmonic were said to be miming during the concert by George Peake, the appointed conductor of the orchestra. The Philharmonic was facing concerns by the audience in 1922 to 1935, as the orchestra did not play in time and in tune, and there was no strict audience conduct. This was because the musical ability of the members did not meet the minimum standard of playing the repertoire.

In 1935, Bernard Heinze, the conductor of the Philharmonic, felt depressed due to the choristers' performance quality, as their vocal technique had not improved. This happened as there was a lack of community support and interest to participate in the choir, hence they were not able to attract the performers that met the requirement.

The auditions for choir and orchestral members began to occur after the RMP signed the partnership agreement with the ABC. All of the applicants, including the current members, were required to do an audition in front of the committee and the representation of the Society. The Philharmonic regained a surge of popularity under the ABC's management by appearing on their TV programmes and events.

After 1975, the popularity of the RMP started to decline due to the listeners' demand that favoured more of the chorale works which were regularly presented by the Melbourne Chorale and the Melbourne University Choral Society.

== Venues ==
The Royal Exhibition Building used to be the main concert venue for the Melbourne Philharmonic Society from 1854 to 1866. The RMP performed its Christmas Oratorio regularly in the Exhibition Building for twenty years, and by the following year, there was a decline in the frequency of concerts at the premises. Since then, most of the Philharmonic's regular concerts have been held at Melbourne Town Hall. The first performance of the Philharmonic at Melbourne Town Hall was held in November 1874, where 300 musicians performed Adoration, a religious cantata composed and conducted by Austin T. Turner.

== Concerts and programmes ==
RMP has given 15 concerts within 2 years since they first established. In 1883, the Philharmonic were given the opportunity by Nicholson & Co., a music emporium located in Melbourne, to hold a concert with selected works chosen by the secretary of the Society as well as the conductor. They presented the first hearing of Dvorak's Stabat Mater in Australia on 29 September 1885 as a result. The premiere received a large appreciation and success, which gave them a great renown for their existence.

=== Messiah, Elijah and Christmas tradition ===
The RMP has had a long tradition of playing the Messiah and Mendelssohn's Elijah during the Christmas season as well as producing choral works in the Australian premieres. Within 21 years starting from 1919 to 1939, RMP had performed Handel's Messiah on 37 occasions. In 1998, The Royal Melbourne Philharmonic orchestra and choir presented The Magic Moments from Opera Concert, a fund-raising concert for the Christmas Toy Appeal. By August 2014, The RMP had performed Messiah for 234 times with 250 part-time musicians and singers participating in it. The Philharmonic also presented both Messiah and Carols at the AFL grand final, Anzac Day service, international rugby games and Melbourne Cup.

=== 21st century ===
On 31 July 2004, the Royal Melbourne Philharmonic held their 74th concert presenting Mendelssohn's oratorio, Elijah. The concert was performed at Melbourne Town Hall under the baton of John Lemmone, with Kirsti Harms on Soprano, David Hobson on Tenor and Rodney Macann on bass and baritone. The Royal Melbourne Philharmonic Choir had collaborated with the Californian orchestra, Stanford Symphony Orchestra at Royal Melbourne Townhall. It is the first collaboration of NSW's long history with the US musicians, where 135 singers from Stanford Symphony Orchestra and 130 NSW singers joined together to perform the Requiem at the Opera House on 26 June 2005. RMP held multiple concerts performing Lux Aeterna in 2012 to 2013, a repertoire comprising religious texts which was composed by an Australian composer, Morten Lauridsen.

On 27 February 2015 The RMP presented three parts of Beethoven's works in collaboration with the Australian Ballet, the Melbourne Symphony Orchestra and Orchestra Victoria. The performance was held at Hamer Hall with Diego Matheuz as the principal guest conductor, featuring an RMP Aria Competition winner Christopher Richardson, the British soprano Susan Gritton, Palestinian-Israeli pianist Saleem Ashkar and Australian singers including Fiona Campbell and Jacqueline Porter. On 12 May 2018, the Philharmonic collaborated with the Melbourne University Choral Society presenting a Mozart-themed concert at St. Paul's Cathedral in Melbourne. The concert started with a Clarinet Concerto, followed by the C minor Mass with full formation of the orchestra playing and ended with Mozart's small piece, Ave Verum Corpus.

The Royal Melbourne Philharmonic concerts presenting Tchaikovsky's cantata that was planned to be held in May has been postponed to 2021 due to the coronavirus pandemic. They are preparing to release and sell digital performances of the Philharmonic's concerts from their archives in the coming months.

=== Vocal competition ===
RMP has presented a series of vocal competitions, known as the Royal Melbourne Philharmonic Aria, focusing on oratorio performances. In 2018, there were more than 100 participants joining the twelfth edition of the contest, with Cassandra Wright, a mezzo-soprano singer as the winner. Louis Hurley, a tenor singer, won first place the following year by performing a work from Benjamin Britten in the latest competition, which was held in August 2019.

== Conductors ==
- John Russell (1853–1856)
- Herr Elsasser (1856–1859)
- C. E. Horsley (1859–1861)
- G. R. G. Pringle (1861–1865)
- David Lee (1865–1878)
- Joseph Summers (1878–1881)
- George Peake (1881–1901)
- Alberto Zelman (1901–1927)
- Sir Bernard Heinze (1927–1954)
- Dan Hardy (1957–1969)
- David Plummer (1970)
- Judith Potter (1970–1971)
- Leonard Dommett (1972–1973)
- John Symons (1973–1975)
- Squadron Leader Laurie H. Hicks, OBE (1975)
- David Carolane (1976–1981)
- Prof Michael Brimer (1982)
- David Wyatt (1983)
- Dr Andrew Blackburn (1984–1988)
- Warwick Stengards (1988–1991)
- Prof Warren Bebbington (1992–1993)
- Ian Harrison (1994–1995)
- Peter Bandy (1996–1998)
- Andrew Wailes (1998–present)

Although when it was founded, the RMP Orchestra was Melbourne's premier orchestra, many of the orchestra's earlier members merged with the then fledgling Melbourne Symphony Orchestra and it lost its separate identity. The RMP has since reestablished its own orchestra and regularly performs both with and without the RMP Choir. Members of the choir are unpaid volunteers.

The RMP has participated at a number of important historical events, including the opening of the Melbourne Town Hall in 1870, the Melbourne International Exhibition of 1880, the Great Centennial Exhibition of 1888, the opening of the first Parliament of Australia at the Royal Exhibition Building in 1901, the 1956 Summer Olympics, and the Centenary of Australian Federation celebrations in 2001.

The RMP has performed Handel's Messiah at least once every year since 1853, a world record for an unbroken sequence of annual performances of this oratorio.

It has presented the Australian premieres of such works as Mozart's Requiem, Bach's St Matthew Passion, Handel's Israel in Egypt and Jephtha, Mendelssohn's Elijah, Vivaldi's Gloria, Dvořák's Stabat Mater, Elgar's The Kingdom, Walton's Belshazzar's Feast and others.

The current music director and chief conductor is Andrew Wailes. Earlier chief conductors have included Alberto Zelman and Sir Bernard Heinze. Heinze held the post from 1927 to 1953; was named honorary life conductor in the early 1960s, and made his last appearance on the RMP's podium in 1978. Guest conductors have included Sir Malcolm Sargent, Sir Thomas Beecham, George Szell, Sir Granville Bantock, Sir Eugene Goossens and Sir Charles Groves.
