= George Stewart McManus =

American pianist and organist

George Stewart McManus (1887 – 17 July 1981) was an American pianist and organist, Professor Emeritus of the University of California, Los Angeles (UCLA).

== History ==
He was pianist and accompanist for cellist Jean Gérardy's successful tour of Australasia from April to September 1923.

He was a faculty member of UCLA from 1929, serving as chairman of the Music Department from 1930 to 1932. He rejoined the faculty in 1939, serving as chairman of the Music Department from 1939 to 1947 and University organist until 1947, when he retired.
