= Alberto Zelman (senior) =

Trieste-born Australian composer, music conductor, music teacher, organist and pianist

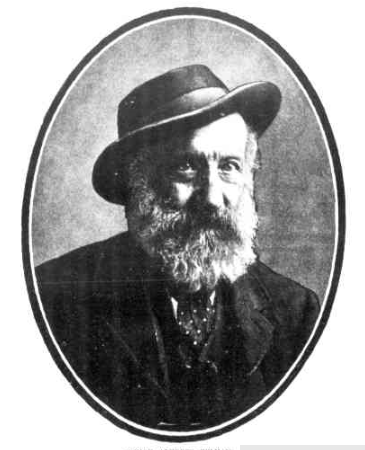
Alberto Zelman (senior)

Alberto Zelman (1832 – 28 December 1907) was a Trieste-born Australian composer, music conductor, music teacher, organist and pianist.

He was born at Trieste, Austria (now part of Italy), of Italian parents. He was educated as a musician and made his mark as a conductor in northern Italy. He then went to Calcutta, India, where he was successful for some years as a teacher and conductor, and about 1870 came to Australia as conductor of an opera company. He settled at Melbourne, was much esteemed as a man and as a musician, was for many years conductor of the Melbourne Liedertafel, and was a well-known piano teacher.

Zelman compositions included orchestral works, masses and many solos for the violin. He died at Melbourne in 1907 leaving a widow and four sons.

His son, also named Alberto Zelman, was also a musician and the founder of the Albert Street Conservatorium Orchestra which, in 1927, combined with the Melbourne University Symphony Orchestra to form the Melbourne Symphony Orchestra. Another son, Victor Zelman, was a painter and etcher.
