= Australian Children's Choir =

Children's Choir in Melbourne, Australia

- Mixed-voice children's choir
- Also known as: ACC
- Origin: Melbourne, Victoria, Australia
- Founded: 1976
- Genre: Classical, contemporary, popular
- Members: ~200
- Music director: Daniel Brinsmead
- Chief conductor: Daniel Brinsmead
- Website: www.australianchildrenschoir.com.au

The Australian Children's Choir (ACC), founded in 1976, is a mixed-voice children's choir based in Melbourne, Australia, and consisting of some 200 boys and girls aged 5 to 20 in six different training ensembles. The choir has developed a strong reputation for its refined performances, varied repertoire and the production of fine young musicians, many of whom have gone on to pursue successful musical careers.

== Members ==
There are approximately 200 singers in the choir, ranging in age from 5 to 20, and composed of five groups: Lyrebirds, Melody, Harmony, Intermediate, Treble, and Senior Choristers. The young singers who comprise the Senior Choir of the Australian Children's Choir meet twice a week to rehearse outside school hours, and must demonstrate a high degree of musical ability, personal organisation and concentration to become join its ranks. In return, they receive many musical and social opportunities, and take on the role of young ambassadors for both the ACC and their country.

== Touring ==
The choir regularly tours throughout Australia and has made regular international tours, to countries including England, Hong Kong, Wales, and New Zealand. In 2004 the ACC undertook a major concert tour of Europe and the United Kingdom, performing in cities such as Vienna, Salzburg, Prague, Edinburgh, Cambridge and London. In 2005 the choir toured New Zealand for the second time, and in January 2007 the ACC undertook its first concert tour of mainland China, performing in cities such as Beijing, Xian, Shanghai, Tianjin and Huangyan. In 2015, The ACC travelled to the United States to tour the East Coast and participate in the Washington D.C. Serenade Festival. The choir also made appearances in Toronto. In 2016, the Australian Children's Choir toured the East Coast of Australia to mark its 40th anniversary, making appearances in Brisbane, the Gold Coast including Surfers Paradise, Sydney and Wollongong. The ACC toured Europe in 2018 performing in Austria, The Czech Republic, Slovakia, Hungary and visiting Germany. They more recently toured New Zealand in 2024 for a performance in the World Choir Games, performing in both the Youth choirs and Sacred choir categories. Their performances gained a silver and gold medal respectively. In June and July 2026, The Australian Children’s Choir undertook a concert tour of Italy as part of its 50th anniversary celebrations. The choir performed in several major Italian cities, including Rome, Florence and Verona, presenting a repertoire of sacred and secular choral works.

A highlight of the tour was an invitation for the choir to sing during Mass at St Peter’s Basilica in Vatican City. The choir also participated in the Festival Internazionale Corale Verona Garda, performing as part of the festival program and at its closing ceremony.

The tour included performances and cultural activities in Rome, Florence, Verona, Venice and Milan, providing an opportunity for choristers to perform in significant Italian venues and to represent the choir internationally during its 50th anniversary year.

== Engagements ==
The ACC regularly appears in concert with many of Melbourne's leading musical ensembles, including groups such as the Melbourne Symphony Orchestra, Royal Melbourne Philharmonic, the Academy of Melbourne, the Central Band of the RAAF, the Australian Classical Players, Royal Australian Naval Band, and the Victorian Police Showband.

Highlights in recent years have included Mahler's 8th Symphony with the Melbourne Symphony Orchestra under conductor Markus Stenz, a featured appearance at the nationally televised AFI Awards Ceremony, numerous televised performances on Rove Live, and concerts with the legendary rock band Kiss and the Melbourne Symphony at the Telstra Dome. The ACC appeared at the 2004 AFL Grand Final. It participated in a series of filmed international television commercials for the Korean Motor Company Kia, filmed on various locations around Victoria, and gave a live televised performance to an estimated one billion people for China Television to mark the 30th anniversary of Australian-Chinese relations. The Choir has performed at opening ceremonies at both Marvel and AMI stadiums

Leading artists the choir has recently appeared with include Julie Anthony, Marina Prior, Rhonda Burchmore, Marcia Hines, Delta Goodrem, Rove McManus, David Hobson and Peter Brocklehurst. Past recordings include John Farnham's Whispering Jack album, and the single "You're the Voice", as well as Missy Higgins, and numerous recordings ranging from folk music and commercials to movie soundtracks.

The choir has produced five CDs; Leave No Song Unsung (which was nominated for a Sounds Australian Award in 2004 for best Choral Recording),Christmas Lullaby, featuring music for the festive season and Like a Rainbow. Fire in The Heavens was recorded to commemorate the Black Saturday Bushfires. More recently Australian Stories was released - songs of the Great South Land. These have been featured on ABC Classic and 3MBS FM.

2006 included performances of J.S. Bach's St Matthew Passion with the Melbourne Bach Choir, Stravinsky's Symphony of Psalms and Orff's Carmina Burana (with the Royal Melbourne Philharmonic) as well as the "Irish Songs of Praise" concerts and appearances at the Melbourne International Fashion Festival at BMW Edge and at the Stringybark Folk Festival. The choir also performed in concerts with the Salvation Army, a series of concerts with the Victoria Police Showband at the Police Academy, a series of concerts at The Australia Club, the RACV Club, several corporate performances at various venues around the city, including Banyule's Carols by Candlelight, and Carols in the Cathedral in St Paul's Cathedral. In 2007, the choir received a contract to perform in the Australian Ballet season of The Nutcracker at the State Theatre, Victoria. These were in addition to the numerous charity and local community performances the choir performs throughout the year.

In 2009 the choir started the year by performing (along with many other choirs) in the Day of Mourning for those lost during the Black Saturday bushfires. They also performed Gordon Kerry's Requiem Tropes, a work based on the Mozart Requiem. Throughout the year the choir also participated in several recording, including pieces such as "World Keeps Turning" by Jetty Road and "Advance Australia Fair" with Judith Durham. The choir ended their year with several Christmas performances, notably Carols in the Cathedral with the Royal Melbourne Philharmonic and several guest soloists.

== Artistic director ==
Daniel Brinsmead is the artistic director of the Australian Children's Choir and conducts the senior choristers.

== Patrons ==
- Malcolm Turnbull
- John Howard
- Jean Ashworth Bartle
- John Farnham
- Judith Durham
- Toni Lamond
- Maureen Milton
- John So
