= Fritz Hart =

British composer (1874–1949)

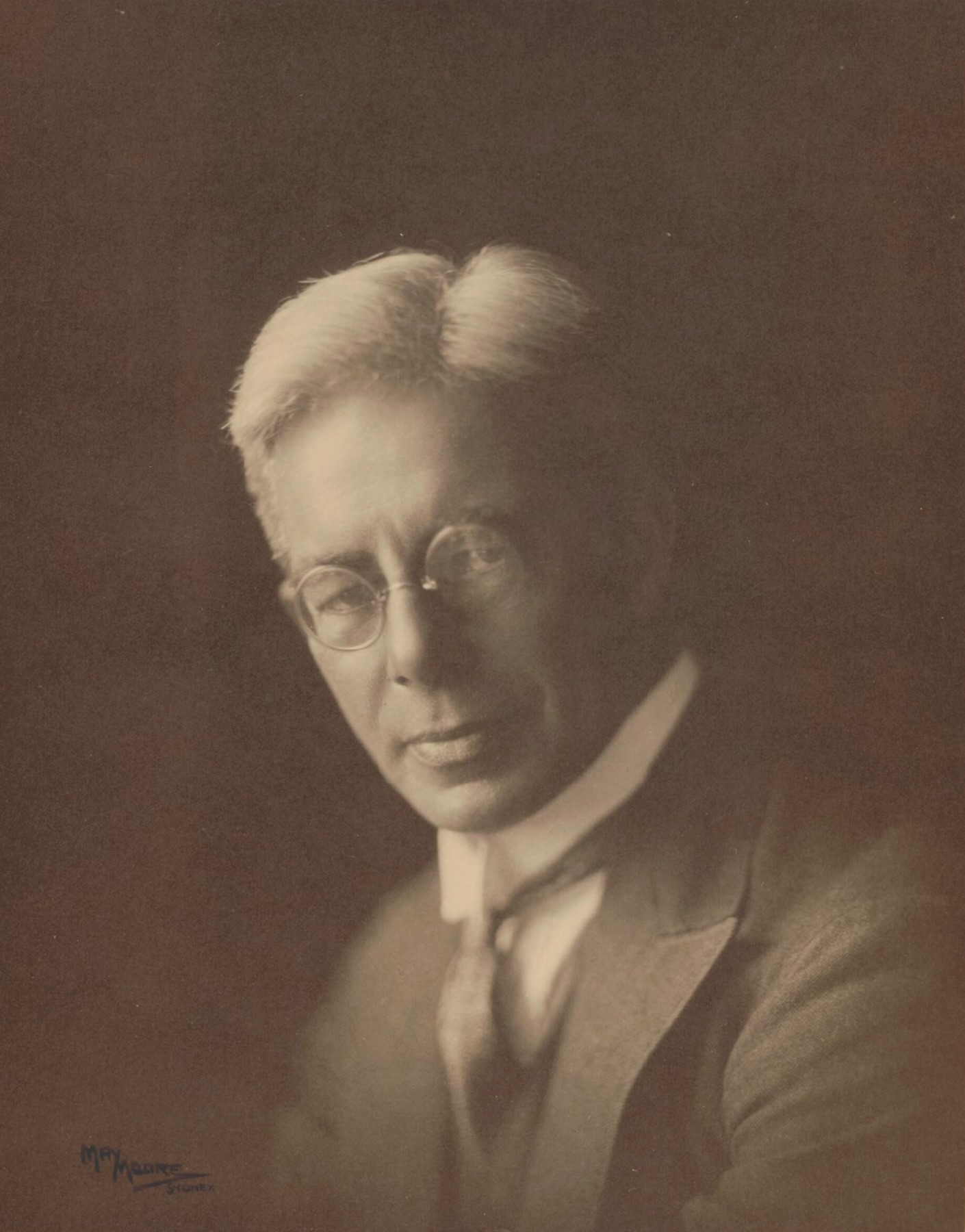
- Fritz Hart in 1927
- Born: 11 February 1874; Brockley, England
- Died: 9 July 1949 (aged 75); Honolulu, U.S.
- Education: Royal College of Music
- Occupations: Composer; Conductor; Academic teacher; Novelist
- Organizations: Albert Street Conservatorium

Fritz Bennicke Hart (11 February 1874 – 9 July 1949) was an English composer, conductor, teacher and unpublished novelist, who spent considerable periods in Australia and Hawaii.

== Early life ==
Hart was born in Brockley, originally in the English county of Kent but now part of the London Borough of Lewisham, the eldest child of Frederick Robinson Hart and his wife Jemima (Jemmima) Waters, née Bennicke. Both his parents were musical. From the age of six, Fritz sang in the parish choir his father ran, and his mother was a piano teacher. He spent three years as a chorister at Westminster Abbey, under Sir Frederick Bridge, and then went to the Royal College of Music in 1893, where he became acquainted with Gustav Holst, Samuel Coleridge-Taylor, William Hurlstone, Ralph Vaughan Williams and John Ireland. At one student concert in 1896, Hart played the cymbals, Vaughan Williams the triangle, Holst the trombone, and Ireland also played. Composition was not one of Hart's subjects at the RCM, but he nevertheless came under the influence of Charles Villiers Stanford.

He became one of Holst's closest friends, and they frequently collaborated. Holst set several of Hart's poems to music as songs or part-songs, and Hart wrote librettos for Holst's early operatic works.

Hart toured with a theatre company, during which time he wrote incidental music for Julius Caesar. He also wrote music for Romeo and Juliet, which he conducted himself. He then worked for various touring companies, which gave him exposure to operettas, musical comedy, dramatic incidental music and opera. He married in 1904, and his first child was born the following year.

== Australia ==
Hart sailed to Australia aboard R.M.S. China in May 1909, as part of a company contracted by J. C. Williamson's to play the operetta King of Cadonia. The initial contract for 12 months was extended to four years. In 1913 Hart and Alfred Hill founded the short-lived Australian Opera League. The first programme, on 3 August 1914, included the first performance of Hart's opera Pierrette.

In 1913 George Marshall-Hall, who founded Melbourne Conservatorium of Music and subsequently the rival Albert Street Conservatorium, left for London and Hart took over his lecturing duties at the latter institution, Eduard Scharf acting as director. A year later Marshall-Hall sent instruction that the Conservatorium was to be closed down, and Scharf found employment with the University, but other staff refused to resign and appointed Hart director. In 1915 Marshall-Hall was re-appointed professor of music at the University of Melbourne in 1915, and open to a merging of the two institutions but such was the anti-German attitude during World War I that the predominantly German staff expected adverse discrimination from the strongly pro-British University. Their fears were well-founded, as the brilliant pianist Scharf was dismissed on account of his birthplace, and ended up in a camp for enemy aliens. Nellie Melba established her school of singing there in 1915, and she and her pupils helped shape Hart's work as a composer. He had the overall responsibility for her students' musical training, many of whom made their marks internationally. The institution was renamed the Melba Conservatorium in 1956, after Hart's death.

In 1924 Hart was made a Fellow of the Royal College of Music. In 1927 he became acting conductor for the Melbourne Symphony Orchestra (MSO), and in 1928, after the death of Alberto Zelman, the permanent conductor. In 1932 the Melbourne University Conservatorium Orchestra and the MSO amalgamated under the joint conductorship of Hart and Bernard Heinze. In 1929 the MSO was the first Australian orchestra to play open-air concerts. These were in Melbourne's Alexandra Gardens, under the baton of Hart. These 'Popular Concerts' were made possible through a donation by Sidney Myer. Hart was highly regarded as a teacher, his pupils including Peggy Glanville-Hicks, Margaret Sutherland, Hubert Clifford and Robert Hughes.

After 1937 Hart returned to Melbourne only once, for the jubilee of the Albert Street conservatorium in July 1945 when he conducted several of his works.

His portrait was painted by, among other artists, Max Meldrum and is the National Gallery of Australia's collection. The National Library of Australia has another portrait, by A. D. Colquhoun.

== Hawaii ==
In December 1931 Hart was invited to be guest conductor of the Honolulu Symphony Orchestra. He returned annually, remaining there from December to April. The concert season in Hawaii was short, and occurred during the Australian summer when he was not required in Melbourne, so he was able to work for both orchestras.

Hart's wife died in 1935 and in September 1937 he married an American, Marvel Allison. In 1937 he became permanent conductor of the Honolulu Symphony Orchestra and first professor of music at the University of Hawaii, a position he retained until his retirement in 1942. He remained conductor of the Symphony Orchestra until his death.

Hart died on 9 July 1949 at Honolulu of cardiac disorder and was cremated, survived by his son and his second wife.

== Music ==
Hart excelled in writing for voices. He wrote 23 operas, of which 18 were composed in Melbourne and 4 in Hawaii. Seven of these were staged in his lifetime in Australia; none appear to have been staged in Britain. He was interested in the writers of the Celtic Twilight, and used librettos by W. B. Yeats, J. M. Synge, Augusta Gregory, and George Russell (AE). He also set texts by Shakespeare, Edmond Rostand, Molière, Edwin Arlington Robinson, and the Bible.

He wrote 514 songs, of which about half were composed in Melbourne and a quarter each in England and Hawaii; four large choral works, unaccompanied choruses, and part-songs. He was deeply attached to the poetry of Robert Herrick, and set his words 126 times. His choral works used texts by Shelley and Walt Whitman.

His Symphony, Op. 107, which was composed in Australia in 1934, has been described as "a landmark in Australian music". There are also 14 other orchestral works and numerous chamber and solo instrumental pieces, including two string quartets and three violin sonatas, transcriptions and arrangements.

Selected operas:

- The Land of Heart's Desire (1914)
- Riders to the Sea (1915)
- Deirdre of the Sorrows (1916)
- Ruth and Naomi (1917, Melbourne)
- Malvolio (1918, Melbourne)
- The Fantasticks (1919, Melbourne)
- Deirdre in Exile (1926, Melbourne)
- The Woman who Laughed at Faery (1929, Melbourne)
- St George and the Dragon (1931, Melbourne)
- Even Unto Bethlehem (1943, Honolulu).

Choral works:

- New Year's Eve
- Salve Caput Cruentatum (1925)
- O Gloriosa Domina (1925)
- Natural Magic
- Joll's Credo (1934).

Source: Grove Dictionary of Music and Musicians

== Writing ==
In his student days at the Royal College of Music, Hart wrote verse, some of which was set to music by Gustav Holst (the unpublished operas The Revoke (1895) and The Idea (1898); partsong Light leaves whisper (1896), and children's chorus Clouds o'er the summer sky (1898)).

In Melbourne, his volume of verse Appassionata: Songs of Youth and Love was published by Lothian Press. While in Hawaii he wrote 23 novels, none of which were published.
