= Eduard Scharf (musician) =

German pianist (1857–1928)

Eduard Scharf (23 March 1857 – 23 January 1928) was a German pianist and teacher who had a long career in Australia, for many years with the Melbourne Conservatorium. He was incarcerated as an enemy alien during the latter years of World War I.

== History ==
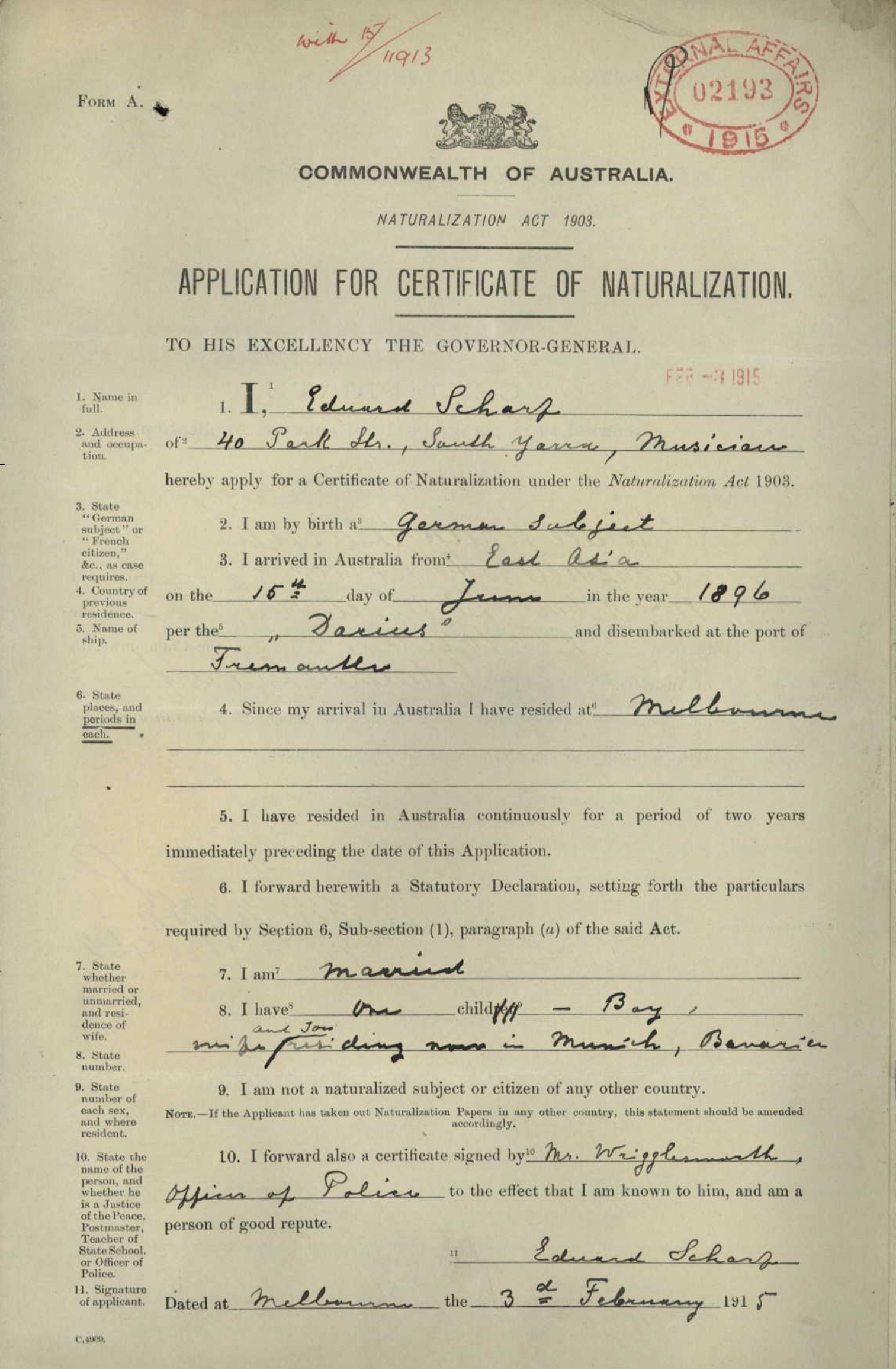
Naturalization application

Scharf was born in Ettlingen, Grand Duchy of Baden and had his first piano lessons from his father, but before embarking on further training received a thorough education at the University of Metz. He then trained as a pianist at the Leipzig Conservatorium, where his tutors included one Wenzel, Dr Carl Reinecke, and Dr Oscar Paul, and was a winner of the Moscheles prize.

Scharf arrived in Australia in 1892 as accompanist for violinist Ovide Musin, whose tour ended in July 1897.

Scharf decided to remain in the country, and found employment with the teaching staff of the Melbourne Conservatorium of Music, founded and headed by the brilliant but irascible George Marshall-Hall. (Note: In 1890, despite his youth and lack of academic qualifications, Marshall-Hall was appointed to the Ormond Chair of Music. Highly successful but divisive, he was suspended following publication of his Hymns Ancient and Modern, a book of non-religious verse, not the venerable Anglican hymnal. Following a campaign by the Melbourne Argus and a barrage of protests from Establishment Church interests, the University Council refused Marshall-Hall's reappointment in 1900, offering it (after Marshall-Hall's name had been secretly removed from the list of applicants) to Franklin Peterson. Marshall-Hall continued running the music school on Albert Street as a private concern, the "Marshall-Hall Conservatorium". Peterson died in 1914 and Marshall-Hall was re-appointed amid controversy.) Marshall-Hall died in 1915.)

In 1897, during Marshall-Hall's long illness, Scharf was deputed by the University Council to take on certain of his duties, including conducting the Conservatorium Orchestra, while W. A. Laver acted as director. Marshall-Hall attempted to have Scharf and August Siede appointed to staff but was rebuffed — it was university policy that their employment should be conditional on student fees. A few months later Marshall-Hall prevailed, and Scharf was appointed teacher of pianoforte. This promotion, instituted by Marshall-Hall over a native-born candidate with more seniority, stoked the fires of hostility. When Marshall-Hall founded his own Conservatorium, Scharf was one of those (Note: Others were Elise Wiedermann, Marguerite Henderson, Ernst Hartung, Rudolf Himmer and Achille Rebottaro for singing; Nellie Billings and Adelaide Burkitt for pianoforte; Franz Dierich and Alberto Zelman for violin; John W. Dawson for violin and viola; Louis Hattenbach for cello; and August Siede for organ) who followed him. Marshall-Hall departed for England in early 1913, leaving Scharf as acting director, but by year's end he had accepted a position with the University Conservatorium.

In December 1915 the University Council voted (by 8 to 3) not to reappoint Scharf on account of his German origin. Arguments that he had an Australian wife and son, that by German law he had lost his citizenship, and that he had attempted naturalization, were lost to Dr Leeper's contention that the University should not be seen as soft on Germans, even one so hard to replace. Professor Masson was a notable dissident.

Sometime after July 1917 Scharf was consigned to the Alien Internment Camp outside Sydney. His return to Germany was not mentioned in the Australian press. He died in Munich shortly before his 70th birthday.

== Students ==
Among Scharf's students who went on to careers in music were:

- William Murdoch
- Frederick Mewton
- Max Pirani, examiner

== Personal ==
Scharf was engaged to a Clara Llewellyn, a piano student in 1897, but married the pianist Olive de Hugard shortly after August 1898 . They lived in Jolimont and had a son Theodore on 15 June 1899. His wife and son left for Munich in 1914 to further his education in art, and she became a journalist.

He died in Munich on 23 January 1928.
