= Bernard Heinze =

Australian conductor (1894–1982)

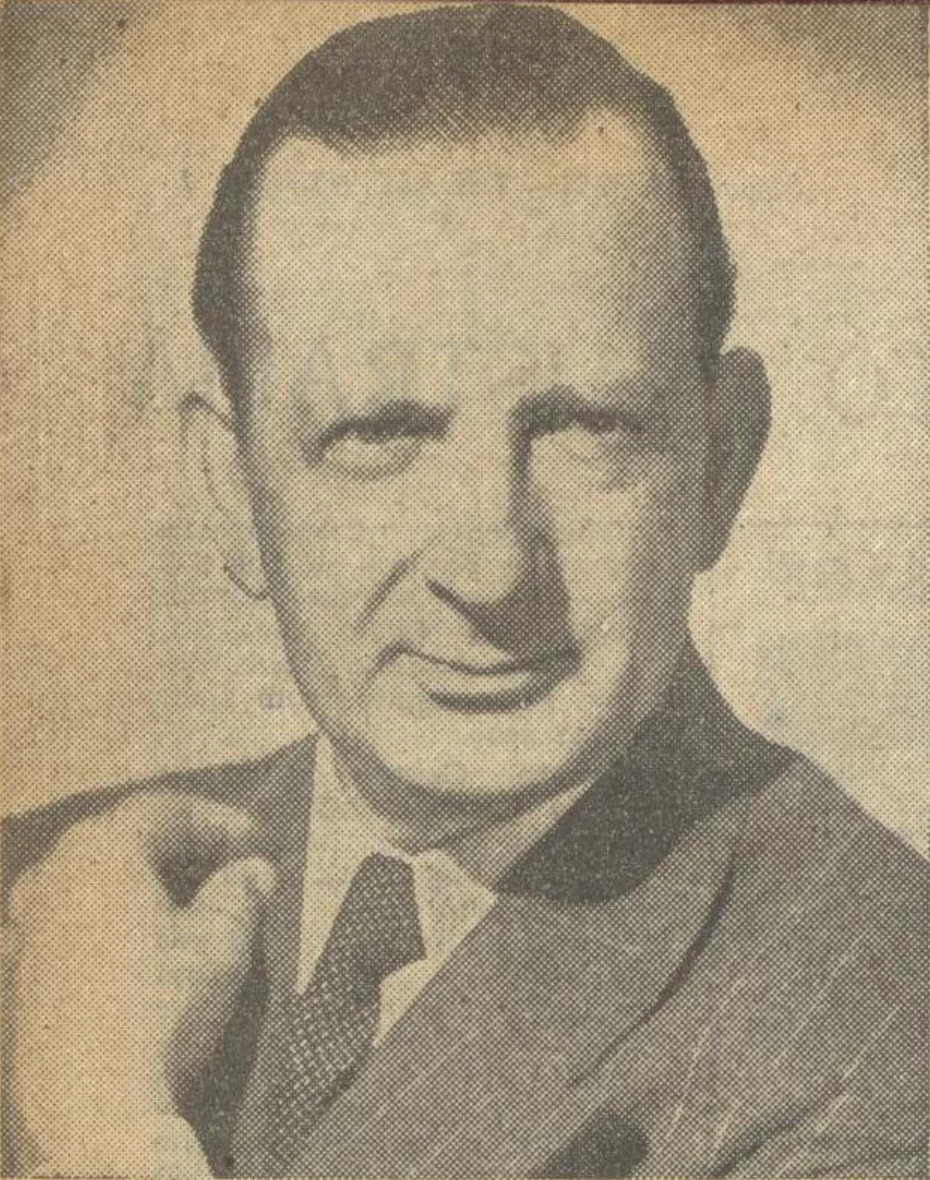
Sir Bernard Heinze, 1954

Sir Bernard Thomas Heinze, AC, FRCM (1 July 1894 – 10 June 1982) was an Australian conductor, academic, and Director of the New South Wales State Conservatorium of Music.

He conducted all the orchestras run by the ABC, most particularly the Melbourne Symphony Orchestra, of which he was chief conductor from 1933 to 1950. Also, he was chief conductor of the Royal Melbourne Philharmonic from 1927, becoming Honorary Life Conductor in the 1960s, and continuing his association with the RMP until 1978.

In addition he was guest conductor of the Adelaide Symphony Orchestra in 1939. Discouraged by Australian audiences' lack of interest in music, he founded Children's Concerts. He also initiated the Young Performers Awards, which continue to showcase emerging international talent.

He introduced Australian audiences to the works of Anton Bruckner, Dmitri Shostakovich, Béla Bartók and William Walton, and promoted Australian composers. In 1949 he became the first Australian ever to be knighted for services to music. Through teaching and performance, not least via broadcasting, he played a central role in his country's artistic activities. In his later years he was, quite simply, the most influential single man in Australian music, one critic having declared: 'there is not a fibre of our musical life that has not been modified by his career.'

== Biography ==
Bernard Heinze was born in Shepparton, Victoria on 1 July 1894, the son of Benjamin Heinze, a German-born watch-maker and jeweller, and his Yorkshire-born wife, Minnie Heinze, née Greenwell. Educated at St Patrick's Catholic College, Ballarat, Heinze received violin lessons at an early age, under the guidance of Walter Gude (1904–12) first in Ballarat, and later at the University of Melbourne under Franklin Peterson, before being awarded the (Sir William) Clarke Scholarship at the Royal College of Music in London (1913).

World War I interrupted Heinze's studies and his career was put on hold; he received a commission in May 1916 with the British Royal Garrison Artillery Special Reserve Regiment and fought at Arras, Ypres, the Somme and Passchendaele.

With the advent of peace, Heinze studied in Paris at the Schola Cantorum, under Vincent d'Indy. He returned home in 1923. When only 32 years old, he succeeded William Laver as Ormond Professor of Music at the University of Melbourne. He held this professorship till 1957, and played a crucial role in the creation of the Faculty of Music. Thus he influenced governmental education policy for the successful introduction of music to the state curriculum.

One of Heinze's great achievements came with the advent of wireless radio. As director-general of music with the new National Broadcasting Service at 3LO-3AR (forerunner to the ABC), he was able to inspire a generation of Australians to the love of orchestral music that was until then largely a luxury confined to the upper classes.

Heinze envisaged a central professional full-time orchestra in Melbourne. After Alberto Zelman's death in 1927, he was offered the conductorship of the Melbourne Philharmonic Society (later the Royal Melbourne Philharmonic); many of the players of the RMP's orchestra also played in Fritz Hart's Melbourne Symphony Orchestra. This led to the loss of the RMP Orchestra's separate identity. From 1932 to 1937, Heinze was co-chief conductor of the MSO with Hart, and sole chief conductor until 1950. The MSO was renamed the Victorian Symphony Orchestra in 1949, reverting to its original name in 1964.

In 1929 Heinze was appointed music adviser to the Australian Broadcasting Commission. There he oversaw the inception of its State orchestras, celebrity concerts, youth concerts and fine music broadcasting.

His last appointment of significance was as director of the New South Wales State Conservatorium of Music (1956–66) succeeding Sir Eugene Goossens, who had resigned in scandal. After leaving the directorship in 1966, Heinze continued to conduct the main Australian orchestras on a regular basis until the late 1970s. He also conducted overseas orchestras: on 14 January 1947, he was the conductor of the Toronto Symphony Orchestra in the professional concerto debut of the 14-year-old Glenn Gould, who played Beethoven's Piano Concerto No. 4.

He died on 10 June 1982, aged 87, in Bellevue Hill, Sydney, survived by his wife Valerie née Hennessy.

== Honours ==
Bernard Heinze became a Fellow of the Royal College of Music in 1931.

He was knighted in 1949, the first Australian musician to receive this honour.

Sir Bernard was named the 1974 Australian of the Year.

On Australia Day 1976, he was appointed a Companion of the Order of Australia for his services to Australian music.

== Sir Bernard Heinze Memorial Award ==
The Sir Bernard Heinze Memorial Award was inaugurated following the death of Sir Bernard Heinze in 1982, and is given annually to a person who has made an outstanding contribution to music in Australia.

== Sources ==
- ABC: Dimension in Time
- Brighton Cemetery
