= Alberto Zelman =

Australian musician and conductor

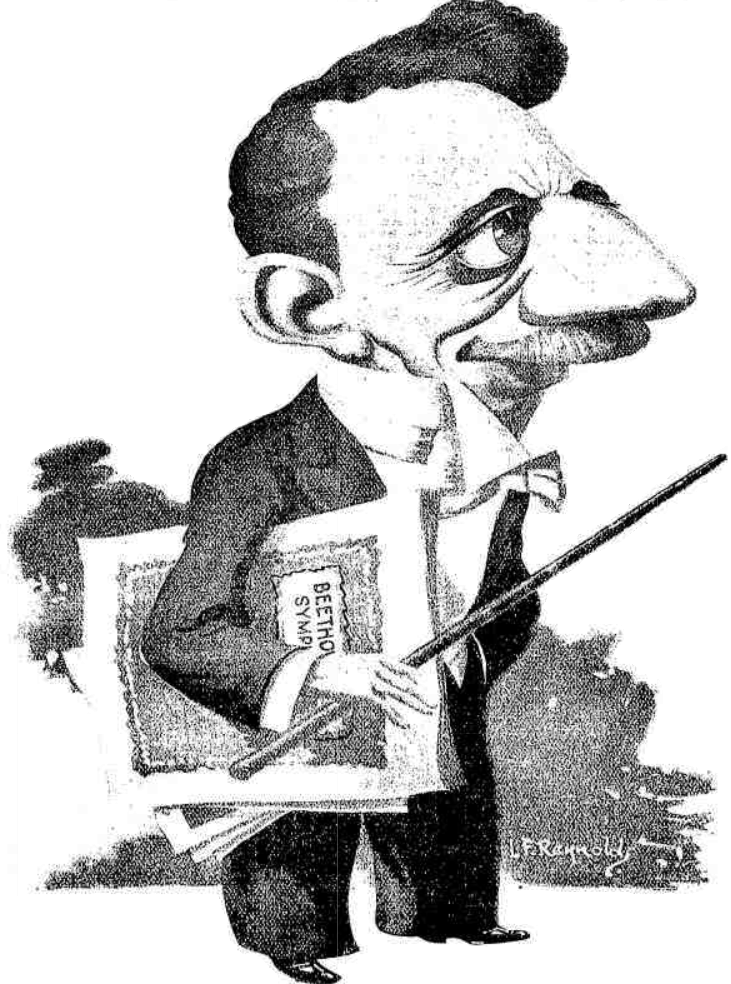
1926 caricature by Reynolds

(Samuel Victor Albert) Alberto Zelman (15 November 1874 – 3 March 1927) was an Australian musician and conductor, and founder of one of the predecessors to the Melbourne Symphony Orchestra.

== Life and career ==
Alberto Zelman was born in Melbourne, Australia. His father, Alberto Zelman (senior), had come from Trieste via India as conductor of an opera company, and settled in Melbourne.

Zelman was educated at King's College, Melbourne. After the death of George Marshall-Hall he founded (in 1906) and conducted the Albert Street Conservatorium Orchestra which, in 1927, combined with the Melbourne University Symphony Orchestra to form the Melbourne Symphony Orchestra (MSO). The MUSO was mainly amateur with a core of professional players, and Alberto conducted it over the years, giving many memorable performances.

Alberto Zelman was also well known in the Spa Country region of Victoria, and he lived for a short period in a cottage on 7th Street in Hepburn Springs that stands today and which features a frieze of the local bush painted by his artist brother Victor.

His last appearance was to conduct Messiah on Christmas night 1926; such world-famous singers as John McCormack and Dame Clara Butt had been soloists in his Messiah.

He died in Melbourne on 3 March 1927.

The MSO continued to perform after his death until 1932 when it was taken over jointly by Professor (later Sir) Bernard Heinze and Fritz Hart, who converted it to an all-professional orchestra. In 1933 the amateur players formed their own orchestra, naming it the Zelman Memorial Symphony Orchestra after Alberto Zelman. It has given at least three concerts each year since that time and now, more than 80 years later, the Zelman Symphony continues to perform with at least four concerts each year in Melbourne and one or more in country Victoria. The Zelman Symphony owns Alberto Zelman Jnr's Mustel celeste (celesta), circa 1890.

== Works ==
- (Contributor) Fortunatus and the magic purse and wishing cap, or, Little King Pippin: grand operatic Christmas pantomime.
- 1866 Waltes on the Pipele Opera themes
- 1905 Ave Maria in B Flat
- 1910 Elegie
- Crispino waltzes
- Ariel valse
- 1900 Gavotte
- Sérénade Andalouse
- The Bernhardt valse
- La juive quadrilles
- O salutaris : a motett
- 1877 Emelie polka
- Gloria tibi domine
