= George Marshall-Hall =

Australian composer, conductor and poet

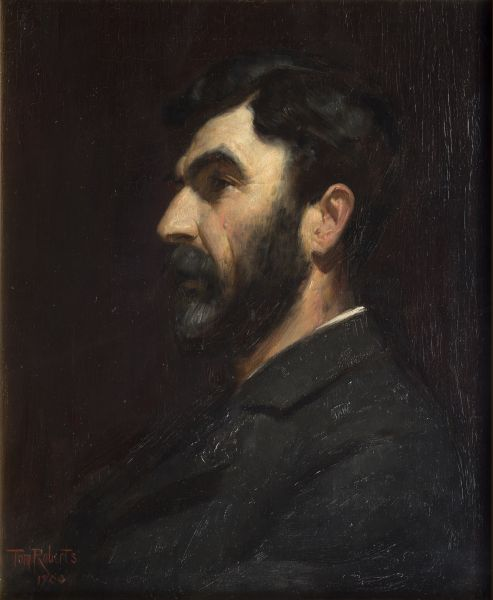
George Marshall-Hall in 1900

George William Louis Marshall-Hall (28 March 1862 – 18 July 1915) was an English-born musician, composer, conductor, poet and controversialist who lived and worked in Australia from 1891 till his death in 1915. According to his birth certificate, his surname was 'Hall' and 'Marshall' was his fourth given name, which commemorated his physiologist grandfather, Marshall Hall (1790–1857). George's father, a barrister – who, however, never practised that profession – appears to have been the first to hyphenate the name and his sons followed suit.

== Family ==
Marshall-Hall was born on 28 March 1862 in London and died on 18 July 1915 in Fitzroy, Victoria. On 5 April 1884, he married May Hunt at St Matthew's Church, Bayswater, London. She died in 1901. On 6 March 1902, in Melbourne, Marshall-Hall married Kathleen Hoare, who for some time had been passed as his wife. George Marshall-Hall and May Marshall-Hall (née Hunt)'s daughter Elsa Mary Marshall-Hall was born on 17 August 1891. She married John Thomas Inman in Traralgon on 17 August 1917. She was a teacher at a number of Victorian country schools. She also taught piano and, like her father, she was a composer. 29 of her works have been preserved, many at the Grainger Museum at the University of Melbourne. Elsa Marshall-Hall died in 1980, and is buried at Brighton Cemetery, where her father was also buried.

== Early life ==
Marshall-Hall's father owned a 65-ton iron ocean-going yacht which, he said, was kept "in great measure to give my family fresh air, the opportunity of seeing foreign ports, of leading a healthy life such as cannot be led on shore". He was, he declared, a "family yachtsman who likes to see his youngsters' skin-tanned". As a child George probably participated in family trips on this vessel when it explored Norwegian fjords and grappled for broken telegraph cable in the Atlantic Ocean.

Born in London, Marshall-Hall began his schooling in Brighton. But then his family moved to Blackheath in London's southeast where in 1873 he enrolled in the Blackheath Proprietary School and at much the same time began taking private music lessons. His interest in music, according to his brother, had first been aroused by his paternal grandmother and his great-uncle. The latter, it seems, was himself an organist and composer. In 1878 the family moved again, this time to Montreux on the shore of Lake Geneva in Switzerland, where George formed a choral society which met to practise in the family dining room.

By 1880, having become proficient in both French and German, he was back in England teaching languages and music, first at the Oxford Military College, Cowley, and afterwards at Newton Abbot Proprietary College, South Devon. Then, late in 1886, bent now on devoting himself to a career in music, he returned briefly to Switzerland to take up a position as organist in Lausanne before becoming musical director of Wellington College in Crowthorne, Berkshire. In 1888 he was appointed orchestral and choral conductor as well as composition- and singing-teacher at the London Organ School and Instrumental College of Music. At the same time articles written by him on musical subjects began appearing in English newspapers and magazines.

He was later to claim that his father disapproved of his choice of career, declaring that "he wouldn't want any damn fiddler in his family" and, when thwarted in this regard, cutting his son off without a shilling. So George apparently received no paternal assistance when, unable to get enough work in his chosen profession on occasions in the 1880s, he was compelled, he recalled, to sleep in the snow in Trafalgar Square and to button his jacket up to the neck when in polite society to conceal his lack of a shirt collar and waistcoat.

His fortunes took a turn for the better in 1890 when he was appointed as foundation Ormond Professor of Music to head the newly created Melbourne Conservatorium of Music at the University of Melbourne. He had few formal qualifications for the position. In 1883 he had enrolled at the Royal College of Music in London but left after only a single term, having, according to a friend, become "impatient with the college's slow ways and slower Professors". This was the sum total of his tertiary education in music. His only other relevant achievement apart from his freelance music journalism had been a February 1888 performance by the London Symphony Orchestra of an excerpt from his opera Harold. The appointment of Australian university professors at that time was usually based on recommendations from expert committees set up for the purpose in London. The deficiency of Marshall-Hall's formal qualifications for the Melbourne chair is reflected in the fact that, although he was one of 48 applicants when the post was first advertised in March 1888, the London committee declined to make a recommendation. One member, the Professor of Music at the University of Oxford, Frederick Ouseley, conceded that there were "some eminently respectable men, and good musicians in the ordinary sense of the words" among the applicants, adding however that there were "certainly not five – hardly one – of whom I could honestly speak as first-class ... The best men have not become candidates." Certainly two other committee members, principal of the Royal Academy of Music Alexander Mackenzie and concert pianist Sir Charles Hallé, while echoing Ouseley's view, agreed that Marshall-Hall was the only candidate who was "near to the mark". But when later that year the job was re-advertised, Marshall-Hall was still not considered the most suitable applicant by the committee, which selected four names, including his, to send to the Council of the University of Melbourne, but declined to rank them. The impasse was broken in 1890 when the Council obtained private advice from Hallé (then on a concert tour of Australia) and (indirectly) from Mackenzie and the Director of the Royal College of Music, Sir George Grove, all of whom recommended the appointment of Marshall-Hall.

== Musical contributions in Australia ==
As an extrovert, Marshall-Hall prized "constant activity ... constant striving" that absorbs one's "whole energy", arousing "a condition of ... superabundant life" and enabling one to partake "to the utmost of the joy of living". And this outlook was reflected in the way he lived his life. Contemporaries remarked on his loud laughter and his habit of humming operatic airs as he strode around town, of tapping his baton importunately on the podium and glaring at restive concert audiences to achieve silence when conducting, and of writing explosive comments – such as "O superfine Assiduity" and "monstrous ignorance" – in the margins of books he read, by way of showing his contempt for the writer.

This same insatiable energy governed his musical activities in Melbourne, where he arrived to take up his new position at the beginning of 1891. During the following quarter of a century he was to exercise a wide-ranging and deep influence on music education, appreciation and performance in his new home. He soon showed that he would not be satisfied with simply presiding over the university's new music department with its degree and diploma courses. The former was focused on composition, the latter on performance, but there was little sustained demand for either. In the whole of the first decade of the chair's existence only three students obtained a degree in music and twenty-three acquired a diploma. Moreover, Marshall-Hall complained that he had no control over the practical work of diploma students, as apart from himself the university employed no music staff, which meant that students had to take private lessons from teachers of their choice in the external community. To overcome this problem and increase enrolments Marshall-Hall called for the establishment of a university conservatorium, and on 19 July 1894, legislation was passed to create the first conservatorium in the British Empire within a university. With the professor as ex-officio director it opened for business in 1895, renting premises initially in the unfinished Queen's Coffee Palace on the corner of Rathdowne and Victoria streets, Carlton, but moving soon afterwards to the ground-floor of the Victorian Artists' Society building in East Melbourne. From the beginning enrolments boomed.

In the meantime, George Marshall-Hall was also making his mark on the broader musical community outside the university. He established a largely professional orchestra which, after an initial public performance toward the end of 1891, began in the following year to give an annual series of concerts, mostly on Saturday afternoons under the professor's conductorship in the Melbourne Town Hall. When the last one had been performed in 1911, a total of 111 such concerts had been given – an average of more than five a year. In addition, from 1897 to 1902 he acted as honorary conductor of the Melbourne Liedertafel, a male choir. And all the time he continued to compose music, including a concert overture in G minor, an Idyll, a symphony in E-flat, incidental music for a performance of Euripides' Alcestis, a string quartet in D minor, a dramatic ballad based on Keats' La Belle Dame sans Merci, a study on Tennyson's "Maud", a Capriccio for violin and orchestra, a choral ode, a music drama called Aristodemus and two operas. Most of these works were performed in Melbourne under his direction.

== Controversialist ==
He also found time to publish numerous newspaper articles, four books of verse and a play called Bianca Capello, as well as delivering many passionate and provocative speeches in the concert-hall and elsewhere which were widely reported in the press.

Among other things, he preached a whole-hearted, sensuous enjoyment of living, extolling "the mighty immutable goddess of laughter and love" and "the splendour and vigour of ... immanent, multiplied, voluptuous vitality". He encouraged his fellows "to taste life to the full" by throwing themselves with "extreme exuberance" into its "manifold sensations", allowing its joys to "pulse in the passionate blood and burst through the brain" until "body and mind quiver and bound as though interpenetrated by an instantaneous current of electric fluid". This won him friends and admirers in Melbourne's bohemian community, including such well-known artists as Arthur Streeton (with whom he shared digs for a time in St Kilda), Tom Roberts and Lionel and Norman Lindsay, who reacted favourably to his convivial exhortations to come "Be merry while we may" in the enjoyment of "the glorious ardours of the genial bowl". No doubt they also welcomed his pronouncements on the superiority of artists over ordinary mortals.

But his abrasive personality gained him enemies, too. Former Victorian Lieutenant-Governor Sir William Robinson's 1890 warning to Melbourne University council that Marshall-Hall exhibited "a certain outspoken roughness in his manner" was something of an understatement. On taking up his new post in the following year, he was clearly intent on rousing his fellow citizens out of what he saw as their smug philistinism. He denounced local musical performances as "execrable" and deplored the vacuousness of Melbourne's concert-goers who, he declared, had "no taste ... and are profoundly ignorant of what music is". He proclaimed the city's music teachers to be "frightfully bad" and when private school principals grumbled about the high failure-rate in the matriculation music examination for which he was responsible, he retorted that it was fortunate that "our schools are the last places in the world to which our youth turn for light and understanding, otherwise they would grow up mentally akin to those monstrosities which I remember with dim horror upon the tables of boarding-houses and which go by the name of resurrection pies." And he complained rancorously about the "frivolous incapable buffooneries", "vicious emanations" and "sterile, unproductive mediocrity" of local music critics. People who disagreed with his literary judgements were also in danger of feeling his sharp tongue. At a Town Hall concert on 24 July 1893, he took time off from conducting to inform the audience that a recent article in The Argus condemning the "putrid ... mass of ... sensuality" in the plays of Henrik Ibsen was the "shameless and ignorant" work of a "scurrilous newspaper hack".

== Melbourne University ==
In 1890, despite his youth and lack of academic qualifications, Marshall-Hall was appointed to the Ormond Chair of Music at the University of Melbourne.

In 1894 he founded the Melbourne Conservatorium of Music as an adjunct to the Music Department, leasing rooms in the six-storey Queen's Coffee Palace, at the corner of Rathdowne and Victoria streets, Carlton. By the end of the year 1900, the teaching staff had grown to 24, and the students' concerts at the Town Hall and Her Majesty's Theatre were popular.

He published a book of verse cheekily titled Hymns Ancient and Modern, devoted to his love of art and life, free from cant and religion. Following a campaign by the Melbourne Argus and a barrage of protests from Church interests, the University Council refused Marshall-Hall's reappointment in 1900, but allowed him to submit his name as a candidate to the selection panel in London. The Agent-General in London removed his name before handing the list over, but made no mention of the fact. Franklin Peterson was appointed to the chair.

Marshall-Hall continued running the music school on Albert Street as a private concern, the "Marshall-Hall Conservatorium", taking much of the staff and students with him. The school achieved a high reputation and exhibited considerable loyalty to its founder. When Marshall-Hall had a long period of illness in 1897, Eduard Scharf acted in his place. In February 1913 Marshall-Hall left for London to oversee production of his operas Stella and Juliet (or Romeo and Juliet), and again Scharf acted as director. By the year's end however, Marshall-Hall had announced he would not return and Scharf had accepted a teaching position with the University Conservatorium.

Peterson died in 1914 and Marshall-Hall was appointed to the Ormond Chair despite the views of Rev. Dr Sugden and the strenuous opposition of Dr Leeper. He saw Stella performed on stage in London, and Juliet was published, but its performance postponed, perhaps permanently, by the outbreak of war. Marshall-Hall, on his return broached the subject of amalgamation, but the new director of the Albert Street Conservatorium, Fritz Hart, was not amenable. He set about modernizing the University Conservatorium, bringing in Otto Fisher Sobell for voice production.

It was not to last. He contracted appendicitis, requiring urgent surgery. Marshall-Hall died at St Evin's hospital at 10 pm on 9 July 1915.

== Legacy ==
A symphony by him was played at the Queen's Hall, London, in 1907 conducted by Sir Henry Wood. Though somewhat influenced by the work of Wagner, Brahms and Puccini, George Marshall-Hall's compositions display pronounced individuality and sincerity. It was nevertheless as a teacher, enthusiastic and free from pedantry, and as an inspiring orchestral conductor that he did his most important work, and the value of his influence on the musical life of Melbourne can hardly be overstated. Marshall-Hall was tall, dark, witty, humorous and intolerant of pretence.

== Works ==
- 1886 Die Blumen, sextet for voice, two violins, viola, cello and double bass
- 1880s Harold, opera in four acts to a libretto by the composer based on Edward Bulwer-Lytton's historical novel, Harold: The Last of the Saxon Kings (1848); first Performance 1888
- 1891 Giordano Bruno (dedicated to Arthur Streeton)
- 1894 Idyll
- 1894 La Belle Dame sans Merci for violin and orchestra
- 1898 Alcestis, incidental music to the play by Euripides
- 1898 "Choral Ode", a setting of the second part of Goethe's Faust for alto soloist, orchestra and mixed choir
- 1899 "Australian National Song" for chorus (SATB) and piano
- 1900 A Song Cycle of Life and Love
- 1902 Aristodemus, opera in 25 scenes
- 1903 Symphony in E-flat recorded
- 1906 Bianco Capello: A Tragedy
- 1907 Two Violin Fantasies
- 1909 Quartet in B Major for horn, violin, viola and piano; ABC Classics recording
- 1910 Caprice for violin and orchestra
- 1910 Stella, one-act opera
- 1912 Romeo and Juliet, opera
- Jubilum Amoris
- Book of Canticles
- Hymns Ancient and Modern
- Phantasy for Horn and Orchestra
