= Buma =

Buma can mean:

- a Dutch surname:
  - Anita Buma (1958), a Dutch Antarctic researcher
  - Bernhard van Haersma Buma (1932-2020), Dutch politician and mayor.
  - Jaap-Derk Buma (1972), a Dutch field hockey player
  - Jonathan Buma (born 19..), US-American FBI-agent
  - Sybrand van Haersma Buma (1965), a CDA politician and member of parliament since 2002
  - Wybren Jan Buma (1910-1999), a Dutch scholar of Frisian languages and history
- A pumping station of the Noordoostpolder in the Netherlands, named after a politician involved in the planning of the Zuiderzee works
- Kufra Airport in Libya, which was referred to as "Buma" during World War II
- Buma/Stemra, a Dutch copyright organization that oversees distribution of royalties among publishers, musicians, and writers
- Buma, another name for the language better called Teanu (Solomon Islands)
