= Pore Caitif =

Start of the Pore Caitif in Anglais 41

The Pore Caitif is a didactic Christian religious treatise written in Middle English in the 1390s. The goal of the author—the 'poor wretch' of the title—is to impart to his readers the truths necessary for salvation. The text is associated with the rise of the Lollards in England, although it does not necessarily espouse Lollard theology.

== Manuscripts ==
Fifty-seven manuscripts of the Pore Caitif have been identified, of which 54 are extant. Only 30 of these copies are full texts. The earliest manuscripts are three that are nearly contemporary with the work: New York, Public library, MS De Ricci 68; Paris, Bibliothèque Nationale de France, MS Anglais 41; and Oxford, Bodleian Library, MS Douce 13. Several manuscripts contain alterations and interpolations to bring the text into line with the theology of John Wycliffe. These seven "heterodox" manuscripts are known as the Lollard group and include Anglais 41.

== Content ==
The Pore Caitif consists of a prologue and fourteen tracts. The rubrics (titles) of the tracts vary in the manuscripts but they usually begin with a decorated initial. Certain manuscripts, the "free products of individual scribes who felt no obligation to exact transmission", rearrange the tracts (thus contradicting the prologue), but the text itself "did not undergo rewritings, expansions or shortenings". The tracts are:

1. Credo
2. On the Ten Commandments
3. On the Lord's Prayer
4. The Counsel of Christ
5. Of Virtuous Patience
6. Of Temptation
7. The Charter of Heaven
8. The Horse or the Armour of Heaven
9. Love of Jesus
10. Desire of Jesus
11. Of Meekness
12. The Effect of Will
13. Active Life and Contemplative Life
14. On the Mirror of Chastity

The first three tracts on the Apostles' Creed, Ten Commandments and Lord's Prayer take up over two thirds of the entire work. The single longest tract is that on the commandments, which has its own prologue and epilogue, entitled "The Charge of the Heestis".

== Sources ==
Many of the Pore Caitif's sources have been identified. He quotes from Gregory the Great's Homily 40 on Ezekiel, Homily 40 on the Gospels and Commentary on Job; from Bede's Commentary on Luke; the Decretals of Gregory IX; the Pseudo-Augustinian De symbolo; and the writings of Anselm of Aosta and Hugh of Saint Victor.

Middle English sources are used extensively, including the Ancrene Riwle, the Chastising of God's Children, the Charter of Christ, Dives et Pauper, the Prik of Conscience, Speculum Christiani and John Gaytryge's Lay Folks' Catechism. Somme le roi by Laurent d'Orléans was used in its English translation, Book of Vices and Virtues, as was Paulinus of Aquileia's De salutaribus documentis, although misattributed to Augustine. Especially popular were the works of Richard Rolle, such as his Emendatio vitae, Quandoque tribularis vel temptaris, Oleum effusum, Fire of Love, Encomium Nominis Iesu and Form of Living. Also used was the Abbey of the Holy Ghost by a disciple of Rolle, the Digby plays and some poems found in the Vernon Manuscript.

== Bibliography ==
- Brady, Mary Teresa (1954). "The Pore Caitif: An Introductory Study". Traditio. 10: 529–548.
- Brady, Mary Teresa (1988). "The Lollard Sources of 'The Pore Caitif'". Traditio. 44: 389–418.
- Moreau-Guibert, Karine, ed. (2019). Pore Caitif: A Middle English Manual of Religion and Devotion. Brepols.
- Penkett, Luke (2024). The Poor Caitif: A Modern English Translation with Introductory Essays and Notes. Brepols.
