= Fifteen Signs before Doomsday =

Beliefs of events before doomsday

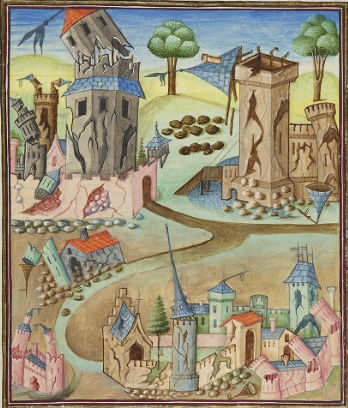
Illumination from the fifteenth-century Livre de la Vigne nostre Seigneur showing the sixth of the fifteen signs according to the Golden Legend: "All cities will collapse and all that is built, and fiery bolts of lightning will appear from sundown to sunrise".

The Fifteen Signs before Doomsday (alternatively known as the Fifteen Signs of Doomsday, Fifteen Signs before Judgement, in Latin Quindecim Signa ante Judicium, and in German 15 Vorzeichen des Jüngsten Gerichts) is a list, popular in the Middle Ages because of millenarianism, of the events that are supposed to occur in the fortnight before the end of the world. It may find an origin in the apocryphal Apocalypse of Thomas and is found in many post-millennial manuscripts in Latin and in the vernacular. References to it occur in a great multitude and variety of literary works, and via the Cursor Mundi it may have found its way even into the early modern period, in the works of William Shakespeare.

== Origin ==
The Fifteen Signs derives from the Apocalypse of Thomas, an apocryphal apocalyptic text composed in Greek (and subsequently translated in Latin) between the second and fourth century. It exists in two versions, the second, longer one treating fifth-century events as contemporary. The first version includes a list of seven signs announcing the end of the world. The longer version, however, has an appended section which brings the list of signs up to fifteen. This version was taken up and reshaped by the Irish, after which it became a source for many European visions of the "end of days".

== Remaining versions ==
One of its many versions can be found in the Asega-bôk. Another version can be found in the Saltair na Rann. One of the earliest versions is De quindecim signis (PL XCIV.555) written in the 8th century by Pseudo-Bede.

=== Manuscripts ===
- Corpus Christi College, Oxford MS 36 (fragment, 125 verses in French in octosyllabic rhyming couplets)
- Bodleian Library, Oxford MS. Douce 134 (Livre de la Vigne nostre Seigneur, with miniatures of all fifteen signs): fully digitized
- Kildare Poems (British Library Harley MS 913) contains a version in Middle English.

== Types ==
The Fifteen Signs are organized in three general types: the Voragine type, the Pseudo-Bede type, and the Comestor type. The Welsh prose versions edited by William Heist are each based on any of the three; the Asega-bôk is based on both Pseudo-Bede and Comestor's Historia scholastica.

=== Signs ===
The fifteen signs are shown over fifteen days, though in many different varieties. According to the Welsh prose version:

1. The earth's waters rise above the mountains
2. The waters sink so low they cannot be seen anymore
3. The waters return to their original position
4. All sea animals gather on the surface and bellow unintelligibly
5. The waters burn from east to west
6. Plants and trees fill with dew and blood
7. Earth is divided into two parts
8. All buildings are destroyed
9. The stones fight each other
10. Great earthquakes occur
11. All mountains and valleys are leveled to a plain
12. Men come out from their hiding places but can no longer understand each other
13. The stars and constellations fall out of the sky (in the Comestor variant only stars fall)
14. The bones of the dead come out of their graves
15. All men die, the earth burns with water
16. Judgment Day

In the Middle English version of the Kildare Poems:

1. The stars shall be thrown down to earth
2. The dead will rise and sit upon their tombs
3. The sun will turn black
4. The sun will turn red
5. Every beast will tremble and look to heaven
6. The mountains will fall and fill up the valleys, castles, towers and trees will fall
7. Trees will grow upside down, with their roots above ground; they will bleed
8. The sea will draw together to stand upright like a wall, and then return to its place
9. A voice will speak from the sky, begging God for mercy
10. The angels will tremble and the demons will lament
11. Four winds will rise and then the rain bow will fall, driving the demons back to Hell
12. The four elements will cry in strong voice: "Mercy, Jesus, son of Mary, as you are God and King of heaven!" (Merci Iesus, fiȝ Mari, As þou ert god and king of heuene)

The poem breaks off at this point, leaving the final signs unknown.

== Influence ==
References to the fifteen signs are ubiquitous in medieval Western literature. In the fifteenth century, prints detailing the life of the Antichrist usually included the fifteen signs. An Anglo-Norman version was included in the fourteenth-century Cursor Mundi, and C. H. Conley argued that William Shakespeare used a reading knowledge of that poem or one like it for various details in Act 1 of Hamlet and Act 2 of Julius Caesar, details he couldn't have found in Holinshed's Chronicles. Harry Morris contends that those details could have come to Shakespeare via John Daye's A Book of Christian Prayer (1578) or the Holkham Bible (14th century). The signs also occur in the shearmen's Prophets of Antichrist, part of the fifteenth-century Chester Mystery Plays.

== See also ==
- Kildare Poems
- Prick of Conscience
