= Asega-bôk =

Medieval Frisian legal manuscript

The Asega-bôk ('Book of the Judges') was part of the legal code for the Rustringian Frisians. The oldest known manuscript version, the First Riustring Manuscript (now in Oldenburg) is, besides the oldest extant text in Frisian, one of the oldest remaining continental codes of Germanic law.

== History and background ==
A codex containing a copy of the code, the First Riustring Manuscript, survives in the archives at Oldenburg (24, 1, Ab. 1). While Joseph Bosworth believed it to have been written somewhere between 1212 and 1250 A.D., twentieth-century scholars date it ca. 1300, although some of the materials that it incorporates date to 1050. That version is the oldest surviving work written in Old Frisian, and one of the oldest surviving continental Germanic law codes (the Gulating law, possibly ca. 1150, may be older). The first modern scholarly edition was published in 1961 by Wybren Jan Buma (Buma 1961) in Dutch; a year later Buma, in cooperation with Germanic law scholar Wilhelm Ebel, published an edition and translation in German (Buma 1963).

The term asega by itself is translated as 'lawspeaker', and refers to the Germanic tradition of having an orator recite law (which did not have to be written) in assembly, a practice attested in the Scandinavian Gutalagen.

== Contents ==
One part of the book is the Old Frisian version of the Fifteen Signs before Doomsday. Buma observed that the Asega-bôk's version has a style, compared to that of other versions, that is particularly Frisian. Although the list matches other versions, a conclusion was appended to it by its unknown author, who took multiple versions of the list as his or her source, in Buma's opinion, although relying mainly upon one. Rolf Bremmer noted that the attribution of the list to Jerome in the Asega-bôk's version was copied from Pseudo-Bede, and that the added conclusion is similar to Comestor's Historia scholastica. The deduction that it was taken from Comestor is what pushes the 20th century dating of the Asega-bôk later than Bosworth's dating, given that Comestor died in 1178.

The book comprises, in order:

- two similar, but not identical, versions of The Prologue to the Statutes and Land Laws (supporting the hypothesis, made by Buma, that the book is a compilation of prior texts from multiple sources);
- the Seven Statutes and the Twenty-Four Land Laws;
- the General Fine Register, part 1 (of 2);
- the Riustring Fine Register;
- the Wendar to the 17th Statute (Wendar meaning 'exception');
- the Elder Riustring Statutes (that are modified from the originals to include references to Charlemagne and the Frisians);
- the Younger Riustring Statutes;
- two texts that begin Thet is ac friesk riucht ('This is also Frisian law');
- the Fifteen Signs before Doomsday, already mentioned;
- the Riustring Fines Concerning Crimes Against Clergymen, part 1 (of 2);
- a list of the situations in which one is allowed to break into a church;
- the General Fine Register, part 2 (of 2);
- a second group of texts that begin Thet is ac friesk riucht;
- a list of coins and their values;
- an outline of the ecclesiastical penalties for murder of relatives;
- the Riustring Fines Concerning Crimes Against Clergymen, part 2 (of 2);
- the Fines for Desecrating Church and Churchyard; and
- the Riustring Synodal Laws.

According to Johnston, this is one of a great many Frisian legal documents which have a secondary function: the promotion of the ideology of Frisian independence. He identifies three levels of ideology represented in those texts: "(1) the glorification of the concept of law in general, (2) the assertion of the idea of a Pan-Frisian law, (3) the propagation of the idea of Frisian independence and the promotion of Frisian unity against threats from outside". The only text in the codex he deems exempt from such ideology is the Fifteen Signs before Doomsday.
