= Cursor Mundi =

Middle English religious poem

The Cursor Mundi (or ‘Over-runner of the World’) is an early 14th-century religious poem written in Northumbrian Middle English that presents an extensive retelling of the history of Christianity from the creation to the doomsday. The poem is long, composed of almost 30,000 lines, but shows considerable artistic skill. In spite of the immense mass of material with which it deals, it is well proportioned, and the narrative is lucid and easy.

The Cursor Mundi is more or less completely unknown outside of medievalist and lexicographical circles. Yet, the poem is one of the texts that provides the Oxford English Dictionary (OED) with over 1,000 new words, i.e. words that were unknown before they appeared for the first time in the Cursor Mundi. The poem has also provided over 11,000 quotations for the published Dictionary, making it the second most heavily quoted work in OED1/2 after the Bible and the fifth most quoted source altogether.

The first modern edition of the Cursor Mundi was published in six volumes by the Reverend Richard Morris between 1874 and 1892 in the Early English Text Society series.

== About the Cursor Mundi ==
The Cursor Mundi (or ‘Over-runner of the World’) is an early 14th-century religious poem written in Northumbrian Middle English that presents an extensive retelling of Christian history from the Creation to Doomsday. A number of manuscripts of the poem are extant, but none of them is the original composition attributed to an unknown author from the north of England. According to the philologist James Murray, the poem originated near Durham, about 1275–1300.

The author of the Cursor Mundi brings all his events under seven periods or "Seven ages of the world":

1. Creation to the time of Noah
2. Flood to the confusion of tongues
3. Time of Abraham to the death of Saul
4. Reign of David to the Captivity of Judah
5. Parentage of the Virgin Mary to the time of John the Baptist
6. Baptism of Jesus to the Finding of the Cross. This is called "the time of Grace".
7. Day of Doom and the state of the world after Doomsday

Special prominence is given throughout the work to the history of the Cross. This may be because St. Helena, the mother of Constantine, was reputed to have been of British birth and was exceptionally popular in England.

According to the Sarah M. Horrall, the general editor of Cursor Mundi, the poem occupies a unique place because of its length, its scope, and its author's broad and eclectic knowledge of the traditions of exegesis in his time.

== Origins and structure ==
=== Title ===
As explained by the author, because the book overruns almost all the course of the world's history, it was to be called ‘cursur o werld’ i.e. over-runner of the world, hence Cursor Mundi.

=== Authorship ===
The Cursor Mundi is not signed, and no author's name is given anywhere in the text. However, the author does reveal that he is a “pastor” and, according to the Rev. Morris (1892), was evidently a cleric “as modest as he was learned”. Heinrich Hupe's theory, that his name was John of Lindebergh, which place he identifies with Limber Magna in Lincolnshire, is based on a misreading of an insertion in one of the manuscripts by the scribe who copied it. Ralph Hanna has tentatively suggested that it might be an Augustinian text.

=== Source material ===
The Cursor Mundi was founded on the works of late 12th-century Latin writers who wrote various pseudo-histories made up of hagiographic, legendary, and biblical material. It borrows heavily from pre-existing Latin and French biblical versions with additional material drawn primarily from the Historia Scholastica.

It was translated and compiled gradually and incrementally from such sources, perhaps over a single writer's lifetime. Over the course of the 200-year period during which it was successively recopied, the text was adjusted to suit the changing circumstances in which it was being disseminated and read, losing many of the original features that mark the earliest extant texts as a work intended for oral-didactic performance.

In consideration of one particular segment of the poem (lines 12713–17082), it is virtually impossible to complete an exhaustive survey of the poet's source materials. However, several works may be cited with certainty regarding their influence upon it.

- Vulgate Bible
- Herman de Valenciennes Bible
- The Old French Cross story
- Vita Prothoplausti Ade (also known as Legende) (Note: According to Murdoch (2009), the Vita Prothoplausti Ade is the heading given to the Vita Adae et Evae on the first seven folios in MS 213.)
- Historia Scholastica Evangelica
- Le Chateau d’Amour (by Robert Grosseteste)
- Legenda Aurea

=== Structure ===
The Cursor Mundi poem consists of almost 30,000 lines. The short verse form is generally that of the eight-syllabled couplet, but when writing of the passion and death of Christ, the poet uses alternately rhyming lines of eight and six syllables. The discourse between Christ and man, which follows the account of the crucifixion, consists largely of six-lined mono-rhymed stanzas.

== Extant manuscripts ==
Sample page of 14th-century manuscript known as Noah's Ark, in 'Cursur o Werld'

A total of nine complete or fragmentary manuscripts of the poem are extant although none of them is the original composition attributed to the unknown poet:

1. (C) – Cotton MS. Vespasian A.iii in the British Library.
2. (F) – Fairfax MS. 14, Bodleian Library. West Midland version written in the late 14th century in Lancashire. Although the Fairfax manuscript contains about 6,000 lines less than the Cotton manuscript, it has also some unique additions.
3. (G) – Göttingen MS. Theol. 107, Göttingen University Library.
4. (T) – Trinity MS. R.3.8, Trinity College Library, Cambridge.
5. (E) – Edinburgh, Library of the Royal College of Physicians.
6. (H) – Heralds’ College of Arms, MS Arundel 57, British Library, London. Late 14th century consisting of Cursor Mundi and Richard of Hampole's Prick of Conscience.
7. (L) – MS. Laud Misc. 416, Bodleian Library, Oxford.
8. (B) – Bedford MS or alternatively Additional 36983, British Library, London. 15th century (1442) manuscript containing a number of devotional texts in addition to the Cursor Mundi (e.g. the Prick of Conscience, the Abbey of the Holy Ghost and the Three Kings of Cologne).
9. Additional 31042, British Library, London. Mid 15th Century manuscript copied by Robert Thornton.

== Modern editions ==
=== Northern ===
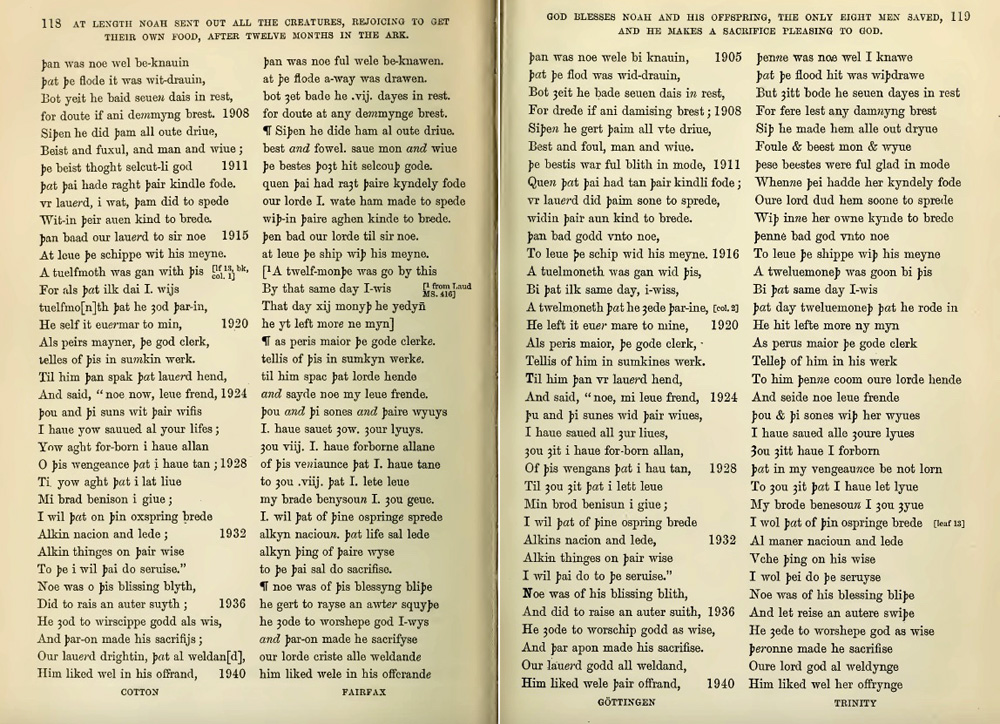
Two-page sample of Curso Mundi as transcribed by Morris (1874), showing the Cotton, Fairfax, Göttingen and Trinity manuscripts in parallel.

The first modern edition of the Cursor Mundi was published in six volumes by the Reverend Richard Morris between 1874 and 1892 under the auspices of the Early English Text Society series. Morris and his associates transcribed five manuscripts, four of which represent Northern or North Midland dialects, hence becoming known as the 'Northern' edition. Different segments of the poem were presented in volumes 1 to 5, with additional materials in volume 6.

1. 1874: Part 1, lines 1–4954
2. 1875: Part II, lines 4955–12558
3. 1876: Part III, lines 12559–19300
4. 1877: Part IV, lines 19301–23826
5. 1878: Part V, lines 23827-29527 (end).
6. 1892: Part VI, Preface, Notes, Glossary, Index of names etc.

According to Morris, publishing the four manuscripts (C, F, G and T) together meant “quadrupling the value of the text, not only as a subject for linguistic study, but also as an instance of how scribes dealt with their early originals”. Also, because the manuscripts are presented side by side (i.e. four columns across two pages, allowing a line-by-line comparison), “the four texts give an opportunity for comparison of form and word such as no other existing English book affords, except perhaps some editions of parts of the Bible”.

In addition to the four main manuscripts, the Northern edition cites most, but not all, of the other manuscripts listed above. It also cites Cotton Galba E 9, but this is not included in the manuscripts listed the Southern edition. (Note: Cotton Galba E 9 is a collection of poems including the Prick of Conscience.)

=== Southern ===
The Northern edition of the Cursor Mundi was the only one available until publication of the Southern Version of the Cursor Mundi almost a century later. The Southern edition has been described as "an attempt to tailor an older text to a changing market".

The Southern edition was published in five volumes between 1978 and 2000. (Note: The publication of Volume V was delayed due to the untimely death in 1988 of Dr Sarah Horrall, the General Editor of the Southern version. On her death Dr. Horrall left drafts of the Introduction, the Text itself, the Explanatory Notes, and Appendices C, on the Finding of the True Cross, and D, on the Legend of the Feast of the Immaculate Conception (see Eldredge and Klinck, 2000).)

1. 1978: Volume 1, lines 1–9228
2. 1990: Volume II, lines 9229–12712
3. 1985: Volume III, lines 12713–17082
4. 1986: Volume IV, lines 17289–21346
5. 2000: Volume V, lines 21845–23898

According to Horrall, a new edition of the Cursor Mundi was needed because the transcriptions in Morris' Northern version "were accompanied by a sketchy, inaccurate critical apparatus which is now out of date". In particular, Morris and his collaborators had considered the southern manuscripts (H, T, L, B) to be "hopelessly corrupt" copies of the original (C) poem. Horrall disagreed with Morris' assumptions and argued that someone in the south central Midlands came across a copy of the Cursor Mundi similar to the extant G manuscript. This copy was systematically revised and "as a result, southern England acquired not a corrupt copy of a northern poem, but a new poem, substantially changed in language and scope from its original".

== Key source of words and quotations ==
The Cursor Mundi is one of the Late Medieval texts that provides the OED with over 1,000 new words, i.e. words that were unknown before they appeared for the first time in the poem. (Note: When the OED quotes an author as its first example in an entry, that does not necessarily mean that the author made the word up or is evidence of the author's lexical creativity. Rather it tells us of the OED lexicographers’ enthusiasm for citing that particular author as a quotation source, meaning that they found first quotations in that work because they looked for such vocabulary there rather than in previously published texts. The more quotations gathered from an individual source or for a particular period, the more likely the lexicographers were to find new (i.e. previously unrecorded) words there (see Examining the OED).) Examples of the words include: anyway, anywhere, backward, blister, brimstone, chastise, chess, virginity, weakness, wickedness, willing, written, yonder, and zealot. It has also provided over 11,000 quotations for the published Dictionary, making it the second most heavily quoted work in OED1/2 after the Bible and the fifth most quoted source altogether. According to recent (2021) OED data, the figures are 1,433 words and 11,901 quotations respectively. However, the Cursi Mundi is less frequently quoted in the more recent 'OED3' because the latter relies on the Middle English Dictionary, which favours Chaucer as a quotation source.
