= Asega =

Medieval Frisian legal position

In the Old Frisian legal tradition, an asega ('legal interpreter' or 'lawspeaker') was an official legal advisor to a court of law in the Westerlauwers district (i.e., west of the River Lauwers) in western Friesland. Unlike a modern judge, the asega gave in most cases only an expert opinion on the law itself rather than on the facts of the case. As can be seen from the legal system known as Oudere Schoutenrecht, in the Old Frisian legal system with its formal approach to evidence, there was little room for appreciation of the facts of the case. Nevertheless, in exceptional circumstances, when there was a need for interpreting old sources of law in arriving at an appreciation of the case, the asega was asked for his opinion. The court could however refuse to accept his interpretation, simply arriving at its own verdict.

During the Middle Ages, the asega's role became superfluous and his function was discontinued, in most areas towards the end of the 13th century. In Friesland, the grietman assumed the duties of both schout (or prosecutor responsible for law enforcement) and asega. In Amstelland, asegas were used as part of the legal system until 1388.

According to a Frisian legend recorded in the 14th century, twelve asegas were originally given the Lex Frisionum, the written law of Friesland, by the god Fosite after Charlemagne had demanded they recite their law and they were unable to do so, having only custom. This is an indication of the close relationship of ancient Germanic law to religion.

== See also ==
- Asega-bôk
- Lawspeaker
