= Apocalypse of Thomas =

Early Christian writing

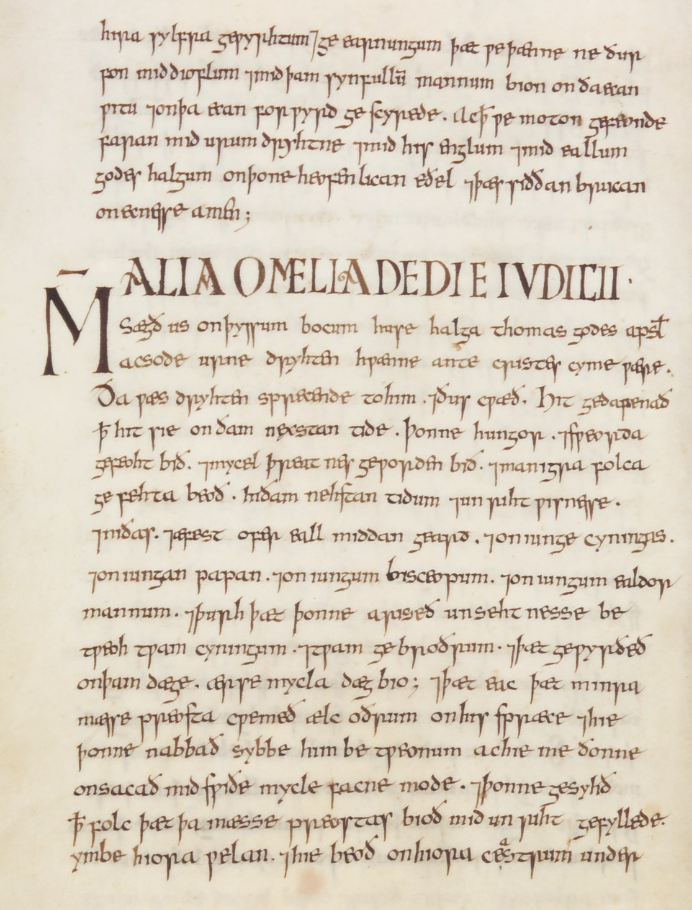
Beginning of Homily 15 in the 10th-century Vercelli Book of Old English (Anglo-Saxon) poetry, which includes content from the Apocalypse of Thomas

The Apocalypse of Thomas (Latin: Revelatio Thomae) is a work from the New Testament apocrypha. Most of the surviving witnesses are in the Latin language, but it is considered plausible that it may have been composed originally in Greek. It concerns the end of the world, and appears to be influenced by the Apocalypse of John (better known later as the Book of Revelation), although it is written in a less mystical and cosmic manner. The Apocalypse of Thomas is the inspiration for the popular medieval millennial list Fifteen Signs before Doomsday.

== Manuscript history and dating ==
From roughly 1600–1900, the Apocalypse of Thomas was only known to exist by hostile references to it in the sixth century Gelasian Decree, which condemned the work as apocrypha not to be read. Since 1900, manuscripts have been discovered that have enabled scholars to piece together a history of the text. These manuscripts are largely in Latin, notably a 9th century manuscript from Benediktbeuern Abbey. An Anglo-Saxon language version was discovered in the Vercelli Book, and fragments have been found in three other Old English manuscripts. Translations have also been found in Old Irish and Middle Irish texts such as the Saltair na Rann and In Tenga Bithnua. No known single manuscript contains a complete text of any variant; scholars have resorted to piecing together eclectic versions from combinations of manuscripts.

The text was probably written in Greek between the second and the fourth century, perhaps in Syria or Persia. It was then independently copied and translated in Latin in Italy or North Africa; the varying translations of the same underlying work explain various differences in the text between manuscripts. There are two recensions of the text, a longer and a shorter. Likely revisions and variations other than the two known ones existed as well.

The long version includes a preamble described by some scholars as an interpolation. This is suggested to have been added in the fifth century. Specifically, the long version of the text includes a reference to a king who will reign just before the end times who is a "lover of the law" but who "will not rule for long". He will have two sons. The younger prince will outlive the elder prince, and both sons will "oppress the nations." Mysteriously, the first prince is "named after the first letter" and the second "after the eighth." Some scholars believe that this passage can be used to date the long version, on the logic that the author probably believed that they themselves were living in the end times and found the powers of their day intolerable. Emperor Theodosius I (reigned 379–395) had two sons, Arcadius and Honorius, and the younger Honorius indeed outlived Arcadius by 15 years. Their names start with 'A' and 'H', the first and eighth letters of the Latin alphabet. If this supposition is correct that the passage refers to the rule of Arcadius and Honorius, that would place the long version's authorship in the early fifth century. Some scholars, especially in the early 20th century, have attributed the addition to the influence of Priscillianism and/or Manichaeism. This may have led to its condemnation in the Gelasian Decree, although this is complicated as the Decree does not describe the work's content nor offer a direct reason for why the works it lists were forbidden. Not all scholars agree that a Priscillianist or Manichean influence is present. Charles Wright, and various other 21st-century scholars, have called the alleged parallels to Priscillianism and Manichaeism vague, and easily explained as references to common works and themes cited by all Christian writers.

Hydatius, an Iberian bishop of the 5th century, wrote in marginalia of an "apocryphal book that is claimed to be by the apostle Thomas" that said the Second Coming of Jesus would be nine jubilees of fifty years after Jesus's ascension – that is, very close to Hydatius's own time. This might have been an entirely different text, as surviving manuscripts of the Apocalypse of Thomas written in later centuries contain no such prediction. Still, structural similarities in Hydatius's description of a revelation of Thomas concerning the end times suggests it is possible he was referring to the same work, if an earlier version that has since been lost.

== Content ==
When the hour of the end draws near, there will be great signs in heaven for seven days, and the powers of heaven will be moved.

— Apocalypse of Thomas, short version, verse 4

The apocalypse is attributed to merely "Thomas", without clarifying which one. Thomas the Apostle is one possibility, as is one of Mani's three closest disciples, who was named Thomas. The work is not very long, with only 13 paragraphs in the short version, and 28 paragraphs in the longer version. The longer version opens with a preamble describing the signs of the end times, the coming of evil kings, and the arrival of the Antichrist. In both the longer and shorter versions, Thomas then relates a vision by God describing the end of the world over a period of seven days, and what will happen on each. There is a rain of blood; heaven's gates open; a great earthquake occurs; celestial bodies cease their work; and so on. On the eighth day, the elect are delivered up unto God, whereupon they rejoice over the destruction of the sinful mortal realm.

The depiction of Christ's arrival on Earth echoes Psalm 104 1–6.

== Related works ==
Aurelio de Santos Otero writes that the author appears to be familiar with, or at least was influenced by, various other apocalyptic literature other than the Apocalypse of John, including the Assumption of Moses, the Ascension of Isaiah, and the Sibylline Oracles. Charles Wright also argues that the long version loosely quotes 6 Ezra 15:14.

== Influence ==
The Apocalypse of Thomas was widespread in Northwestern Europe, with manuscripts dating between the eighth and the eleventh century. Despite the condemnation in the Gelasian Decree, this did not seem to curtail its popularity: the Apocalypse was most likely accepted as canonical "in certain parts of Western Christendom in the ninth and tenth centuries". A number of medieval homilies reference the Apocalypse of Thomas or its content. These medieval adaptations generally focused on the most dramatic and terrifying parts, such as the foretold mass destruction. Mary Jett suggests that the medieval interest may not entirely match the original use of the work in the times of the Roman Empire; she notes that some older manuscripts include a full eighth day of the end times which is more triumphant, where an Angel of Peace liberates the elect, and the depiction of this happy eighth day can be as long as the other seven days put together.

The interpolated version of the Apocalypse is notable for having inspired the Fifteen Signs before Doomsday, a list of fifteen signs given over fifteen days announcing Judgment Day, a visionary list which spread all over Europe and remained popular possibly into Shakespeare's day.

Charles Wright speculates that the Anglo-Saxon version of the Apocalypse of Thomas found in the Vercelli Book may have included redactions by the compiler and/or translator hostile to the English Benedictine Reform of the late 10th century when the book was written. This version seems hostile to some sort of new priestly establishment, and ties the alleged corruption of these "young kings, young popes, young bishops and young ealdormense" to the approaching doomsday.
