= Libellus precum =

Collection of Prayers

A libellus precum (literally "booklet of prayings, booklet of petitions", plural: libelli precum) is a medieval collection of prayers, a prayerbook, in the manuscript form, although the term is applied by scholars to texts of some other types. The beginning of the scholarship recognizing them as a distinct type of literature is attributed to André Wilmart. The Encyclopedia of the Middle Ages says they are coming mainly from the Anglo-Saxon and Celtic lands.

Typically libelli precum are unique texts, varying in prayers collected. The texts of prayers may be or may not be unique.

Notable examples include Ælfwine's Prayerbook, folia Gertudiana, the prayerbook of Princess Gertrude of Poland included into the Egbert Psalter, Nawojka's Prayerbook

== Usage as text titles ==
There are several historical texts referred to by the title Libellus Precum (in both meanings):

- Libellus precum ad Imperatores, a petition to the civil authority by two Luciferian clergy called Faustinus and Marcellinus
- John of Fécamp's Libellus precum
- Libellus precum by Bede
