= Wilhelm Ebel =

German scholar of Early Germanic law and Nazi

- Born: 7 June 1908; Garsuche, East Prussia
- Died: 22 June 1980 (aged 71); Göttingen, West Germany

Academic background
- Education: University of Königsberg; Heidelberg University; University of Bonn

Academic work
- Discipline: Early Germanic law
- Institutions: University of Göttingen; University of Freiburg

Wilhelm Ebel (7 June 1908 – 22 June 1980) was a scholar of Early Germanic law, known for editing and translating a number of law codes. During the Third Reich, he was a committed Nazi, with military, administrative, and research service in the SS. His academic career was interrupted by imprisonment after the end of World War II.

== Life and career ==
Ebel was born in Garsuche, East Prussia (now an outlying district of Jelcz-Laskowice, in Poland). His father's family were Russian migrants; his mother's family hailed from Switzerland. He did his Abitur in 1927 in Rößel (now Reszel, also in Poland), and studied law, history, and philology at the University of Königsberg and Heidelberg University. Ebel completed his Habilitation at the University of Bonn in 1935 and after working as a docent at the Universities of Marburg, Königsberg and Rostock, received his first professorial appointment at Rostock in 1938. He spent most of his career at the University of Göttingen, where he began work in April 1939 and in October of the same year succeeded Herbert Oskar Meyer as the professor of German legal history, civil and mercantile law, agricultural and privatization law.

=== Nazi Party ===
Ebel joined the Nazi Party shortly after they came to power, on 1 May 1933. He was a local party official while in Bonn. Following his Habilitation, he joined the Association of Nazi Docents, where he was local leader. Beginning in 1935, he was active in the Sicherheitsdienst, and in Rostock he worked for the Gau administration and represented the party on the law faculty. He worked as a scholar for both the Amt Rosenberg and, beginning in October 1938, the Ahnenerbe division of the SS.

After the outbreak of war, he volunteered for the Waffen-SS and served with the Totenkopf division in the Battle of France, returning to Göttingen in August 1940. The following year, he joined the Allgemeine SS, where he was promoted to Untersturmführer. After another brief period of military service, he was assigned to the Führungshauptamt of the SS and then became division head for Indo-European and German legal history at the Rasse- und Siedlungshauptamt. From November 1941 onwards, he was chief of race and settlement for the Waffen-SS. In October 1942 he became Ahnenerbe division leader for "Legal history of Germans in the East". In 1943 he was promoted to Hauptsturmführer, after which he again returned to Göttingen.

=== Post-war ===
Ebel became a prisoner of war of the Allies in May 1945, lost his status as a civil servant under an act of the British occupation authorities on 10 July that year, and was then interned for more than two years until 1948. After that he worked for the Gothaer insurance company. In March 1949, he was able to have his classification reduced to that of Mitläufer (fellow traveler), and in September 1950 to have his privileges as a civil servant restored, but he had meanwhile been succeeded in his professorship by Hans Thieme. In April 1952, he was given a teaching position at the university. In March 1954, after Thieme had left to take up a chair at the University of Freiburg, he once more became a full professor. (He had unsuccessfully requested the faculty to appoint him to a different chair that was open.) He took early retirement at 56 for health reasons in April 1965, but headed the university archives until 1978. Until his retirement from that position, he successfully prevented research into the Nazi period at the university.

== Research ==
Ebel's primary specializations were constitutional history and the history of law, in particular early Germanic law. He was a member of the Konstanzer Arbeitskreis für mittelalterliche Geschichte, an association of medievalists, and beginning in 1959 of the Historische Kommission für Niedersachsen und Westfalen (Historical Commission for Lower Saxony and Westphalia). He edited and translated a number of early Germanic law codes including the Asega-bôk, the legal code for the Rustringian Frisians and one of the oldest surviving continental Germanic law codes. Despite his commitment to Nazism, his publications included a 1936 refutation of the notion that the employment contract derived from the relationship of Germanic followers with their lord.

== Honors ==
Ebel was awarded the gold medal of honor of the city of Lübeck in 1967, of the city of Goslar in 1973, and of Kiel University also in 1973, and the Brothers Grimm Prize of the University of Marburg the same year.

== Selected works ==
- Geschichte der Gesetzgebung in Deutschland. Göttinger rechtswissenschaftliche Studien 24. 2nd ed. 1958 repr. with additions, ed. Friedrich Ebel. Göttingen: Schwartz, 1988. ISBN 9783509014211 (in German)
- Curiosa iuris Germanici. Kleine Vandenhoeck-Reihe 283/284. Göttingen: Vandenhoeck & Ruprecht, 1968. OCLC 3026669
- Probleme der deutschen Rechtsgeschichte. Göttinger rechtswissenschaftliche Studien 100. Göttingen: Schwartz, 1978. ISBN 9783509010282 (in German)
