= Prick of Conscience =

Early 14th century Middle English devotional poem

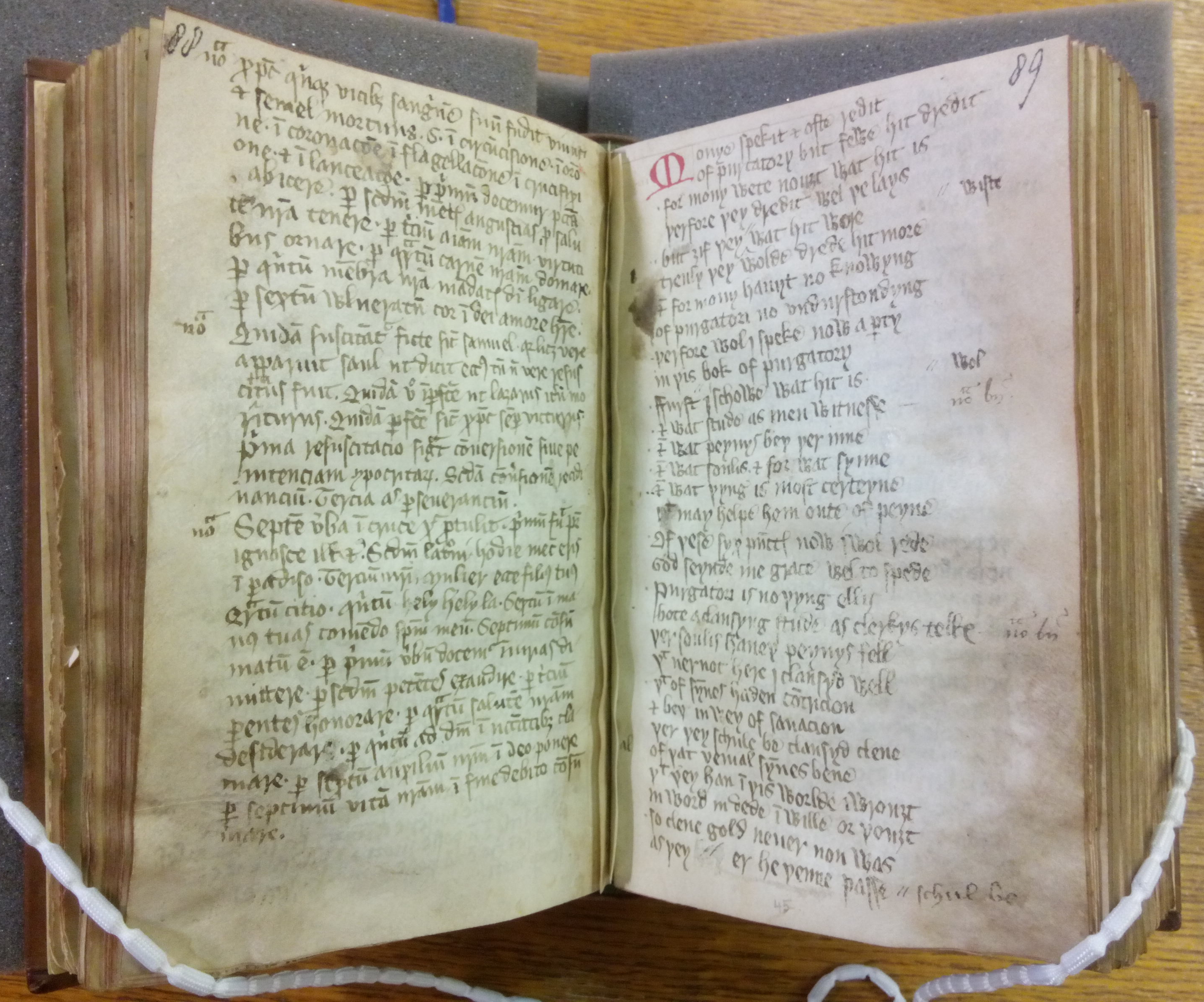
pp 88–89 of Leeds University, Brotherton Library, BC MS 500 (Prick of Conscience). Catalogue record

The Prick of Conscience is a Middle English poem dating from the first half of the fourteenth century promoting penitential reflection. It is, in terms of the number of surviving manuscripts, the most popular poem written in English before print, with over 130 known copies.

The text is divided into seven sections: man's sinfulness, the transient nature of the world, death, purgatory, doomsday and its tokens, hell, and heaven.

== Date and authorship ==
The Prick of Conscience itself says nothing to identify its date, but it can be roughly dated from works which refer to it, showing that it existed when they were written, and from works on which it draws, showing that those works existed when it was written. On this basis its editors place it "in the second quarter of the fourteenth century", i.e. roughly 1325–1350.

The poem also contains no identifying information about its author. Five manuscripts attribute it to Richard Rolle, three attribute it to Robert Grosseteste, and one attributes it to Alcuin of York. The latter two attributions are chronologically impossible, and the attribution to Rolle was considered highly implausible by Hope Emily Allen, a leading authority on his work. Contemporary scholars therefore consider the poem anonymous.

== Influence ==
The Prick of Conscience's popularity can be judged from the fact that it survives in about 130 manuscripts – more than any other Old or Middle English poem. A wide range of churchmen and lay men and women owned or accessed manuscripts of the poem; Agnes Paston, a member of the family who produced the Paston Letters, is known to have borrowed a copy, from a burgess of Great Yarmouth.

John Lydgate mentions the poem in his Fall of Princes, and Chaucer might allude to it at the beginning of the Parson's Tale, the last of his Canterbury Tales.

=== Appearance in stained glass ===
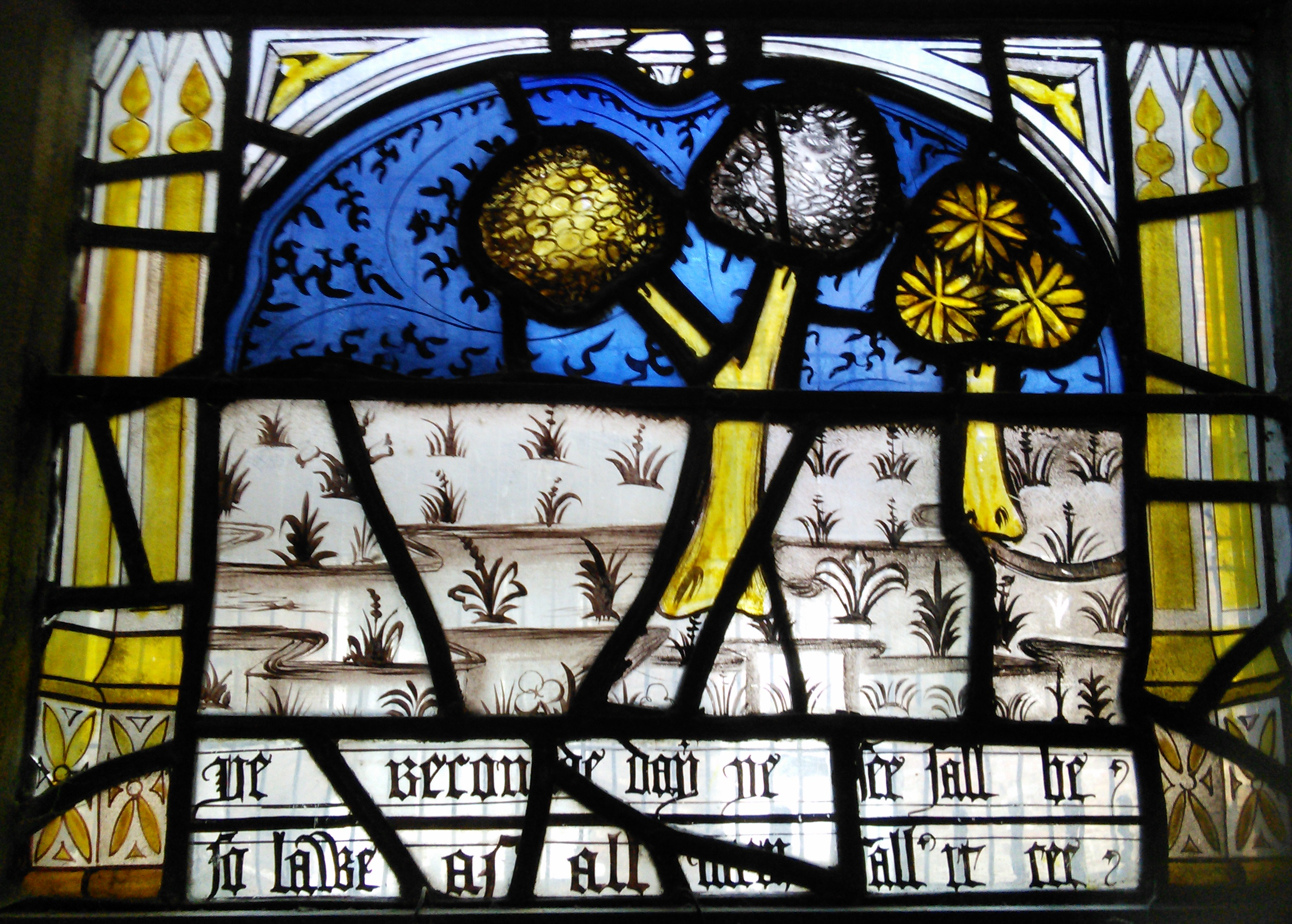
Bottom central panel of the Prick of Conscience Window in All Saints’ Church, North Street, York, showing the second sign of doom: "þe seconde day þe see sall be so lawe as all men sall it see" (cf. "¶The secounde day hit shal be low / That unnethe men shul hitte knowe" in the main manuscript version, ll. 5.753-54).

Unusually, passages from and illustrations of the account of the Fifteen Signs of Doom in the Prick of Conscience appear in stained glass form in the "Prick of Conscience Window" in All Saints' Church, North Street, York. The window is thought to have been constructed around 1410–1420.

== Editions ==
- Richard Morris, ed., The 'Pricke of Conscience' ('Stimulus Conscientiae'), A Northumbrian Poem by Richard Rolle de Hampole (Berlin: A. Asher & Co., 1863)
- James H. Morey, ed., Prik of Conscience, TEAMS Middle English Texts Series (Kalamazoo, MI: Medieval Institute Publications, 2012)
- Ralph Hanna and Sarah Wood, eds., Richard Morris's 'Prick of Conscience': A Corrected and Amplified Reading Text, Early English Text Society, O.S. 342 (Oxford: Oxford University Press, 2013)
- Jean E. Jost, ed., The 'Pricke of Conscience': An Annotated Edition of the Southern Recension (Jefferson, NC: McFarland, 2020)
