= Charter of Christ =

The Charter of Christ is a Christian metaphor that appears prominently in two Middle English poems: the "Short Charter of Christ" (New Index of Middle English Verse number 4184, Digital Index of Middle English Verse number 6769), surviving in at least fifteen manuscripts, and the "Long Charter of Christ", surviving in at least three manuscripts, in versions of 234, 418, and 618 lines (respectively Digital Index of Middle English Verse nos 2859, 6650, and 1913; New Index of Middle English Verse nos 1718, 4154, and 1174). The metaphor is that the body of the crucified Jesus Christ is a charter: a legal document, in this case promising that if humans love Christ they will in return receive eternal bliss after death. According to Laura Ashe, "in the 'Long Charter' the metaphor is fully [...] developed such that Christ's skin has been stretched on the cross to make the parchment, the scourges of his attackers the pen, his blood (and sometimes also the spittle of the Jews) the ink, the wound in his side the seal". This image has also been argued to have influenced the depiction of Christ in the fourteenth-century poem Piers Plowman.
