= Wybren Jan Buma =

Wybren Jan Buma (1910–1999) was a scholar of Frisian languages and history, known for editing and translating Germanic law codes including the Asega-bôk (his was the first modern scholarly edition thereof), the legal code for the Rustringian Frisians and one of the oldest surviving continental Germanic law codes.
