= Anita Buma =

Dutch Antarctic researcher

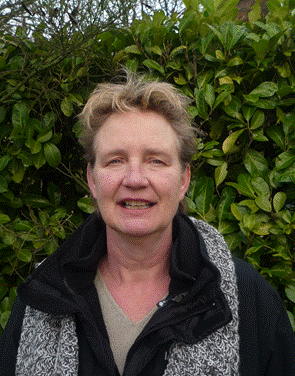
- Born: 1958 (age 67–68); Groningen
- Education: University of Groningen
- Scientific career
- Fields: Microalgal ecophysiology
- Workplaces: University of Groningen
- Website: Anita Buma at the University of Groningen

Anita Gerry Johanna Buma (born 1958) is a Dutch Antarctic researcher, best known for her work on ecophysiology of marine microalgae. She was the first Dutch female researcher in Antarctica.

== Early life and education ==
Buma obtained her Biology master's degree at the University of Groningen (1984). She then moved to the Royal Institute for Sea Research (Texel, The Netherlands) where she began her PhD research on Antarctic phytoplankton growth and species composition. Upon invitation by Alfred Wegener Institute for Polar und Meeresforschung Bremerhaven, Germany, she participated in two field campaigns (Ark III, legs 1,2 and 3) to the Fram Strait, high Arctic, in 1985, where she studied phytoplankton abundance and species composition. Buma defended her PhD thesis in 1992 at the University of Groningen.

== Career and impact ==
Buma's research focuses on (marine) microalgal ecophysiology and diversity in response to climate change. Specific research topics include impacts of trace metals, enhanced UVR and changing meltwater dynamics on growth and diversity of marine Antarctic phytoplankton.

Since 1992, Buma devoted her work to the possible adverse impacts of enhanced UV-B radiation on Antarctic phytoplankton, as a result of stratospheric ozone depletion. As a result of this work she obtained a Meervoud Grant in 2002 by the Netherlands Organisation for Scientific Research. This research was focused on Effects of trace nutrients on the defense potential of oceanic phytoplankton against solar ultraviolet radiation. Within this project she worked for one year at the Australian Antarctic Division, Kingston, Tasmania, as a guest researcher. Buma has been the chair of the Department of Ocean Ecosystems at the Faculty of Science and Engineering of the University of Groningen since January 2012.

She was a member of the Netherlands Polar Committee from September 2010 – August 2014 and member of the Dutch SCAR committee between 2005 and 2010. She also served in the Scientific Advisory Board of the trilateral (Argentinean, German, Dutch) Research station Dallmann Research Station, King George Island, between 2006 and 2011, and in the Scientific Steering Committee Dutch Antarctic Rothera Station research facilities between 2011 and 2013.

Buma was the Chief Editor of the Dutch popular science book "Door de kou bevangen" (2016), about fifty years of history of Dutch polar research.

== Selected works ==
- Buma, A.G.J., H.J.W. de Baar, R.F. Nolting, A.J. van Bennekom. 1991. Metal enrichment experiments in the Weddell-Scotia Seas: Effects of iron and manganese on various plankton communities. Limnol. Oceanogr. 36(8): 1865-1878
- Alderkamp A.-C., Mills M.M., Van Dijken G.L., Laan P., Thuroczy C.-E., Gerringa L.J.A., De Baar H.J.W., Payne C., Tortell P., Visser R.J.W., Buma A.G.J., Arrigo K.R. 2012. Iron from melting glaciers fuels phytoplankton blooms in Amundsen Sea (Southern Ocean): Phytoplankton characteristics and productivity. Deep-Sea Research 71-76: 42-48
