= Jonathan Buma =

Former FBI agent

Jonathan C. Buma
- Political party: Democratic
- Criminal charge: Illegal disclosure of confidential information
- Website: www.bumaforcongress.com

Jonathan Buma is a former United States Federal Bureau of Investigation (FBI) agent.

In 2019, he began investigating Russian efforts to compromise Rudy Giuliani's investigation of the Biden family during the 2020 presidential campaign.

In March 2025, Buma was arrested on suspicion of leaking government secrets.

== Career ==
Buma was a Special Agent for the FBI for 16 years, most of it specializing in Russian counterintelligence.

=== Whistleblower complaint ===
In July 2023, Buma alleged in a statement to the Senate Judiciary Committee that Giuliani had been used as an asset by Pavel Fuks for a Russian disinformation operation that aimed to discredit Joe Biden and boost Donald Trump during the 2020 election.

Buma also claimed that in August 2022 an FBI supervisor had told him to stop investigating Giuliani and to cut off contact with any sources who reported on corruption by Trump associates.

=== Informants ===
==== Peter Thiel ====
In October 2023, Business Insider reported that Peter Thiel had been providing information to Buma as a confidential human source since May 2021.

==== Chuck Johnson ====
Buma was reportedly introduced to Thiel via Chuck Johnson, who was also an FBI source for Buma.

==== Dynamo ====
One of Buma's unnamed sources, "Dynamo", had reportedly arranged for two Ukrainian associates to visit the United States Attorney's office in Los Angeles in January 2019 to discuss corruption, oligarchs, and both Ukrainian and American political figures. However, some of their allegations, which detailed unreported lobbying by Hunter Biden as well as money laundering by George Soros, were suspected of being Russian disinformation.

In December 2024, "Dynamo", who was later identified as Israeli-American businessman Alexander Smirnov, plead guilty to making false statements to the FBI, and in February 2025 was sentenced to six years in prison.

== Arrest ==
On November 13, 2023, the FBI raided Buma's Los Angeles-area home.

On March 17, 2025, Buma was arrested at JFK Airport and charged with illegally disclosing confidential information about FBI sources. Buma has denied wrongdoing.

== U.S. House of Representatives ==
On May 1, 2025, Buma announced that he would run for the United States House of Representatives in Arizona's 6th congressional district.
