= List of works by Bede =

The following is a list of works by Bede.

== Bede's list of his works ==
At the end of Bede's most famous work, the Historia ecclesiastica gentis Anglorum, Bede lists his works. His list includes several books that have not survived to the present day; it also omits a few works of his which he either omitted or which he wrote after he finished the Historia. His list follows, with an English translation given; the title used to describe the work in this article is also given, for easier reference.

Bede's list of his works	English translation	Name of the work in this article
In principium Genesis, usque ad natiuitatem Isaac et eiectionem Ismahelis, libros III	On the beginning of Genesis, to the nativity of Isaac, and the reprobation of Ismael, three books	Commentary on Genesis
De tabernaculo et uasis eius, ac uestibus sacerdotum, libros III.	Of the tabernacle and its vessels, and of the priestly vestments, three books.	De tabernaculo
In primam partem Samuelis, id est usque ad mortem Saulis, libros III.	On the first part of Samuel, to the death of Saul, four books.	Commentary on Samuel
De aedificatione templi, allegoricae expositionis, sicut et cetera, libros II.	Of the building of the temple, of allegorical exposition, like the rest, two books.	De templo Salomonis
Item, in Regum librum XXX quaestionum.	Item, on the book of Kings, thirty questions.	Quaestiones XXX
In Prouerbia Salomonis libros III.	On Solomon's Proverbs, three books.	Commentary on Proverbs
In Cantica canticorum libros VII.	On the Canticles, seven books.	Commentary on the Song of Songs
In Isaiam, Danihelem, XII prophetas, et partem Hieremiae, distinctiones capitulorum ex tractatu beati Hieronimi excerptas.	On Isaiah, Daniel, the twelve prophets, and part of Jeremiah, distinction of chapters, collected out of St. Jerome's treatise.	No extant manuscript
In Ezram et Neemiam libros III.	On Esdras and Nehemiah, three books	Commentary on Ezra and Nehemiah
In Canticum Habacum librum I.	On the song of Habakkuk, one book	Commentary on the Prayer of Habakkuk
In librum beati patris Tobiae explanationis allegoricae de Christo et ecclesia librum I.	On the book of the blessed father Tobias, one book of allegorical exposition concerning Christ and the Church	Commentary on Tobit
Item, Capitula lectionum in Pentateucum Mosi, Iosue, Iudicum;	Also, chapters of readings on Moses's Pentateuch, Joshua, and Judges	No extant manuscript
In libros Regum et Uerba dierum;	On the books of Kings and Chronicles	No extant manuscript
In librum beati patris Iob;	On the book of the blessed father Job	No extant manuscript
In Parabolas, Ecclesiasten, et Cantica canticorum;	On the parables, Ecclesiastes, and canticles	No extant manuscript
In Isaiam prophetam, Ezram quoque et Neemiam.	On the prophets Isaiah, Esdras, and Nehemiah	No extant manuscript
In evangelium Marci libros IIII.	On the gospel of Mark, four books	Commentary on Mark
In euangelium Lucae libros VI.	On the gospel of Luke, six books.	Commentary on Luke
Omeliarum euangelii libros II.	Of homilies on the gospel, two books	Homilies
In apostolum quaecumque in opusculis sancti Augustini exposita inueni, cuncta per ordinem transscribere curaui.	On the Apostle, I have carefully transcribed in order all that I have found in St. Augustine's works.	Collectaneum on the Pauline Epistles
In Actus apostolorum libros II.	On the acts of the Apostles, two books.	Commentary on Acts & Retractation
In Epistulas VII catholicas libros singulos.	On the seven catholic epistles, a book on each.	Commentary on the Catholic Epistles
In Apocalypsin sancti Iohannis libros III.	On the Revelation of St. John, three books.	Commentary on the Apocalypse
Item, Capitula lectionum in totum nouum testamentum, excepto euangelio.	Also, chapters of readings on all the New Testament, except the Gospel	No extant manuscript
Item librum epistularum ad diuersos: quarum de sex aetatibus saeculi una est; de mansionibus filiorum Israel una; una de eo, quod ait Isaias: 'Et claudentur ibi in carcerem, et post dies multos uisitabantur;' de ratione bissexti una; de aequinoctio iuxta Anatolium una.	Also a book of epistles to different persons, of which one is of the six ages of the world; one of the mansions of the children of Israel; one on the works of Isaiah, "And they shall be shut up in the prison, and after many days shall they be visited"; one of the reasons of the bissextile or leap-year; and of the equinox, according to Anatolius.	Letter to Plegwin; Letter to Acca "de mansionibus filiorum Israhel"; Letter to Acca "de eo quod ait Isaias"; Letter to Helmwald; Letter to Wicthede
Item de historiis sanctorum: librum uitae et passionis sancti Felicis confessoris de metrico Paulini opere in prosam transtuli	Also, of the histories of saints. I translated the book of the life and passion of St Felix, Confessor, from Paulinus's work in metre, into prose.	Life of St. Felix
Librum uitae et passionis sancti Anastasii, male de Greco translatum, et peius a quodam inperito emendatum, prout potui, ad sensum correxi	The book of the life and passion of St Anastasius, which was ill translated from the Greek, and worse amended by some unskilful person, I have corrected as to the sense.	Life of St. Anastasius
Uitam sancti patris monachi simul et antistitis Cudbercti, et prius heroico metro et postmodum plano sermone, descripsi.	I have written the life of the holy father Cuthbert, who was both monk and prelate, first in heroic verse, and then in prose.	Life of St. Cuthbert (verse) and Life of St. Cuthbert (prose)
Historiam abbatum monasterii huius, in quo supernae pietati deseruire gaudeo, Benedicti, Ceolfridi, et Huaetbercti in libellis duobus.	The history of the Abbots of this monastery, in which I rejoice to serve the divine goodness, viz. Benedict, Ceolfrith, and Hwaetberht, in two books	History of the Abbots of Wearmouth and Jarrow
Historiam ecclesiasticam nostrae insulae ac gentis in libris V.	The ecclesiastical history of our island and nation, in five books.	Ecclesiastical History of the English People
Martyrologium de nataliciis sanctorum martyrum diebus; in quo omnes, quos inuenire potui, non-solum qua die, uerum etiam quo genere certaminis, uel sub quo iudice mundum uicerint, diligenter adnotare studui.	The martyrology of the birth-days of the holy martyrs, in which I have carefully endeavoured to set down all that I could find, and not only on what day, but also by what sort of combat, or under what judge they overcame the world	Martyrology
Librum hymnorum diuerso metro siue rhythmo.	A book of hymns in several sorts of metre, or rhyme	Hymns (incomplete?)
Librum epigrammatum heroico metro, siue elegiaco.	A book of epigrams in heroic or elegiac verse	Liber epigrammatum
De natura rerum, et de temporibus libros singulos	Of the nature of things, and of the times, one book of each	De natura rerum; De temporibus
Item de temporibus librum I maiorem	Also, of the times, one larger book	De temporum ratione
Librum de orthographia, alfabeti ordine distinctum	A book of orthography digested in alphabetical order	De orthographia
Item librum de metrica arte, et huic adiectum alium de schematibus siue tropis libellum, hoc est de figuris modisque locutionum, quibus scriptura sancta contexta est.	Also a book of the art of poetry, and to it I have added another little book of tropes and figures; that is, of the figures and manners of speaking in which the holy scriptures are written.	De arte metrica; De schematibus et tropis

In addition, the following works are listed below but are not mentioned by Bede:

- De Locis Sanctis
- Letter to Albinus
- Letter to Egbert
- De die iudicii
- A poem in thirteen couplets
- Paenitentiale Bedae

== Works ==
=== Biblical commentaries ===
Commentary on Acts

- Description: Completed shortly after 709.
- Latin titles: One of the two books referred to in Bede's list as In actus apostolorum libros II
- Editions:
  - ed. Laistner

Retractation

- Description: Probably completed between 725 and 731.
- Latin titles: One of the two books referred to in Bede's list as In actus apostolorum libros II
- Editions:
  - ed. Laistner

Commentary on the Apocalypse

- Description: Completed between 702 and 709.
- Latin titles: Explanatio Apocalypsis (also Expositio Apocalypseos). Described in Bede's list as In apocalypsin sancti Iohannis libros III
- Editions:
  - ed. Roger Gryson. Bedae presbyteri Expositio Apocalypseos. CCSL 121A. Bedae Opera 2:5. Turnhout: Brepols, 2001.

Commentary on the Catholic Epistles

- Description: One of these seven commentaries (on John I) is known to have been completed at the same time as the Commentary on Acts, which was completed shortly after 709. It is possible that the commentaries were not all completed at the same time.
- Latin titles: Described in Bede's list as In epistolas VII catholicas libros singulos
- Editions:

Collectaneum on the Pauline Epistles

- Description:
- Latin titles: Described in Bede's list as In apostolum quaecumque in opusculis sancti Augustini exposita inveni, cuncta per ordinem transscribere curavi
- Editions: In Migne's Patrology, a work by Florus on the Pauline Epistles was printed as by Bede; the error was subsequently recognized but no edition of this work of Bede's has yet been printed.

Commentary on Ezra and Nehemiah

- Description: Composed between 725 and 731.
- Latin titles: Described in Bede's list as In Ezram et Neemiam libros II
- Editions:

Commentary on Genesis

This exists in two forms; an early version in two books, and a later, revised version in four books. The work comments on the first twenty chapters of Genesis and the first ten verses of the twenty-first chapter.

Commentary on the Prayer of Habakkuk

It is not known when Bede composed this commentary. Bede dedicated the work to "his dearly beloved sister and virgin of Christ", but gives no further clues to the dedicatee's identity. Bede's commentary draws on the work of Jerome and on Augustine's City of God.

Commentary on Luke

- Description: Composed between 709 and 716.
- Latin titles: Described in Bede's list as In evangelium Lucae libros VI
- Editions:

Commentary on Mark

- Description: Composed after 716.
- Latin titles: Described in Bede's list as In evangelium Marci libros IIII
- Editions:

Commentary on Proverbs

- Description: The date of composition of this work cannot be fixed, though it is likely to have been composed at about the same time as the Commentary on the Song of Songs.
- Latin titles: Described in Bede's list as In proverbia salomonis libros III. Also appears in some manuscripts as In parabolas Salomonis, or Super parabolas Salomonis.
- Editions:

Quaestiones XXX

- Description: The date of composition of this work cannot be fixed; Laistner suggests that it is similar in style to Bede's later biblical commentaries and may have been composed in about 725. The work consists of answers to thirty questions posed by Nothhelm to Bede on passages from I and II Samuel, and I and II Kings.
- Latin titles: Described in Bede's list as In regum librum quaestiones XXX. Also appears in some manuscripts as In parabolas Salomonis, or Super parabolas Salomonis.
- Editions:

Commentary on Samuel

- Description: The first three books were written by June 716, when Abbot Ceolfrith departed for Rome; the fourth book was begun after Ceolfrith's successor, Hwaetberht, had been appointed.
- Latin titles: Described in Bede's list as In primam partem Samuhelis, id est usque ad mortem Saulis libros IIII.
- Editions:

Commentary on the Song of Songs

- Description: This work, one of Bede's longest, consists of an introduction on Divine Grace; five books of commentary on the Song of Songs; and a final section of extracts from the works of Gregory the Great. It is not known when any of these parts were composed.
- Latin titles: Described in Bede's list as In cantica canticorum librum VII.
- Editions:

De tabernaculo

- Description: The date of composition is uncertain but is likely to have been around 721, or perhaps shortly thereafter.
- Latin titles: Described in Bede's list as De tabernaculo et vasis eius ac vestibus sacerdotum, libros III.
- Editions:

De templo Salomonis

Composed not long before 731. This work discusses the passage in 1 Kings 3:1 to 7:51 in which Solomon builds a temple. Bede was here extending a long tradition of commentary on the temple in patristic literature.

Commentary on Tobit

Laistner suggests that this may have been written at about the same time as De templo Salmonis, since in both Bede stresses allegorical interpretation; however, he comments that there is no textual evidence to support this. There is no other indication of the date of composition. As with the commentary on Habakkuk, Bede draws on the work of Jerome and on Augustine's City of God.

=== Geography ===
De Locis Sanctis

- Description: Probably composed before 709; the dates of 702–703 have been suggested and seem likely to be correct.
- Latin titles: Not mentioned by Bede in his list of his works.
- Editions:

=== Hagiography ===
Life of St. Anastasius

There are no surviving manuscripts of this work, though one did survive as late as the 15th century.

Life of St. Felix

An adaptation into prose of four poems on St Felix by Paulinus of Nola.

Life of St. Cuthbert (verse)

Bede wrote two lives of St Cuthbert; this one is in verse and was probably composed between 705 and 716. The first printed edition was by Canisius, in his Antiquae Lectiones, which appeared between 1601 and 1604. Laistner lists twenty manuscripts, including one fragment; a 20th-century edition that includes a discussion of nineteen of the manuscripts is Werner Jaager, Bedas metrische Vita Sancti Cuthberti (1935).

Life of St. Cuthbert (prose)

Bede wrote two lives of St Cuthbert; this one is in prose and was composed in about 721. It is in part based on an earlier life of St Cuthbert, anonymous but probably written by a monk of Lindisfarne.

Martyrology

- Description: Bede probably wrote this between 725 and 731.
- Latin titles: Described in Bede's list as Martyrologium de nataliciis sanctorum martyrum diebus; in quo omnes, quos invenire potui, non-solum qua die, verum etiam quo genere certaminis, vel sub quo iudice mundum vicerint, diligenter adnotare studui.
- Editions:

=== History ===
Ecclesiastical History of the English People

- Description: A history of the founding and growth of the English church, from the mission of Augustine of Canterbury to Bede's day. Includes a short introductory section on the history of Britain prior to Augustine's mission.
- Latin titles: Described in Bede's list as Historiam ecclesiasticam nostrae insulae ac gentis in libris V. Generally known as Historia ecclesiastica gentis Anglorum.
- Editions:
  - Bede (1969). Colgrave, Bertram and R.A.B. Mynors (ed.). Bede's Ecclesiastical History of the English People. Oxford.
  - Bede (1994). McClure, Judith and Roger Collins (ed.). The Ecclesiastical History of the English People. Oxford: Oxford University Press. ISBN 0-19-283866-0.

Ecclesiastical History of the English People (Old English version)

- Description: An Old English version of Bede's Ecclesiastical History.
- Latin titles: Described in Bede's list as Historiam ecclesiasticam nostrae insulae ac gentis in libris V.
- Editions:

History of the Abbots of Wearmouth and Jarrow

- Description: This was definitely composed after 716, and was probably completed between 725 and 731.
- Latin titles: Described in Bede's list as Historiam abbatum monasterii huius, in quo supernae pietati deservire gaudeo, Benedicti, Ceolfridi, et Huaetbercti, in libellis duobus.
- Editions:

=== Homilies ===
Homilies

Bede's list of his works refers to two books of homilies, and these are preserved. In addition, innumerable homilies exist that have been attributed to him; in most cases the attribution is spurious but there may be additional homilies of Bede beyond those in the main two books that survive. It is unclear whether the homilies were ever actually preached, or were instead intended for devotional reading. They are organized around particular dates in the church calendar, with forty of them dealing with either Christmas or Easter. The remaining ten are concerned with the feast days of saints. The homilies are thought to be among Bede's later works, dating perhaps to the late 720s. Thirty-four of them were included in a widely disseminated anthology of readings put together in Charlemagne's reign by Paul the Deacon. It is possible that Bede composed these homilies to complement the work of Gregory the Great, who had assembled his own collection of homilies: the two sets of homilies only have one reading in common, and that reading is one which Gregory had indicated needed further attention.

=== Letters ===
Bede lists five letters in the list he gives of his works in the Historia Ecclesiastica, as follows: "Item librum epistolarum ad diversos: quarum de sex aetatibus saeculi una est; de mansionibus filiorum Israhel una; una de eo quod ait Isaias; 'et claudentur ibi in carcerem et post dies multos visitabantur'; de ratione bisexti una; de aequnioctio iuxta Anatolium una". Two additional letters are known: the letter to Albinus he wrote to accompany a copy of the Historia Ecclesiastica, and the Epistle to Egbert. The first five letters below are the ones Bede mentioned; they are given in the same order that Bede describes them.

Letter to Plegwin

One of Bede's works on chronology, De temporibus, led to him being accused of heresy in front of Wilfred, the bishop of York; Bede was not present but heard of the charge from a monk named Plegwin. This letter is Bede's response to Plegwin; he justifies his work and asks Plegwin to deliver the letter to a monk named David so that it could be read to Wilfred. The letter was first published in Dublin in 1664 by Sir James Ware. Five manuscripts survive.

Letter to Acca: "de eo quod ait Isaias"

This letter was first published in 1843 by J. A. Giles, in his edition of the complete works of Bede. Giles used the only known manuscript, Paris B.N. 2840.

Letter to Acca: "de mansionibus filiorum Israhel"

As with the previous letter to Acca, the first publication was in J.A. Giles' 1843 edition of Bede's works. There are two manuscripts of this letter; it appears in Paris B.N. 2840, and also in a manuscript now in Zurich.

Letter to Helmwald

Bede's letter to Helwmald was published in 1980 in the CCSL series, edited by C.W. Jones. An English translation by Faith Wallis appeared in 1999.

Letter to Wicthede

Bede's letter to Wicthede was first printed in Hervagius's 1563 folio editions of Bede's works, but the manuscript Hervagius used included a reference to the year 776. It was argued on this basis that the letter was not by Bede, but subsequently a comparison with other manuscripts determined that the passage was a spurious interpolation, and the letter is now accepted as genuine. Many manuscripts are now known; Laistner lists over thirty.

Letter to Albinus

Bede wrote this short letter to Albinus, the abbot of the monastery of St Peter and St Paul in Canterbury, to thank him for providing documents to Bede to assist him in writing the Ecclesiastical History. With the letter Bede sent a copy of his De templo Salomonis, and also a copy of the History; the date of the letter is therefore after 731, when the History was completed. The letter was sent to Albinus in the hands of Nothhelm, a London priest who subsequently became Archbishop of Canterbury. The text was first published by Jean Mabillon in his Vetera Analecta, which began publication in 1675. Mabillon used a manuscript from the monastery of St Vincent in Metz which has since been lost. The text survives in two twelfth-century manuscripts from Austria: London, British Library, Add. 18329 (from St. Georgenberg-Fiecht), and Göttweig, Stiftsbibliothek, 37 (rot).

Letter to Egbert

This letter is not included in Bede's list of his own writings. Bede completed the letter on 5 November 734, not long before his death on 26 May 735; in it he explains that he is unable to visit Egbert, as he had the previous year, and so is writing to him instead. The letter contains Bede's complaints about what he saw as the errors of the ecclesiastics of his day, including monasteries that were religious in name only, ignorant and careless clergy, and a lack of monastic discipline. Egbert was Bishop of York at the time Bede wrote to him; he was raised to the archbishopric later that year, and Bede was probably aware of his impending elevation. The letter was first published in Dublin in 1664 by Sir James Ware, using Harley 4688, a manuscript now in the British Museum.

=== Hymns and poems ===
In Bede's list of his works, he describes a book of hymns: "Librum hymnorum diverso metro sive rhythmo" and a book of poems: "Librum epigrammatum heroico metro sive elegiaco". Although manuscripts by these names survived to the 15th century, none are extant today. However, some of Bede's verse was transmitted through other manuscripts. In addition, Bede included poems in several of his prose works, and these have occasionally been copied separately and thus transmitted independently of their parent work.

Hymns

Only one hymn is definitely by Bede; his Hymn on Queen Etheldryd, which is part of his Historia Ecclesiastica but which appears independently in some manuscripts. An additional fifteen hymns are thought to be of Bede's composition. Thirteen of these now survive only in a 16th-century printed edition; two further hymns, on psalms XLI and CXXII, have survived in manuscript form.

De die iudicii

The poem De die iudicii is assigned to Bede by most scholars.

Liber epigrammatum

Bede refers to a book of epigrams; the work is not entirely lost but has survived only in fragments. In the early 16th century, the antiquary John Leland transcribed a selection of epigrams from a now-lost manuscript; his selection includes several epigrams attributed to Bede which are likely to have come from the book Bede refers to. Leland's source was originally owned by Milred, bishop of Worcester from 745 to 775. Historian Michael Lapidge suggests that Milred's collection of epigrams was assembled early in Milred's tenure as bishop, perhaps in about 750.

Bede's Death Song

Cuthbert's letter on Bede's death, the Epistola Cuthberti de obitu Bedae, is understood to indicate that Bede also composed a five line vernacular poem known to modern scholars as Bede's Death Song

Other poems

The only other surviving poem of Bede's that is not part of one of Bede's prose works is a prayer in thirteen elegiac couplets which survives in a tenth-century manuscript in garbled form; it was first printed correctly in 1912.

=== School treatises ===
Bede describes two of his school treatises in his list of works as "Item librum de metrica arte et huic adiectum alium de schematibus sive tropis libellum, hoc est de figuris modisque locutionum, quibus scriptura sancta contexta est". The first is "a book on the art of poetry", and the second is a "little book of tropes and figures; that is, of the figures and manners of speaking in which the Holy Scriptures are written". The majority of extant manuscripts of these treatises contain both of them.

De arte metrica

- Description: This first part is a treatise on Latin metre and prosody, consisting of verse examples with commentary. Having stressed the distinction between letters (litterae, which he leaves for discussion in the second part De schematibus et tropis) and syllables (syllabae), Bede explains the rules of syllabic quantity and the way these apply to metrical patterns. Bede's treatise can be compared with De metris and De pedum regulis by Aldhelm, whose educational approach is more theoretical and mathematical than Bede's and less focused on actual practice. In the event, it was Bede's treatise rather than those of Aldhelm which became the popular textbook until the Renaissance period.
- Latin titles: De Arte Metrica; also known, more rarely, as De Metrica Ratione.
- Editions:
  - ed. C.W. Jones. Bedae opera didascalica. CCSL 123A. 3 vols. Turnhout: Brepols, 1975. 59–141.

De schematibus et tropis

- Description: This second part is a shorter treatise, including an alphabetic overview of letters (litterae) and their importance to scansion.
- Latin titles:
- Editions: Kendall (ed.), CCSL 123A (1975): 81–171; Kendall (ed. and tr.), Libri II De arte metrica et De schematibus et tropis: The Art of Poetry and Rhetoric (1991). Recently, the fragment of a pre-Conquest English copy has been noted in the 11th-century manuscript Worcester Cathedral MS Q.5, which was not used by Kendall in his edition of the work.

De orthographia

- Description:
- Latin titles:
- Editions:

=== Scientific treatises ===
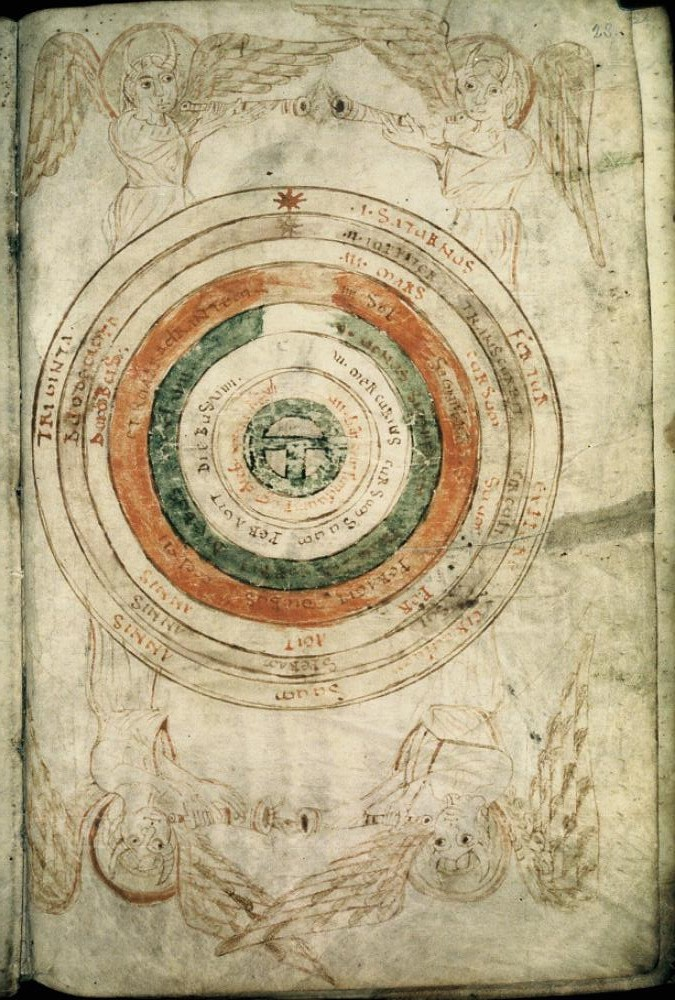
Mappa Mundi (world map) from De natura rerum, in a manuscript now held by the Bodleian Library

De natura rerum

Bede completed De natura rerum shortly after De temporibus, which was written in 703. The work is modelled on the De natura rerum of Isidore of Seville.

De temporibus

This work was completed in 703. It contains a short chronicle which was sometimes copied separately, known as the Chronica minora. There are also manuscripts of De temporibus which omit the chronicle. It is a treatise covering the basics of the computus, the medieval study of calculating the correct dates for the Christian calendar. Bede used much material from Isidore of Seville's Etymologies for this work.

De temporum ratione

This work was completed in 725. It contains a chronicle which was often copied separately, known as the Chronica maiora. There are also manuscripts of De temporum ratione which omit the chronicle. The work was known to medieval readers as De temporibus, but since that was also the title of an earlier work by Bede it was also referred to as De temporibus liiber secundus. Like De temporibus it deals with computus, but at much greater length. Bede's treatment of the topic was widely and rapidly disseminated during the Middle Ages; over one hundred manuscripts have survived to the present day, almost half of which were copied within a century of the work's composition. This may be because Charlemagne instituted educational reforms that included making computus part of the curriculum.

=== Doubtful works ===
De octo quaestionibus

According to Eric Knibbs, the treatise entitled the De octo quaestionibus is a 12th-century creation that cannot be ascribed to Bede, though the eight individual texts gathered under this title are much older. A subset of four (called, in some manuscripts, the Solutiones) are almost certainly Bede's; the authorship of the other four is uncertain.

Patrologia Latina vol. 94 includes a number of homiliae subdititiae "spurious homilies" attributed to Bede.

The so-called Paenitentiale Bedae, a disciplinary work composed between c. 700 and 800, may have been authored by Bede. The idea that Bede wrote a penitential has been accepted as uncontroversial by both medieval and modern scholars, including Hermann Wasserschleben, Bruno Albers and J.T. McNeill. Others, however, including Charles Plummer and M.L.W. Laistner, have challenged the attribution of this work to Bede on the grounds that Bede (they say) was too high-minded and too talented a Latinist to have composed a work of such stylistic simplicity treating such vulgar subjects as drinking, physical violence and sexual deviance. A.J. Frantzen has adopted an agnostic attitude, acknowledging several arguments for and against Bedan authorship that taken together seem to leave the matter presently unanswerable. The most recent and detailed study of the text was carried out by Reinhold Haggenmüller, who pronounced definitively against Bedan authorship; however, Haggenmüller's argument against Bedan authorship is hardly persuasive (it amounts merely to noticing that the oldest manuscript dates to about 60 years after Bede's death). In fact no scholar has yet been able to adduce concrete evidence that either confirms or denies Bedan authorship of the Paenitentiale Bedae. McNeill and Gamer's summary of the problem is still perhaps the most fair and concise:

The fact that no penitential is included by Bede among the works he lists at the end of his Ecclesiastical History ... as of the years 702–31 can hardly be admitted as a conclusive argument against his having written one, in view of the omission from this list of a number of his other known works. The strongest objection to his authorship of this book is the lack of distinction and originality in the work itself. But the author may have intended a revision, which he did not live to make. Probably too, we should not expect to find the marks of genius in a penitential. The nature of these handbooks excludes sublimity.

== Editions of the Latin text and translations into English ==
The following table gives the first publication of each of Bede's works listed above, and also lists a modern edition of the text and a modern translation where available. The table states "None" only where it is definitely known that no printed edition or translation exists.

Name of the work in this article	Text first published	Modern edition	Modern translation
Commentary on Genesis	Winters, Iunilii episcopi Africani (1538), text of 1a only; Wharton, Bedae Venerabilis Opera Quaedam Theologica (1692/1693), text of 2 but omitting 1a; Martène, Venerabilis Bedae (1717), text of 2 including all of 1a.	Jones, CCSL CXVIII A (1967), pp. 1–242.	Kendall, Bede: On Genesis (2008), pp. 65–322.
De tabernaculo	Hervagius, Opera Bedae Venerabilis (1563), or earlier.	Hurst, CCSL CXIX A (1969), pp. 3–139.	Holder, Bede: On the Tabernacle (1994), pp. 1–163.
Commentary on Samuel	Hervagius, Opera Bedae Venerabilis (1563), or earlier.	Hurst, CCSL CXIX (1962), pp. 5–272.	DeGregorio & Love, Bede: On First Samuel (2019).
De templo Salomonis		Hurst, CCSL CXIX A (1969), pp. 143–234.	Connolly, Bede: On the Temple (1995), pp. 1–117.
Quaestiones XXX		Jones, CCSL CXIX (1962), pp. 293–322.	Foley & Holder, A Biblical Miscellany (1999), pp. 89–138.
Commentary on Proverbs		Hurst, CCSL CXIX B (1983), pp. 23–163.	
Commentary on the Song of Songs		Hurst, CCSL CXIX B (1983), pp. 167–375.	Arthur G. Holder (tr.), On the Song of Songs and Selected Writings. Classics of Western Spirituality. (2011).
Commentary on Ezra and Nehemiah		Hurst, CCSL CXIX A (1969), pp. 237–392.	DeGregorio, Bede: On Ezra and Nehemiah (2006).
Commentary on the Prayer of Habakkuk		Hudson, CCSL CXIX B (1983), pp. 381–409.	Connolly, On Tobit and the Canticle of Habakkuk (1997), pp. 65–95.
Commentary on Tobit		Hurst, CCSL CXIX B (1983), pp. 3–19.	Connolly, Bede: On Tobit and the Canticle of Habakkuk (1997), pp. 39–63.
Commentary on Mark	Hervagius, Opera Bedae Venerabilis (1563), or earlier.	Hurst, CCSL CXX (1960), pp. 431–648.	
Commentary on Luke	Hervagius, Opera Bedae Venerabilis (1563), or earlier.	Hurst, CCSL CXX (1960), pp. 6–425.	Wallis & Kendall, Bede: Commentary on the Gospel of Luke (2024).
Homilies		Hurst, CCSL CXXII (1955), pp. 1–378.	Martin & Hurst, Homilies on the Gospels (1991), in two volumes.
Collectaneum on the Pauline Epistles		De Maeyer et al., CCSL CXXI B (2025).	Hurst, Excerpts from the Works of Saint Augustine on the Letters of the Blessed Apostle Paul (1999)
Commentary on Acts		Laistner, CCSL CXXI (1983), pp. 3–99.	Martin, Commentary on the Acts of the Apostles (1989), pp. 3–198.
Retractation	Hervagius, Opera Bedae Venerabilis (1563), VI, cols 1-39, or earlier.		Hurst, CCSL CXXI (1983), pp. 103–163.
Commentary on the Catholic Epistles		Hurst, CCSL CXXI (1983), pp. 181–342.	Hurst, Commentary on the Seven Catholic Epistles (1985), pp. 3–253.
Commentary on the Apocalypse		Gryson, CCSL CXXI A (2001), pp. 218–578.	Wallis, Bede: Commentary on Revelation (2013).
Letter to Plegwin	Ware, Epistolae Duae (1664)	Jones, CCSL CXXIII C (1980), pp. 613–626.	Wallis, Reckoning of Time (1999), pp. 405–415.
Letter to Acca "de eo quod ait Isaias"	Giles, Works Vol. I (1843), pp. 203–214.	Migne, Venerabilis Bedae, Tomus Primus (1862), cols. 702–710.	Foley & Holder, Bede: A Biblical Miscellany (1999), pp. 39–51.
Letter to Acca "de mansionibus filiorum Israhel"	Giles, Works Vol. I (1843), pp. 198–202.	Migne, Venerabilis Bedae, Tomus Primus (1862), cols. 699–702.	Foley & Holder, Bede: A Biblical Miscellany (1999), pp. 29–34.
Letter to Helmwald	Jones, CCSL CXXIII C (1980), pp. 627–630, or earlier.	Jones, CCSL CXXIII C (1980), pp. 627–630.	Wallis, Reckoning of Time (1999), p. 416.
Letter to Wicthede	Hervagius, Opera Bedae Venerabilis (1563), or earlier.	Jones, CCSL CXXIII C (1980), pp. 631–642.	Wallis, Reckoning of Time (1999), pp. 417–424.
Letter to Albinus	Mabillon, Vetera Analecta (1675)	Plummer, Baedae Opera Historica I (1896), p. 3; and Westgard, "New Manuscripts of Bede's Letter to Albinus," Revue Bènèdictine 120 (2010), pp. 213–14.	Westgard, "New Manuscripts of Bede's Letter to Albinus," Revue Bènèdictine 120 (2010), p. 215.
Letter to Egbert	Ware, Epistolae Duae (1664)	Plummer, Baedae Opera Historica I (1896), pp. 405–423.	Whitelock, English Historical Documents (1979), pp. 735–745.
Life of St. Felix	Hervagius, Opera Bedae Venerabilis (1563), or earlier.	Migne, Venerabilis Bedae, Tomus Quintus (1862), cols. 789–798.	
Life of St. Anastasius		Carnandet, Acta Sanctorum (1863)	
Life of St. Cuthbert (verse)	Canisius, Antiquae Lectiones (1601–1604)	Jaager, Bedas metrische Vita sancti Cuthberti (1935), pp. 56–133.	
Life of St. Cuthbert (prose)	Hervagius, Opera Bedae Venerabilis, Tertius Tomus (1563), cols. 209–254.	Colgrave, Two Lives of St Cuthbert (1940), pp. 142–306.	Colgrave, Two Lives of St Cuthbert (1940), pp. 143–307.
History of the Abbots of Wearmouth and Jarrow		Plummer, Baedae Opera Historica I (1896), pp. 364–387; Christopher Grocock and I. N. Wood, eds. and trans., Abbots of Wearmouth and Jarrow (2013).	Farmer, Lives of the Abbots of Wearmouth and Jarrow (1983), pp. 185–210; Christopher Grocock and I. N. Wood, eds. and trans., Abbots of Wearmouth and Jarrow (2013).
Ecclesiastical History of the English People	Eggestein (printer); anonymous edition (c. 1475–1480)	Colgrave & Mynors, Bede's Ecclesiastical History (1969), pp. 2–576.	Colgrave & Mynors, Bede's Ecclesiastical History (1969), pp. 3–577.
Martyrology		Dubois & Reynaud, Edition pratique des martyrologues (1976), pp. 1–228.	Lifshitz, in Head, Medieval Hagiography (2001), pp. 179–196.
Hymns	Cassander (1536)	Fraipont, CCSL CXXII (1955), pp. 407–415, 419–438.	
Liber epigrammatum		Lapidge, Anglo-Latin Literature, 600–899 (1996), pp. 357–380 (fragments only).	
De die iudicii	Cassander (1536)	Fraipont, CCSL CXXII (1955), pp 439–444.	Allen & Calder, Sources and Analogues of Old English Poetry: The Major Latin Texts in Translation (1976), pp. 208–212.
De natura rerum	Sichardus (1529), or earlier.	Jones, CCSL CCXXX A (1975), pp. 189–234.	Kendall & Wallis, On the Nature of Things and On Times (2010), pp. 69–103.
De temporibus	Sichardus (1529), or earlier.	Jones, CCSL CCXXX C (1980), pp. 585–611.	Kendall & Wallis, On the Nature of Things and On Times (2010), pp. 104–131.
De temporum ratione	Petrus Marenus Aleander of Padua (1505), Chronica maiora only; Sichardus (1529), entire work.	Jones, CCSL CCXXX B (1977), pp. 263–460.	Wallis, Bede: The Reckoning of Time (Second Revised Edition) (2025).
De orthographia		Jones, CCSL CXXIII A (1975), pp. 7–57.	
De arte metrica		Kendall, Bede's Art of Poetry and Rhetoric (1991), pp. 36–167.	Kendall, Bede's Art of Poetry and Rhetoric (1991), pp. 36–167.
De schematibus et tropis		Kendall, Bede's Art of Poetry and Rhetoric (1991), pp. 168–209.	Kendall, Bede's Art of Poetry and Rhetoric (1991), pp. 168–209.
De Locis Sanctis		Fraipont, CCSL CLXXV (1965), pp. 251–280.	Foley & Holder, A Biblical Miscellany (1999), pp. 5–25.

== Complete works ==
Opera Bedae Venerabilis Presbyteri Anglosaxonis (Hervagius, Basel 1563).

- Opera Bedae Venerabilis Presbyteri, Anglosaxonis: Viri in Diuinis atque Humanis Literis Exercitatissimi: omnia in octo tomos distincta (Basileae: Joannes Hervagius 1563).
- Venerabilis Bedae Anglo-Saxonis Presbyteri in Omni Disciplinarum Genere Sua Aetate Doctissimi Operum Tomi VIII (Colonia Agrippina: Antonius Hieratus & Ioannes Gymnicus 1612).
- Venerabilis Bedae Presbyteri Anglo-Saxonis, Doctoris Ecclesiae Vere Illuminati, Opera... in Tomos VIII (Coloniae Agrippinae: apud Ioannem Wilhelmum Friessem juniorem 1688).

The first attempt to print a complete set of Bede's works was made in 1563 by Johannes Hervagius (Johann Herwagen the younger, died 1564), a printer of Basel, completing a project begun by his father (died 1557). This, which is taken as the Editio princeps, followed upon the first extended edition of Bede's Commentaries, edited by Franciscus Jametius, printed at Paris in three volumes in 1544, other works being available in separate editions.

The royal privilege of the first edition was granted by King Henry II of France to Bernard Brand, partner of Hervagius, in 1558, and re-granted to Hervagius the younger by Charles IX in 1561. (The latter was during the regency of Catherine de' Medici in the months preceding the Colloquy of Poissy.) In his Preface Ad Lectorem Hervagius credits Jacobus Pamelius with the assembly of texts and a significant role in their editing. The entire edition was dedicated to Marquard, Freiherr von Hattstein, Prince-Bishop of Speyer (1560-1581) and provost of the collegiate church of Weissenburg, Alsace. The Epistola Nuncupatoria remarks that Hervagius had met the cost of the edition more for religious reasons than from expectations of financial return: the pure and uncorrupt doctrines of Bede offered the most useful and weighty answers to the explanation of controversies flourishing in their own times.

Hervagius's edition, in eight folio volumes, was incomplete in some respects and included works that were later determined to be spuriously assigned to Bede. For example, the folio edition (following Jametius) includes a commentary on St Paul that is not by Bede (attributed by Mabillon to Florus of Lyon), and omits the commentary that Bede wrote. A full contents listing appears in the prefatory material to Volume 1. A newly re-set edition was printed at Cologne in 1612, also in eight volumes, following the same order of texts. A further revised edition was printed at Cologne in 1688. Casimir Oudin's commentary on the authenticity of the textual attributions to Bede in these editions was published in 1722, and was reproduced by Migne.

Corpus Christianorum, Series Latina. The following volumes of this series contain works by Bede:

- Vol. 118A (1967): Opera Exegetica. Ed. C.W. Jones. Contains Libri quatuor in principium Genesis usque ad nativitatem Isaac et eiectionem Ismahelis adnotationum.
- Vol. 119A (1969): Opera Exegetica. Ed.D. Hurst. Contains De tabernaculo, De templo and In Ezram et Neemiam.
- Vol. 119B (1983): Opera Exegetica. Ed.D. Hurst, J.E. Hudson. Contains In Tobiam, In Proverbia, In Cantica canticorum, and In Habacuc.
- Vol. 120 (1960): Opera Exegetica. Ed.D. Hurst. In Lucae evangelium expositio, and In Marci evangelium expositio. .
- Vol. 121 (1983): Opera Exegetica. Ed. M.L.W. Laistner, D. Hurst. Contains Expositio Actuum apostolorum, Retractatio in Actus apostolorum, Nomina regionum atque locorum de Actibus apostolorum, and In epistulas VII catholicas.
- Vol. 121A (2001): Opera Exegetica. Ed. R. Gryson. Contains Expositio Apocalypseos.
- Vol. 123A (1975): Opera Didascalica. Eds. C.W. Jones, C.B. Kendall, M.H. King, C.W. Jones. Contains De orthographia, De arte metrica et de schematibus et tropis, and De natura rerum.
- Vol. 123B (1977): Opera Didascalica. Ed. C.W. Jones. Contains De temporum ratione.
- Vol. 123C (1980): Opera Didascalica. Ed. C.W. Jones, C.W. Jones. Contains Magnus circulus seu tabula paschalis, Kalendarium sive Martyrologium, De temporibus liber, and Epistolae (ad Pleguinam, ad Helmwaldum, ad Wicthedum).
- Vol. 175 (1965): Itineraria et alia geographica. Eds. P. Geyer, O. Cuntz, A.. Francheschini, R. Weber, L. Bieler, J. Fraipont, F.. Glorie. Contains De locis sanctis, éd. J. Fraipont

Patrologia Latina. Volumes 90–94 of this series contain works by Bede, as follows.

- J.-P. Migne (ed.), Venerabilis Bedae Anglosaxonis Presbyteri Opera Omnia ex tribus praecipuis editionibus inter se collatis, 5 volumes (Patrologia Latina Vols 90–94), (Migne, Paris 1850).
- Vol. 90 (Bede 1): Opera didascalica, containing
  - De ortographia liber
  - De arte metrica
  - De schematis et tropis sacrae scripturae
  - De natura rerum
  - De temporibus
  - De ratione temporum
  - De ratione computi
  - De celebratione Paschae
  - De ordinatione feriarum Paschalium
  - De Tonitruis
- Vol. 91 (Bede 2): Opera exegetica (Inceptio)
  - Hexaemeron, sive libri quatuor in principium Genesis usque ad nativitatem Isaac et electionem Ismaelis
  - Commentarii in Pentateuchum
  - De Tabernaculo et Vasis ejus, ac Vestibus Sacerdotum libri tres
  - Expositionis allegoricae in Samuelem prophetam libri quatuor
  - In Libros Regum quaestiones XXX
  - Liber de Templo Salomonis
  - In Esdram et Nehemiam allegoricae Expositionis libri tres
  - Interpretatio in librum Tobiae
  - Expositio in Parabolas Salomonis
  - Libellus de Muliere forti
  - In Proverbia Salomonis interpretationis fragmenta
  - Expositionis in Cantica canticorum libri septem
  - Expositio in Canticum Habacuc
- Vol. 92 (Bede 3): Opera exegetica genuina (Continuatio)
  - Expositio in Evangelium S. Matthaei
  - Expositio in Evangelium S. Marci
  - Expositio in Evangelium S. Lucae
  - Expositio in Evangelium S. Joannis
  - Expositio in Actus Apostolorum
  - De nominibus Locorum vel Civitatum quae leguntur in libro Actuum
- Vol. 93 (Bede 4):
  - Pars Secunda
    - Sectio 1 – Opera exegetica genuina (Conclusio)
      - Expositio super Epistolas catholicas
      - Explanatio Apocalypsis
    - Sectio 2 – Dubia et Spuria
- Vol. 94 (Bede 5):
  - Pars Tertia: Opera Paraenetica
    - Sectio I: Homiliae
      - Homiliae genuinae
      - Homiliae subdititiae
    - Sectio II: Ascetica
      - Libellus precum
      - De Officiis Libellus ex quorumdam Patrum dictis excerptus
      - Excerptiones Patrum, Collectanea, Flores ex diversis, Quaestiones et Parabolae
      - De Meditatione Passionis Christi per septem diei horas
      - De Remediis peccatorum
    - Sectio III: Carmina
      - Vita metrica S. Cuthberti Lindisfarnensis episcopi
      - Passio S. Justini Martyris
      - Martyrologium poeticum
      - Hymni tredecim
  - Pars Quarta: Opera Historica
    - Sectio 1: Hagiographica
      - Vita SS. Abbatum monasterii in Wiramutha et Gircum Benedicti, Ceolfridi, Easteruini, Sigfridi et Hwaetbercti
      - Vita prosaica S. Cuthberti Lindisfarnensis episcopi
      - Vita B. Felicis confessoris
    - Sectio 2: Martyrologia
      - Martyrologia juxta exemplaria Coloniense et Bollandianum
      - Appendices quatuor ad Martyrologia
    - I. Kalendarium Anglicanum, sive libellus annalis Ven. Bedae
    - II. Necrologium insertum Ven. Bedae Martyrologio
    - III. Chronicon breve a mundi exordio usque ad annum Christi DCCCX, ex vetusto codice ms. Bedae de Ratione temporum, qui fuit ecclesiae seu monasterii Sancti Dionysium Francia.
  - De Locis Sanctis Libellus, quem de opusculus majorum abbreviando Beda composuit
