= Abbey of the Holy Ghost =

Medieval prose allegory

The Abbey of the Holy Ghost is a medieval prose allegory, ca. 1350–1375. The text is preserved in at least 26 manuscripts, often followed by the Charter of the Abbey of the Holy Ghost. The text advises lay women on how to live a contemplative life outside a monastery; the companion Charter speaks of the fall and salvation.

The most recent edition The Charter of the Abbey of the Holy Ghost, was released in 1975 by University Microfilms International.
